= Jimmy D. Long =

American politician (1931–2016)

- Long in 1975

Member of the Louisiana House of Representatives
- In office 1968–2000
- Preceded by: Ray Tarver
- Succeeded by: Taylor Townsend

Personal details
- Born: Jimmy Dale Long; October 6, 1931 Winn Parish, Louisiana, U.S.
- Died: August 9, 2016 (aged 84) Natchitoches, Louisiana, U.S.
- Party: Democratic
- Spouse: Dorothy Griffin Long
- Children: 1
- Relatives: Long family
- Education: Northwestern State University

Jimmy Dale Long (October 6, 1931 – August 9, 2016) was an American politician. A member of the Democratic Party, he served in the Louisiana House of Representatives from 1968 to 2000.

== Life and career ==
Long was born in Winn Parish, Louisiana, the son of Rubin and Ruby Long. He was the brother of Gerald Long, a Louisiana state senator, and was the first, second and third cousin of George S. Long, a United States representative, Huey Long, a United States senator, Earl Long, a Louisiana governor, Russell B. Long, a United States senator, Gillis William Long, a United States representative, Speedy Long, a United States representative, and Mike Smith, a Louisiana state senator. He attended and graduated from Winnfield High School. After graduating, he served in the United States Navy, which after his discharge, he attended Northwestern State University.

Long served in the Louisiana House of Representatives from 1968 to 2000. During his service in the House, in 2000, he was inducted into the Louisiana Political Museum and Hall of Fame.

== Death ==
Long died on August 9, 2016, of traffic collision in the afternoon at 1:00 pm, next to his home in Natchitoches, Louisiana, at the age of 84.
