= Gerald Long =

American politician (born 1944)

President pro tempore of the Louisiana Senate
- In office January 11, 2016 – January 13, 2020
- Preceded by: Sharon Weston Broome
- Succeeded by: Beth Mizell

Member of the Louisiana State Senate from the 31st district
- In office January 14, 2008 – January 13, 2020
- Preceded by: Mike Smith
- Succeeded by: Louie Bernard

Personal details
- Born: July 9, 1944 (age 82) Winnfield, Louisiana, U.S.
- Party: Republican
- Spouse: Rose Long
- Children: 3
- Relatives: Long family
- Education: Northwestern State University

Gerald Long (born July 9, 1944) is an American politician. He served as a Republican member for the 31st district of the Louisiana State Senate.

Long was born in Winnfield, Louisiana. He was the brother of Jimmy D. Long, and his paternal grandfather was Gillis William Long. Other relatives were the politicians George S. Long, Huey Long, Earl Long, Russell B. Long and Speedy Long. Long attended Northwestern State University, where he earned his degree in 1966.

In 2008, Long was elected for the 31st district of the Louisiana State Senate. He succeeded Mike Smith. Long was succeeded by Louie Bernard in 2020.
