= Long family =

American political family

Long
- Political family
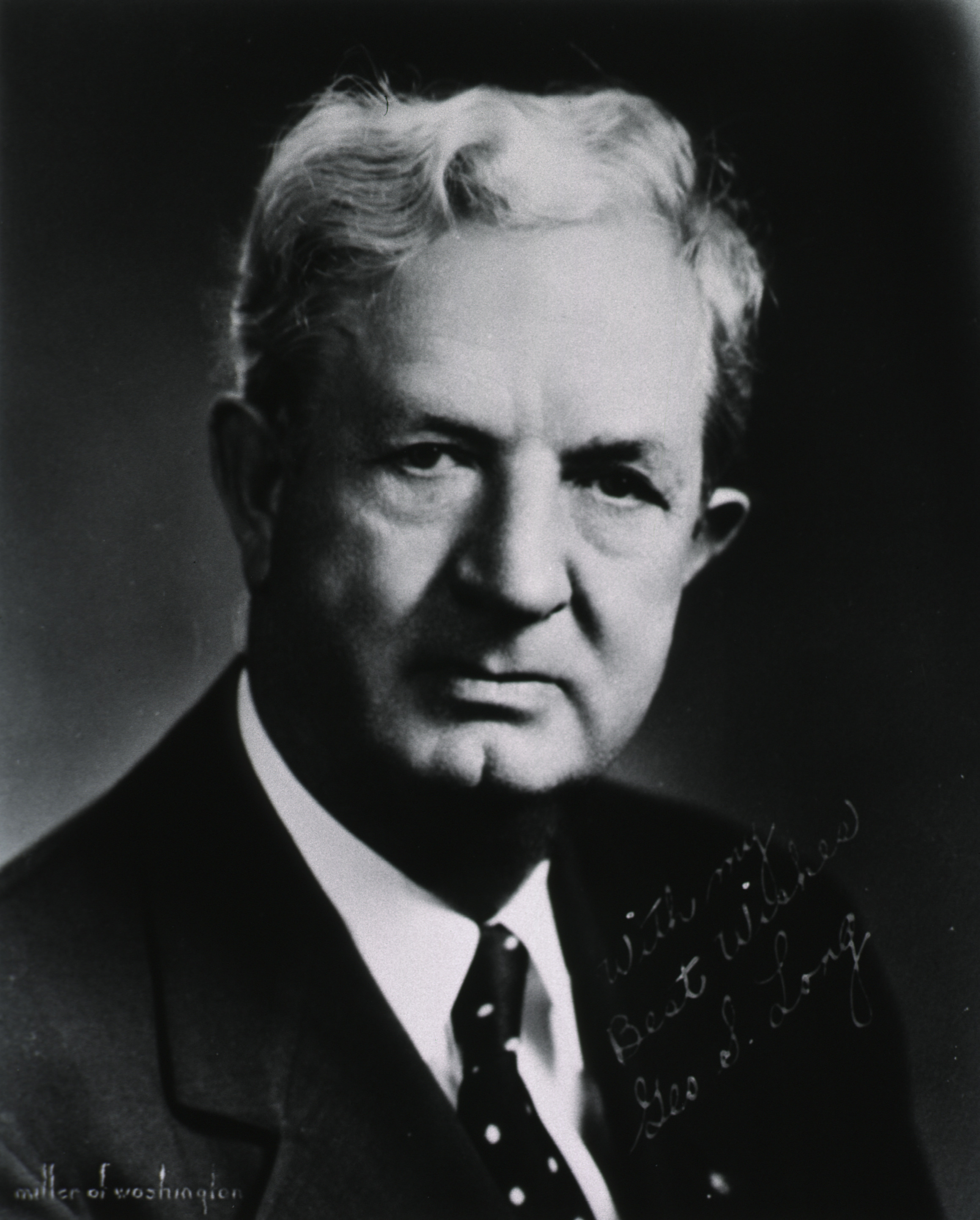
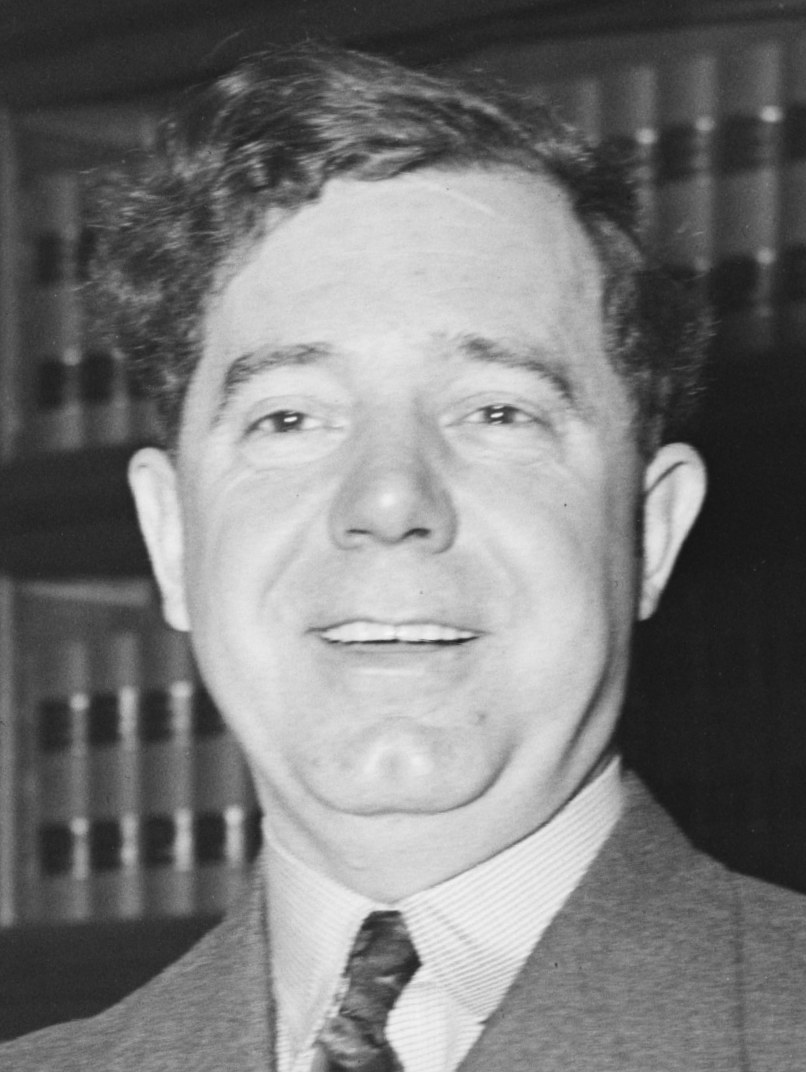
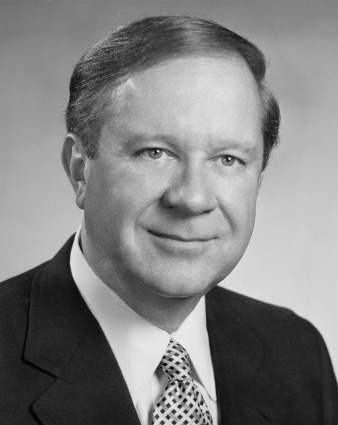
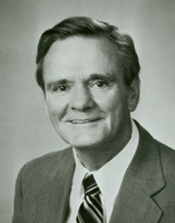
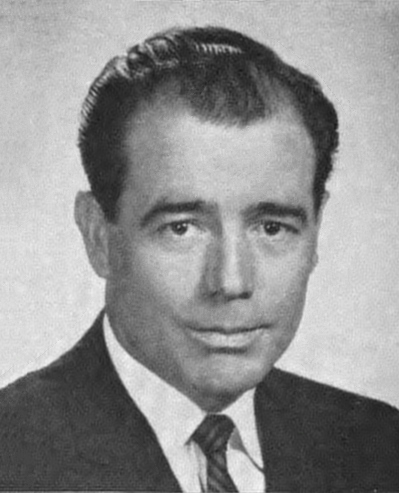
- George S. Long Huey Long Russell Long Gillis William Long Speedy Long Jimmy D. Long
- Country: United States
- Current region: Louisiana
- Founder: George S. Long
- Titles: List: Senator (from Louisiana); Governor of Louisiana (40 & 45); First Lady of Louisiana; Second Lady of Louisiana; Member of the House of Representatives (from Louisiana); Louisiana State Senator; Oklahoma State Representative; Member of the Louisiana Public Service Commission
- Members: see below

The Long family is a family of politicians from the United States. Many have characterized it as a political dynasty. After Huey Long's 1935 assassination, a family dynasty emerged: his brother Earl was elected lieutenant-governor in 1936, and governor in 1948 and 1956. Long's widow, Rose McConnell Long, was appointed to replace him in the Senate, and his son Russell B. Long, was a U.S. senator from 1948 to 1987. As chairman of the Senate Finance Committee, Russell shaped the nation's tax laws. He was an advocate of low business taxes, but also passed the Earned Income Credit and other tax legislation beneficial to the poor. In addition to Long's brother Earl becoming governor, brother Julius Long was a Winn Parish District Attorney, and brother George S. Long was elected to Congress in 1952. Other more distant relatives, including Gillis William Long and Speedy O. Long, represented Louisiana in the U.S. Congress. Jimmy D. Long of Natchitoches Parish served for 32 years in the Louisiana House. Jimmy's younger brother Gerald Long holds the distinction of being the first office-holder to be a registered Republican among the Long Democratic dynasty. Books about the political family were written by Jack B. McGuire.

Below is a list of family members who have held public office:

- George S. Long (1883–1958), Oklahoma State Representative 1920–1922, delegate to the Democratic National Convention 1948, U.S. Representative from Louisiana 1953–1958. Brother of Huey Long and Earl Long.
- Huey Long (1893–1935), Governor of Louisiana 1928–1932, Democratic National Committeeman 1928, U.S. Senator from Louisiana 1932–1935. Brother of George S. Long and Earl Long.
- Earl Long (1895–1960), Lieutenant Governor of Louisiana 1936–1939, Governor of Louisiana 1939–1940, 1948–1952, and 1956–1960, candidate for U.S. Representative from Louisiana 1960. Brother of George S. Long and Huey Long.
- Rose McConnell Long (1892–1970), delegate to the Democratic National Convention 1936, U.S. Senator from Louisiana 1936–1937. Wife of Huey Long.
- Blanche Long (1902–1998), delegate to the Democratic National Convention 1956 1960, Democratic National Committeewoman 1956–1963. Wife of Earl Long.
- Russell B. Long (1918–2003), U.S. Senator from Louisiana 1948–1987. Son of Huey Long and Rose McConnell Long, husband of Carolyn Bason Long (1922–2015), son-in-law of Samuel Bason, banker-businessman and member of the North Carolina State Senate.
- John S. Hunt, II (1928–2001), member of the Louisiana Public Service Commission 1964–1972, nephew of Earl and Huey Long; son of Lucille Long Hunt, cousin of Russell B. Long.
- Gillis William Long (1923–1985), U.S. Representative from Louisiana 1963–1965 and 1973–1985, candidate for Governor of Louisiana 1963, delegate to the Democratic National Convention 1964. Cousin of George S. Long, Huey Long, and Earl Long.
- Speedy O. Long (1928–2006), Louisiana State Senator 1956–1964, U.S. Representative from Louisiana 1965–1973. Cousin of George S. Long, Huey Long, and Earl Long.
- Catherine Small Long (1924–2019), U.S. Representative from Louisiana 1985–1987. Widow of Gillis Long.
- Willard L. Rambo (1917–1984), Member of the Louisiana House of Representatives from Grant Parish 1952–1960, Louisiana State Senator 1964–1968, husband of Mary Alice Long Rambo, granddaughter of William Jefferson Long.
- Floyd W. Smith, Jr. (1932–2010), Mayor of Pineville, Louisiana 1966–1970, second cousin of Speedy O. Long.
- Jimmy D. Long (1931–2016), Louisiana State Representative 1968–2000. Brother of Gerald Long and Bill Long, third cousin of Huey Long and Earl Long.
- Gerald Long (born 1944), Louisiana State Senator 2008–2020. Brother of Jimmy Long and Bill Long, third cousin of Huey Long and Earl Long.
- William Jackson "Bill" Long, candidate for lieutenant governor 1983. Brother of Jimmy Long and Gerald Long, third cousin of Huey Long and Earl Long.
- Mike Smith (born 1948), Louisiana State Senator 1996–2008 (succeeded by Gerald Long), first cousin of Jimmy, Gerald and Bill Long. Smith's father, P. K. Smith, was the brother of Ruby Smith Long, the mother of Jimmy, Gerald and Bill Long.

== See also ==
- List of United States political families
