= Donald S. Long =

Sports blogger (b. 1935, d. 2012)

- Born: December 17, 1935; Tannehill, Louisiana
- Died: April 28, 2012 (aged 76); Lafayette, Louisiana
- Occupation: Blogger
- Years active: 1996-2012
- Spouse: Joy Ardoin Long
- Children: 5
- Website: DandyDon.com

Donald S. Long (December 17, 1935 - April 28, 2012) was a widely known Louisiana State University sports blogger and the author of DandyDon.com. He was a lifelong LSU sports fan. Dandy Don died from colon cancer on April 28, 2012.

== Background ==
Donald Long was born in Tannehill, Louisiana to Ruben Ray Long (1900–1966) and the former Ruby Smith (1906–1984). He was raised in the Winnfield area and was a resident of Lafayette for 51 years. Long was married to his wife, Joy Ardoin Long, for 53 years. They raised five children together. Don had a career in the meat and seafood industries. He worked as a meat cutter and market manager. Later, he was a meat and seafood inspector for the state of Louisiana.

The Long family is part of a Louisiana political dynasty lasting over 100 years. His brother, Jimmy D. Long, was elected to Louisiana House of Representatives (District 23) from 1968 until 2000. Another brother, Gerald Long, was elected to the Louisiana State Senate in 2007. Their third cousins, Earl Long and Huey Long, were both former governors of Louisiana.

== Dandy Don Blog ==
Long loved sports and served as a football official for the Louisiana High School Association for 18 years. He faithfully attended every LSU football game for over 30 years. To honor his passion for LSU sports his son, Scott, built a website for Don for his 61st birthday. Scott chose the name Dandy Don for the site because his father had used that moniker in the 1970s when he made high school football predictions for his brother’s newspaper, The Red River Journal. Don’s years spent officiating football games gave him insight and contacts to the high school football talent. He would type a report of his LSU knowledge and predictions and give it to his son, who posted it to the blog. Don gave LSU fans a daily installment of Tiger news, game predictions, and Louisiana high school football prospects. The website now includes other features such as recipes, a media gallery, a Ticket Exchange page where users can post LSU tickets for sale, and links to LSU sports schedules. The DandyDon.com website attracted almost 70,000 regular readers within ten years of its inception and grew to over 150,000 readers by Don’s death in 2012. The website is currently run by Don’s son, Scott Long, and remains free for all readers.
