= Speedy Long =

American politician (1928–2006)

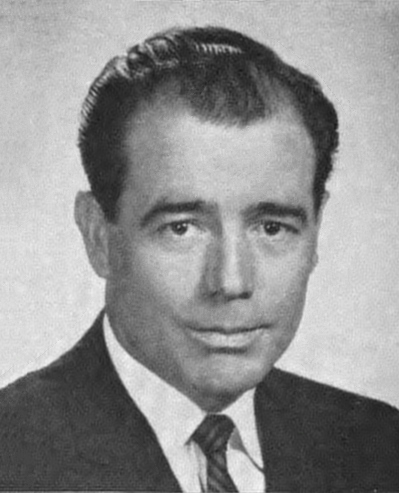

Member of the U.S. House of Representatives from Louisiana's 8th district
- In office January 3, 1965 – January 3, 1973
- Preceded by: Gillis William Long
- Succeeded by: Gillis William Long

Member of the Louisiana State Senate
- In office 1956–1964
- Preceded by: Gove D. Davis
- Succeeded by: Willard L. Rambo

Personal details
- Born: Speedy Oteria Long; June 16, 1928 Tullos, Louisiana, U.S.
- Died: October 5, 2006 (aged 78) Jena, Louisiana, U.S.
- Party: Democratic
- Relatives: Long family
- Education: Louisiana State University (JD)

Military service
- Branch/service: United States Navy
- Years of service: 1946–1948; 1951–1952

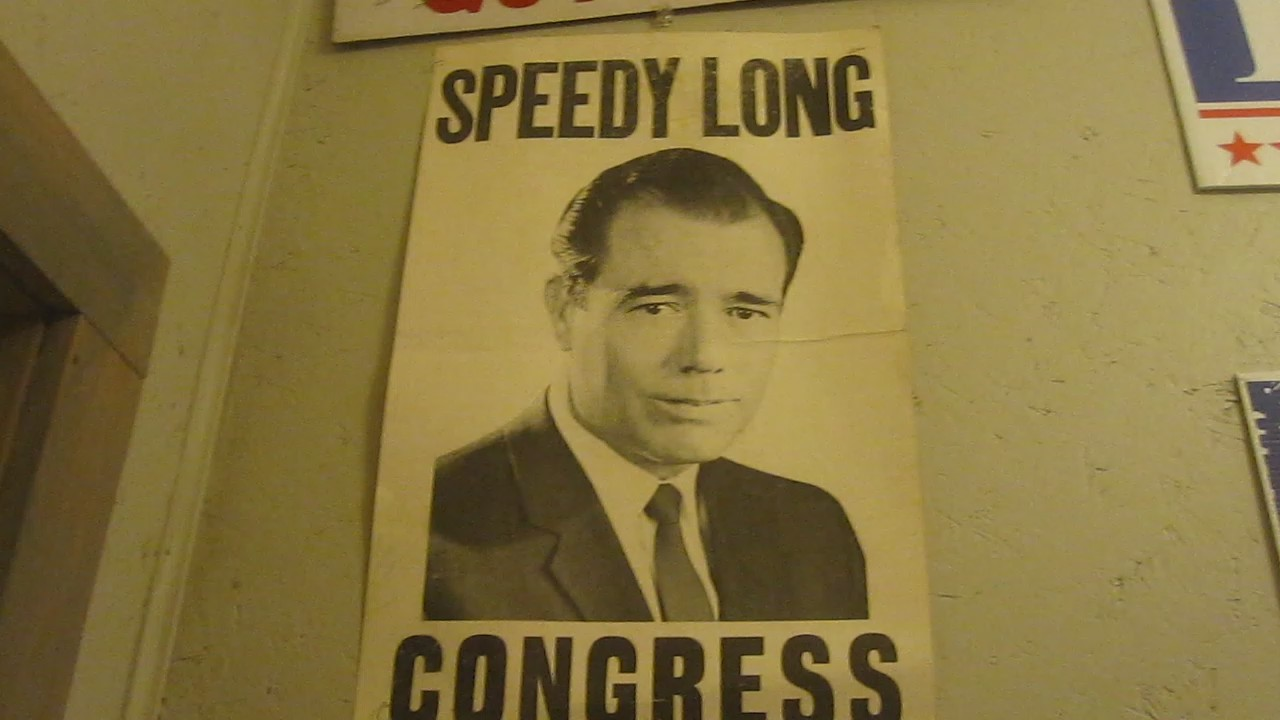
Campaign photo for congressman Speedy Long, prior to 1970

Speedy Oteria Long (June 16, 1928 – October 5, 2006) was an American politician who served in the United States House of Representatives for Louisiana's 8th congressional district from January 3, 1965, until January 3, 1973. He was a member of the Long family, a cousin of Huey Long, Earl K. Long, Russell B. Long, Gillis William Long, Jimmy D. Long and Gerald Long.

== Life and career ==
Speedy Oteria Long was born in Tullos, Louisiana, in La Salle Parish on June 16, 1928. He was given the name Speedy because he was born prematurely. He attended public schools in LaSalle and Winn Parish, graduating in 1945 from Winnfield High School. He served in the United States Navy from April 1946 to February 1948.

Long attended college at Northeast Junior College in Monroe, Louisiana, graduating in 1950, and then at Northwestern State College in Natchitoches, Louisiana, from which he graduated in 1951. He was recalled to active duty in the Navy from September 1951 to December 1952, then graduated from Louisiana State University Law School in Baton Rouge in February 1959. Long was admitted to the Louisiana bar in 1959 and began the practice of law in Jena, Louisiana.

Long was elected to the Louisiana State Senate and served from May 1956 to May 1964, after which he ran in the primary to be the Democratic nominee for election to United States House of Representatives representing Louisiana's 8th congressional district. His opponent in the primary was the incumbent, his cousin Gillis Long.

Both of the Longs were segregationists but Gillis Long was less outspoken in his views than Speedy Long was, and Gillis had also, according to Speedy, aided the passage of the Civil Rights Act of 1964 by voting to increase the size of the House Rules Committee from 12 to 15 members, thus diluting the South's influence on the committee. Speedy used the slogan "Vote Against the Man Who Voted Against the South" in the campaign against Gillis. A state senator from New Orleans described the difference between the two Longs: Speedy was "a redneck" with a regional focus, while Gillis was "a cosmopolitan". In the primary, Speedy Long easily beat Gillis Long. Speedy's campaign in the general election was limited to a single 150-second television appearance. Although the Republican presidential candidate, Barry Goldwater, carried the district, Democrat Speedy Long won election handily, becoming the sixth member of the Long family to serve in the United States Congress.

Long served in Congress from 1965 to 1973. In 1972, he ran for Governor of Louisiana, but placed eighth in the Democratic primary, winning just 5 percent of the vote and losing to Edwin Edwards. Long declined to seek re-election later that year, and his cousin Gillis again ran, winning the district and being re-elected six times.

Instead, in 1972, Speedy Long successfully ran to be District Attorney of the 28th Judicial District, which included Caldwell and LaSalle parishes. He re-elected unopposed in 1978. He declined to seek another term in 1984, and instead ran for Governor in 1987. Long finished in a distant sixth place, winning just 1.2 percent of the vote.

After his loss in the 1987 gubernatorial election, Long returned to the practice of law. In 1994, he was appointed as a District Judge in the 28th Judicial District, serving until a successor was elected later that year. In 1995, Long ran for LaSalle Parish Sheriff, but placed fourth in the primary and did not advance to the runoff election.

Long was inducted into the Louisiana Political Hall of Fame in 1996. He died on October 5, 2006, in Jena, Louisiana.

U.S. House of Representatives
Preceded by Gillis William Long	Member of the U.S. House of Representatives from Louisiana's 8th congressional district 1965–1973	Succeeded by Gillis William Long
