= LA-5 =

LA-5, La-5, LA 5 or LA5 may refer to:

- Lavochkin La-5, a Soviet fighter aircraft of World War II
- Louisiana Highway 5, a northwest–southeast route in DeSoto Parish, Louisiana
- Louisiana's 5th congressional district, a federal congressional district covering much of northeastern and central Louisiana
- Louisiana's 5th State Senate district, a state senate district primarily in New Orleans, Louisiana
- Louisiana's 5th House of Representatives district, a district in the Louisiana House of Representatives representing parts of Caddo Parish
- Los Angeles City Council District 5, representing Los Angeles communities in the Westside, central-eastern Santa Monica Mountains, and central-southern San Fernando Valley
- Constituency LA-5, a constituency of the Azad Jammu and Kashmir Legislative Assembly in Pakistan
- La5, an Italian television channel
- La Cinq, a former French television channel
