= Louisiana's 5th House of Representatives district =

American legislative district

Louisiana's 5th State House of Representatives district
Representative
Dennis Bamburg Jr. R–Bossier City

Louisiana's 5th House of Representatives district is one of 105 Louisiana House of Representatives districts. It is currently represented by Republican Dennis Bamburg Jr. of Bossier City.

== Geography ==
HD5 includes the cities of Coushatta, Edgefield, and Hall Summit, and part of the city of Bossier City.

== Election results ==
Year	Winning candidate	Party	Percent	Opponent	Party	Percent
2011	Alan Seabaugh	Republican	79.3%	Cynthia Norton Robinson	Republican	20.7%
2015	Alan Seabaugh	Republican	71.1%	Eileen Velez	Democratic	28.9%
2019	Alan Seabaugh	Republican	66.2%	Brian Salvatore	Democratic	33.8%
2023	Dennis Bamburg Jr.	Republican	Cancelled			
