= 1936 Louisiana lieutenant gubernatorial election =

- April 21, 1936
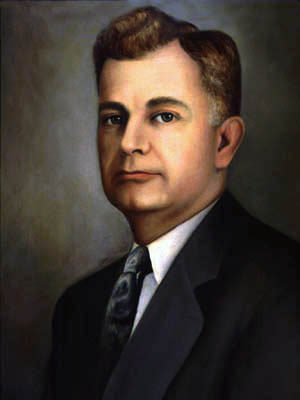
Nominee	Earl Long
Party	Democratic
Popular vote	131,991
Percentage	100.00%
- Parish results Long: 90–100%
Lieutenant Governor before election
James A. Noe (Acting)
Democratic
Elected Lieutenant Governor
Earl Long
Democratic

The 1936 Louisiana lieutenant gubernatorial election was held on April 21, 1936, in order to elect the lieutenant governor of Louisiana. Democratic nominee Earl Long won the election as he ran unopposed.

== Democratic primary ==
The Democratic primary election was held on January 21, 1936. Candidate Earl Long received a majority of the votes (67.13%), and was thus elected as the nominee for the general election.

=== Results ===
1936 Democratic lieutenant gubernatorial primary
Party	Candidate	Votes	%
Democratic	Earl Long	360,815	67.13%
Democratic	Clement M. Moss	176,705	32.87%
Total votes		537,520	100.00%

== General election ==
On election day, April 21, 1936, Democratic nominee Earl Long won the election with 131,991 votes as he ran unopposed, thereby retaining Democratic control over the office of lieutenant governor. Long was sworn in as the 38th lieutenant governor of Louisiana on May 12, 1936.

=== Results ===
Louisiana lieutenant gubernatorial election, 1936
Party	Candidate	Votes	%
Democratic	Earl Long	131,991	100.00
Total votes		131,991	100.00
Democratic hold			
