= Donald Long =

Donald Long may refer to:

- Donald Russell Long, United States Army soldier and Medal of Honor recipient
- Donald S. Long, Louisiana State University sports blogger
- Don Long, American baseball coach
