= Senator Bernard =

Senator Bernard may refer to:

- Louie Bernard (fl. 2020s), Louisiana State Senate
- Mack Bernard (born 1976), Florida State Senate
- Susan Bernard (politician) (fl. 2020s), Maine State Senate
- Wanda Thomas Bernard (born 1953), Senate of Canada

== See also ==
- Cory Bernardi (born 1969), Australian Senate
