= Mike Smith (Louisiana politician) =

American politician

Member of the Louisiana State Senate from the 31st district
- In office 1996–2008
- Preceded by: Donald G. Kelly
- Succeeded by: Gerald Long

Personal details
- Born: Kenneth Michael Smith; June 1, 1948 (age 78) Winnfield, Louisiana, U.S.
- Party: Democratic; Independent
- Parent: P. K. Smith (father)
- Relatives: Long family
- Education: Northwestern State University

Kenneth Michael Smith (born June 1, 1948) is an American politician. He served as a Democratic member for the 31st district of the Louisiana State Senate.

Smith was born in Winnfield, Louisiana, the son of P. K. Smith. Smith graduated from high school in Winnfield in 1966, then attended Northwestern State University, where he earned a degree in agribusiness in 1970. Smith is related to the Long family of Louisiana politicians.

In 1996 Smith was elected for the 31st district of the Louisiana State Senate. After serving the maximum term of 12 years, Smith was succeeded by his cousin Gerald Long in 2008.
