= 1985 United States House of Representatives elections =

- March 30, 1985 – August 3, 1985

2 (out of 435) seats in the U.S. House of Representatives 218 seats needed for a majority
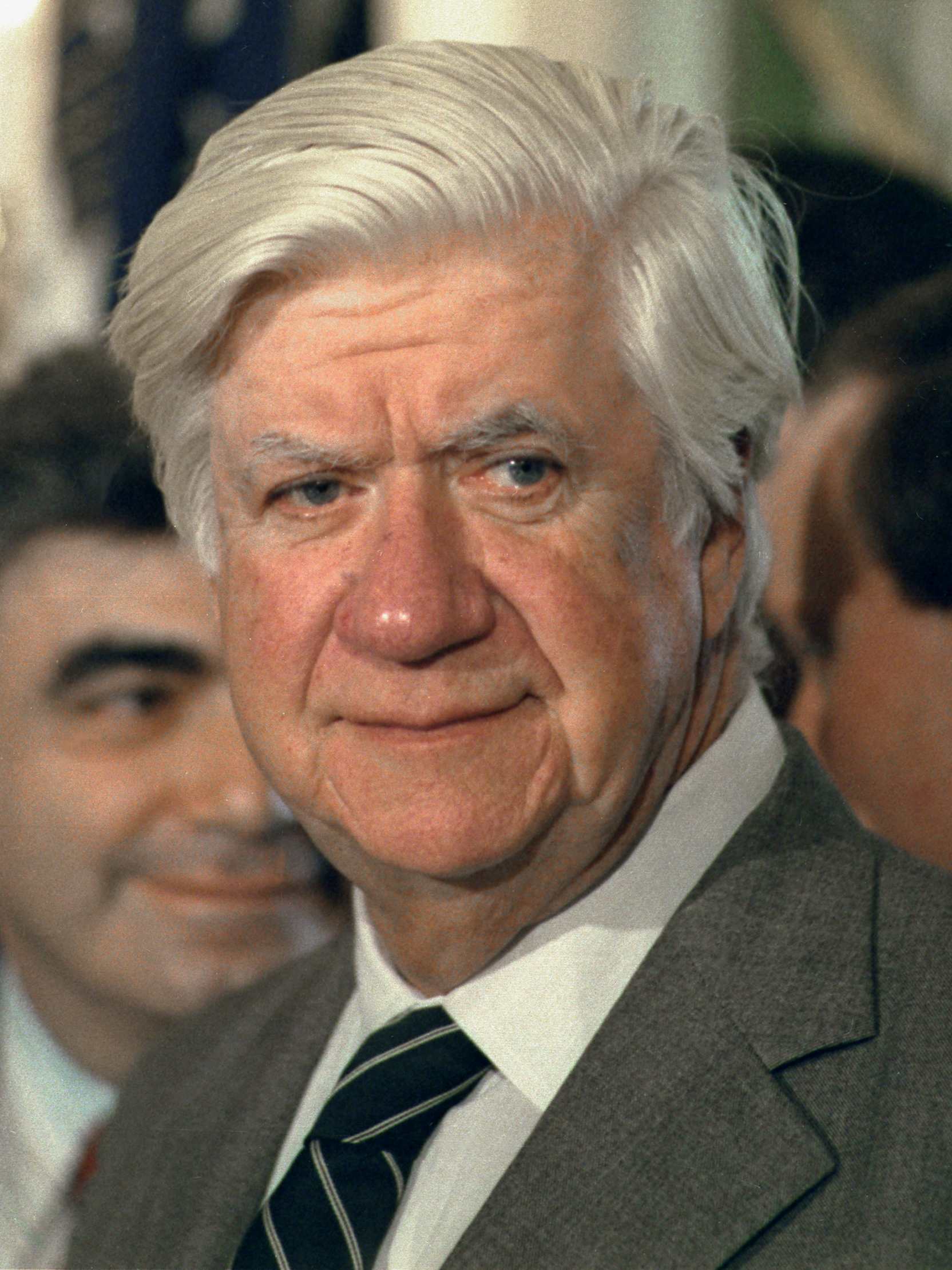

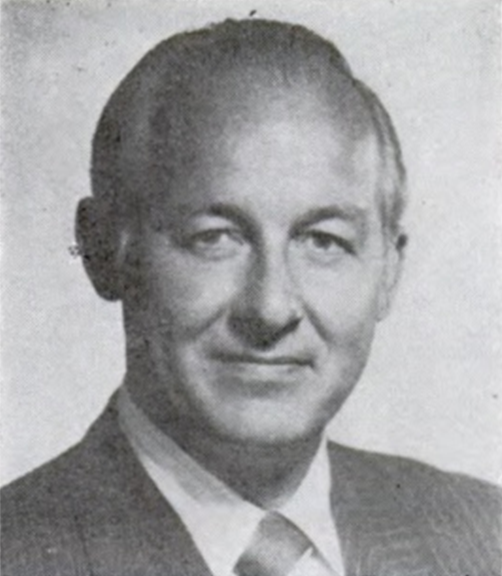
	Majority party	Minority party
Leader	Tip O'Neill	Bob Michel
Party	Democratic	Republican
Leader since	January 4, 1977	January 3, 1981
Leader's seat	Massachusetts 8th	Illinois 18th
Last election	253 seats	182 seats
Seat change	Steady	Steady
Seats up	2	0
Races won	2	0

There were two elections to the United States House of Representatives to serve in the 99th United States Congress.

== List of elections ==
Elections are listed by date and district.

District	Incumbent			This race	
District	Member	Party	First elected	Results	Candidates
Louisiana 8	Gillis William Long	Democratic	1962	Incumbent died January 20, 1985. New member elected to finish her husband's term March 30, 1985. Democratic hold.	▌ ✓ Catherine Small Long (Democratic) 55.79%; ▌Jock Scott (Democratic) 24.50%; ▌Clyde C. Holloway (Republican) 16.27%; ▌Daniel E. Becnel (Democratic) 2.98%; ▌Frank J. McTopy (Democratic) 0.45%
Texas 1	Sam B. Hall	Democratic	1976 (special)	Incumbent resigned May 27, 1985 to become a U.S. District Judge. New member elected August 3, 1985. Democratic hold.	▌ ✓ Jim Chapman (Democratic) 50.93%; ▌Edd Hargett (Republican) 49.07%
