= Willard L. Rambo =

American politician (1917–1984)

Member of the Louisiana House of Representatives
- In office 1952–1960

Member of the Louisiana State Senate
- In office 1964–1968
- Preceded by: Speedy Long
- Succeeded by: J. C. Gilbert

Personal details
- Born: Willard Lloyd Rambo; March 22, 1917 Georgetown, Louisiana, U.S.
- Died: November 28, 1984 (aged 67) Houston, Texas, U.S.
- Party: Democratic
- Spouse: Mary Alice Long
- Children: 4
- Relatives: Long family
- Education: USAF Air War College

Willard Lloyd Rambo (March 22, 1917 – November 28, 1984) was an American politician. A member of the Democratic Party, he served in the Louisiana House of Representatives from 1952 to 1960 and in the Louisiana State Senate from 1964 to 1968.

== Life and career ==
Rambo was born in Georgetown, Louisiana, the son of Sim and Rosie Rambo. He attended and graduated from USAF Air War College. After graduating, he served in the armed forces during World War II, and flew with the Flying Tigers in China.

Rambo served in the Louisiana House of Representatives from 1952 to 1960. After his service in the House, he then served in the Louisiana State Senate from 1964 to 1968.

== Death ==
Rambo died on November 28, 1984, of heart failure in Houston, Texas, at the age of 67.
