= Jack B. McGuire =

American historian and non-fiction writer

- Occupations: Historian, non-fiction writer

Jack B. McGuire is an American historian and non-fiction writer. He is best known for his non-fiction books on Louisiana governors and the Long family.

== Books ==
- Louisiana Governors: Rulers, Rascals, and Reformers (2008; co-wrote with Walter Greaves Cowan)
- Win the Race or Die Trying: Uncle Earl's Last Hurrah (2016)
- Killing the Kingfish: The Huey Long Assassination (2026)
