= Taylor Townsend (politician) =

American lawyer and politician

Member of the Louisiana House of Representatives
- In office February, 2000 – January 14, 2008
- Preceded by: Jimmy D. Long

Personal details
- Born: Thomas Taylor Townsend; 1963 (age 62–63)
- Party: Democratic

Taylor Townsend (born 1963) is an American lawyer and politician. A Democrat, he served in the Louisiana House of Representatives from 2000 to 2008.

Townsend is the nephew of former state senator Donald G. Kelly.

Townsend was hired as a lawyer for Governor John Bel Edwards in 2016.
