= Alan Seabaugh =

American attorney

Member of the Louisiana Senate from the 31st district
- Incumbent
- Assumed office January 8, 2024
- Preceded by: Louie Bernard

Member of the Louisiana House of Representatives from the 5th district
- In office October 2010 – January 8, 2024
- Preceded by: Wayne Waddell
- Succeeded by: Dennis Bamburg Jr.

Personal details
- Born: Alan Thomas Seabaugh; May 20, 1967 (age 59) Shreveport, Louisiana, U.S.
- Party: Republican
- Spouse: Laura McClelland
- Children: 4
- Education: Louisiana State University (BA, JD)

Alan Thomas Seabaugh (born May 20, 1967) is an American attorney from Shreveport, Louisiana, who is a Republican member of the Louisiana Senate from District 31. He previously served as a member of the Louisiana House of Representatives from District 5 in Caddo Parish, where he served as the founding Chairman of the Louisiana Freedom Caucus.

== Background ==
Alan Seabaugh has been a member of the Louisiana House of Representatives since 2010. He currently serves on the House Ways and Means, Insurance, and Labor Committees as well as the Joint Legislative Committee on the Capital Outlay. In 2012, he was elected Vice Chairman of the Louisiana House Republican delegation.

Seabaugh is the managing partner of Seabaugh, Joffrion, Sepulvado & Victory law firm. The practice includes insurance defense and claims, contracts, real estate law, property law, and all areas of civil and commercial litigation. He also is a member of the Louisiana Supreme Court Committee on Bar Admissions.

Seabaugh was a delegate and vice chairman of the Louisiana delegation to the 2008 Republican National Convention held in St. Paul, Minnesota. He was also a member of the Electoral College that year. He cast his two votes for the unsuccessful McCain/Palin ticket. He was a delegate to the 2010 Southern Republican Leadership Conference which convened in New Orleans.

He has been affiliated with the Christian nationalist legal organization Alliance Defending Freedom.

== Political campaigns ==
=== State senate campaign of 2007 ===
In 2007, Seabaugh unsuccessfully challenged Republican State Senator Sherri Smith Buffington.

Seabaugh said that Cheek (now Buffington) "runs as a Republican and votes like a Democrat", and that he was disturbed that people from Caddo Parish had left Louisiana to seek economic opportunity elsewhere. Cheek won with fifty-seven percent of the vote.

=== State legislature ===
Seabaugh was elected to the legislature in 2010 to fill a vacancy created by the resignation of Republican Wayne Waddell. In the 2010 election, Seabaugh defeated Republican and Red River Bank president Harold Turner 57-43 percent.

In the primary election held on October 22, 2011, Seabaugh defeated fellow Republican and former Shreveport City Councilwoman Cynthia Norton Robertson, receiving 79.3% of the vote.

In the October 24, 2015 primary election, Seabaugh won reelection to the House 71-29 percent, defeating Democrat Eileen Velez of Shreveport.

== U.S. Senate candidacy declined ==
In 2013, Seabaugh was strongly encouraged to enter the upcoming 2014 U.S. Senate Race against U.S. Senator Mary Landrieu, a Louisiana Democrat who unsuccessfully sought a fourth term in the office. Another Republican conservative, Rob Maness, a United States Air Force colonel from St. Tammany Parish, also sought the Senate seat. Seabaugh announced that he would not enter the race and strongly endorsed Bill Cassidy, who subsequently unseated Landrieu.

== Legislative record ==
Seabaugh's first legislative session dealt with redistricting state legislative and congressional districts. Seabaugh took a role in drafting the map of Louisiana's House of Representatives' districts by authoring an amendment which protected the integrity of the Southern Hills area of Shreveport.

Prior to the start of his first full term, Seabaugh was elected vice chairman of the Louisiana House Republican delegation. He was also appointed as vice chairman of the House Civil Law and Procedure Committee, in which he led the fight for tort reform and against lawsuit abuse. Early in the new term, Seabaugh co-authored and was one of the principal floor leaders responsible for the passage of several education reform measures. These bills were passed and signed into law as Acts 1 and 2 of 2012.

Seabaugh also was instrumental in blocking efforts to have Louisiana join the National Popular Vote compact.

Prior to the start of the 2013 session, Seabaugh was appointed to the House Appropriations Committee, which is primarily responsible for drafting the state's budget.

During the 2013 session, Seabaugh authored legislation which would have eliminated personal and corporate state income taxes. He also introduced legislation which would have eliminated all state taxes on retirement benefits. Seabaugh's tax cut legislation failed to pass the Republican controlled House Ways and Means Committee.

Seabaugh authored legislation designed to lessen the influence of public employee unions. His HB 552 sought to strike out language in current law allowing for automatic payroll deductions for "union dues, fees and assessments". The bill failed in committee by one vote when two members switched their votes, allegedly because of lobbying efforts by organized labor, according to a right-wing Louisiana-based politics blog known as the Hayride.

In 2015, Seabaugh was one of a small group of conservative Republicans who opposed tax increases which were passed with the support of Governor Jindal. For this, Seabaugh was named one of seven MVPs by the Louisiana Association of Business and Industry. In 2015, Seabaugh was also named State Representative of the year by the Childcare Association of Louisiana.

On June 9, 2021, Seabaugh accused Malinda Brumfield White of threatening to shoot him with a gun during a dispute over a domestic-abuse bill under consideration. White "later apologized on the House floor for the altercation". White withdrew the bill the next day.

=== Christmas bill ===
In December 2013, Representative Seabaugh announced that he would present a bill in the 2014 legislative session limiting litigation against public schools who celebrated Christmas. Threats of lawsuits by the ACLU and other groups had resulted in many schools canceling Christmas plays and parties and replacing them with "holiday parties" and "winter festivals". Seabaugh said "I want people to know it's perfectly OK to say 'Merry Christmas' and have a Christmas pageant or a Christmas dance." Seabaugh's bill would closely resemble one previously passed in Texas earlier in 2013.

=== Budget issues ===
Long-running disputes over Louisiana's budget issues and the state's use of nonrecurring revenue to balance the budget led several members, including Seabaugh, to form a group known as the "Fiscal Hawks" to oppose budgeting by Governor Bobby Jindal which they viewed as irresponsible. However, in 2013, Seabaugh split with the group when it backed $329 million in revenue enhancements which largely consisted of the expiration of tax credits and exemptions passed by then Governor Jindal.

Seabaugh served as vice chairman of the Louisiana Republican legislative delegation from 2012 to 2016.

==== Tax votes ====
In March 2016, with the election of Democratic Governor John Bel Edwards, Seabaugh emerged as an opponent of tax increases.

In 2017, Seabaugh was appointed to the House Ways and Means Committee which controls state tax policy. Seabaugh has consistently opposed proposed tax increases.

In May 2017, Seabaugh emerged as a strong opponent of Governor John Bel Edwards' proposed increase in the gasoline tax and further called for the abolition of 3,000 of the 4,700 positions in the Louisiana Department of Transportation and Development.

=== Support for prosecuting women who get abortions for murder ===
Seabaugh voted for a Louisiana state draft bill that would ban in vitro fertilization (IVF) treatments and some forms of birth control and prosecute women who get abortions for murder. The draft bill has no exceptions for rape, incest, or the protection of the life of the mother and could also criminalize miscarriages.

== Consideration for federal judgeship ==
In 2017, U.S. President Donald Trump nominated Seabaugh for the seat held by Dee Drell on the United States District Court for the Western District of Louisiana. Drell had assumed senior status. Months passed, and the United States Senate did not act on the appointment. Therefore, in January 2019, Seabaugh announced that he was withdrawing from consideration for the judgeship. Instead, he sought reelection to the state House and if successful contest the House Speaker's position vacated by Republican Taylor Barras of New Iberia in January 2020. However, Seabaugh did not run for House Speaker.

== Personal life and education ==
Seabaugh graduated from Captain Shreve High School in 1985 and received his Bachelor of Arts degree from Louisiana State University in 1990. In 1993, he received his J.D. degree from the Paul M. Hebert Law Center at LSU. Seabaugh is married to Laura (McClelland), and they have four daughters.
