= Edwin Adams Davis =

American historian

- Born: May 10, 1904; Alba, Missouri, USA
- Died: April 24, 1994 (aged 89)
- Education: Kansas State Teachers College; University of Iowa; Louisiana State University
- Occupations: Historian; Professor at Louisiana State University
- Spouse: La Verna Mae Rowe Davis
- Children: Edwin Adams Davis Jr
- Parent(s): Frank Byrd and Willie Belle Greever Davis

President of the Louisiana Historical Association
- Succeeded by: Kenneth Trist Urquhart

Edwin Adams Davis (May 10, 1904 – April 24, 1994) was an American historian who specialized in studies of his adopted state of Louisiana. A long-time professor at Louisiana State University in Baton Rouge, he was particularly known for two textbooks, Louisiana: A Narrative History and Louisiana: The Pelican State, the latter for middle schools and coauthored with Joe Gray Taylor of McNeese State University in Lake Charles, Louisiana .

== Background ==
A Missouri native, Davis was the son of Frank Byrd Davis (1873–1932) and the former Willie Belle Greever (1873–1913), who died when Davis was eight or nine. Davis married La Verna Mae Rowe (1905 - 1990), and they had one child, Edwin Adams Davis Jr.

Davis graduated from Kansas State Teachers College, now Emporia State University in Emporia, Kansas, and received his advanced degrees at the University of Iowa in Iowa City, Iowa and LSU.

== Academic career ==
In addition to his professorial duties at LSU, Davis is considered the "father of the Louisiana state archives." There were no state archives prior to 1936 even though no other state possessed the volume and variety of European colonial and American territorial records as did Louisiana. Davis convinced the LSU administration to develop a systematic preservation of state records. The state legislature in 1936 empowered the university archives to act as the depository for public records of state government, a role which LSU filled for two decades.

In 1940, under Governor Sam Houston Jones, the legislature declared nearly all state records public property and opened access to most files. In 1954, Davis took temporary leave of his post at LSU to spearhead the establishment of the archives. He had acquired experience for this undertaking by having worked during the New Deal in a Historic Records Survey. Davis became the chief consultant to the survey of the archives undertaken from 1954 to 1956. The State Archives and Records Act of 1956 expanded provisions of the Public Records Act of 1940 and established the State Archives and Records Service as an independent agency.

Governor Earl Kemp Long on his return to office in 1956 vetoed operating funds for the archives. Davis and his colleague, John C. L. Andreassen, the first director of the state archives, managed to obtain an emergency appropriation of $43,140 from the Louisiana Board of Liquidation. In addition to the lack of funding, space for the records was at a premium. In the next legislative session, the archives received its first regular appropriation. With this revenue, the archives were relocated to permanent headquarters in Peabody Hall on the LSU campus adjacent to the Louisiana State Capitol.

Davis was the first president of the reorganized Louisiana Historical Association. At a statewide meeting held on March 29, 1958, on the campus of Baptist-affiliated Louisiana College in Pineville, thirty-five new members were added. The charter was revised in a subsequent meeting at Memorial Hall on the LSU campus on June 6, 1958. There Davis was named as LHA president, Kenneth Trist Urquhart was chosen as vice-president, and John C. L. Andreassen, secretary-treasurer.

== Notable publications ==
In addition to his textbooks, Davis was author of Fallen Guidon: The Saga of Confederate General Jo Shelby's March to Mexico, published first in 1962 and again in 1995, a year after Davis; death, by Texas A&M University Press. After the Battle of Appomattox Court House in April 1865, some Confederates remained steadfast to what is sometimes known as the Lost Cause. One particular group led by General Joseph O. Shelby of Missouri, followed its cavalry flag, or guidon, south with the goal of planting an imperial colony in Mexico. Shelby declared that he and his men preferred exile from the United States to submission to the Union Army. Shelby was motivated by the report that U.S. President Abraham Lincoln wanted the Habsburg emperor Maximilian, I, driven out of Mexico, and Shelby proposed to join forces with Benito Juarez for that purpose. He expected to prevail and spread the Lost Cause to a new land. Davis was a descendant of one of Shelby's men.

Other Davis works include:

- The Rivers and Bayous of Louisiana
- The Barber of Natchez with William Ransom Hogan, LSU Press, 1973; the story of William Johnson, a slave who rose to freedom, business success, and high community standing in Natchez, Mississippi, all before 1850.
- "Diary of William Newton Mercer" of Henry Miller Shreve Expedition, Journal of Southern History, with John C. L. Andreassen (1936).
- Of the Night Wind's Telling: Legends from the Valley of Mexico, folklore (1946).

== See also ==
Davis' LSU historian colleagues included:

- Mark T. Carleton
- John L. Loos
- Burl Noggle
- T. Harry Williams

Preceded by First president under associational reorganization	President of the Louisiana Historical Association; 1958–1959	Succeeded by Kenneth Trist Urquhart
