= KNWD =

Student-run radio station at Northwestern State University of Louisiana

- Natchitoches, Louisiana; United States
- Broadcast area: Natchitoches Parish
- Frequency: 91.7 MHz
- Branding: The Demon

Programming
- Format: College/Alternative

Ownership
- Owner: Northwestern State University of Louisiana; (NSU Board of Trustees)
- Operator: General Manager- Torin Merchant

History
- Founded: April 22, 1974 (carrier current)
- First air date: September 30, 1975 (FM)
- Former call signs: KNSU-AM
- Former frequencies: 640 kHz (carrier current)
- Call sign meaning: NorthWestern Demons

Technical information
- Licensing authority: FCC
- Facility ID: 49791
- Class: A
- ERP: 255 watts
- HAAT: 50 meters (160 ft)
- Transmitter coordinates: 31°44′51.5″N 93°5′47.5″W

Links
- Public license information: Public file; LMS
- Webcast: Listen live (via TuneIn)
- Website: purplemedianetwork.com

KNWD-FM (91.7 FM) is a student-run, non-commercial radio station broadcasting a college format from the campus of Northwestern State University of Louisiana (NSU) and serving Natchitoches, Louisiana. Although the station is licensed to the university's board of trustees, it operates independently from the NSU Department of New Media, Journalism, and Communication Arts; its operations are funded by a student activity fee and its general manager is selected by the Student Media Board. Station staff and management positions are open to all NSU students, as well as students from the Louisiana School for Math, Science, and the Arts.

== History ==
Planning for what would become KNWD began in 1970 with two competing plans being proposed: an independent student-run station or an academic station connected to NSU's Speech and Journalism Department. The departmental proposal was for an AM station that would be used "only as an academic tool", while the student-led proposal was for an independent FM music station.

In October 1973, while still working toward final approval for an over-the-air station, students Mike Price, Russell Morrison, and Gary Lampert launched an unlicensed AM carrier current station, KNSU-AM, in their dorm. In November 1973, students approved a referendum assessing a new 50¢ fee to support the station, pending approval by the state board of education and a license from the Federal Communications Commission.

On April 22, 1974, KNSU-AM went campus-wide on 640 kHz via carrier current, broadcasting primarily contemporary progressive rock from the Russell Library while it awaited an FM license. The station received its non-commercial FM construction permit in August 1974; the application was accelerated by the FCC with the help of the Louisiana congressional delegation. Operating as KNWD-FM (the KNSU call letters having been previously claimed by Nicholls State University), the student-run station officially went on air on September 30, 1975, with the slogan "Creative FM Stereo 91.7."

KNWD-FM continued to operate out of Russell Library (which later became Russell Hall when the library moved to a new building in the 1970s) until 1988, when the station moved across campus to South Hall, which the station referred to on air as "Croce Hall" in honor of 1970s singer-songwriter Jim Croce who died in a plane crash in Natchitoches in 1973. In 1995, the station moved once again to Kyser Hall.

Equipment for the new station was funded through a $4,200 grant and a $6,600 loan from the student government, with the expectation that the loan would be paid back over several years from through the student activity fee assessment. The station also received donations of studio equipment from KTOC(AM) in Jonesboro, Louisiana. Throughout the 1970s, the SGA loan was a bone of contention between the station and student government, until it was repaid in 1977 following an increase in the student activity fee. Over the years, the station hosted a variety of fundraisers to support equipment purchases, including several notable radiothons, such as the 54-hour broadcast from atop the Old Bullard Mansion columns in 1982 and the 1987 homecoming weekend-long "Stairway to Heaven in '87" broadcast from atop Turpin Stadium.

The station transmitter and antenna were initially installed atop Russell Library, operating at 10 watts ERP. To improve coverage, the station moved the antenna to an airport beacon tower at Natchitoches Regional Airport in 1978, before relocating to the top of Harry Turpin Stadium in the mid-1980s, which allowed the station to broadcast at its licensed 255 watts ERP.

In September 1998, KNWD began streaming its signal online, and in 2014 it began streaming via the TuneIn app. Also since 2014, the station has also broadcast RBDS RadioText.

== Programming ==
As of 2020, KNWD programs a mix of "alternative and progressive music not appreciated in mainstream media." It also actively promotes local musicians, both through airplay and events. In addition, the station airs student-written news reports and coverage of Northwestern Demons athletics and NSU events.

Over its history, KNWD has had a variety of formats from progressive rock to Top 40 to album oriented rock, although for most of its history the station has followed a traditionally eclectic college radio format with a variety of specialty shows and some syndicated programming. The degree to which the station adhered to a more "professional" format with restricted playlists has also varied over the years. The station also produces themed Spotify playlists for holidays and events.

== Music festivals ==
KNWD organizes music festivals and concerts on campus featuring local performers, as well as national acts. The station organized its first festival, featuring five local bands, in December 1975; instead of tickets, the station sold KNWD T-shirts for concert-goers to wear.

CaddoFest was a fall pep-rally and music festival held in 2013 and 2015 to complement the annual "Battle for Chief Caddo" football rivalry game against Stephen F. Austin State University. In 2016 and 2017, the station organized Neon Inferno, an EDM and hip-hop festival.

DemonFest is a music festival held in the spring by KNWD. It usually holds up to two or more up-and-coming bands as headliners and well-known local bands. KNWD launched the festival in 2000 in part as a reaction to the university booking Toby Keith for an on-campus concert, which the station felt did not reflect the interests of students. In 2007, the station combined DemonFest with the Natchitoches Jazz & R&B Festival. After a hiatus of several years, DemonFest was restarted by KNWD in 2013. In 2017, weather concerns forced the traditionally outdoor festival into Prather Coliseum. Over the years, the festival has ranged from one day of music to three days.

== Other events ==
KNWD has organized a number of campus and local events over the years. Notably, on Halloween 1982, the station coordinated the move of the campus ghost, Isabella, from the burned ruins of Caldwell Hall to the oldest building on campus, the Old Women's Gymnasium (now Lee H. Nelson Hall and home to the National Center for Preservation Technology and Training). The event involved more than 750 people, a marching band, and a mounted honor guard.

== See also ==
- Campus radio
- List of college radio stations in the United States
