= Vic the Demon =

Northwestern State University mascot

- University: Northwestern State University
- Conference: Southland
- Description: Anthropomorphic purple demon

Vic the Demon is the mascot at Northwestern State University. His name is short for "VICtory." Victor, of course, was also the name of Victor Leander Roy, who was president of the university in 1923, when he issued the proclamation that all athletic teams at the university would be 'the Demons.'

He is most noted as the mascot involved in a fight with Northeast Louisiana University mascot Chief Brave Spirit, in which playful sparring on the sidelines turned into an ugly fight. The two mascots were separated by police, by which time, the headpiece of Vic's costume had been knocked off. As the game was televised, the footage of the brawling mascots was widely broadcast on sports newscasts around the country and still appears on bloopers shows to this day.
