= Ray Tarver =

American dentist and politician

Member of the Louisiana House of Representatives
- In office 1964–1968

Personal details
- Born: Ray Darryl Tarver; December 24, 1921 Natchitoches, Louisiana, U.S.
- Died: December 11, 1972 (aged 50)
- Party: Democratic
- Spouse: Evelyn Youngblood
- Children: 1
- Education: Northwestern State University; Loyola University New Orleans
- Occupation: Dentist

Ray Darryl Tarver (December 24, 1921 – December 11, 1972) was an American politician. A member of the Democratic Party, he served in the Louisiana House of Representatives from 1964 to 1968.

Tarver died on December 11, 1972 at the age of 51.
