= Earl Long =

45th governor of Louisiana

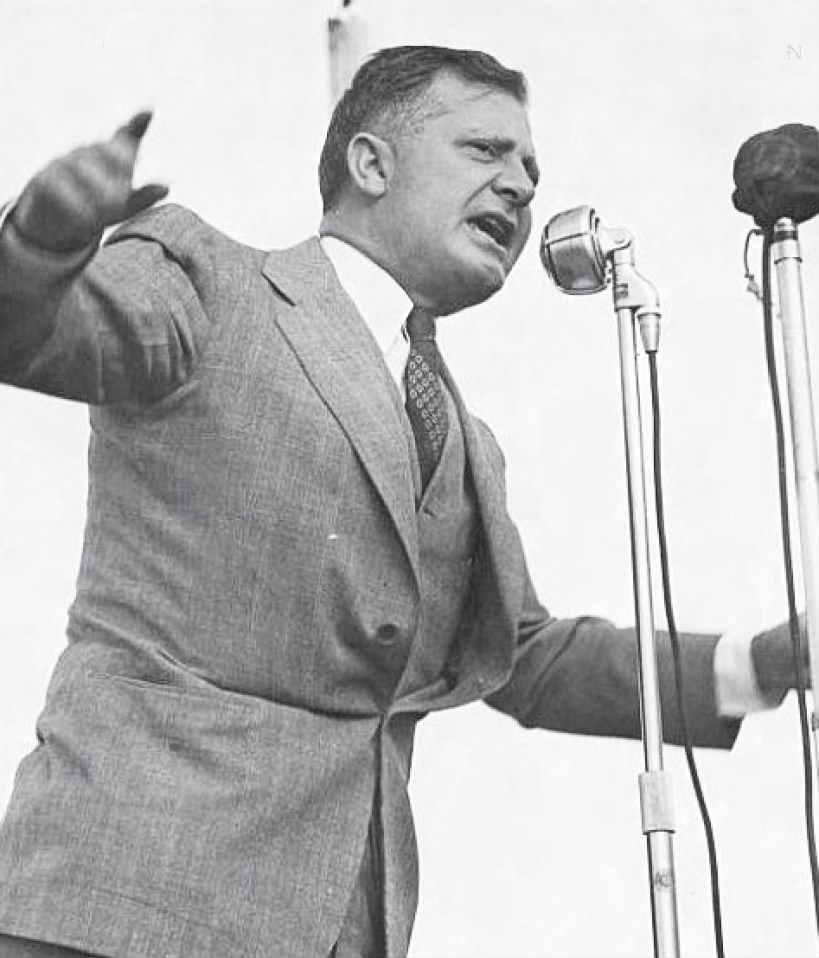

45th Governor of Louisiana
- In office May 15, 1956 – May 10, 1960
- Lieutenant: Lether Frazar
- Preceded by: Robert Kennon
- Succeeded by: Jimmie Davis
- In office May 11, 1948 – May 13, 1952
- Lieutenant: Bill Dodd
- Preceded by: Jimmie Davis
- Succeeded by: Robert Kennon
- In office June 26, 1939 – May 14, 1940
- Lieutenant: Coleman Lindsey
- Preceded by: Richard W. Leche
- Succeeded by: Sam H. Jones

38th Lieutenant Governor of Louisiana
- In office May 12, 1936 – June 26, 1939
- Governor: Richard W. Leche
- Preceded by: James A. Noe
- Succeeded by: Coleman Lindsey

Personal details
- Born: Earl Kemp Long; August 26, 1895 Winnfield, Louisiana, U.S.
- Died: September 5, 1960 (aged 65) Alexandria, Louisiana, U.S.
- Party: Democratic
- Spouse: Blanche Revere
- Relatives: Long family
- Education: Louisiana State University; Tulane University; Loyola University New Orleans (LLB)

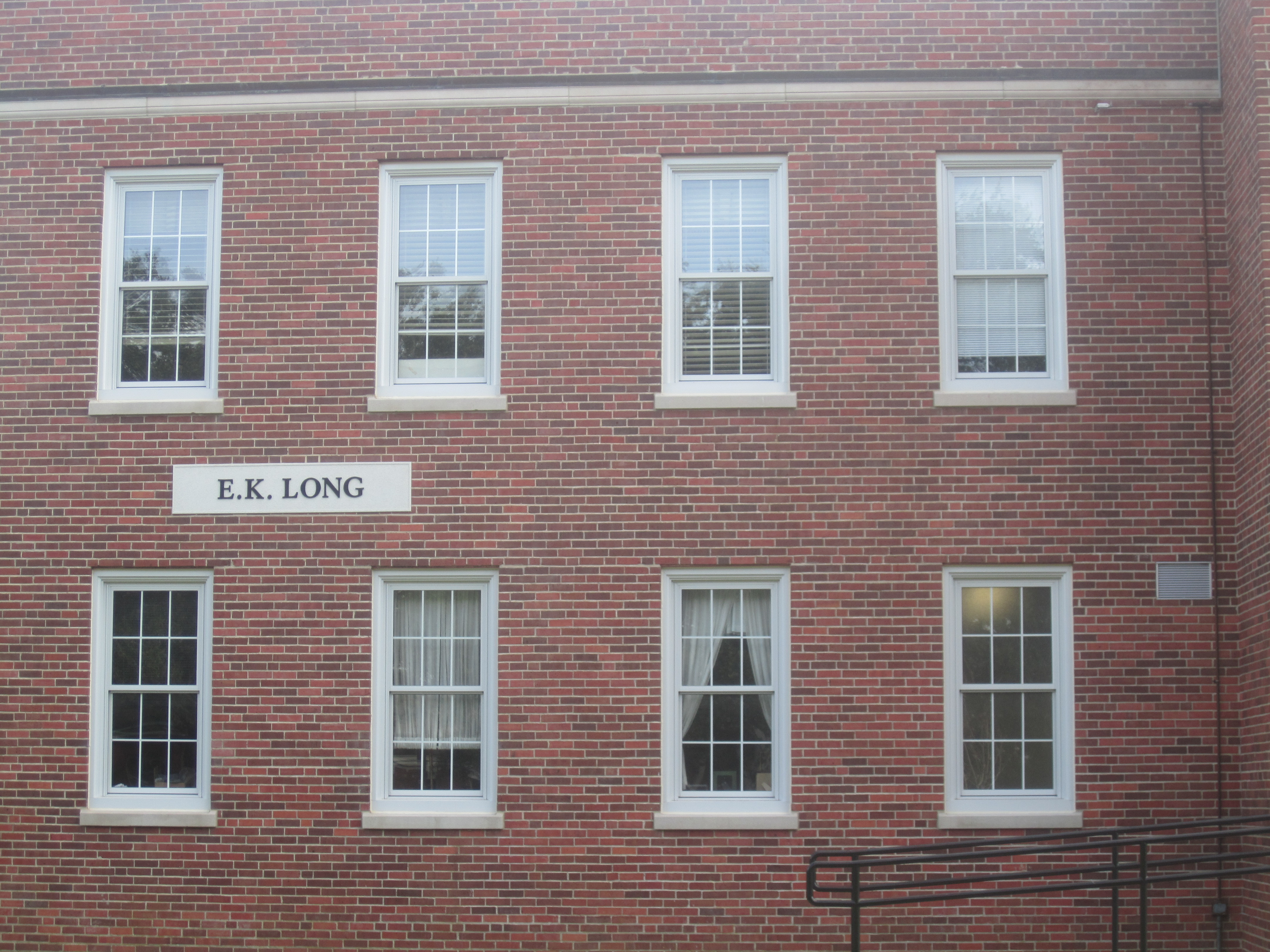
The Earl K. Long Gymnasium at the University of Louisiana at Lafayette

Earl Kemp Long (August 26, 1895 – September 5, 1960) was an American politician who served as the 45th governor of Louisiana on three occasions (1939–1940, 1948–1952, and 1956–1960). A member of the Democratic Party, he held the same position that his brother, Huey Long, held years earlier (1928–1932).

Long served as lieutenant governor of Louisiana from 1936 to 1939. Trying to keep a close hand in state government, he failed in three other bids to be elected lieutenant governor, in 1932, 1944, and 1959. Long was nominated in the summer of 1960 to the United States House of Representatives for Louisiana's 8th congressional district, and was running unopposed in the general election, but he died before he could take office.

During his career, Long promoted a progressive agenda by expanding school-lunch programs, teacher pay, public-works projects, and minority voting rights. Known as "Uncle Earl", Long connected with voters through his folksy demeanor and colorful oratory. His sometimes erratic behavior – including a liaison with New Orleans stripper Blaze Starr – did not affect his electoral success.

== First races for governor ==
Long first ran unsuccessfully for governor in 1932 without the support of his brother, Governor and U.S. Senator-elect Huey Long, who was committed in that election to the successful candidates, Oscar K. Allen of Winnfield for governor and John B. Fournet of St. Martinville for lieutenant governor. In his autobiography, Every Man a King, Huey Long said that Earl Long's first candidacy for lieutenant governor brought forth charges of a family dynasty in the making.

"I sought to discourage [Earl], stating that it would be disastrous for a brother to undertake to have a brother succeed him [as governor] or to have him elected as lieutenant governor. It was already being charged that I was a dictator and that I had allowed many relatives to be placed on the state payrolls (nepotism). To have added a family name to the head of the ticket either for governor or lieutenant governor would have been disastrous to the whole ticket. My brothers and sisters, however, could not see the matter in that light. I gave everyone to understand that I was irrevocably committed to Allen for Governor and Fournet for Lieutenant Governor. ... I finally declared openly and publicly that I would not be [Earl]'s supporter for either office; that I was under lasting obligations to others; that I had done the best I could for my brother, but that I could not and would not undertake to persuade any of the candidates to whom I had given my promise to step aside. ..."

Not long after Huey Long's assassination, however, Earl Long handily defeated fellow Democrat Clement Murphy Mos (much later a judge in Lake Charles) in the primary held for lieutenant governor in January 1936. Richard W. Leche of New Orleans was elected governor in 1936, but he resigned in scandal in 1939, and Long succeeded for 11 months to the governorship.

== Governorships ==
=== 1939–1940 ===
Long failed to win a gubernatorial term of his own in the election of 1940. During his abbreviated term, Long appointed a cousin, Floyd Harrison Long Sr., as the custodian of the Central State (Mental) Hospital in Pineville. Earl Long's brief first tenure corresponded with the "Louisiana Hayride" scandals that engulfed both Governor Leche and the president of Louisiana State University in Baton Rouge, James Monroe Smith.

Long was defeated in the Democratic primary by the conservative lawyer Sam H. Jones of Lake Charles. After the abbreviated governorship, with Coleman Lindsey of Minden as lieutenant governor, Long was indicted in New Orleans on charges of embezzlement and extortion. The charges involved placing a "deadhead" (an unneeded state worker who performs few or no duties) on the payroll of a special state board.

=== 1944 election ===
In 1944, Long did not run for governor as many had expected, but instead for his earlier position as lieutenant governor on an intraparty ticket with former U.S. Representative Lewis L. Morgan of Covington in St. Tammany Parish across Lake Pontchartrain from New Orleans. Long led the party balloting for the second position in state government, but he lost the runoff to J. Emile Verret of New Iberia, the choice of incoming Governor Jimmie Davis. His previous elected position was as a member and president of the Iberia Parish School Board.

Had Lewis Morgan not entered the second primary against Jimmie Davis, Long would have become lieutenant governor without a runoff. At the time, Louisiana law provided that there would be no statewide constitutional runoff elections unless there was also a second contest for governor. That rule did not apply to state legislative races, however. In the same campaign, the Long-endorsed candidate for attorney general, state Senator Joe T. Cawthorn of Mansfield, lost to the Davis-backed Fred S. LeBlanc.

Long blamed his failure to become lieutenant governor in 1944 on Louisiana Secretary of State Wade O. Martin Jr., a former ally with whom he quarreled for many years thereafter. Years later, he repaid Martin politically. In 1957, Long pushed through a new law, taking jurisdiction of insurance and voting machines from the secretary of state's office and setting up two new patronage positions. Long appointed Rufus D. Hayes of Baton Rouge as the first insurance commissioner and Drayton Boucher of Webster Parish as the commissioner of voting machines. After Boucher decided not to run for office in the 1959–1960 election cycle, Long appointed Douglas Fowler of Red River Parish, who held the job for more than 20 years.

=== 1948–1952 ===
In 1948, Long was elected governor to succeed Jimmie Davis. At the time, the salary was $12,000 annually. Long defeated his old rival Sam Jones by a wide margin. Eliminated in the first primary was U.S. Representative James Hobson "Jimmy" Morrison of Hammond, who made his third and final gubernatorial bid. Long appointed A.A. Fredericks as his executive secretary. Harvey Locke Carey of Shreveport was the campaign manager for northwest Louisiana and later the short-term U. S. Attorney for the United States District Court for the Western District of Louisiana.

The Memphis Commercial Appeal criticized Long's election as governor in 1948. Long "promised everything but the moon"—old-age pensions, veterans bonuses, and a new highway system. "The voters took him at his word, for they elected him by the largest majority ever given a Louisiana candidate [in a gubernatorial runoff contest]. That may be something in the nature of poetic justice, for the majority of voters will be getting exactly what was promised them, and for which they asked, whether they knew it or not." During the second half of his four-year term, Governor Long became close to Margaret Dixon, the first woman managing editor of the Baton Rouge Morning Advocate. She often advised him on political strategy. In 1951, he appointed her to the LSU Board of Supervisors. Long suffered a major heart attack in 1950, but recovered.

In 1950, Long struck a deal with his intraparty rival, Mayor deLesseps Story Morrison, to return home rule to the Crescent City, which at the time was being virtually governed out of Baton Rouge. Morrison agreed not to work against Long's nephew, Russell B. Long, who was successfully seeking a full term in the United States Senate. Instead, Morrison formally endorsed one of Long's rivals, Malcolm Lafargue, the former U. S. attorney for the United States District Court for the Western District of Louisiana, based in Shreveport. Though Morrison "endorsed" Lafargue, he privately urged his followers to support Russell Long, whom he fully expected to win the race, anyway.

=== 1952–1956 interim period ===
Term-limited and unable to run in the 1951–1952 elections, Long essentially sat out the statewide elections. According to Garry Boulard's book, The Big Lie (2001), Long proved instrumental during the 1951–1952 campaign in charges of communism made against gubernatorial candidate Hale Boggs of New Orleans. Rival candidate Lucille May Grace attacked him publicly, but Boulard believes this was rigged by Plaquemines Parish boss Leander Perez. At a stormy session of the state Democratic committee, Long attacked Perez and Grace for attacking Boggs, but prevented Boggs from publicly defending himself. Some analysts thought this strategy greatly contributed to Boggs' defeat in the primary. Judge Robert F. Kennon of Minden won as governor, although most loyal Longites had lined up with Judge Carlos Spaht of Baton Rouge.

=== 1956–1960 ===
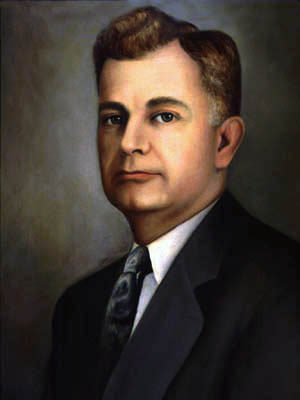
Long's gubernatorial portrait

Long surfaced at the top of the state again in 1955–1956, when he scored an easy victory for governor over a field that included Mayor of New Orleans deLesseps Story "Chep" Morrison Sr., a law partner of Hale Boggs; state highway director Fred Preaus of Farmerville, the choice of outgoing Governor Robert Kennon; former state police superintendent Francis Grevemberg; and businessman James M. McLemore of Alexandria. As Louisiana governors rarely won in the first primary, Long's first response on his victory was, "Huey never done that, did he?" In his second race for the office, McLemore ran on a primarily racial segregationist platform, following the ruling by the US Supreme Court in Brown v. Board of Education (1954) that segregated public schools were unconstitutional.

In 1956, Long vetoed funding for the work undertaken by the LSU historian Edwin Adams Davis to establish the state archives. Davis appealed to the State Board of Liquidation for temporary relief until funding could be restored in the next legislative session. The archives became a permanent institution in Baton Rouge.

Long eased the governmental indignities placed on African Americans and allowed a considerable number to vote. He convinced the legislature to equalize teacher pay between the races. In 1959, in response to legislative attempts to restrict the suffrage, he called for full participation by blacks in Louisiana elections. He knew that he would attract most of the limited black vote, as most were still restricted by barriers to voter registration. In the 1950s, he quarreled with the state's leading segregationist, then state Senator William M. Rainach of Claiborne Parish.

Long reappointed A.A. Fredericks as his executive secretary from 1959 to 1960, his last two years of his last term as governor. He appointed another confidante, former legislator Drayton Boucher of Springhill and later Baton Rouge, as interim "Custodian of voting machines" from 1958 to 1959, as he took the responsibility from the Secretary of State. Long supported another ally, Douglas Fowler of Coushatta, who won the position in 1960 after it was established as an elective office.

On three occasions, Long tapped Lorris M. Wimberly of Bienville Parish as Speaker of the Louisiana House of Representatives. In Louisiana, the powerful governor (although limited at the time by nonconsecutive terms) chooses the House Speaker despite the separation of powers. In his last term, Long named Wimberly as director of the state department of public works. In his last gubernatorial term from 1959 to 1960, Long relied heavily on his legislative floor leader, state Representative W.L. Rambo of Georgetown in Grant Parish, in getting bills through the legislature. Rambo was a Long "by marriage", having wed the former Mary Alice Long.

In 1959, Long considered resigning as governor. His loyal lieutenant governor, Lether Frazar of Lake Charles, would have succeeded him as the Louisiana chief executive for some seven months. Under this scenario, Long planned to run again for governor in the December 1959 Democratic primary, but by leaving office early could avoid Louisiana's ban (at the time) on governors' succeeding themselves. He never proceeded with this. Instead, the term-limited Long unsuccessfully sought the lieutenant governorship on a ticket headed by fellow Democrat and wealthy former Governor James A. Noe. Instead, Jimmie Davis was elected to a second non-consecutive term as governor in 1960, having first served from 1944 to 1948. It was said that in 1948 Long followed Davis and in 1960 Davis followed Long.

Long was defeated for lieutenant governor in the 1959 primary by the conservative C. C. "Taddy" Aycock of Franklin in St. Mary Parish in south Louisiana. Aycock also won the January 1960 runoff election over Alexandria Mayor W. George Bowdon Jr. In the 1959 primary, Long lost a race to Sheridan Garrett, 2,563 to 2,068, for a Winn Parish seat on the Louisiana Democratic State Central Committee.

== Social reform ==
Like his brother Huey Long, Earl Long's time as governor saw a number of initiatives in the social field. A $50 pension was provided for the aged, along with bonuses for veterans, while new charity hospitals and trade schools were established. Long also experimented with free hot lunches for all schoolchildren, and also added free ambulance services for charity hospitals and free dental clinics that travelled the state. Increases were also made to teachers' salaries, and for the first time the salaries of black teachers matched those of white teachers. More money was allocated to universities and state colleges, while new school buildings were built. State expenditure was also raised for those in need, such as families with dependent children, while the 1946 Goff Act (which, as noted by one study, “prohibited unions from engaging in coercive tactics during strikes”) was repealed.

During his third term, the legislature voted overwhelmingly for spending on increased assistance grants, a foster care program, teacher retirement, the retirement for certain school employees, school community units, vocational education, scholarships to children of veterans, a minimum wage scale for teachers, retirement pay of certain teachers, and free lunches. During Long's third term, improvements were made in unemployment benefits while a "right-to-work law" was repealed in 1956, with the House of Representatives voting 57-44 and the Senate 21–18 in favour of repeal. As noted by one study, "Repeal proved a boon for organized labor."

== "Uncle Earl" and anecdotes ==
The colorful "Uncle Earl" (so-named because of his relatives, including nephew and U.S. Senator Russell Long) once joked that one day the people of Louisiana would elect "good government, and they won't like it!" Earl Long was a campaigner who attracted crowds while travelling across the state. He would not allow a local person to introduce him or his ticket mates at a rally. Only out-of-parish people could do the honor. Long reasoned that nearly any local person would have made some political enemies who might reject Earl Long just because that person's "enemy" was pro-Long.

Both Earl Long and his brother Huey had grown close to Earl Williamson, a local politician in Caddo Parish. Williamson's son, Don W. Williamson, later recalled Earl Long coming into their town of Vivian and picking up his father to join the Long entourage for a trip to Hot Springs, Arkansas, where they enjoyed drinking buttermilk and horse racing, as well as illicit attractions in the resort city. Long demanded absolute loyalty among his inner circle, often saying that he did not need them to back him when he was right, but when he was wrong. Long's erratic political behavior led the aspiring singer Jay Chevalier to compose in 1959 the song, "The Ballad of Earl K. Long".

=== Long's feud with Dave Pearce ===
In the 1948 Democratic primary, W.E. Anderson of Tangipahoa Parish defeated Dave L. Pearce, a legislator from West Carroll Parish in northeastern Louisiana, for the position of Louisiana Commissioner of Agriculture and Forestry. For the 1952 primary, the Democratic Party renominated Anderson without opposition to a second term. After Anderson died that year, outgoing Governor Long appointed Pearce to finish the term. Pearce won a special election and also served as commissioner during the administration of the anti-Long Governor Robert F. Kennon of Minden.

Long's first lieutenant governor, William J. "Bill" Dodd, in his memoir entitled Peapatch Politics: The Earl Long Era in Louisiana Politics (named for Earl Long's "Peapatch Farm" in Winn Parish), writes that Earl Long developed a "hatred" for Pearce. The governor encouraged state entomologist Sidney McCrory of Ascension Parish to run against Pearce in the 1956 primary election. Dodd did not explain why the relationship between Long and Pearce had declined. McCrory defeated Pearce, but beginning with the 1959 primary, Pearce was nominated by the Democrats for the first of what became four consecutive terms as agriculture commissioner. That year, Earl Long ran for lieutenant governor, but lost to Taddy Aycock. Dodd noted with humor that Long had become irritated with McCrory after inviting him on Long's intraparty ticket in 1956:

"... to harass, and we hoped, defeat Uncle Earl's old political enemy, Dave Pearce. All McCrory could talk about was pesticides and how to get rid of different kinds of crop-killing bugs. His main topic and claim to fame, which dominated all of his speeches, whether he was in cotton country, forestry areas, or the city of New Orleans, was his eradicating the pink boll worms from Louisiana cotton fields. Uncle Earl almost went crazy when he had to listen to ... McCrory killed enough pink boll worms to fill the Atlantic Ocean."

== Eccentricity and hospitalization ==
Long was well known for eccentric behavior, leading some to suspect that he had bipolar disorder. In his last term in office, his wife, Blanche Revere Long (1902–1998), and others attempted to remove him on the grounds of mental instability. For a time, Long was confined to the Southeast Louisiana Hospital in Mandeville, but his legal adviser, Joseph A. Sims, was said to have rescued Long from the institution. Long was never formally diagnosed with any mental disorder. Commentators have speculated that political opposition may have led the effort to prove him mentally incompetent, including his wife, who resented his connection with Starr. He had a severe heart attack in 1951. Additionally, in his later years, he was alleged to have suffered from strokes, resulting in further mental impairment. Some have speculated that he may have suffered from dementia in his last days.

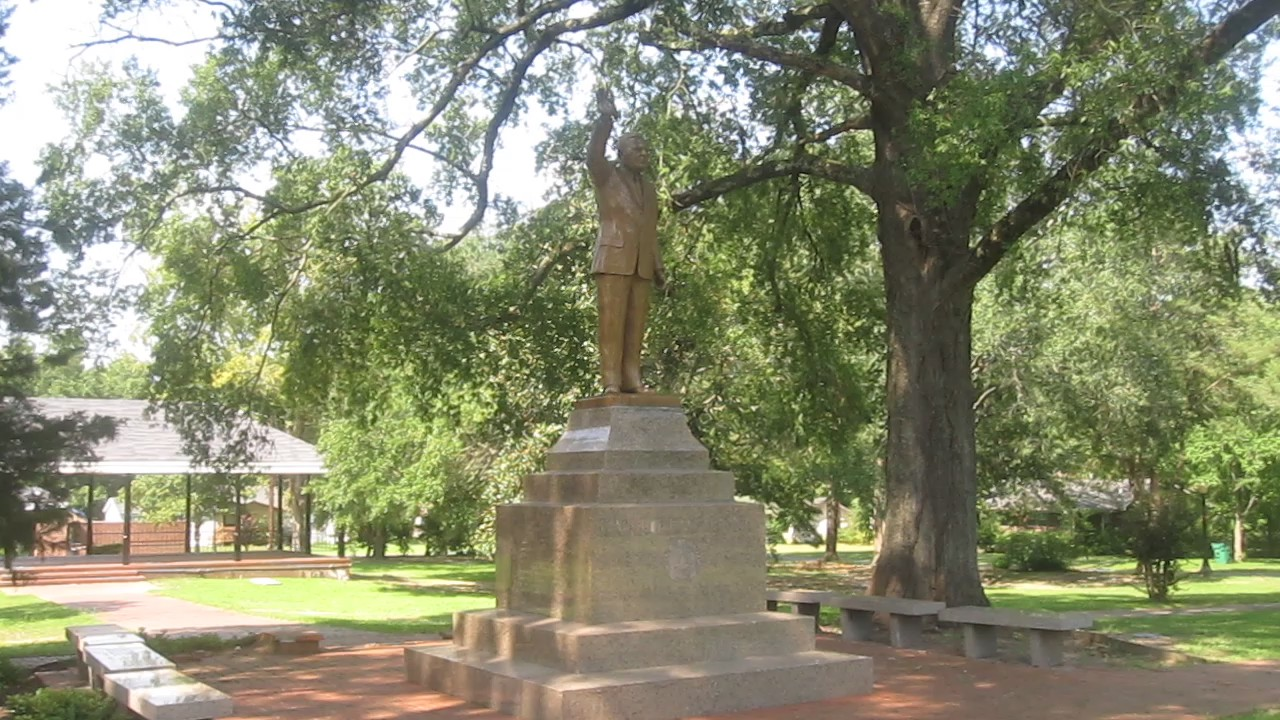
Grave of Earl Kemp Long in Winnfield, Louisiana

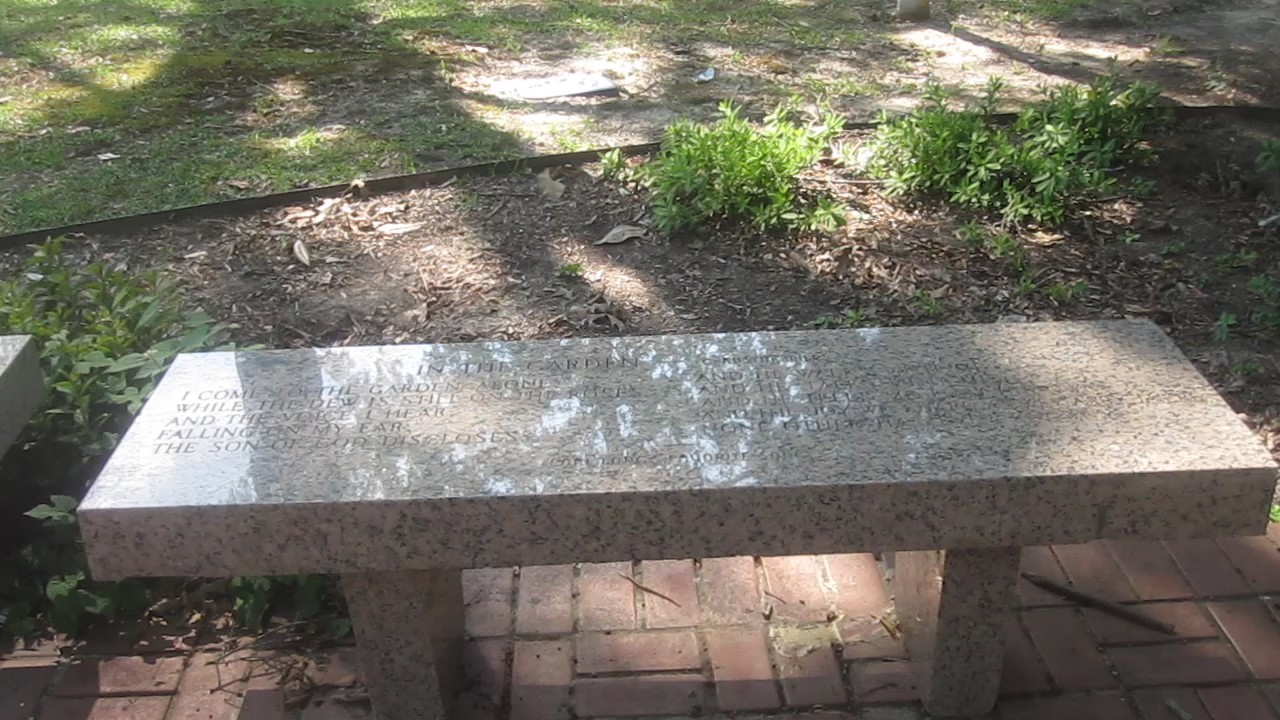
Bench at Earl Long grave inscribed, but blocked from view by the glare, with words of the C. Austin Miles hymn "In the Garden" (1912)

== Presumptive congressman-elect ==
Only a few months after his term as governor expired in 1960, Earl Long ran for the United States House of Representatives from Louisiana's 8th congressional district. An entourage of Long backers from over the years flocked to support him in the race, including Bill Dodd, former Senate floor leader C. H. "Sammy" Downs, state Senator Sixty Rayburn, the Long attorney Joseph A. Sims, and A.A. Fredericks, Long's former executive assistant.

Due to a third candidate, former State Representative Ben F. Holt of Rapides Parish, Long finished in second place in the primary election and was compelled into a runoff contest for the Democratic nomination with the short-term incumbent, Alexandria attorney Harold B. McSween, which Long won. Because no Republican filed for the seat, Long was poised to run unopposed in the general election set for November 8, 1960. However, on September 5, 1960, he suffered a fatal heart attack at age 65 while in the Baptist Hospital (later Rapides General Hospital) in Alexandria.

After Earl Long's death, the Democratic State Central Committee gave the nomination to McSween, who had earlier succeeded Earl Long's late brother George Long in the 8th district seat. McSween was thus unopposed in the 1960 general election and won a second consecutive term in the U.S. House. In 1962, McSween was defeated in the primary election by his fellow liberal Democrat, Gillis William Long, who claimed to be the rightful heir to the Long dynasty. His funeral in Baton Rouge attracted numerous attendees. Long was interred at the Earl K. Long Memorial Park in Winnfield. His nephew, U.S. Senator Russell Long, was among the pallbearers.

Political offices
Preceded by James A. Noe	Lieutenant Governor of Louisiana; 1936–1939	Succeeded by Coleman Lindsey
Preceded by Richard W. Leche	Governor of Louisiana; 1939–1940	Succeeded by Sam H. Jones
Preceded by Jimmie Davis	Governor of Louisiana; 1948–1952	Succeeded by Robert Kennon
Preceded by Robert Kennon	Governor of Louisiana; 1956–1960	Succeeded by Jimmie Davis
Party political offices
Preceded by John B. Fournet	Democratic nominee for Lieutenant Governor of Louisiana; 1936	Succeeded by Marc M. Mouton
Preceded by Jimmie Davis	Democratic nominee for Governor of Louisiana; 1948	Succeeded by Robert Kennon
Preceded by Robert Kennon	Democratic nominee for Governor of Louisiana; 1956	Succeeded by Jimmie Davis
