= Coleman Lindsey =

American politician

Coleman Lindsey (died November 7, 1968) was an American politician who served in the Louisiana Senate from 1924 to 1928 and 1932 to 1939 as a Democrat, when he became the lieutenant governor of Louisiana.

Lindsey died at the age of 76 on November 7, 1968.
