= P. K. Smith =

American politician (1917–1983)

Member of the Louisiana House of Representatives
- In office 1960–1964
- Preceded by: Ashton B. Collier
- Succeeded by: Ashton B. Collier

Personal details
- Born: September 21, 1917 Winnfield, Louisiana, U.S.
- Died: March 25, 1983 (aged 65)
- Party: Democratic
- Spouse: Margie Smith
- Children: 2; including Mike Smith

P. K. Smith (September 21, 1917 – March 25, 1983) was an American politician. He served as a Democratic member of the Louisiana House of Representatives.

== Life and career ==
Smith was born in Winnfield, Louisiana. He was a businessperson and the owner of the Huey Long Motel.

In 1960, Smith was elected to the Louisiana House of Representatives, succeeding Ashton B. Collier. He served until 1964, when he was succeeded by Collier.

Smith died in March 1983 at the Humana Hospital-Winn Parish, at the age of 65.
