= Harold B. McSween =

American politician (1926–2002)

Harold Barnett McSween
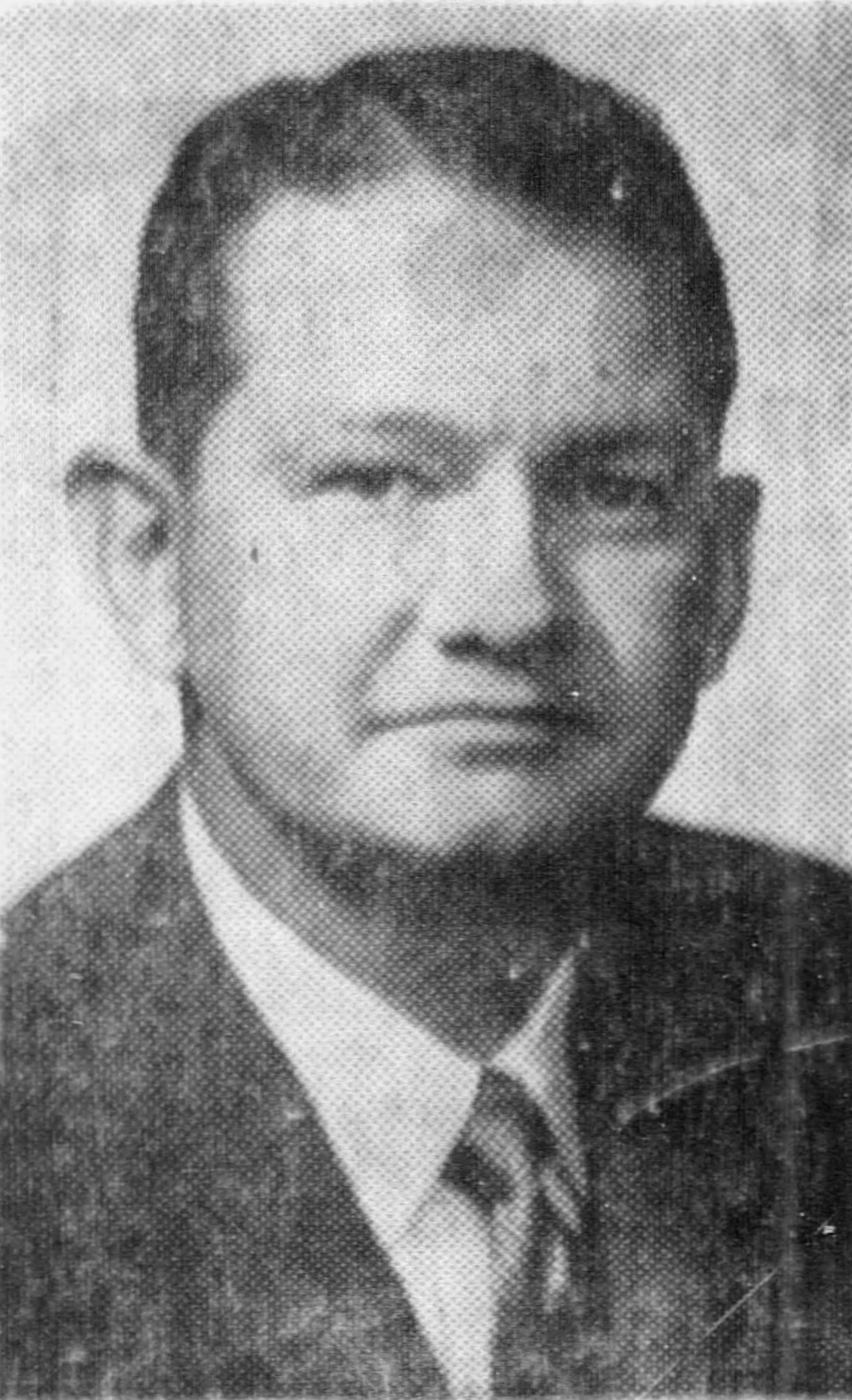

Member of the U.S. House of Representatives from Louisiana's 8th district
- In office January 3, 1959 – January 3, 1963
- Preceded by: George S. Long
- Succeeded by: Gillis William Long

Personal details
- Born: July 19, 1926 Alexandria, Louisiana, U.S.
- Died: January 12, 2002 (aged 75) Alexandria, Louisiana, U.S.
- Resting place: Greenwood Memorial Park in Pineville, Louisiana
- Party: Democratic
- Education: Louisiana State University
- Occupation: Savings and loan association president

Military service
- Branch/service: United States Army Air Corps
- Years of service: World War II

Harold Barnett McSween (July 19, 1926 – January 12, 2002), was a Louisiana politician who served in Louisiana's Eighth District for two terms as a Democrat.

McSween was born, and died, in Alexandria, Louisiana.

U.S. House of Representatives
Preceded by George S. Long	United States Representative for the 8th Congressional District of Louisiana; 1959–1963	Succeeded by Gillis William Long
