= Blanche Long =

First Lady of Louisiana from 1939 to 1940, 1948 to 1952, and 1956 to 1960

Member of the Louisiana Tax Commission
- In office May 20, 1964 – December 24, 1976
- Governor: John McKeithen; Edwin Edwards
- Preceded by: Charles Porpora
- Succeeded by: Jamar Adcock

First Lady of Louisiana
- In role May 8, 1956 – May 10, 1960
- Governor: Earl Long
- Preceded by: Eugenia Kennon
- Succeeded by: Alvern Davis
- In role May 11, 1948 – May 13, 1952
- Governor: Earl Long
- Preceded by: Alvern Davis
- Succeeded by: Eugenia Kennon
- In role June 26, 1939 – May 14, 1940
- Governor: Earl Long
- Preceded by: Elton Leche
- Succeeded by: Louise Jones

Personal details
- Born: Blanche Beulah Revere; December 17, 1902; Covington, Louisiana, U.S.
- Died: May 11, 1998 (aged 95); Covington, Louisiana, U.S.
- Political party: Democratic
- Spouse: Earl Long (m. 1932; died 1960)
- Parents: Robert H. Revere; Beulah Talley

Blanche Beulah Revere Long (née Revere; December 17, 1902 – May 11, 1998) was the first lady of the state of Louisiana, serving three nonconsecutive terms.

Raised in New Orleans, she married Earl Long in 1932 and was active in his successful bids for lieutenant governor and governor of Louisiana. She was the first lady of Louisiana from 1939 to 1940, 1948–1952, and 1956–1960. In 1959, after Earl's increasingly erratic behavior including a highly publicized affair with stripper Blaze Starr, Blanche attempted to have him involuntarily committed to a psychiatric hospital, but failed when he used the governor's authority to dismiss the hospital's administrator.

After Earl's death in 1960, Blanche Long remained active in Louisiana politics. She was the campaign manager for John McKeithen's successful 1964 gubernatorial campaign, and served on the Louisiana Tax Commission from 1964 to 1976.

== Early life and education ==
Blanche Beulah Revere was born on December 17, 1902, in Covington, Louisiana. She was the second daughter of Robert H. Revere and Beulah Revere (née Talley). When Revere was two years old, her family moved to New Orleans, where she spent most of her early life.

Revere attended Tulane University for three years, studying psychology and commercial law, before switching to secretarial school at Soule Business College. Upon graduation, she worked as a secretary to the president of an electric company.

Revere met attorney Earl Kemp Long, brother of then-governor of Louisiana Huey Long, in 1928. They were married in Estes Park, Colorado on August 17, 1932, at the home of Long's sister, Callie.

== First Lady of Louisiana ==
=== Involvement in Earl Long's campaigns ===
Long had little interest in politics before meeting her future husband but eventually came to enjoy it, according to John Hunt, a nephew of Earl. She managed his state headquarters and campaigned at his side during his successful run for lieutenant governor of Louisiana in 1936. Long assumed the role of First Lady of Louisiana when Governor Richard W. Leche resigned.

=== Hospitalization of Earl Long ===
Earl Long became increasingly erratic during his last term as governor (1956–1960), including compulsive betting on horse races and beginning a highly publicized affair with Blaze Starr, a 26-year-old stripper. In May 1959, Blanche Long, with the help of Earl's nephew, U.S. Senator Russell B. Long, had Earl flown to Galveston, Texas to be committed to a psychiatric hospital. In a compromise, Earl agreed to seek treatment at a psychiatric hospital in New Orleans, but voluntarily left one day after he checked in. Blanche then arranged to have Earl involuntarily committed to Southeast Louisiana Hospital, but Earl fired the hospital's administrator and replaced him with a new one who released him.

Earl filed a separation suit against Blanche in June 1959; he died the following year shortly after his election to the U.S. House of Representatives.

== Later life ==
=== 1964 Louisiana gubernatorial election ===
She was the campaign manager for John McKeithen's successful 1964 bid for governor of Louisiana. McKeithen had been the state house floor manager for Earl Long from 1948 to 1952. After he became governor, McKeithen named Long as chairwoman of the Louisiana Tax Commission. In the Democratic primary, he defeated Gillis Long, who was distantly related to Earl Long and was backed by U.S. Senator Russell Long, Earl's nephew. During the campaign, Blanche predicted that McKeithen would "make an Earl Long-type Governor because he believes in the same philosophy."

=== Louisiana tax commissioner ===
After winning the gubernatorial election, McKeithen appointed Long to the three-member Louisiana Tax Commission to fill the remainder of Charles Porpora's term after Porpora's resignation. She was confirmed by the Louisiana State Senate on May 20, 1964. In January 1965, Long was appointed to a full six-year term on the commission. She was reappointed by McKeithen to another term in 1971. She served until 1976; governor Edwin Edwards appointed Jamar Adcock to succeed her.

=== Death ===
Long died on May 11, 1998, at a nursing home in Covington, Louisiana.
