= Georgetown, Louisiana =

- Village
- Location of Georgetown in Grant Parish, Louisiana.

- Location of Louisiana in the United States
- Coordinates: 31°45′35″N 92°22′40″W
- Country: United States
- State: Louisiana
- Parish: Grant

Area
  - Total: 1.30 sq mi (3.37 km^{2})
  - Land: 1.30 sq mi (3.36 km^{2})
  - Water: 0.0039 sq mi (0.01 km^{2})
- Elevation: 92 ft (28 m)

Population (2020)
  - Total: 277
  - Density: 213.3/sq mi (82.34/km^{2})
- Time zone: UTC-6 (CST)
  - Summer (DST): UTC-5 (CDT)
- Area code: 318
- FIPS code: 22-28660
- GNIS feature ID: 2407462

Georgetown is a village in Grant Parish, Louisiana, United States. It is part of the Alexandria, Louisiana Metropolitan Statistical Area. As of the 2020 census, Georgetown had a population of 277.

== History ==
The Harrisonburg Road ran through the area, connecting northeast to the Natchez Trace and running southwest into Texas to connect with El Camino Real.

Georgetown, which is crossed by U.S. Route 165, has been described as a speed trap. In 2020, the city generated 93% of its operating revenue from traffic tickets.

== Geography ==
Georgetown is located in the northeast corner of Grant Parish. U.S. Route 165 runs through the village, leading northeast 31 miles (50 km) to Columbia and south 33 miles (53 km) to Alexandria.

According to the United States Census Bureau, Georgetown has a total area of 1.3 square miles (3.4 km^{2}), of which 0.004 square miles (0.01 km^{2}), or 0.25%, is water.

== Demographics ==
Historical population
Census	Pop.	Note	%±
1950	355		—
1960	321		−9.6%
1970	306		−4.7%
1980	381		24.5%
1990	273		−28.3%
2000	301		10.3%
2010	327		8.6%
2020	277		−15.3%
2025 (est.)	276	▼	−0.4%
U.S. Decennial Census

As of the census of 2000, there were 301 people, 126 households, and 86 families residing in the village. The population density was 231.0 inhabitants per square mile (89.2/km^{2}). There were 153 housing units at an average density of 117.4 units per square mile (45.3 units/km^{2}). The racial makeup of the village was 100.00% White, and Hispanic or Latino of any race were 1.00% of the population.

There were 126 households, out of which 34.9% had children under the age of 18 living with them, 49.2% were married couples living together, 15.1% had a female householder with no husband present, and 31.0% were non-families. 28.6% of all households were made up of individuals, and 18.3% had someone living alone who was 65 years of age or older. The average household size was 2.39 and the average family size was 2.92.

In the village, the population was spread out, with 28.9% under the age of 18, 9.0% from 18 to 24, 28.6% from 25 to 44, 19.6% from 45 to 64, and 14.0% who were 65 years of age or older. The median age was 34 years. For every 100 females, there were 87.0 males. For every 100 females age 18 and over, there were 79.8 males.

The median income for a household in the village was $23,750, and the median income for a family was $32,750. Males had a median income of $25,000 versus $18,750 for females. The per capita income for the village was $13,167. About 18.7% of families and 22.1% of the population were below the poverty line, including 40.7% of those under the age of eighteen and 26.2% of those 65 or over.

== Education ==
Georgetown residents are zoned to Grant Parish School Board schools.

== Notable person ==
- Willard Lloyd Rambo, member of the state House from 1952 to 1960
