= Dennis Bamburg Jr. =

American politician

Member of the Louisiana House of Representatives from the 5th district
- Incumbent
- Assumed office January 8, 2024
- Preceded by: Alan Seabaugh

Personal details
- Party: Republican
- Education: University of Louisiana at Monroe (BS)

Dennis Bamburg Jr. is an American politician serving as a member of the Louisiana House of Representatives from the 5th district, representing Bossier Parish, Caddo Parish, and Red River Parish. He assumed office on January 8, 2024.

== Career ==
Bamburg is a former member of the Bossier Parish School Board, elected in 2014. He was elected unopposed to the 5th district seat in the Louisiana House of Representatives.

Louisiana House of Representatives
Preceded by Alan Seabaugh	Louisiana State Representative for District 4 (Bossier Parish, Caddo Parish, Red River Parish); 2024 –	Succeeded by Incumbent
