= Louie Bernard =

American politician

Member of the Louisiana Senate from the 31st district
- In office January 13, 2020 – January 8, 2024
- Preceded by: Gerald Long
- Succeeded by: Alan Seabaugh

Personal details
- Party: Republican

Louie Bernard is an American politician from the state of Louisiana. A Republican, Bernard represented the 31st district of the Louisiana State Senate, based in Central Louisiana, from 2020 to 2024.

From 1991 until 2016, Bernard served as Clerk of Court for Natchitoches Parish. He was first elected to the Senate in 2019, succeeding term-limited Republican incumbent Gerald Long.
