= Louisiana's 8th congressional district =

Former Congressional district of US state

- Obsolete district
- Created: 1913
- Eliminated: 1993
- Years active: 1913-1993

Louisiana's 8th congressional district was a congressional district which was created in 1913 and eliminated in 1993 after Louisiana lost its eighth congressional seat in the 1990 U. S. census. For its entire existence, it was based in Alexandria and included much of the north-central part of the state.

Beginning in 1972, the district was redrawn at the direction of Governor Edwin Edwards to take in liberal precincts in northern Baton Rouge, the northern Florida Parishes, and the Mississippi River corridor between Baton Rouge and New Orleans—making Alexandria the district's northern boundary—in order to aid the return to Congress of Gillis Long. It also moved LaSalle Parish, the home of conservative incumbent Speedy Long, who defeated Gillis Long in 1964, into the 5th district.

The last representative for the 8th district was Clyde Holloway, a Republican from Forest Hill in rural Rapides Parish first elected in 1986. In each of his three elections, he defeated a Black Democratic challenger, the last being future Representative Cleo Fields. In 1992, Holloway's home was drawn into the 6th district when Louisiana lost a House seat following the 1990 census, and he was defeated by fellow Republican Richard Baker, who was first elected to the House at the same time as Holloway.

== List of members representing the district ==
Member (Residence)	Party	Years	Cong ress	Electoral history
District created following 1910 census – March 4, 1913
James Benjamin Aswell (Natchitoches)	Democratic	March 4, 1913 – March 16, 1931	63rd 64th 65th 66th 67th 68th 69th 70th 71st 72nd	Elected in 1912. Re-elected in 1914. Re-elected in 1916. Re-elected in 1918. Re-elected in 1920. Re-elected in 1922. Re-elected in 1924. Re-elected in 1926. Re-elected in 1928. Re-elected in 1930. Died.
Vacant		March 16, 1931 – May 12, 1931	72nd	
John H. Overton (Alexandria)	Democratic	May 12, 1931 – March 3, 1933	72nd	Elected to finish Aswell's term. Retired to run for U.S. senator.
Cleveland Dear (Alexandria)	Democratic	March 4, 1933 – January 3, 1937	73rd 74th	Elected in 1932. Re-elected in 1934. Retired to run for governor.
A. Leonard Allen (Winnfield)	Democratic	January 3, 1937 – January 3, 1953	75th 76th 77th 78th 79th 80th 81st 82nd	Elected in 1936. Re-elected in 1938. Re-elected in 1940. Re-elected in 1942. Re-elected in 1944. Re-elected in 1946. Re-elected in 1948. Re-elected in 1950. Retired.
George S. Long (Pineville)	Democratic	January 3, 1953 – March 22, 1958	83rd 84th 85th	Elected in 1952. Re-elected in 1954. Re-elected in 1956. Died.
Vacant		March 22, 1958 – January 3, 1959	85th	
Harold B. McSween (Alexandria)	Democratic	January 3, 1959 – January 3, 1963	86th 87th	Elected in 1958. Re-elected in 1960. Lost renomination.
Gillis William Long (Winnfield)	Democratic	January 3, 1963 – January 3, 1965	88th	Elected in 1962. Lost renomination.
Speedy O. Long (Jena)	Democratic	January 3, 1965 – January 3, 1973	89th 90th 91st 92nd	Elected in 1964. Re-elected in 1966. Re-elected in 1968. Re-elected in 1970. Redistricted to the 5th district and retired.
Gillis William Long (Alexandria)	Democratic	January 3, 1973 – January 20, 1985	93rd 94th 95th 96th 97th 98th 99th	Elected in 1972. Re-elected in 1974. Re-elected in 1976. Re-elected in 1978. Re-elected in 1980. Re-elected in 1982. Re-elected in 1984. Died.
Vacant		January 20, 1985 – March 30, 1985	99th	
Catherine Small Long (Alexandria)	Democratic	March 30, 1985 – January 3, 1987	99th	Elected to finish her husband's term. Retired.
Clyde C. Holloway (Forest Hill)	Republican	January 3, 1987 – January 3, 1993	100th 101st 102nd	Elected in 1986. Re-elected in 1988. Re-elected in 1990. Redistricted to the 6th district and lost re-election there.
District eliminated following 1990 census – January 3, 1993
