= Gillis William Long =

American politician (1923–1985)

Gillis Long
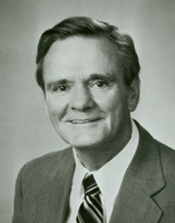

Chair of the House Democratic Caucus
- In office January 3, 1981 – January 3, 1985
- Leader: Tip O'Neill
- Preceded by: Tom Foley
- Succeeded by: Dick Gephardt

Member of the U.S. House of Representatives from Louisiana's 8th district
- In office January 3, 1973 – January 20, 1985
- Preceded by: Speedy Long
- Succeeded by: Catherine Small Long
- In office January 3, 1963 – January 3, 1965
- Preceded by: Harold B. McSween
- Succeeded by: Speedy Long

Personal details
- Born: Gillis William Long; May 4, 1923 Winnfield, Louisiana, U.S.
- Died: January 20, 1985 (aged 61) Washington, D.C., U.S.
- Resting place: Alexandria National Cemetery
- Party: Democratic
- Spouse: Catherine Small (m. 1947)
- Children: 2
- Relatives: Long family
- Education: Louisiana State University (BA, JD)

Military service
- Allegiance: United States
- Branch/service: United States Army
- Years of service: 1941–1947
- Rank: Captain
- Battles/wars: World War II
- Awards: Bronze Star; Purple Heart; Campaign medal (5)

Gillis William Long (May 4, 1923 – January 20, 1985) was an American liberal politician and lawyer who served as a U.S. representative from Louisiana. He was a member of the Long family and cousin of Speedy Long.

== Early life ==
Long was born on May 4, 1923, in Winnfield, Louisiana, to Floyd Harrison Long and Birdie Long. His family moved to Pineville when he was a teenager and he attended Bolton High School. When his cousin Earl Long was running for Lieutenant Governor of Louisiana, Gillis gave campaign speeches for him at his school.

In 1939, Long attended Louisiana State University for law, but was interrupted when he enlisted into the army in 1941 as a private. During World War Two he received a bronze star, five campaign stars, and the Purple Heart, and served at the Nuremberg trials before being discharged as a captain in 1947. Later that year he married Catherine Small, and four years later graduated from college with a bachelor's and a Juris Doctor degree.

== Political career ==
In 1962, he was elected to the House of Representatives from Louisiana's 8th congressional district and was selected to be the assistant Democratic Whip. In 1963, he entered the Democratic primary for the Louisiana gubernatorial race, but came in third place with 15% of the vote. In 1964, he attempted to win reelection, but was defeated by his more openly segregationist cousin Speedy Long. In 1971, he entered the Democratic primary for the gubernatorial race again, but again came in third place, this time with 13% of the vote.

After his cousin Speedy Long retired from office, Gillis Long decided to run for the House seat he had once held. He won and was re-elected six additional times. He rose to the position of Chair of the House Democratic Caucus, which he held from 1981 to 1984. Long generally held political positions more liberal than that of most White Southern Democrats. During the 1984 presidential primaries, Long endorsed former vice president Walter Mondale.

On January 20, 1985, Long died from heart failure in Washington, D.C., and a moment of silence was given for him at Ronald Reagan's second presidential inauguration. His wife Cathy won the special election to succeed him and served one term. In 1994 he was inducted into the Louisiana Political Museum and Hall of Fame.

== See also ==
- List of members of the United States Congress who died in office (1950–1999)

U.S. House of Representatives
Preceded by Harold B. McSween	Member of the U.S. House of Representatives from Louisiana's 8th congressional district 1963–1965	Succeeded by Speedy Long
Preceded by Speedy Long	Member of the U.S. House of Representatives from Louisiana's 8th congressional district 1973–1985	Succeeded by Catherine Small Long
Party political offices
Preceded by Tom Foley	Chair of the House Democratic Caucus; 1981–1985	Succeeded by Dick Gephardt
New office	Chair of the House Democratic Party Effectiveness Committee; 1981–1984	Position abolished
