= Louisiana's 31st State Senate district =

American legislative district

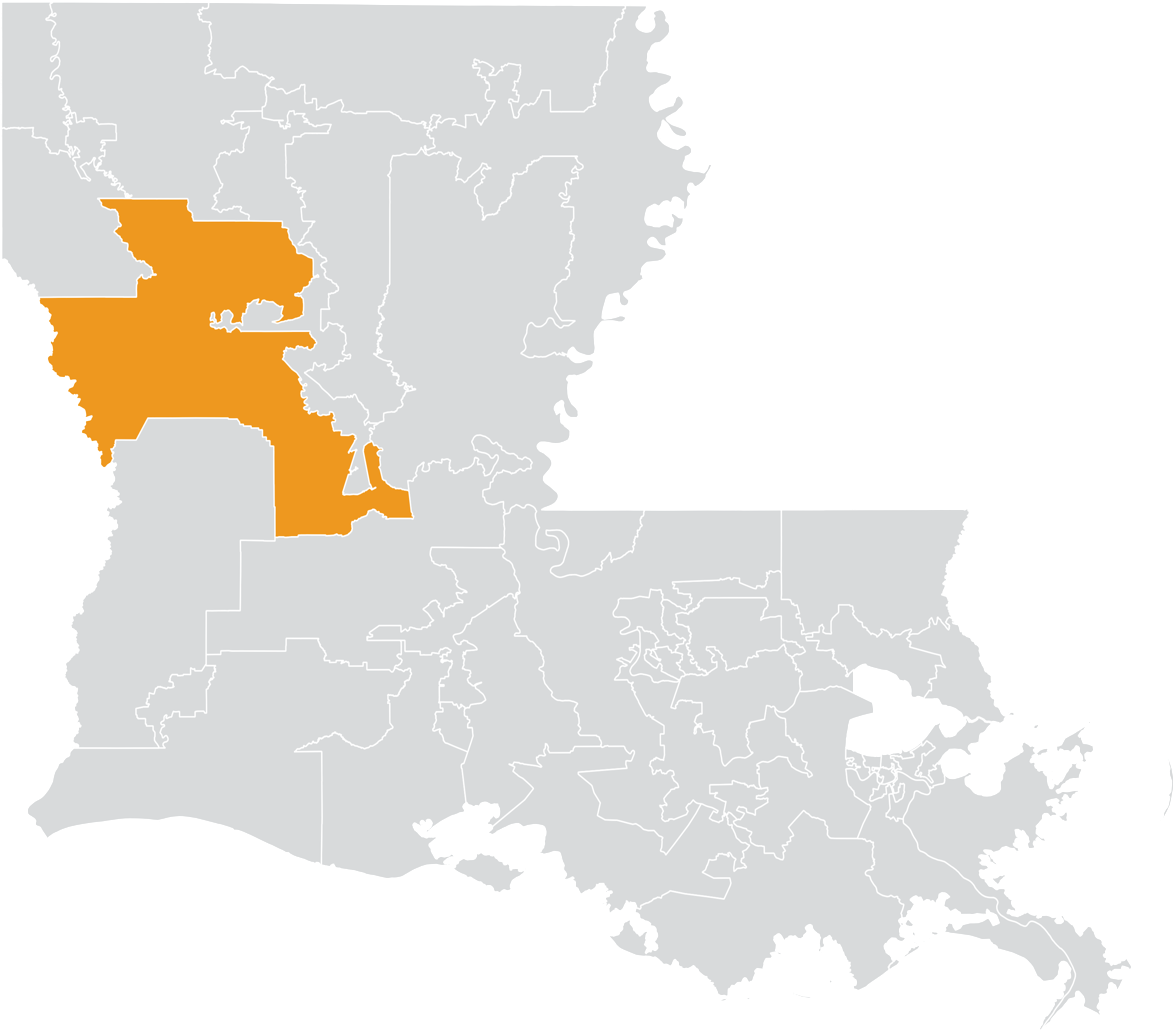
Senator
Louie Bernard; R–Natchitoches
- Registration: 38.0% Democratic; 37.2% Republican; 24.8% No party preference
- Demographics: 68% White; 21% Black; 4% Hispanic; 1% Asian; 2% Native American; 3% Other
- Population (2019): 111,257
- Registered voters: 70,454

Louisiana's 31st State Senate district is one of 39 districts in the Louisiana State Senate. It has been represented by Republican Louie Bernard since 2020, succeeding term-limited fellow Republican Gerald Long.

== Geography ==
District 31 covers the Central Louisiana parishes of Red River and Sabine as well as parts of Grant, Natchitoches, Rapides, and Winn Parishes, including some or all of Alexandria, Natchitoches, Many, Winnfield, and Coushatta.

The district is split between Louisiana's 4th and 5th congressional districts, and overlaps with the 7th, 13th, 22nd, 23rd, 24th, 25th, 26th, and 27th districts of the Louisiana House of Representatives.

== Recent election results ==
Louisiana uses a jungle primary system. If no candidate receives 50% in the first round of voting, when all candidates appear on the same ballot regardless of party, the top-two finishers advance to a runoff election.

=== 2019 ===
2019 Louisiana State Senate election, District 31
Party	Candidate	Votes	%
Republican	Louie Bernard	18,529	55.3
Republican	Trey Flynn	8,596	25.7
Republican	Douglas Brown	6,381	19.0
Total votes		33,506	100
Republican hold			

=== 2015 ===
2015 Louisiana State Senate election, District 31
Party	Candidate	Votes	%
Republican	Gerald Long (incumbent)	Unopposed	100
Total votes		Unopposed	100
Republican hold			

=== 2011 ===
2011 Louisiana State Senate election, District 31
Party	Candidate	Votes	%
Republican	Gerald Long (incumbent)	Unopposed	100
Total votes		Unopposed	100
Republican hold			

=== Federal and statewide results ===
Year	Office	Results
2020	President	Trump 75.2–23.4%
2019	Governor (runoff)	Rispone 66.8–33.2%
2016	President	Trump 73.1–24.2%
2015	Governor (runoff)	Vitter 56.4–43.6%
2014	Senate (runoff)	Cassidy 71.8–28.2%
2012	President	Romney 71.5–26.9%
