= Northwestern State University of Louisiana =

Public university in Natchitoches, Louisiana, US

- Former names: Louisiana State Normal School (1884–1944); Northwestern State College of Louisiana (1944–1970)
- Motto: Dedicated to one goal. Yours.
- Type: Public university
- Established: 1884; 142 years ago
- Parent institution: UL System
- Academic affiliations: Space-grant
- President: James T. Genovese
- Students: 6,342 (fall 2025)
- Undergraduates: 5,441 (fall 2025)
- Postgraduates: 901 (fall 2025)
- Location: Natchitoches, Louisiana, United States; 31°45′00″N 93°05′50″W
- Campus: Rural, 916 acres (371 ha)
- Colors: Purple and White; Orange accent
- Nickname: Demons / Lady Demons
- Sporting affiliations: NCAA Division I FCS – Southland
- Mascot: Vic the Demon
- Website: www.nsula.edu

The Northwestern State University of Louisiana (NSULA) is a public university primarily situated in Natchitoches, Louisiana, with a nursing campus in Shreveport and general campuses in Leesville/Fort Johnson and Alexandria. It is a part of the University of Louisiana System.

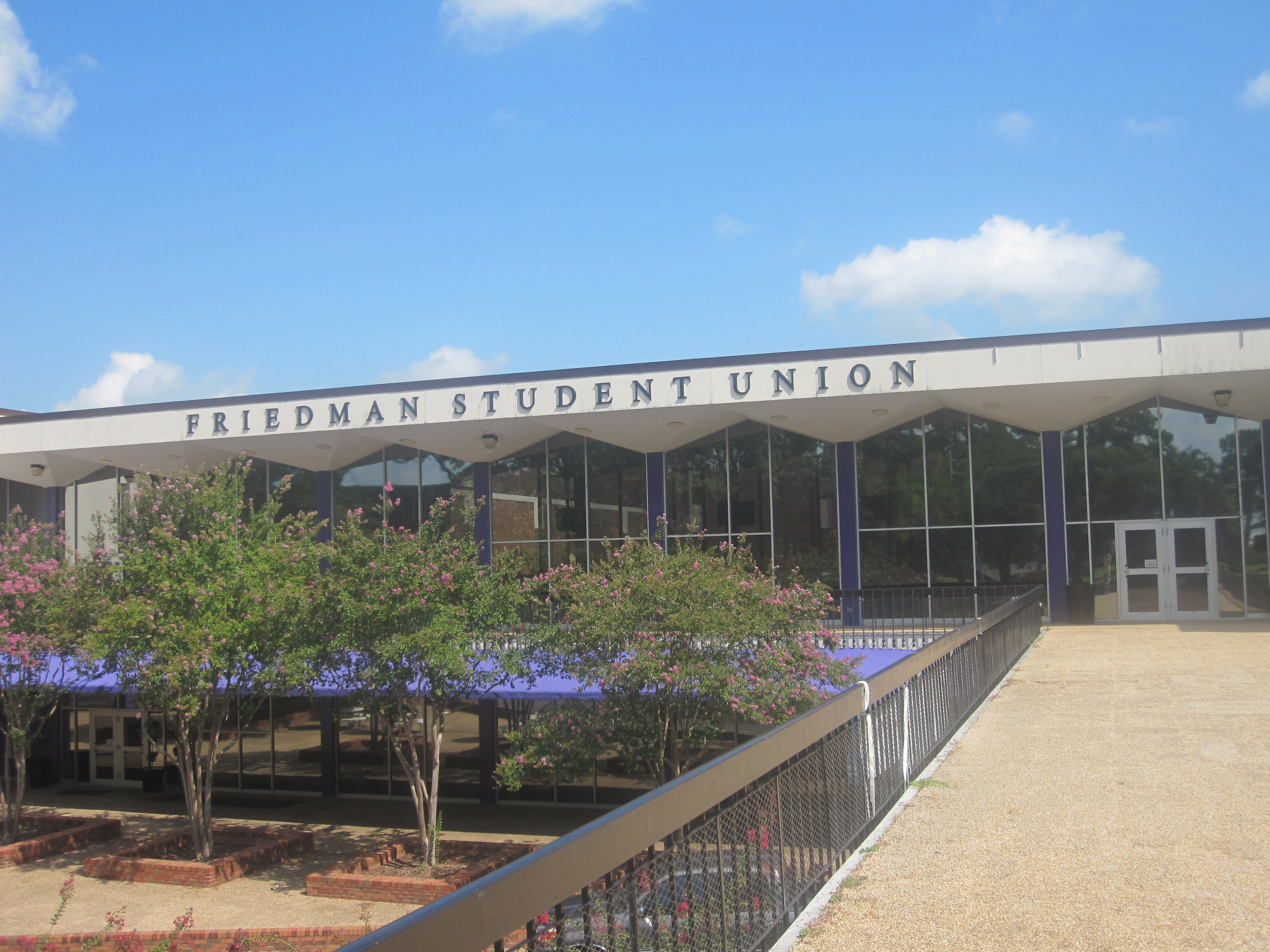
The Friedman Student Union Building is named for the late Louisiana State Senator Sylvan Friedman of Natchitoches.

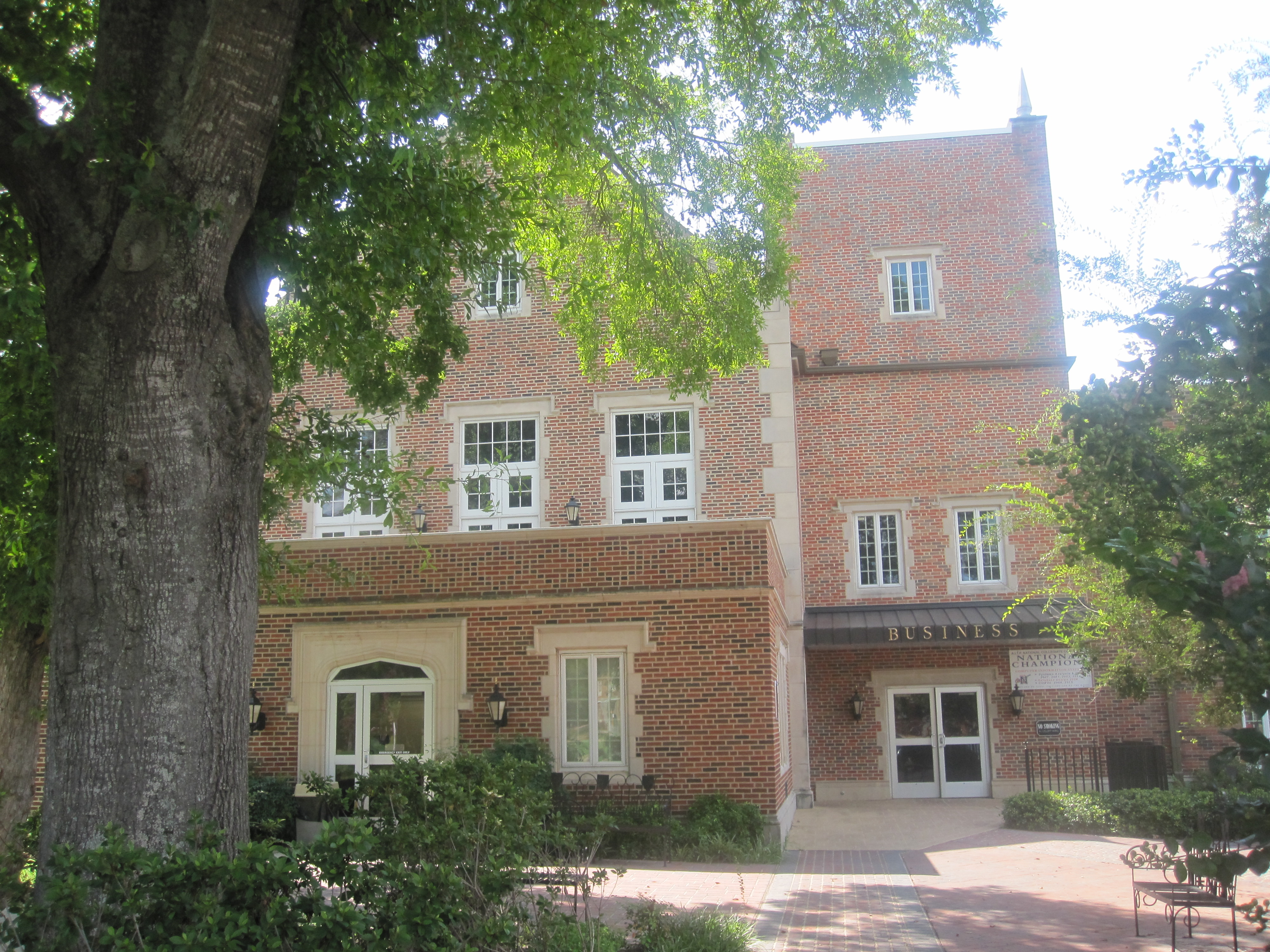
The NSU Business Building

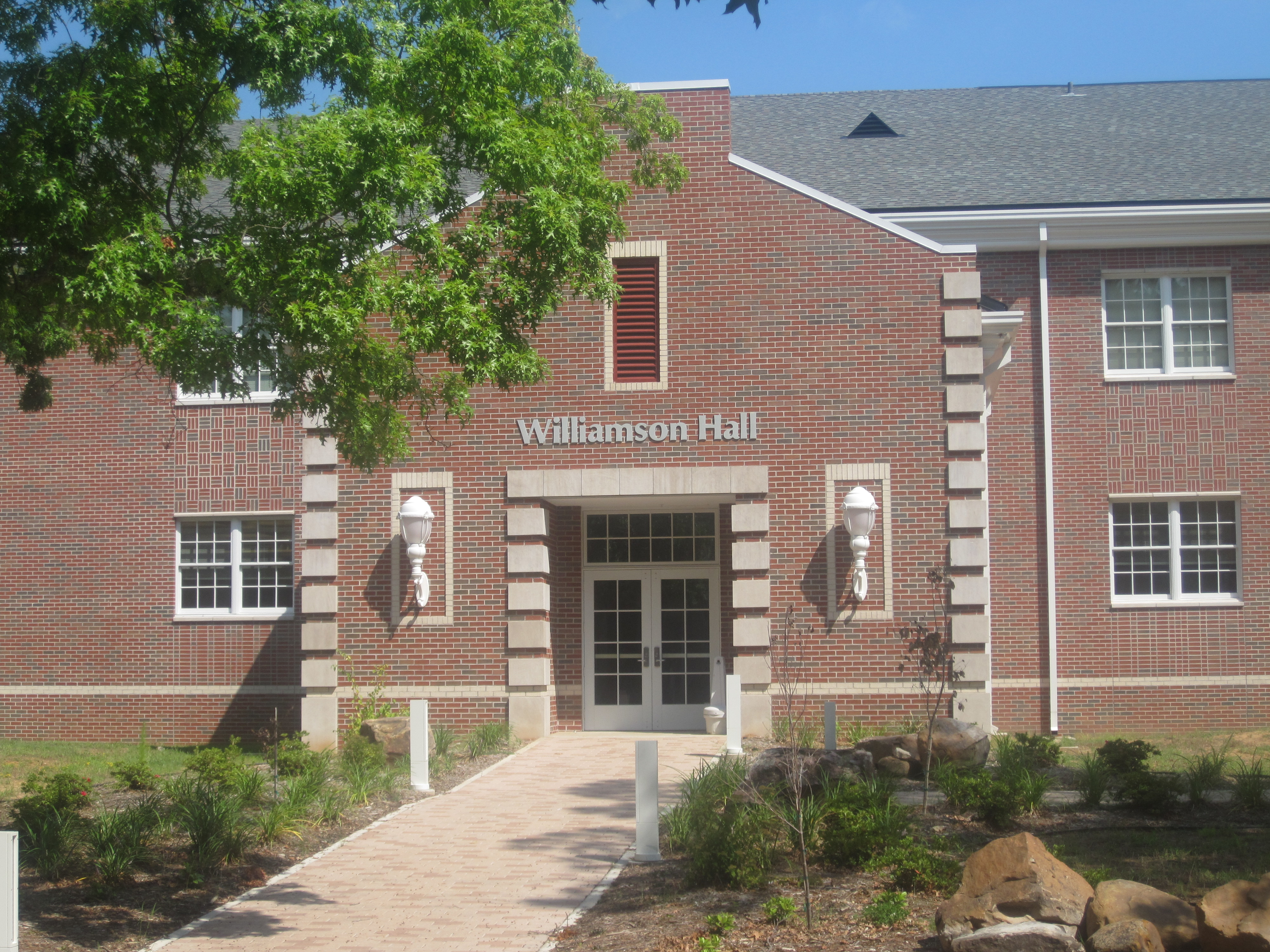
Williamson Hall houses the NSU engineering program.

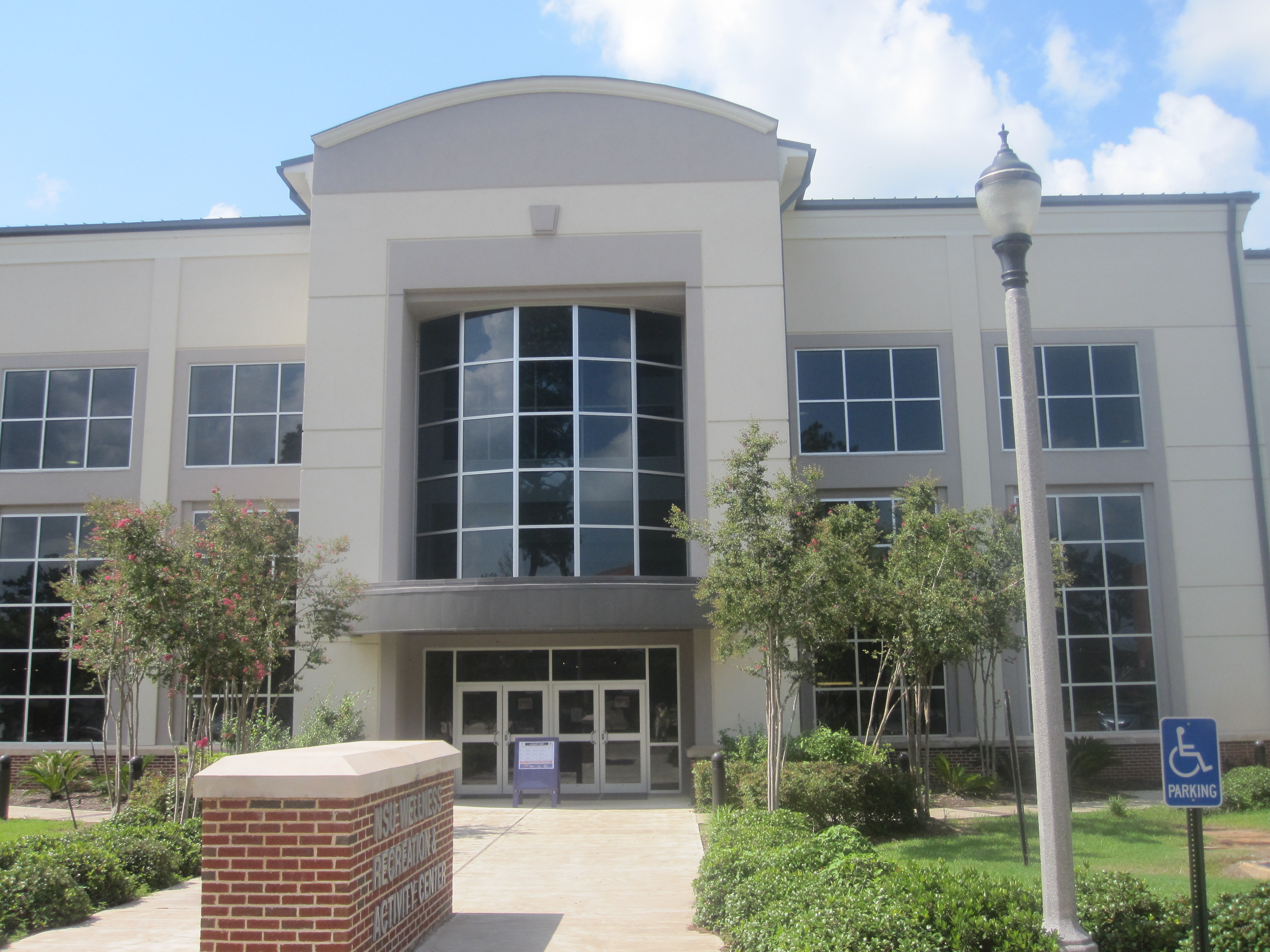
NSU Wellness Recreation and Activity Center

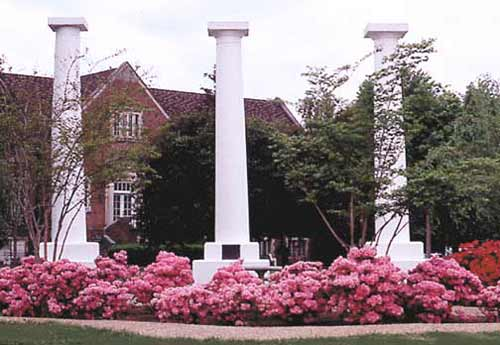
The three columns of Northwestern State University

NSU was founded in 1884 as the Louisiana State Normal School. It was the first school in Louisiana to offer degree programs in nursing and business education. NSU, along with numerous other state colleges, gained university status in 1970 during the administration of President Arnold R. Kilpatrick, a Northwestern State alumnus who served from 1966 to 1978. Kilpatrick succeeded the 12-year president, John S. Kyser, a native of El Paso, Illinois.

NSU was one of the first six colleges to enter into NASA's Joint Venture Program. Students worked with NASA scientists to help analyze data and do research for the 1996 Space Shuttle Columbia shuttle mission. NSU also hosts the Louisiana Scholars' College, Louisiana's designated honors college in the liberal arts and sciences. The Louisiana School for Math, Science, and the Arts, a state-supported residential high school for sophomores, juniors, and seniors, is also located on the campus. It was a brainchild of former State Representative Jimmy D. Long of Natchitoches, who also attended NSU.

NSU offers more than 50 degree programs. Fall 2018 total enrollment was 11,081, the largest in the university's 133-year history, although the school saw enrollments decline during the COVID-19 pandemic, which hampered recruitment efforts. NSU also claims more than 70,000 alumni.

== History ==
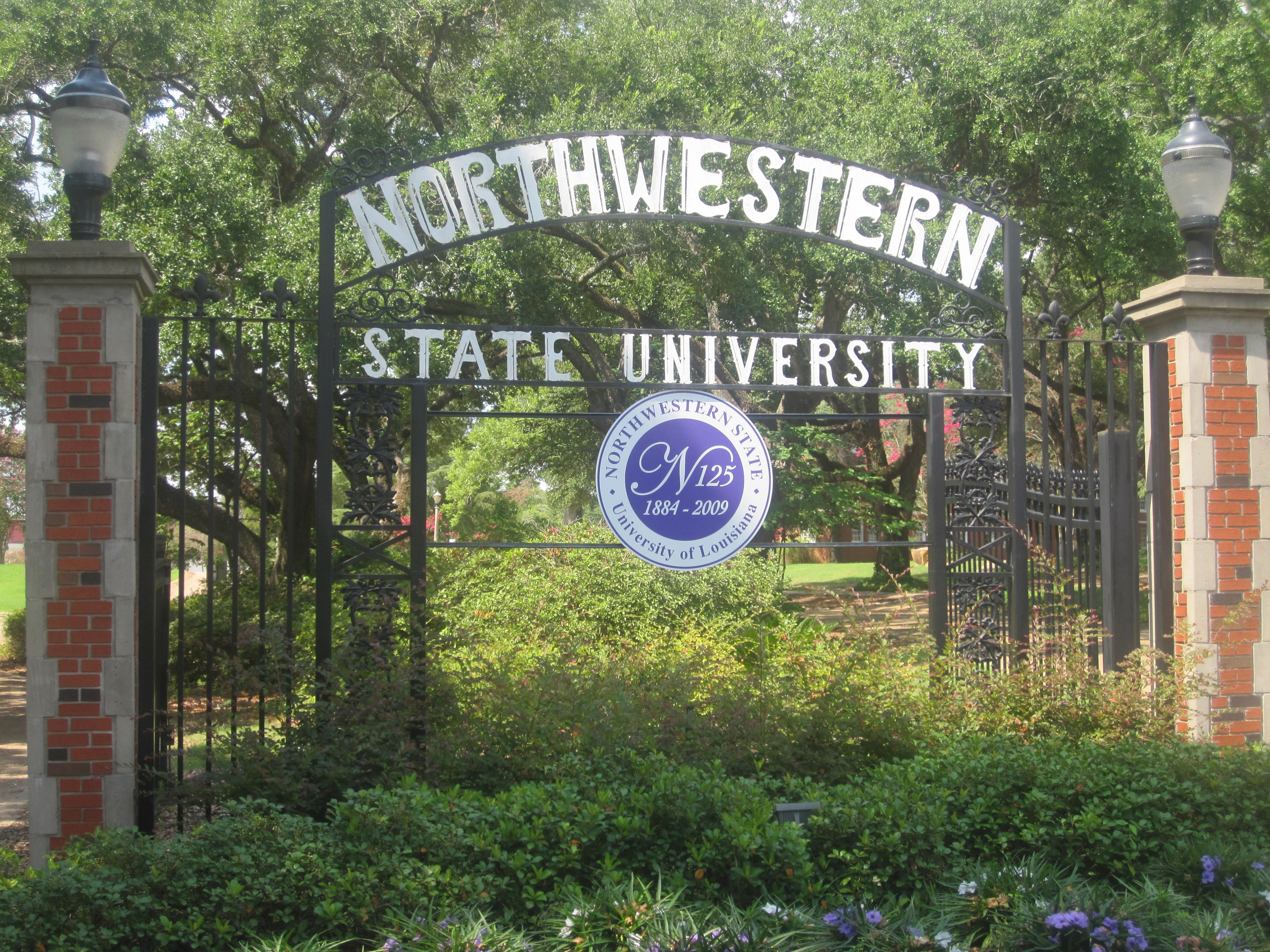
Main entrance to Northwestern State University in Natchitoches, Louisiana

Northwestern State University stands on ground that has been dedicated to learning for well over 100 years. Before the American Civil War, a portion of the present campus was the property of the Bullard family of Natchitoches. As early as 1856, the Bullard mansion was in use as a convent by the Religious Society of the Sacred Heart. The following year, a school building was erected at the convent, and in 1884, the town and parish of Natchitoches purchased the property. Three of the four great white columns that once supported the east gable of the mansion still stand on "The Hill" and serve as the unofficial symbols of the university.

In 1884, the Louisiana State Legislature by Act 51 created the Louisiana State Normal School for the preparation of teachers. Shortly thereafter, a freshman member of the Louisiana House of Representatives, Leopold Caspari of Natchitoches, offered the convent site as a campus for the school with the anticipated approval of the citizens of Natchitoches. The offer was accepted, and from 1885 to 1918, the school offered two years of study for the training of teachers. Baccalaureate programs were inaugurated, and the Louisiana Constitution of 1921 changed the name of the school to Louisiana State Normal College. In 1944, the institution's excellent service in its broader role was accorded formal recognition by Act 326 of the Legislature, which changed its name to Northwestern State College of Louisiana.

Northwestern State maintained and strengthened its tradition of leadership in public service and academic endeavor and became, in 1954, the first college under the jurisdiction of the Louisiana State Board of Education to offer a master's degree. The Specialist in Education degree was first offered in 1966 and the Doctor of Philosophy in Education degrees were authorized in 1967. On June 18, 1970, Governor John J. McKeithen signed a legislative act that brought the old campus its greatest distinction, changing its title to Northwestern State University of Louisiana. In 1980, the old campus quadrangle where the columns stand was entered into the National Register of Historic Places under the title "Normal Hill Historic District."

Although primarily a regional institution, Northwestern State also offers an opportunity for education at satellite locations, including Leesville, Shreveport, and Alexandria. The Nursing Education Center, located in Shreveport, provides the educational environment for nursing majors enrolled in clinical courses, as well as general education courses.

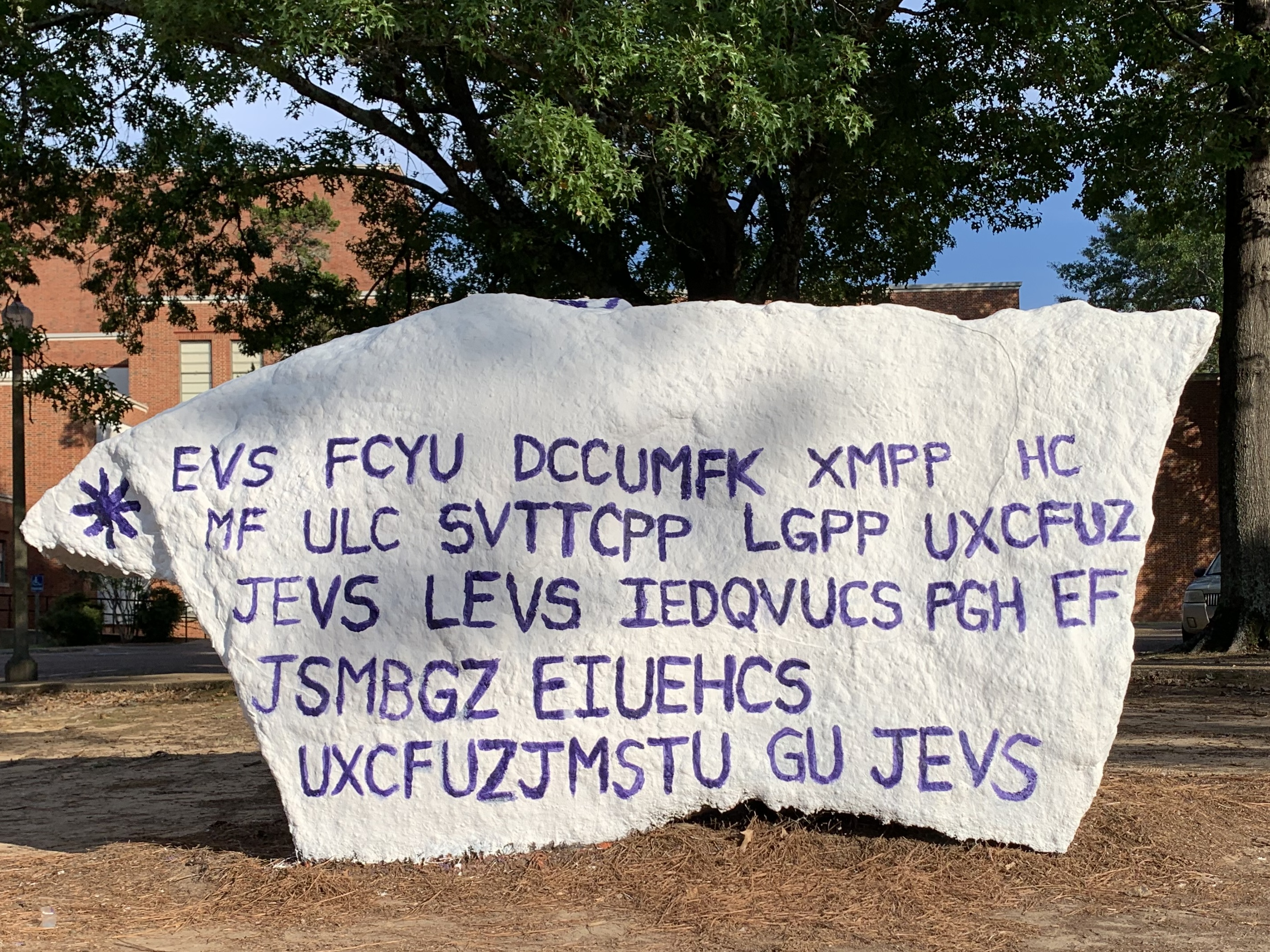
"The Rock" on Sam Sibley Dr. featuring a Caesar Cipher promoting the Demon Cipher Society in September 2022

A large piece of limestone, known as "The Rock" was placed on campus in 2006 at a major intersection for registered student organizations to paint designs promoting their groups. The list of student organizations available grows every semester.

In 2012, the university, along with Southeastern Louisiana University and Louisiana State University was censured by the American Association of University Professors for violations of AAUP standards on faculty rights. In response, Randy Moffett, then University of Louisiana System president, said that “placing universities on a censure list has little, if any, practical implication."

In 2021, Marcus Jones became the first African-American President in the university's 137-year history after he was unanimously approved by the Louisiana Board of Supervisors. Four years later, in 2024, he was succeeded by Louisiana Supreme Court Associate Justice James Genovese.

=== Vic the Demon ===
On November 8, 1922, by proclamation of President V. L. Roy and Coach H. Lee Prather, all athletic teams became known as the Demons. The name was decided upon by a contest open to all students, with a grand prize of $10. A committee was appointed by the president to narrow down the names submitted by the student body. The final selection was decided by a vote of the students. The two most popular choices were Braves and Demons. Among other names submitted by students were Sharks, Daredevils, Musketeers, Pelicans, Prather's Ground Hogs, Bloodhounds, Cyclops, and Serpents. The official winners were Aileen Ritter and Truett Scarborough.

On September 22, 1984, the Demon received his official given name using another contest sponsored by the athletic department. The contest was open to faculty, staff, and students. The objective was to find a name for the Demon. Over 300 entries were submitted to the committee. The grand prize was an all-expenses-paid weekend at the Louisiana State Fair Classic. Ray Carney, an alumnus of the university, was the official winner with "Vic", which is short for "Victory".

=== Jim Croce ===
Singer-songwriter Jim Croce died in a plane crash hours after finishing a 1973 concert on the NSU campus.

== Student media ==
Undergraduate demographics as of Fall 2023
Race and ethnicity	Total
American Indian/Alaska Native	1%
White	54%
Black	30%
Hispanic	6%
Two or more races	5%
International student	2%
Unknown	2%
Asian	1%
Economic diversity
Low-income (Note: The percentage of students who received an income-based federal Pell grant intended for low-income students.)	47%
Affluent (Note: The percentage of students who are a part of the American middle class at the bare minimum.)	53%

=== Newspaper and yearbook ===
Northwestern's online news source with occasional printed special editions, The Current Sauce, was founded in 1914. In 2021, the newspaper and campus radio station, KNWD, merged their news operations into a shared digital platform, "Purple Media Network." Its annual student-run yearbook is called The Potpourri.

=== Radio and television ===
The student-run radio station is The Demon (KNWD 91.7 FM) and a faculty-administered and student-operated local television station is NSU22, on which can be found biweekly student-produced newscasts.

=== Literary magazine ===
NSU's literary magazine is called The Argus. It is student-run and published during the spring semester. The magazine content is provided by competitions in various fields of writing and artwork.

== Music ==
The Spirit of Northwestern marching band features over 300 members each year, with membership open to any major and classification of student. Their uniforms are purple and white with a thin orange stripe. Other bands at Northwestern are the Pep Band, Symphonic Band, Wind Symphony, Wind Ensemble, Jazz Ensemble, numerous chamber groups, and the Natchitoches-Northwestern Symphony Orchestra.

== Athletics ==
The Northwestern State athletic teams go by the Demons, with women's athletic teams generally called the Lady Demons, and its mascot is Vic the Demon. The university is a member of the National Collegiate Athletic Association (NCAA) and competes in the Southland Conference at the NCAA Division I level. Northwestern State sponsors 12 varsity athletic teams, five men's teams and seven women's teams. The official list of sports changes by semester as new groups are approved.

== Archive ==
NSU maintains an archive through the Cammie G. Henry Research Center. Collections cover a diversity of individuals and topics. Materials may be accessed on such figures as Ethma Odum, the pioneering woman television personality at KALB-TV in Alexandria; James B. Aswell, Kate Chopin, Robert DeBlieux, Caroline Dormon, and the Cane River.

== Notable faculty and administrators ==
- James B. Aswell, president of NSU and U.S. representative for Louisiana's 8th congressional district
- Medford Bryan Evans, english professor and conservative activist
- Mike Johnson, professor of law & Speaker of the United States House of Representatives
- Julie Kane, poet
- Ralph L. Ropp, professor of speech and head of the forensics department, president of Louisiana Tech
