= 1930 New Orleans mayoral election =

The New Orleans mayoral election of 1930, held in January of that year, resulted in the election of T. Semmes Walmsley to his first full term as Mayor of New Orleans.

T. Semmes Walmsley had been acting mayor since the resignation of the previous mayor, Arthur J. O'Keefe, due to illness in July 1929. Leader of the Regular Democratic Organization, Walmsley was the chosen candidate of that powerful political machine.

Public Service Commissioner Francis Williams, once an ally of Governor Huey Long but by 1930 his enemy, ran against Walmsley. Against the advice of advisors like Robert Maestri, Long remained neutral in the first primary, declaring that neither candidate was worth supporting.

The first primary was a close race; Walmsley came first by only 9,000 votes. Williams was entitled to face Walmsley in the runoff, but he rejected Long's last-minute offer of support and withdrew from the race.

== Sources ==
- Boulard, Garry (1998). Huey Long Invades New Orleans: The Siege of a City, 1934-36. Gretna, Louisiana: Pelican Publishing Company. ISBN 1-56554-303-3. OCLC 39464729.
- Hair, William Ivy (1996). The kingfish and his realm: the life and times of Huey P. Long. Baton Rouge, Louisiana: Louisiana State University Press. ISBN 0-8071-2124-X. OCLC 36205850.
- Williams, Thomas Harry (1985) [1969]. Huey Long. New York City: Alfred A. Knopf. ISBN 0-394-42954-0. OCLC 20058444.
