= Andrew J. McShane =

American politician

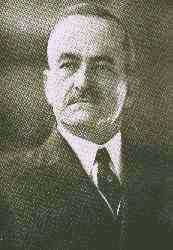
Andrew J. McShane

Andrew James McShane (January 2, 1865 – April 17, 1936) was mayor of New Orleans from 1920 to 1925.

McShane was born in New Orleans, the son of two Irish-American Catholics, Bernard McShane and Rose (Fitzpatrick) McShane. After his father died, he entered the hide business at the age of nine, working his way through the ranks as a travelling salesman before becoming the sole owner of his firm at the age of twenty-one. His business was very successful. He married Agnes Bruns of New Orleans in 1918; they had one daughter, Rosemary.

McShane was involved in New Orleans politics throughout his adult life. He was associated with the reform-oriented groups that were opposed to the machine politics of the Regular Democratic Organization, or Old Regulars. He held posts in the administrations of reform mayors Walter Flower and Paul Capdevielle. McShane ran for a city council seat in 1912 under a 'good government' platform, but lost.

In the election of 1920, McShane was the mayoral nominee of the reform-oriented Orleans Democratic Organization. The endorsement of reform governor John M. Parker helped him narrowly defeat the incumbent Old Regular mayor, Martin Behrman.

Despite the reform promises of the new administration, McShane was able to achieve very little. He and his administration were hampered by inexperience in city government and by dissension between various factions of his supporters. He was able to improve garbage collection, reform the Department of Public Works and the city's finances, and create a system of one-way streets to improve traffic flow.

McShane ran for re-election in 1925, but was soundly defeated by former mayor Martin Behrman. After his defeat, the Old Regulars would continue to control the city until 1946.

McShane Place, a block-long street connecting Rampart Street and St. Claude Avenue, was formerly named after him.

== Sources ==
- Biographical Dictionary of American Mayors, 1820-1980. Greenwood Press, 1981.
- New Orleans Public Library, Louisiana Division. "Administration of Andrew J. McShane."
- Administrations of the Mayor's of New Orleans: McShane at nutrias.org

| Preceded by Martin Behrman | Mayor of New Orleans; 1920–1925 | Succeeded by Martin Behrman |
