= Jesse S. Cave =

American politician (1872-1948)

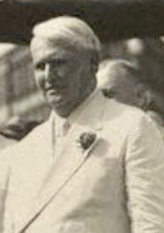

Treasurer of Louisiana
- In office 1932–1936
- Governor: Oscar K. Allen
- Succeeded by: A. P. Tugwell

Commissioner of Public Finance of New Orleans
- In office 1936–1946

52nd Mayor (acting mayor) of New Orleans, Louisiana
- In office July 15th, 1936 – August 17th, 1936
- Preceded by: Fred A. Earhart (Acting Mayor)
- Succeeded by: Robert Maestri

Personal details
- Born: 1872 Van Alstyne, Texas, US
- Died: 1948 (aged 75–76)

Jesse S. Cave (1872–1948) was an American business executive and politician.

Cave was born in Van Alstyne, Texas. He was briefly acting mayor of New Orleans from July 15 to August 17, 1936. Cave arrived in New Orleans in 1904 as a manager of an iron cistern company, and was elected president of the New Orleans Board of Trade in 1930. In 1932 he was elected Louisiana State Treasurer. Along with A. Miles Pratt and Fred A. Earhart, Cave was one of three acting mayors who served in the summer of 1936 between the resignation of Mayor T. Semmes Walmsley and the accession of Robert Maestri.

After his tenure as acting mayor, Cave was elected Commissioner of Public Finance under the commission council government of the Maestri administration where he served from 1936 to 1946.

== Sources ==
- Choctaw Club of New Orleans. Truth Achievements of the Mayor Robert S. Maestri Administration. Franklin Printing Co., 1943.

Preceded by Fred A. Earhart as acting mayor	Mayor of New Orleans; 1936	Succeeded by Robert Maestri

Party political offices
Preceded by	Treasurer of Louisiana; 1932 - 1936	Succeeded by A. P. Tugwell
