= Fred A. Earhart =

American politician (1875–1948)

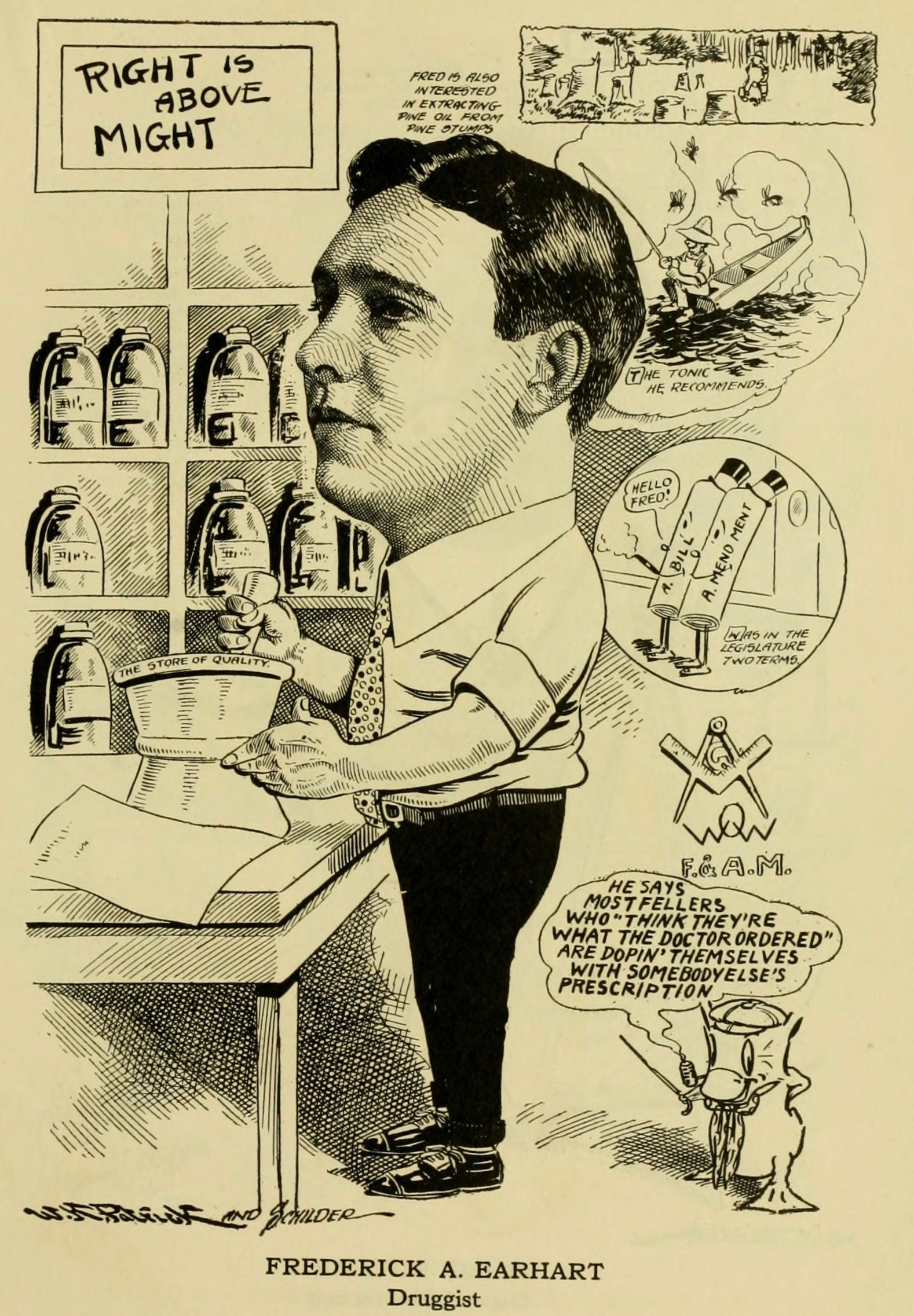
- Cartoon of druggist Frederick A. Earhart, c. 1917

51st Mayor (acting) of New Orleans, Louisiana
- In office July 15, 1936 – July 15, 1936
- Preceded by: A. Miles Pratt (acting)
- Succeeded by: Jesse S. Cave (acting)

Personal details
- Born: Frederick Adam Earhart; July 29, 1875
- Died: November 2, 1948 (aged 73) New Orleans, Louisiana, US
- Resting place: Metairie Cemetery
- Party: Democratic
- Spouse: Ida Hailes
- Children: Frederick "Ted", Valentine "Valley", Sarah Lydia, Ida, Lillian "Lily", Robert Hailes, James "Jimmy"
- Profession: Politician, Pharmacist

Frederick Adam Earhart (July 29, 1875 – November 2, 1948) was acting mayor of New Orleans for one day on July 15, 1936.

A pharmacist, Earhart was the Twelfth Ward leader of the Regular Democratic Organization political machine. He was an Old Regular state senator for the Twelfth Ward from 1912 into the 1920s. He was elected to New Orleans' commission council in 1930, where he served as Commissioner of Public Utilities. Along with A. Miles Pratt and Jesse S. Cave.

Earhart was one of three acting mayors who served in the summer of 1936 between the resignation of T. Semmes Walmsley and the accession of Robert Maestri. After his brief tenure as acting mayor, Earhart continued to serve as Commissioner of Public Utilities in the Maestri administration.

Earhart owned and founded the first drugstore chain in New Orleans. The Earhart Expressway in Jefferson Parish and Earhart Boulevard in New Orleans are named after him.

== Sources ==
- Choctaw Club of New Orleans. Truth Achievements of the Mayor Robert S. Maestri Administration. Franklin Printing Co., 1943.
- Gill, Donald A. Stories Behind New Orleans Street Names. Bonus Books, 1992.
- Mention of Fred A. Earhart's death

Preceded by A. Miles Pratt (acting mayor)	Mayor of New Orleans; July 15, 1936	Succeeded by Jesse S. Cave (acting mayor)
