= Albert Pratt =

Albert Pratt may refer to:

- Albert Pratt (cricketer) (1893–1916), New Zealand cricketer
- Albert F. Pratt (1872–1928), American lawyer and politician, Attorneys General of Minnesota
- Al Pratt (baseball) (1847–1937), American baseball player and manager
- A. Miles Pratt (1885–1969), American politician, acting mayor of New Orleans
