= Michael O'Keefe (American politician) =

American politician (1931–2021)

Member of the Louisiana State Senate for Orleans Parish
- In office 1960–1983
- Succeeded by: Ben Bagert

President of the Louisiana State Senate
- In office 1976–1983
- Preceded by: James E. Fitzmorris (ex officio as Lieutenant Governor)
- Succeeded by: Samuel B. Nunez Jr.

Personal details
- Born: Michael Hanley O'Keefe; December 1, 1931 New Orleans
- Died: January 31, 2021 (aged 89) New Orleans
- Party: Democratic
- Spouse: Jean V. O'Keefe
- Relations: Arthur J. O'Keefe (grandfather); Sean O'Keefe (nephew)
- Education: Loyola University New Orleans College of Law
- Occupation: lawyer

Michael Hanley O'Keefe Sr. (December 1, 1931 – January 31, 2021) was an American lawyer who served in the Louisiana State Senate for Orleans Parish from 1960 to 1983. He was later convicted of various crimes, and spent several years in prison.

== Background ==
Reared in a Catholic family of Irish descent, O'Keefe is the grandson of Mayor Arthur J. O'Keefe Sr., of New Orleans, a businessman who served from 1926 to 1929, upon the death of Mayor Martin Behrman. O'Keefe's middle name is derived from his paternal great-grandmother, Sarah Hanley. His parents were Arthur Jr. (born 1901) and Eleonora O'Keefe. His father was a lawyer and a state senator from New Orleans for an abbreviated term from 1948 to 1950. The O'Keefes lived at 1204 St. Andrew Street in New Orleans. His older siblings include Arthur III (c. 1925–1996), an interior designer, Patrick Gordon O'Keefe (born c. 1927), a U.S. Navy submarine engineer, and Eleonora M. O'Keefe Ibert (born c. 1929), later of Fredericksburg, Virginia. In 1955, O'Keefe obtained his Juris Doctor degree from Loyola University in New Orleans.

O'Keefe was among the Louisiana delegation to the 1968 Democratic National Convention in Chicago, which was headed by Governor John McKeithen. Many of the biggest political names in the state party attended the convention, which nominated Vice President Hubert H. Humphrey to carry the banner against Richard M. Nixon, with a third choice, George Wallace, former governor of Alabama running as the American Independent Party nominee.

== Criminal activities ==
=== Mail fraud and obstruction ===
In February 1983, O'Keefe was convicted of mail fraud and two counts of obstruction of justice in connection with his actions as a general partner in a New Orleans real estate concern. Forced from office, he was at the time the Senate President and was succeeded by Samuel B. Nunez, Jr., of Chalmette in St. Bernard Parish. O'Keefe was the first Senate president elected by his colleagues; prior to the Louisiana Constitution of 1974, the Senate President had automatically been the lieutenant governor, as it still is in most states.

As a result of the 1983 convictions, O'Keefe served 18 months in prison and a halfway house. The court determined that O'Keefe cheated business partners out of $900,000, used forged evidence, and implored a witness to lie about the matter.

Even after his conviction, O'Keefe ran for re-election to a seventh term in the state Senate, but was handily defeated in the October 22, 1983 jungle primary by four-term state representative Ben Bagert, who made O'Keefe's record a key campaign issue.

=== Insurance liquidation ===
In a separate case in 1984, O'Keefe pleaded no contest in what prosecutors said was a scheme to obtain illegally $6 million in loans. In 1986, then-Governor Edwin Edwards, one of O'Keefe's closest political allies, pardoned O'Keefe so that he could seek to regain his legal license.

=== Disbarment ===
On December 7, 1984, the Louisiana Supreme Court had disbarred O'Keefe, retroactive to December 22, 1983. On April 7, 1989, the court granted O'Keefe's application for readmission to the bar. During the early 1990s, his O'Keefe, O'Keefe, & Bernstein law firm lost most of its business from the insurance industry and the New Orleans Housing Authority. O'Keefe became involved in a personal-injury practice in which he paid others to bring him clients, a violation of the judicial canon of ethics. In most of these cases, the clients never spoke to an attorney; they were referred to a physician selected by O'Keefe. As a result of these activities, O'Keefe was permanently disbarred.

=== Insurance theft ===
In 1999, O'Keefe was sentenced to 19.5 years in prison - his third conviction since 1983 - for stealing from a failed medical malpractice insurance company, an action which left hundreds of physicians without coverage. O'Keefe said that he and his co-defendants would attempt to pay $4.7 million in restitution by taking money from the liquidation of another company involved in the case. O'Keefe's share of the theft was set at $1.2 million owed to the Physicians National Risk Retention Group. From his prison cell, O'Keefe asked a U.S. district judge to halt the garnishment of his state pension for the repayment. O'Keefe co-defendants included his son-in-law, Eric Edwin Schmidt (born c. 1960), and businessman John O'Brien, both of New Orleans, and a third businessman, Gary Bennett of Cincinnati, Ohio. All were convicted in March 1996 of conspiracy, money laundering and mail and wire fraud. Their prison terms began in April 1999. Schmidt and O'Brien each received sentences of ten years and one month; Bennett, eight years. O'Keefe got the stiffest sentence because he had pleaded no contest in the case, and it was his third federal conviction.

=== Columbus University diploma mill ===
While behind bars in the Federal Correctional Institution in Butner, North Carolina, O'Keefe became involved with a diploma mill operated via the Internet. This "Columbus University" was based in a duplex in the 8200 block of Hickory Street in New Orleans. The phantom school offered for approximately $3,000 to $4,000 diplomas, law degrees and even doctorates though according to agents of the Federal Bureau of Investigation the "university" had only one professor, a Dr. Mary Martin, who was also the registrar. The degrees were worthless because the institution was unaccredited in the Gulf states from which it claimed to have operating licenses.

At some point, O'Keefe was transferred from Butner to the minimum-security prison in Beaumont, Texas, much closer to New Orleans. O'Keefe was scheduled for release on April 29, 2016, three years earlier than called for in the original sentence.

== Legacy ==
Journalist and political analyst Clancy DuBois noted how much faith the people of New Orleans had once placed in the senior O'Keefe: "His downfall was one of the most spectacular, in the sense of how big it was, how powerful he was, and how far he fell, in my lifetime." DuBois said that O'Keefe was once known as "the snowman." [It was] said he could walk across a field of snow and not leave tracks. Well, that was in the 1970s and 1980s. Nowadays, with technology and the federal government having all of its vast powers, it's very hard to weave webs that can't be seen."

In 2009 his son, Michael O'Keefe Jr. (born c. 1959), then the president of Citywide Mortgage Company of New Orleans, pleaded guilty in U.S. District Court before Judge Ivan L.R. Lemelle to making false statements during a transaction with the United States Department of Housing and Urban Development. The real estate scam involved fraudulent appraisals, credit documents, loan applications, and straw buyers. O'Keefe was ordered to pay nearly $700,000 in restitution. For his leadership role in the scam, O'Keefe received an 18-month sentence at the Butner prison. From the duplex on Hickory Street, FBI agents seized computers and hard drives, bank/payroll records, and boxes of documents which linked to the business dealings of the junior O'Keefe. He was released from prison on May 24, 2011.

O'Keefe's nephew, the son of his brother Patrick and Patrick's wife, the late Patricia Carlin, is Sean O'Keefe, the former chancellor of the Louisiana State University and a NASA administrator under U.S. President George W. Bush.

He died of melanoma on January 31, 2021, at his home in Lakeview, New Orleans, at age 89.

Louisiana State Senate
Preceded by Jimmy Fitzmorris	President of the Louisiana State Senate; 1976–1983	Succeeded by Samuel B. Nunez Jr.
