= A. Miles Pratt =

American politician

Acting Mayor of New Orleans, Louisiana
- In office June 30, 1936 – July 15, 1936
- Preceded by: T. Semmes Walmsley
- Succeeded by: Fred A. Earhart (acting)

Personal details
- Born: January 4, 1885
- Died: June 11, 1969 (aged 84) New Orleans, Louisiana

Albert Miles Pratt (January 4, 1885 – June 11, 1969) was briefly acting mayor of New Orleans, Louisiana, USA, from June 30 to July 15, 1936. He was New Orleans's Commissioner of Public Finance for two terms in the 1920s and 1930s. In 1936 he was appointed collector of customs for the Port of New Orleans. Along with Fred A. Earhart and Jesse S. Cave, Pratt was one of three acting mayors who served in the summer of 1936 between the resignation of Mayor T. Semmes Walmsley and the accession of Robert Maestri. He died in 1969.

== Sources ==
- Gill, Donald A. Stories Behind New Orleans Street Names. Bonus Books, 1992.

Preceded by T. Semmes Walmsley	Mayor of New Orleans; 1936	Succeeded by Fred A. Earhart
