= Fullerton, Louisiana =

- Fullerton Mill and Town
- U.S. National Register of Historic Places
- Location within Louisiana Location within the United States
- Location: Louisiana Highway 399
- Coordinates: 30°59′36″N 92°58′56″W
- Area: 175.2 acres (0.709 km^{2})
- NRHP reference No.: 86003353
- Added to NRHP: October 24, 1986

Fullerton is an unincorporated community in Vernon Parish, Louisiana, United States. Fullerton was once an industrial community (1907-1927), having developed around a large lumber mill. In 1986, the former company town was added to the National Register of Historic Places as Fullerton Mill and Town because of their role in industry and in the development of housing for the mill workers.

== Conflict of name ==
In addition to its current name, the community was believed to have been known as "Russville" at a point. The official usage has been "Fullerton" since 1975, when the Board on Geographic Names ruled against the usage of "Russville." Although the reasoning behind the attempted name change is unclear, there is evidence that the name Russville was used on a map. The term "official" usage comes about because of the ruling but the mill and community known as "Fullerton" has been the common name since the beginning. The name "Russville" possibly came about because of an error.

== History ==
=== The sawmill ===
Fullerton mill opened in 1907 by Gulf Lumber Company, with headquarters in Illinois and owned by Samuel Holmes Fullerton, was ahead of its time especially for a sawmill. Built entirely of steel, iron, and concrete with no combustible materials Samuel invested 3.5 million dollars to build the mill. On a 10-hour shift the mill produced 400,000 board feet. A 50,000 gallon water storage tank provided water for the mill with a 1000-gallon per minute fire pump. There were 25 planners and 12 dry-kilns capable of processing 400,000 board feet. The loading dock was protected by a roof and was built so that thirty rail cars could be loaded at one time. A trolley system was in place so a loaded rail car could be transported to different location in the mill according to need. It is estimated that the mill cut 2.25 billion board feet consuming 4.2 million trees in the 20 years of operation. Activities in Fullerton were regulated by the steam whistle of the mill. The days started and ended with a whistle as it announced the beginning and ending of the work day. One unique feature of Fullerton was that the employees were paid with cash, not paper script or tokens as did most mills.

=== The community ===
400 houses were built for white workers of from five to seven rooms that included running water to every house and a bathroom and toilet. There were 144 cottages for the "colored workers" and all the houses had electricity. The layout of the community was well planned with streets and avenues. There was a two-story hospital, a 45-room two-story hotel, and a church that seated 1000. There was also a school, commissary, department store, drug store, meat market, cold storage room, barber shop, billiard hall, post office, cafe, feed store, dentist, public telephones, bank, Ford dealership and a jail. Community life included a theater, dance pavilion, town band, baseball and basketball team, Boy Scout troop and public swimming pool. Fullerton also had an elementary and high school. Religious life was centered around both Protestant and Catholic churches and their related service organizations.

=== Turpentine still ===
There was a turpentine still that was part of the Fullerton mill, but situated approximately two miles south, and a supporting community in between that included 129 cottages, a commissary, church, school (that provided an education to both communities), meat market, and a building that provided cold drinks and ice cream. There was also a train depot. This community was known as Rustville. The turpentine still and community was named after Paul D. Rust, the secretary of Gulf Lumber Company, from Boston.

=== Alcohol ===
The Fullerton mill also produced drinking alcohol from wood chips and sawdust. In 2019 Japanese researchers "invented" a way to make potable wood grain drinking alcohol.

== End of an era ==
The final log, that had been saved for twenty years for the occasion, was cut on Friday, May 6, 1927. The final whistle blew signaling the end of an era as well as the demise of a mighty sawmill and community.

== Notable person ==
- Mary Evelyn Parker, Louisiana state treasurer, was born in Fullerton.

== Climate ==
The climate in this area is characterized by hot, humid summers and generally mild to cool winters. According to the Köppen Climate Classification system, Fullerton has a humid subtropical climate, abbreviated "Cfa" on climate maps.
