= Antoine Dubuclet =

American politician

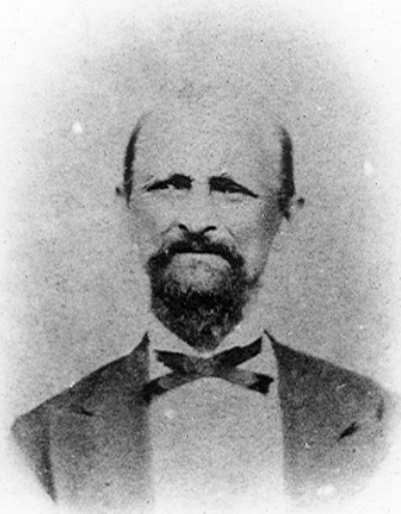

Louisiana State Treasurer
- In office 1868–1878
- Governor: Joshua Baker; Henry C. Warmoth; P.B.S. Pinchback; John McEnery; William Pitt Kellogg; Stephen B. Packard; Francis T. Nicholls
- Preceded by: Adam Griffin
- Succeeded by: Edward A. Burke

Personal details
- Born: 1810 Iberville Parish, Louisiana, US
- Died: December 18, 1887 (aged 77) Iberville Parish
- Resting place: St. Louis Cemetery No. 2, New Orleans
- Party: Republican
- Spouse(s): Claire Pollard Dubuclet (died 1852) (9 children); Mary Ann Walsh Dubuclet (3 children)
- Parent(s): Antoine Sr. and Marie Felecite Gray Dubuclet
- Profession: Sugar planter

Antoine Dubuclet Jr. (1810 – December 18, 1887) was the State Treasurer of Louisiana from 1868 to 1878. Before the American Civil War, Dubuclet was one of the wealthiest African Americans in the nation. After the war, he was the first person of African descent to hold the office of Louisiana treasurer.

== Early life ==
Dubuclet was born in Iberville Parish near Baton Rouge. He was the son of Antoine Dubuclet Sr. and Rosie Belly. Both were free Blacks; his father was part owner of Cedar Grove, a successful sugar plantation he inherited from his parents, Joseph Antoine Dubuclet and Marie Felecite Gray. Upon his father's death, his mother moved to New Orleans with her younger children; Dubuclet took over his father's responsibilities and assisted in managing the plantation and enslaving more than seventy people. In 1834, the plantation was divided between Dubuclet and his siblings.

== Family ==
In the mid-1830s, Dubuclet met and married Claire Pollard, a wealthy free woman of color who owned a plantation and enslaved 44 people. This marriage lasted till she died in 1852. Dubuclet's successful management of his and his wife's properties allowed him to acquire additional properties, including a plantation on the west bank of the Mississippi upriver from New Orleans. By 1860, he enslaved more than one hundred people and was considered the wealthiest Black enslaver in Louisiana. His first wife, Claire, died in 1852. They had nine children together and sent them to France for their education. Several of his daughters remained there and married Frenchmen. Two of his sons received degrees in medicine. In the early 1860s, he remarried Mary Ann Walsh. They had three children.

== Later career ==
The American Civil War devastated Louisiana's sugar industry and impoverished Dubuclet and his fellow planters.

== Political career ==
In 1868, Dubuclet was nominated as the Republican candidate for state treasurer. Later that year, Dubuclet and the entire Republican ticket won the election. Dubuclet took financial charge of a bankrupt state. Dubuclet, along with other state administration members, successfully reduced the state's debt. He was joined in this work by two of his sons, who served as his clerks. Dubuclet was reelected both in 1870 and 1874. Dubuclet was the only officeholder allowed to remain in office during the minor coup d'état, known as the Battle of Liberty Place that occurred in September 1874. Dubuclet survived an impeachment attempt in 1876 and did not seek reelection in 1878.

== Death and legacy ==
Dubuclet died on December 18, 1887, in Iberville Parish. His remains were transported and interred in the family tomb in St. Louis Cemetery No. 2 located in New Orleans. In 1990, Dubuclet was inducted into the Louisiana Black History Hall of Fame.

Political offices
Preceded by Adam Giffin	Louisiana State Treasurer; 1868 – 1878	Succeeded by Edward A. Burke
