= Edward A. Burke =

American and Honduran politician (1839–1928)

Louisiana State Treasurer
- In office 1878–1888
- Governor: Francis T. Nicholls; Louis A. Wiltz; Samuel D. McEnery
- Preceded by: Antoine Dubuclet
- Succeeded by: William Henry Pipes

Personal details
- Born: September 13, 1839 Louisville, Kentucky, USA
- Died: September 24, 1928 (aged 89) Tegucigalpa, Honduras
- Party: Democratic
- Spouse: Susan Elizabeth Gaines (died 1916)
- Children: Lindsey Burke (died 1896)
- Profession: Railroad manager

Edward Austin Burke or Burk (September 13, 1839 – September 24, 1928), was the Democratic State Treasurer of Louisiana following Reconstruction. Burke later fled to Honduras after it was discovered that there were misappropriations of state treasury funds. While in Honduras Burke became a major land owner and held government positions within Honduras' nationalized railway systems. He remained an exile until his death nearly four decades later.

== Early life and career ==
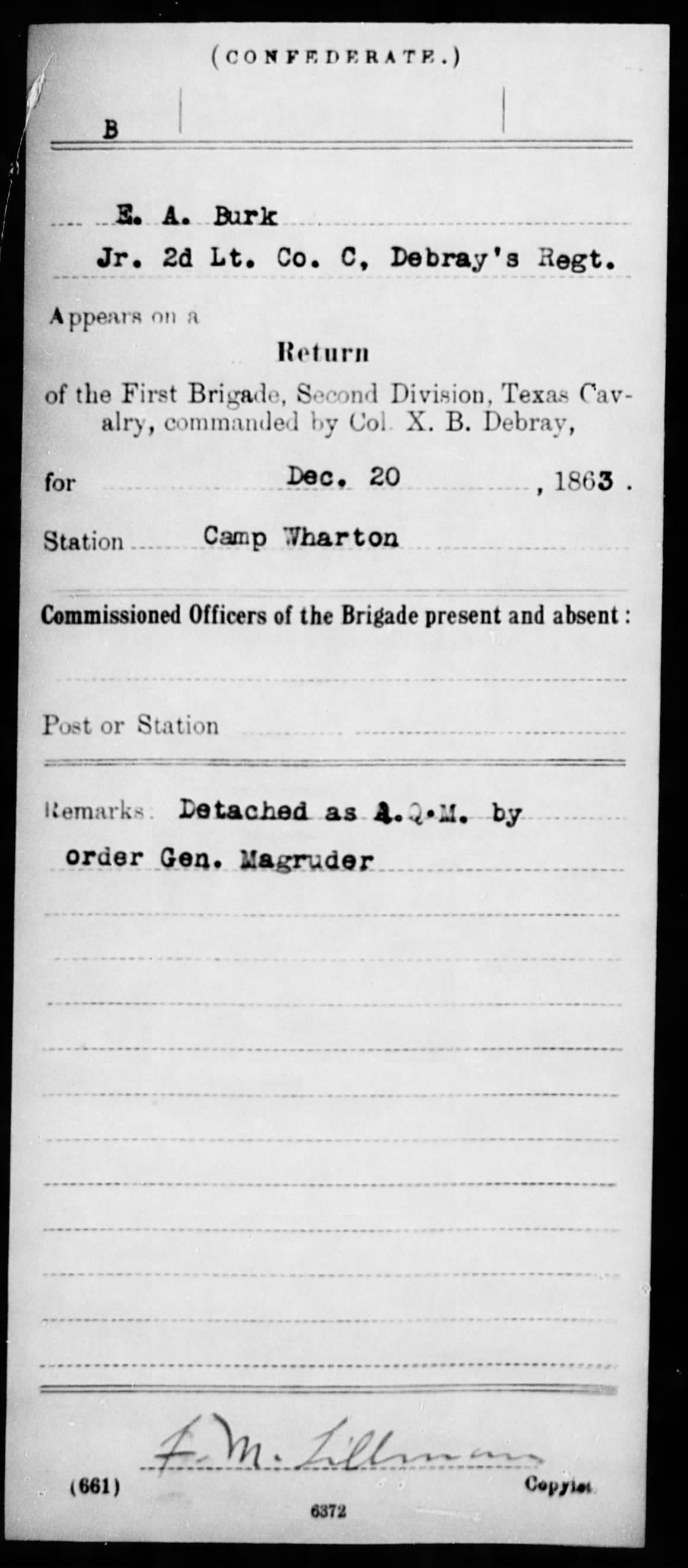
Confederate Army document noting Burke's transfer to quartermaster

Burke, by his own account, was of Irish descent and born in Louisville, Kentucky. He used the name "Burk" until after the Civil War. Burk's initial career started with the railroads. At the age of thirteen he was employed as a railroad telegraph operator in Urbana, Illinois. By the age of seventeen, he had been promoted to a division superintendent. The outbreak of the Civil War found Burke working for a railroad in Texas. On October 7, 1861, he was commissioned as a Confederate officer into Debray's Mounted Battalion. His knowledge of transportation logistics gained through his years of railroad experience resulted in his temporary transfer to Texas' Office of Field Transportation in March 1863. By December of that year the transfer was permanent. Major E.A. Burk commanded the Houston Battalion, Texas Infantry of 145 men. By war's end Burke had reached the rank of major with a duty assignment as Quartermaster and Chief Inspector of Field Transportation, District of Texas. After the war Burke's business career wavered. In Galveston he initially found work as telegraph operator and then as a manager of a cotton factorage. He later teamed up with another former Confederate officer, H. B. Stoddart, and formed the import export firm, Stoddart & Burk. The firm primarily exported cotton and imported liquor. In January 1869, the firm faced tax evasion charges from failure to pay federal taxes due on the imported alcohol. The charges against Burke were eventually dismissed, but the litigation left the firm and Burke in bankruptcy. Burke tried to revitalize his fortunes by being elected the Chief Engineer of Galveston's volunteer fire department.

== New Orleans ==
Burke next appears in New Orleans in May 1869. At this point Burke added an "e" to his last name; prior to his arrival in New Orleans, Burke signed his name without an "e". Burke may have been trying to establish a new life in New Orleans and the minor name change may have helped him avoid Galveston creditors and distance himself from the alcohol tax scandal. Throughout his life, Burke also quoted different years of birth. Burke arrived in New Orleans during a commercial convention. He informed local New Orleanians, that he was in town to attend the convention and he was from the engineering firm of Stoddart & Burke. Burke, at first, found odd jobs in New Orleans, but eventually landed a position as a freight agent with the New Orleans, Jackson & Great Northern Railroad. In December 1869, Burke cut all his ties with Galveston, by tendering his resignation as chief engineer of the Galveston Fire Department. In 1874 the New Orleans, Jackson & Great Northern Railroad was reorganized as the New Orleans, St. Louis & Chicago Railroad.

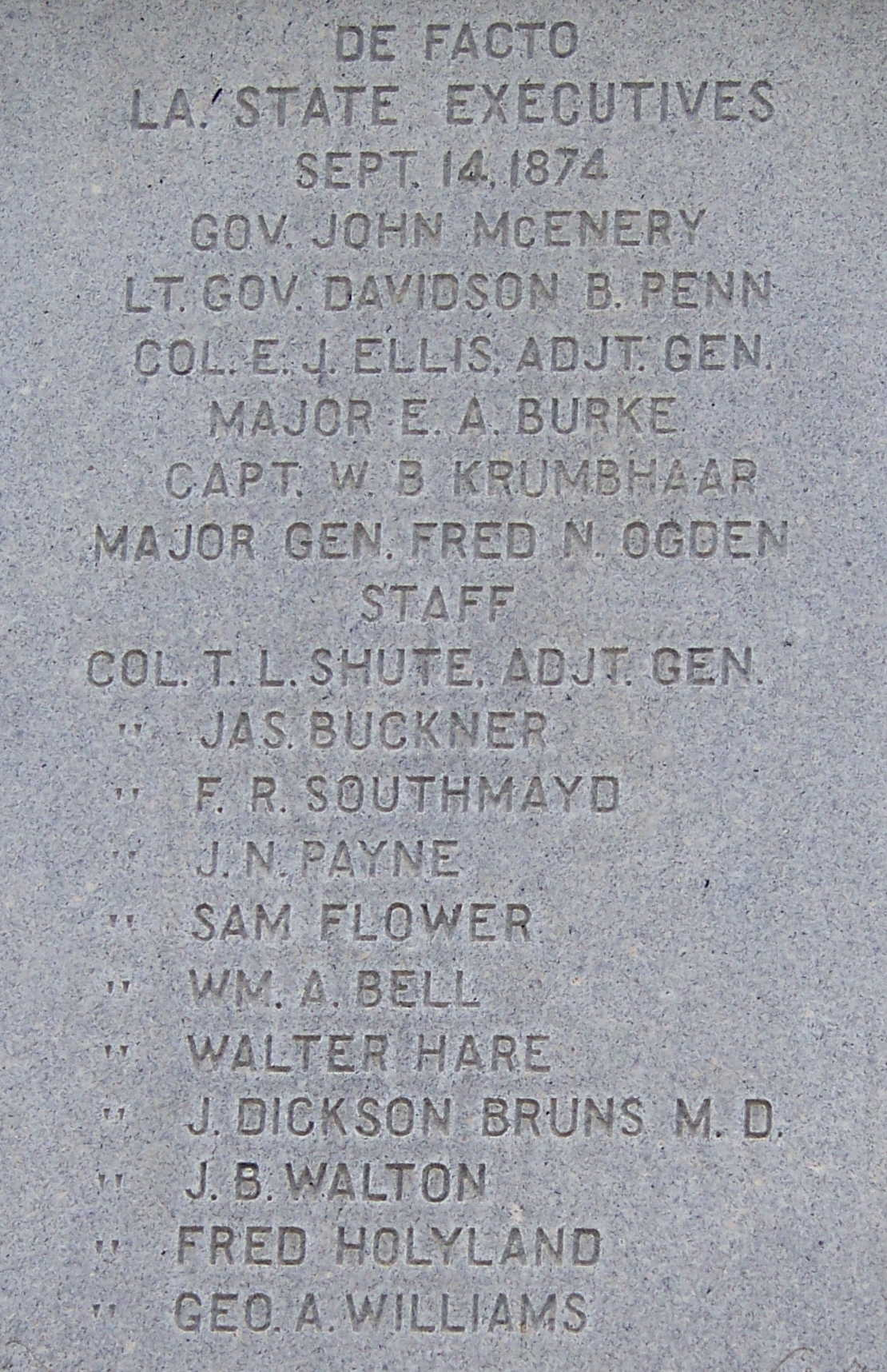
Major Burke's name inscribed in the north face of the Battle of Liberty Place Monument in New Orleans

In his newly adopted city Burke developed a friendship with Louis A. Wiltz, at the time, a politically ambitious banker. Burke became deeply involved within Democratic Conservative and white supremacist political circles in New Orleans. In 1872, Burke ran as the Democratic nominee for the city council position of Administrator of Improvements. The nomination of an independent candidate split the conservative vote allowing a Republican to win the post. The 1872 election was not a total loss for Burke, his political mentor, Wiltz, was elected mayor of New Orleans. Over the next decade Burke would become a crucial operative in the rise of the New Orleans Democratic machine. In September 1874 Burke was one of the key figures in the uprising and attempted coup d'état against the racially integrated elected government, known as the Battle of Liberty Place. During the coup, organized by the Crescent City White League, armed men shot firearms and cannons throughout the city in an attempt to terrorize the Republican state leaders from office. Burke was appointed State Registrar of Voters by the insurgency leadership. The insurgency lasted three days, with approximately 13 deaths and at least 70 injuries incurred. The arrival of federal troops restored the previous administration. Nevertheless, tensions within the city of New Orleans remained high for weeks. In October, at a New Orleans intersection, Burke attempted to assault the then Governor William Pitt Kellogg. The altercation escalated into an exchange of pistol fire between the two. Although no one was injured, the attack resulted in the arrest of Burke. At the governor's request, as a sign of peace, Burke was eventually released. In November of that same year Burke again ran for Administrator of Improvements. This time he won. Two years later Burke guided Francis T. Nicholls in his election campaign for governor. The results of this election were in dispute, with both sides claiming victory and accusing the other side of voter fraud. Overshadowing this election was the disputed presidential election of 1876. Burke then went to Washington to take part in the so-called Compromise of 1877; which confirmed a win for the Republican presidential candidate, a win for Louisiana's Democratic governor candidate, and guaranteed removal of federal troops from Louisiana. The Compromise also ratified Burke's friend, Wiltz, as the Lieutenant Governor. This accomplishment earned Burke much political clout. As a reward Burke was appointed State Tax Collector, considered one of the most lucrative offices within the state government.

In 1878, Burke ran for the office of state treasurer and had an easy victory. It became apparent to both Burke and Wiltz that Governor Nicholls aims did not coincide with theirs. The two then began to influence party delegates towards their goals. Because of the rift, Nicholls decided not to seek a second term. Delegates were also persuaded to extend the current term of the state treasurer's office from four to six years and to give the Louisiana Lottery a state charter for 25 years. The Democratic convention ended with Wiltz being the nominee for governor. In the election of 1879 voters elected Wiltz governor, ratified the extended term of the state treasurer's office, and confirmed the 25-year state charter for the Louisiana Lottery. The Louisiana Lottery would prove to be a lightning rod for controversy in the coming years.

== Politics, journalism, and defending honor ==
One of the major critics of the Louisiana Lottery was Henry J. Hearsey, the editor of the New Orleans Democrat. Burke and Charles T. Howard, spokesperson and the ipso facto power within the Louisiana Lottery, conspired to financially undermine the Democrat. At the time the Democrat had an abundance of state scrip, earned through state printing contracts. For the most part, the Democrat used this scrip as cash to pay its bills and suppliers. In 1879 Howard brought suit in federal court questioning the use of state scrip in payment of state debts. The court ruled that the scrip had no legal value. The Democrat, unable to satisfy its creditors and facing bankruptcy, was sold to a consortium, consisting of Burke, Howard, and others. Hearsey left the Democrat to become the editor-publisher of the New Orleans Daily States. After the purchase was finalized a second judicial ruling reversed the first decision restoring the value of state scrip. Burke resumed control of the Democrat as its managing editor.

Bad blood between both Burke and Hearsey resulted in a challenge to a duel from Hearsey. On January 25, 1880, both men faced off and exchanged pistol fire. At the conclusion of the duel, neither man was wounded and both considered their honor to be intact.

In 1881, Burke bought out his partners and became the sole owner of the Democrat. On December 4 of that same year, Burke bought the New Orleans Times. He then combined the two newspapers into the Times-Democrat. Burke's newspaper was used to advocate his view of the New South. The Daily Picayune was also highly critical of Burke and his cronies. One stinging article in 1882 accused Burke of improprieties with the treasury funds. Incensed, Burke challenged the editor of the Daily Picayune, C. Harrison Parker, to a duel. Since Parker was challenged, dueling etiquette allowed Parker to select the dueling weapon of choice; Parker chose rifles, but on the actual day of the duel he rethought his decision and chose pistols. Parker was a better shot than Burke's previous opponent and succeeded in seriously wounding Burke in his right thigh.

== Cotton Centennial ==
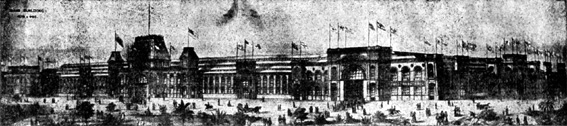
Central Building of the World Cotton Centennial

In 1882, the National Cotton Planters Association proposed the idea of a "World Cotton Centennial". The organization called on New Orleans and other southern cities to bid for the honor of hosting the event. The proposal was not well received by southern cities still recovering from the aftermath of the Civil War. In order to stir up more publicity for the idea the National Cotton Planters Association in 1883 succeeded in having Senator Augustus Hill Garland of Arkansas introduce a bill in the US Senate to encourage the holding of a World's Industrial and Cotton Centennial Exposition in 1884. This bill was approved by both houses of Congress. With public sentiment improving, a committee was formed. Commissioners and alternate commissioners from several states were to be appointed by the President. A governing body of thirteen directors was provided, six of whom were named by the President on the recommendation of the association and seven by him on that of a majority of the subscribers in the city in which the event was sponsored. With the future of the event becoming more of a reality, funding within the city of New Orleans started to grow. Burke's newspaper, the Times-Democrat was the first to pledge $5,000 towards the exposition. When $325,000 in pledges had been achieved the committee directors offered Burke the position of the exposition's director-general with a salary of $25,000. Burke initially refused, stating that his duties as both a newspaper editor and state treasurer would not allow enough time. Burke finally accepted when the committee directors appealed to his southern pride by hinting that they might have to include in their search — a Northerner. He refused the salary of $25,000, but accepted a salary of only $10,000 a year, which he directed should be invested in exhibition stock, to be later presented to the Agricultural and Mechanical College of Louisiana. Burke, once in command, proceeded to expand the idea of a merely local or even national exhibition into one which should embrace the entire world. With less than the needed funding, he began the erection of a building costing $325,000. While meeting much opposition to his plans, Burke, nevertheless forged ahead. Franklin C. Morehead, the perennial president of the National Cotton Planters Association and editor-publisher of its official chronicle, the Planters Journal, was appointed to travel and interest state governments, manufacturing firms and foreign countries. Burke went to Washington in May, 1884, and succeeded in having a bill in Congress passed loaning $1,000,000, to be paid from the receipts of the exposition, if there were any surplus over expenses. The sum of $100,000 was also granted to the exposition fund by the Louisiana Legislature, for Congress had tied up its loan by a restrictive clause making the fund available only when $500,000 had been raised from other sources. Finally by August, 1884, a total of one million and a half was in sight. Of this amount $5,000 was to be given to each state and territory to be expended under the direction of its governor by a commission nominated by him and appointed by the President of the United States. These state exhibits thus came to be the strongest feature of the entire exhibition. The space allotted in advance for these state exhibits was soon found to be inadequate for the elaborate displays which resulted from the momentum given to this feature by the $5,000 appropriation, and it became necessary to erect a second building as large as the first. The publicity from the exposition propelled Burke into a second term as state treasurer in the election of 1884. With great fanfare the exposition opened on December 16, 1884. Despite the generous donation from Congress, cost overruns and an aura of funding misappropriations contributed to the financial failure of the exposition. Burke, foreseeing the inevitable, resigned his directorship three weeks before the enterprise was forced to an early closing on June 2, 1885.

== Honduras and treasury scandal ==
Honduras was one of three Central American countries to exhibit at the exposition. While their display was modest in comparison to others, their exhibit was highlighted by a personal visit to the exposition by Honduran President Luis Bográn. During this visit Bográn's host was Burke. Bográn was impressed by Burke's personality. The two became fast friends. Bográn was looking for someone to market the wealth of natural resources Honduras had to offer the world. Burke envisioned New Orleans as being the primary importing port for all of Central America's exports. In 1886 as an inducement to Burke, Bográn offered two large mining concessions along the Jalán and Guayape rivers in return for Burke's promise to help build an industrial school in Tegucigalpa, Honduras' capital city. Burke accepted and visited Honduras at least twice between 1886 and 1888. In 1888 a reform-minded opposition succeeded in defeating Burke.

The time Burke had used in connection with his position as state treasurer was now applied to develop his mining ventures. In 1889 Burke undertook a trip to London to secure financing for a modern mining operation. While in London his successor, William Henry Pipes, discovered significant discrepancies in amount of funds available in the state treasury. Burke was considered a primary suspect of this embezzlement. From London, Burke denied these allegations and stated he intended to return to New Orleans to confront his accusers. After reviewing the evidence on hand, a grand jury handed down nineteen indictments against Burke. The evidence indicated that Burke had failed to destroy state bonds which had been redeemed and issued additional baby bonds without authorization. Sources place the amount of missing treasury funds anywhere from $64,000 to $2 million. In early December, Burke decided not to return to New Orleans and was later personally welcomed by President Bográn to Tegucigalpa, Honduras. Burke did not come empty-handed; he had succeeded in acquiring financing of $8 million for his mining venture. Arresting Burke was not an issue, because Honduras had not yet formalized a set of extradition treaties with the U.S.

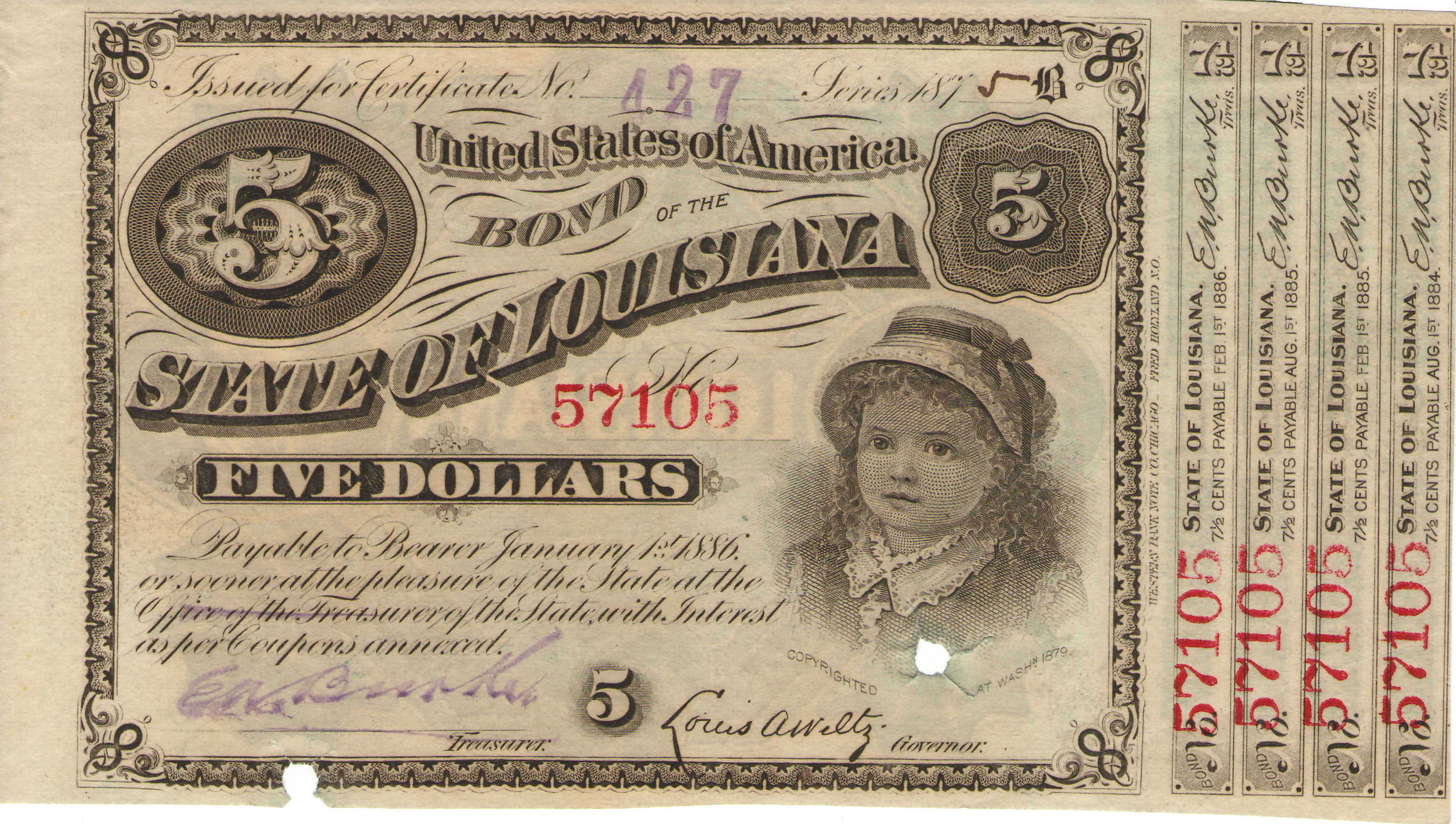
Louisiana baby bond with Burke's signature in violet

Burke's financial fortunes did not appear to fare well in Honduras. Burke had to contend with a number of financial panics in both London and Paris which caused investors to back out. He was also challenged with inclement weather and regime changes. In November 1893 Burke supported the losing side in a series of military skirmishes against Policarpo Bonilla. Burke and Domingo Vásquez had to flee to neighboring El Salvador. Eventually Burke came to terms with Bonilla and returned. During this same period of political upheaval, the opponents of the Louisiana Lottery succeeded in getting Congress to outlaw the interstate transportation of lottery tickets or lottery advertisements. The U.S. Supreme Court then affirmed that position. Instead of shutting down, the Louisiana Lottery decided to transfer its operations from New Orleans to Honduras. Very little is known, if Burke had any influence in steering the Louisiana Lottery to move to Honduras.

In June 1904, Burke accepted a position as the assistant superintendent and auditor of the Honduras Interoceanic Railway, one of the government's nationalized railroads. He held this position until August 1906. From 1912 to 1926, Burke held various positions within the National Railway of Honduras, also known as El Ferrocarril Nacional de Honduras, another nationalized railroad. In February 1926 Burke's associates back in New Orleans succeeded in nullifying all of his indictments. Even though Burke was vindicated, he decided to remain in Honduras. In 1928, Burke was on hand to greet Charles Lindbergh who was on a goodwill flight through Central America. This was not Burke's first encounter with a famous aviator. In 1919, Burke had unknowingly hired local Lisandro Garay as a driver. Garay would later become famous as an aviator in his own right, picking up the moniker — the "Honduran Lindbergh".

== Death and division of estate ==
Burke died on September 24, 1928, at the Hotel Ritz in Tegucigalpa. He was predeceased by his wife Susan Elizabeth (Gaines) by more than a decade. She died July 21, 1916. Burke's only son, and only child, Lindsey, died in the Congo Free State more than two decades before Burke. In 1895, Lindsey had volunteered for service in the Force Publique in the Congo Free State, where he was commissioned as a lieutenant. About a year later, he was killed when he and three other officers were leading a contingent of fifty men to suppress an uprising of African natives. The men scattered, when natives ambushed their party; Lindsey, with the other three officers, fought until they were hacked down and slashed to pieces. Burke bequeathed half of his property to the government of Honduras, the remainder to relatives in the U.S. Because of measures taken by the Honduran government, Burke's heirs in the U.S. received nothing.

== See also ==
- James "Honest Dick" Tate – a Kentucky state Treasurer who also fled the country once his fraud was discovered.

Political offices
Preceded by Antoine Dubuclet	Louisiana State Treasurer; 1878 – 1888	Succeeded by William Henry Pipes
