= SS Martin Behrman =

World War II Liberty ship of the United States

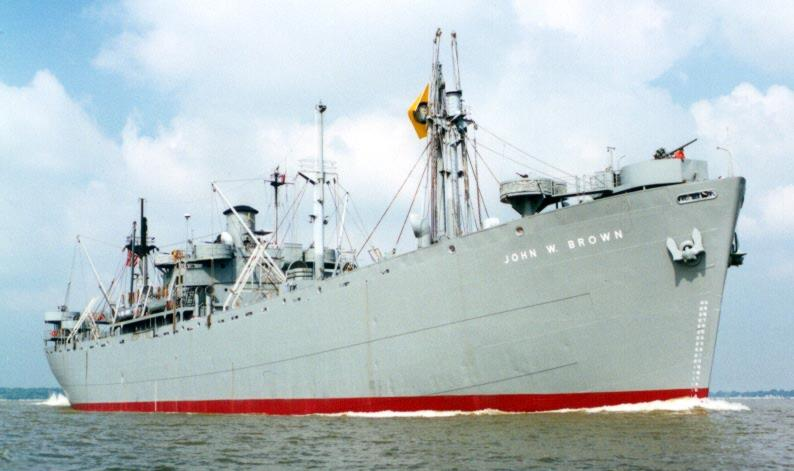
- Martin Behrman was a standard liberty ship, similar to SS John W. Brown, seen here.

History

United States
- Name: Martin Behrman
- Namesake: Martin Behrman
- Builder: Delta Shipbuilding Company, New Orleans
- Yard number: 153
- Way number: 2
- Laid down: 25 October 1944
- Launched: 4 December 1944
- Fate: Scrapped, 1965

General characteristics
- Class & type: Type EC2-S-C1 Liberty ship
- Displacement: 14,245 long tons (14,474 t)
- Length: 441 ft 6 in (134.57 m) o/a; 417 ft 9 in (127.33 m) p/p; 427 ft (130 m) w/l
- Beam: 57 ft (17 m)
- Draft: 27 ft 9 in (8.46 m)
- Propulsion: Two oil-fired boilers; Triple-expansion steam engine; 2,500 hp (1,900 kW); Single screw
- Speed: 11 knots (20 km/h; 13 mph)
- Range: 20,000 nmi (37,000 km; 23,000 mi)
- Capacity: 10,856 t (10,685 long tons) deadweight (DWT)
- Crew: 81
- Armament: Stern-mounted 4 in (100 mm) deck gun for use against surfaced submarines, variety of anti-aircraft guns

SS Martin Behrman was an American Liberty ship built in 1944 for service in World War II. Her namesake was Martin Behrman, long-time mayor of New Orleans, Louisiana. For the war she was operated by the Isbrandtsen Line under charter with the Maritime Commission and War Shipping Administration.

Among the Liberty ships, the Martin Behrman was an EC2-S-C1 Type with Maritime Commission hull number 2827. Like other Liberty ships, she was 441 feet (134 m) long and 56 feet (17 m) wide, carried 9000 tons of cargo and had a top speed of 11 knots (20 km/h). Most Liberty ships were named after prominent deceased Americans.

This particular ship was built by Delta Shipbuilding Company in New Orleans. Her keel was laid on 25 October 1944 and she was launched on 4 December 1944. The Delta shipyard was started specifically for the war effort, at a site on the Industrial Canal near the Almonaster Avenue Bridge, immediately south of the present-day I-10 high-rise bridge. The yard was shut down after the end of the war.

The Martin Behrman survived World War II and saw service in the Korean War. In 1947 she was engaged in the Indonesian trade in defiance of a Dutch blockade, and on one voyage her cargo was confiscated by the Dutch Navy.

She was scrapped at Portland, Oregon in 1965. Her bow, along with the bows of many other Liberty ships, is buried at the Liberty Ship Memorial Park in Portland.
