= Louisiana State Treasurer =

Position in the U.S. state of Louisiana

State Treasurer of Louisiana
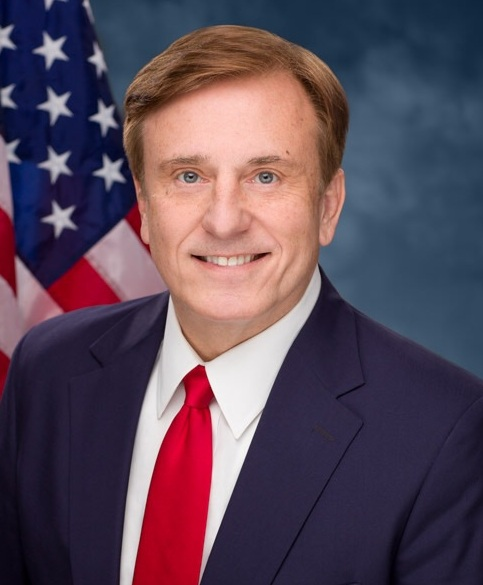
- Incumbent; John Fleming since January 8, 2024
- Style: The Honorable
- Term length: Four years, no term limits
- Formation: Constitution of Louisiana, Article IV, Section 9
- Succession: Fourth
- Website: www.treasury.la.gov

The Louisiana State Treasurer is an elected constitutional officer in the executive branch of the state government of Louisiana responsible for overseeing the financial operations of state government. The state treasurer is an elected position, with four year terms. The Louisiana State Treasurer is John Fleming, a Republican.

Past state treasurers Mary Landrieu and John Kennedy were subsequently elected to the United States Senate.

== Partial list ==
- Joseph Marshall Walker, 1846–1849
- Antoine Dubuclet, 1868–1878
- Edward A. Burke, 1878–1888
- Jesse S. Cave, 1932–1936
- A. P. Tugwell, 1936–1968
- Mary Evelyn Parker, 1968–1987
- Mary Landrieu, 1987–1996
- Ken Duncan, 1996–2000
- John Kennedy, 2000–2017
- Ron Henson, 2017
- John Schroder, 2017–2024
- John Fleming, 2024–present
