= Mary Evelyn Parker =

Louisiana politician

Treasurer of Louisiana
- In office 1968–1987
- Preceded by: A. P. Tugwell
- Succeeded by: Mary Landrieu

Personal details
- Born: November 28, 1920 Fullerton, Louisiana, U.S.
- Died: January 17, 2015 (aged 94) Baton Rouge, Louisiana, U.S.
- Education: Northwestern State University

Mary Evelyn Parker (November 28, 1920 – January 17, 2015) was an American education, newspaper editor, and politician who served as the Treasurer of Louisiana from 1968 to 1987. She was the first woman to serve in the position.

== Early life and education ==
Mary Evelyn Dickerson was born in Fullerton, Louisiana. Her father, Racia Dickerson, worked at a saw mill and her mother, Addie née Graham Dickerson, was a homemaker. She studied at Northwestern State University, where she competed on the debate team.

== Career ==
She taught English and edited the Oakdale Journal before her career in public office. She also worked as a real estate agent.

She narrated gubernatorial candidate Earl Long's speeches on the radio for his campaign in 1948.

She succeeded A. P. Tugwell as Louisiana State Treasurer in 1968. She resigned as State Treasurer in 1987 was succeeded by Mary Landrieu.

== Death ==
She died at her home in Baton Rouge at age 94.

Party political offices
Preceded by A. P. Tugwell	Democratic nominee for Treasurer of Louisiana; 1972, 1975, 1983	Succeeded by Mary Landrieu
