= A. P. Tugwell =

American politician (1889–1976)

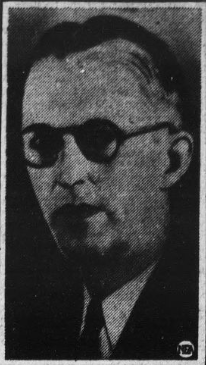

Treasurer of Louisiana
- In office 1936–1968
- Governor: See list: Oscar K. Allen James A. Noe Richard W. Leche Earl Long Sam H. Jones Jimmie Davis Earl Long Robert F. Kennon Earl Long Jimmie Davis John McKeithen
- Preceded by: Jesse S. Cave
- Succeeded by: Mary Evelyn Parker

Personal details
- Born: Andrew Patrick Tugwell; November 7, 1889 Plain Dealing, Louisiana, U.S.
- Died: February 12, 1976 (aged 86) Baton Rouge, Louisiana, U.S.
- Resting place: Greenoaks Memorial Park in Baton Rouge
- Party: Democratic
- Spouse: Rebecca Tugwell
- Children: 1
- Education: Northwestern State University

A. P. Tugwell (November 7, 1889 – February 12, 1976) was an American politician who served as Treasurer of Louisiana from 1936 to 1968. Tugwell had previously served as Chairman of the Louisiana Highway Commission.

== Early life and education ==
Tugwell was born in Plain Dealing, Louisiana, and raised in Winn Parish, Louisiana, where he attended public schools. He then graduated from the State Normal College at Natchitoches (now Northwestern State University).

== Career ==
During Huey Long's tenure as governor, Tugwell was appointed as the first auditor for the Louisiana Railroad Commission. He was later appointed head of the Louisiana Highway Commission. Tugwell was elected Treasurer of Louisiana in 1936. He was the running mate of former governor Sam H. Jones in the 1948 Louisiana gubernatorial election, though the ticket was defeated by Earl Long and Bill Dodd. To date, Tugwell is the longest-serving Treasurer of Louisiana.

== Death ==
Tugwell died on February 12, 1976.

Party political offices
Preceded by Jess S. Cave	Democratic nominee for Treasurer of Louisiana; 1936, 1940, 1944, 1948, 1952, 1956, 1960, 1964	Succeeded by Mary Evelyn Parker
