= 1934 New Orleans mayoral election =

New Orleans mayoral election, 1934
- January 23, 1934
Candidate	T. Semmes Walmsley	John Klorer, Sr.	Francis Williams
Party	Democratic	Democratic	Independent
Alliance	Regular Democratic Organization	Longite
Popular vote	47,753	32,066	28,085
Percentage	44.3%	29.7%	26.0%
Mayor before election
T. Semmes Walmsley
Democratic
Elected mayor
T. Semmes Walmsley
Democratic

The New Orleans mayoral election of 1934 was held on January 23, 1934. It resulted in the re-election of T. Semmes Walmsley as Mayor of New Orleans.

== Candidates ==
The incumbent mayor, T. Semmes Walmsley, was backed by the Regular Democratic Organization, a powerful political machine which had dominated the city for decades, as well as by the wealthy residents of the city's Uptown neighborhood. Francis Williams, a longtime enemy of Senator Huey Long, was backed by an independent political organization led by himself and his brother. Long, looking to break the hold of the Old Regulars over New Orleans, searched for his own candidate, but potential nominees Paul H. Maloney and Joe O'Hara were reluctant to face the Old Regulars. Long eventually convinced John Klorer, Sr., a respected engineer and father of the editor of Long's American Progress newspaper, to head the Long ticket.

== Campaign ==
The campaign was a vigorous one, with a level of vitriol and excitement uncommon even by New Orleans standards. Walmsley emphasized his close ties with popular President Franklin Delano Roosevelt, and portrayed the campaign as a referendum on Huey Long. Klorer, a quiet unassuming man, kept a low profile while Huey Long did most of the public speaking for the Klorer campaign. Huey gave daily radio broadcasts interspersing tirades against the mayor he called "Turkey Head" Walmsley with amusing songs. Both Williams and Long accused the Old Regulars of tolerating vice and embezzling municipal funds. Walmsley responded to Huey's insults by threatening to "choke those words down his cowardly throat next time we meet."

In the final days of the campaign, Long supporters were caught removing names of Old Regular supporters from the voter rolls, so the registration books were seized by the civil sheriff and placed in the Orleans Parish Prison for safekeeping. Long's ally Governor Oscar K. Allen ordered the Louisiana National Guard to mobilize for New Orleans to defend the registrar's office, while Walmsley threatened to deputize ten thousand "special police." With potential armed clashes between the National Guard and Walmsley's police looming, a last minute agreement to submit to an arbitration committee averted a crisis.

== Results ==
Walmsley won reelection with 47,753 votes (44%), followed by Klorer with 32,066 (30%) and Williams with 28,085 (26%). Walmsley and Klorer faced a runoff election, but with Williams adamantly refusing to endorse a Long candidate, Klorer withdrew from the race. The results were seen across the state and nation as a defeat for Long.

== Sources ==
- Boulard, Garry. Huey Long Invades New Orleans: The Siege of a City, 1934-36. Pelican, 1998.
- Hair, William Ivy. The Kingfish and his Realm: The Life and Times of Huey P. Long. LSU Press, 1991.
- Parker, Joseph B. The Morrison Era: Reform Politics in New Orleans. Pelican, 1974.
- Williams, T. Harry. Huey Long. Knopf, 1969.
