= Samuel H. Fullerton =

- Born: December 31, 1852; St. Louis County, Missouri, United States.
- Died: 1939 (aged 89–90)
- Occupation: Lumber baron
- Known for: Gulf Lumber Company, Bradley Lumber Company, and establishing Fullerton, Louisiana

Samuel Holmes Fullerton (1852-1939) was an American lumber baron and president as well as vice-president of several companies. He was the founder and president of the Gulf Lumber Company,

== Early life ==
Samuel's parents were Samuel and Anna (Holmes) Fullerton, Samuel was born in Ireland, and immigrated to the United States when seventeen years old. He married Lucy Cook, of Clay Center, Kansas and they had three children; Robert, Ruby, and Samuel Baker Fullerton.

== Business ventures ==
Fullerton owned sawmills in Arkansas, Idaho, Louisiana, Minnesota, Mississippi, Washington, and Wisconsin.

=== Gulf Lumber Company ===
Fullerton founded the Gulf Lumber Company (1907-1927) in Fullerton, Louisiana after purchasing 106,000 acres (43,000 ha) for 6 million dollars, building the largest sawmill in the region, largest west of the Mississippi, and second in size only to the Great Southern Lumber Company in Bogalusa. The mill cost 3.5 million dollars to build. During the company's operation the mill cut 2.25 billion board feet that involved the cutting of 4.2 million trees.

=== Railroads ===
In 1910 work began on the Gulf and Sabine River Railroad. The 10 miles (16 km) line was to connect the Fullerton mill to Leesville and the Santa Fe Railroad to Lake Charles.
