= World Cotton Centennial =

1884-1885 expo held in New Orleans, Louisiana

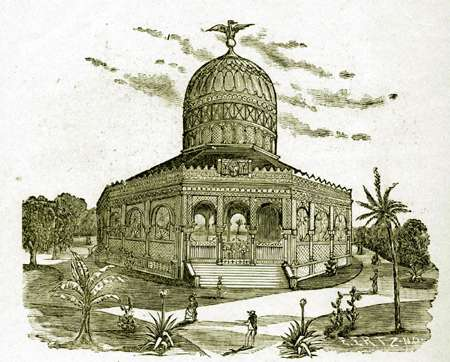
- Engraving of the Octagonal Building, part of the Mexico exhibit

Overview
- BIE-class: Unrecognized exposition
- Name: World Cotton Centennial
- Area: 249 acres (101 ha)

Location
- Country: United States
- City: New Orleans, Louisiana
- Venue: Audubon Park (New Orleans)
- Coordinates: 29°56′03″N 90°07′25″W

Timeline
- Opening: December 16, 1884
- Closure: June 2, 1885

The World Cotton Centennial (also known as the World's Industrial and Cotton Centennial Exposition) was a World's Fair held in New Orleans, Louisiana, United States, in 1884–1885. At a time when nearly one third of all cotton produced in the United States was handled in New Orleans and the city was home to the New Orleans Cotton Exchange, the idea for the fair was first advanced by the Cotton Planters Association. The name "World Cotton Centennial" referred to the earliest-surviving record of export of a shipment of cotton from the U.S. to England in 1784. Gustave M. Torgerson who lived in Meridian was selected and supervising architect and designed the main building.

== History ==
Visitor's Guide, readable pdf file

The U.S. Congress lent $1 million to the fair's directors and gave $300,000 for the construction of a large U.S. Government & State Exhibits Hall on the site. However, the planning and construction of the fair was marked by corruption and scandals, and state treasurer Edward A. Burke absconded abroad with some $1,777,000 of state money including most of the fair's budget. Despite such serious financial difficulties, the Fair succeeded in offering many attractions to visitors.

The Centennial covered 249 acres (101 ha), stretching from St. Charles Avenue to the Mississippi River, and could be entered directly by railway, steamboat, or ocean-going ship. The main building enclosed 33 acres (13 ha) and was the largest roofed structure constructed up to that time. It was illuminated with 5,000 electric lights (still a novelty at the time, and said to be ten times the number then existing in New Orleans outside of the fairgrounds). There was also a Horticultural Hall, an observation tower with electric elevators, and working examples of multiple designs of experimental electric street-cars. The Mexican exhibit was particularly lavish and popular, constructed at a cost of $200,000, and featuring a huge brass band that was a great hit locally.

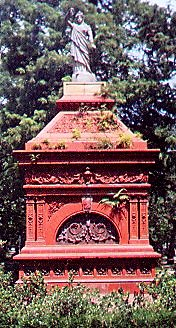
Peace, the Genius of History monument from the fair, now on Esplanade Avenue

On December 16, 1884, U.S. President Chester Arthur opened the fair via telegraph (two weeks behind schedule). It closed on June 2, 1885. In an unsuccessful attempt to recover some of the financial losses from the Fair, the grounds and structures were reused for the North Central & South American Exposition from November 10, 1885, to March 31, 1886, with little success. After this the structures were publicly auctioned off, most going only for their worth in scrap. The term "Pan-American" was not used in the fair's title, since it was just coming into popular use in the press in the late 1880s.

The site today is Audubon Park and Audubon Zoo in Uptown New Orleans.

Preceded by Melbourne International Exhibition (1880)	World Expositions; 1884	Succeeded by Exposición Universal de Barcelona (1888)
