= Van Alstyne =

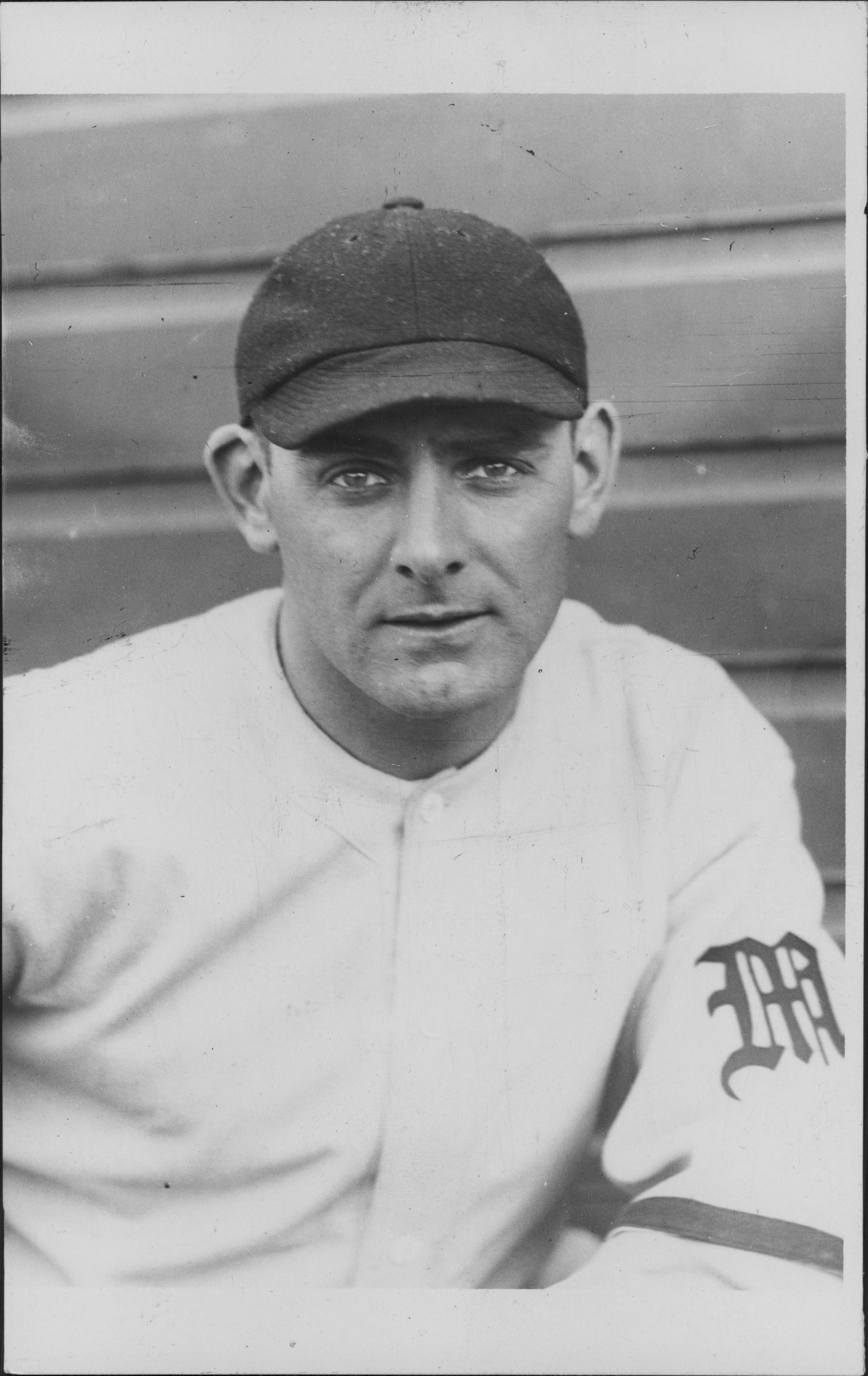
Clayton Van Alstyne

Van Alstyne is a Dutch surname also found as "Van Alstine". Notable people with the surname include:

- Benjamin Van Alstyne (1893–1972), American basketball coach
- Egbert Anson Van Alstyne (1878–1951), songwriter
- Frances van Alstyne (1820–1915), usually known as Fanny Crosby, American hymnwriter
- Henry A. Van Alstyne (1869–1947), New York engineer and surveyor
- James Van Alstyne (born 1966), professional poker player
- Marshall Van Alstyne (born 1962), academic
- Thomas J. Van Alstyne (1827–1903), U.S. Representative from New York
- William Van Alstyne (1934–2019), constitutional law scholar and professor at William & Mary Law School

== See also ==
- Van Alstyne, Texas
