= Garry Boulard =

American biographer

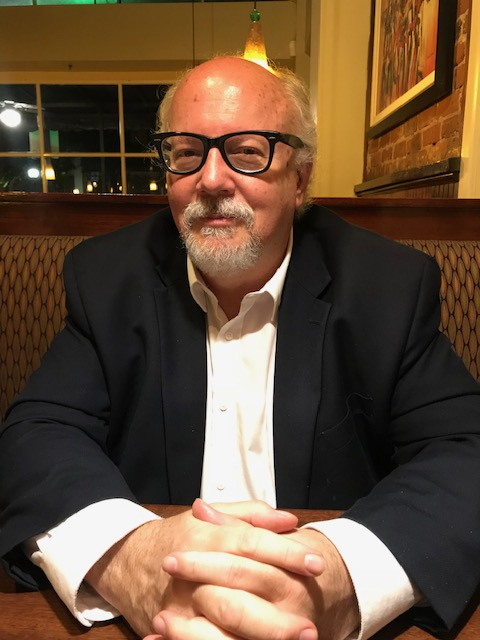
- Born: 1953 (age 72–73)

Garry Boulard (born 1953) is a reporter and author whose work has appeared in the New York Times, Los Angeles Times, Christian Science Monitor, Chicago Tribune and Times-Picayune, among other publications.

Boulard's first book was published in 1989: Just a Gigolo: The Life and Times of Louis Prima by the Center for Louisiana Studies. The book was praised in 1990 by musicologist Rhodes Spedale in the journal Louisiana History: "There is much to recommend in this biography...the author's depiction of Prima as a bandleader and businessman is illuminating in a factual, historical manner." The book was re-released in 2002 by the University of Illinois Press as Louis Prima. Said writer Bill Sweeney in the journal Popular Music : "Boulard is at his best in painting the social, ethnic, and family background to Prima's development in the early decades of the twentieth century." Keitth Briggs in the monthly Blues Revue lauded the book, noting "Its quality is attested by its being judged worthy enough to win release under its new title in the University of Illinois Press' prestigious Music in American Life series."

In 1998, the Pelican Publishing Company released Boulard's Huey Long Invades New Orleans, a book that won the praise of Lester Sullivan in Gambit Weekly: "Boulard knows how to write. The prose is succinct and well-paced, the book is smoothly read and hard to put down."

In the Times-Picayune, Susan Larsen characterized Boulard's writing as "vivid and compelling, he captures Huey Long in all his larger-than-life appetites and ambitions."

David Roberts in the Bloomsbury Review remarked: "With the skills of a researcher and the descriptive talents of a story teller, Boulard keeps the history interesting, the story moving and the passages colorful."

Michael L. Kurtz, Southeastern Louisiana University history professor, wrote in the Journal of American History that Boulard's book was "well-written and thoroughly researched...a valuable contribution to our knowledge and understanding of that fascinating individual and era in Louisiana history."

The 2001 release of Boulard's The Big Lie—Hale Boggs, Lucille May Grace and Leander Perez in 1951 (Pelican) prompted Louisiana State University history professor Jerry Sanson to laud a "Well-written, highly useful account of a colorful event in the state's political history." Boulard's footnotes, added Sanson, "include references to copious amounts of primary and secondary resources as well as numerous interviews that he conducted as he explored his topic."

In 2003 North Carolina State University history professor Pamela Tyler in the Journal of Southern History, described Boulard as "a freelance journalist with an obvious relish for the pungency of Louisiana politics," adding that Boulard had done "solid work in a multitude of archival sources."

The Big Lie has since been listed in the bibliography for Hale Boggs on the official site of the U.S. Congress Biography Guide.

A second Boulard book on Long published by Pelican Publishing in the summer of 2003 won mixed reviews. University of Wisconsin professor Glen Jeansonne, also the author of a Huey Long biography, criticized it for being too much of a popular history and failing to explore the dark side of the Long regime: "Boulard is chiefly a storyteller and his book is breezy and brisk," wrote Jeansonne, "yet the ideas are derivative." Times-Picayune columnist Angus Lind described the book as a "quick read" that "tells not only in words but in a wonderful collection of artwork the story of the man dubbed 'the Kingfish.'" In the Arkansas Review, Gordon Harvey wrote: "Garry Boulard has attempted, and succeeded, in capturing Long's larger-than-life career and persona."

In 2006, Boulard released The Expatriation of Franklin Pierce—The Story of a President and the Civil War. (iUniverse). The book is included in the Library of Congress's Research Guides website notes that the book is among "the most significant editions of works by Pierce". It has since been referenced in the World Book Encyclopedia.

Boulard released The Swing Around the Circle--Andrew Johnson and the Train Ride that Destroyed a Presidency in 2008. It has since been referenced by Áine Cain in Business Insider, Justin Fox in BNN Bloomberg, and Jamelle Bouie in The New York Times.

Boulard released The Worst President: The Story of James Buchanan, in the summer of 2015, a book looking at the life of the 15th president of the United States with a focus on the months between the 1860 election and the coming of the Civil War in 1861. The book was also recommended was James Carafano, writer and vice-president of The Heritage Foundation, in The National Interest.

When the University of New Hampshire considered renaming the Franklin Pierce School of Law in the aftermath of the George Floyd protests in Minneapolis–Saint Paul in 2020, Boulard argued that maintaining Pierce's name was "worthy of careful consideration" due to his record as an anti-war dissident during the American Civil War.

In April 2021 Boulard was the guest of the White House Historical Association as part of a program discussing the life and career of President Franklin Pierce.

Boulard's essays and reviews have appeared in the Journal of Southern History, Louisiana History, Journal of Mississippi History, Florida Historical Quarterly and Gulf Coast Historical Review.

1. "Book Reviews," Louisiana History, Volume 31, Number 3, Summer 1990, 311–12; "Reviews," Popular Music, Volume 23, Number 1, January 2004, 99–100; "Louis Prima," Blues Revue , November 2002, 124.
