= Paul Capdevielle =

American mayor

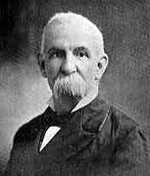

45th Mayor of New Orleans
- In office May 7, 1900 – December 5, 1904
- Preceded by: Walter C. Flower
- Succeeded by: Martin Behrman

Personal details
- Born: January 15, 1842 New Orleans, Louisiana, U.S.
- Died: August 13, 1922 (aged 80) Bay St. Louis, Mississippi, U.S.
- Party: Democratic
- Spouse: Marie Emma Larue
- Profession: Military, politician

Military service
- Allegiance: Confederate States
- Branch/service: Confederate States Army
- Years of service: 1861-1865
- Rank: Private
- Unit: (Louisiana) New Orleans Guard Infantry, Boone's Artillery, Legardeur's Artillery
- Battles/wars: American Civil War

Paul Capdevielle (January 15, 1842 – August 13, 1922) was an American politician who was mayor of New Orleans, Louisiana, from May 9, 1900, to December 5, 1904.

== Biography ==
Of French descent, he was educated at the Jesuit College of New Orleans, graduating in 1861. He served in the Confederate Army in the American Civil War, in the New Orleans Guard Regiment of Infantry, then in Boone's Louisiana Artillery. He was captured at Port Hudson, Louisiana in July, 1863. Paroled shortly afterward, and subsequently exchanged, he entered Legardeur's artillery battery, and continued in the Confederate service till the close of the war, when he surrendered at Greensboro, North Carolina, returning to New Orleans on foot.

He read law at the Tulane University Law School, graduating in 1868, and worked as an attorney until 1892. In 1892 he gave up the law to accept the presidency of the Merchants' Insurance Company, an important firm which was eventually liquidated. For thirteen years Capdevielle was its president.

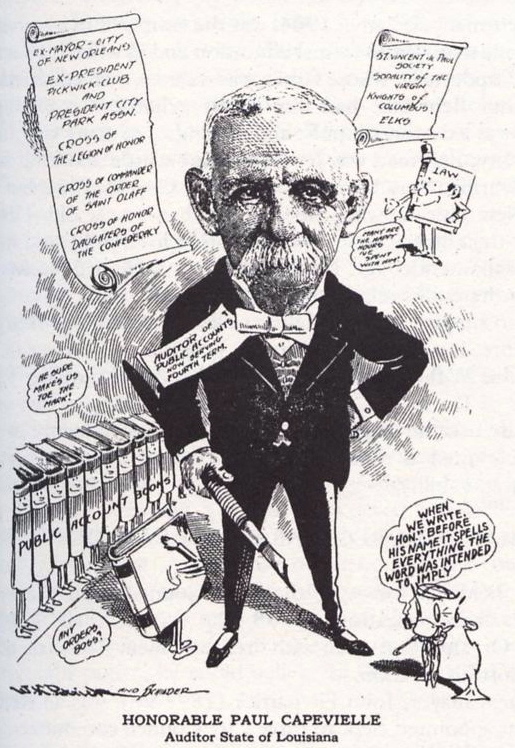
1917 cartoon depicting former mayor Capdeville when he was Auditor of the State of Louisiana

His political history began in 1877, when he was appointed to the State School Board by Governor Nicholls. While he was a member of this body the entire state school system was reorganized and put into effective operation. Subsequently, he was appointed a member of the New Orleans Levee Board. In the election of 1900 he was the nominee of the Regular Democratic Organization; he won with 19,366 votes versus 13,099 for his predecessor Walter C. Flower.

His tenure as mayor was marked by the installation of the modern sewage and drainage system, by the Robert Charles race riots, and a visit by President William McKinley (the first US president to visit the city while in office).

After his mayoral term, Capdevielle served as president of the New Orleans Public Library Board and as State Auditor of Public Accounts. He is buried in St. Louis Cemetery No. 2.

== Honors ==
Honors conferred to Mr Capdevielle:

- Cross of the Legion of Honor 1902.
- Cross of Commander of the Order of Saint Olaff, 1902.
- Cross of Honor, United Daughters of the Confederacy.
- Degree of LL, St Louis University, 1904.

Preceded by Walter C. Flower	Mayor of New Orleans; 1900–1904	Succeeded by Martin Behrman
