= Craig E. Steidle =

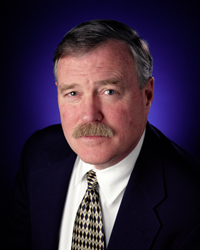
- Born: July 12, 1945 (age 81); Oakland, California, U.S.
- Military career
- Branch: United States Navy (Ret.)
- Service years: 1968–2000
- Rank: Rear Admiral
- Awards: NASA Distinguished Service Medal; NASA Medal for Outstanding Leadership; Defense Distinguished Service Medal; Navy Distinguished Service Medal; Legion of Merit; Distinguished Flying Cross; Meritorious Service Medal with gold star Air Medals with bronze star Navy Commendation Medal

Rear Admiral Craig Eugene Steidle, USN, Ret., (born July 12, 1945) served as the first associate administrator of the Office of Exploration Systems at NASA (now known as the Exploration Systems Mission Directorate), an organization formed to implement NASA's human exploration of the Solar System as announced in the Vision for Space Exploration. Admiral Steidle also served as program manager of the Joint Strike Fighter Program. He is currently serving as a distinguished visiting professor in Aerospace Engineering at the U.S. Naval Academy.

During his tenure with the United States Navy, Admiral Steidle became most well known for his prominent role as program manager of the Joint Strike Fighter, where he managed the "fly off" between the X-32 and the X-35 to determine what design would ultimately become the F-35 Lightning II. Admiral Steidle also commanded the Navy's F/A-18 program, the naval aviation's largest production research and development program, as well as the largest foreign military sales program.

== Navy career ==
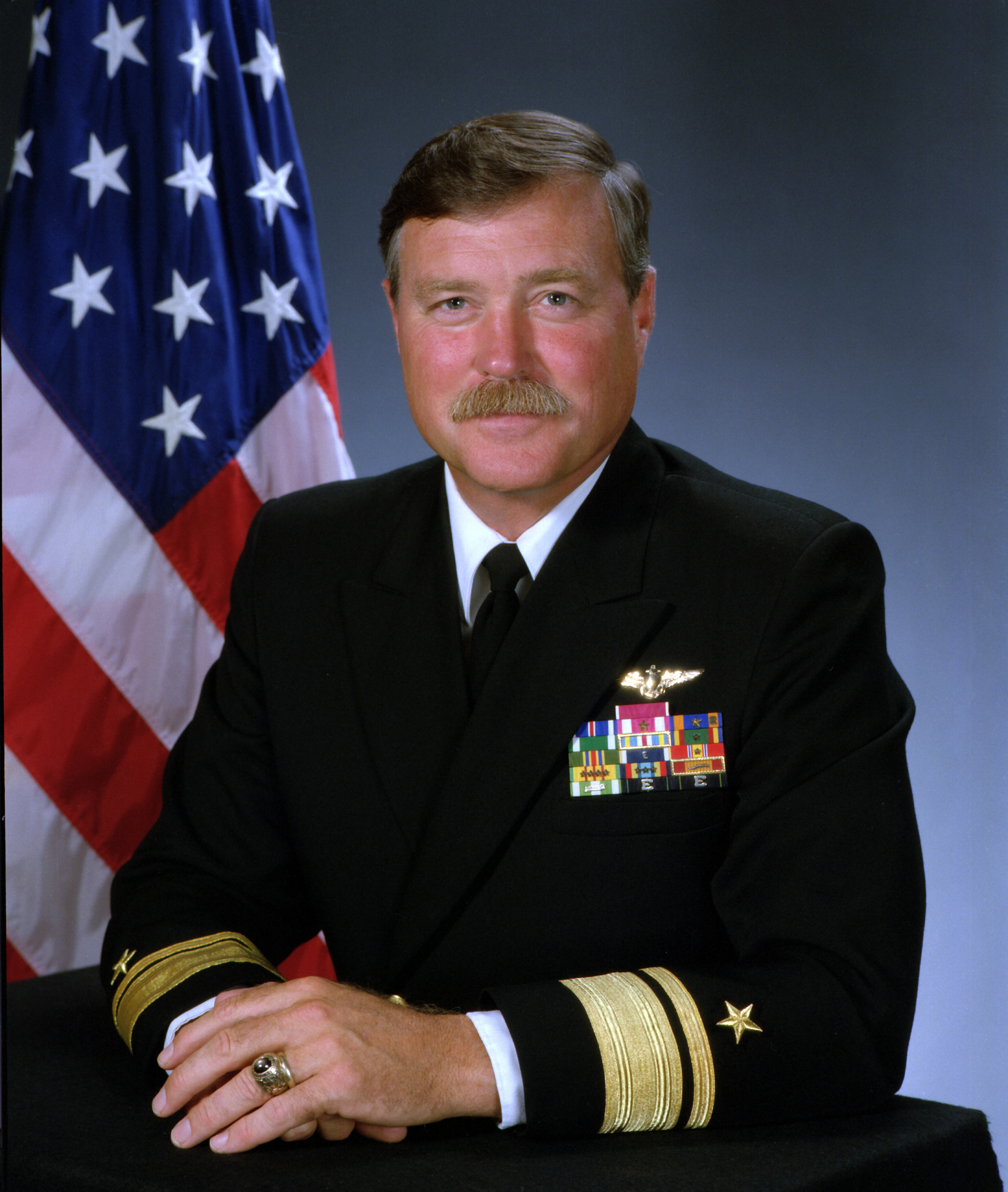
Official U.S. Navy portrait as a rear admiral

Admiral Steidle joined the Navy after he graduated from the U.S. Naval Academy in Annapolis, Maryland in 1968. In the Navy, he trained to become an attack pilot and flew carrier night combat missions over North Vietnam. In the 1980s he deployed on carriers, frigates, and cruisers in the Western Pacific and Indian Ocean. Steidle went on to command the Navy's F/A-18 program, and then became the director of the DOD Joint Advanced Strike Technology Office. The admiral opted to retire from the Navy in March 2000.

== Post-Navy Career ==
After retiring from the Navy, Craig Steidle worked as a self-employed aerospace consultant. In January 2004, Adm. Steidle accepted a position as associate administrator of the Office of Exploration Systems at NASA. The purpose of the Office of Exploration Systems was to design, develop, and produce the new architecture and vehicles to send the United States beyond Earth orbit for the first time since the Apollo Moon missions which occurred from 1968 to 1972. The Centennial Challenges prize program was also implemented by the Office of Exploration Systems during this time. The office was renamed the Exploration Systems Directorate in an August 2004 restructuring. Admiral Steidle officially resigned from the position of associate administrator for exploration systems in June 2005. He served as a visiting professor in aerospace engineering at the U.S. Naval Academy for five years and then briefly as the president of the Commercial Spaceflight Federation before fully retiring in 2011.

== Education ==
Craig Steidle grew up in Huntington, Long Island, New York, and attended the U.S. Naval Academy in Annapolis, Maryland, where he graduated with merit in 1968. Later, Steidle went to the University of Southern California and earned a Master of Science degree in systems management. He also attended Virginia Polytechnic Institute and State University where he earned a Master of Science degree in aerospace engineering. Admiral Steidle was a distinguished graduate from the U.S. Naval Test Pilot School in June 1976.

== Personal ==
Admiral Steidle resides in Southern Maine. His daughter, Gretchen Ki Steidle is the founder of Global Grassroots (www.globalgrassroots.org), a nonprofit which assists marginalized women in Rwanda and Uganda and helps them start social entrepreneurships to better their communities. His oldest son, Brian Steidle, former captain in the US Marine Corps, served as a peace monitor in Darfur during the Darfur Conflict and wrote a book with his sister about his experiences, The Devil Came on Horseback, which was turned into a documentary film of the same name that premiered at the Sundance Film Festival in 2007. Steidle's youngest son, Eric Steidle, USNA '04, is a commander in the US Naval Reserves.
