= Arthur J. O'Keefe =

American politician

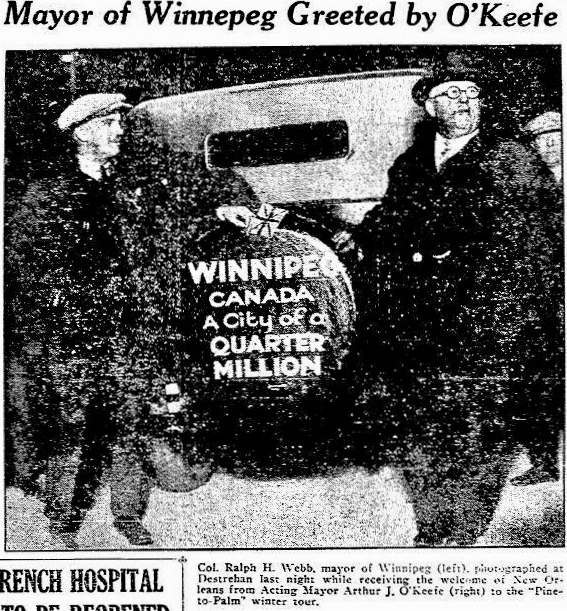
- Mayor O'Keefe (right) in 1926 with Winnipeg Mayor Ralph Webb, celebrating the Jefferson Highway linking the two cities

48th Mayor of New Orleans
- In office January 12, 1926 – July 15, 1929
- Preceded by: Martin Behrman
- Succeeded by: T. Semmes Walmsley

Personal details
- Born: November 8, 1876 New Orleans, Louisiana
- Died: November 14, 1943 (aged 67)
- Party: Democratic
- Spouse: Mamie McDonald O'Keefe
- Relations: Grandson, Michael H. O'Keefe; Great-grandson, Sean O'Keefe

Arthur Joseph O'Keefe, Sr. (November 8, 1876 – November 14, 1943) was mayor of New Orleans from 1926 through 1929.

== Life and career ==
Born in New Orleans, O'Keefe was the son of Arthur O'Keefe and the former Sarah Hanley. He was educated at the Catholic St. Aloysius High School and later went into business, eventually running his own coffee import company. He was also vice-president of the American Bank and Trust Company and director of the Lafayette Fire Insurance Company and the Mutual Building and Loan Association. He married Mamie McDonald of New Orleans in 1901. Before becoming mayor, O'Keefe was a prominent member of the Regular Democratic Organization, the political machine that had dominated New Orleans for decades. He served as the RDO's Tenth Ward boss, the city's Commissioner for Public Finance from 1925 to 1926, and after long-time mayor Martin Behrman died in office O'Keefe was elevated to serve the remainder of Behrman's term.

O'Keefe's term in office was marked by a controversy over whether two bridges over the Rigolets and Chef Menteur Pass would be toll-free bridges as advocated by Public Service Commissioner Huey Pierce Long, Jr., or toll bridges operated by a firm controlled by the mayor's political allies. O'Keefe also fought a bitter battle with Huey Long over piping cheap natural gas into New Orleans; an ally of the New Orleans energy monopoly NOPSI, O'Keefe unsuccessfully opposed the plan. Under O'Keefe's administration construction was begun on the Municipal Auditorium and plans for the Criminal District Court Building and Orleans Parish Prison were drawn up. He also served as president of the RDO's Choctaw Club.

In July 1929, O'Keefe resigned as mayor for health reasons; he was succeeded by T. Semmes Walmsley.

O'Keefe was Irish Catholic. He is the grandfather of the former president of the Louisiana State Senate Michael H. O'Keefe and the great-grandfather of former LSU Chancellor and former NASA Administrator Sean O'Keefe. Sean O'Keefe is a nephew of Michael O'Keefe.

== Sources ==
- Biographical Dictionary of American Mayors, 1820-1980. Greenwood Press, 1981.
- New Orleans Public Library, Louisiana Division. "Administration of Arthur J. O'Keefe." http://nutrias.org/~nopl/info/louinfo/admins/okeefe.htm
- Glenn R. Conrad, ed. Dictionary of Louisiana Biography. Louisiana Historical Association, 1988.

Preceded by Martin Behrman	Mayor of New Orleans; 1926–1929	Succeeded by T. Semmes Walmsley
