= T. Semmes Walmsley =

American politician (1889–1942)

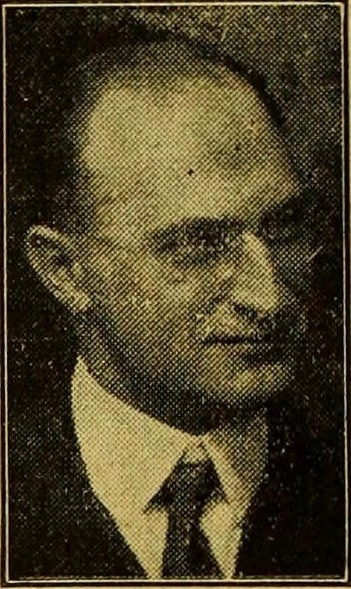
- Walmsley in 1921

49th Mayor of New Orleans
- In office July 15, 1929 – June 30, 1936
- Preceded by: Arthur J. O'Keefe
- Succeeded by: A. Miles Pratt (acting)

3rd President of the United States Conference of Mayors
- In office 1933
- Preceded by: James Michael Curley
- Succeeded by: Daniel Hoan

Personal details
- Born: June 10, 1889 New Orleans, Louisiana, U.S.
- Died: June 19, 1942 (aged 53) San Antonio, Texas, U.S.
- Party: Democratic
- Spouse: Julia Havard Walmsley
- Children: Augusta Walmsley King
- Profession: Lawyer

Military service
- Branch/service: United States Army Air Corps
- Battles/wars: World War I

Thomas Semmes Walmsley (June 10, 1889 – June 19, 1942) was an American attorney and politician who was the mayor of New Orleans from July 1929 to June 1936. He is also known for his rivalry with Louisiana Governor Huey Long.

== Early life and career ==
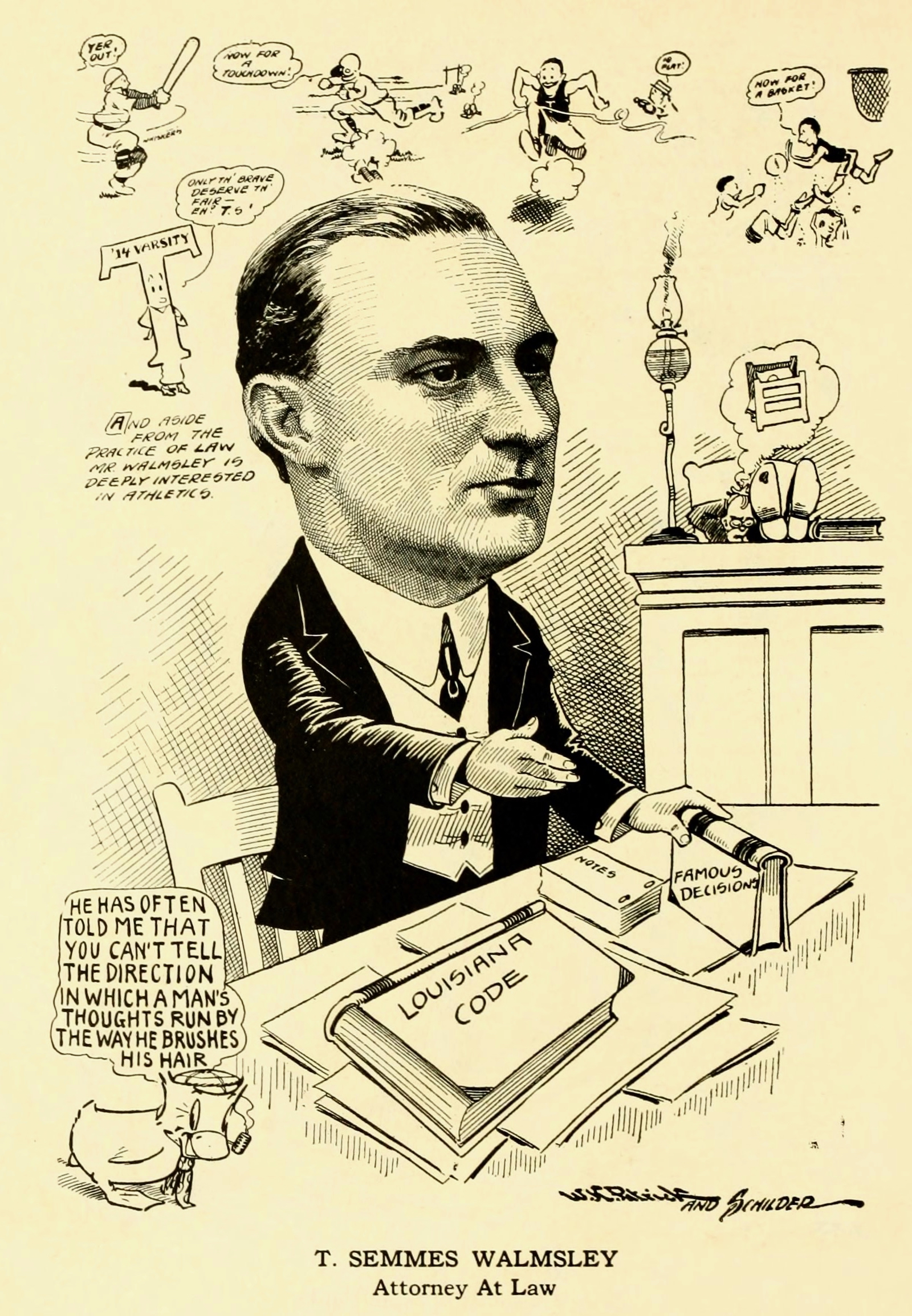
1917 cartoon of attorney Walmsley

Walmsley was born to a prominent family in Uptown New Orleans. He was the son of wealthy cotton factor Sylvester Pierce Walmsley and his wife, the former Myra E. Semmes. He attended Spring Hill College in Mobile, Alabama, and then Tulane University in New Orleans, where he was a student athlete. In 1912, he graduated from Tulane University Law School. After graduation, he became a lawyer for a New Orleans firm. On April 15, 1914, he wed the former Julia Havard of New Orleans, and the couple had one daughter, Augusta, later Mrs. Frederick J. King. He served in World War I as a major in the United States Army Air Corps, forerunner of the Air Force.

From 1919 to 1924, Walmsley served as an assistant attorney general of Louisiana. In 1925, he was appointed city attorney by Mayor Martin Behrman of New Orleans, and he became a prominent figure in Behrman's Regular Democratic Organization political machine. The Old Regulars helped him to be elected as commissioner of public finance, a post which he held from 1926 to 1929. In July 1929, Walmsley was appointed acting mayor of New Orleans to fill in for Behrman's successor, Arthur J. O'Keefe, who resigned because of illness.

Walmsley was also a member of the Boston Club, an exclusive, all-white New Orleans men's social club. His father, Sylvester Pierce Walmsley, was the first long-time captain of the Mistick Krewe; his brother, Sylvester Pierce Walmsley Jr, was captain of the Krewe of Rex.

== Walmsley as mayor ==
Walmsley was a conservative, patrician mayor who set a "pro-business" tone for his administration when, as one of his first acts as mayor, he confronted a militant strike by municipal streetcar workers. In one memorable scene, he confronted an angry crowd of striking workers who had come to the city council chambers to protest the banning of improvised 'jitney' transportation. He based his election campaign in April 1930 on his response to the strike and on his credentials in restoring 'law and order,' and beat opponent Francis Williams by a comfortable margin, winning 14 of 17 wards. Continuing in this vein, he later passed an ordinance banning the spread of "anarchistic, communistic, or radical doctrines" in New Orleans. He also fired almost two thousand black city employees by enforcing a Jim Crow law banning the employment of non-voters.

Walmsley's term as mayor continued an alliance between the city's social and economic elite and the city's most powerful political machine. Owing his political success to his membership in the Old Regular machine's Choctaw Club, Walmsley benefited from their ability to turn out votes and dispense patronage.

In 1933, Walmsley was elected president of the National Conference of Mayors.

Among the accomplishments of his administration were improvements in street paving and drainage, construction of the Municipal Auditorium, completion of a new Criminal Courts Building and the extension of New Orleans City Park towards the Lakefront.

=== Walmsley and Huey Long ===
Huey Long's election as governor in 1928 had brought a new force to Louisiana's political scene and threatened the hold of the Old Regulars on New Orleans. At first, Long had reached out to the Old Regulars by offering an alliance, but the Old Regulars participated in an attempt to impeach Long in 1929. Though initially reluctant, Walmsley accepted an alliance with Long after the Old Regulars' uncharacteristically weak showing in the 1930 U.S. Senate race which had sent Long to Washington, D.C., after Long unseated Joseph E. Ransdell in the primary election.

Walmsley claimed:

an obligation I owe to my people and the people of this state to join hands with Governor Long and bury our political tomahawk so that the city and state can forge ahead. ... The governor worked hard to develop a program we could all unite on; he was the victor, and he showed himself more generous. ... When the roads and bridges he is planning are completed, more of the city people will be going to the country, and more people will be coming to the city. ... Let us therefore forget all bickerings and let the capitalists and the laboring interests ... join hands as we have joined hands.

In return for the political support of the New Orleans machine, Long promised a bridge over the Mississippi River, a Lakefront Airport, and money for infrastructure improvements. The alliance brought overwhelming Old Regular support for Long's chosen successor as governor, Oscar K. Allen, who won 70 percent of the New Orleans vote in the gubernatorial election of 1932.

The alliance continued until December 1933, when Walmsley and the Old Regulars formally severed the relationship in advance of Walmsley's mayoral reelection campaign of 1934. Angered by Walmsley's repudiation of the alliance, Long picked John Klorer, Sr., to oppose Walmsley in a vitriolic campaign, culminating in a political crisis that only narrowly averted armed conflict between Long's and Walmsley's factions. Walmsley won the election, but the campaign strengthened the mayor and the governor's disdain for each other.

In response to attacks on Long by Walmsley's supporters in the state legislature in 1934, Long unleashed an unprecedented attack on Walmsley's power in New Orleans. Long proposed a series of bills cutting off state funding for the city and stripping municipal government of its traditional rights to issue licenses, assess property taxes, regulate public utilities, and control the police department. In response, Walmsley invoked the memory of the white supremacist White League's armed resistance to 'despotism' during Reconstruction in order to arouse New Orleanians to attend a rally against Long in Baton Rouge in the summer of 1934. Many attendees came armed and called for the lynching of the governor, but Walmsley belatedly toned down his rhetoric and asked for restraint.

After the rally, Long stepped up his assault on Walmsley by sending Louisiana National Guard troops to occupy the registrar of voters office across the street from New Orleans City Hall, setting up machine guns in the windows and declaring martial law. The confrontation escalated; Walmsley had 400 city police sent to City Hall, while Long increased his own troop strength to 3,000 and had them equipped with tear gas guns. The standoff climaxed during the congressional election of September 1934; but just as in the mayoral election in January 1934, the potential for armed conflict was averted by a last-minute truce in which both Long's National Guard and Walmsley's police agreed to stay off the streets on election day to prevent voter intimidation.

Long also initiated a wide-ranging corruption investigation of the Walmsley administration, staging lurid radio testimonials from witnesses. The legislative attacks continued through 1934 and 1935; Long had laws passed stripping the municipal government of its remaining powers by having the state set budget amounts for the city and forbidding the firing of any city employee without state approval. Without the ability to collect its own revenue, New Orleans was on the verge of bankruptcy by the summer of 1935. Long's assassination on September 8, 1935, did not end the state's discriminatory policies towards New Orleans. Dissatisfaction with this state of conflict with Long and caused Walmsley's own Old Regular ward leaders to ask the mayor to resign in the hope of ending the legislative siege. Walmsley continued to resist this pressure and remained in office despite the defection of nearly the entire Old Regular organization; the Old Regular-controlled city council stripped him of all remaining powers. Walmsley finally agreed to resign in June 1936; after several interim mayors, Walmsley would be succeeded by Robert Maestri, a Longite loyalist, and the municipal government would regain the powers stripped from it by the state legislature during the feud between Long and Walmsley.

== After City Hall ==
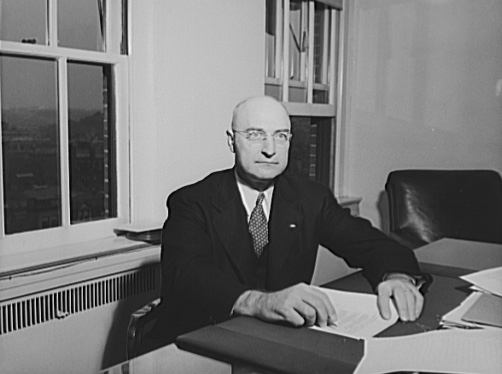
Walmsley as deputy director of the Office of Civilian Defense, 1941.

Years after his resignation as mayor, Walmsley moved to Washington to become deputy director of the Office of Civilian Defense in 1941, under Fiorello La Guardia. In March 1942, Walmsley returned to active service with the Army Air Forces, but he died three months later on June 19, 1942, of a heart attack in San Antonio, Texas.

== Sources ==
- Boulard, Garry. Huey Long Invades New Orleans: The Siege of a City, 1934–36. Pelican, 1998.
- Glenn R. Conrad, ed. A Dictionary of Louisiana Biography. Louisiana Historical Association, 1988
- New Orleans Public Library, Louisiana Division. "Administration of T. Semmes Walmsley." http://nutrias.org/~nopl/info/louinfo/admins/walmsley.htm

Political offices
Preceded by Arthur J. O'Keefe	Mayor of New Orleans; 1929–1936	Succeeded by A. Miles Pratt (acting mayor)
