= Walter C. Flower =

Mayor of New Orleans

Walter Chew Flower (August 6, 1850 – October 11, 1900) was the 44th Mayor of New Orleans (April 27, 1896 – May 7, 1900). He was one of the participants and killers in the 1891 New Orleans lynchings of 11 Italian immigrants.

== Early life ==
Flower was born in East Feliciana Parish, Louisiana in 1850, and was educated at Pass Christian College. He later studied law at Tulane University (then known as the University of Louisiana).

== Career ==
He worked as a reporter for the Daily Picayune and briefly practiced law before joining the cotton factoring firm of Edwin Nall & Co. In 1884, he founded his own firm, Flower Brothers, with his brother Ivy, and in 1888 formed a partnership with Branch M. King; in 1891 the firm became Flower, King and Putnam. He served as President of the New Orleans Cotton Exchange in 1891.

== Later life ==
In 1900, Flower died of tuberculosis at his summer home.

Political offices
Preceded by John Fitzpatrick	Mayor of New Orleans; April 27, 1896 – May 7, 1900	Succeeded by Paul Capdevielle
