= Martin Behrman =

American mayor

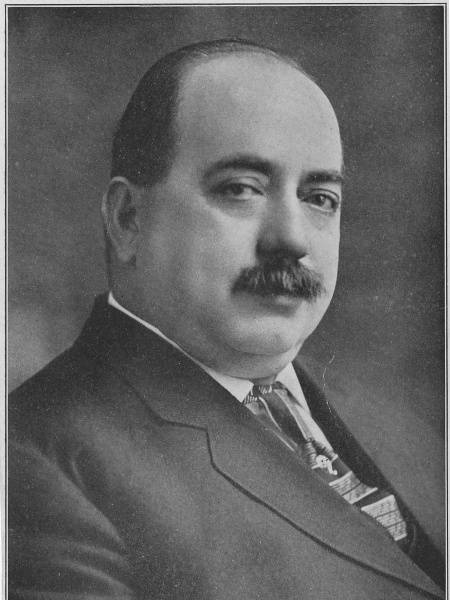

35th Mayor of New Orleans
- In office December 5, 1904 – December 20, 1920
- Preceded by: Paul Capdevielle
- Succeeded by: Andrew J. McShane
- In office May 4, 1925 – January 12, 1926
- Preceded by: Andrew J. McShane
- Succeeded by: Arthur J. O'Keefe

Personal details
- Born: October 14, 1864; New York City, New York, U.S.
- Died: January 12, 1926 (aged 61); New Orleans, Louisiana, U.S.
- Political party: Democratic

Martin Behrman (October 14, 1864 – January 12, 1926), an American Democratic politician, was the longest-serving mayor in New Orleans history.

== Life and career ==
Behrman was born in New York City, the son of Frederica and Henry Behrman. His parents were emigrants from Germany. He was ethnically Jewish, but "knew little about his faith." His parents brought him to New Orleans as an infant. He lived most of his life in the Algiers neighborhood, on the west bank of the Mississippi River. As a young man he became affiliated with the Regular Democratic Organization, a powerful political faction in New Orleans, during the 1888 campaign of Francis T. Nicholls for governor of Louisiana. Behrman served as a delegate to the Louisiana state constitutional convention in 1898.

Behrman eventually served as mayor for just under 17 years, first from 1904 to 1920. After four consecutive terms he was defeated by reform candidate Andrew J. McShane. Behrman ran again in 1925 and won, serving from 1925; he died in New Orleans on January 12, 1926, less than a year into his fifth term.

== Books by or about Martin Behrman ==
- Behrman, Martin (1977). Martin Behrman of New Orleans: memoirs of a city boss. Baton Rouge: Louisiana State University Press. LCCN 77006781.
- Kendall, John Smith (1922). "Chapter XXXV, Sixteen Years of Martin Behrman". History of New Orleans. Chicago: Lewis Publishing Company. LCCN 22022725.
- Reynolds, George M. (George Millar) (1936). Machine politics in New Orleans, 1897-1926: Studies in history, economics, and public law, no. 421. New York: AMS Press. LCCN 37016676.
- Celestín, Ray (2014). The Axeman’s Jazz. Macmillan Publishers Limited.

== Quotes ==
- "You can make it illegal, but you can't make it unpopular" (in reference to the closing of the Storyville district).

== Places/things named after Martin Behrman ==
- Behrman Avenue, New Orleans
- Behrman Highway, New Orleans
- Behrman Memorial Park, including Behrman Gym & Stadium, 2529 General Meyer Avenue, New Orleans
- Behrman neighborhood in Algiers
- Martin Behrman Avenue, Metairie, Louisiana
- Martin Behrman Walk, Metairie, Louisiana
- Martin Behrman Senior High School, whose faculty included State Senator Olaf Fink, later known as Martin Behrman Middle School, then Martin Behrman Elementary School, and finally Martin Behrman Charter School; 715 Opelousas Avenue, New Orleans
- SS Martin Behrman, a World War II Liberty ship

Preceded by Paul Capdevielle	Mayor of New Orleans; 1904–1920	Succeeded by Andrew J. McShane
Preceded by Andrew J. McShane	Mayor of New Orleans; 1925–1926	Succeeded by Arthur J. O'Keefe
