= Robert Maestri =

Mayor of New Orleans from 1936 to 1946

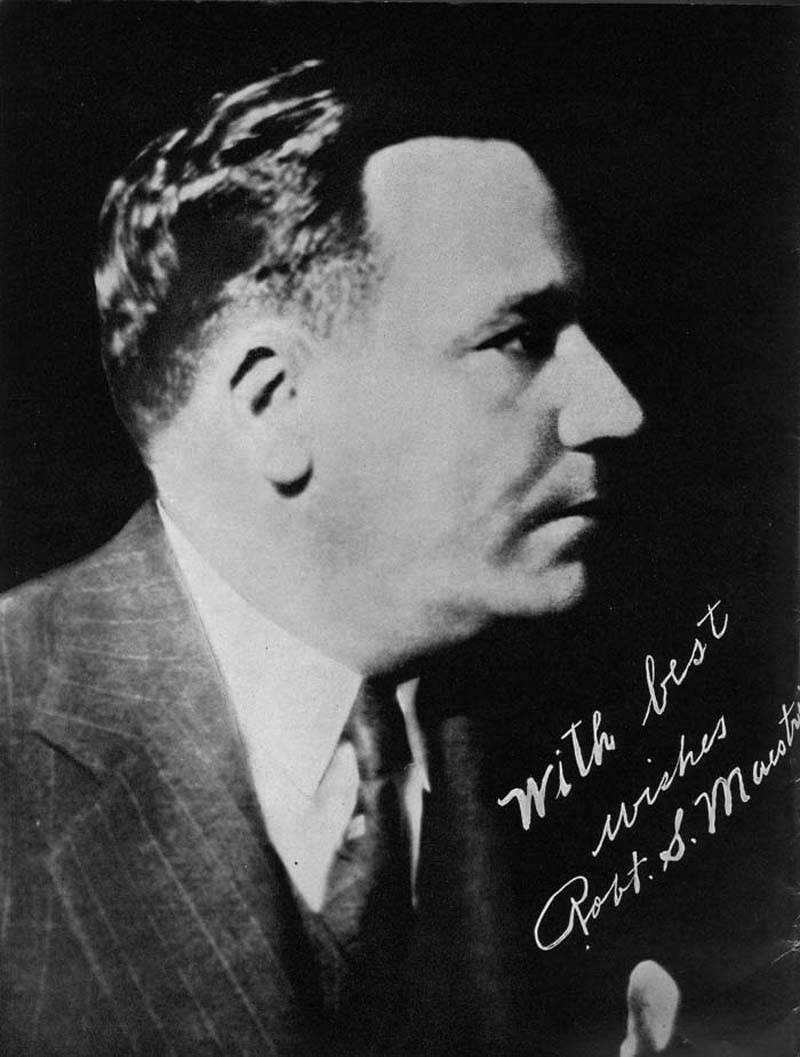
- Maestri in photo published in 1937

53rd Mayor of New Orleans
- In office August 18, 1936 – April 4, 1946
- Preceded by: Jesse S. Cave (acting mayor)
- Succeeded by: De Lesseps Story Morrison

Personal details
- Born: Robert Sidney Maestri; December 11, 1889 New Orleans, Louisiana, U.S.
- Died: May 6, 1974 (aged 84)

Robert Sidney Maestri (December 11, 1889 – May 6, 1974) was mayor of New Orleans from 1936 to 1946 and a key ally of Huey P. Long Jr. and Earl Kemp Long.

== Early life ==
Robert Maestri was born in New Orleans on December 11, 1889, the son of Francesco Maestri of Italian heritage and Angele Lacabe Maestri, of French heritage. He inherited his father's furniture store at an early age, and quickly built it up into one of the city's largest. After investing in real estate, Maestri was able to amass a considerable fortune. He also had political ambition, and after allying himself with governor Huey Long, he was appointed to head the state's Conservation Commission, which allowed him to control production quotas in the state's oil industry.

He served as conservation commissioner from 1929 to 1936, and was a powerful member of Long's inner circle. In his autobiography, Huey Long recalls how Maestri volunteered to raise money to fight Long's impeachment by the Louisiana House of Representatives.

== Rise to power ==
Maestri's association with the Longite political faction brought him to even greater prominence after Huey Long's death. Long had been involved in a lengthy and destructive feud with New Orleans Mayor T. Semmes Walmsley, and after his death, both sides were interested in ceasing hostilities. In 1936, an agreement was reached between Longite governor Richard Leche and Walmsley's Regular Democratic Organization, whereby Walmsley would resign as mayor before his term ended and Maestri would take his place as both mayor and as head of the powerful Old Regular political machine. In July 1936, Maestri was nominated as the Democratic candidate for mayor without opposition. After the Republican candidate withdrew in the face of almost certain defeat at the hands of a unified Longite-Old Regular machine, Maestri was acclaimed as mayor of New Orleans on August 17, 1936, without having to face election. A subsequent constitutional amendment was passed by the Longite state legislature cancelling the 1938 municipal election and extending Maestri's term to 1942.

== Mayor ==
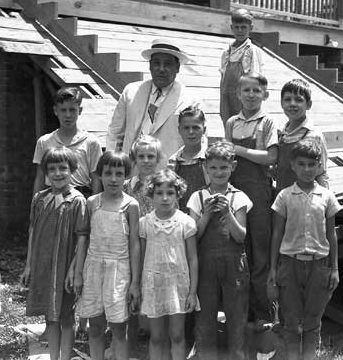
Maestri poses with children during a 1938 tour of Works Progress Administration projects around the city

Maestri graduated from Soule Business College. Maestri was a shrewd politician. He began the reintegration of New Orleans into the state's political structure by reorganizing the city's fiscal structure, ending the costly practice of borrowing money against anticipated tax revenue and streamlining purchasing and expenditures. He developed a popular personal governing style, going on daily tours of the city to pinpoint problems, and holding daily open sessions in which citizens could come to his office to explain their problems or request help. He used his connections with the Long machine in Baton Rouge to bring state and federal funds to the city, resulting in the construction of a new Charity Hospital and public housing projects for low-income New Orleanians. Once in City Hall, Maestri solidified his control by using spoils politics and patronage appointments, using Old Regular ward bosses to enforce loyalty and dispense patronage, and to guarantee votes for himself and for Longite candidates in local and state elections. With this powerful machine behind him, he was able to easily win reelection in 1942 against reform candidates Herve Racivitch and Shirley Wimberly, taking 75,713 votes out of a total of 137,000 votes cast.

After this easy victory, though, Maestri retreated from his accessible governing style in his second term in order to spend more time running his Old Regular machine, which allowed city services to erode. With the mayor's attention elsewhere, the corruption and favoritism that already characterized his administration grew even further. Maestri and the Longites had reached a deal with mobster Frank Costello whereby the city would ignore slot-machine laws in exchange for a cut of the proceeds, so prostitution and illegal gambling flourished in New Orleans under Maestri's tenure. The growing problems of New Orleans in Maestri's second term were too much for the Old Regular machine to handle, and allowed young reformer deLesseps Story Morrison Sr. to defeat Maestri in the mayoral election of January 1946. Morrison served until 1961.

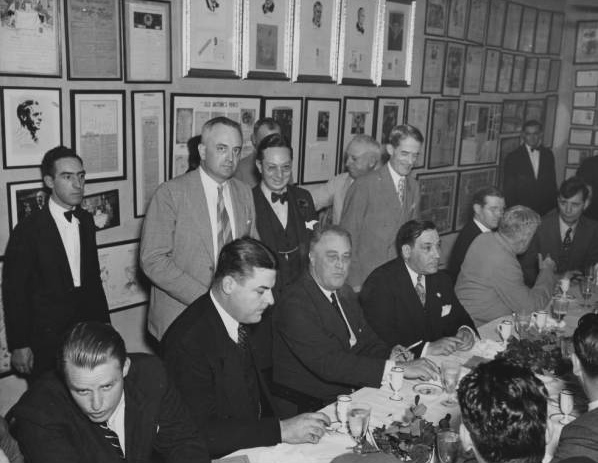
Maestri to the right of FDR at Antoine's

== Sources ==
- Haas, Edward F. "New Orleans on the Half-Shell: The Maestri Era, 1936-1946" Louisiana History, 13 (1972)
- Kurtz, Michael and Peoples, Morgan. Earl K. Long: The Saga of Uncle Earl and Louisiana Politics. LSU Press, 1990.
- Brasseaux, Carl, ed. A Dictionary of Louisiana Biography . Louisiana Historical Association, 1988.

Preceded by Jesse S. Cave (acting mayor)	Mayor of New Orleans; 1936–1946	Succeeded by deLesseps Story Morrison
