= Louisiana Political Museum and Hall of Fame =

Museum and hall of fame in Winnfield, Louisiana

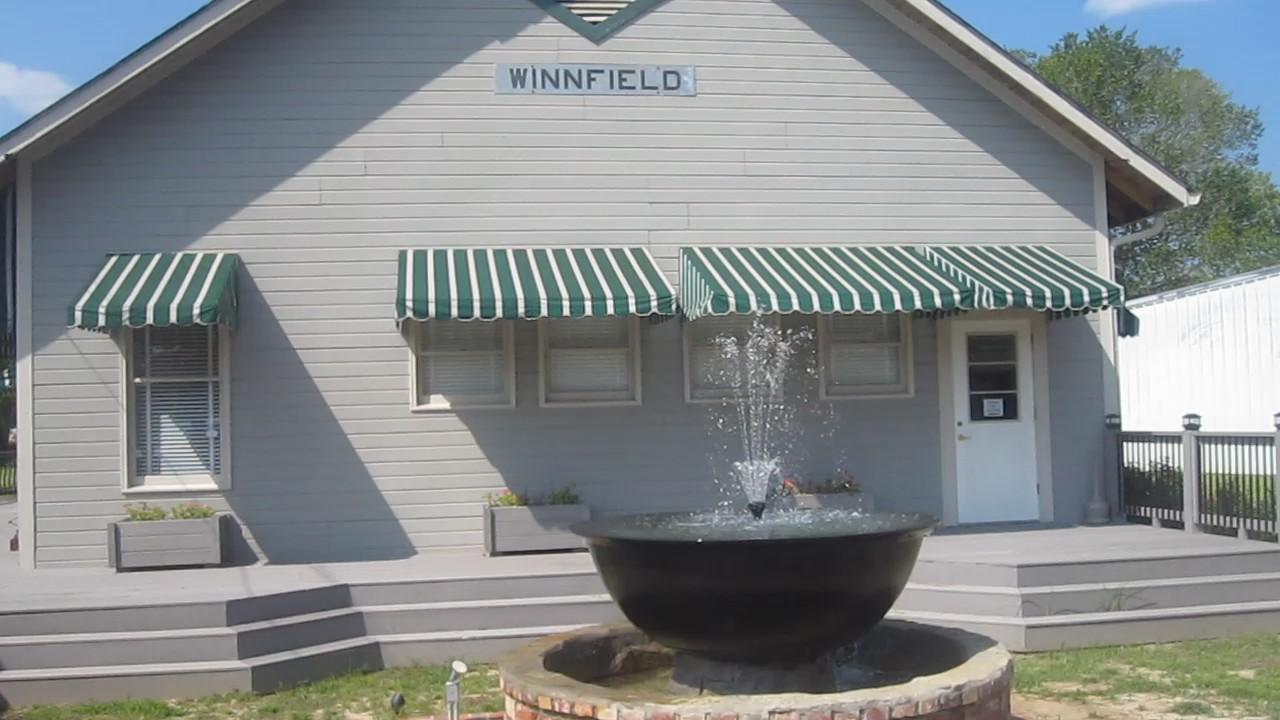

- Location within Louisiana
- Established: 1987
- Location: 498 E. Main Street, Winnfield, Louisiana
- Coordinates: 31.926776°N 92.635376°W
- Website: LPM Official Site

The Louisiana Political Museum and Hall of Fame is a museum and hall of fame located in Winnfield, Louisiana. Created by a 1987 act of the Louisiana State Legislature, it honors the best-known politicians and political journalists in the state.

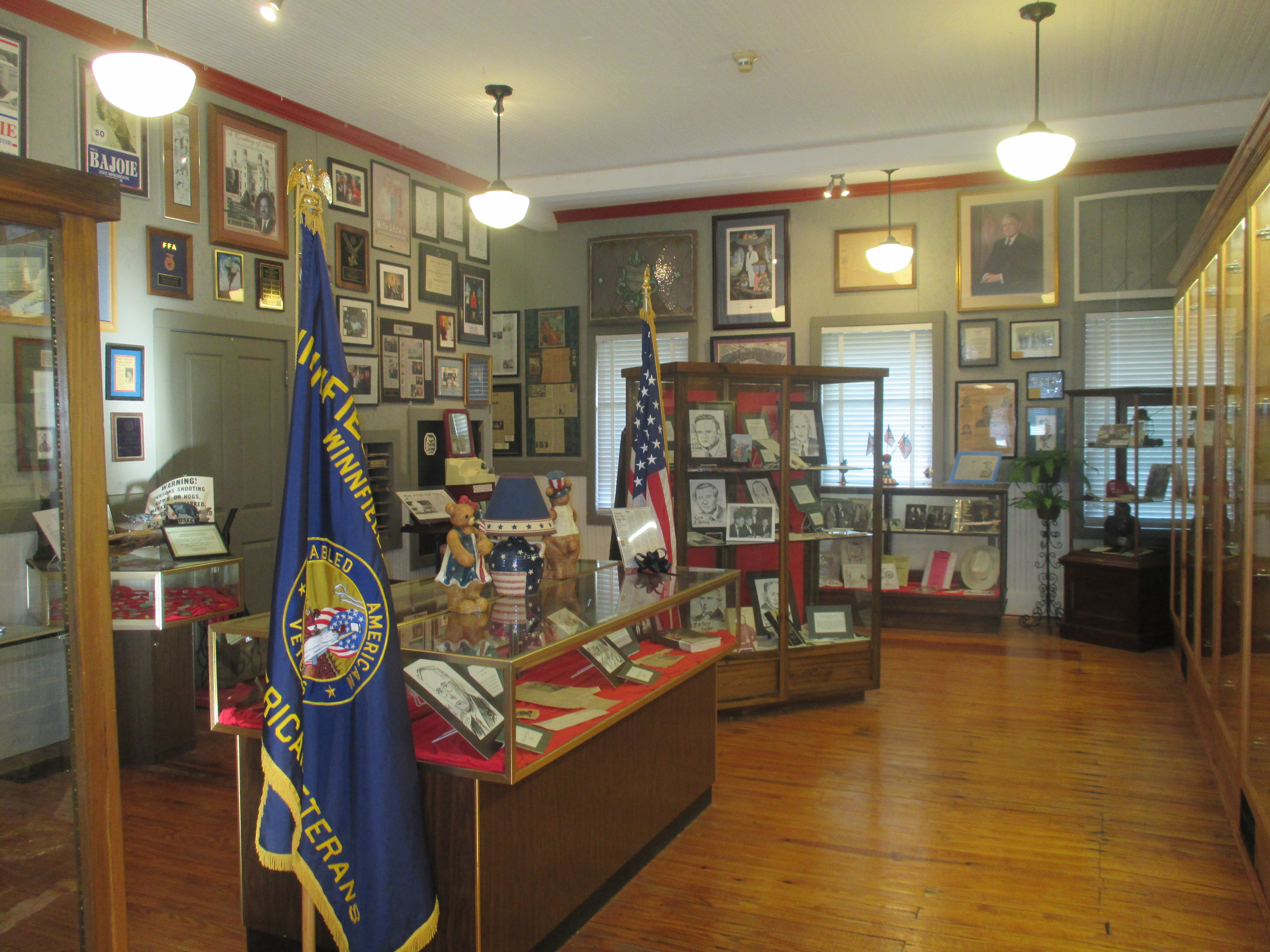
Inside the museum

== Hall of Fame inductees ==
Louisiana Political Museum and Hall of Fame
| Name | Image | Birth–death | Year | Area of achievement |
|---|---|---|---|---|
| John Alario | | (1943–) | 2003 | Former speaker of the Louisiana House of Representatives, 1984–1988; 1992–1996; Louisiana State Senate President, 2012-2020 |
| Avery Alexander | | (1910–1999) | 2018 | Louisiana state representative for Orleans Parish; figure in the civil rights movement |
| Rodney Alexander | | (1946–) | 2010 | Former U.S. representative for Louisiana's 5th congressional district, 2003–2013; secretary of the Louisiana Department of Veterans Affairs, 2013–2014; state representative for Jackson Parish, 1988–2002 |
| A. Leonard Allen | | (1891–1969) | 1994 | U.S. representative for Louisiana's 8th congressional district (since disbanded), 1937–1953 |
| Oscar K. Allen | | (1882–1936) | 1997 | Governor of Louisiana, 1932–1936 |
| Al Ater | | (1953–2017) | 2009 | State representative from Concordia Parish, 1984–1992; Acting Louisiana Secretary of State, 2005–2006 |
| Fred Baden | | (1934–2009) | 2012 | Mayor of Pineville, 1970–1998 |
| Diana Bajoie | | (1948–) | 2007 | State senator, 1991–2008; state representative, 1976–1991; temporary member of the New Orleans City Council, 2012–2013 |
| Richard Baker | | (1948–) | 2008 | Lobbyist; U.S. Representative for Louisiana's 6th congressional district, 1987–2008; state representative from Baton Rouge, 1972–1987 |
| Jesse Bankston | | (1907–2010) | 2002 | Former member, secretary, and chairman of the Louisiana State Board of Elementary and Secondary Education |
| Charles C. Barham | | (1934–2010) | 2013 | Louisiana State Senator, 1964–1972; 1976–1988 |
| Robert W. Bates | | (1941–2020) | 2005 | United States Secret Service agent who accompanied President Richard M. Nixon to China; operates commercial horticultural nursery in Forest Hill in Rapides Parish |
| Louis Berry | | (1914–1998) | 1996 | African American civil rights attorney from Alexandria, Dean of Southern University Law Center from 1972 to 1974 |
| Kathleen Babineaux Blanco | | (1942–2019) | 2006 | Governor of Louisiana, 2004–2008; Lieutenant Governor of Louisiana, 1996–2004; Louisiana Public Service Commissioner, 1989–1996; state representative from Lafayette, 1984–1989 |
| Raymond Blanco | | (1935–2022) | 2019 | Academic administrator and football coach; "First Gentleman of Louisiana", 2004–2008, while his wife, Kathleen, was governor |
| Hale Boggs | | (1914–1972) | 1993 | U.S. representative for Louisiana's 2nd congressional district, 1947–1973; Majority Leader of the United States House of Representatives, 1971–1973; House Majority Whip, 1962–1971 |
| Lindy Boggs | | (1916–2013) | 1994 | U.S. representative for Louisiana's 2nd congressional district, 1973–1991]; United States Ambassador to the Holy See, 1997–2001 |
| Billy Boles | | (1927–2008) | 2004 | Louisiana state senator from Ouachita and Richland parishes, 1952–1956 |
| Kenny Bowen | | (1926–2002) | 2002 | Mayor of Lafayette, 1972–1980; 1992–1996 |
| Harley Bozeman | | (1891–1971) | 2002 | Historian, state representative, 1929–1930; political crony of Huey Long |
| John Breaux | | (1944–) | 2003 | United States Senator, 1987 to 2005; U.S. Representative from Louisiana's 7th congressional district, 1972–1987 |
| James H. Brown | | (1940–) | 2011 | Political consultant; state senator from Concordia Parish, 1972–1980; Louisiana secretary of state, 1980–1988; Louisiana insurance commissioner, 1991–2000 |
| J. Marshall Brown | | (1926–1995) | 2014 | State representative from Orleans Parish, 1952–1960; Democratic national committeeman, 1964 to 1972; member of Louisiana State Board of Education, 1960s |
| Peppi Bruneau | | (1942–) | 2015 | Republican member of the Louisiana House of Representatives from Orleans Parish, 1976–2007 |
| Victor Bussie | | (1919–2011) | 1994 | President, Louisiana AFL–CIO, 1956–1997 |
| Buddy Caldwell | | (1946–) | 2015 | Attorney General of Louisiana, 2008–2016; former district attorney in Madison Parish, 1979–2008 |
| Jefferson Caffery | | (1886–1974) | 2000 | Diplomat |
| Burl Cain | | (1942–) | 2002 | Warden, Louisiana State Penitentiary, 1995–2016; founder of Louisiana State Penitentiary Museum |
| Foster Campbell | | (1947–) | 2009 | State Senator, 1976–2003; member of the Louisiana Public Service Commission since 2003; candidate for governor, 2007 and U.S. Senator, 2016 |
| James Carville | | (1944–) | 1996 | Manager of Bill Clinton's Presidential campaigns, television news media commentator |
| Leonard J. Chabert | | (1932–1991) | 2013 | State representative, 1972–1980; state senator from Terrebonne and Lafourche parishes, 1980–1991 |
| Marty James Chabert | | (1956–) | 2013 | State senator from Terrebonne and Lafourche parishes from 1992 to 1996 |
| Norby Chabert | | (1975–) | 2013 | State senator from Terrebonne and Lafourche parishes since 2009 |
| Jay Chevalier | | (1936–2019) | 2003 | Singer and political candidate |
| William C.C. Claiborne | | (c. 1772–1817) | 1993 | First Governor of Louisiana, as well as Governor of the Territory of Orleans |
| Sally Clausen | | (1945–) | 2007 | Former Louisiana Commissioner of Higher Education Also served as Adjunct Professor for Louisiana State University, Deputy Commissioner of Administration, Secretary of Education for the Office of the Governor, and President of Southeastern Louisiana University. |
| Hyram Copeland | | (1940–) | 2013 | Mayor of Vidalia, 1992–2016 |
| Harry Connick, Sr. | | (1926–2024) | 2003 | District attorney of Orleans Parish, 1973–2003; investigated the assassination of John F. Kennedy; father of singer Harry Connick Jr. |
| Charlie Cook | | (1953–) | 2006 | Political analyst |
| Jay Dardenne | | (1954–) | 2018 | Lieutenant governor of Louisiana, 2010–2016; Louisiana secretary of state, 2006–2010; state senator from Baton Rouge, 1992–2006; Louisiana Commissioner of Administration, since 2016 |
| Quentin Dastugue | | (1955–) | 2018 | Louisiana State Representative for Orleans and Jefferson parishes, 1980–1996 |
| Jimmie Davis | | (1899–2000) | 1993 | Governor of Louisiana |
| Pap Dean | | (1915–2011) | 1993 | Editorial cartoonist, Shreveport Times |
| Charles deGravelles | | (1913–2008) | 2007 | Chair, state Republican Party, 1968–1972 |
| Virginia deGravelles | | (1915–2017) | 2007 | Republican National Committeewoman (1964–1968) |
| George Dement | | (1922–2014) | 2013 | Mayor, Bossier City, 1989–2005 |
| Charles W. DeWitt Jr. | | (1947–) | 2004 | Speaker of the Louisiana House of Representatives, 2000–2004 |
| Juba Diez | | (1944–) | 2015 | State representative for Ascension Parish from 1976 to 2004 |
| Jimmy Dimos | | (1938–2023) | 2017 | State representative (1976–1999), House Speaker (1988–1992), and district judge (1999–2006) from Monroe |
| Bill Dodd | | (1909–1991) | 2002 | Louisiana state representative, 1940–1948; lieutenant governor, 1948–1952; state superintendent of education, 1964–1972 |
| Cat Doucet | | (1899–1975) | 1999 | Sheriff of St. Landry Parish, Huey Long protégé |
| Hunt Downer | | (1946–) | 2007 | State representative |
| Edwin Edwards | | (1927–2021) | 1993 | Governor of Louisiana, 1972–80, 1984–88, 1992–96; U.S. Representative, 1965-72 |
| John Bel Edwards | | (1966–) | 2014 | Governor of Louisiana, 2016–24; former member of the Louisiana House of Representatives for Tangipahoa Parish; 56th Governor of Louisiana; part of the Edwards political family given group induction |
| Allen J. Ellender | | (1890–1972) | 1994 | United States senator |
| Noble Ellington | | (1942–) | 2015 | Member of both houses of the Louisiana State Legislature from Franklin Parish; Winnsboro cotton merchant and deputy state insurance commissioner |
| Randy Ewing | | (1944–) | 2010 | State senator |
| Jimmy Fitzmorris | | (1921–2021) | 1999 | Lieutenant Governor of Louisiana, 1972–1980 |
| Carlos Roberto Flores | | (1950–) | 2005 | President of Honduras |
| Mary Flake Flores | | | 2005 | First Lady of Honduras, humanitarian worker |
| Murphy J. Foster | | (1849–1921) | 1997 | Governor of Louisiana, 1892–1900 |
| Murphy J. Foster Jr. | | (1930–2020) | 2003 | Governor of Louisiana, 1996–2004 |
| John B. Fournet | | (1895–1984) | 2014 | Louisiana Supreme Court chief justice, speaker of the Louisiana House of Representatives, Lieutenant Governor of Louisiana |
| Douglas Fowler | | (1906–1980) | 1999 | Louisiana Elections Commissioner, 1959–1979 |
| Robert "Bobby" Freeman | | (1934–2016) | 2008 | Lieutenant governor of Louisiana, 1980–1988 |
| Sylvan Friedman | | (1908–1979) | 2006 | Louisiana state Senator and Representative |
| Charles Fuselier | | (1942–) | 2003 | Sheriff of Saint Martin Parish, President of the Louisiana Sheriff's Association, National Sheriff of the Year in 1996 |
| Ron Gomez | | (1934–2022) | 2019 | Louisiana State Representative for Lafayette Parish from 1980 to 1989; print and broadcast journalist |
| Lucille May Grace | | (1900–1957) | 2011 | Louisiana Register of the State Land Office, 1932, first woman to attain statewide elected office in Louisiana |
| Camille Gravel | | (1915–2005) | 1995 | Attorney, executive counsel to Governors John McKeithen and Edwin Edwards, helped draft the current Louisiana Constitution |
| Francis Grevemberg | | (1914–2008) | 2002 | Louisiana state police superintendent |
| Dick Guidry | | (1929–2014) | 2014 | Considered the youngest member ever elected to the Louisiana House of Representatives |
| Dudley A. Guglielmo | | (1909–2005) | 2004 | Louisiana Commissioner of Insurance |
| John Hainkel | | (1938–2005) | 2002 | Louisiana state representative |
| Sam Hanna | | (1933–2006) | 1995 | Journalist |
| Paul Hardy | | (1942–) | 2019 | Lieutenant Governor of Louisiana from 1988 to 1992; former Louisiana Secretary of State and state senator from St. Martin Parish |
| Leonard R. "Pop" Hataway | | (1939–2021) | 2013 | Sheriff of Grant Parish, 1976–2008; member of Louisiana Board of Pardons and Paroles |
| Felix Edward Hébert | | (1901–1979) | 2012 | United States House of Representatives |
| E. L. Henry | | (1936–2025) | 2012 | Speaker of the Louisiana House of Representatives, 1972-80 |
| Wiley W. Hilburn | | (1938–2014) | 2001 | Journalist and chairman of the Department of Journalism at Louisiana Tech University |
| Donald E. Hines | | (1933–2019) | 2006 | Louisiana State Senate President from 2004 to 2008; physician in Bunkie |
| Melvin "Kip" Holden | | (1952–) | 2008 | Democratic Mayor-President of East Baton Rouge Parish, 2005–2016 |
| Jerry Huckaby | | (1941–) | 2012 | United States House of Representatives for Louisiana's 5th congressional district, 1977–1993 |
| John S. Hunt, II | | (1928–2001) | 2014 | Member of the Louisiana Public Service Commission, 1964–1972; nephew of Huey and Earl Long; cousin of Russell B. Long |
| Carolyn Huntoon | | (1940–) | 2003 | Director Johnson Space Center, Agency Representative at the White House in the Office of Science and Technology Policy, Assistant Secretary at the U.S. Department of Energy Sister of former U.S. Representative Buddy Leach |
| Richard Ieyoub | | (1944–2023) | 2016 | Attorney General of Louisiana, 1992–2004 |
| William J. Jefferson | | (1947–) | 2000 | U.S. Representative for Louisiana's 2nd congressional district, 1991–2009 |
| T.J. Jemison | | (1918–2013) | 2017 | Civil rights activist from Baton Rouge; early organizer of Southern Christian Leadership Conference |
| Chris John | | (1960–) | 2009 | U.S. representative for Louisiana's 7th congressional district (since disbanded), 1997–2005; lost the 2004 U.S. Senate election to David Vitter |
| J. Bennett Johnston Jr. | | (1932–2025) | 1997 | United States senator, 1972–1997 |
| Sam Houston Jones | | (1897–1978) | 2016 | Governor of Louisiana, 1940–1944 |
| Theodore "Ted" Jones | | (1934–2019) | 2007 | Lawyer, lobbyist, political appointee |
| Eddie J. Jordan Jr. | | (1952–) | 2005 | District attorney of Orleans Parish, 2003–2007 |
| James A. Joseph | | (1935–2023) | 2008 | Career diplomat and professor of the Practice of Public Policy Studies at Duke University |
| Curtis Joubert | | (1931–2020) | 2005 | Mayor of Eunice, 1981–1994; state representative for St. Landry Parish, 1968–1972; former member of the Louisiana Public Service Commission and the Board of Trustees for Colleges and Universities |
| Donald G. Kelly | | (1941–) | 2008 | State senator from Natchitoches, 1976–1996 |
| Iris Kelso | | (1926–2003) | 1999 | Journalist |
| Robert F. Kennon | | (1902–1988) | 2001 | Governor of Louisiana, 1952–1956 |
| Catherine D. Kimball | | (1945–) | 2011 | Chief justice of the Louisiana Supreme Court, 2009–2013; associate justice, 1992–2009 |
| Jeannette Knoll | | (1943–) | 2000 | Associate justice, Louisiana Supreme Court, 1997–2016 |
| Adras LaBorde | | (1912–1993) | 2012 | Editor and columnist for The Alexandria Daily Town Talk |
| Raymond Laborde | | (1927–2016) | 2003 | State representative from Avoyelles Parish and mayor of Marksville |
| Charles D. Lancaster Jr. | | (1943–2018) | 2018 | Louisiana state representative for Jefferson Parish, 1972–1976; 1980–2008; longest-serving Republican member of the state House |
| Mary Landrieu | | (1955–) | 2007 | United States Senator 1997–2014; state treasurer, 1987–1996; state representative, 1980–1988 |
| Moon Landrieu | | (1930–2022) | 2004 | United States Secretary of Housing and Urban Development, 1979–1981; Mayor of New Orleans, 1970–1978; state representative, 1960–1966 Mayor of New Orleans |
| John LaPlante | | (1953–2007) | 2008 | Baton Rouge–based journalist |
| Dudley LeBlanc | | (1894–1971) | 1993 | Louisiana state senator |
| Harry Lee | | (1932–2007) | 2001 | Sheriff of Jefferson Parish, 1980-2007; father of current Jefferson Parish president Cynthia Lee-Sheng |
| Walter Lee | | (1921–2015) | 2009 | Evangeline Parish Clerk of Court, 1956–2012 |
| Bob Livingston | | (1943–) | 2003 | United States House of Representatives |
| Earl Long | | (1895–1960) | 1993 | Governor of Louisiana |
| Gillis William Long | | (1923–1985) | 1994 | United States House of Representatives from Louisiana's 8th congressional district, 1963–1965; 1973–1985 |
| Huey P. Long | | (1893–1935) | 1993 | Governor of Louisiana; United States Senator |
| Jimmy D. Long | | (1931–2016) | 2000 | Louisiana State Representative from Natchitoches |
| Rose McConnell Long | | (1892–1970) | 2014 | U.S. Senator upon the death of her husband, Huey P. Long; mother of U.S. Senator Russell B. Long |
| Russell B. Long | | (1918–2003) | 1993 | United States Senator |
| Speedy Long | | (1928–2006) | 1998 | United States House of Representatives |
| Bill Lynch | | (1929–2004) | 2005 | Louisiana Inspector General, investigative journalist in Shreveport and Baton Rouge |
| Edward "Bubby" Lyons | | (1929–2021) | 2014 | First person to serve as mayor of two Louisiana cities, Houma and Mandeville |
| Charlton Lyons | | (1894–1973) | 2010 | Chair, state Republican Party, candidate for governor, 1964 |
| John Maginnis | | (1948–2014) | 2015 | Louisiana journalist who exposed corruption in politics and government; known for the book The Last Hayride |
| Robert Mann | | (1958–) | 2014 | Manship Chair in Journalism at Louisiana State University; aide to U.S. Sens. Russell Long and John Breaux; communications director, Gov. Kathleen Blanco; political historian |
| Wade O. Martin Jr. | | (1911–1990) | 2001 | Louisiana Secretary of State |
| Charles A. Marvin | | (1929–2003) | 2015 | District attorney of Bossier and Webster parishes, judge of the Louisiana Second Circuit Court of Appeal; attorney in Minden |
| John McKeithen | | (1918–1999) | 1993 | Governor of Louisiana, 1964–1972; former member of the Louisiana Public Service Commission and Louisiana House of Representatives |
| W. Fox McKeithen | | (1946–2005) | 2006 | Louisiana Secretary of State |
| Harold McSween | | (1926–2002) | 2001 | U.S. Representative from Louisiana's 8th congressional district, 1958–1963 |
| Billy Montgomery | | (1937–2025) | 2012 | Former Louisiana State Representative from Bossier Parish |
| W. Henson Moore, III | | (1939–) | 2002 | United States Representative from Louisiana's 6th congressional district, 1975–1987 |
| Ernest Nathan Morial | | (1929–1989) | 1993 | Mayor of New Orleans |
| deLesseps Story Morrison Sr. | | (1912–1964) | 1995 | Mayor of New Orleans, 1946–1962; three-time candidate for governor |
| Edgar G. "Sonny" Mouton Jr. | | (1929–2016) | 2004 | Louisiana state senator from Lafayette |
| J. Kelly Nix | | (1934–2020) | 2011 | Louisiana Superintendent of Education, 1976–1984 |
| Dave Norris | | (1942–) | 2017 | Mayor of West Monroe, 1978–2018 |
| Samuel B. Nunez Jr. | | (1930–2012) | 2010 | State senator from St. Bernard Parish |
| William "Billy" Nungesser | | (1929–2006) | 2010 | Chair, state Republican Party |
| Sean O'Keefe | | (1956–) | 2007 | Administrator of NASA |
| Bob Odom | | (1935–2014) | 2008 | Louisiana Commissioner of Agriculture and Forestry, 1980–2008 |
| Jessel Ourso | | (1932–1978) | 2009 | Sheriff of Iberville Parish |
| John H. Overton | | (1875–1948) | 1998 | United States Senator |
| Mary Evelyn Parker | | (1920–2015) | 1996 | First woman to serve as Louisiana State Treasurer, 1968–1987 |
| Harvey Peltier Jr. | | (1923–1980) | 2014 | Louisiana state senator from Lafourche and Terrebonne parishes, 1964–1976; first president of the University of Louisiana System trustees, 1975–1980 |
| Leander Perez | | (1891–1969) | 1996 | Political boss |
| Ralph Perlman | | (1917–2013) | 2011 | State budget director |
| Cecil J. Picard | | (1938–2007) | 2006 | State Superintendent of Education, 1996–2007; state senator, 1979–1996; state representative, 1976–1979 |
| Albin Provosty | | (1865–1932) | 2015 | Member of the Louisiana State Senate from Pointe Coupee Parish from 1912 to 1920; district attorney and newspaper publisher; member of the Scott family |
| Ned Randolph | | (1942–2016) | 2008 | Mayor of Alexandria, 1986–2006; state senator, 1976–1984; state representative, 1972–1976 |
| Benjamin Burras "Sixty" Rayburn | | (1916–2008) | 1993 | Louisiana State Senator from Washington Parish |
| Edmund Reggie | | (1926–2013) | 2004 | City judge in Crowley who spearheaded the state's Presidential campaign for John F. Kennedy; his daughter Victoria Reggie Kennedy is the widow of U.S. Senator Edward M. Kennedy |
| Ed Renwick | | (1938–2020) | 1999 | Retired director of Loyola University Institute of Politics |
| Doris Lindsey Holland Rhodes | | (1909–1997) | 2004 | State representative and state senator |
| Buddy Roemer | | (1943–2021) | 2000 | Governor of Louisiana, 1988–1992; U.S. Representative for Louisiana's 4th congressional district, 1981–1988 |
| Angelo Roppolo | | (1920–2012) | 2013 | Political consultant in Shreveport |
| Joe R. Salter | | (1943–) | 2008 | former Speaker of the Louisiana House of Representatives |
| Joe Sampite | | (1931–2012) | 2002 | Mayor of Natchitoches |
| Victor H. Schiro | | (1904–1992) | 2001 | Mayor of New Orleans, 1962–1970 |
| Melinda Schwegmann | | (1946–) | 1997 | First woman Lieutenant Governor of Louisiana, 1992–1996 |
| Jock Scott | | (1947–2009) | 2015 | Member of the Louisiana House of Representatives from Alexandria who worked for the four-year status of Louisiana State University at Alexandria |
| Nauman Scott | | (1916–2001) | 2015 | Judge of the United States District Court for the Western District of Louisiana, based in Alexandria; ordered extensive busing in 1981 to compel racial integration of public schools |
| Virginia Shehee | | (1923–2015) | 2004 | Louisiana State Senator from District 38 (Caddo and De Soto parishes), 1976–1980 |
| Barbara Boggs Sigmund | | (1939–1990) | 2005 | Mayor of Princeton, New Jersey; daughter of Hale and Lindy Boggs |
| Charlie Smith | | (1942–2012) | 2011 | Lobbyist |
| Richard Stalder | | (1951–) | 2003 | Secretary Louisiana Department of Public Safety and Corrections from 1992 to 2008 |
| Vic Stelly | | (1941–2020) | 2006 | State representative for Calcasieu Parish, 1988–2004; member of the Louisiana Board of Regents, 2007–2011 |
| Raymond Strother | | (1940–2022) | 2013 | Regional and national Democratic political consultant, formerly based in Baton Rouge |
| Billy Tauzin | | (1943–) | 2003 | U.S. representative from Louisiana's 3rd congressional district, 1980–2005 |
| Patrick F. Taylor | | (1937–2004) | 2009 | Businessman |
| Zachary Taylor | | (1784–1850) | 1995 | President of the United States, 1849–1850 |
| Francis C. Thompson | | (1941–) | 2005 | State senator from Richland Parish; former state representative |
| David Treen | | (1928–2009) | 1997 | Governor of Louisiana, 1980–1984; U.S. representative for Louisiana's 3rd congressional district, 1973–1980 |
| Risley C. Triche | | (1927–2012) | 2010 | State representative from Assumption Parish, 1955–1976 |
| Joe Waggonner | | (1918–2007) | 1998 | U.S. representative from Louisiana's 4th congressional district, 1961–1979 |
| Lillian W. Walker | | (1923–2016) | 2002 | Louisiana State Representative from East Baton Rouge Parish, 1964–1972 |
| Jack Wardlaw | | (1937–2012) | 2004 | Journalist; bureau chief in Baton Rouge of the New Orleans Times-Picayune (1980–2002) |
| Gus Weill | | (1933–2018) | 1996 | Radio host, writer, political consultant |
| T. Harry Williams | | (1909–1979) | 1998 | 1970 Pulitzer Prize for Biography or Autobiography for Huey Long (1969) |
| Edward Douglass White | | (1844–1921) | 1995 | Chief Justice of the United States, 1910–1921 |
| Richard Zuschlag | | (1948–2024) | 2019 | Founder of Acadian Ambulance in Lafayette |

== See also ==
- Louisiana Center for Women and Government Hall of Fame
- Old Louisiana State Capitol
