= Tammy Mercure =

American photographer

- Born: January 19, 1976 (age 50); Sioux City, Iowa
- Education: East Tennessee State University
- Known for: Photography

Tammy Mercure (born 1976) is an American photographer based in Violet, Louisiana. In 2012, Mercure was named one of Oxford American magazine's 100 New Superstars of Southern Art.

== Early life and education ==
Mercure received a Bachelor of Fine Arts from Columbia College Chicago in 1999 and a Master of Fine Arts from East Tennessee State University in 2009.

== Photography ==
Mercure is best known for her photographs of the Southeastern United States. Her work has been featured on VICE, CNN Photos, and Place, Art, and Self (2004) by geographer Yi-Fu Tuan.

=== Cavaliers ===
The series Cavaliers (2008-2014) consists of photographs of people and events throughout Tennessee, Virginia, North Carolina, South Carolina, Kentucky, and Georgia.

== Selected bibliography ==
- Place, Art, and Self. 2004. University of Virginia Press, Santa Fe, NM, in association with Columbia College, Chicago, IL. ISBN 1-930066-24-4.
