= Bussi =

Bussi is a surname. Notable people with the surname include:

- Antonio Domingo Bussi (1926–2011), Argentine Army general and politician
- Brandon Bussi (born 1998), American professional ice hockey goaltender
- Carlo Antonio Bussi (1658–1690), Swiss painter
- Giovanni Andrea Bussi (1417–1475), Italian Renaissance humanist and bishop
- Giovanni Battista Bussi (disambiguation), multiple people
- Hortensia Bussi (1914–2009), widow of assassinated Chilean president Salvador Allende and political exile
- Michel Bussi (born 1965), French writer, political analyst and professor of geography
- Ricardo Bussi (born 1964), Argentine politician
- Vittoria Bussi (born 1987), Italian professional racing cyclist

== See also ==
- Bussie
