= Richard A. Tonry =

American politician (1935–2012)

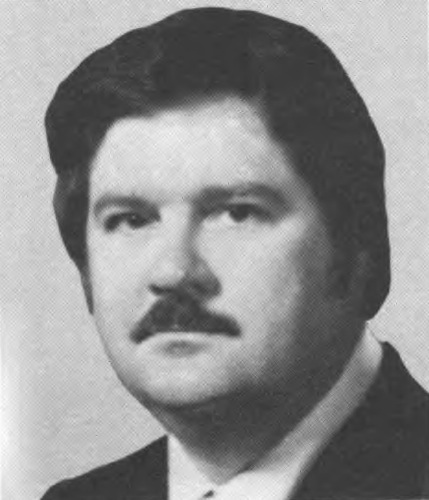

Member of the U.S. House of Representatives from Louisiana's 1st district
- In office January 3, 1977 – May 4, 1977
- Preceded by: F. Edward Hébert
- Succeeded by: Bob Livingston

Member of the Louisiana House of Representatives from the 103rd district
- In office January 1976 – December 1976
- Preceded by: Elmer R. Tapper
- Succeeded by: Edward Bopp

Personal details
- Born: Richard Alvin Tonry; June 25, 1935 New Orleans, Louisiana, U.S.
- Died: July 3, 2012 (aged 77) Lumberton, Mississippi, U.S.
- Resting place: St. Bernard Memorial Gardens in Chalmette, Louisiana
- Party: Democratic
- Education: Spring Hill College (BA, MA); Georgetown University; Loyola University New Orleans (JD)

Richard Alvin Tonry (June 25, 1935 – July 3, 2012) was an American politician. A member of the Democratic Party, he served in the United States House of Representatives for Louisiana's 1st congressional district for a partial term in 1977.

== Education ==
He graduated in 1962 from Spring Hill College in Mobile, Alabama. In 1967, he earned a Juris Doctor degree from Loyola University New Orleans College of Law. He practiced law in the New Orleans area for almost a decade before being elected to the Louisiana House of Representatives in the first-ever nonpartisan blanket primary held at the state level in the fall of 1975.

== Politics ==
He served a year (1976) in Louisiana House District 103. In the state House, he was an unabashed supporter of organized labor and was particularly close to Louisiana AFL-CIO leader Victor Bussie. Tonry led the push to kill a right-to-work bill in the 1976 legislative session, but those efforts failed and the bill became law without the signature of Governor Edwin W. Edwards, who, like Tonry, was a strong supporter of organized labor and close friend of Bussie's. Thus, Louisiana became the last Southern state to adopt a right-to-work bill.

Shortly after taking his state House seat, Tonry declared his candidacy for the United States Congress from Louisiana's 1st congressional district after the 36-year Democratic incumbent, F. Edward Hébert, announced his retirement. In the Democratic primary, Tonry upset New Orleans City Councilman James Moreau, then narrowly defeated Republican Bob Livingston, an assistant state attorney general, in the general election. It was one of the last congressional elections held before Louisiana adopted its nonpartisan blanket primary for such elections in 1978.

=== Allegations and conviction ===
Tonry was investigated by U.S. Attorney Gerald J. Gallinghouse on charges of allowing subordinates to steal votes by stuffing ballot boxes in St. Bernard Parish, a suburb of New Orleans. He was also charged with receiving illegal campaign funds beyond the $1,000 federal limit then imposed per contribution.

These allegations ultimately led to his resignation, his guilty pleas of campaign-finance irregularities, and a six-month prison sentence at the Federal Prison Camp in Montgomery, Alabama.

=== Resignation ===
When Tonry resigned from Congress after four months in the office, a special election was called in August 1977. Tonry ran in the Democratic primary for that race, but lost to one of his former colleagues in the state legislature, Ron Faucheux, who was defeated by Livingston in the special election. This seat has remained in Republican hands since that time and is currently held by Steve Scalise after formerly being held by David Vitter and Bobby Jindal.

In 1983, Tonry tried to return to the Louisiana House in District 103, but finished in fourth (dead last) in the nonpartisan blanket primary with 2,693 votes (17.8 percent). Victory went to the Republican Edward Ripoll, who defeated incumbent Edward S. Bopp in a runoff election. Bopp had succeeded Tonry in the state House in 1977.

== Death ==
Tonry died of natural causes in 2012 at the age of 77 and is interred at St. Bernard Memorial Gardens in Chalmette, Louisiana.

== See also ==
- List of American federal politicians convicted of crimes

Louisiana House of Representatives
Preceded by Elmer R. Tapper	Member of the Louisiana House of Representatives from the 103rd congressional district 1976	Succeeded by Edward Bopp
U.S. House of Representatives
Preceded by Felix Edward Hebert	Member of the U.S. House of Representatives from Louisiana's 1st congressional district 1977	Succeeded by Bob Livingston
