= Bussie =

Bussie is a surname. Notable people with the surname include:

- Asya Bussie (born 1991), American basketball player
- Landon Bussie (born c. 1988), American basketball coach
- Victor Bussie (1919–2011), American labor leader and politician

== See also ==
- Bussi
- Busse
