= Ed Renwick =

American political commentator and pollster

Edward Renwick (June 26, 1938-March 6, 2020) was a political commentator, professor, and pollster who specialized in Louisiana politics. In 1999 he was inducted into the Louisiana Political Hall of Fame.

== Early life and education ==
Edward Francis Renwick was born in Joliet, Illinois in 1939 and raised in the Chicago area. He graduated from Georgetown University and received master’s and doctoral degrees from the University of Arizona.

== Career ==
Prior to completing his doctoral thesis, Renwick taught at the University of Southwestern Louisiana. After receiving his PhD in Tucson, he returned to Louisiana, working for Governor John McKeithen and teaching at the University of New Orleans. In 1968, Renwick became a political science professor at Loyola University New Orleans. He was a political analyst at WWL-TV from 1979 through 2008. In 1986, he appeared on C-SPAN discussing Louisiana politics. During the course of his career, Renwick became a respected pollster and was consulted by numerous Louisiana politicians, including Edwin Edwards, Dutch Morial, Jimmy Fitzmorris, Billy Tauzin, Harry Connick Sr. and Moon Landrieu. A lecture series at Loyola University is named in his honor.

== Personal life ==
Renwick was married to Polly Renwick. He collected American and African art. Renwick died March 6, 2020.
