= Ralph Perlman =

Ralph R. Perlman
- Born: May 16, 1917; New York City, US
- Died: May 24, 2013 (aged 96); Baton Rouge, Louisiana
- Education: Cornell University; Columbia University
- Occupations: Businessman; Government official

Ralph R. Perlman (May 16, 1917 – May 24, 2013) was the state budget director in his adopted U.S. state of Louisiana, having served under four governors of both parties from 1967 until 1988. Thereafter, Perlman continued to hold other public service positions.

Perlman was born in New York City, the only son of a Jewish couple of European descent, Harry and Bessie Perlman. He received his undergraduate degree from Cornell University in Ithaca, New York, and a master's in business from Columbia University in New York City. During World War II, Perlman served with distinction in the European Theater as an artillery officer with the United States Army 63rd Infantry Division. While stationed at Camp Van Dorn in Mississippi, he met and subsequently married the former Carol Herzberg, who was also Jewish. The Perlmans established residence in Baton Rouge, where he was first engaged in business. Carol Perlman died of cancer in 1981; in 1984, Perlman remarried.

In 1964, Governor John McKeithen appointed Perlman as the executive assistant to the commissioner of administration, W. W. McDougall. In 1966, he briefly joined the staff of then-State Representative J. Bennett Johnston Jr., a Shreveport lawyer, who subsequently became a state senator in 1968 and a U.S. senator in 1972. In 1967, Governor McKeithen named Perlman as state budget director. In that capacity he developed the Office of State Group Benefits, which handles the medical claims of state employees and retirees. He also oversaw the state's $5 million investment in the 1984 Louisiana World Exposition held in New Orleans.

In 1988, Perlman became the special assistant for finance under Governors Buddy Roemer, Edwin Edwards, and Murphy J. Foster Jr. In 1997, Foster appointed Perlman secretary of the Louisiana Gaming Control Board, a position that he held for five years.

In 2002, then University of Louisiana System President Sally Clausen hired him as a special assistant. According to Clausen, whom Perlman considered his "goddaughter", Perlman "treated every budget as though it was coming out of his own pocket. ... If I was running the state, I'd want Ralph Perlman watching my dollars. ... In the first year [as executive assistant], he saved me a million dollars from minor stuff. He was a magician in common sense." Son Gerald Lee "Jerry" Perlman (born c. 1947) of Shreveport, Louisiana, described his father as "very detail-oriented, and he always had all the facts at his fingertips. He had a very retentive memory."

Perlman died in a Baton Rouge hospice at the age of ninety-six after a brief illness.

In 2011, Perlman was inducted into the Louisiana Political Museum and Hall of Fame in Winnfield.
