= Pap Dean =

American political cartoonist, author and illustrator

- Born: Preston Allen Dean Jr. August 25, 1915; Colfax, Louisiana, U.S.
- Died: August 15, 2011 (aged 95)
- Education: Louisiana State University
- Occupations: Political cartoonist, author, illustrator

Preston Allen Dean Jr. (August 25, 1915 – August 15, 2011) was an American political cartoonist, author, and illustrator in Louisiana known as Pap Dean. He was inducted into the Louisiana Political Hall of Fame in 1993.

== Life and career ==
Dean was born in Colfax, Louisiana to Preston Allen Dean Sr. and Addie Swafford Dean. He attended Colfax High School. He graduated from Louisiana State University in 1937. He also studied at Chicago Art Institute.

Dean served in the military during World War II, retiring from the U.S. Army Reserves as a Lieutenant Colonel.

Dean worked for the Shreveport Times from 1938 until his retirement in 1979. He wrote and illustrated books on Louisiana, Natchitoches, Central Louisiana, and Colfax, Louisiana. He married and had children.

== Death and legacy ==
Dean died on August 15, 2011, at the age of 95.

LSU Shreveport has a collection of his cartoons.

== Books ==
- Louisiana: A Political History in Cartoon and Narrative
- Historic Natchitoches
- Beauty of the Cane
- Central Louisiana Historical Homesteads and the Families Who Touched Them
- Colfax: Its Place in Louisiana
