= Elmer R. Tapper =

American politician (1929–2011)

Elmer Robert "E. T." Tapper, Sr.

Louisiana State Representative for St. Bernard Parish
- In office 1960–1964
- Preceded by: August J. Campagna
- Succeeded by: Sammy Nunez

Louisiana State Representative for St. Bernard Parish and also from 1969-1972 for Plaquemines Parish
- In office 1969–1976
- Preceded by: Sammy Nunez
- Succeeded by: Richard Alvin Tonry (new District 103)

Personal details
- Born: Elmer Robert Tapper; June 19, 1929 St. Bernard Parish; Louisiana, United States
- Died: September 17, 2011 (aged 82) Everett; Snohomish County; Washington, United States
- Resting place: Tahoma Memorial Cemetery in Tahoma, Washington
- Party: Democratic
- Spouse: Audra Galjour Tapper
- Children: Marilyn, Tania, and Elmer Tapper, Jr.
- Education: Loyola University New Orleans College of Law
- Occupation: Attorney

Military service
- Branch/service: United States Army
- Rank: Private

Elmer Robert Tapper Sr. (June 19, 1929 – September 17, 2011), usually known as E. T. Tapper, was an attorney and a Democratic member of the Louisiana House of Representatives from his native St. Bernard Parish, Louisiana.

Tapper was first elected to the House in 1960, with the incoming Jimmie Davis administration. He was unseated in 1964 by fellow Democrat Sammy Nunez. However, he returned to the House in a special election in 1969. In his second stint from 1969 to 1972, Tapper served from a combined St. Bernard and Plaquemines district. From 1972 to 1976, he again represented only St. Bernard Parish. In 1973, Tapper was a delegate to the Louisiana Constitutional Convention, which produced a new governing document for his state.

The son of Elmer and Sarah Tapper, he was reared in Violet, a census-designated place in St. Bernard Parish and a suburb of New Orleans, where Tapper assisted his father in fishing local lakes and the Gulf of Mexico. He was christened in the Roman Catholic Church. In 1952, he received his law degree from Loyola University New Orleans College of Law. He wed his high school sweetheart, the former Audra Galjour, and then entered the United States Army. Upon discharge from military service as a private, Tapper practiced law for thirty-five years and served a total of eleven years in the legislature, claiming to have represented the interests of "the little guy." From 1976 to 1984, Tapper was the attorney for the Louisiana Pardon Board.

In his later years, Tapper and his wife relocated to Everett, Washington, where he died at the age of eighty-two.

Political offices
Preceded by August J. Campagne	Louisiana State Representative from St. Bernard Parish; 1960–1964	Succeeded by Sammy Nunez
Preceded by Sammy Nunez	Louisiana State Representative for St. Bernard Parish and also from 1969 to 1972 for Plaquemines Parish; 1969–1976	Succeeded by Richard Alvin Tonry (District 103)
