= Quentin Dastugue =

American politician

Quentin D. Dastugue is a real estate businessman and politician in Louisiana. He served four terms in the Louisiana House of Representatives. A Democrat, he was elected to the Louisiana House in 1979 and 1983. He was a gubernatorial candidate in 1995. He was inducted into the Louisiana Political Hall of Fame in 2018.

In 2021 he sold his real estate business. He has Parkinson's disease and has fundraised to help find a cure.
