= Joachim O. Fernández =

American politician

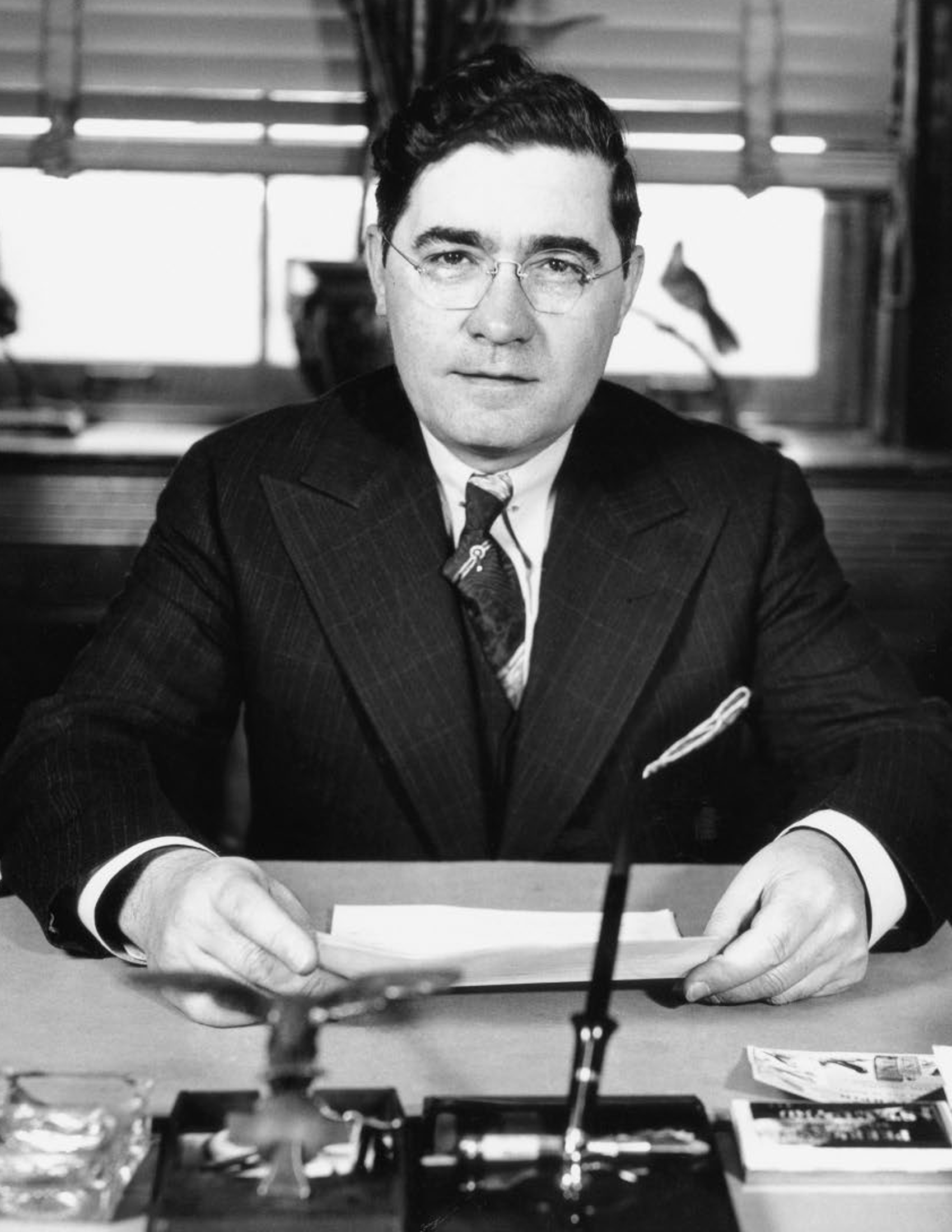
- Joachim Fernández

Member of the U. S. House of Representatives from Louisiana's 1st district
- In office March 4, 1931 – January 3, 1941
- Preceded by: James O'Connor
- Succeeded by: Felix Edward Hébert

Louisiana State Representative from Orleans Parish (at-large delegation)
- In office 1924–1928

Louisiana State Senator from Orleans Parish (at-large)
- In office 1928–1930

Personal details
- Born: Joachim Octave Fernández; August 14, 1896 New Orleans, Louisiana, U.S.
- Died: August 8, 1978 (aged 81) New Orleans, Louisiana, U.S.
- Resting place: Metairie Cemetery of New Orleans
- Party: Democratic
- Spouse: Viola Murray (m. 1920)
- Children: 4
- Occupation: Not available

Military service
- Branch/service: United States Navy
- Rank: Lieutenant Commander
- Battles/wars: World War II

Joachim Octave Fernández (August 14, 1896 – August 8, 1978), was a member of the U. S. House of Representatives for Louisiana's 1st congressional district. Like all other members of his state's congressional delegation at the time of his tenure, Fernández was a Democrat.

== Biography ==
Son of Octave Gonzales Fernández and Mary Benson, he was born, lived, and died in New Orleans, Louisiana. Their ancestors came from the Canary Islands, Spain and were also of Cajun, Alsatian, and Galician descent. Settlers in Louisiana from the Canaries are known as Isleños. On June 3, 1920, he married Viola Murray, and the couple had two sons and two daughters. He began his political career as a member of the Old Regular political machine. He was a member of the Louisiana House of Representatives from 1924 to 1928 and the State Senate from 1928 to 1930 at the time of the administration of Mayor T. Semmes Walmsley. In 1930, however, Fernández defected to the camp of Walmsley's enemy, Governor Huey Pierce Long, Jr. He became Long's Ninth Ward political boss and was elected to the House of Representatives in 1930 with Long's support. He lost his seat in 1940 to reform candidate Felix Edward Hébert, a former journalist for the New Orleans Times-Picayune.

Fernández was a delegate to the Louisiana state constitutional convention in 1921, which wrote the document to govern his state until 1975. He was an alternate delegate to the 1936 Democratic National Convention, which renominated the Franklin D. Roosevelt-John Nance Garner ticket. In his forties, Fernández served in the United States Navy as a lieutenant commander during World War II. After his congressional service, Fernández was the U.S. collector of internal revenue in New Orleans.

In the election of 1946, Fernández briefly served as the reform candidate against Mayor Robert Maestri, but he withdrew from the race at the last minute after Maestri offered to pay his campaign expenses. Maestri was unseated, however, by the reformers' choice, deLesseps Story Morrison.

== Personal life ==
Fernández was Roman Catholic and Hispanic. He was a member of the American Legion. He is interred at the large Metairie Cemetery in New Orleans.

== See also ==
- List of Hispanic and Latino Americans in the United States Congress

U.S. House of Representatives
Preceded by James O'Connor	United States Representative for the 1st Congressional District of Louisiana; 1931 – 1941	Succeeded by Felix Edward Hébert
