= E. L. Henry =

American politician (1936–2025)

Member of the Louisiana House of Representatives
- In office 1968–1980

Speaker of the Louisiana House of Representatives
- In office 1972–1980
- Preceded by: John Sidney Garrett
- Succeeded by: John J. Hainkel Jr.

Personal details
- Born: February 10, 1936 Jonesboro, Louisiana, U.S.
- Died: April 23, 2025 (aged 89) Baton Rouge, Louisiana, U.S.
- Party: Democratic
- Education: Baylor University; Louisiana State University

E. L. Henry (February 10, 1936 – April 23, 2025) was an American politician. A Democrat, he served in the Louisiana House of Representatives from 1968 to 1980.

== Life and career ==
Henry was born in Jonesboro, Louisiana on February 10, 1936. He attended Baylor University and Louisiana State University.

Henry served in the Louisiana House of Representatives from 1968 to 1980.

In 2012, Henry was inducted into the Louisiana Political Museum and Hall of Fame.

Henry died on April 23, 2025, at the age of 89.
