= Randy Ewing =

American politician (born 1944)

Randy L. Ewing

49th President of the Louisiana Senate
- In office 1996–2000
- Preceded by: Samuel B. Nunez Jr.
- Succeeded by: John Hainkel

Member of the Louisiana State Senate
- In office 1988–2000
- Constituency: District 35

Personal details
- Born: Randy Lynn Ewing; February 12, 1944 (age 82) Jonesboro, Louisiana, U.S.
- Party: Democratic
- Education: Louisiana State University
- Occupation: Politician; Businessman
- Awards: Louisiana Political Museum and Hall of Fame (2001)

Randy L. Ewing is a former state legislator in Louisiana who served in the Louisiana Senate from 1988 to 2000 including as President of the Louisiana Senate during his last term from 1996 to 2000. He ran for governor in 2003. He was inducted into the Louisiana Political Hall of Fame.

A Democrat, he has lived in Quitman, Louisiana. He represented Jackson Parish. An interview he gave in 1995 is online.
