= Lynn Dean =

American politician (1923–2022)

Lynn Blackwell Dean

Member of the Louisiana State Senate from the 1st district
- In office 1996–2004
- Preceded by: Samuel B. Nunez Jr.
- Succeeded by: Walter Boasso

President of St. Bernard Parish
- In office 1992–1996
- Preceded by: Position established
- Succeeded by: Charles H. Ponstein

Member of the St. Bernard Parish School Board
- In office 1981–1991

Personal details
- Born: Lynn Blackwell Dean; December 22, 1923 Arkansas, U.S.
- Died: July 6, 2022 (aged 98) Covington, Louisiana, U.S.
- Party: Republican

Lynn Blackwell Dean (December 22, 1923 – July 6, 2022) was an American politician from Louisiana.

Dean was born on December 22, 1923. In the big lake community of Arkansas.He graduated from Warren Easton High School in New Orleans, Louisiana in 1940. He became a marine engineer, and founded the Universal Repair Service in 1949 with his twin brother, Orrin. Lynn later established Elevating Boats Inc.

Dean was a member of the St. Bernard Parish school board from 1981 to 1991, and led the St. Bernard Parish Council as president between 1992 and 1996. He served on the Louisiana Senate from 1996 to 2004 as a Republican. He replaced Samuel B. Nunez Jr. in Senate district 1, and was succeeded in office by Walter Boasso. He was the only member of the St. Bernard Council to support gay rights at the time.

Dean died on July 6, 2022, at the age of 98 in Covington, Louisiana at St Anthony’s Garden’s Nursing Home.

Political offices
Preceded by Position established	President of St. Bernard Parish; 1992–1996	Succeeded by Charles H. Ponstein
Louisiana State Senate
Preceded by Samuel B. Nunez Jr.	Member of the Louisiana State Senate from the 1st district 1996–2004	Succeeded by Walter Boasso
