= Richard Zuschlag =

American businessman (1948–2024)

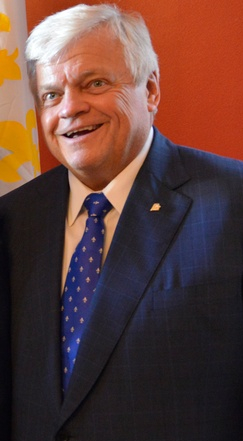
- Zuschlag in 2015
- Born: Richard Emery Zuschlag; March 28, 1948; Greenville, Pennsylvania, U.S.
- Died: June 5, 2024 (aged 76); Lafayette, Louisiana, U.S.
- Education: Capitol Technology University (BoS)
- Occupations: Businessman, engineer
- Honours: Louisiana Political Museum and Hall of Fame inductee (2019)

Richard Emery Zuschlag (March 28, 1948 – June 5, 2024) was an American businessman who was the chairman and chief executive officer of Acadian Ambulance Service, which he co-founded in 1971, in Lafayette, Louisiana. Zuschlag previously worked at the Greenville Broadcasting Company and Westinghouse Electric Space and Defense Center. Prior to his death, he was the only one of the three co-founders of Acadian Ambulance who remained with the company, which is best known for its advanced technologies in medical care and communications.

== Biography ==
A native of Greenville in Mercer County in northwestern Pennsylvania, Zuschlag graduated in 1970 with a Bachelor of Science degree in electrical engineering from Capitol Technology University in Washington, D.C., then known as Capitol College.

Zuschlag served on numerous committees and boards, including the Bush-Clinton Coastal Recovery Fund Committee, American Ambulance Association, Louisiana State University Board of Supervisors, University of Louisiana at Lafayette Foundation, Tiger Athletic Foundation, New Orleans Business Council, Drew Brees Quarterback Club, Lafayette Civic Cup, Lafayette Parish Communication District, Lafayette Chamber of Commerce, Louisiana Hospital Association, Acadiana Safety Association, 232-HELP, Council for a Better Louisiana, Louisiana Emergency Preparedness Association, Louisiana Association of Broadcasters, Louisiana Association of Business and Industry, and Committee 100.

=== Death ===
Zuschlag died from cancer in Lafayette, Louisiana, on June 5, 2024, at age 76.

=== Awards ===
- 2022 Honored by Community Foundation of Acadiana as its Leader in Philanthropy for Lafayette Parish.
- 2022 Received the Walter J. Schaefer Award from American Ambulance Association.
- 2020 Received the William A. Oliver Memorial Award from the LA RISE Coalition.
- 2019 Honored by UL Lafayette during its Spring Gala.
- 2019 Inducted into the Louisiana Political Museum and Hall of Fame in Winnfield, along with four others (he was a Republican)
- 2012 Entrepreneur of the Year in the Healthcare and Healthcare Services category for the Gulf Coast Region of the accounting firm of Ernst & Young
- 2012 Louisiana Legends from Louisiana Public Broadcasting
- 2005 Honorable Mention Entrepreneur Award from Inc. magazine
- 1995 Distinguished Citizen Award from the Evangeline Area Council of the Boy Scouts of America
- 1995 Golden Mike Award from the Louisiana Association of Broadcasters
- 1991 Senate Innovation Award from former U.S. Senator John Breaux
- 1988 Marketer of the Year
- 1980 Louisiana Businessman of the Year from the Small Business Administration
