= Kathleen Blanco =

Governor of Louisiana from 2004 to 2008

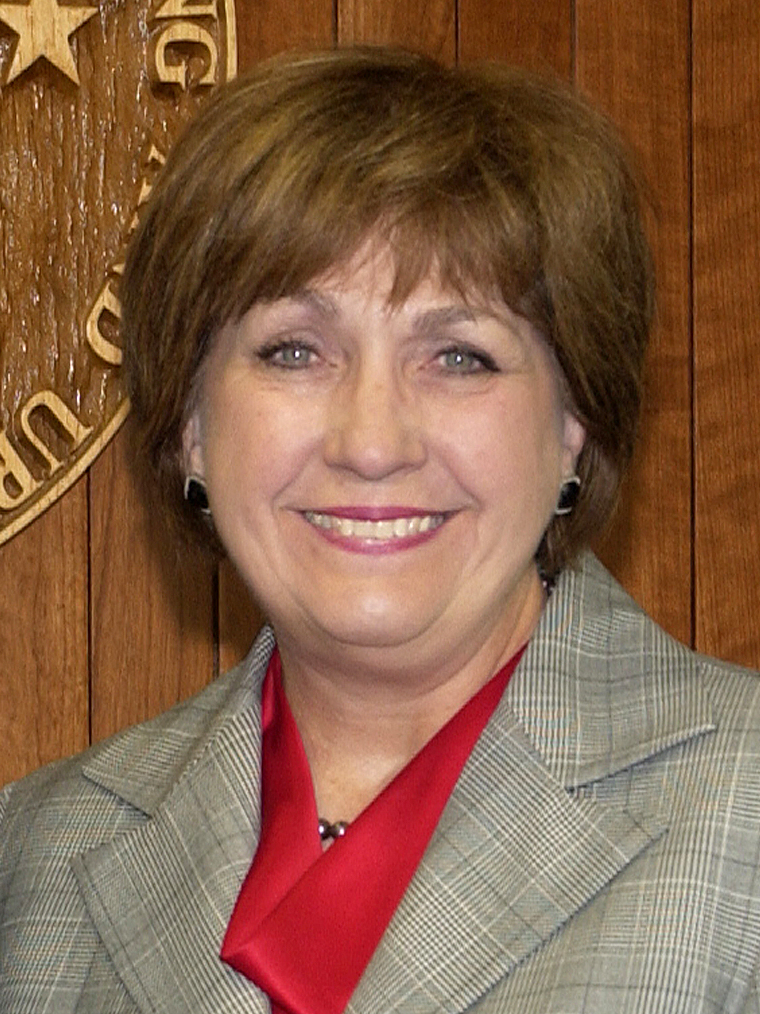
- Blanco in 2006

54th Governor of Louisiana
- In office January 12, 2004 – January 14, 2008
- Lieutenant: Mitch Landrieu
- Preceded by: Mike Foster
- Succeeded by: Bobby Jindal

50th Lieutenant Governor of Louisiana
- In office January 8, 1996 – January 12, 2004
- Governor: Mike Foster
- Preceded by: Melinda Schwegmann
- Succeeded by: Mitch Landrieu

Member of the Louisiana Public Service Commission from the 2nd district
- In office January 1, 1989 – January 8, 1996
- Succeeded by: Jimmy Field

Member of the Louisiana House of Representatives from the 45th district
- In office March 12, 1984 – January 1, 1989
- Preceded by: Luke LeBlanc
- Succeeded by: Jerry LeBlanc

Personal details
- Born: Kathleen Marie Babineaux; December 15, 1942 New Iberia, Louisiana, U.S.
- Died: August 18, 2019 (aged 76) Lafayette, Louisiana, U.S.
- Party: Democratic
- Spouse: Raymond Blanco (m. 1964)
- Children: 6
- Education: University of Louisiana, Lafayette (BS)

Kathleen Marie Blanco (née Babineaux; December 15, 1942 – August 18, 2019) was an American politician who served as the 54th governor of Louisiana from 2004 to 2008. A member of the Democratic Party, she was the first and, to date, only woman elected as the state's governor.

When first elected, Blanco outlined her top priorities as providing affordable healthcare, improving the education system in the state, and helping to create a strong and vibrant economy through aggressive economic development initiatives. Her work as governor changed dramatically when, in 2005, coastal Louisiana was severely damaged by two hurricanes that struck less than a month apart. In August, Hurricane Katrina devastated the New Orleans region, an urban area of 1.4 million people. Then, in September, Hurricane Rita struck the southwestern coast, displacing another 300,000 people. More than 200,000 housing units were destroyed, 81,000 businesses closed, entire electrical and telecommunication systems were torn apart, and one million people were made homeless as a result of severe flooding caused by levee failures and storm surges.

Many believed the immediate response from the city, state, and federal governments was inadequate, and Blanco later fully acknowledged there were failures on the part of her administration before and after the storm; however, much criticism, both locally and nationally, was directed at the Federal Emergency Management Agency and at President Bush, for what was seen as a slow initial response to the disaster and an inability to effectively manage, care for and deliver promised resources to those trying to evacuate from New Orleans.

Blanco announced in March 2007 that she would not seek re-election later that year, saying that she would instead "focus [her] time and energy for the [remainder of her term] on the people's work, not on [the] politics" of running for another term. In June 2011 she was diagnosed with cancer, and she died eight years later on August 18, 2019.

== Early life and career ==
She was born Kathleen Marie Babineaux in New Iberia, Louisiana, the daughter of Louis Babineaux and his wife, the former Lucille Fremin, both of Cajun ancestry. Her Babineaux grandfather was a farmer and grocer with a country store, and her father was a small businessman who moved to the rural hamlet of Coteau, a community near New Iberia with one church and one elementary school. Blanco attended Mount Carmel Academy, an all-girls school run by the Roman Catholic Sisters of Mount Carmel, which was situated on the banks of Bayou Teche. In 1964, Blanco received a Bachelor of Science in business education from the University of Louisiana at Lafayette, then named the University of Southwestern Louisiana. She was also a member of Kappa Delta sorority. On August 8, 1964, she married Raymond Blanco, a football coach and educator; the couple had six children.

Following college, Blanco taught business at Breaux Bridge High School. She then worked for roughly fifteen years as a stay-at-home mom for her six children. She later worked as a District Manager for the U.S. Department of Commerce during the 1980 Census initiative and with her husband, owned Coteau Consultants, a political and marketing research firm.

Prior to her election as governor, Blanco served twenty years in public office. In 1983, elected as the first woman legislator from the city of Lafayette, she served five years in the Louisiana House of Representatives. In her first term, she and her friend Evelyn Blackmon of West Monroe were two of only five women in both houses of the legislature. Blanco in 1988 defeated the Republican Kernan "Skip" Hand to become the first woman in Louisiana elected to the Louisiana Public Service Commission, a post that she held for seven years, She was also the first woman chairman of the PSC. She was then elected Lieutenant Governor, a post that she held for eight years.

== Governor of Louisiana ==
Blanco was elected on November 15, 2003, defeating her Republican opponent Bobby Jindal in the general election, by a margin of 52 to 48 percent. On January 12, 2004, she took the oath of office in both English and French languages, succeeding Murphy J. Foster Jr. She retained Foster's chief of staff Andy Kopplin. She named as the new state commissioner of administration Jerry Luke LeBlanc, who had succeeded her in the state House in 1989 when she became a public service commissioner. Blanco traveled more than her predecessor, seeking new sources of economic development for the state. She visited Nova Scotia and in December 2004 visited Cuba to boost its trade with the state. During this controversial visit, she met with President Fidel Castro, with whom the United States government had no formal diplomatic relations. In 2005, Blanco also visited the Asian countries of Japan, China, and Taiwan.

Despite the upheaval of Hurricanes Katrina and Rita, she met all of her initial goals by the end of her term, most notably prioritizing education investment from pre-kindergarten to the university level. She recruited a number of businesses to Louisiana and established policies to lay a foundation for the recovery of coastal Louisiana.

As governor, she was a member of the National Governors Association, and the Democratic Governors Association, and served as president of the Southern Governors' Association.

Blanco tapped Donald E. Hines, a family physician from Bunkie in Avoyelles Parish, as the president of the state Senate. He held the position during her entire administration.

=== Hurricane Katrina ===
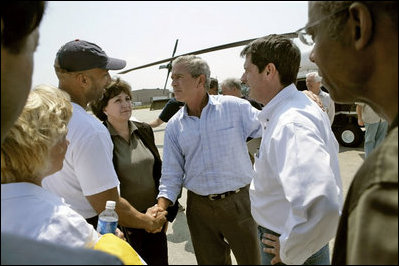
New Orleans Mayor Ray Nagin, Blanco, President Bush and U.S. Senator David Vitter (R-LA)

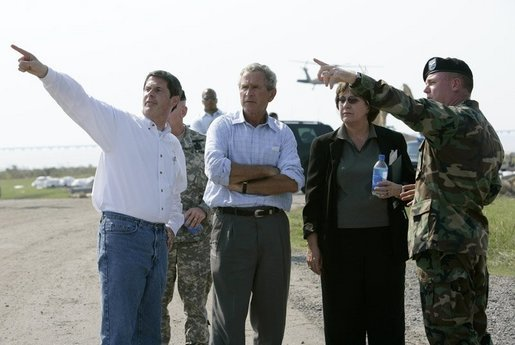
President Bush tours damage in the Township of Metairie where Hurricane Katrina broke through the levee with, from left, U.S. Senator David Vitter, Governor Kathleen Blanco and Army Corps of Engineers Col. Richard Wagenaar Friday, September 2, 2005. White House photo by Eric Draper

On August 27, 2005, Blanco, speaking about Hurricane Katrina, told the media in Jefferson Parish, "I believe we are prepared. That's the one thing that I've always been able to brag about." Later that day, she issued a request for federal assistance and US$9 million in aid to U.S. President George W. Bush, which stated,

... I have determined that this incident is of such severity and magnitude that effective response is beyond the capabilities of the State and affected local governments, and that supplementary Federal assistance is necessary to save lives, protect property, public health, and safety, or to lessen or avert the threat of a disaster. I am specifically requesting emergency protective measures, direct Federal Assistance, Individual and Household Program (IHP) assistance, Special Needs Program assistance, and debris removal.

Also in the request letter, the governor stated, "In response to the situation, I have taken appropriate action under State law and directed the execution of the State Emergency Plan on August 26, 2005, in accordance with Section 501 (a) of the Stafford Act. A State of Emergency has been issued for the State in order to support the evacuations of the coastal areas in accordance with our State Evacuation Plan."

FEMA issued a statement, dated August 27, that President Bush authorized the allocation of federal resources, following a review of FEMA's analysis of the state's request for federal assistance. A White House statement of the same date also acknowledges this authorization of aid by President Bush. On August 28, Blanco sent a letter to President Bush that increased the amount of aid requested to US$130 million. Mayor Ray Nagin, in response to the offer of an Amtrak train to evacuate New Orleans residents, rejected the offer, declared an emergency, and then canceled it. He then flew to Dallas with his family. President George Bush now declared a State of Emergency and brought in U.S. Army Lieutenant General Russel Honoré to be in charge of all forces. The president sent members of the National Guard, the U.S. Coast Guard, the carrier USS Bataan, and the U.S. Air Force. It was the largest deployment of military forces within domestic territory since the United States Civil War.

Blanco oversaw the massive evacuation of 93% of the New Orleans area and the subsequent rescue effort utilizing state employees, law enforcement agencies from across the state and nation, citizen volunteers, and federal emergency services such as the U.S. Coast Guard and other U.S. military forces. More than 60,000 people were rescued and removed from the affected region after the storm. As Commander-in-Chief of the Louisiana National Guard, Blanco called on her fellow governors for troop reinforcement as more than a third of her own soldiers and airmen were serving in Iraq and Afghanistan. The response from states delivered nearly 40,000 troops to her command, one of the largest domestic activation of troops in the nation's history.

On September 1, 2005, with reports of looting and lawlessness escalating, Blanco announced she was sending 300 Louisiana National Guardsmen to supplement the New Orleans Police Department, saying,

These troops are fresh back from Iraq. They are well-trained, experienced, battle-tested and under my orders to restore order in the streets. These are some of the 40,000 extra troops that I have demanded. They have M-16's, and they're locked and loaded. When hoodlums victimize and inflict suffering on people at their wit's end, they're taking away our limited resources, or whatever resources we have, to save babies, or save children and to save good people. I have one message for these hoodlums. These troops know how to shoot and kill and they are more than willing to do so if necessary, and I expect they will.

This followed President Bush's statement that looters in New Orleans and elsewhere in the chaotic aftermath of Hurricane Katrina should be treated with "zero tolerance".

President Bush, during a visit to Louisiana on September 2, 2005, five days after the storm, offered to federalize the Louisiana National Guard to simplify the command structure. The Governor declined because the Guard would then become part of the federal military forces and therefore lose much-needed policing powers. The President subsequently continued to press the offer, so Blanco rejected it in writing, citing the need for flexibility in National Guard operations, particularly the need for the Guard in areas other than New Orleans where the military was not currently operating. Governor Haley Barbour of Mississippi reportedly declined a similar offer from the President. Had either state's National Guard been federalized, they would not have been able to directly enforce state law (e.g., control looting) under the provisions of the 1878 Posse Comitatus Act. It had not previously been a policy during natural disasters to combine the command of National Guard and military operations under the authority of the President. President Bush had the power to take command of a state's National Guard units under the Insurrection Act of 1807 without the agreement of a state Governor, but no President had done this since Lyndon Johnson in the 1960s, and President Bush had so far also declined to do so. However, Blanco and Major General Bennett Landreneau, Louisiana Adjutant General and senior Louisiana National Guard officer, cooperated closely with U.S. Army Lieutenant General Honoré, who was then commanding Federal military operations under Joint Task Force Katrina.

CNN and Fox News reported the Louisiana Homeland Security Department (which operated under Blanco's authority) refused to allow the American Red Cross to enter the city of New Orleans. The American Red Cross confirmed that the organization had not entered the city to provide aid but also stated that it was providing relief at the evacuation centers: "As the remaining people are evacuated from New Orleans, the most appropriate role for the Red Cross is to provide a safe place for people to stay and to see that their emergency needs are met. We are fully staffed and equipped to handle these individuals once they are evacuated." The deputy director of Louisiana's Homeland Security Department, Colonel Jay Mayeaux, stated that he asked the Red Cross to delay relief operations for 24 hours for logistical reasons, and by the time that was up, the evacuations had already begun.

On September 14, after President Bush had accepted responsibility for all problems that occurred at the federal level, Blanco accepted responsibility for all problems that occurred at the state level. Blanco stated, "At the state level, we must take a careful look at what went wrong and make sure it never happens again. The buck stops here, and as your governor, I take full responsibility." In 2006, a Congressional report stated that the "National Response Plan did not adequately provide a way for federal assets to quickly supplement or, if necessary, supplant first responders".

=== Aftermath and recovery ===
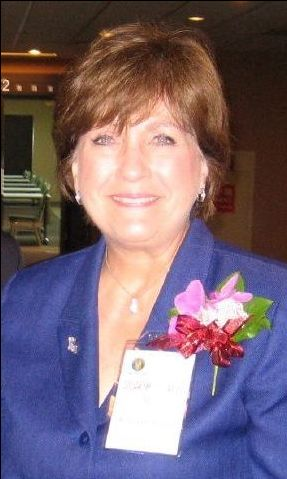
Blanco in Taipei on an official trade mission to Taiwan in 2006.

Blanco continued to press President Bush and Congress for additional recovery funds for Louisiana, highlighting the disparity in assistance received by Louisiana compared with neighboring Mississippi.

Early in 2006, Blanco was inducted into the Louisiana Political Museum and Hall of Fame in Winnfield.

On June 19, 2006, Blanco announced that she would send the National Guard to patrol the streets of New Orleans after five teenagers were killed, in an effort to combat a greatly increased rate of violent crime.

Also on June 19, 2006, Blanco signed into law a ban on most forms of abortion (unless the life of the mother was in danger or her health would be permanently damaged) once it passed the state legislature. Although she felt exclusions for rape or incest would have "been reasonable," she felt she should not veto based on those reasons. The bill would only go into effect if the United States Supreme Court reversed Roe v. Wade.

In August 2006, Blanco filed a lawsuit and formally objected to the federal Gulf of Mexico lease sale "to force the federal government to spend part of its oil and gas income from the Outer Continental Shelf to help shore up Louisiana's coastline".

In December 2006, Blanco called a special session of the Louisiana State Legislature which she intended to use to dispense $2.1 billion worth of tax cuts, teacher raises, road projects and other spending programs. Legislators allied with Blanco attempted to lift a spending cap imposed by the Constitution of Louisiana, but Republican lawmakers rejected the governor's spending measure. The high-profile defeat further eroded Blanco's political reputation.

By late 2006 and early 2007, Blanco was facing increasingly heated accusations of delays in administering the Road Home Program, a state-run program that Blanco and the Louisiana Recovery Authority had set up following Katrina in order to distribute federal aid money to Katrina victims for damage to their homes. By January 2007, fewer than 250 of an estimated 100,000 applicants had received payments from the program, and many of the payments were apparently based on assessments which grossly undervalued the cost of damage to homes.

Facing an upcoming re-election campaign with greatly reduced popularity, Blanco made repeated public criticisms of the administration of President Bush in January 2007. Noting that Bush neglected to mention Gulf Coast reconstruction in his 2007 State of the Union Address, Blanco called for a bipartisan Congressional investigation into the conduct of the Bush administration following Katrina, to determine whether partisan politics played a role in the slow response to the storm. This call followed comments by former Federal Emergency Management Agency (FEMA) director Michael D. Brown, who claimed that the White House offer to federalize the National Guard in the days following the storm was part of a plan to upstage Blanco. Blanco has also publicly stated that Mississippi received preferential treatment because its governor, Haley Barbour, is Republican.

Blanco announced on March 20, 2007, that she would not seek re-election. On January 14, 2008, Bobby Jindal succeeded her as governor.

== Health and death ==
Initially diagnosed with cancer in 2011, Blanco was treated and entered remission. In December 2017, Blanco experienced a recurrence with ocular melanoma metastatic to her liver. A year later at a meeting of the civic association, the Council for a Better Louisiana, Blanco said there is "no escape" from the disease as it had metastasized throughout her body and she has "made peace" with her future. On April 19, 2019, it was announced that she was in hospice care.

Blanco died on August 18, 2019, at the St. Joseph Hospice Carpenter House in Lafayette, Louisiana.

Governor John Bel Edwards later ordered flags across Louisiana to remain at half staff until August 24, 2019, in her honor. She would lie in state at the Louisiana State Capitol in Baton Rouge on August 22, 2019, becoming the fourth former Louisiana governor to achieve this honor; this service had open casket viewing.

== Electoral history ==
Source: Louisiana Secretary of State

=== Louisiana House of Representatives ===
==== 1983 ====
45th State House District Blanket Primary
Party	Candidate	Votes	%
Republican	Jan Heymann	5,252	36.73%
Democratic	Kathleen Blanco	4,315	30.17%
Democratic	Robert Domingue	3,264	22.82%
Democratic	Stephen Spring	1,470	10.28%
Total votes		14,301	100%

45th State House District Runoff Election
Party	Candidate	Votes	%
Democratic	Kathleen Blanco	5,642	59.98%
Republican	Jan Heymann	3,764	40.02%
Total votes		9,406	100%

==== 1987 ====
45th State House District General Election
Party	Candidate	Votes	%
Democratic	Kathleen Blanco (incumbent)	7,713	60.49%
Republican	J. Luke LeBlanc	5,037	39.51%
Total votes		12,750	100%

=== Louisiana Public Service Commission ===
==== 1988 ====
District 2 Blanket Primary
Party	Candidate	Votes	%
Democratic	Kathleen Blanco	44,450	32.32%
Republican	Kernan Hand	25,293	18.39%
Democratic	George Ackel	23,383	17.00%
Democratic	Edward Lyons	22,082	16.06%
Democratic	Lloyd Giardina	15,619	11.36%
Democratic	Jerry Wattigny	3,590	2.61%
Republican	Leon Kinchen	3,105	2.26%
Total votes		137,522	100%

District 2 Runoff Election
Party	Candidate	Votes	%
Democratic	Kathleen Blanco	161,270	57.26%
Republican	Kernan Hand	120,392	42.74%
Total votes		281,662	100%

==== 1994 ====
District 2 General Election
Party	Candidate	Votes	%
Democratic	Kathleen Blanco (incumbent)	Unopposed	N/A

=== Lieutenant Governor of Louisiana ===
==== 1995 ====
Louisiana Lieutenant Gubernatorial Blanket Primary
Party	Candidate	Votes	%
Democratic	Kathleen Blanco	590,410	43.68%
Republican	Suzanne Krieger	211,520	15.65%
Democratic	Chris John	206,915	15.31%
Republican	Greg Marcantel	76,488	5.66%
Republican	Charles Blaylock	74,366	5.50%
Independent	Eric Guirard	66,947	4.95%
Democratic	Robert Patrick	40,210	2.97%
Democratic	Jay Chevalier	27,900	2.06%
Democratic	Antoine Saacks	22,908	1.70%
Independent	Raoul Armando Galan	18,630	1.38%
Democratic	Julius Leahman	15,461	1.14%
Total votes		1,351,755	100%

Louisiana Lieutenant Gubernatorial Runoff Election
Party	Candidate	Votes	%
Democratic	Kathleen Blanco	964,559	65.25%
Republican	Suzanne Krieger	513,613	34.75%
Total votes		1,478,172	100%
Democratic hold			

==== 1999 ====
Louisiana Lieutenant Gubernatorial Election
Party	Candidate	Votes	%
Democratic	Kathleen Blanco (incumbent)	968,249	80.22%
Republican	Kevin Duplantis	121,296	10.05%
Republican	Cornel Martin	98,122	8.13%
Independent	Sadie Roberts-Joseph	19,345	1.60%
Total votes		1,207,012	100%

=== Governor of Louisiana ===
==== 2003 ====
Louisiana Gubernatorial Blanket Primary
Party	Candidate	Votes	%
Republican	Bobby Jindal	443,389	32.54%
Democratic	Kathleen Blanco	250,136	18.36%
Democratic	Richard Ieyoub	223,513	16.40%
Democratic	Claude "Buddy" Leach	187,872	13.79%
Democratic	Randy Ewing	123,936	9.10%
Republican	Hunt Downer	84,718	6.22%
Republican	Alan Allgood	7,866	0.58%
Democratic	Patrick Henry Barthel	7,338	0.54%
Independent	Patrick Landry	7,195	0.53%
Independent	Edward Mangin	6,745	0.49%
Independent	J.D. Estillete	6,439	0.47%
Democratic	J.E. Jumonville	3,410	0.25%
Independent	John Simoneaux Jr.	3,280	0.24%
Independent	Quentin Brown Jr.	2,414	0.18%
Democratic	Mike Stagg	1,667	0.12%
Democratic	Richard McCoy	1,513	0.11%
Democratic	Fred Robertson	1,093	0.08%
Total votes		1,362,524	100%

Louisiana Gubernatorial Runoff Election
Party	Candidate	Votes	%
Democratic	Kathleen Blanco	731,358	51.95%
Republican	Bobby Jindal	676,484	48.05%
Total votes		1,407,842	100%
Democratic gain from Republican			

== See also ==
- List of female governors in the United States
- List of female lieutenant governors in the United States

== Videos ==
- Final State of the State Address from April 30, 2007
- Blanco announcing she will not seek reelection from the Governor's Mansion on March 20, 2007
- Addressing Joint Special Session of the Louisiana State Legislature on December 8, 2006
- State of the Address from March 27, 2006
- Opening Address of Joint Special Session of the Louisiana State Legislature at the Morial Convention Center in New Orleans from February 6, 2006
- LPB interview from December 30, 2005
- Headlines from December 16, 2005
- Hurricane Katrina's impact on Louisiana politics
- Headlines from October 7, 2005
- Hurricane Rita aftermath in Vinton LPB Segment from September 30, 2005
- Governor Blanco's address to Joint Special Session from September 16, 2005
- WWL-TV New Orleans interview from August 30, 2005
- Governor Blanco's opening address to Regular Session of the Louisiana State Legislature from March 29, 2004
- Special Session Address from March 7, 2004
- Blanco's Inauguration as Louisiana's 54th Governor from January 12, 2004

Louisiana House of Representatives
Preceded by J. Luke LeBlanc	Member of the Louisiana House of Representatives from the 45th district 1984–1989	Succeeded by Jerry Luke LeBlanc
Political offices
Preceded by ???	Member of the Louisiana Public Service Commission from the 2nd District; 1989–1996	Succeeded by Jimmy Field
Preceded by Melinda Schwegmann	Lieutenant Governor of Louisiana; 1996–2004	Succeeded by Mitch Landrieu
Preceded by Murphy Foster	Governor of Louisiana; 2004–2008	Succeeded by Bobby Jindal
Party political offices
Preceded by Melinda Schwegmann	Democratic nominee for Lieutenant Governor of Louisiana; 1995, 1999	Succeeded by Mitch Landrieu
Preceded by Bill Jefferson	Democratic nominee for Governor of Louisiana; 2003	Succeeded by Walter Boasso
