= Gus Weill =

American author

- Born: March 12, 1933; Lafayette, Louisiana, U.S.
- Died: April 13, 2018 (aged 85); Baton Rouge, Louisiana, U.S.
- Education: Louisiana State University
- Occupations: Political consultant; author
- Spouse: Leanne Svigel Weill
- Children: Gus Weill, Jr. (1962–2004)

Gus Weill Sr. (March 12, 1933 – April 13, 2018), was an American author, public relations specialist, and political consultant originally from Lafayette, Louisiana.

== Background ==
Weill graduated in 1955 from Louisiana State University and then completed United States Army Counter Intelligence School. He was a first lieutenant in the Counter Intelligence Corps in Frankfurt, Germany, until his military discharge in 1957.

In 1958, Weill established the first advertising/public relations firm in Baton Rouge. In 1963, he was introduced to Louisiana Public Service Commissioner John McKeithen of Columbia by Judge Edmund Reggie of Crowley, Louisiana, and soon took over the management of McKeithen's successful gubernatorial campaign. From 1964 to 1968, he served as executive secretary to the governor in McKeithen's first term. Considered the "father of modern political public relations in Louisiana," Weill also handled campaigns for three other Louisiana governors, McKeithen's predecessor and successor, Jimmie Davis and Edwin Washington Edwards, and Edwards' successor and second predecessor, David C. Treen. He trained the Democratic strategist James Carville, a mastermind of the election in 1992 of Bill Clinton, then the governor of Arkansas, as U.S. president. He also groomed other public relations specialists, who became his competitors, such as Raymond Strother, manager of the Gary Hart presidential campaign, and Roy Fletcher, affiliated with Patrick J. Buchanan's insurgent Republican campaigns. Weill managed some 350 campaigns. He also promoted the advantages of the Louisiana Superdome domed stadium in New Orleans. Weill convinced McKeithen to implement the state agency, the Council for the Development of French in Louisiana, or CODOFIL, an idea originally proposed by U.S. Representative James Domengeaux of Lafayette.

== Author ==
An author of novels, plays, and poetry, Weill spent two years working for the producer Otto Preminger. For nineteen years, Weill hosted the program Louisiana Legends on his state's Public Broadcasting Service network. Weill's 2004 novel, The Cajuns, is particularly known for its treatment of Cajun culture and the unique characters of the fictitious Richelieu Parish in the year 1956, with political corruption and petty theft. One of the characters bears the name "Patoot Gaspard," supposedly a veteran member of the Louisiana State Senate. Gaspard's son-in-law, a "Bobby Boudreaux", is the parish sheriff. The local priest, "Father Justin," is Gaspard's son. Though not himself Cajun, the Jewish Weill developed a knowledge of that culture through his rearing in Lafayette.

The Cajuns was inspired by a suggestion from James Carville: "Gus was always telling stories, from the first day I met him. There aren't many people who can tell you the same story, like, eleven times and still make you want to hear it again. He's the best raconteur I've ever met."

Other Weill works include:

- The Bonnet Man
- Flesh with Dana Isaacson
- Fuhrer Seed
- Love and Other Guilts: The Poetry of Gus Weill
- Parradiddle: A Novel
- To Bury a Cousin
- A Woman's Eyes
- You Are My Sunshine: The Jimmie Davis Story, An Affectionate Biography
- The Weill Side of Louisiana Politics: Gus Weill Remembers

== Personal life ==
Weill and his wife, the former Ann Cherry, had a son, Gus Weill Jr. (1962–2004), who was an attorney and public relations specialist in New York City, who suffered from depression and committed suicide at the age of forty-two.

The Weills resided in New York City since December 2002. They have a grandson, Gus Weill, III. Weill died on April 13, 2018, at the age of 85 while under hospice care.

== Awards ==
In 1983, Weill was named to the Douglas L. Manship Hall of Fame in the LSU School of Mass Communications. In 1994, he was named a "Louisiana Legend" by the PBS program that he hosted for many years. In 1996, Weill was inducted into the Louisiana Political Museum and Hall of Fame in Winnfield. For his role in handling more than 350 campaigns, the Louisiana Political Museum and Hall of Fame presented Weill in 2017 with the "Friend of John McKeithen Award."

Erik Spanberg describes Weill, accordingly:

All his life, Gus Weill has been distracted by a restless mind incapable of sticking to one subject for long. That peripatetic nature led to turns as a political consultant, an advertising executive, a gubernatorial adviser, television and radio host, poet, biographer, and now, at last, full-time novelist.
