= F. Edward Hébert =

American journalist and politician (1901–1979)

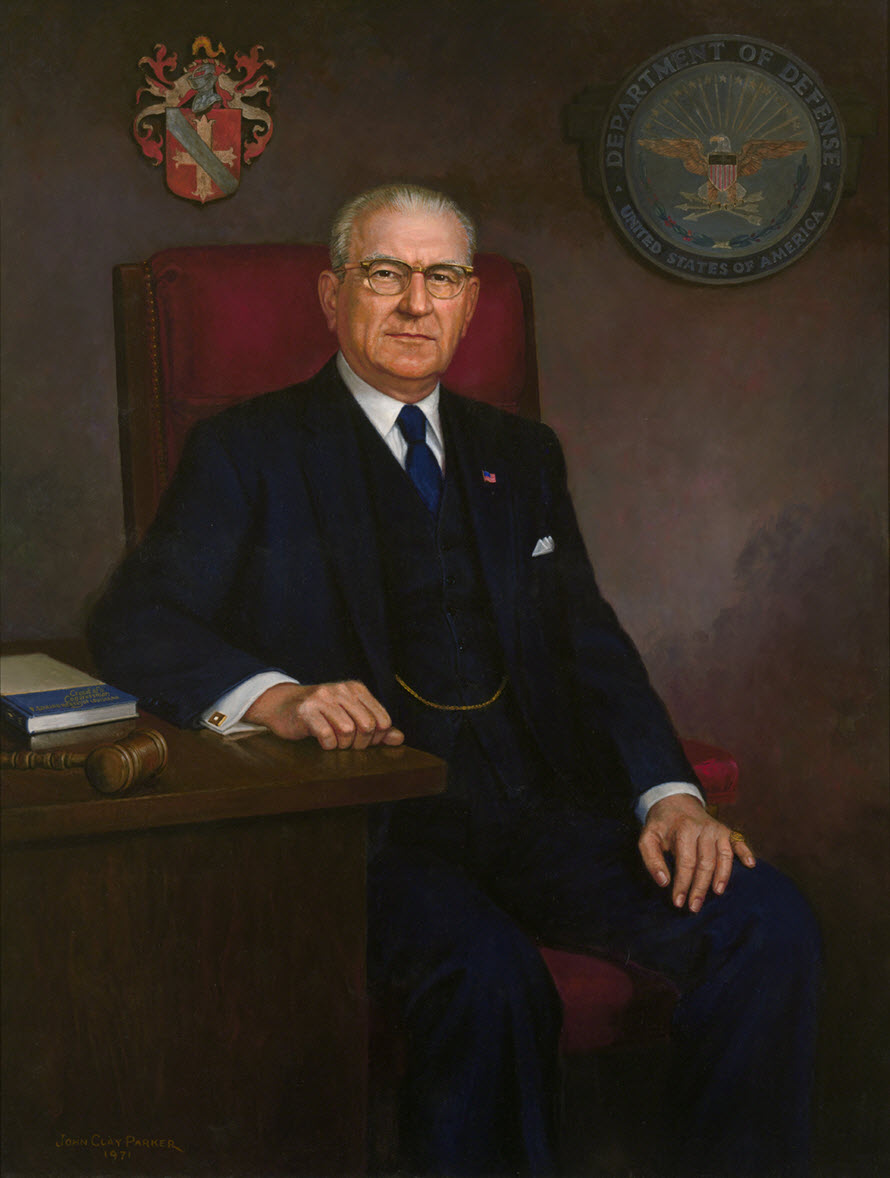

Member of the U.S. House of Representatives from Louisiana's 1st district
- In office January 3, 1941 – January 3, 1977
- Preceded by: Joachim O. Fernández
- Succeeded by: Richard A. Tonry

Chair of the House Armed Services Committee
- In office January 3, 1971 – January 3, 1975
- Preceded by: Philip J. Philbin
- Succeeded by: Charles Melvin Price

Personal details
- Born: Felix Edward Hébert; October 12, 1901 New Orleans, Louisiana, U.S.
- Died: December 29, 1979 (aged 78) New Orleans, Louisiana, U.S.
- Resting place: Lake Lawn Park Mausoleum, New Orleans, Louisiana
- Party: Democratic
- Spouse: Gladys Bofill (m. 1934)
- Relations: John M. Duhé Jr. (Son-in-law)
- Children: Dawn Marie Hébert
- Education: Tulane University
- Profession: Journalist

Felix Edward Hébert (/eɪˈbɛər/ ay-BEAR; October 12, 1901 – December 29, 1979) was an American journalist and politician from Louisiana. He represented the New Orleans–based 1st congressional district as a Democrat for 18 consecutive terms, from 1941 until his retirement in 1977. He remains Louisiana's longest-serving U.S. representative. A contributor to and signatory of the pro-segregationist Southern Manifesto, he served on the United States House Committee on Armed Services from 1948 to 1975. As chairman from 1971 to 1975, he opposed the appointment of women and black legislators to the Committee.

== Early life and education ==
Hébert was born in New Orleans to Felix Joseph Hébert, a streetcar conductor, and the former Lea Naquin, a teacher. As a boy he loved sports, but after a shooting accident left him blind in his left eye at the age of nine, he could not play. However, at Jesuit High School he compensated by becoming manager of all the athletic teams. He reported on prep-school sports for The Times-Picayune, becoming the paper's assistant sports editor before he was out of high school, and at Tulane University he was the first sports editor of the Hullabaloo.

== Journalism career ==
Hébert graduated from Tulane in 1924. He pursued a career in public relations for Loyola University in New Orleans and journalism for the Times-Picayune and the New Orleans States, a paper purchased by The Times-Picayune while Hébert worked there. As a front-page columnist and political editor, he covered the candidacy and election of Governor Huey Long, who was eventually elected to the United States Senate. "In 1939, after being promoted to city editor, Mr. Hebert broke the story of political corruption that became known as the "Louisiana scandals," leading to the jailing of many Long associates and triggering Mr. Hebert's political career, reportedly at the urging of former Gov. James A. Noe, who had broken with the Long machine and reportedly supplied the tip that led to the expose.'— which put a spotlight on corruption among followers of the Long political family — contributed to the eventual convictions of Governor Richard W. Leche and James Monroe Smith, president of Louisiana State University. The Times-Picayune won the Sigma Delta Chi plaque for "courage in journalism", largely as a result of Hébert's work.

"As a member of the Armed Services Committee. He joined the states' rights Dixiecrat revolt in 1948, the only member of the Louisiana delegation to the Democratic National Convention to do so, kindling a feud with President Truman." In later life, Hébert said he never considered himself a politician. He described himself as "an old reporter on a long sabbatical". In 1969 he said, "I had no political ambition whatsoever. I never intended to enter public office; I had never been in public office. In this time, it looked to me like a pretty good chance to be a better reporter if I came to Washington. They got me on sabbatical leave for two years because I knew I would never be re-elected."

== Political career ==
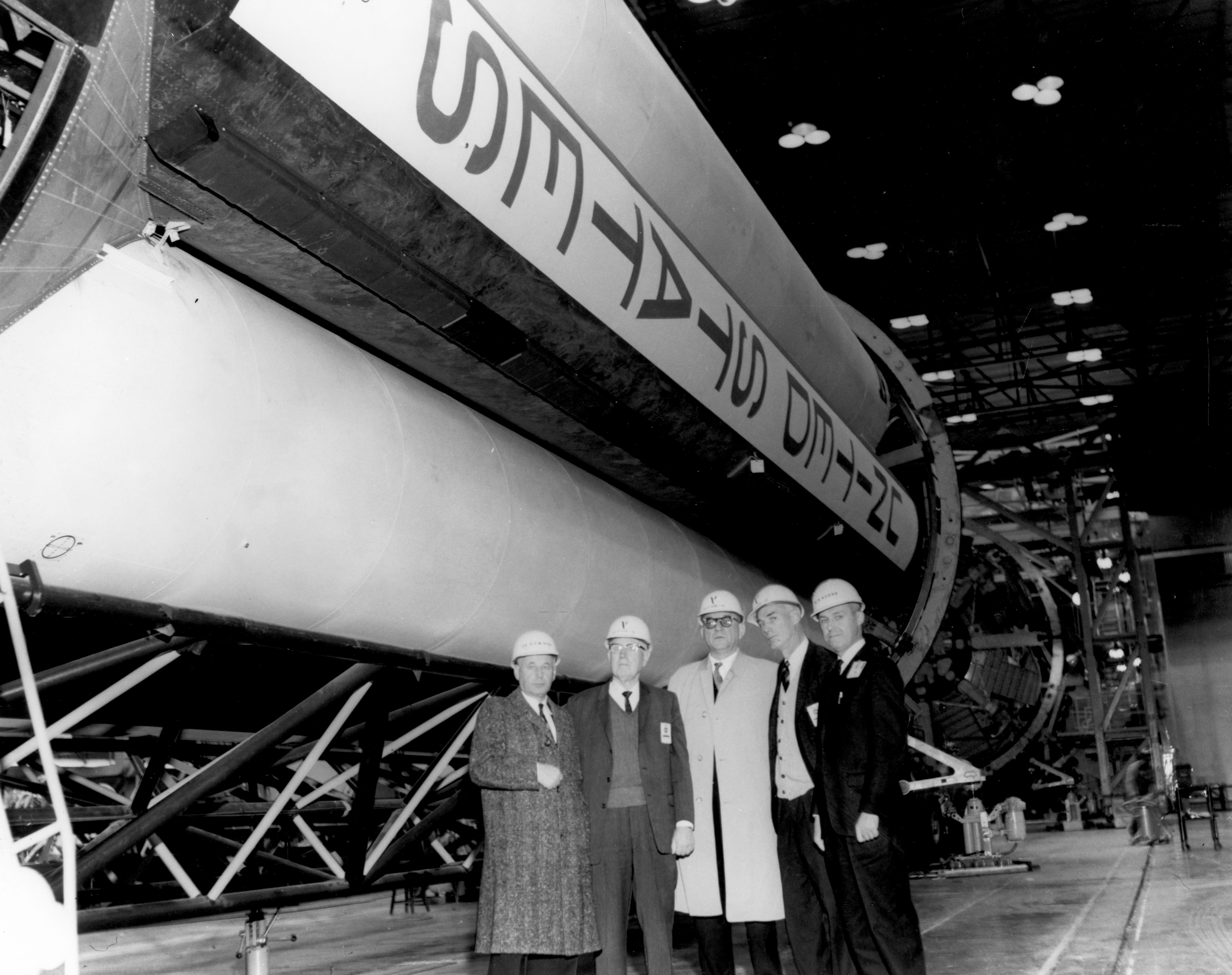
Representative Hébert and other members of the House Committee on Science and Astronautics visited the Marshall Space Flight Center on January 3, 1962, to gather firsthand information of the nation's space exploration program

Hébert's work also led to his election in 1940 to the 77th United States Congress. Hébert served in the United States House of Representatives until the end of the 94th United States Congress, having chosen not to seek a nineteenth term in 1976. That longevity set a Louisiana record for the service in the United States House of Representatives. Hébert was temporarily succeeded by the Democrat Richard Alvin Tonry, who in turn was quickly replaced by Bob Livingston, the first Republican to represent the district since the Reconstruction Era. The seat has remained in Republican hands ever since, passing from Livingston to David Vitter to Bobby Jindal to Steve Scalise.

=== House Committee on Armed Services, 1948–1975 ===
He joined the United States House Committee on Armed Services and was named chairman of the committee's Special Investigations subcommittee.

==== Chairmanship, 1971–1975 ====
Hébert was the chairman of the Committee on Armed Services from 1971 to 1975. When Chairman L. Mendel Rivers died, on December 29, 1970, lame duck committee member Philip J. Philbin took his place; Philbin's term ran out three and a half days later, and Hébert took the post.

Hébert brought millions of dollars in military investment to his district in Louisiana.

Hébert required Pat Schroeder and Ron Dellums, a female and Black Representative respectively, to share a seat in the committee room; Schroeder recalled him saying, "The two of you are only worth half the normal member." He refused to approve her appointment to a U.S. delegation heading to an overseas conference, reportedly remarking, "I wouldn't send you to represent this committee at a dogfight." The State Department eventually waived the rule requiring the chairman's approval of all nominations, and Mrs. Schroeder made the trip.

He was removed from the chairmanship in a revolt of the increasingly young and liberal House Democratic Caucus against the seniority system. Many of the younger Democrats were not pleased when he addressed the new members from the Watergate Class of 1974 as "boys and girls". Governor Edwin Edwards, New Orleans Mayor Moon Landrieu and the Louisiana House delegation chided the caucus for ousting Hebert as his years of political experience had generated thousands of jobs and brought millions of dollars into the state.

== Personal life and family ==
On August 1, 1934, Hébert married Gladys Bofill. The couple had one daughter, Dawn Marie, who married a future judge of the Fifth Circuit Court of Appeals, John Malcolm Duhé Jr., of Iberia Parish. Dawn Hébert was the first woman president of the Greater Iberia Chamber of Commerce.

== Illness and death ==
In 1975 he slipped on a piece of ice at a cocktail party and broke his arm. In 1979 he began to suffer congestive heart failure, and he died on December 29 in New Orleans at Hôtel-Dieu Hospital. A requiem mass was said for him at St. Louis Cathedral by Archbishop Philip Hannan. Hébert is entombed beside his wife in Lake Lawn Park Mausoleum in New Orleans.

== Works ==
- "Last of the titans": the life and times of Congressman F. Edward Hébert of Louisiana (1976)

== Legacy ==
Hébert is responsible for founding the Uniformed Services University of the Health Sciences in Bethesda, Maryland. That university's medical school, the F. Edward Hébert School of Medicine, is named for him.

On January 28, 2012, Hébert was posthumously inducted into the Louisiana Political Museum and Hall of Fame in Winnfield.

F. Edward Hébert Hall, Building 7 at Hébert's alma mater, Tulane University, houses Tulane's Center for Academic Equity, its Africana Studies Department and its History Department. In 2017 Tulane's Undergraduate Student Government resolved to request the board of administrators to allow Hébert Hall to be renamed. A student senator said, "What does it say about what side of history Tulane is on when its History Department is housed in a building named after a segregationist?" The students suggested "Guillory and Elloie Hall" for its new name, after Barbara Marie Guillory and Pearlie Hardin Elloie, the first two students of color to attend Tulane. Tulane's Building Naming Task Force, which was made up of students, faculty, staff and alumni, recommended removing the Hébert name as the designation of the hall if legally possible and the Board of Tulane unanimously voted to authorize Tulane leadership to negotiate with the Hébert family as representatives of the F. Edward Hébert Foundation. However, according to University President Michael A. Fitts, "Tulane was unable to reach an agreement to modify the legal requirement that Hébert's name remain on the building." Beginning in the 2022–23 academic year, Hébert Hall will prominently feature contextual facts regarding the history of its naming.

== See also ==
- List of members of the House Un-American Activities Committee

U.S. House of Representatives
Preceded by Joachim O. Fernández	United States Representative for Louisiana's 1st congressional district 1941 – 1977	Succeeded by Richard Alvin Tonry
Political offices
Preceded by Philip J. Philbin; Massachusetts	Chairman of United States House Committee on Armed Services; 1970–1975	Succeeded by Charles Melvin Price; Illinois
