= Charlie Smith (Louisiana lobbyist) =

American lobbyist

Charles L. Smith (September 9, 1942 – March 1, 2012) was an American lobbyist working in Louisiana.

== Early life and education ==
Charlie Smith was born on September 9, 1942, in Mobile, Alabama. His parents were Fred Lee Smith and Bernice Wainwright Smith.

Smith graduated from Slidell High School and attended Southeastern Louisiana College (now Southeastern Louisiana University). He served as editor of the college newspaper. In 1965, Smith graduated with a degree in journalism.

== Lobbying career ==
Smith began his career as a lobbyist in the 1960s. He is credited with having a significant impact on Louisiana politics.

In 2011, Smith was inducted into the Louisiana Political Hall of Fame. He is the only lobbyist to ever have been inducted.

== Death ==
Smith died on March 1, 2012, from heart disease.
