= Samuel B. Nunez Jr. =

American politician (1930–2012)

Samuel Bernard Nunez Jr.

President of the Louisiana State Senate
- In office 1990–1996
- Preceded by: Allen Bares
- Succeeded by: Randy Ewing
- In office 1983–1988
- Preceded by: Michael H. O'Keefe
- Succeeded by: Allen Bares

President pro tempore of the Louisiana State Senate
- In office 1988–1990
- Preceded by: Thomas H. Hudson
- Succeeded by: Leonard J. Chabert
- In office 1980–1983
- Preceded by: Edgar G. "Sonny" Mouton Jr.
- Succeeded by: Theodore M. Hickey

President of the National Conference of State Legislatures
- In office 1988–1989
- Preceded by: Ted L. Strickland
- Succeeded by: Lee A. Daniels

Louisiana State Senator for District 1 (now Jefferson, Plaquemines, St. Bernard parishes)
- In office 1969–1996
- Preceded by: E. W. Gravolet
- Succeeded by: Lynn Dean

Louisiana State Representative for St. Bernard Parish
- In office 1964–1969
- Preceded by: Elmer R. Tapper
- Succeeded by: Elmer R. Tapper

Personal details
- Born: January 27, 1930 St. Bernard Parish, Louisiana, U.S.
- Died: January 15, 2012 (aged 81) New Orleans, Louisiana, U.S.
- Resting place: St. Bernard Memorial Gardens in Chalmette
- Party: Democratic
- Education: Louisiana State University
- Occupation: Insurance agent

Military service
- Branch/service: United States Air Force

Samuel Bernard Nunez Jr., (January 27, 1930 – January 15, 2012), was a Louisiana politician and businessman from Chalmette, the seat of St. Bernard Parish in the New Orleans suburbs.

From 1964 to 1969, Nunez was a member of the Louisiana House of Representatives. From 1969 to 1996, the Democrat Nunez was a state senator. He was the State Senate President from 1983 to 1988 and from 1990 to 1996, when his legislative tenure ended in defeat. He was the State Senate President Pro Tempore from 1980 to 1983 and 1988 to 1990. In 1973, he was a delegate to the Louisiana State Constitutional Convention, where he pushed for inclusion of the homestead exemption on property taxes.

== Background ==
Nunez graduated from Joseph Maumus High School in Arabi in St. Bernard Parish. From 1951 to 1955, he served in the United States Air Force during the Korean War era. Following his Air Force service, he received a Bachelor of Science degree from Louisiana State University in Baton Rouge.

In 1983, Nunez became Senate President by acclamation when Michael H. O'Keefe of New Orleans was indicted, maintained his innocence, but was ultimately convicted of a federal crime and imprisoned.

== Political career ==
After a month of consideration, Nunez endorsed Breaux over Moore.

Nunez was one of several pro-gambling legislators who were defeated or forced to retire following the 1995 legislative session. Two of Nunez' most prominent Senate colleagues, Armand Brinkhaus of Sunset in St. Landry Parish and Sixty Rayburn of Bogalusa in Washington Parish, lost re-election bids, while Senators Larry Bankston of Baton Rouge and Gerry Hinton of Slidell stood down. Also failing in his re-election bid was Rep. Raymond Lalonde of Sunset, the author of the 1992 bill which allowed for a land-based casino to operate in New Orleans.

Senator Dean served two terms and was succeeded in 2004 by the Republican, later Democrat, Walter Boasso. As a Democrat, Boasso finished a distant second to Republican Bobby Jindal in the 2007 governor's race, as Jindal easily captured the requisite majority n the primary to avoid a runoff.

== Later years and legacy ==
Long after his legislative service, Nunez was a member of the board of commissioners of the Port of New Orleans. He operated an insurance agency.

Louisiana State Senate
Preceded by E. W. "Kelly" Gravolet Jr.	Louisiana State Senator for District 11 (Jefferson, Plaquemines, and St. Bernard parishes); 1969–1996	Succeeded by Lynn Dean
Preceded by Michael H. O'Keefe	President of the Louisiana State Senate; 1983–1988	Succeeded by Allen Bares
Preceded by Allen Bares	President of the Louisiana State Senate; 1990–1996	Succeeded by Randy Lew Ewing
Preceded by Edgar G. "Sonny" Mouton Jr.	Louisiana State Senate President Pro Tempore; 1980–1983	Succeeded by Theodore M. Hickey
Preceded by Thomas H. Hudson	Louisiana State Senate President Pro Tempore; 1988–1990	Succeeded by Leonard J. Chabert
Louisiana House of Representatives
Preceded by Elmer R. Tapper	Louisiana State Representative for St. Bernard Parish; 1964–1969	Succeeded by Elmer R. Tapper
