= Giovanni Battista Bussi =

Giovanni Battista Bussi may refer to:

- Giovanni Battista Bussi (1656–1726), Italian cardinal
- Giovanni Battista Bussi (1755–1844), Italian cardinal
- Giovanni Battista Bussi de Pretis (1721–1800), Italian cardinal
