= Violet, Louisiana =

Census-designated place in Louisiana, US

Violet
- Census-designated place
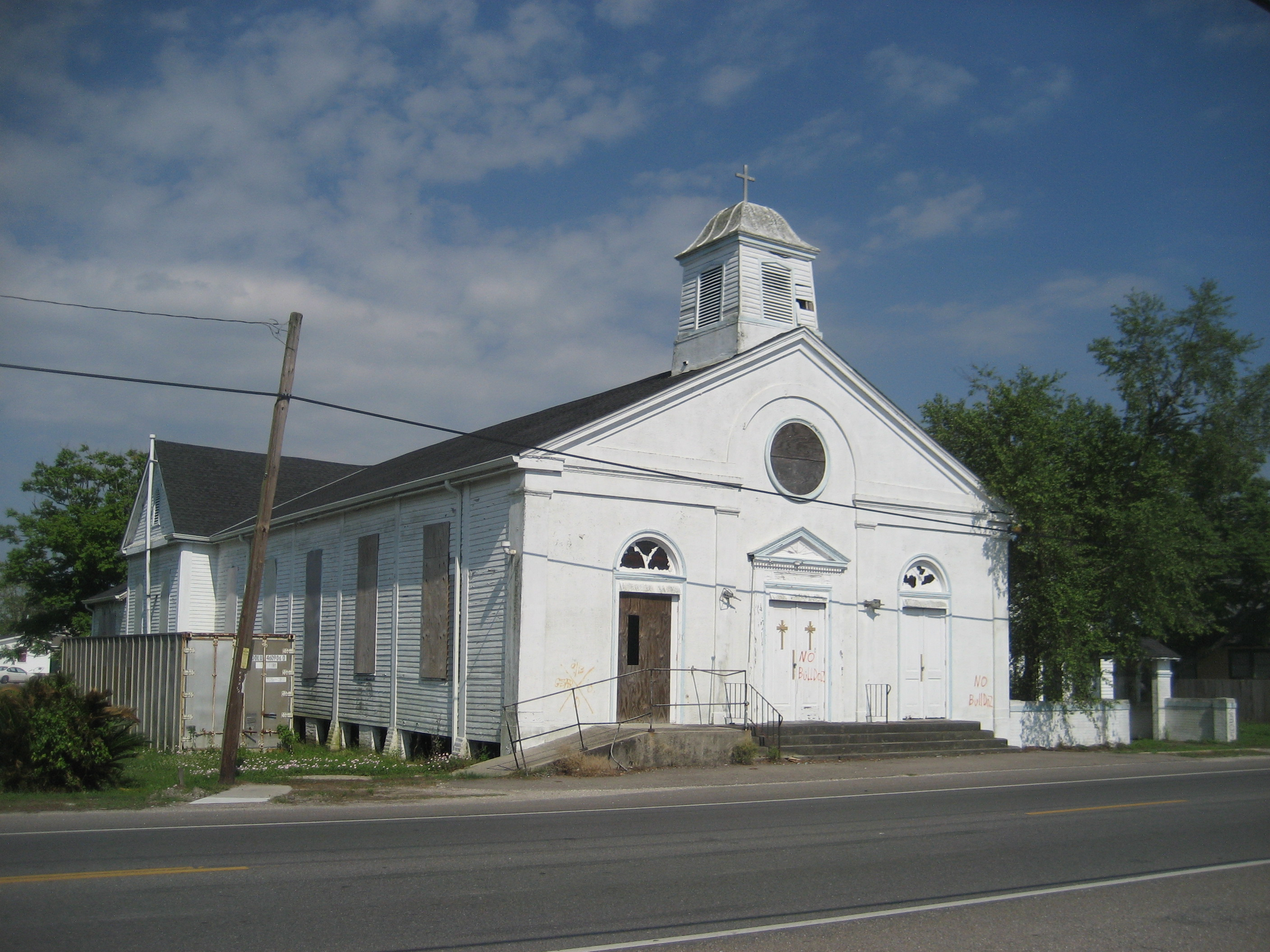
- Old Our Lady of Lourdes Church Building, Violet

- Location in St. Bernard Parish and the state of Louisiana.
- Coordinates: 29°54′04″N 89°53′49″W
- Country: United States
- State: Louisiana
- Parish: St. Bernard

Area
  - Total: 4.58 sq mi (11.85 km^{2})
  - Land: 3.93 sq mi (10.17 km^{2})
  - Water: 0.65 sq mi (1.68 km^{2})
- Elevation: 3 ft (0.91 m)

Population (2020)
  - Total: 5,758
  - Density: 1,466.7/sq mi (566.28/km^{2})
- Time zone: UTC-6 (CST)
  - Summer (DST): UTC-5 (CDT)
- Area code: 504
- FIPS code: 22-78855

Violet is a census-designated place (CDP) in St. Bernard Parish, Louisiana, United States. The population was 5,758 at the 2020 census. Violet is located on the east bank of the Mississippi River, approximately 7.5 miles (12.1 km) southeast of New Orleans and is part of the Greater New Orleans area.

== History ==
The area now known as Violet was originally part of the Livaudais Plantation. Violet sprang up after the development of the Violet Canal. It was named by canal booster Albert Covington Janin, after his wife Violet Blair Janin, a Washington, D.C. socialite and part of the influential Blair family for whom the Blair House across from the White House in Washington D.C. is named. Albert Janin spent his youth in St. Bernard Parish in the large Janin family home. His father, Louis Janin Sr., a prominent lawyer who had immigrated from France to New Orleans in 1828, sent his sons to Europe for their education, including Albert. Albert was a partner with his father's law firm, including the office in Washington, D. C., where he remained after marrying into the Blair family. His and Violet's life together is told in Virginia Jean Laas's book, Love and Power in the Nineteenth Century, the Marriage of Violet Blair.

=== Hurricane Katrina ===
On August 29, 2005, the community was devastated by storm surge and wind associated with Hurricane Katrina which topped the Hurricane Protection Levee and destroyed the Mississippi River-Gulf Outlet Canal (MRGO) levee. Camp Hope housed volunteers assisting residents of St. Bernard Parish in their recovery from Hurricane Katrina. It was located at the W. Smith Elementary School, 6701 E. St. Bernard Highway.

== Geography ==
Violet is located at 29°54′4″N 89°53′49″W (29.901244, -89.896860), in southern Louisiana on the Gulf Coast. According to the United States Census Bureau, the CDP has a total area of 4.5 square miles (11.8 km^{2}), of which 4.1 square miles (10.5 km^{2}) is land and 0.5 square mile (1.2 km^{2}) (10.57%) is water.

== Economy ==
Violet is the proposed location of the Louisiana International Terminal Project, designed to allow the largest of global container ships a location on the lower Mississippi at which to berth.

== Demographics ==
Historical population
Census	Pop.	Note	%±
1980	11,678		—
1990	8,574		−26.6%
2000	8,555		−0.2%
2010	4,973		−41.9%
2020	5,758		15.8%
U.S. Decennial Census; 1950 1960 1970 1980; 1990 2000 2010

Violet first appeared as a census designated place in the 1980 U.S. census.

Violet CDP, Louisiana – Racial and ethnic composition Note: the U.S. Census Bureau treats Hispanic/Latino as an ethnic category. This table excludes Latinos from the racial categories and assigns them to a separate category. Hispanics/Latinos may be of any race.
Race / Ethnicity (NH = Non-Hispanic)	Pop 2000	Pop 2010	Pop 2020	% 2000	% 2010	% 2020
White alone (NH)	4,718	1,862	1,590	55.15%	37.44%	27.61%
Black or African American alone (NH)	3,301	2,740	3,542	38.59%	55.10%	61.51%
Native American or Alaska Native alone (NH)	40	30	34	0.47%	0.60%	0.59%
Asian alone (NH)	49	28	35	0.57%	0.56%	0.61%
Native Hawaiian or Pacific Islander alone (NH)	0	0	0	0.00%	0.00%	0.00%
Other race alone (NH)	1	7	23	0.01%	0.14%	0.40%
Mixed race or Multiracial (NH)	79	73	158	0.92%	1.47%	2.74%
Hispanic or Latino (any race)	367	233	376	4.29%	4.69%	6.53%
Total	8,555	4,973	5,758	100.00%	100.00%	100.00%

At the 2000 United States census, there were 8,555 people, 2,744 households, and 2,266 families residing in the CDP. After Hurricane Katrina struck in 2005, the 2010 U.S. census determined its population declined to 4,973. The 2019 American Community Survey estimated its population rebounded to 5,755. In 2020, its population was 5,758. Among its population, the median age was 37.7, and 73.8% of the population were aged 18 and older. An estimated 6.6% were aged 5 and under, and 13.3% aged 65 and older.

The racial and ethnic makeup of the census-designated place was 64.5% Black and African American, 31.8% non-Hispanic white, 3.1% some other race, and 0.7% two or more races. Hispanic and Latin Americans of any race made up 7.6% of the population. In 2000, the racial makeup of the CDP was 58.29% White American, 38.77% African American, 0.48% Native American, 0.58% Asian, 0.01% Pacific Islander, 0.37% from other races, and 1.48% from two or more races. Hispanic and Latin Americans of any race were 4.29% of the population.

Approximately 8.2% of the population spoke a language other than English at home, and Spanish was the second most-spoken language at the 2019 census-estimates.

The median income for a household was $36,792 and 22.4% of the population lived at or below the poverty line. Males had a median income of $34,732 from 2015 to 2019, versus $23,643 for females. In 2000, the median income for a household in the CDP was $32,993, and the median income for a family was $36,616. Males had a median income of $32,012 versus $24,799 for females.

== Notable people ==
- Elmer R. Tapper, former member of the Louisiana House of Representatives
