= John J. Hainkel Jr. =

American politician (1938–2005)

John Joseph Hainkel Jr.

Louisiana State Representative for Orleans Parish
- In office 1968–1988
- Preceded by: At-large delegation
- Succeeded by: James St. Raymond

Speaker of the Louisiana House of Representatives
- In office 1980–1984
- Preceded by: E. L. Henry
- Succeeded by: John Alario

Louisiana State Senator for District 6 (portions of Jefferson, Orleans, St. Tammany, and Tangipahoa parishes)
- In office 1988–2005
- Preceded by: Thomas A. Casey
- Succeeded by: Julie Quinn

President of the Louisiana State Senate
- In office 2000–2004
- Preceded by: Randy Ewing
- Succeeded by: Donald E. Hines

Personal details
- Born: March 24, 1938 New Orleans, Louisiana, US
- Died: April 15, 2005 (aged 67) Poplarville, Mississippi
- Party: Republican (from mid-1980s)
- Other political affiliations: Democratic (until mid-1980s)
- Spouse: Divorced
- Children: 3
- Education: De La Salle High School; Tulane University; Tulane University Law School
- Occupation: Attorney

John Joseph Hainkel Jr. (March 24, 1938 – April 15, 2005), was a legislator from New Orleans, Louisiana, who died in office after thirty-seven years of service. He was the first person in his state and the second in United States history to have been elected as both Speaker of his state House of Representatives and President of his state Senate.

Louisiana House of Representatives
Preceded by At-large membership	Louisiana State Representative for District 89 (Orleans Parish); John Joseph Hainkel Jr. 1968–1988	Succeeded by James St. Raymond
Preceded by E. L. "Bubba" Henry	Speaker of the Louisiana House of Representatives; John Joseph Hainkel Jr. 1980–1984	Succeeded by John A. Alario Jr.
Louisiana State Senate
Preceded by Thomas A. Casey	Louisiana State Senator for District 6 (portions of Jefferson, Orleans, St. Tammany, and Tangipahoa parishes); John Joseph Hainkel Jr. 1988–2005	Succeeded by Julie Quinn
Preceded by Randy Ewing	President of the Louisiana State Senate; John Joseph Hainkel Jr. 2000–2004	Succeeded by Donald E. Hines
