= Acadian Ambulance =

American private ambulance service

Acadian Ambulance Service, Inc.
- Type: Private
- Industry: Ambulance service
- Founded: Lafayette, Louisiana, 1971
- Founders: Richard Zuschlag (CEO, Chairman of the Board)
- Headquarters: Lafayette, Louisiana, United States
- Key people: Richard Zuschlag (CEO, Chairman of the Board)
- Services: Out-of-hospital medical care
- Owner: Richard Zuschlag and Acadian's Employee-Owners
- Number of employees: 4,000+
- Parent: Acadian Companies
- Divisions: Acadian Ambulance Service, Acadian Air Med, Acadian Total Security, Executive Aircraft Charter Services, National EMS Academy, Safety Management Systems
- Website: www.acadian.com

Acadian Ambulance is an employee-owned private ambulance service that covers most of the state of Louisiana, a large portion of Texas, two counties in Tennessee, and one county in Mississippi. In 1995 it was recognized as the largest privately owned ambulance service in the United States. Today the company responds to emergency and non-emergency calls in Louisiana; Southeast, Central, and North Texas; Jackson County, Mississippi; Nashville and Memphis, Tennessee.

Headquartered in Lafayette, Louisiana, Acadian Ambulance maintains a fleet of more than 400 ground ambulances, as well as eight medical transport helicopters and five fixed-wing aircraft that provide aerial transport to medical facilities.

In addition to emergency medical services, Acadian offers an aircraft charter service, a personal medical alarm service, fire and burglar alarm service, industrial medical personnel, fire and safety technicians, and medical and industrial training, as well as billing software.

== History ==
Acadian was founded by Roland Dugas, Richard Zuschlag, and Rolland Buckner in response to funeral homes ceasing to provide ambulance services because of new, financially burdensome federal guidelines. They decided that it was time to create a private ambulance company and took their idea to the Lafayette Police Jury.

Without the needed funds to get started, they decided to hire former Vietnam War medics to staff their new company, and raise funds through membership subscriptions. On July 21, 1971, the Police Jury authorized Acadian Ambulance Service, Inc. to be the emergency provider for Lafayette Parish. To this day, Acadian uses membership drives to aid funding of the company.

When Acadian first started, they had just 2 ambulances and 8 medics. Roland Dugas was the first president. At 12:01 a.m. on September 1, 1971, when funeral homes ceased services, Acadian Ambulance Service went live with a membership of 8,400 households.

Over the next year, Acadian grew to a fleet of 8 ambulances, and moved into about 26,000 households. In 1972, Acadian expanded service into St. Mary and Vermilion Parishes. They soon put in a model dispatch system, of which other companies would follow.

In 1973, Acadian moved into Acadia, Jefferson Davis, St. Martin, and Terrebonne Parishes, along with the city of Eunice. Membership levels grew to 70,648. In 1974, Acadian built a new headquarters in Lafayette with a state of the art Emergency Medical Dispatch Center. The company now had 100 employees, including 75 EMTs as it moved into Evangeline and Iberia Parishes. By 1975, they had 33 ambulances, and 80,216 households covered.

In 1976, Acadian expanded their EMT training, formalizing it and fully certifying employees through the National Registry of Emergency Medical Technicians and the state of Louisiana. In 1979, membership reached 100,000 households. That year brought the expansion into Assumption Parish, and an expansion to their telemetry system, including transmissions of EKGs to hospital rooms from almost anywhere in the service area.

Over the past four decades, Acadian Ambulance continued to grow its service area by utilizing anti-competitive practices such as acquiring legal monopoly clauses or taking legal action to prevent competition in many of the parishes and counties that it serves. Acadian now encompasses the majority of parishes in Louisiana, 34 counties in Texas and two counties in Mississippi, and the Memphis and Nashville areas in Tennessee. The company also expanded into six distinct divisions, with patients, clients and customers around the globe.

== Acadian companies ==
After starting out in 1971 as a small ambulance company in Lafayette, Louisiana, Acadian Ambulance has grown into a larger, multi-division company.

Today, Acadian has more than 4,000 employees across six divisions—ranging from Nationally Registered Emergency Medical Technicians and pilots to health, safety, and security professional and support staff. The Acadian fleet includes more than 400 ground ambulances, helicopters, and fixed-wing aircraft.

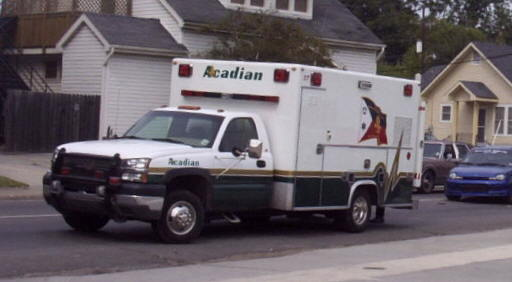
An Acadian ambulance at the scene of an emergency

Acadian Ambulance Service

Acadian Ambulance Service began operations in 1971, in response to a sudden crisis. Communities around the country found themselves without emergency medical transportation when new federal regulations caused funeral homes to discontinue using their hearses for emergency transport.

These regulations went into effect at midnight on September 1, 1971. At 12:01 a.m., Acadian Ambulance began its Louisiana operations with three young co-founders, two ambulances, eight medics, and 279 square miles of Lafayette Parish to cover. Air Med Services Surrounding parishes became interested in having Acadian Ambulance's pre-hospital emergency care and soon invitations to serve came in from other areas. Louisiana's diverse geography of rich swamps and marshlands, and extensive rural areas, made navigation in a ground ambulance an often difficult task.

Air Med

To address the challenge of an expanded population and geographical service area, Acadian Ambulance expanded to include Air Med Services in 1981, which hosted the first medical helicopter based in Lafayette, Louisiana. This allowed Acadian Ambulance to quickly access onshore and offshore emergency situations. By 1989, Air Med had also acquired fixed wing aircraft for extended emergency and non-emergency air medical transports. Air Med and Executive Air Charter currently operate several King Air aircraft and a Lear 45 jet aircraft.

Executive Aircraft Charter Service

Eventually the fixed wing fleet of Air Med would progress into Executive Aircraft Charter Service; since only a handful of air medical flights are scheduled per week, the interior of the aircraft can be easily reconfigured and utilized for business or pleasure flights throughout North America.

Safety Management Systems

At its inception, Air Med was the first aero-medical provider in the Gulf of Mexico with helicopters equipped like a hospital emergency room and flight paramedics. This enhanced the safety of offshore workers and Acadian also began providing contract medics to work shifts on oil installations offshore soon after.

The duality of these developments led to partnerships with the oil & gas companies, which in turn evolved into Safety Management Systems, Acadian's health, safety, environmental, medical, security and training service company.

Today, SMS claims to be one of the largest providers of these services in the industry and caters to an array of industrial safety needs, such as: safety and regulatory compliance training, health and wellness testing and specialized programs, and remote paramedics.

Acadian Total Security

Acadian Monitoring Services was born in 1991 as Acadian On Call. Acadian Monitoring Services currently offers personal medical alerts, mobile monitoring, GPS tracking and fleet safety services, video security services, access control, security monitoring, and telehealth monitoring through three call centers.

In 2014, Acadian expanded its security monitoring division and began offering security systems, advanced video services and access control systems directly to consumers.

National EMS Academy

Because most ambulance services were unregulated before 1970, Acadian became one of the first companies to train EMTs. Acadian's 700-hour National Registry paramedic course was one of the first of its kind offered in Louisiana. In-house EMS education continued over the next three decades as Acadian's medical education department trained medics and offered the continuing education hours EMTs needed to recertify.

However, along with the growth of the company came a corresponding shortage of paramedics. With this in mind, the National EMS Academy was launched in 2003 through collaboration with South Louisiana Community College, so Acadian could educate its own medics.

== Legal problems and lawsuits ==
On March 26, 1998, US Attorney Mike Skinner announced that Acadian Ambulance had agreed to pay the federal government $1.9 million to settle a lawsuit that charged the Lafayette company with overbilling the Medicare and Medicaid programs from 1990 to 1994 by offering a greater discount to members than allowed by law. The Company did not incur penalties and no finding of fraud was found..

Following her total left hip arthroplasty in June 2000, Gaye Cryar was being moved from her hospital bed to the stretcher of an Acadian Ambulance to transfer her to a rehabilitation hospital. The Acadian Ambulance crew dropped the patient, causing a re-injury and an acute fracture of the acetabulum and dislocation of the hip prosthesis. Acadian won summary judgement in the trial court but the Louisiana Court of Appeals, Third Circuit, reversed the summary judgment on May 31, 2006, saying, "[the] increasing complaints after the patient reported a rough transfer from bed to stretcher at Women's, this evidence is sufficient to raise a material issue of fact as to how, when, and where the fracture occurred, as well as to the possible fault of Women's and Acadian Ambulance."

On December 27, 2010, while transporting a pregnant patient, an Acadian Ambulance unit collided into the rear of a sugar cane truck near Brusly, Louisiana. The patient they were transporting did deliver her baby through Caesarean section, but remained critically injured. The lawsuit following the crash, Peggy Ross, et al. v. Michael Averette, et al., resulted in jury awarding $116,939,241 in damages on August 1, 2012. However the case was ultimately settled for substantially below that amount.

During Hurricane Katrina, Acadian Ambulance was contracted to provide ambulance service in St. Bernard Parish, Louisiana. Prior to landfall, they were notified of multiple requests to evacuate hospitals as well as home-bound patients, including Dorothy Hingle, 83, and her son, Russell Embry, 54, from their home due to the pending hurricane. They contacted Ms. Hingle as well also others on the list on August 26, 2005, and confirmed they still needed to be evacuated as they had arrived at other homes and the individuals had already left by other means. On August 27, 2005, as the winds picked up and travel became unsafe, they called Ms. Hingle back stating they would not be able to evacuate them. Ms. Hingle and Mr. Embry drowned when their home was covered by flooding as a result of the levee failures.

Acadian was sued for negligence in Cooley V. Acadian Ambulance (2010-CA-1229, LA Ct. App., 4th Circ.). On June 11, 2009, Acadian Ambulance agreed to an undisclosed settlement with the family.

On December 12, 2012, Acadian Ambulance was ordered to pay $17 million in a class action lawsuit against them by 12th Judicial District Judge Mark Jeansonne. Keisha Desselle, et al. vs. Acadian Ambulance Service (No. 2010-5885 "A": Avoyelles Parish) was filed on October 25, 2010, in response to Acadian filing liens against accident victim's insurance settlements or civil awards allegedly in violation of LSA-R.S. 22:1874.

Acadian Ambulance appealed the trial court’s ruling and the plaintiffs agreed to settle the class action lawsuit for less than $5 million in June, 2014. The suit alleged that Acadian could only charge the auto insurer of the negligent driver the same amount it would have billed the injured patient's contracted health insurance provider. Acadian denied any wrongdoing, in that it had contracted with the health provider not the at fault driver’s car insurers for discounted rates. It applied to services provided to certain patients between January 1, 1994, and December 31, 2013.
