= Raymond Blanco =

American academic administrator (1935–2022)

First Gentleman of Louisiana
- In role January 12, 2004 – January 14, 2008
- Governor: Kathleen Blanco
- Preceded by: Alice Foster
- Succeeded by: Supriya Jindal (First Lady)

Second Gentleman of Louisiana
- In role January 8, 1996 – January 12, 2004
- Governor: Mike Foster
- Preceded by: John Schwegmann
- Succeeded by: Cheryl Landrieu (Second Lady)

Personal details
- Born: Raymond Sindo Blanco; August 16, 1935 Birmingham, Alabama, U.S.
- Died: November 19, 2022 (aged 87)
- Spouse: Kathleen Blanco (m. 1964; died 2019)
- Children: 6
- Education: St. Benedict's College (B.A. 1958)

Raymond Sindo Blanco (August 16, 1935 – November 19, 2022) was an American academic administrator and football coach who served as the First Gentleman of Louisiana from 2004 to 2008 during the gubernatorial tenure of his wife, then Governor of Louisiana Kathleen Blanco. Blanco, the first man to serve as First Gentleman of Louisiana, was also nicknamed "First Coach" during his tenure in the position.

Blanco worked as an administrator at the University of Louisiana at Lafayette from 1982 until his retirement in 2009. He served as vice president for student affairs, responsible for coordinating various non-academic departments which relate directly to UL Lafayette students. He also served as a link between the student body and the university. He was known as "Coach" on the campus of UL Lafayette.

== Early life ==
Raymond Blanco was born and raised in Birmingham, Alabama. He received his Bachelor of Arts in philosophy and political science from the former St. Benedict's College (now part of Benedictine College) in Atchison, Kansas, in 1958.

In football, Blanco served as assistant coach at Kirwin High School in Galveston, Texas, and head coach at Catholic High School in New Iberia, Louisiana, between 1958 and 1962. In 1962 he led the Catholic High team to win the state championship. From 1963 to 1969, Blanco served as assistant coach at then-University of Southwestern Louisiana (USL), under the direction of coach Russ Faulkinberry.

In 1969, he became Dean of Men. With the merger of the offices of the Dean of Men and Dean of Women, Blanco was named as USL's Dean of Student Personnel in 1972. In 1974 he became the Chief Student Officer for the university functioning as the Dean of Students and overseeing the operations of the entire student welfare area. As member of the University Council, he was responsible for the operations of the following areas: Student Personnel, University Police, Student Union, Counseling and Testing, International Students, Housing, Child Development Center, Career Services, Parking and Transit, One Card System, Intramurals, Student Health Services, Student Athlete Center, Physical Plant, Student Government, Campus Organizations, and Student Publications. From the fall of 1982 on, Mr. Blanco served in the capacity of Vice President for Student Affairs.

Blanco's transition from football coach to Dean of Men came as a result of the university's need to find an administrator capable of understanding and quelling the severe student unrest which plagued USL (and universities around the country) in the late 1960s and early 1970s.
