= Victor Bussie =

American labor leader and politician

- Born: January 27, 1919; Montrose, Louisiana
- Died: August 4, 2011 (aged 92); Baton Rouge, Louisiana
- Title: President, Louisiana AFL-CIO
- Term: 1956-1997
- Political party: Democratic Party

Victor Bussie (January 27, 1919 – September 4, 2011) was an American labor leader and politician who served as the president of the Louisiana AFL-CIO for 41 years from 1956 to his retirement in 1997. Bussie was born in Montrose, LA and first worked as a firefighter where he was a member of the Shreveport Professional Firefighters Union 514.

== Boards and Commissions ==
He served on the boards of both the University of Louisiana System. and Louisiana State University System: which constitute both of the public 4-year degree systems in the state. He also served on the Louisiana Commission on Governmental Ethics and the Baton Rouge Police and Firefighters Civil Service Board. Bussie, additionally, served as a Director of the Federal Reserve Bank of Atlanta's New Orleans Branch.

== Right to Work ==
As most labor leaders Bussie opposed right to work laws but following the successful passage of such a law in Louisiana, under former Louisiana Governor Robert F. Kennon, he worked to implement a politically crude solution to eradicate it mostly by convincing the legislature to repeal right to work and simultaneously reinstate it only for farmers.

In reaction to the agricultural right to work legislation pushed by Bussie, Eleanor Roosevelt wrote an editorial saying in part: "This situation in Louisiana is of interest to farmers all over the country. In the last few years we have lost a large number of family-type farms. One of the reasons for this is that the man who runs his own farm finds it practically impossible to compete with big corporate agricultural farming, where workers are exploited and where production is on such a large scale that everything—buying, selling and production—can be done more cheaply than by any family-type farm".
