= Senate Centrist Coalition =

The Senate Centrist Coalition was a bipartisan caucus of moderate United States Senators. Founded by John Breaux (D-LA) and John Chafee (R-RI) in 1994, the group had 33 members by 2002. It sought bipartisan agreements on issues, such as a balanced budget, welfare reform, and healthcare reform.

== Coalition Members (109th Congress) ==
- Evan Bayh (D-IN)
- Tom Carper (D-DE)
- Susan Collins (R-ME)
- Kent Conrad (D-ND)
- Dianne Feinstein (D-CA)
- Judd Gregg (R-NH)
- Herb Kohl (D-WI)
- Mary Landrieu (D-LA)
- Joseph Lieberman (I-CT)
- Blanche Lincoln (D-AR)
- John McCain (R-AZ)
- Ben Nelson (D-NE)
- Bill Nelson (D-FL)
- Mark Pryor (D-AR)
- Richard Shelby (R-AL)
- Olympia Snowe (R-ME)
- George Voinovich (R-OH)

== See also ==
- New Democrats
- Third Way
