= 1996 United States Senate election in Louisiana =

- September 21, 1996 (first round); November 5, 1996 (runoff)
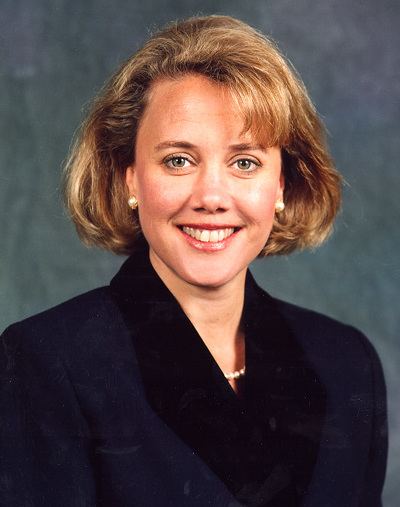

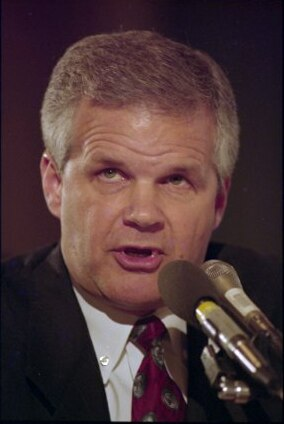

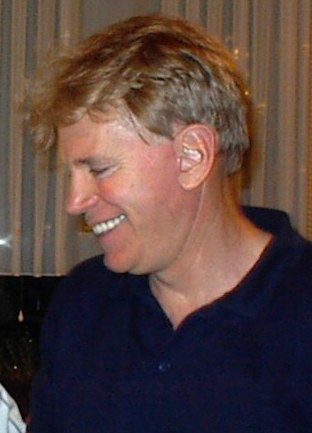

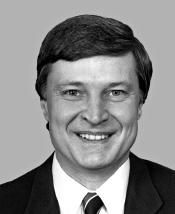
Nominee	Mary Landrieu	Woody Jenkins	Richard Ieyoub
Party	Democratic	Republican	Democratic
First round	264,268; 21.51%	322,244; 26.23%	250,682; 20.4%
Runoff	852,945; 50.17%	847,157; 49.83%	Eliminated
Nominee	David Duke	Jimmy Hayes
Party	Republican	Republican
First round	141,489; 11.52%	71,699; 5.84%
Runoff	Eliminated	Eliminated
- Landrieu: 20–30% 50–60% 60–70% 70–80% Jenkins: 20–30% 30–40% 40–50% 50–60% 60–70% Ieyoub: 20–30% 30–40% Duke: 10—20% 20–30% Hayes: 20–30%
U.S. senator before election
J. Bennett Johnston
Democratic
Elected U.S. Senator
Mary Landrieu
Democratic

The 1996 Louisiana United States Senate election was held on November 5, 1996, to select a new U.S. senator from the state of Louisiana to replace the retiring John Bennett Johnston, Jr. of Shreveport. After the jungle primary election, state treasurer Mary Landrieu entered into a runoff election with State Representative Woody Jenkins of Baton Rouge, a former Democrat who had turned Republican two years earlier.

Landrieu prevailed by 5,788 votes out of 1.7 million cast, a margin of 0.34 percentage points, making this the closest race of the 1996 Senate election cycle and one of the closest elections in Louisiana history.

Landrieu was the first woman elected to the United States Senate from Louisiana since Rose Long in 1936, and the first woman ever elected to a full term representing the state. In the concurrent presidential election, Democrat Bill Clinton carried Louisiana over Republican Bob Dole by a considerable margin of 927,837 votes to 712,586.

== Jungle primary ==
The multi-candidate field for the primary included Democratic state Attorney General Richard Ieyoub and David Duke, the former Grand Wizard of the Ku Klux Klan, running again as a Republican. Among the minor candidates were Peggy Wilson, an at-large member of the New Orleans City Council, and Troyce Guice, who had sought the same seat 30 years earlier when it was held by the veteran Senator Allen J. Ellender.

Louisiana United States Senate jungle primary election, September 21, 1996
Party	Candidate	Votes	%
Republican	Woody Jenkins	322,244	26.23%
Democratic	Mary Landrieu	264,268	21.51%
Democratic	Richard Ieyoub	250,682	20.41%
Republican	David Duke	141,489	11.52%
Republican	Jimmy Hayes	71,699	5.84%
Republican	Bill Linder	58,243	4.74%
Republican	Chuck McMains	45,164	3.68%
Republican	Peggy Wilson	31,877	2.59%
Democratic	Troyce Guice	15,277	1.24%
Independent	Nicholas J. Accardo	10,035	0.82%
Independent	Arthur D. "Jim" Nichols	7,894	0.64%
Democratic	Sadie Roberts-Joseph	4,660	0.38%
Independent	Tom Kirk	1,987	0.16%
Independent	Darryl Paul Ward	1,770	0.14%
Independent	Sam Houston Melton, Jr.	1,270	0.1%
Turnout		1,228,559	100%

== Runoff election ==
Louisiana United States Senate election, 1996
Party	Candidate	Votes	%	±%
Democratic	Mary Landrieu	852,945	50.17%	
Republican	Woody Jenkins	847,157	49.83%	
Majority		5,788	0.34%	
Turnout		1,700,102	100%	
Democratic hold				

== Allegations of election fraud ==
Landrieu carried the Democratic stronghold of New Orleans by about 100,000 votes; in the days after the runoff election, Jenkins's campaign manager Tony Perkins alleged voting irregularities there.

Jenkins refused to concede and claimed to have received many complaints about election fraud in New Orleans for incidents such as vote hauling and participation by unregistered voters. In April 1997, Jenkins appeared before the Republican-controlled U.S. Senate and petitioned for Landrieu's unseating pending a new election. In a party-line 8–7 vote, the Senate Rules Committee agreed to investigate the charges.

Only a month into the probe, however, it emerged that Thomas "Papa Bear" Miller, a detective hired by Jenkins to investigate claims of fraud, had coached witnesses to claim they had participated in election fraud. Three witnesses claimed Miller had paid them to claim that they had either cast multiple votes for Landrieu or drove vans of illegal voters across town. The others told such bizarre tales that FBI agents dismissed their claims out of hand. It also emerged that Miller had several felony convictions on his record, including a guilty plea to attempted murder. The Democrats walked out of the probe in protest, but the probe continued.

The investigation dragged on for over ten months, angering the Democrats and exacerbating partisan friction in the day-to-day sessions of the Senate Agriculture, Nutrition and Forestry Committee to which Landrieu was assigned as a freshman member of the 105th Congress. Finally, in October 1997, the Rules Committee concluded that while there were major electoral irregularities, none of them were serious enough to burden Louisiana with a new election at that stage. It recommended that the results stand.

The Landrieu-Jenkins contest was not the only U.S. Senate election in 20th century Louisiana in which the results were hotly disputed. In 1918, future Senator John H. Overton claimed the renomination and hence reelection of Senator Joseph E. Ransdell was tainted by fraud. In 1932, Senator Edwin S. Broussard claimed that his primary defeat by Overton was fraudulent. In both cases, the Senate seated the certified winners, Ransdell and Overton, respectively.

== See also ==
- 1996 United States Senate elections
