= Senator Breaux (disambiguation) =

John Breaux (born 1944) was a U.S. Senator from Louisiana from 1987 to 2005. Senator Breaux may also refer to:

- Billie Breaux (born 1936), Indiana State Senate
- Jean Breaux (1958–2024), Indiana State Senate
