= Woody Jenkins =

American politician and newspaper editor (born 1947)

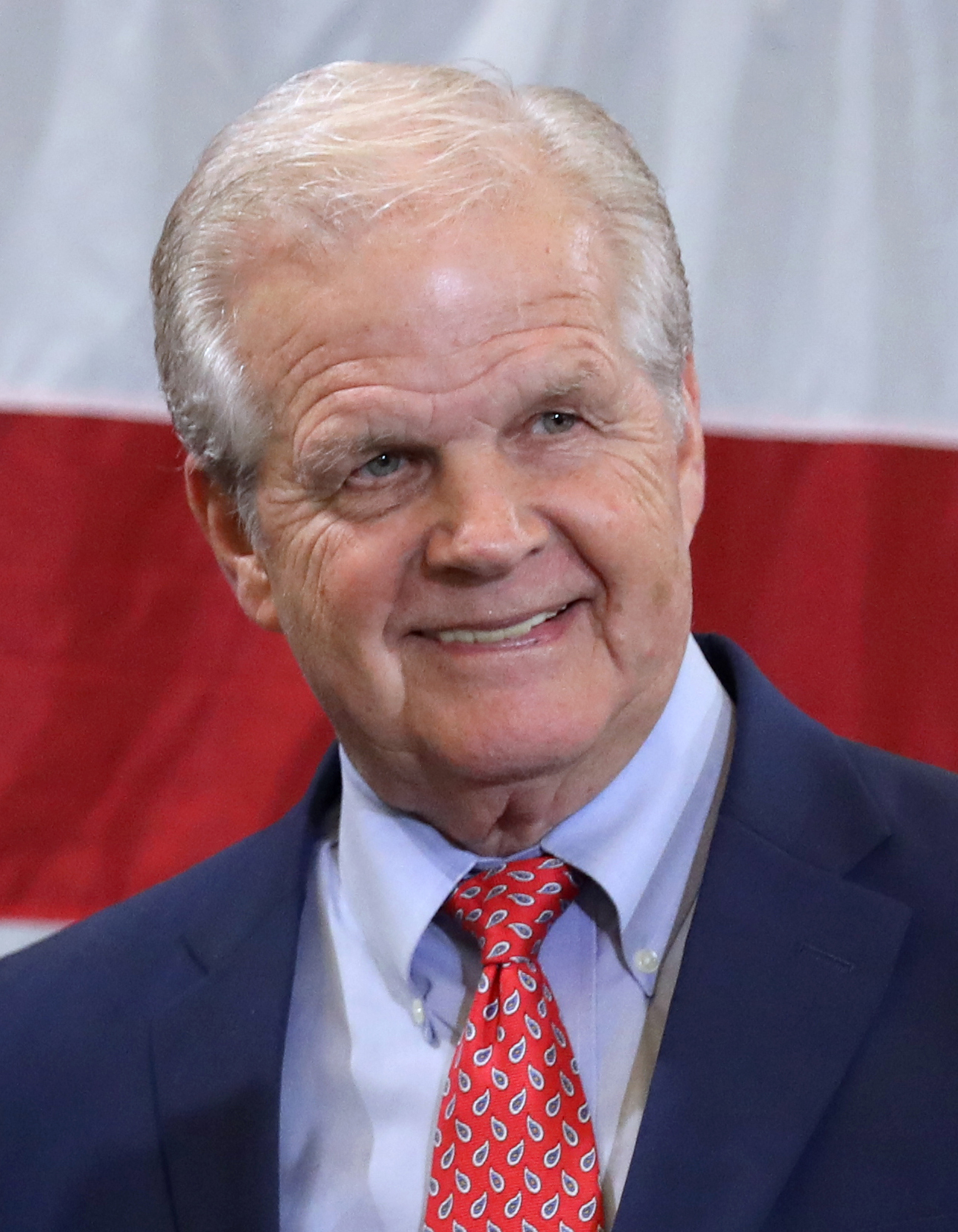

Member of the Louisiana House of Representatives from the East Baton Rouge Parish district
- In office 1972–2000
- Preceded by: At-large members: Irving R. Boudreaux, Richard Cheek, Carl Dawson, Smokey Delaroderie, Chris Faser, Eugene McGehee, Lillian Walker
- Succeeded by: Mike Futrell

Personal details
- Born: Louis Elwood Jenkins Jr. January 3, 1947 (age 79) Baton Rouge, Louisiana, U.S.
- Party: Republican (before 1971, 1994–present); Democratic (1971–1994)
- Spouse: Diane Jenkins
- Education: Louisiana State University (BA, JD)

Louis Elwood Jenkins Jr., known as Woody Jenkins (born January 3, 1947), is an American newspaper editor in Baton Rouge and Central City, Louisiana, who served as a member of the Louisiana House of Representatives from 1972 to 2000 and waged three unsuccessful races for the United States Senate in 1978, 1980, and 1996.

== Early life ==
Jenkins was born on January 3, 1947, in Baton Rouge, Louisiana, to Louis Elwood Jenkins Sr. and Doris Rowlett. He graduated from the Louisiana State University in 1969 with a Bachelor of Arts in journalism.

== State constitutional convention ==
Jenkins was elected as a delegate to Louisiana's state constitutional convention, which met from late 1972 to early 1974. His colleagues included fellow Representative R. Harmon Drew Sr., future Governor Buddy Roemer and later Secretary of State and Insurance Commissioner James H. "Jim" Brown. He served on the convention's Committee on Bill of Rights and Elections, and he authored much of the new constitution's Declaration of Rights. The proposed constitution was approved by the delegates and ratified by the voters in a statewide election held in April 1974. Formally coming into force in 1975, the document is still in effect, though it has been subsequently amended.

== Other political ventures ==
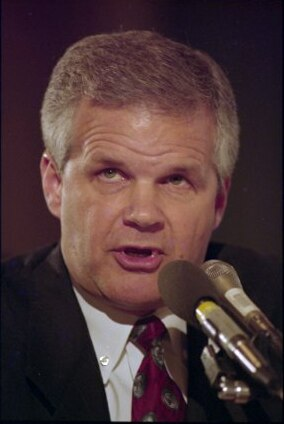
Jenkins testifies before the Senate Rules and Administration Committee in 1997

When Republicans failed to field candidates for the United States Senate in 1978 against the incumbent Democrat J. Bennett Johnston Jr., and again in 1980 against Russell B. Long, Jenkins opposed both incumbents, himself running as a Democrat. In a campaign appearance in Minden in Webster Parish, Jenkins vowed to secure funds for the Louisiana Army Ammunition Plant, which has since closed, and Barksdale Air Force Base in Bossier City. He claimed that Johnston had voted "too closely" with proposals advanced by U.S. President Jimmy Carter. He questioned why Johnston had voted to divert intrastate natural gas from Louisiana industries to residential areas in such states as New York and Ohio.

In 1976, Jenkins and Dan Richey of Ferriday in Concordia Parish were the only House members to oppose the state appropriations bill, which passed 88–2. Richey stumped for Jenkins during his 1978 and 1980 U.S. Senate election runs, and Jenkins returned the favor by campaigning for Richey's election to the state Senate in 1979.

In 1981, Jenkins and later U.S. Representative Clyde C. Holloway of Rapides Parish, one of the four parishes that Jenkins had carried in his 1980 Senate race against Russell Long, spoke at a rally in Alexandria. There the two endorsed proposed constitutional amendments to halt forced bussing for the purpose of desegregating public schools and to require the election, instead of presidential appointment and U.S. Senate confirmation, of U.S. judges. Jenkins told the rally:

What we need in America is a constitutional amendment against forced bussing, and any American who says he is against bussing and won't support a constitutional amendment is a liar.

== U.S. House special election, 2008 ==
On January 16, 2008, U.S. Representative Richard Hugh Baker, representing Louisiana's 6th congressional district, announced that he would soon resign from Congress. The political careers of Jenkins and Baker actually began on the same day thirty-four years earlier in 1972, when both were freshman Democratic members of the East Baton Rouge Parish state House delegation.

On January 17, 2008, Jenkins announced his candidacy for the GOP nomination in the special election. Jenkins received the endorsements of Pat Toomey's Club for Growth Political Action Committee, and Dr. James Dobson, founder of Focus on the Family. He also received the endorsement of the East Baton Rouge Parish Republican Party. Jenkins later received the endorsement of the NRA Political Victory Fund.

In the primary, he faced Paul Sawyer, Baker's congressional aide, Laurinda L. Calongne, president of Robert Rose Consulting; and Michael Cloonan, a veteran of the United States Navy from East Feliciana Parish.

Jenkins led in public opinion polls prior to the primary but fell eighty-four votes short of an outright majority to win the GOP nomination. Calongne, with 7,584 ballots (25 percent), finished second and forced Jenkins, with 14,849 votes (just under 50 percent), into a runoff. Sawyer trailed with 6,924 (23 percent). Cloonan held the critical balance of 425 votes (1 percent).

In the April 5 Republican runoff against Calongne, Jenkins won handily, taking 15,179 (62 percent) of the vote to Calongne's 9,327 (38 percent) votes. He faced Democratic State Representative Don Cazayoux of New Roads in the special election. Jenkins was immediately endorsed by Governor Jindal.

In Congress, Senator David Vitter and the three Republicans in Louisiana's House delegation – Jim McCrery, Rodney Alexander, and Charles Boustany endorsed Jenkins. Jenkins was also supported by House Minority Leader John Boehner, Minority Whip Roy Blunt, and Assistant Whip Eric Cantor. On April 25, former U.S. Senator John Breaux, now a resident of Maryland, endorsed Cazayoux on grounds that the self-styled "John Breaux Democrat" could work across party lines. In 1996, Breaux had also opposed Jenkins in the race against Mary Landrieu.

Before the 1996 Senate general election, Jenkins' campaign retained a firm to do automated phone calls to voters. The firm had previously done work for David Duke, a white supremacist and fellow Republican candidate in the primary for the 1996 senate election. He was fined $3,000 by the Federal Election Commission because the purchase was paid for by his ad agency instead of directly by the campaign. Later Jenkins learned that Duke received a commission from the firm he had hired, but Jenkins insisted that he had no knowledge that Duke would profit from the transaction. However, his signed agreement with the FEC admitted that he knew Duke had used the same firm.

== Later developments ==
=== Election denialism ===
In the Fall of 2020 and Winter of 2020/2021, Jenkins published a series of articles supportive of the stolen-election claims being made by former President Donald Trump and his supporters.

== Electoral history ==
=== 1996 US Senate election in Louisiana ===
Primary, September 21, 1996
Party	Candidate	Votes	%
Republican	Woody Jenkins	322,244	26.23
Democratic	Mary Landrieu	264,268	21.51
Democratic	Richard Ieyoub	250,682	20.41
Republican	David Duke	141,489	11.52
Republican	Jimmy Hayes	71,699	5.84
Republican	Bill Linder	58,243	4.74
Republican	Chuck McMains	45,164	3.68
Republican	Peggy Wilson	31,877	2.6
Democratic	Troyce Guice	15,277	1.24
Other	Nicholas J. Accardo	10,035	0.82
Other	Arthur D. "Jim" Nichols	7,894	0.64
Democratic	Sadie Roberts-Joseph	4,660	0.38
Other	Tom Kirk	1,987	0.16
Other	Darryl Paul Ward	1,770	0.14
Other	Sam Houston Melton Jr.	1,270	0.1
Total		1,228,559	100
Runoff, November 5, 1996
Party	Candidate	Votes	%
Democratic	Mary Landrieu	852,945	50.17
Republican	Woody Jenkins	847,157	49.83
Total		1,700,102	100
Democratic hold			

=== Louisiana's 6th congressional district special election, 2008 ===
Republican primary, March 1, 2008
Party	Candidate	Votes	%
Republican	Woody Jenkins	14,900	49.87
Republican	Laurinda L. Calongne	7,609	25.47
Republican	Paul Sawyer	6,939	23.23
Republican	Michael Cloonan	427	1.43
Total		29,875	100
Republican primary runoff, April 5, 2008
Party	Candidate	Votes	%
Republican	Woody Jenkins	15,179	61.94
Republican	Laurinda L. Calongne	9,327	38.06
Total		24,506	100
General election, May 3, 2008
Party	Candidate	Votes	%
Democratic	Don Cazayoux	49,702	49.20
Republican	Woody Jenkins	46,741	46.27
None	Ashley Casey	3,718	3.68
None	Peter J. Aranyosi	448	0.44
Other	Randall T. Hayes	402	0.40
Total		101,011	100
Democratic gain from Republican			

== See also ==
- List of American politicians who switched parties in office
- Louisiana's 6th congressional district special election, 2008

Party political offices
Preceded by David Duke	Republican nominee for U.S. Senator from Louisiana (Class 2); 1996	Succeeded by Suzanne Haik Terrell
