= Clyde F. Bel Jr. =

American politician (1932–2014)

- Bel's picture from his The Times-Picayune/The New Orleans Advocate obituary

Member of the Louisiana House of Representatives from the 28th district
- In office 1968–1972
- Succeeded by: Thomas A. Casey

Member of the Louisiana House of Representatives from the 90th district
- In office 1976–1980
- Preceded by: Thomas A. Casey
- Succeeded by: Mary Landrieu

Personal details
- Born: Clyde Francis Bel Jr. June 11, 1932 New Orleans, Louisiana, U.S.
- Died: September 6, 2014 (aged 82)
- Party: Democratic
- Spouse: Meryl Ann Wiedemann
- Children: 5
- Parent: Clyde F. Bel Sr. (father)
- Education: Louisiana State University

Clyde Francis Bel Jr. (June 11, 1932 – September 6, 2014) was an American politician. He served as a Democratic member for the 28th and 90th district of the Louisiana House of Representatives.

Bel was born in New Orleans, Louisiana, the son of Carmelita Killelea and Clyde F. Bel Sr., a politician. He attended the Jesuit High School, graduating in 1951. He then attended Louisiana State University. In 1968, Bel was elected for the 28th district of the Louisiana House of Representatives. He was succeeded by Thomas A. Casey in 1972. In 1976, Bel was elected for the 90th district, succeeded Casey and being succeeded by Mary Landrieu in 1980.

He died in September 2014, at the age of 82.
