= 1992 United States Senate election in Louisiana =

- October 3, 1992
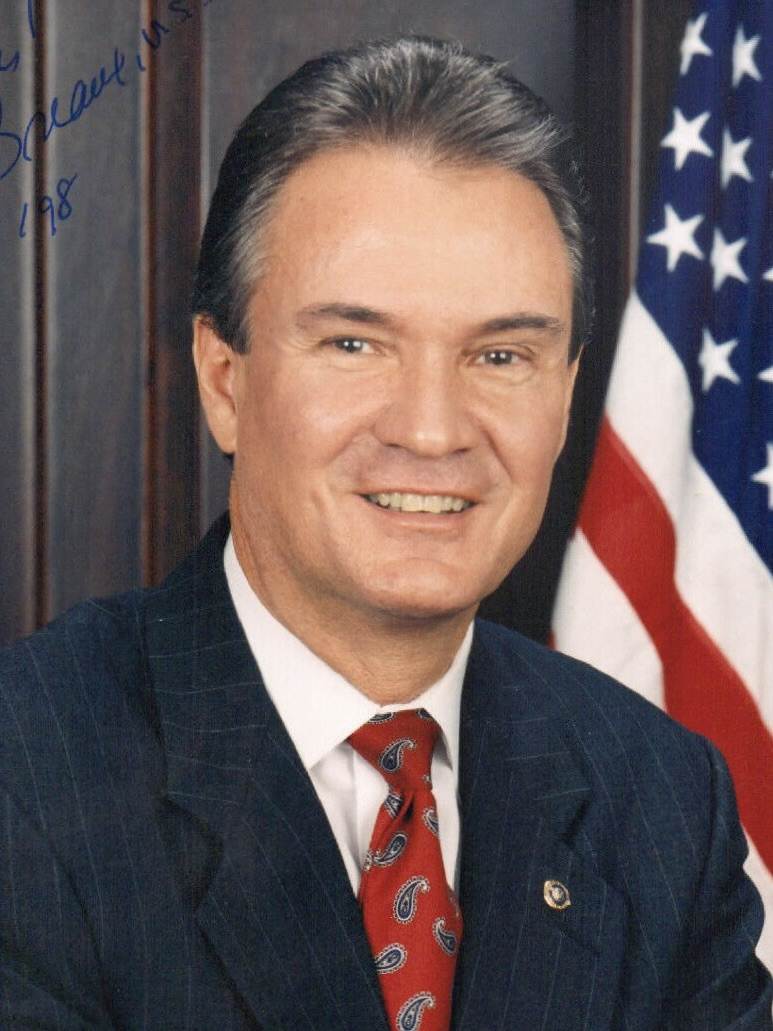

Candidate	John Breaux	Jon Khachaturian
Party	Democratic	Independent
Popular vote	616,021	74,785
Percentage	73.07%	8.87%
Candidate	Lyle Stocksill	Nick Joseph Accardo
Party	Republican	Democratic
Popular vote	69,986	45,839
Percentage	8.30%	5.44%
- Parish results Breaux: 50–60% 60–70% 70–80% 80–90%
U.S. senator before election
John Breaux
Democratic
Elected U.S. Senator
John Breaux
Democratic

The 1992 United States Senate election in Louisiana was held on October 3, 1992. Incumbent United States Senator John Breaux won a majority in Louisiana's jungle primary, avoiding a runoff on Tuesday November 3, and winning reelection to another term.

== Primary election ==
=== Candidates ===
- Nick Joseph Accardo (Democratic)
- John Breaux, incumbent U.S. Senator since 1987 (Democratic)
- Jon Khachaturian (Independent)
- Lyle Stocksill (Republican)
- Fred Clegg Strong (Republican)

=== Results ===
Jungle primary results
Party	Candidate	Votes	%
Democratic	John Breaux (incumbent)	616,021	73.07%
Independent	Jon Khachaturian	74,785	8.87%
Republican	Lyle Stocksill	69,986	8.3%
Democratic	Nick Joseph Accardo	45,839	5.44%
Republican	Fred Clegg Strong	36,406	4.32%
Majority		541,236	64.2%
Turnout		843,037	100%
Democratic hold			

== See also ==
- 1992 United States Senate elections
