= United States Senate Special Committee on Aging =

Senate subcommittee on elderly issues and rights

Senate Aging Committee
Special Committee
- United States Senate; 119th Congress

History
- Formed: February 13, 1961

Leadership
- Chair: Rick Scott (R); Since January 3, 2025
- Ranking Member: Kirsten Gillibrand (D); Since January 3, 2025

Structure
- Political parties: Majority (7): Republican (7); Minority (6): Democratic (6)

Website
- https://www.aging.senate.gov/

The United States Senate Special Committee on Aging is a special committee in the United States Senate established in 1961. Initially established as a temporary committee, it became a permanent Senate committee in 1977. As a special committee, it has no legislative authority, but it studies issues related to older Americans, particularly Medicare and Social Security.

Before the passage of Medicare, the committee was studying healthcare insurance coverage for elderly American citizens. The committee conducts oversight of the Medicare program, Social Security and the Older Americans Act. Some of the issues that have been examined by the committee include unacceptable conditions in nursing homes, protection from age discrimination, and pricing practices for prescription drugs.

== Members, 119th Congress ==
Majority	Minority
Rick Scott, Florida, Chair; Dave McCormick, Pennsylvania; Jim Justice, West Virginia (from January 14, 2025); Tommy Tuberville, Alabama; Ron Johnson, Wisconsin; Jon Husted, Ohio (from January 24, 2025); Ashley Moody, Florida (from January 24, 2025)	Kirsten Gillibrand, New York, Ranking Member; Elizabeth Warren, Massachusetts; Mark Kelly, Arizona; Raphael Warnock, Georgia; Andy Kim, New Jersey; Angela Alsobrooks, Maryland

== Historical rosters ==
=== 115th Congress ===
Majority	Minority
Susan Collins, Maine, Chair; Orrin Hatch, Utah; Jeff Flake, Arizona; Tim Scott, South Carolina; Thom Tillis, North Carolina; Bob Corker, Tennessee; Richard Burr, North Carolina; Marco Rubio, Florida; Deb Fischer, Nebraska	Bob Casey, Pennsylvania, Ranking Member; Bill Nelson, Florida; Kirsten Gillibrand, New York; Richard Blumenthal, Connecticut; Joe Donnelly, Indiana; Elizabeth Warren, Massachusetts; Catherine Cortez Masto, Nevada; Doug Jones, Alabama

=== 116th Congress ===
Majority	Minority
Susan Collins, Maine, Chair; Tim Scott, South Carolina; Richard Burr, North Carolina; Martha McSally, Arizona (until December 2, 2020); Marco Rubio, Florida; Josh Hawley, Missouri; Mike Braun, Indiana; Rick Scott, Florida	Bob Casey, Pennsylvania, Ranking Member; Kirsten Gillibrand, New York; Richard Blumenthal, Connecticut; Elizabeth Warren, Massachusetts; Doug Jones, Alabama; Kyrsten Sinema, Arizona; Jacky Rosen, Nevada

=== 117th Congress ===
Majority	Minority
Bob Casey, Pennsylvania, Chair; Kirsten Gillibrand, New York; Richard Blumenthal, Connecticut; Elizabeth Warren, Massachusetts; Jacky Rosen, Nevada; Mark Kelly, Arizona; Raphael Warnock, Georgia	Tim Scott, South Carolina, Ranking Member; Susan Collins, Maine; Richard Burr, North Carolina; Marco Rubio, Florida; Mike Braun, Indiana; Rick Scott, Florida; Mike Lee, Utah

=== 118th Congress ===
Majority	Minority
Bob Casey, Pennsylvania, Chair; Kirsten Gillibrand, New York; Richard Blumenthal, Connecticut; Elizabeth Warren, Massachusetts; Mark Kelly, Arizona; Raphael Warnock, Georgia; John Fetterman, Pennsylvania	Mike Braun, Indiana, Ranking Member; Tim Scott, South Carolina; Marco Rubio, Florida; Rick Scott, Florida; JD Vance, Ohio; Pete Ricketts, Nebraska

== Chairs ==
Name	Party	State	Start	End
Patrick McNamara	D	MI	1961	1963
George Smathers	D	FL	1963	1967
Pete Williams	D	NJ	1967	1971
Frank Church	D	ID	1971	1979
Lawton Chiles	D	FL	1979	1981
John Heinz	R	PA	1981	1987
John Melcher	D	MT	1987	1989
David Pryor	D	AR	1989	1995
Bill Cohen	R	ME	1995	1997
Chuck Grassley	R	IA	1997	2001
John Breaux	D	LA	2001	
Larry Craig	R	ID	2001	
John Breaux	D	LA	2001	2003
Larry Craig	R	ID	2003	2005
Gordon Smith	R	OR	2005	2007
Herb Kohl	D	WI	2007	2013
Bill Nelson	D	FL	2013	2015
Susan Collins	R	ME	2015	2021
Bob Casey	D	PA	2021	2025
Rick Scott	R	FL	2025	present

== Ranking members ==
A list of ranking members is below.

Name	Party	State	Start	End
Everett Dirksen	R	IL	1961	1969
Winston Prouty	R	VT	1969	1971
Hiram Fong	R	HI	1971	1977
Pete Domenici	R	NM	1977	1981
Lawton Chiles	D	FL	1981	1983
John Glenn	D	OH	1983	1987
John Heinz	R	PA	1987	1991
Bill Cohen	R	ME	1991	1995
David Pryor	D	AR	1995	1997
John Breaux	D	LA	1997	2001
Larry Craig	R	ID	2001	2003
John Breaux	D	LA	2003	2005
Herb Kohl	D	WI	2005	2007
Gordon Smith	R	OR	2007	2009
Mel Martínez	R	FL	2009	
Bob Corker	R	TN	2009	2013
Susan Collins	R	ME	2013	2015
Claire McCaskill	D	MO	2015	2017
Bob Casey	D	PA	2017	2021
Tim Scott	R	SC	2021	2023
Mike Braun	R	IN	2023	2025
Kirsten Gillibrand	D	NY	2025	present

== See also ==
- List of United States Senate committees
