= Mike Futrell =

American politician (born 1960)

Charles Michael "Mike" Futrell

Member of the Louisiana House of Representatives for the 66th district
- In office 2000–2005
- Preceded by: Woody Jenkins
- Succeeded by: Hunter Greene

Member of the East Baton Rouge Parish Metro Council, District 8
- In office 1997–2000
- Preceded by: Lynda Imes
- Succeeded by: Mike Walker

Personal details
- Born: July 20, 1960 (age 66) Baton Rouge, Louisiana, United States
- Party: Independent
- Education: Baton Rouge High School; Louisiana State University (B.B.A.); Paul M. Hebert Law Center (Juris Doctor); University of Massachusetts Amherst (MBA)
- Occupation: Former City manager

Military service
- Allegiance: United States
- Branch/service: United States Navy
- Years of service: 1982-1996, 2006, 2010-2011
- Rank: Captain (Reserves)
- Unit: USS Grant; USS Kentucky
- Battles/wars: Iraq War

Charles Michael Futrell, known as Mike Futrell (born July 20, 1960), is the city manager for Riverside, California. He is an attorney, a retired United States Navy officer, and a former member of the Louisiana House of Representatives.

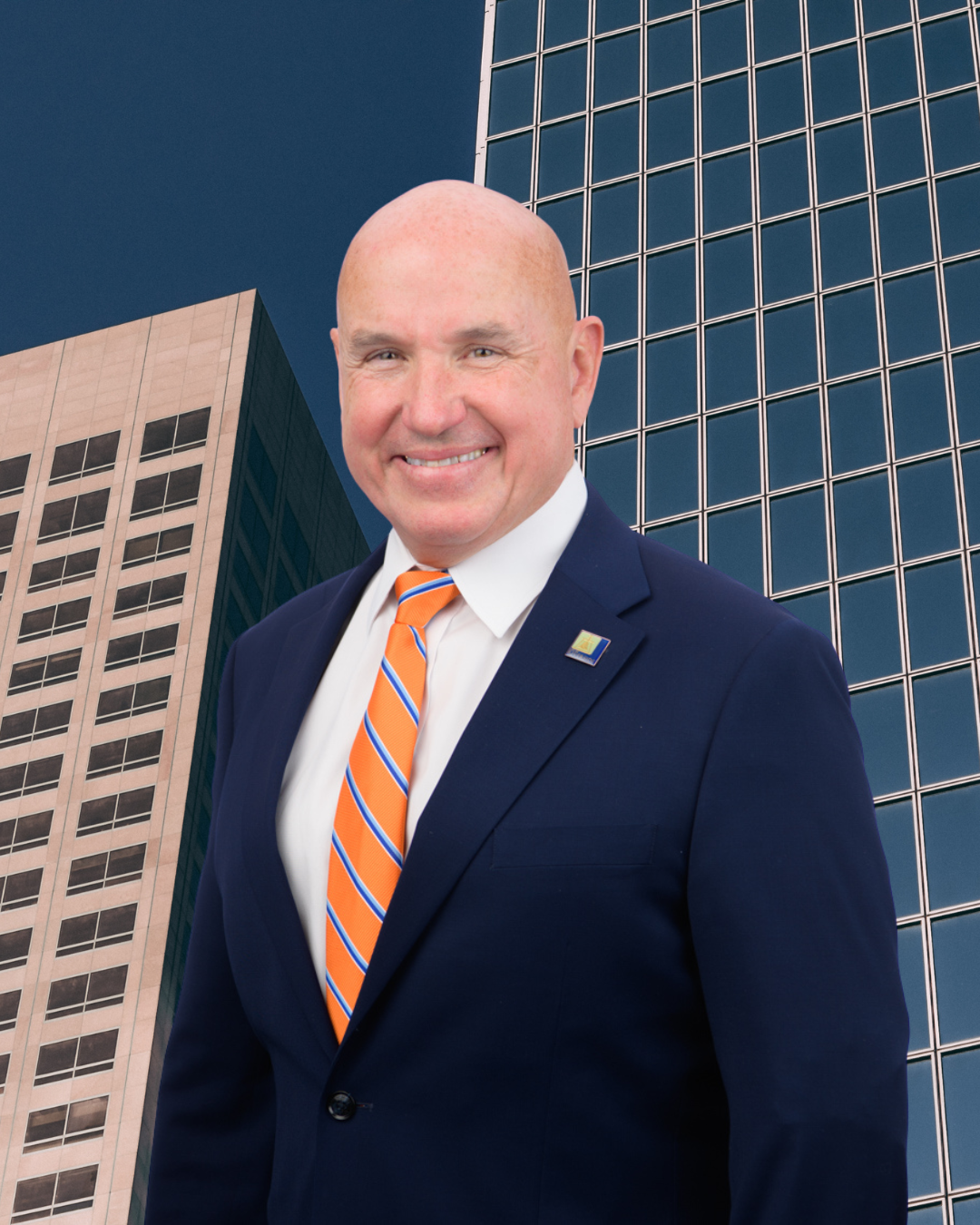
Mike Futrell, City of Riverside, CA

== Education ==
Born in Baton Rouge, Louisiana, Futrell graduated from Baton Rouge High School in 1978. In 1982, he received a Bachelor of Business and Public Administration from Louisiana State University. He then received a Juris Doctor degree from LSU Paul M. Hebert Law Center and a Master of Business Administration (MBA) from the University of Massachusetts Amherst. Futrell is a graduate of the Air Command and Staff College at Maxwell Air Force Base, in Montgomery, Alabama.

== Navy career ==
From 1987 to 1993, Futrell served two tours of duty as an officer on nuclear submarines. On the submarine USS Ulysses S. Grant (SSBN-631), near the end of the Cold War, Futrell came in constant contact with submarines of the former Soviet Union. Futrell also served on the commissioning crew of the submarine USS Kentucky (SSBN 737) operating out of Naval Submarine Base Kings Bay in Georgia. In 2006, Futrell was recalled to active duty for twelve months during the Iraq War. For that service, Futrell was awarded the Bronze Star. Futrell was assigned as the officer in charge of DRMS operations in Iraq, leading installations at four U.S. bases in Iraq. In 2010, Futrell was again recalled to active military duty, this time on staff at U.S. Pacific Command in Hawaii, as a Navy Captain (United States O-6), where he was the director of the Commander's Action Group (CAG), under the commander of U.S. Pacific Command, Admiral Robert F. Willard. He also led a crisis action team responding to the earthquake/tsunami/nuclear disaster in Japan code named Operation Tomodachi. At the end of his one-year tour of duty, Futrell stayed in Hawaii as executive vice president of Hawaii Gas, the natural gas utility servicing the major Hawaiian Islands.

== Public service ==
In 1996, Futrell was elected to the City of Baton Rouge/Parish of East Baton Rouge Metropolitan Council, succeeding the incumbent Republican. In 1999, Futrell was elected to the Louisiana House of Representatives where he served on the Transportation Committee, House and Governmental Affairs Committee and the Local and Municipal Affairs Committee. Futrell was re-elected to the Louisiana House of Representatives in 2003.

In 2005, Futrell left the House of Representatives to join the staff of newly elected United States Senator David Vitter as State Director, responsible for all operations throughout Louisiana and principal state liaison to the Senator's Washington D.C. Office. In 2008, Futrell left Vitter's office to work for the City of Baton Rouge under then Mayor-President Kip Holden as the assistant chief administrative officer. Walter Monsour, under whom Futrell served, said that Futrell earned his trust through the handling of the $1.2 billion municipal sewer program. In 2009, upon Monsour's retirement, Futrell was elevated to chief administrative officer by Holden.

In 2014, Futrell became the City Manager for South San Francisco. He reorganized the city staff, hiring a number of new managers. He was recognized as a standout champion for life sciences during his tenure; under his leadership, South San Francisco developed into the "Biotechnology Capital of the World," home to over 250 life science companies. He improved South San Francisco's finances earning the city its first ever AAA bond rating and during his tenure the city yielded budget surpluses every year and created record budget reserves. He led formation and administration of cultural diversity efforts including the nationally recognized programs "Commission on Racial and Social Equity" and "Diversity: It's In the City's DNA".

In November 2022, Futrell was confirmed as the next City Manager of Riverside, California, and assumed the position in January 2023. Futrell's 2026 City Manager's Annual Report to the Riverside Community lists accomplishments as balanced budgets, job growth, economic development wins, upgraded streets and parks, lower crime, progress reducing homelessness and building large projects including a new library and renovation/expansion of the City's historic museum.

In April 2026, Futrell announced his plans to leave the City of Riverside for the City of Pasadena, expecting to start May 13. With Futrell as the City Manager for Riverside, it has led to 100% police staffing and a 35% reduction in crime since starting in 2022, as well as over $4 billion in new investments in the city and several new companies opening. However, the next week, Futrell announced his plans to stay as City Manager of Riverside, citing his effort to continue working on the Measure Z renewal along with the $4 billion in new investments for the City of Riverside.

In June 2026, Futrell announced his resignation from the City of Riverside, citing the opportunity for a leadership transition.

Louisiana House of Representatives
Preceded by Woody Jenkins	Louisiana State Representative for District 66 (East Baton Rouge Parish); 2000–2005	Succeeded by Hunter Greene
