= Mary Landrieu =

American politician (born 1955)

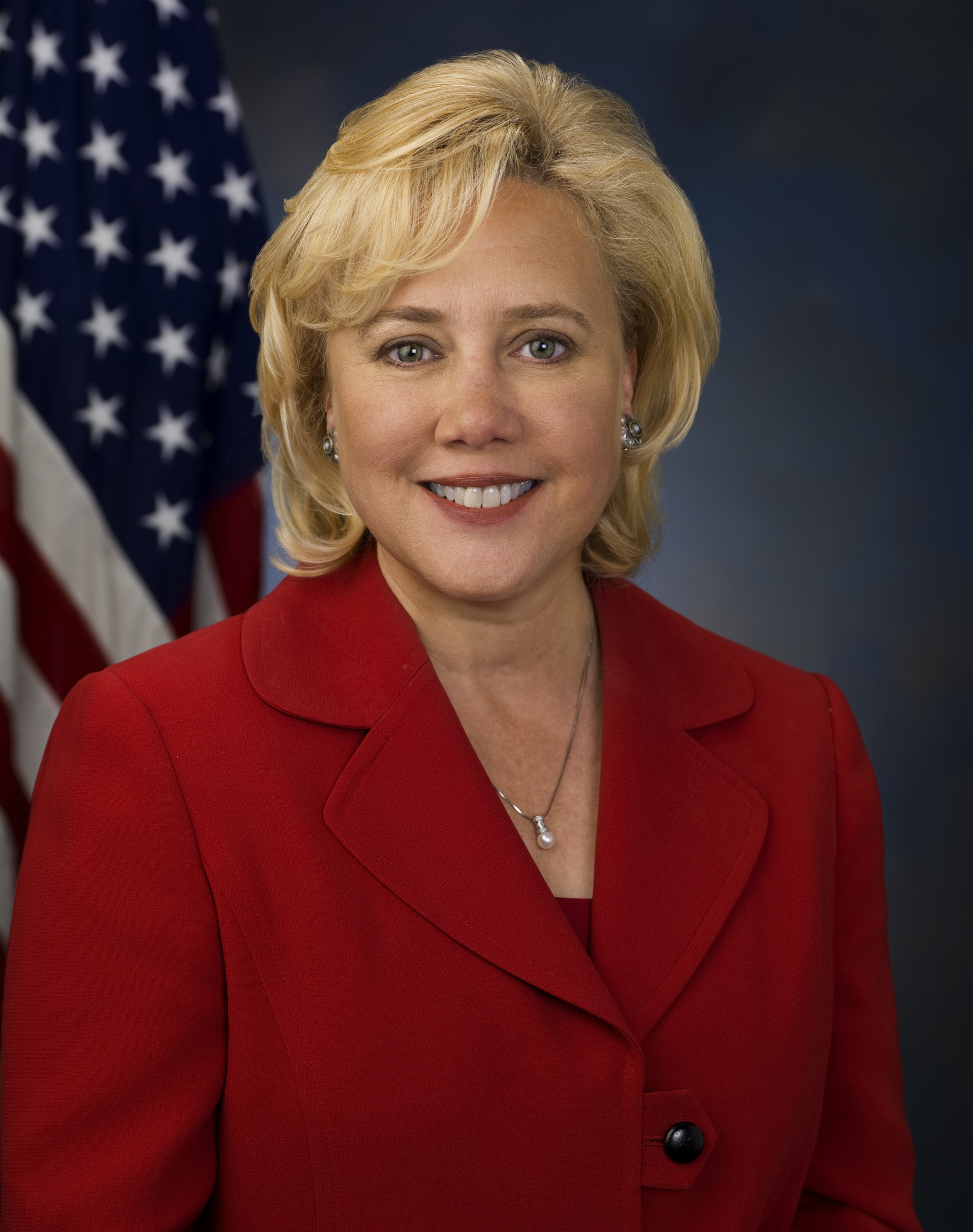
- Official portrait, 2009

United States Senator from Louisiana
- In office January 3, 1997 – January 3, 2015
- Preceded by: J. Bennett Johnston
- Succeeded by: Bill Cassidy
Senate positions
Chair of the Senate Energy Committee
In office February 12, 2014 – January 3, 2015
Preceded by	Ron Wyden
Succeeded by	Lisa Murkowski
Chair of the Senate Small Business Committee
In office January 3, 2009 – February 12, 2014
Preceded by	John Kerry
Succeeded by	Maria Cantwell

Treasurer of Louisiana
- In office January 1, 1988 – January 8, 1996
- Governor: Edwin Edwards; Buddy Roemer
- Preceded by: Mary Evelyn Parker
- Succeeded by: Ken Duncan

Member of the Louisiana House of Representatives from the 90th district
- In office January 1980 – January 1, 1988
- Preceded by: Clyde F. Bel Jr.
- Succeeded by: Mitch Landrieu

Personal details
- Born: Mary Loretta Landrieu; November 23, 1955 (age 70) Arlington County, Virginia, U.S.
- Party: Democratic
- Spouse: Frank Snellings (m. 1988)
- Children: 2
- Parent: Moon Landrieu (father)
- Relatives: Mitch Landrieu (brother)
- Education: Louisiana State University (BA)
- Landrieu's voice Landrieu chairing a hearing on the Small Business Jobs Act of 2010. Recorded October 18, 2011

Mary Loretta Landrieu (/ˈlændruː/ LAN-drew; born November 23, 1955) is an American entrepreneur and politician who served as a United States senator from Louisiana from 1997 to 2015. A member of the Democratic Party, Landrieu served as the Louisiana State Treasurer from 1988 to 1996, and in the Louisiana House of Representatives from 1980 to 1988.

Landrieu came to national attention in the wake of Hurricane Katrina in 2005 after she publicly criticized the federal response to the natural disaster. Her opposition to the public option played a major role in the crafting of the 2010 Affordable Care Act, since she did not agree to support it until additional concessions were granted to support Louisiana's Medicaid system. In 2011, she became a cardinal (chair) of the Senate's Homeland Security Appropriations Subcommittee. She chaired the Senate Committee on Small Business and Entrepreneurship from 2009 to 2014, and chaired the Senate Committee on Energy and Natural Resources from 2014 to 2015.

Landrieu was defeated in her 2014 re-election campaign by Republican Bill Cassidy, with Cassidy triumphing in a runoff. As of 2026, Landrieu is the most recent Democrat to serve in the U.S. Senate from Louisiana.

== Early life and education ==
Landrieu was born in Arlington County, Virginia, on November 23, 1955, and raised in New Orleans, Louisiana. She is the daughter of Moon Landrieu, former mayor of New Orleans and U.S. secretary of the Department of Housing and Urban Development, and the sister of Mitch Landrieu, who was a former mayor of New Orleans and Lieutenant Governor of Louisiana. She was raised as Catholic.

She attended Ursuline Academy in New Orleans. While a student at Ursuline, Landrieu participated in the Close Up Washington civic education program.

In 1977, she graduated from Louisiana State University in Baton Rouge, Louisiana with a Bachelor of Arts degree in sociology, where she was a member of Delta Gamma sorority.

== Career ==
After graduating from Louisiana State University, Landrieu worked as a real estate agent.

=== State legislature ===
Landrieu was first elected to the Louisiana House of Representatives in 1979, serving from 1980 to 1988 and representing a New Orleans district. She was re-elected to the 90th district in October 1983 with 78% of the vote. In October 1987, she was succeeded in the 90th district by her brother Mitch.

On July 25, 1995, The Times-Picayune reported that, as a state representative, Landrieu awarded Tulane University tuition waivers to a former campaign manager.

=== State treasurer ===
On January 1, 1987, State Treasurer Mary Evelyn Parker, the longtime Democratic incumbent, resigned with nearly a year and a half left in her fifth term. Landrieu ran to succeed her in both the special and regularly scheduled elections, both held in October 1987. No Republican filed to run, so Landrieu faced only Democratic opponents. She came first on both ballots with 44%. She defeated two legislative colleagues, State Rep. Kevin Reilly Sr., chief executive officer of Lamar Advertising Company in Baton Rouge, who came second in the special and regular elections, with 33% and 32%, respectively, and State Rep. Buddy Leach, a former U.S. Representative, who came third in both elections with 15%. Tom Burbank, son of Thomas D. Burbank Sr., former head of the state police, came in last in both elections with 9% of the vote. Reilly decided not to contest a runoff election, known in Louisiana as a "general election", and Landrieu won the treasurer's position by default. In 1991, Landrieu was unopposed for re-election.

=== 1995 gubernatorial election ===
Landrieu declined to run for a third term as Treasurer, giving up the office to run for governor in the 1995 election. The other major candidates in the race were Democratic U.S. Representative Cleo Fields; State Senator Murphy J. Foster, Jr., who switched his party affiliation from Democratic to Republican when he filed; Democratic attorney Phil Preis; Republican former Governor Buddy Roemer; and Democratic Lieutenant Governor Melinda Schwegmann. Landrieu finished third in the state's nonpartisan blanket primary with 18% of the vote, finishing 8,983 votes behind Fields, who came second with 19% of the vote. Roemer came fourth with 18%, Preis was fifth with 9% and Schwegmann came sixth with 5%. Foster came first with 26% and went on to defeat Fields in the runoff with 64% of the vote. Landrieu was succeeded as state treasurer by her fellow Democrat Ken Duncan, a Baton Rouge attorney and businessman.

== U.S. Senate ==
=== Elections ===
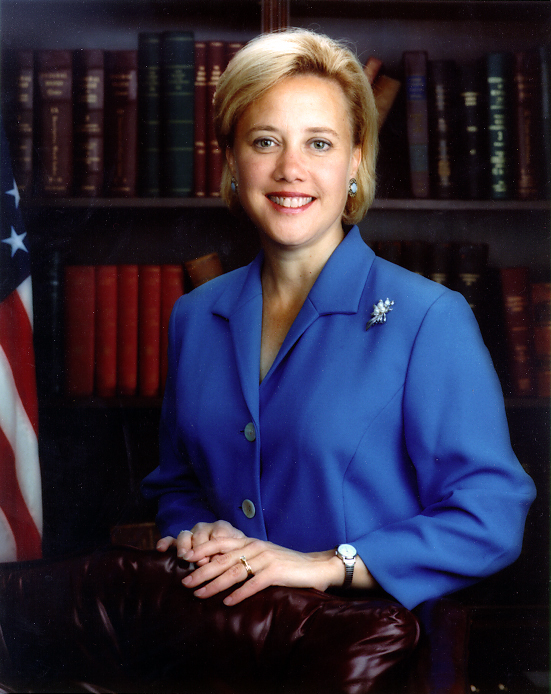
Landrieu during the 108th Congress as United States Senator from Louisiana

Landrieu was elected in 1996 to the U.S. Senate seat previously held by John Bennett Johnston, Jr. of Shreveport after winning a close and controversial runoff election. (The runoff election is what other states would call "the general election" of a federal seat.) She defeated state Representative Woody Jenkins of Baton Rouge. Landrieu narrowly won re-election in 2002. She defeated state Election Commissioner Suzanne Haik Terrell of New Orleans. Some experts and pundits had considered Landrieu as a possible running mate for presidential candidate John Kerry in the 2004 election before he selected then-Senator John Edwards of North Carolina. In 2004 Landrieu became Louisiana's senior senator upon the retirement of John Breaux, who was succeeded by Republican David Vitter.

In 2008, she won a relatively comfortable 52% to 46% re-election to a third term in a race against her challenger, state Treasurer John Neely Kennedy. He was a former Democrat who switched to the Republican Party in 2007.

Landrieu sought re-election in 2014. Former President Bill Clinton campaigned on her behalf in Louisiana. While Landrieu garnered 42% of the vote she fell short of the 50.1% required for re-election. She was defeated in the December 6, 2014, runoff election by her Republican opponent, Congressman Bill Cassidy, by a 56% to 44% margin.

=== Tenure ===
In 2002, she voted for the Iraq Resolution, and in 2003 she issued a statement indicating that, "The time for diplomacy has ended." She voted for the Class Action Fairness Act of 2005 and the Protection of Lawful Commerce in Arms Act.

In 2005, Landrieu sponsored a resolution, which the Senate passed in an unprecedented action, to formally apologize for its repeated failure in the early twentieth century to pass anti-lynching legislation. The Senate Southern white Democrats had filibustered the Dyer bill in 1922 and two other bills that passed the House. She held high-profile hearings on the mistakes of the Federal Emergency Management Agency (FEMA) in the wake of hurricanes Katrina and Rita in 2005.

Subsequent to the 2006 mid-term elections, in which the Democratic Party gained control of both houses of Congress, Landrieu announced (along with Republican Olympia Snowe of Maine) the formation of the "Common Ground Coalition", a group of moderate senators of both parties, with the goal of finding bipartisan consensus on legislative matters.

Landrieu voted to raise the estate tax exemption to $5 million in 2008, but voted against repeal of the estate tax in 2006.

On December 15, 2008, it was announced that Landrieu would become chairwoman of the Senate Small Business and Entrepreneurship Committee for the 111th Congress when former Chairman John Kerry left to lead the Senate Foreign Relations Committee, previously headed by Vice President-elect Joe Biden.

In September 2010, Landrieu announced she would hold up OMB director Jacob Lew’s confirmation until the administration lifted or eased a federal freeze on deepwater oil-and-gas drilling. Her delay of Lew's nomination came despite broad bipartisan support for appointing him to OMB. The Senate Budget Committee recommended that Lew be confirmed on a 22–1 vote.

According to The Washington Post, Landrieu "is one of the lawmakers leading for more natural gas exports".

On December 18, 2010, Landrieu voted in favor of the Don't Ask, Don't Tell Repeal Act of 2010. In 2011, she became chairman of the Senate's Homeland Security Appropriations Subcommittee, giving her significant influence in the funding of federal agencies like the U.S. Coast Guard, Department of Homeland Security and FEMA. On April 17, 2013, Landrieu voted to expand background checks for gun purchases.

In April 2014, the United States Senate debated the Minimum Wage Fairness Act (S. 1737; 113th Congress). The bill would amend the Fair Labor Standards Act of 1938 (FLSA) to increase the federal minimum wage for employees to $10.10 per hour over the course of a two-year period. The bill was strongly supported by President Barack Obama and many of the Democratic senators, but strongly opposed by Republicans in the Senate and House. She wanted additional debate on the timeline and the raise for tipped workers. Landrieu said that "I do not believe that $10.10 an hour is too high to aspire to, but how quickly we get there and what increments, the tipped wage, how that should be handled, who should get paid the tipped wage, and who shouldn't. There are a lot of questions about that, and some of those discussions are going on."

==== Health care ====
Landrieu opposed the public health insurance option in the America's Affordable Health Choices Act of 2009 (HR 3200) until the bill was rewritten to send a $300,000,000 payment to Medicaid for her home state. When two pages were added to the bill to place $300 million in Louisiana's Medicaid system, she changed her web page in order to reflect her support of the program. Conservative figures referred to the deal as the "Louisiana Purchase". A typographical error in the bill resulted in $4.3 billion in additional funds for Medicaid for Louisiana. As a result, prominent conservative figures Glenn Beck and Rush Limbaugh called her a "high-priced prostitute". Days later, Sen. Landrieu took to the Senate floor to defend her vote by detailing the timeline of her Medicaid funding request. Landrieu noted her $300 million request was made before President Barack Obama was sworn into office.

On November 21, 2009, Landrieu voted with fifty-nine other senators to bring the health care bill up for debate. On December 8, 2009, she voted against the Nelson–Hatch–Casey amendment which proposed to ban federal funding for private plans that covered elective abortions but would have allowed individuals to purchase separate individual riders that would cover abortions. Prior to a concession of $300 million being added to the bill, Landrieu responded to a question on popular support of the public option, and asserted that the option has popular support because "when people hear 'public option' they hear 'free health care'. Everybody wants free health care. Everybody wants health care they don't have to pay for."

Landrieu voted for the Patient Protection and Affordable Care Act (known as "Obamacare") in December 2009. In September 2013, Landrieu voted to restore funding for the ACA that House Republicans had eliminated in their version of the funding bill.

On March 1, 2012, Landrieu voted against a measure that would have repealed a birth control mandate in the health care bill. In October 2013, she introduced a bill to force health insurance companies to re-issue plans which they have cancelled.

==== Hurricane Katrina ====
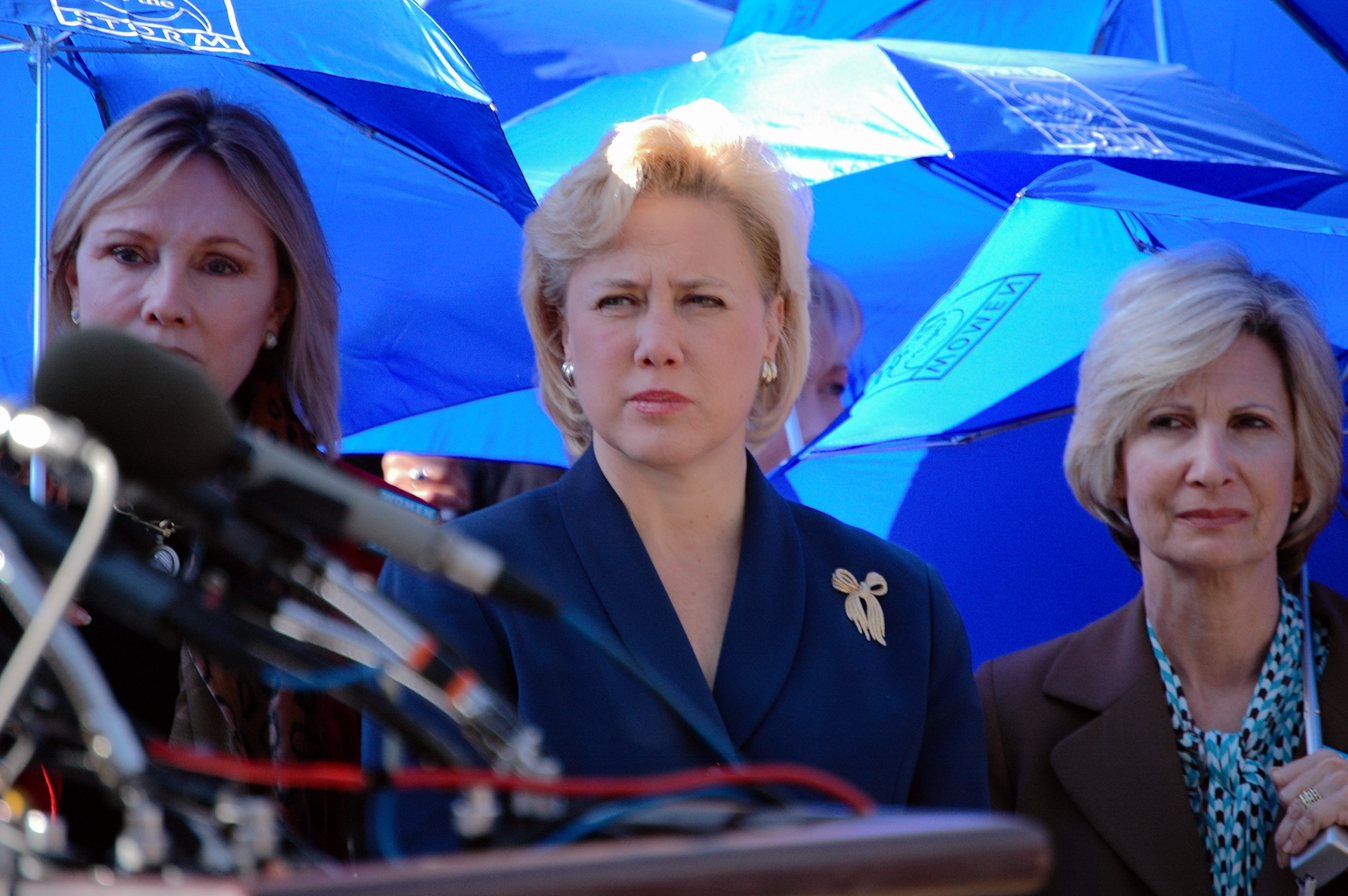
U.S. Senator Landrieu (center) joins Women of the Storm from the Gulf Coast

In the weeks following Hurricane Katrina, Landrieu and fellow Senator David Vitter co-sponsored the Hurricane Katrina Disaster Relief and Economic Recovery Act of 2005 (S.1765), a 440-page aid package worth an estimated $250 billion The bill was read twice by Congress, then referred to the Senate Finance Committee.

Separate legislation was passed to provide $1 billion in loans to communities affected by Katrina despite Landrieu's objection to the provision insisted on by Republicans that prohibited the loans from being forgiven. In 2007, when Democrats took control of the House and Senate, they passed legislation written by Landrieu that authorized FEMA to forgive the loans. However, 40% of the loans were not forgiven by FEMA, which led Landrieu to insert addition provisions into the 2013 federal spending bill to forgive the remainder of these loans.

Landrieu's national name recognition rose in the aftermath of Hurricane Katrina as she made multiple TV appearances to discuss the response effort. Landrieu was noted in The New York Times as becoming "a national spokeswoman for victims of the hurricane" as she complained of "the staggering incompetence of the national government." She was particularly critical of President George W. Bush, who, in turn, was critical of her in his 2010 memoir Decision Points, in which he related telling her to be quiet after she interrupted him in a meeting with what he called an "unproductive emotional outburst".

==== Judicial nominations ====
Landrieu voted for the confirmation of Chief Justice John Roberts in 2005, but in 2006, she opposed Samuel Alito; she voted in favor of cloture to send the nomination to an up-or-down vote. She voted for both Sonia Sotomayor in 2009 and Elena Kagan in 2010.

==== USA Patriot Act ====
On August 3, 2007, Landrieu broke ranks with Democrats when she and Louisiana Rep. Charlie Melancon sided with Republicans and the Bush administration in voting for the Protect America Act, an amendment to the USA Patriot Act further expanding wiretap powers.

In 2011, she was the inadvertent Senate sponsor of the four-year extension to the Patriot Act when Senator Reid amended a small business bill introduced by Landrieu as a means of avoiding a threatened filibuster by Senator Rand Paul. Landrieu joined the majority in voting for the extension, which passed 72–23.

==== Conservative activists convicted in failed sting attempt ====
On January 25, 2010, four Republican conservative activists, including Stan Dai, Joseph Basel, both 24; Robert Flanagan, son of Bill Flanagan, acting U.S. Attorney in Louisiana; and conservative filmmaker James O'Keefe, were arrested by US Marshals and subsequently charged with entering a federal facility under false pretenses for entering Landrieu's New Orleans office under the guise of being telephone repairmen. The crew intended to record their interactions with Landrieu's staff. Two of the activists posed as telephone repair technicians in order to gain access to the telephone system. O'Keefe admitted to secretly "recording" the interactions with the staff with his cell phone and aiding in the "planning, coordination, and preparation of the operation."

On March 27, 2010, the U.S. Attorney reduced the charges to entering federal property under false pretenses, a misdemeanor charge. On May 26, 2010, all four pleaded guilty before Magistrate Daniel Knowles III in a New Orleans federal court. Three of the four received two years' probation, 75 hours of community service and $1,500 fines; while James O'Keefe received a sentence of three years' probation, 100 hours of community service and a $1,500 fine.

==== "Air Mary" controversy ====
There was a controversy over Landrieu's payment of airline flights with Senate money, some of which may have violated campaign finance law. Landrieu's opponents called attention to the controversy, launching a campaign called "Air Mary". Activists dressed as pilots, flight attendants, and ground crew workers greeted her at her campaign appearances.

In August 2014, after it was reported that Landrieu violated federal law by using taxpayer dollars to charter at least four private flights to campaign events, Landrieu announced that she had ordered an internal investigation into all of her flights during her time in the Senate. In September 2014, Landrieu revealed that the internal investigation into her flights had concluded that, since she had entered the Senate, she had improperly charged her Senate office $33,700 for private flights to campaign events. Landrieu originally said the charter company mistakenly billed Landrieu's Senate office instead of her re-election campaign.

==== No Budget, No Pay Act ====
On January 31, 2013 Landrieu voted for the No Budget, No Pay Act. The bill's purpose was to temporarily suspend the debt ceiling and require that no member of Congress be paid until a budget was passed. The bill passed the Senate in a 64 - 34 vote.

=== Committee assignments ===
- Committee on Appropriations
  - Subcommittee on Energy and Water Development
  - Subcommittee on Financial Services and General Government
  - Subcommittee on Homeland Security (Chair)
  - Subcommittee on Labor, Health and Human Services, Education, and Related Agencies
  - Subcommittee on Military Construction and Veterans' Affairs, and Related Agencies
  - Subcommittee on State, Foreign Operations, and Related Programs
- Committee on Energy and Natural Resources (Chair)
  - Subcommittee on Energy
  - Subcommittee on National Parks
  - Subcommittee on Public Lands and Forests
- Committee on Homeland Security and Governmental Affairs
  - Subcommittee on Oversight of Government Management, the Federal Workforce, and the District of Columbia
  - Ad Hoc Subcommittee on State, Local, and Private Sector Preparedness and Integration
  - Ad Hoc Subcommittee on Disaster Recovery (Chair)
- Committee on Small Business and Entrepreneurship

=== Caucus memberships ===
- Senate Oceans Caucus
- Senate Natural Gas Caucus, co-chair
- Congressional Coalition on Adoption, co-chair
- Senate Caucus on Foster Youth, co-chair

== Political positions ==
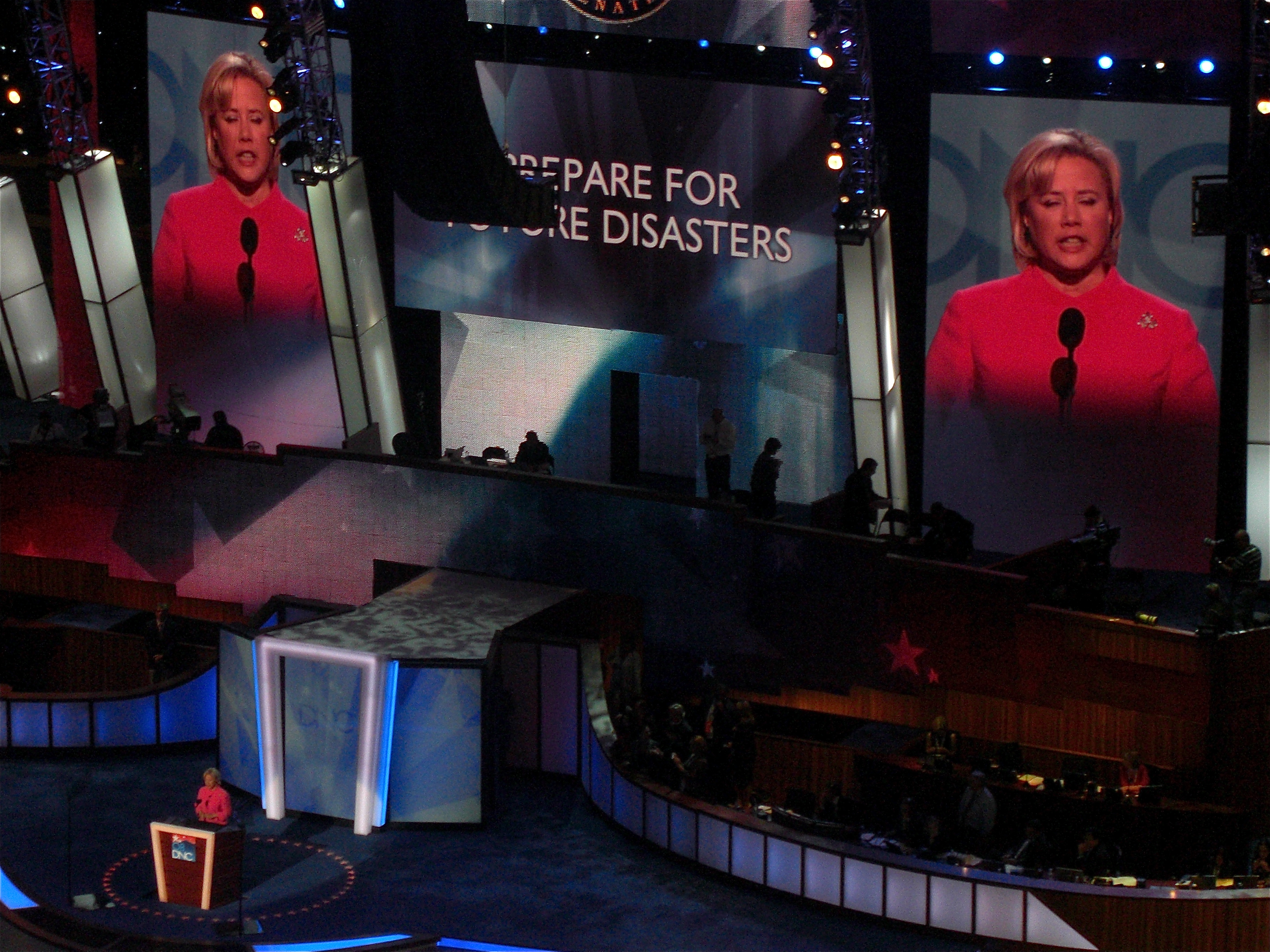
Landrieu speaks during the second day of the 2008 Democratic National Convention in Denver

Landrieu was one of the more conservative Democrats in the U.S. Senate. The American Conservative Union rated Landrieu as 40% conservative in 2007, which was the highest score of any sitting Democrat and higher than the scores of two Republicans. In 2012, her lifetime rating is 21%, which is the-fourth highest rating among Democrats in the Senate. For 2012 votes, National Journal ranked Landrieu as the 47th-most conservative member of the Senate, while the Times-Picayune found that she voted in support of President Obama's positions 97% of the time.

=== Abortion ===
Landrieu supports abortion rights. She has a 100% rating from the pro-choice group NARAL and a 0% rating from the pro-life group Louisiana Right to Life Federation.

=== Energy ===
Landrieu voted to confirm Gina McCarthy as administrator of the Environmental Protection Agency. Landrieu supports the Keystone Pipeline and called for President Barack Obama to approve its construction.

=== Guns ===
Landrieu had a "C" grade from the National Rifle Association Political Victory Fund (NRA-PVF) in 2013, and a "D" grade in 2014. The NRA-PVF endorsed her opponent, Bill Cassidy, in the 2014 Louisiana Senate race, running a specific attack campaign against Landrieu.

=== Internet sales tax ===
Landrieu voted for an Internet sales tax.

=== Affordable Care Act ===
Landrieu voted for the Affordable Care Act (also known as Obamacare). Critics claimed she withheld her vote until she had secured what is now referred to as the "Louisiana Purchase" originally for up to $300,000,000 in additional Medicaid funds to Louisiana, which, due to a typographical error in the healthcare bill, became an additional $4.3 billion for Louisiana's Medicaid program. Days later, Senator Landrieu took to the Senate floor to defend her vote by detailing the timeline of her Medicaid funding request. Landrieu noted her $300 million request was made before President Obama was sworn into office. When asked by reporters in 2013, Senator Landrieu said that she would vote for it again if she were given a chance.

=== Same-sex marriage ===
Landrieu personally supports same-sex marriage, but defended the state's constitutional ban on the grounds that a majority of Louisianans voted for it.

== Personal life ==
Landrieu and her husband, attorney Frank Snellings, have two children, Connor and Mary Shannon, and one grandson, Maddox. In December 2014 Frank was the subject of an article in The Irish Times, having rediscovered his Irish family 44 years after he was adopted in Ireland by the Snellings family from Louisiana.

== Honors and recognition ==
Landrieu was recognized by the Order Sons of Italy in America as the first woman of Italian-American heritage to become a US senator.

== Electoral history ==
=== 1995 gubernatorial election ===
Jungle primary results by parish in 1995

Louisiana gubernatorial election jungle primary, 1995
Party	Candidate	Votes	%
Republican	Mike Foster	385,267	26.10
Democratic	Cleo Fields	280,921	19.03
Democratic	Mary Landrieu	271,938	18.43
Republican	Buddy Roemer	263,330	17.84
Democratic	Phil Preis	133,271	9.03
Democratic	Melinda Schwegmann	71,288	4.83
Democratic	Robert Adley	27,534	1.87
Independent	Arthur D. "Jim" Nichols	16,616	1.13
Democratic	Gene H. Alexander	5,688	0.39
Independent	Kenneth Woods	4,964	0.34
Independent	Darryl Paul Ward	4,210	0.29
Democratic	Belinda Alexandrenko	3,161	0.21
Independent	Lonnie Creech	2,338	0.16
Independent	Ronnie Glynn Johnson	1,884	0.13
Independent	Anne Thompson	1,416	0.1
Total votes		1,473,826	100

=== 1996 Senate election ===
Runoff results by parish in 1996

Louisiana United States Senate jungle primary election, September 21, 1996
Party	Candidate	Votes	%	±%
Republican	Woody Jenkins	322,244	26.23	
Democratic	Mary Landrieu	264,268	21.51	
Democratic	Richard Ieyoub	250,682	20.41	
Republican	David Duke	141,489	11.52	
Republican	Jimmy Hayes	71,699	5.84	
Republican	Bill Linder	58,243	4.74	
Republican	Chuck McMains	45,164	3.68	
Republican	Peggy Wilson	31,877	2.6	
Democratic	Troyce Guice	15,277	1.24	
Independent	Nicholas J. Accardo	10,035	0.82	
Independent	Arthur D. "Jim" Nichols	7,894	0.64	
Democratic	Sadie Roberts-Joseph	4,660	0.38	
Independent	Tom Kirk	1,987	0.16	
Independent	Darryl Paul Ward	1,770	0.14	
Independent	Sam Houston Melton, Jr.	1,270	0.1	
Turnout		1,228,559		

Louisiana United States Senate election runoff, November 5, 1996
Party	Candidate	Votes	%	±%
Democratic	Mary Landrieu	852,945	50.17	−3.78
Republican	Woody Jenkins	847,157	49.83	+6.35
Majority		5788	0.34	−10.13
Turnout		1,700,102		
Democratic hold				

=== 2002 Senate election ===
Runoff results by parish in 2002

Louisiana United States Senate jungle primary election, November 5, 2002
Party	Candidate	Votes	%	±%
Democratic	Mary Landrieu (Incumbent)	573,347	46.00	
Republican	Suzanne Haik Terrell	339,506	27.24	
Republican	John Cooksey	171,752	13.78	
Republican	Tony Perkins	119,776	9.61	
Democratic	Raymond Brown	23,553	1.89	
Independent	Patrick E. "Live Wire" Landry	10,442	0.84	
Independent	James Lemann	3,866	0.31	
Libertarian	Gary D. Robbins	2,423	0.19	
Republican	Ernest Edward Skillman, Jr.	1,668	0.13	
Turnout		1,246,333		

General election results by parish in 2008

Louisiana United States Senate election runoff, December 7, 2002
Party	Candidate	Votes	%	±%
Democratic	Mary Landrieu (Incumbent)	638,654	51.70	+1.53
Republican	Suzanne Haik Terrell	596,642	48.30	−1.53
Majority		42,012	3.4	+3.06
Turnout		1,235,296		
Democratic hold				

=== 2008 Senate election ===
Louisiana United States Senate general election, November 5, 2008
Party	Candidate	Votes	%	±%
Democratic	Mary Landrieu (Incumbent)	988,298	52.11	+0.41
Republican	John Neely Kennedy	867,177	45.72	−2.58
Libertarian	Richard Fontanesi	18,590	0.98	n/a
Independent	Jay Patel	13,729	0.72	n/a
Independent	Robert Stewart	8,780	0.46	n/a
Majority		121,121	6.39	+2.99
Turnout		1,896,574		
Democratic hold				

=== 2014 Senate election ===
Bill Cassidy ran for the Senate in 2014 against three term incumbent Mary Landrieu. Cassidy was endorsed by Republican Senator David Vitter. Cassidy defeated Landrieu in the run-off election held on December 6, 2014, winning 56% of the vote while Landrieu received 44% of the vote. Cassidy thus became the first Republican to occupy the seat since William P. Kellogg left it in 1883.

Jungle primary results by parish in 2014

:

United States Senate election jungle primary in Louisiana, 2014
Party	Candidate	Votes	%
Democratic	Mary Landrieu (Incumbent)	619,402	42.08
Republican	Bill Cassidy	603,048	40.97
Republican	Rob Maness	202,556	13.76
Republican	Thomas Clements	14,173	0.96
Libertarian	Brannon McMorris	13,034	0.89
Democratic	Wayne Ables	11,323	0.77
Democratic	William Waymire	4,673	0.32
Democratic	Vallian Senegal	3,835	0.26
Total votes		1,473,826	100

Runoff results by parish in 2014

:

United States Senate election runoff in Louisiana, 2014
Party	Candidate	Votes	%
Republican	Bill Cassidy	712,379	55.93%
Democratic	Mary Landrieu (Incumbent)	561,210	44.07%
Total votes		1,273,589	100.00%
Republican gain from Democratic			

== Post-Senate career ==
Landrieu is a Senior Policy Advisor for Van Ness Feldman, a DC Law Firm. She became a strategic adviser to the Walton Family Foundation in April 2015. Landrieu is also a member of the pro-Israel group American Israel Public Affairs Committee.

In December 2018, Landrieu and a bipartisan group of former U.S. senators co-authored an opinion piece in The Washington Post urging the Senate to protect the Special Counsel Investigation led by special counsel Robert Mueller.

== See also ==
- Women in the United States Senate
- Conservative Democrat

Party political offices
Preceded by Mary Evelyn Parker	Democratic nominee for Treasurer of Louisiana; 1987, 1991	Vacant Title next held by John Kennedy; 2003
Preceded by Bennett Johnston	Democratic nominee for U.S. Senator from Louisiana (Class 2); 1996, 2002, 2008, 2014	Succeeded by Adrian Perkins
Preceded by Bob Graham	Chair of the Senate New Democrat Coalition; 2003–2011; Served alongside: Tom Carper	Position abolished
Political offices
Preceded by Mary Evelyn Parker	Treasurer of Louisiana; 1988–1996	Succeeded by Ken Duncan
U.S. Senate
Preceded by Bennett Johnston	U.S. Senator (Class 2) from Louisiana; 1997–2015; Served alongside: John Breaux, David Vitter	Succeeded by Bill Cassidy
Preceded by John Kerry	Chair of the Senate Small Business Committee; 2009–2014	Succeeded by Maria Cantwell
Preceded by Ron Wyden	Chair of the Senate Energy Committee; 2014–2015	Succeeded by Lisa Murkowski
U.S. order of precedence (ceremonial)
Preceded by John Breaux as Former U.S. Senator	Order of precedence of the United States as Former U.S. Senator	Succeeded by Olympia Snowe as Former U.S. Senator
