= Jimmy Hayes =

American politician

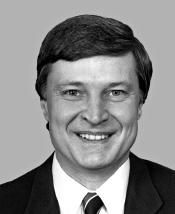

Member of the U.S. House of Representatives from Louisiana's 7th district
- In office January 3, 1987 – January 3, 1997
- Preceded by: John Breaux
- Succeeded by: Chris John

Personal details
- Born: James Allison Hayes; December 21, 1946 (age 79) Lafayette, Louisiana, U.S.
- Party: Democratic (before 1995); Republican (1995–present)
- Spouse: Leslie Hayes
- Education: University of Louisiana, Lafayette (BA); Tulane University (JD)

Military service
- Allegiance: United States
- Branch/service: United States Air Force
- Years of service: 1968-1974
- Unit: Louisiana Air National Guard
- Battles/wars: Vietnam War

James Allison Hayes (born December 21, 1946) is an American politician and lawyer. He is a Republican from Louisiana.

== Background ==
Born in Lafayette, Hayes graduated from the University of Louisiana at Lafayette (then the University of Southwestern Louisiana). He served in the Louisiana Air National Guard from 1968 to 1974.

== Career ==
Hayes served as Commissioner of Louisiana Financial Institutions under governors Dave Treen and Edwin Edwards from 1984 to 1985, preceded by Hunter Wagner and succeeded by Fred Dent.

In 1986, Hayes was elected to the United States House of Representatives as a Democrat to fill the seat vacated by John Berlinger Breaux. In 1990, Hayes again defeated David Thibodaux. The tally was 103,308 (58 percent) for Hayes, 68,430 (38 percent) for Thibodaux, and 7,364 (4 percent) for another Democrat, Johnny Myers. In 1992, Hayes as a Democrat defeated his own brother, Fredric Hayes, a Republican, with whom he had quarreled. Hayes received 84,149 (73 percent) to his brother's 23,870 (21 percent). A second Republican, Robert J. "Bob" Nain, polled 7,184 votes (6 percent).

In 1994, Hayes defeated a comeback bid by former Congressman Clyde C. Holloway of Forest Hill in Rapides Parish, Holloway's Louisiana's 8th congressional district having been eliminated and dismembered after the 1990 United States census. Hayes polled 72,424 votes (53 percent) to Holloway's 54,253 (40 percent).

Hayes left the Democrats on December 1, 1995, and joined the Republicans. He was one of several Conservative Democratic lawmakers, all from the South, including Nathan Deal of Georgia, Mike Parker of Mississippi, Greg Laughlin of Texas and fellow Louisianan Billy Tauzin, to switch to the Republican party during that time, as the Republicans had taken majorities in Congress in the 1994 elections. Hayes then ran for the United States Senate in 1996. He finished fifth in the nonpartisan blanket primary with almost 72,000 votes (6 percent). Republican Louis E. "Woody" Jenkins of Baton Rouge and Democrat Mary Landrieu of New Orleans then advanced to the tightly contested general election, which Landrieu narrowly won under protest.

In 1997, when Hayes retired from the House after unsuccessfully running for the Senate, his House seat was taken by Democrat Chris John of Crowley in Acadia Parish.

Hayes continues to be politically involved as a lobbyist. He appeared at a December 2008 event to raise funds for the successful reelection in 2010 of Republican U.S. Senator David Vitter.

== See also ==
- List of American politicians who switched parties in office
- List of United States representatives who switched parties

U.S. House of Representatives
Preceded by John Breaux	Member of the U.S. House of Representatives from Louisiana's 7th congressional district 1987–1997	Succeeded by Chris John
U.S. order of precedence (ceremonial)
Preceded by Steve Stivers as Former U.S. Representative	Order of precedence of the United States as Former U.S. Representative	Succeeded by Rodney Alexander as Former U.S. Representative
