= John Breaux =

American politician (born 1944)

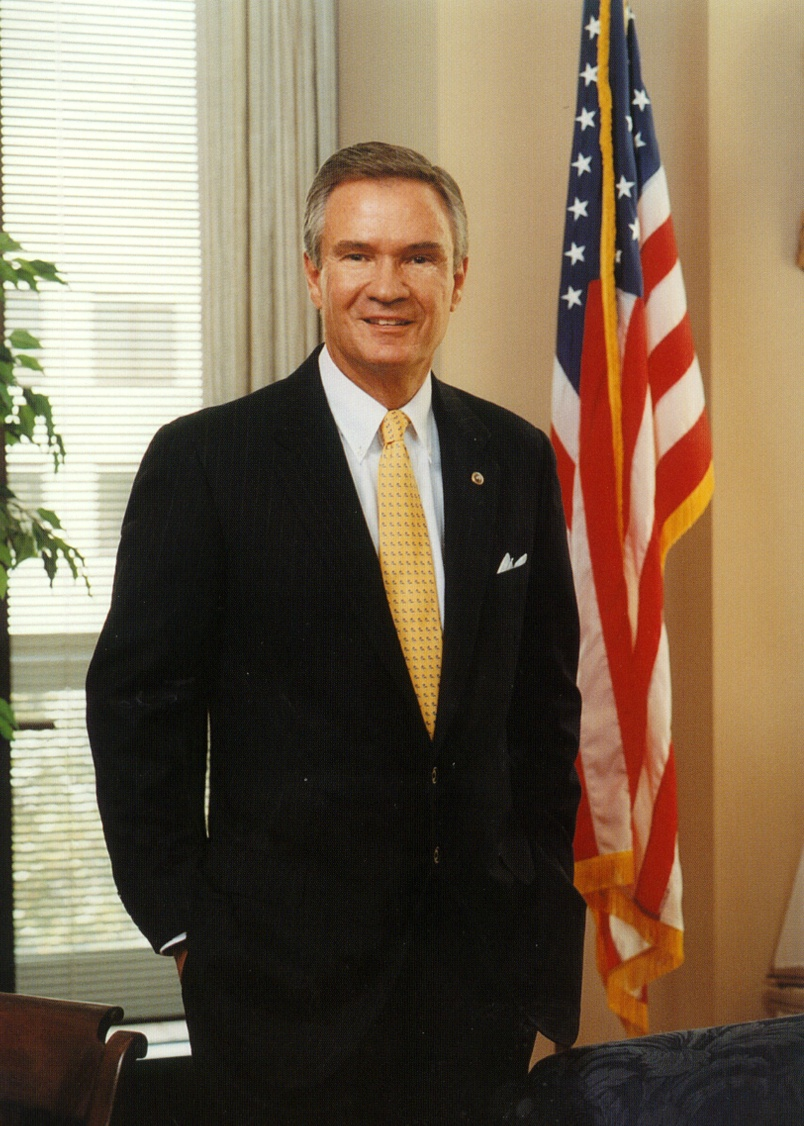

Chair of the Senate Aging Committee
- In office June 6, 2001 – January 3, 2003
- Preceded by: Larry Craig
- Succeeded by: Larry Craig

United States Senator from Louisiana
- In office January 3, 1987 – January 3, 2005
- Preceded by: Russell B. Long
- Succeeded by: David Vitter

Member of the U.S. House of Representatives from Louisiana's 7th district
- In office September 30, 1972 – January 3, 1987
- Preceded by: Edwin Edwards
- Succeeded by: Jimmy Hayes

Personal details
- Born: John Berlinger Breaux; March 1, 1944 (age 82) Crowley, Louisiana, U.S.
- Party: Democratic
- Spouse: Lois Daigle
- Children: 4
- Education: University of Louisiana at Lafayette (BA); Louisiana State University (JD)
- Breaux's voice Breaux on a bipartisan amendment to reduce the 2003 Bush tax cuts. Recorded March 20, 2003

John Berlinger Breaux (/ˈbroʊ/; born March 1, 1944) is an American lobbyist, attorney, and retired politician from Louisiana. He served in the U.S. House of Representatives from 1972 to 1987 and as a United States senator from 1987 to 2005. A Southern Democrat, he was considered one of the more conservative national legislators from the Democratic Party. Breaux was a member of the New Democrat Coalition.

After his congressional tenure, he became a lobbyist, co-founding the Breaux-Lott Leadership Group. The firm was later acquired by law and lobbying firm Patton Boggs, now Squire Patton Boggs.

== Early life and career ==
Breaux was born in Crowley, Louisiana, on March 1, 1944. He graduated with a Bachelor of Arts from the University of Southwestern Louisiana (now University of Louisiana at Lafayette) in 1964 and with a Juris Doctor from Louisiana State University in 1967. After graduation, he practiced law, and then served as an assistant to U.S. Representative Edwin Edwards. He is also an alumnus member of Lambda Chi Alpha fraternity.

== Congressional career ==
Breaux was elected as a Democrat to the 92nd Congress in a special election on September 30, 1972, to fill the vacancy created by Edwards' resignation in order to become governor. Breaux's campaign manager was Ron Faucheux, later a member of the Louisiana House of Representatives. At the age of 28, Breaux was the youngest member of the U.S. House of Representatives. Breaux was re-elected with ease to the seven succeeding Congresses and served until January 3, 1987.

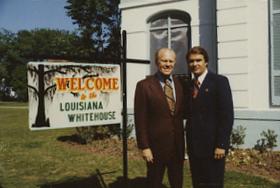
Breaux with President Gerald Ford in 1976

He was not a candidate for re-election to the House of Representatives in 1986, but was instead elected as a Democrat to the U.S. Senate.

Breaux opposed Ronald Reagan's nomination of Robert Bork to the U.S. Supreme Court. On October 23, 1987, he voted with all but two Democrats, and six Republicans to defeat his nomination by a 42-58 vote.

On October 15, 1991, Breaux was one of seven Southern Democrats who voted to confirm the nomination of Clarence Thomas to the U.S. Supreme Court in a 52-48 vote, the narrowest margin of approval in more than a century.

Breaux was seen as a centrist in a Senate divided along partisan lines, and was frequently sought out by Republican leaders to corral a few Democratic votes when they needed them; conversely he also often served as the Democratic emissary in attempts to gather a few moderate Republicans to win votes on their proposals. He was pro-life and a supporter of Second Amendment rights, although he gradually moderated his position on gun control. He was more conservative on taxes than most in his party and challenged many environmental protections. He voted in favor of the North American Free Trade Agreement (NAFTA), welfare reform, the balanced budget amendment, and tighter bankruptcy laws. He was a key Democratic supporter of Republican attempts to abolish the estate tax and in 2001 was among the minority of Democrats to support Bush's tax cut and opposed virtually all attempts by Democrats to alter it. However Breaux had voted with the majority of Democrats in favor of the 1993 Budget. In 2003, he submitted an amendment to reduce the tax cut to $350 billion. In 1995, he notably voted twice with more liberal elements of his party against the widely approved lawsuit reform measures, the Common Sense Product Liability and Legal Reform Act and the Private Securities Litigation Reform Act. Both acts were vetoed by President Bill Clinton, although the second act was passed over his veto.

On June 22, 2004, Breaux cast the lone vote against amendment, S.A. 3464, which would increase the maximum fine from $27,500 to $275,000 when the FCC determines a broadcaster is guilty of "obscene, indecent or profane language." Breaux also opposed the loosening of FCC rules that would allow cross-media platforms in the same community to fall under a single owner.

In 1993, Breaux was elected by Senate Democrats as Deputy Majority Whip, a position he held until his retirement. He also held a number of key Senate committee positions. A senior member of the Finance Committee, Senator Breaux served as the chairman of the Subcommittee on Social Security and Family Policy. From his position on the Finance Committee, he helped build the coalition that passed welfare reform and health insurance reform bills in 1996. He also pushed for a reduction in the capital gains tax and for tax relief for college education expenses. In 1998, Breaux was selected by the White House and House and Senate leaders to chair the National Bipartisan Commission on the Future of Medicare. Also in 1998, Senator Breaux co-chaired the National Commission on Retirement Policy, which produced legislation to help reform Social Security.

Breaux was the principal architect of the $400 billion Medicare Prescription Drug Modernization Act.

Breaux was a founder of the bipartisan Senate Centrist Coalition and served as chairman of the Democratic Leadership Council.

Breaux's state director and press secretary was the journalist Robert "Bob" Mann, who holds the Douglas Manship Chair of Journalism at Louisiana State University.

In the 2003 Louisiana gubernatorial campaign, after flirting briefly with the possibility of running himself, Breaux campaigned hard for the successful Democratic candidate, Kathleen Babineaux Blanco of Lafayette. That same year, Breaux was inducted into the Louisiana Political Museum and Hall of Fame in Winnfield.

He announced that he would not run for re-election in 2004; by most accounts he was so popular that it was believed he would have easily won a fourth term had he chosen to run again. He was succeeded in the Senate by Republican David Vitter of suburban New Orleans. Despite Breaux's popularity, he was unable to dictate his successor in the Senate, as Russell Long and J. Bennett Johnston, Jr. had done. He endorsed Democrat Chris John, the U.S. representative from the seventh district, which Breaux had once represented. However, John came second in the jungle primary to Republican David Vitter. Vitter won 51% of the vote, which allowed him to avoid a runoff election.

== Post-congressional career ==
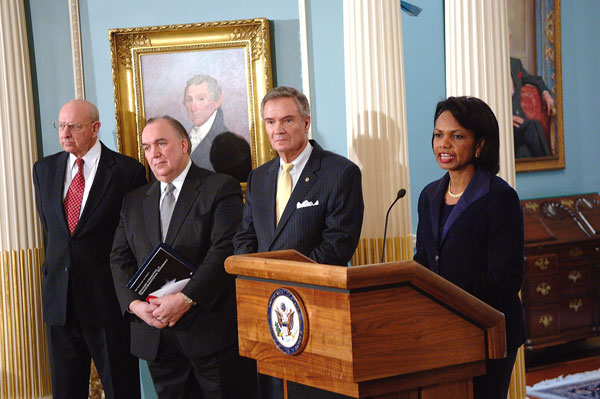
Secretary Condoleezza Rice with (left to right): Tom Pickering, John Engler and John Breaux at the presentation of Final Report of the Secretary's Advisory Committee on Transformational Diplomacy

In February 2005, Breaux took a position as Distinguished Professor in the Douglas Manship School of Mass Communication at Louisiana State University in Baton Rouge. Since 2005, Breaux has been a lobbyist for Washington, DC, firm Squire Patton Boggs, specializing in issues of health care and energy law.

Since leaving office, Breaux has spearheaded his own national campaign, "Ceasefire on Health Care: Finding Common Ground for the Uninsured." Breaux coined the campaign name as a play on the CNN TV program Crossfire, which he points out has been canceled. Breaux has hosted multiple events with prominent members of both parties to establish a dialogue that will lead to real healthcare reform. Breaux developed the campaign alongside American University's Center for Congressional and Presidential Studies.

Beginning in February 2007, there was much speculation among Louisiana political commentators as to whether Breaux would announce his candidacy in the 2007 Louisiana governors' race. Breaux, arguably the most popular Democratic politician in Louisiana, was considering entering the race, if Blanco would be willing to step aside for Breaux. On March 20, 2007, Blanco announced that she would not run for re-election as governor. On March 29, 2007, John Breaux made his first Louisiana public appearance since speculation began concerning his potential candidacy. Breaux said that he intended to run, and would announce his candidacy as soon as Louisiana Attorney General Charles Foti, a Democrat, gave a formal legal opinion on whether Breaux was eligible to run. It was alleged that he would not meet the residency requirements to run for governor as he is registered to vote, and has listed his primary address in Maryland since 2005. At issue was the clause in the Louisiana constitution that states that a candidate for governor must be a 'citizen' of the State of Louisiana; what constitutes a citizen is not defined.

On April 13, 2007, Breaux released a statement that he would not be running for governor. Attorney-General Foti had declined to issue an opinion on Breaux's eligibility, stating it was an issue for the courts to decide. Breaux stated that he did not want the issue of eligibility to overshadow his campaign, as a court challenge would not occur until September.

Breaux also serves on the board of directors for CSX Transportation.

In 2021, Breaux was involved in efforts to lobby against taxation of large inheritances.

In Acadiana, and in honor of the legacy Breaux has left behind, a local Japanese restaurant chain named a sushi roll after him, the John Breaux, with crawfish and avocado.

U.S. House of Representatives
Preceded by Edwin Edwards	Member of the U.S. House of Representatives from Louisiana's 7th congressional district 1972–1987	Succeeded by Jimmy Hayes
Party political offices
Preceded by Russell B. Long	Democratic nominee for U.S. Senator from Louisiana (Class 3); 1986, 1992, 1998	Succeeded by Chris John
Preceded by John Kerry	Chair of the Democratic Senatorial Campaign Committee; 1989–1991	Succeeded by Chuck Robb
Preceded by Bill Clinton	Chair of the Democratic Leadership Council; 1991–1993	Succeeded by Dave McCurdy
Preceded by Alan J. Dixon	Senate Democratic Chief Deputy Whip; 1993–2005	Succeeded by Barbara Boxer
U.S. Senate
Preceded by Russell B. Long	U.S. Senator (Class 3) from Louisiana; 1987–2005; Served alongside: Bennett Johnston, Mary Landrieu	Succeeded by David Vitter
Preceded by David Pryor	Ranking Member of the Senate Aging Committee; 1997–2001	Succeeded by Larry Craig
Preceded by Larry Craig	Chair of the Senate Aging Committee; 2001–2003	Succeeded by Larry Craig
Preceded by Larry Craig	Ranking Member of the Senate Aging Committee; 2003–2005	Succeeded by Herb Kohl
U.S. order of precedence (ceremonial)
Preceded by Sherrod Brown as Former U.S. Senator	Order of precedence of the United States as Former U.S. Senator	Succeeded by Mary Landrieu as Former U.S. Senator
