= Cleveland Dear =

American politician (1888–1950)

Cleveland Dear Sr.
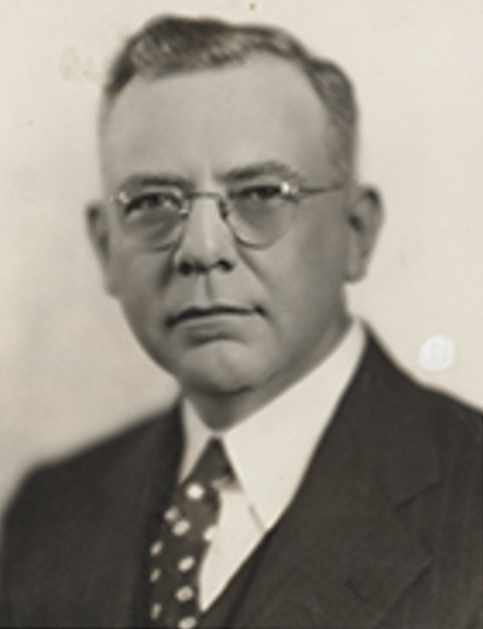
- U.S. House of Representatives photo circa 1934

Member of the United States House of Representatives
- In office March 4, 1933 – January 3, 1937
- Preceded by: John H. Overton
- Succeeded by: A. Leonard Allen
- Constituency: Louisiana's 8th congressional district

Personal details
- Born: August 22, 1888 Sugartown, Beauregard Parish, Louisiana, U.S.
- Died: December 30, 1950 (aged 62) Alexandria, Rapides Parish, Louisiana, U.S.
- Resting place: Greenwood Memorial Park, Pineville, Louisiana, U.S.
- Party: Democratic
- Spouse: Marion Suzanne Anderson (m. 1921)
- Children: 2
- Education: Louisiana State University; Louisiana State University Law Center
- Occupation: Attorney

Military service
- Service: United States Army
- Years of service: 1917–1918
- Rank: First Lieutenant (Army); Captain (Organized Reserve Corps)
- Unit: 87th Division; 11th Division
- Battles/wars: World War I

Cleveland Dear Sr. (August 22, 1888 – December 30, 1950), was a two-term U.S. representative for Louisiana's 8th congressional district, since disbanded, a district attorney, a state court judge, and a candidate in 1936 for governor of Louisiana.

== Background ==
Dear was the youngest of eleven children born to Mississippi natives James Mackburn Dear (1846–1925) and the former Sarah Jane Harper (1849–1932) in Sugartown in Beauregard Parish in western Louisiana. After early education in country schools, Dear graduated from Louisiana State University and its Paul M. Hebert Law Center, both in Baton Rouge. He was a member of Sigma Alpha Epsilon fraternity. In 1914, he received his law degree and was admitted that same year to the bar. At first, he was in partnership in Alexandria in Rapides Parish in Central Louisiana, with Frank H. Peterman in the firm Peterman & Dear. When V. H. Peterman, the father of Frank Peterman joined the firm, it became Peterman, Dear & Peterman. The firm handled local interests of the Texas & Pacific Railway and the Louisiana Railway and Navigation Company.

On April 8, 1917, two days after the American entrance into World War I, Dear entered the United States Army officers' training camp at Fort Logan H. Roots in Arkansas, from which he received his commission as a second lieutenant of Field Artillery. He was then assigned to the 87th Division, which was undergoing organization and training at Camp Pike, Arkansas. When the 87 Division departed for France, several experienced soldiers including Dear were assigned form the nucleus of a new unit, the 11th Division, which was being organized at Fort Meade, Maryland. The war ended before the 11th Division could be transported to France, and Dear was discharged on December 14, 1918. He later served as a captain in the Organized Reserve Corps and was active in the newly established American Legion and other veterans' organizations.

In April 1921, Dear married the former Marion Suzanne Anderson (died 1969), a native of Chicago, Illinois, who later resided in Milwaukee, Wisconsin. The couple had a daughter, Marion Dear Weber (1923–2009), and a son, Cleveland "Cleve" Dear Jr. (1928–2015), a petroleum engineering graduate of both the Colorado School of Mines in Golden, Colorado, and LSU, who spent his later years with his wife and three children in Junction in Kimble County, Texas, where he died at the age of eighty-seven.

Dear was a Baptist deacon; his wife was Episcopalian. He was active in the Masonic lodge, the Shriners, and the Benevolent and Protective Order of Elks.

== Political life ==
In 1920, Dear was elected district attorney for the 9th Judicial District based in Alexandria, a position that he held until his election in 1932 to the U.S. House. In Congress, he was the chairman of the House Committee on Elections No. 1.

In 1936, Dear ran to succeed Governor James A. Noe of Monroe, who had briefly served upon the death of Oscar K. Allen of Winnfield. Noe and Allen were the political heirs of Huey Long, who had been assassinated at the Louisiana State Capitol in 1935. Dear ran as the anti-Long candidate in the race; he lost to the pro-Long Richard Leche of New Orleans, 67% to 33%.

Dear then resumed the practice of law and was subsequently appointed judge in the Ninth Judicial District, a position which he retained with subsequent successful elections until his death. His last judicial nomination was in the Democratic primary held in August 1948.

He died in Alexandria and is interred at Greenwood Memorial Park in Pineville.

U.S. House of Representatives
Preceded by John H. Overton	Member of the U.S. House of Representatives from Louisiana's 8th congressional district 1933–1937	Succeeded by A. Leonard Allen
