= Dudley J. LeBlanc =

Louisiana businessman and politician

Dudley Joseph LeBlanc
- Dudley J. LeBlanc, circa 1950s

Louisiana State Senator for reconfigured Vermilion and Acadia parishes
- In office 1968 – October 22, 1971 (aged 77)
- Preceded by: New district
- Succeeded by: James E. Fontenot

Louisiana State Senator for Vermilion and Acadia parishes
- In office 1964–1968
- Preceded by: Lee C. Firmin
- Succeeded by: District redrawn

President Pro Tempore of the Louisiana State Senate
- In office 1948–1952
- Preceded by: Grove Stafford
- Succeeded by: Robert Andrew Ainsworth, Jr.

Louisiana State Senator for Vermilion Parish
- In office 1948–1952
- Preceded by: Leonard C. Wise
- Succeeded by: C. C. Burleigh

Louisiana State Senator for Vermilion Parish
- In office 1940–1944
- Preceded by: Wilber P. Kramer
- Succeeded by: Leonard C. Wise

Louisiana Public Service Commissioner
- In office 1926–1932

Louisiana State Representative for Vermilion Parish
- In office 1924–1926
- Preceded by: Two-member district: Emmett W. Henry and A. M. Smith
- Succeeded by: E. Whitney Bonin

Personal details
- Born: August 16, 1894 Capitan, Louisiana, Lafayette Parish, Louisiana, U.S.
- Died: October 22, 1971 (aged 77) Abbeville, Louisiana, Vermilion Parish, Louisiana, U.S.
- Resting place: St. Mary Magdalen Church Cemetery, Abbeville, Louisiana
- Party: Democratic
- Spouse: Evelyn Hebert LeBlanc (m. 1919; his death 1971)
- Children: 6
- Education: Erath High School · University of Louisiana at Lafayette
- Occupation: Businessman

Military service
- Allegiance: United States
- Branch/service: United States Army
- Battles/wars: World War I

Dudley J. LeBlanc (August 16, 1894 – October 22, 1971) was an American entrepreneur and politician.

== Early life ==
Dudley J. LeBlanc was born on August 16, 1894 in Capitan, Louisiana, to Noemie and Numa Dulze LeBlanc. His father was a blacksmith, and they raised Dudley in Erath, Louisiana. At age 18, LeBlanc graduated from Southwestern Louisiana Institute (today's University of Louisiana at Lafayette). While he was in school, he started an ironing business, which grew into a tailoring store. When he graduated, he began a career in sales and then in 1916 he joined the US Army and served as a sergeant during World War I. In 1921, he married Evelyn Hebert (1897–1992) of Abbeville, Louisiana and they had six children.

LeBlanc's childhood home has been moved to the Acadian Village folk life museum.

== Political career ==
=== State representative (1924–1926) ===
LeBlanc was elected to serve in the Louisiana House of Representatives from 1924 to 1928. He served half a term, and then he was elected to one of the three seats on the Louisiana Public Service Commission.

During his short tenure as state representative, LeBlanc introduced several notable pieces of legislation.

- Louisiana Rice Warehouse Commission: LeBlanc's bill created this commission to promote buying graded rice, which aimed to benefit rice farmers who previously had to sell all their rice at a single price regardless of grade.

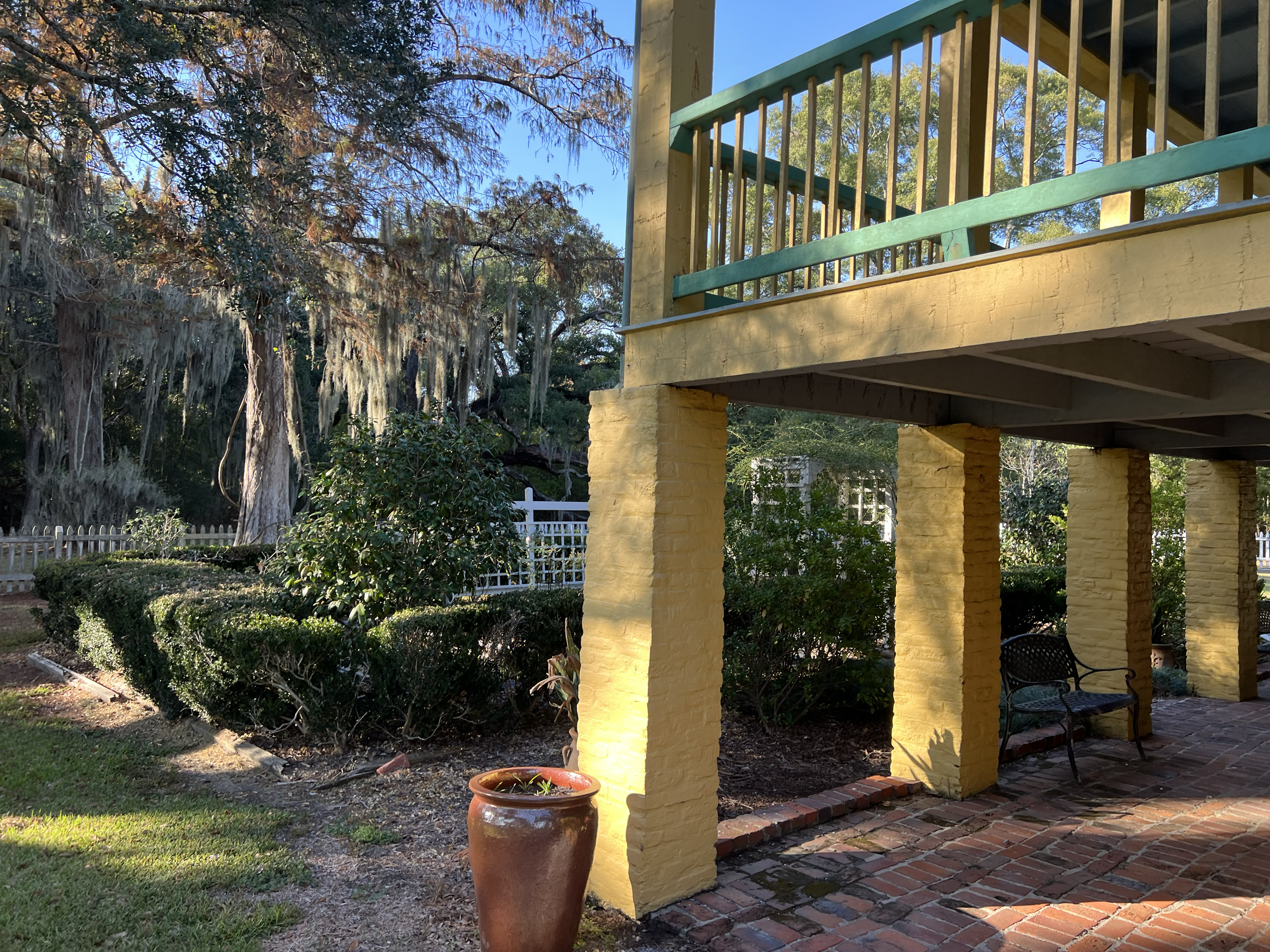
Evangeline State Park (now named Longfellow-Evangeline State Historic Site)

- Evangeline State Park: A state park district was created in 1922 to establish a park in the congressional district; LeBlanc's bill appropriated $15,000 (equivalent to $292,000 in 2026) to buy park land in honor of Acadians. The state bought the Pierre Olivier du Clozel plantation in the outskirts of St. Martinville. Olivier (1782–1840) was a French nobleman. Susan Walker Anding, who like LeBlanc formed groups of "Evangeline Girls," promoted making the Acadian memorial park specifically a monument to Longfellow and the Evangeline poem. In 1934, this would become the first park in the state's park system.
- Protection for indebted tenant farmers and sharecroppers during the interwar farm crisis: LeBlanc's bill prohibited lenders from seizing a farmer's seeds and plants (their "tools of the trade"), effectively destroying their livelihood and forcing small landowners off their property.

=== Member of Louisiana Public Service Commission (1926–1932) ===
French was widely spoken as the primary language in many southern Louisiana communities, while people in northern Louisiana mostly spoke English. By the late 1800s, French speakers in Louisiana were discriminated against, and in 1921 the Louisiana Constitution effectively established English as the official language by banning French in public schools. Teachers physically punished students for speaking French. It was in this climate that LeBlanc campaigned in both languages, gaining national attention and winning one of the then-three seats on the Louisiana Public Service Commission.

While he served as a member of the commission, he also wrote his first book, The True Story of the Acadians.

=== Louisiana gubernatorial election (1932, 1944, 1952) ===
In 1932, LeBlanc ran for governor and greatly revised and republished his book, The True Story of the Acadians.

In the 1932 Louisiana gubernatorial election, he lost to Oscar K. Allen, who was favored by Huey Long. During his campaign, one of LeBlanc's plans was to pay a monthly stipend to the elderly. Huey Long subsequently adopted the idea in his nascent campaign for President. Franklin D. Roosevelt got the idea from Long, and it became the modern Social Security system.

=== State senator (1940–1944, 1948–1952, 1964–1968, 1968–1971) ===
LeBlanc served four terms in Louisiana's state senate, dying in his last term.

In early 1951, LeBlanc was a guest on Groucho Marx's show, You Bet Your Life. He talked about representing the needs of the poor and working-class, told a joke in French, and made a quip about Hadacol.

== Acadian and Cajun advocacy ==
LeBlanc was interested in the forced mass deportation of French settlers from the Canadian Maritime provinces by British Authorities in the mid-1700s. Some of these Acadians ultimately arrived in Spanish-held Louisiana where they founded today's Cajun community. LeBlanc went to Europe and Canada to research this history from primary sources, and translated those sources from French to English. He also researched his own genealogy, and found he was related to René LeBlanc, a notary public at Grand-Pré, Nova Scotia whose family was torn apart in the Expulsion, and who died in exile in Philadelphia. René LeBlanc also appears in Henry Wadsworth Longfellow's 1847 poem, Evangeline, A Tale of Acadie as the wise old notary who arrives to prepare Evangeline and Gabriel's marriage contract. The Acadians in Louisiana celebrated this poem as an important fictional epic story of their own beginnings and the poem's Evangeline became a symbol for Acadian perseverance.

In 1926, as state representative, LeBlanc introduced legislation that appropriated the funds needed to buy a park to honor Acadians; today that park is the Longfellow-Evangeline State Historic Site. At this time, he also began campaigning for political office in French as well as English, winning a seat on the Louisiana Public Service Commission. In 1927, he published The True Story of the Acadians.

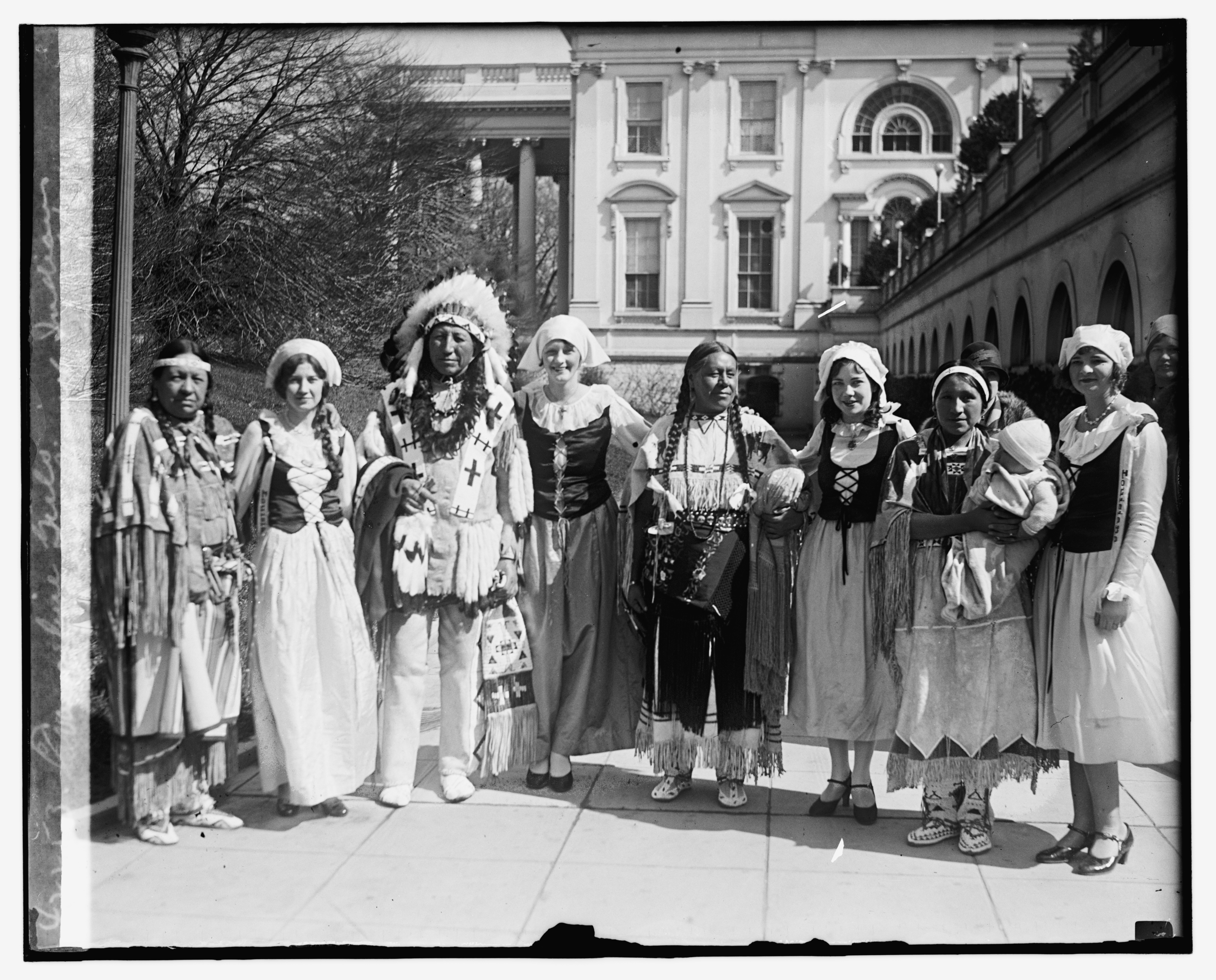
1929 photo titled, "Evangeline Girls and Sioux Indians", outside the former East Wing of the White House

"Evangeline Girls" were young women who attended public events in traditional clothes to bring awareness to Acadian culture in Louisiana. As President of the Association of Louisiana Acadians, he organized "pilgrimages" of Louisiana Acadians and Evangeline Girls to Nova Scotia in 1930, 1936, and 1963 to increase ethnic pride and cultural awareness, stopping at the White House to meet Presidents Herbert Hoover, Franklin D. Roosevelt, and John F. Kennedy on these trips. After LeBlanc's 1930 pilgrimage to Grand-Pré, the Canadians sent a delegation of their own "Evangelines" and "Gabriels" to Louisiana. The cultural exchanges as well as the larger pop culture fascination with the Evangeline story helped increase pride in Acadian heritage and also had the happy effect of substantially increasing tourism in Louisiana.

In 1932, he greatly revised and republished The True Story of the Acadians, and in 1966 he wrote The Acadian Miracle.

== Radio broadcasting and Hadacol ==
In 1946, LeBlanc was a radio newscaster, broadcasting in English and French.

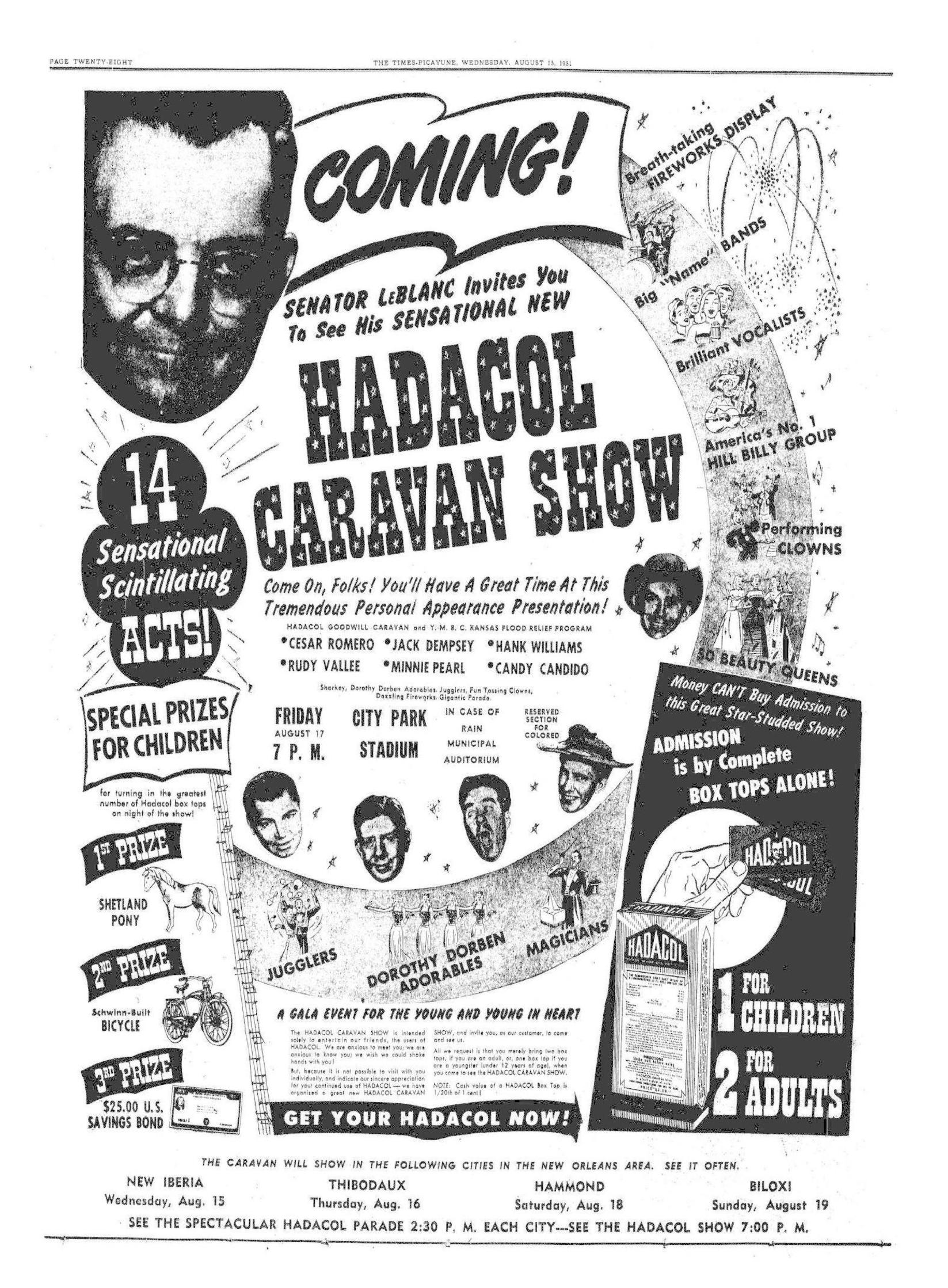
Promotional ad for the Hadacol Caravan Show

He also created the patent medicine Hadacol and promoted it through the 'Hadacol Caravan' which featured major celebrities of the day including Mickey Rooney, Ava Gardner, Cesar Romero, Hank Williams, and many others. Williams began writing the song 'Jambalaya' while traveling on the Hadacol bus, listening to the Cajun conversation.

== Death and legacy ==
LeBlanc died on October 22, 1971 and is buried at St. Mary Magdalen Church's cemetery in Abbeville, Louisiana, where LeBlanc had worshipped most of his life.

== Publications ==
- 1927; revised 1932: The True Story of the Acadians
- 1950: Good Health: Life's Greatest Blessing (privately published)
- 1966: The Acadian Miracle

== Awards and honors ==
LeBlanc was posthumously inducted into the Louisiana Political Museum and Hall of Fame in 1993.
