= 1932 Louisiana gubernatorial election =

1932 Louisiana Democratic gubernatorial primary
- January 19, 1932
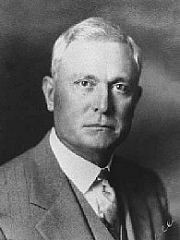

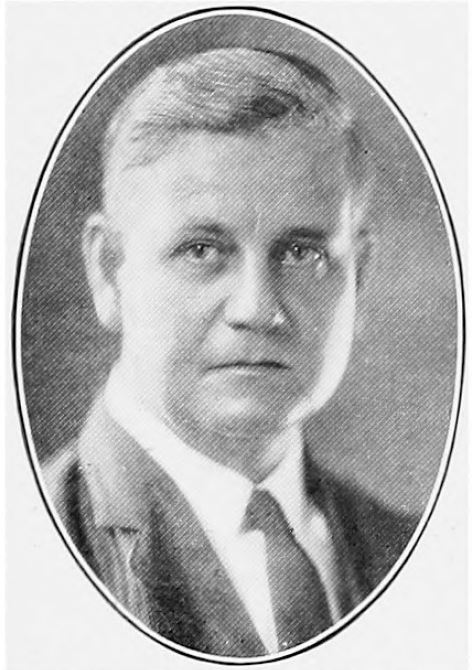
Candidate	Oscar K. Allen	Dudley J. LeBlanc	George Seth Guion
Party	Democratic	Democratic	Democratic
Popular vote	214,699	110,048	53,756
Percentage	56.51%	28.96%	14.15%
- Parish results Allen: 40–50% 50–60% 60–70% 70–80% 90–100% LeBlanc: 30–40% 40–50% 50–60% 60–70%
Governor before election
Alvin Olin King
Democratic
Elected Governor
Oscar K. Allen
Democratic

The 1932 Louisiana gubernatorial election was held in the US state on January 19, 1932. Like most Southern states between the Reconstruction Era and the Civil Rights Movement, Louisiana's Republican Party had virtually no electoral support. This meant that the Democratic Party primary held on this date was the real contest over who would be governor. The election resulted in the election of Oscar K. Allen as governor of Louisiana. Louisiana was one of only two states that held the election on a date other than the first Tuesday following the first Monday of November.

== Results ==
Democratic Party Primary, January 19

Candidate	Votes received	Percent
Oscar K. Allen	214,699	56.51%
Dudley J. LeBlanc	110,048	28.96%
George Seth Guion	53,756	14.15%
William C. Boone	976	0.26%
William L. Clark Jr.	470	0.12%

Preceded by 1928 gubernatorial election	Louisiana gubernatorial elections	Succeeded by 1936 gubernatorial election

== Sources ==
- State of Louisiana. Compilation of Primary Election Returns of the Democratic Party, State of Louisiana, 1932.
