= 1936 United States Senate special election in Louisiana =

- April 21, 1936
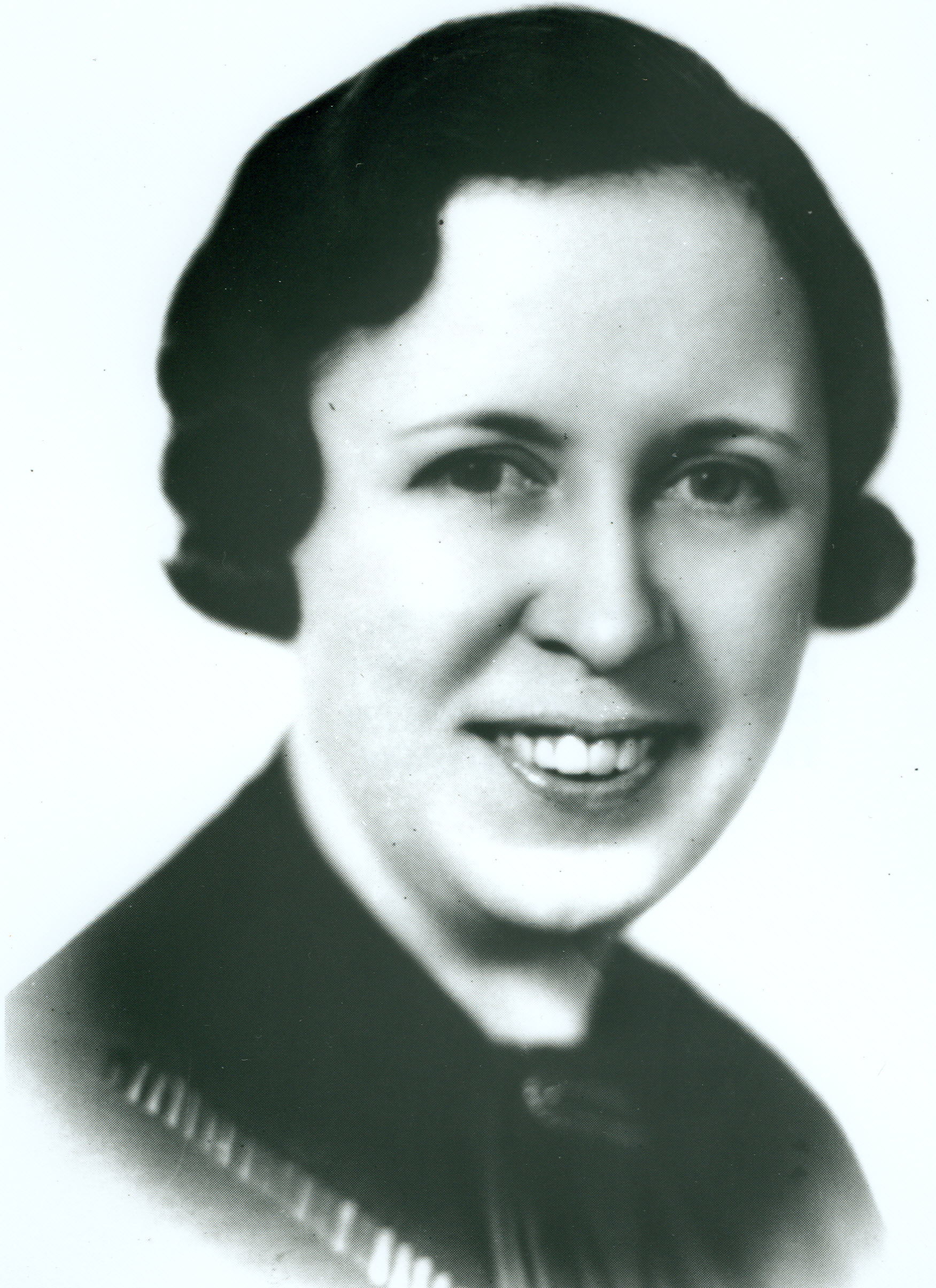
Nominee	Rose McConnell Long
Party	Democratic
Popular vote	131,930
Percentage	100.00%
- Parish results Long 90–100%
U.S. senator before election
Rose McConnell Long
Democratic
Elected U.S. Senator
Rose McConnell Long
Democratic

The 1936 United States Senate special election in Louisiana took place on April 21, 1936, to fill the remainder of the late former Senator Huey Long's six-year term. Long was first elected to the Senate in 1930 and was fatally shot by Carl Weiss on September 8, 1935 and died two days later.

Governor Oscar K. Allen won the Democratic primary, but died of a brain hemorrhage one week after the primary win. Following Allen's death, his successor as Governor, James A. Noe, appointed Long's widow, Rose McConnell Long to the Senate to fill the vacancy and the state Democratic Party named Long as its replacement nominee in the special election. Long was unopposed in the general election and won 100% of the vote, and served the final year of Long's term. She was not a candidate for re-election to a full term and was succeeded by State House Speaker Allen J. Ellender. Long was the first woman elected to the U.S. Senate from Louisiana.

== Democratic primary ==
=== Candidates ===
- Oscar K. Allen, incumbent Governor of Louisiana
- Frank J. Looney, Shreveport attorney
- Irving Ward-Steinman, Alexandria sociologist

=== Results ===
Democratic primary results
Party	Candidate	Votes	%
Democratic	Oscar K. Allen	368,115	68.72
Democratic	Frank J. Looney	160,566	29.97
Democratic	Irving Ward-Steinman	7,026	1.31
Total votes		535,707	100.00

On January 28, 1936, one week after Allen's victory in the Democratic primary, he died of a brain hemorrhage. Huey Long's widow, former First Lady Rose McConnell Long, was unanimously named by the Louisiana Democratic Party as its replacement nominee. Shortly thereafter, Governor James A. Noe appointed Long to fill the Senate vacancy.

== General election ==
=== Candidates ===
- Rose McConnell Long, incumbent U.S. Senator, former First Lady of Louisiana

=== Results ===
1936 United States Senate special election in Louisiana
Party	Candidate	Votes	%
Democratic	Rose McConnell Long (inc.)	131,930	100.00%
Democratic hold			

== See also ==
- 1936 United States Senate elections
