= Thomas C. Wingate =

American politician

Member of the Louisiana State Senate
- In office 1904–1908
- In office 1924–1939

36th Lieutenant Governor of Louisiana
- In office January 2, 1935 – February 26, 1935
- Governor: Oscar K. Allen
- Preceded by: John B. Fournet
- Succeeded by: James A. Noe

Personal details
- Born: October 10, 1866
- Died: November 9, 1939 (aged 73)
- Party: Democratic

Thomas C. Wingate (October 10, 1866 – November 9, 1939) was an American politician. He served as lieutenant governor of Louisiana in 1935.
