= 1936 Louisiana gubernatorial election =

1936 Louisiana Democratic gubernatorial primary
- January 21, 1936
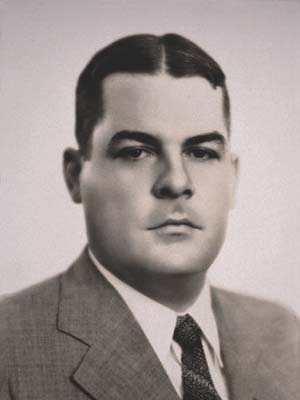

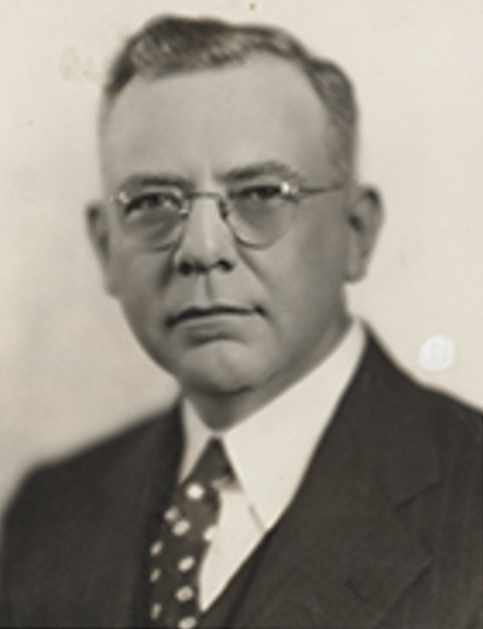
Candidate	Richard W. Leche	Cleveland Dear
Party	Democratic	Democratic
Alliance	Longite	Anti-Long
Popular vote	362,502	176,150
Percentage	67.08%	32.60%
- Parish results Leche: 50–60% 60–70% 70–80% 80–90% >90% Dear: 50–60%
Governor before election
James A. Noe
Democratic
Elected Governor
Richard W. Leche
Democratic

The 1936 Louisiana gubernatorial election was held on January 21, 1936. Like most Southern states between the Reconstruction Era and the Civil Rights Movement, Louisiana's Republican Party was virtually nonexistent in terms of electoral support. This meant that the Democratic Party primary held on this date was the real contest over who would be governor. The election resulted in the victory of Richard W. Leche of New Orleans as governor. Leche was supported by the Longite faction of the party and Cleveland Dear of Alexandria by the anti-Longs' "Home Rule" ticket. State Representative Mason Spencer of Tallulah dropped out of the race and endorsed Dear, but the ballots had already been printed, and he received nearly two thousand votes.

== Results ==
Democratic Party Primary, January 21

Candidate	Votes received	Percent
Richard W. Leche	362,502	67.08%
Cleveland Dear	176,150	32.60%
Leonard Mason Spencer	1,718	0.32%
