= George Caldwell (Louisiana official) =

George A. Caldwell
- Born: August 24, 1892; Abbeville, Vermilion Parish; Louisiana, USA
- Died: March 12, 1966 (aged 73); Baton Rouge, Louisiana
- Resting place: Resthaven Garden of Memories and Mausoleum in Baton Rouge
- Occupation: Building contractor
- Political party: Democratic
- Spouse(s): (1) Zellie Belle Wahl Caldwell (2) Margaret Longmire Caldwell (married 1948–1966, his death)
- Parent(s): Charlie and Camille LeBlanc Caldwell

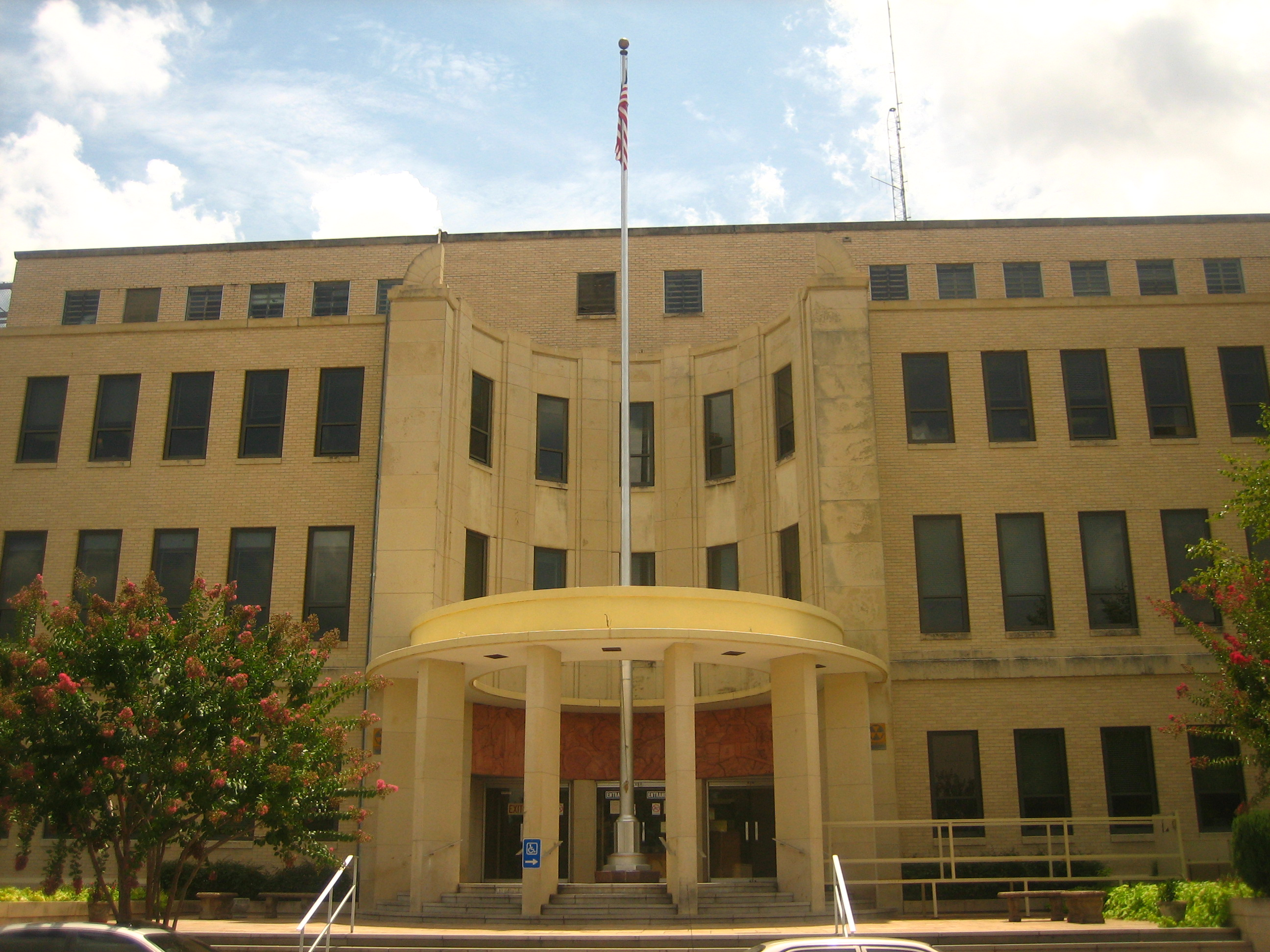
The Webster Parish Courthouse (1953) in Minden, Louisiana, is among the public projects constructed by contractor George A. Caldwell.

George A. Caldwell, sometimes known as Big George Caldwell (August 24, 1892 – March 12, 1966), was a Louisiana building contractor and state official. In the 1930s, during the Great Depression, he served as Superintendent for Construction at Louisiana State University, where he was known to "rake off 2 per cent of the cost of all building projects." Caldwell managed the construction of nine buildings on the campus as federal Public Works Administration (PWA) projects in Baton Rouge. These included the university library and the structures housing the dairying and physics departments.

He also built three parish courthouses, and numerous other major public projects during his career. In what were called the "Louisiana scandals", in 1939 Caldwell was indicted for misuse of PWA funds and pleaded guilty to federal charges. He was one of several top-ranking Louisiana leaders convicted and jailed in this scandal, including Governor Richard W. Leche. Sentenced to four years in prison in 1940, Caldwell was paroled in 1941. Later in the 1940s, he was pardoned by President Harry Truman. After that, Caldwell returned to business, getting commissions to construct public buildings, such as parish courthouses.

== Biography ==
George A. Caldwell was born in 1892 Abbeville, the seat of government of Vermillion Parish in southwestern Louisiana, to Charlie Caldwell and the former Camille LeBlanc. He was reared Roman Catholic. After his parents died when he was young, George was cared for by his paternal uncle Summerfield "Summa" Caldwell, who had founded a contracting firm in Abbeville with two other brothers, Vernon and Tom. The latter was a master bricklayer. George became interested in the firm and started working there when young; he became its leader, as Summa's son was involved in other activities in New Orleans. Monte Hart also became a partner of Caldwell Brothers and Hart, which had a prominent role in Louisiana's major public building projects in the 1930s and for the next two decades.

After getting his work underway, Caldwell married Zellie Belle Wahl.

In his total career, Caldwell built "twenty-six major buildings throughout the state, including six hospitals, East Baton Rouge Parish and Webster Parish courthouses; the Louisiana State Library; the Louisiana State University Library (Baton Rouge); the state highway department office building; five churches; two church youth centers; five schools; the Grambling University Science Building; and the dairy and physics buildings at LSU-Baton Rouge."

=== Superintendent of Construction ===
In the 1930s, Caldwell was appointed as State Superintendent of Construction, during which time he completed several WPA projects at LSU. Governor Richard W. Leche had benefited by the late Senator Huey Long's alliance with President Franklin D. Roosevelt, and the state received funds from the Public Works Administration for major projects.

Caldwell had a talent for organization and swift construction. Under his direction, the Panhellion, one of the Works Progress Administration projects on the LSU campus, was completed in thirty days. Another (Building "G") was completed in ten days. Neither is still standing.

Investigations later revealed that Caldwell was keeping 2 percent of the funds budgeted for the construction projects at LSU. He built a lavish mansion near the university; it was estimated to have cost $45,000, then a large amount of money. The mansion featured air conditioning, solid gold bathroom fixtures, and black marble floors, ceilings and walls. Caldwell's salary at the time was $6,000 annually.

The New Orleans States newspaper began publishing exposés of the corruption scandals in early 1939. With state and federal investigations underway into what was called the "Louisiana Hayride" scandals, Caldwell was asked to resign as superintendent. In 1939, he and his successor were arrested for violating the Federal Emergency Relief Act. Caldwell was later indicted by a federal grand jury on a number of other charges related to misusing WPA funds.

The prosecutor, Malcolm Lafargue of the United States District Court for the Western District of Louisiana in Shreveport, alleged that Caldwell and his cronies were using federal funds to pay contractors for work conducted at their own houses. Caldwell ultimately pleaded guilty to seven federal charges. State officials convicted and jailed at the same time as Caldwell in this scandal included Governor Richard W. Leche, whose offenses also included illegal oil dealing; LSU President James Monroe Smith, and LSU Business Manager E. S. Jackson. Monte Hart, Caldwell's partner in his firm, was convicted of contracting-related charges and died before serving his sentence. The two-year sentence of Dr. Clarence Lorio was suspended; he was president of the Louisiana State Medical Society.

After being convicted of tax evasion and bribery, for requiring kickbacks from contractors, Caldwell was sentenced in 1940 to four years in a federal prison. In 1941, he was paroled. He was subsequently pardoned by U.S. President Harry Truman. He later gained new commissions for construction of public buildings, such as parish courthouses. Caldwell Brothers had a prominent role in the state into the 1950s.

Caldwell married for a second time in 1948 to Margaret Longmire.

Caldwell died in Baton Rouge in 1966 at the age of seventy-three. He is interred in the Garden of Faith plot at Resthaven Gardens of Memory and Mausoleum in Baton Rouge. His second wife Margaret, who died in 1983, is interred beside him; her grave is unmarked.

== See also ==
- List of people pardoned or granted clemency by the president of the United States

== Sources ==
- Kane, Harnett Thomas (1971), Huey Long's Louisiana Hayride: The American Rehearsal for Dictatorship 1928-1940, Baton Rouge, Louisiana: Pelican Publishing, ISBN 9781455606115
