= Richard W. Leche =

American politician (1898–1965)

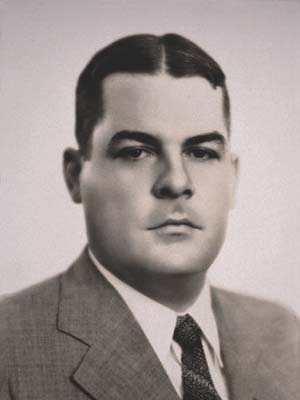

44th Governor of Louisiana
- In office May 12, 1936 – June 26, 1939
- Lieutenant: Earl K. Long
- Preceded by: James A. Noe
- Succeeded by: Earl K. Long

Personal details
- Born: May 17, 1898 New Orleans, Louisiana, U.S.
- Died: February 22, 1965 (aged 66) New Orleans, Louisiana, U.S.
- Resting place: Metairie Cemetery
- Party: Democratic
- Spouse: Elton Reynolds
- Education: Tulane University (BA); Loyola University New Orleans (LLB)
- Profession: Lawyer

Military service
- Allegiance: United States
- Branch/service: United States Army
- Battles/wars: World War I

Richard Webster Leche (/lɛʃ/ "lesh") (May 17, 1898 – February 22, 1965) was an American attorney, judge, and politician, elected as the 44th governor of Louisiana. He served from 1936 until 1939, when he resigned. Convicted on federal charges of misuse of federal funds, Leche was the first Louisiana chief executive to be imprisoned.

== Background ==
Richard Webster Leche was born in New Orleans, the son of Eustace Leche, a salesman, and the former Stella Eloise (Richard), a teacher. After attending local schools and graduating from Warren Easton High School, Leche entered Tulane University in 1916. His studies were interrupted when he enlisted in the United States Army as the U.S. entered the First World War. After being discharged without having seen combat, Leche briefly moved to Chicago, where he sold automobile parts.

He returned to Louisiana, where he studied law and graduated from Loyola University Law School. He passed the bar and started a law practice in 1923.

In 1928, Leche ran unsuccessfully for the Louisiana State Senate. By 1930, Leche had joined with Governor Huey Pierce Long Jr., and managed Long's campaign for the United States Senate in the fall of that year. When Long was elected to the Senate in 1932, he appointed Leche as secretary to Oscar K. Allen, who had succeeded him as governor. Leche's job was to keep an eye on Allen and report back to Long on a daily basis. In 1934, Long gained appointment of Leche as a state appeals court judge in New Orleans.

== Leche as governor ==
After Huey Long was assassinated in September 1935, the Long organization was left without a leader and without a candidate for the 1936 gubernatorial election. During a period of backroom maneuvering, Longite leaders chose the relatively minor Leche as a compromise candidate. The prominent leaders were New Orleans mayor Robert Maestri, outgoing governor Oscar K. Allen, James A. Noe, Seymour Weiss, and Abe Shushan. Despite his relative obscurity, Leche beat the anti-Long candidate Cleveland Dear, a U.S. representative from Alexandria, with the aid of the still-powerful Long machine. Leche polled 67 percent of the primary vote, and the anti-Long forces seemed beyond recovery. Outgoing State Representative Mason Spencer of Madison, who had uncannily predicted Long's bloody death some five months before it happened, withdrew as a gubernatorial candidate to support Dear, but he still polled nearly two thousand votes because his exodus came too late to remove his name from the ballot. (In this period, most African Americans were still prevented from voting by state barriers to voter registration, so the only competitive politics took place within the Democratic party.)

Upon taking office during the Great Depression, Leche outlined a 26-point plan of improvement for his state, including a vow to continue most Long programs. He proposed a tax on soft drinks, a $2,000 homestead exemption, extending the homestead exemption to surviving spouses and widows, keeping public payrolls at the maximum to reduce unemployment, and establishing a state department of industry and commerce.

Leche continued Long's program of road-building, free textbooks, and expansion of hospital and educational facilities. At the same time however, he ceased attacks on the oil industry, granted tax exemptions to new businesses and industries, and enacted a regressive sales tax. These policies brought Leche support from the press and the business community, two of Huey Long's staunchest foes.

Nevertheless, Leche was (like Long) ideologically progressive, supporting measures such as legislation designed to improve working conditions. In 1938, for instance, Leche voiced his support for President Roosevelt's wage-hour law during an address to the American Federation of Labor (AFL) in 1938, while also praising Roosevelt for describing the South as "the nation's number one economic problem." Leche was himself praised by AFL president William Green as an executive "with a progressive and liberal attitude toward modern day social and economic problems." Indeed, a number of progressive labor laws were introduced during Leche's time as governor. An Act of February the 7th 1938 provided for extended coverage of unemployment compensation benefits while extending the maximum duration of such benefits from 15 to 18 weeks and also reducing the waiting period (as noted by one study) “from 4 weeks within 52 consecutive weeks to 2 weeks within 26.” Two Acts approved on June the 7th 1938 introduced limits on night work and working hours for women in various industries, while also providing the Commissioner of Labor to ensure the safety of boilers. An Act of June the 7th 1938 established a minimum-wage division within the Department of Labor, with the aim of establishing standards of labour conditions and minimum wages for women and girls who worked in any industry in municipalities with a population of over 100,000 people.

Several reforms in other areas were enacted during Leche's time as governor. Free dental care and vegetable seed packets were provided to those in need, a retirement system for teachers was established, and a tenure law was introduced that aimed to safeguard the jobs of teachers from political influence. Pay for teachers was improved while free pencils, erasers and papers were provided to students. New hospitals and roads were built, while state supplements for schools were increased and state old age pensions were introduced.

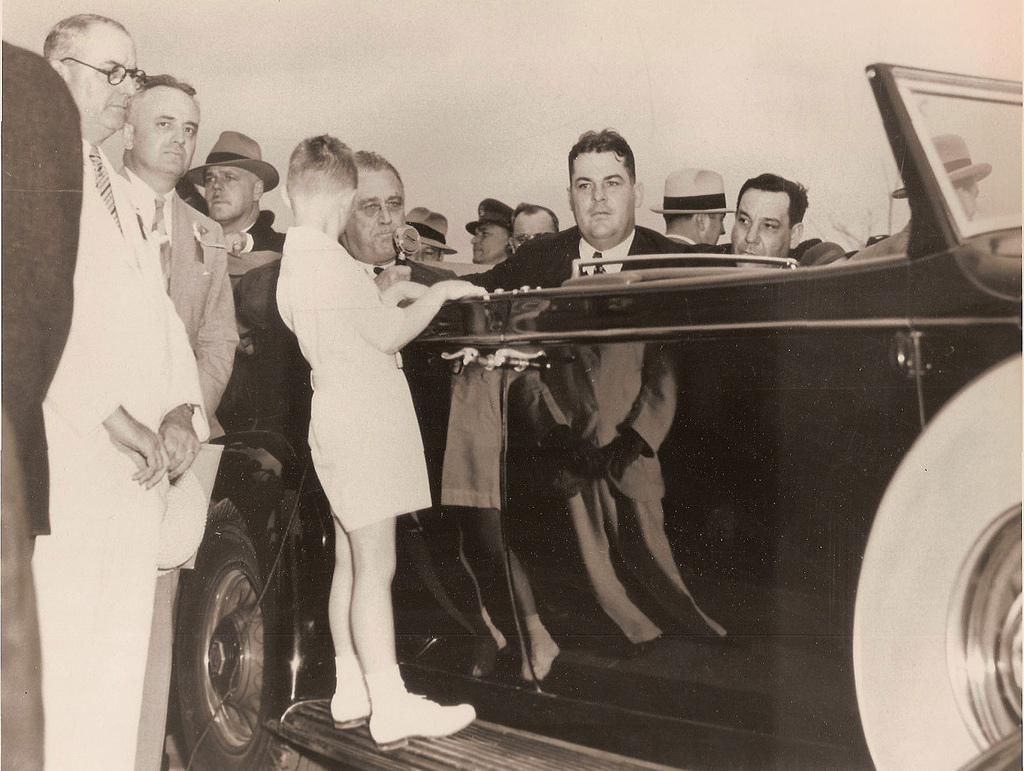
Leche sits beside President Roosevelt at the dedication of improvements in City Park in New Orleans in 1937.

Leche's progressive record, however, was tarnished by corruption, which was to become the major feature of his administration. In a reconciliation with the administration of President Franklin Delano Roosevelt, Leche promised to cease using Long's Share Our Wealth rhetoric and to support New Deal programs. In return, Roosevelt dropped an investigation of the Long machine on tax evasion charges and restored federal patronage to Louisiana. The resulting flow of federal funds, accompanied with widespread graft and corruption, became dubbed the "Second Louisiana Purchase" by contemporaries. While some of the federal funds were from the Public Works Administration to construct new buildings at Louisiana State University and expand New Orleans's Charity Hospital, Leche and his administration took their rapprochement with Roosevelt as free license to steal as much as possible. Once the corruption became too blatant, though, Leche and several of his cronies, including Superintendent of Construction George Caldwell and President James Monroe Smith at LSU, were indicted in what were termed the "Louisiana Scandals" in 1939. Beset by scandal and accusations, Leche resigned the governorship on June 26, 1939; he was succeeded by his lieutenant governor, Earl Kemp Long.

Richard Leche's legal problems began when Chester Martin, a highway engineer who had his pay skimmed by Leche's newspaper, mimeographed receipts of the payments and a written summary of his allegations. He left them on the desks of every state legislator the morning before the legislature came into session. Martin lost his job that day, and no one in the state would hire him until the federal government indicted Leche. Martin used the year to get his law degree from LSU, and practiced law until his retirement.

== Conviction and imprisonment ==
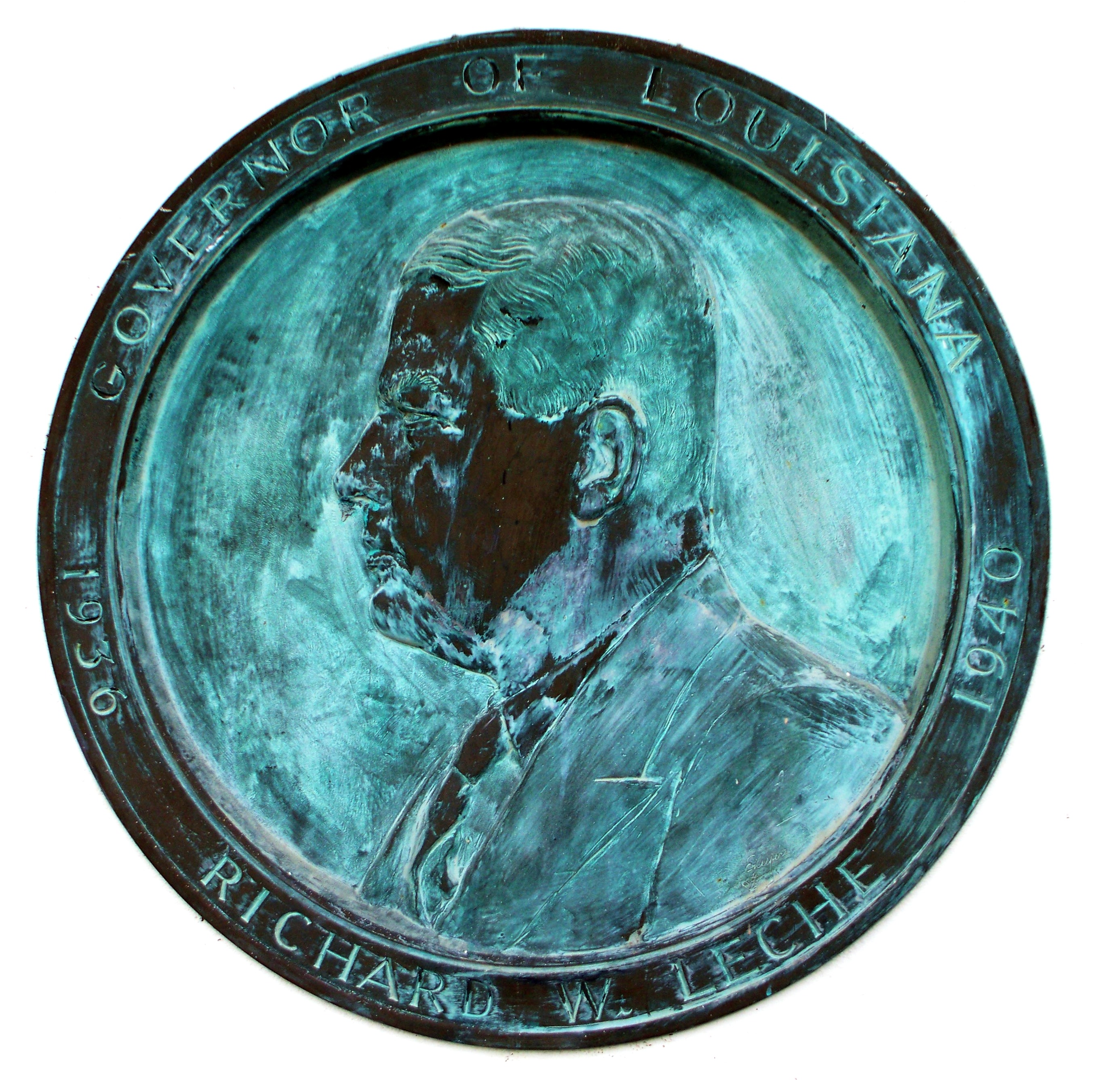
The Richard W. Leche medallion on the east side north end of Strawberry Stadium at Southeastern Louisiana University.

Resignation did not end Leche's legal troubles. In 1940, he was convicted of using the mails to defraud; the particulars involved a scheme to sell trucks to the state highway department. Other charges included the use of stolen WPA resources to build private homes for himself and his allies, making a profit from the sale of "hot oil"—oil produced illegally in excess of state quotas and thus exempt from taxation—and misuse of the funds of Louisiana State University. Huey Long's prediction—"If those fellows ever try to use the powers I've given them without me to hold them down; they'll all land in the penitentiary"—proved prophetic.

== Later years ==
Sentenced to ten years in the United States Penitentiary, Atlanta, Leche was released on parole in 1945. He was pardoned in 1953 by President Harry Truman in one of his final acts before yielding the office to Dwight D. Eisenhower. Leche resumed his law practice in New Orleans and worked until he died in 1965.

== Legacy ==
A large medallion at Southeastern Louisiana University's Strawberry Stadium commemorates the life and career of Richard W. Leche. (The medallion can be viewed on the north exterior end of the east side of the campus football stadium.)

Decades after Leche's conviction, Edwin Edwards was the second governor of Louisiana to be sentenced to prison.

== See also ==
- List of people pardoned or granted clemency by the president of the United States

Party political offices
Preceded by Oscar K. Allen	Democratic nominee for Governor of Louisiana; 1936	Succeeded by Sam H. Jones
Political offices
Preceded by James A. Noe	Governor of Louisiana; May 12, 1936–June 26, 1939	Succeeded by Earl Kemp Long
