= Capitan, Louisiana =

Unincorporated community in Louisiana, U.S.

Coordinates: 30°03′56″N 91°58′57″W

Capitan is an unincorporated community in Lafayette Parish, Louisiana, United States.

The community is located near the intersection of LA Hwy 89 and Piat Road.
