= Rose McConnell Long =

American politician (1892–1970)

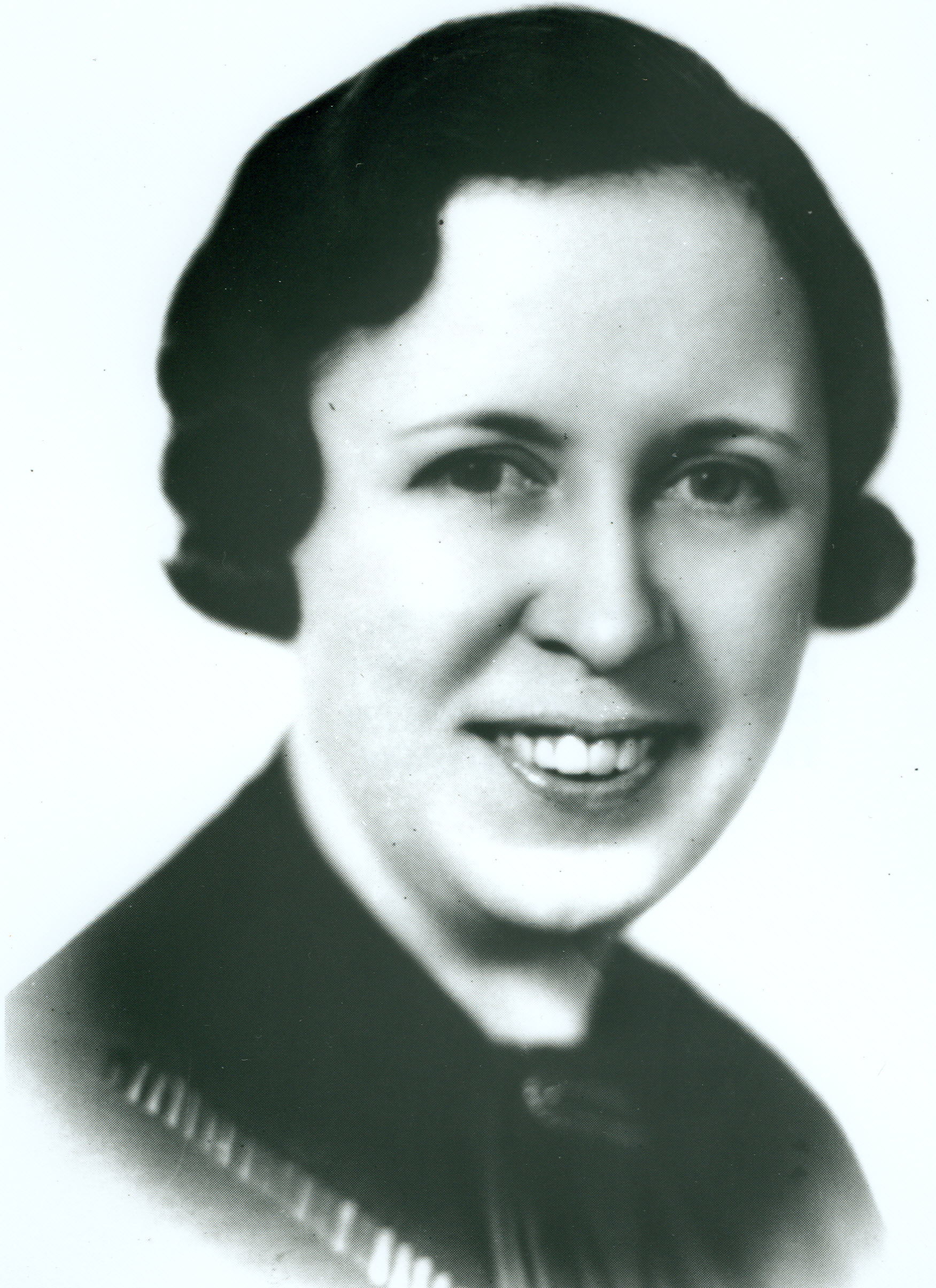

United States Senator from Louisiana
- In office January 31, 1936 – January 3, 1937
- Preceded by: Huey Long
- Succeeded by: Allen J. Ellender

First Lady of Louisiana
- In office May 21, 1928 – January 25, 1932
- Governor: Huey Long
- Preceded by: Elizabeth Fuqua
- Succeeded by: Alice Lee Grosjean

Personal details
- Born: Rose McConnell; April 8, 1892 Greensburg, Indiana, U.S.
- Died: May 27, 1970 (aged 78) Boulder, Colorado, U.S.
- Party: Democratic
- Spouse: Huey Long (m. 1913; died 1935)
- Children: 3, including Russell

Rose McConnell Long (April 8, 1892 – May 27, 1970) was an American politician who served as a U.S. senator from Louisiana, succeeding her late husband Huey Long. She was the third woman to serve as a U.S. senator, and the first from Louisiana.

== Life and work ==
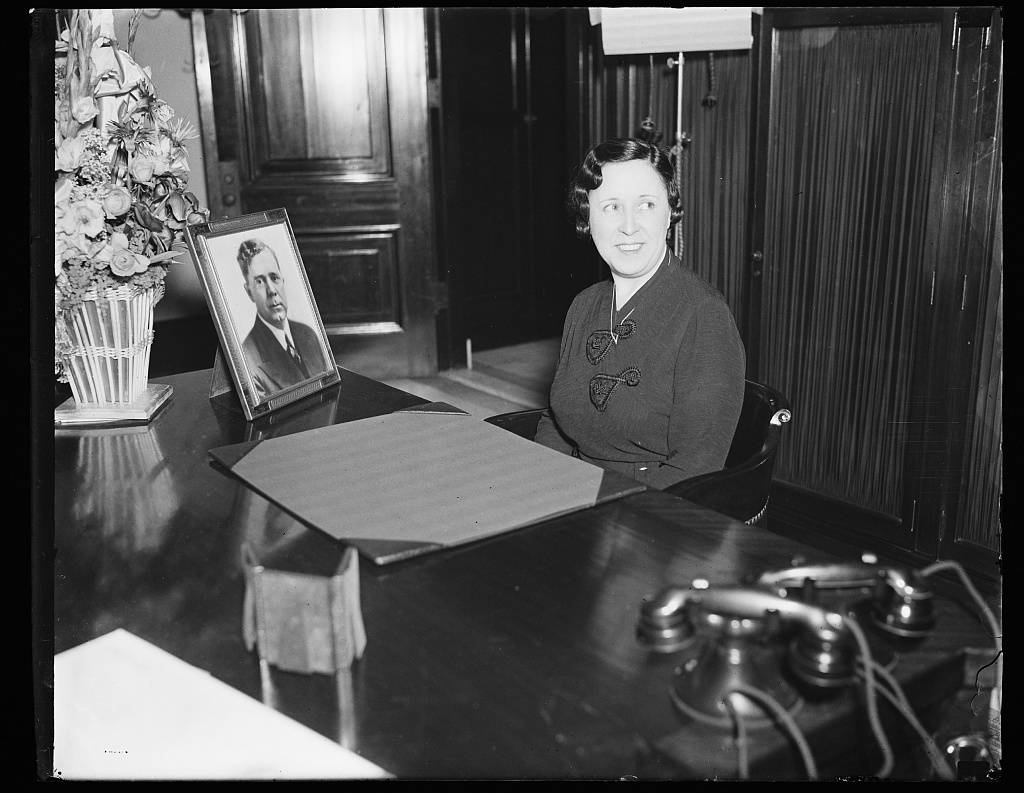
Long in 1936

Rose McConnell was born in Greensburg, Indiana. She met Huey Long after she won a cake-baking contest that he had organized to promote a product that he was selling at the time. After a two-and-a-half-year courtship, Rose and Huey were married in 1913. The next year, he turned to the study of law, and he became a lawyer after passing the bar. They had three children together. Huey Long became a highly successful politician, elected as governor of Louisiana in 1928 and then U.S. senator from Louisiana in 1930.

After Huey's assassination in 1935, in an example of widow's succession, Rose was appointed to serve in his seat in the United States Senate until a special election could be held. She won the special election on April 21, 1936, to serve the remaining months of her husband's term, but she was not a candidate that fall for re-election to a full six-year term. Because Hattie Caraway (D-Arkansas) was already serving in the Senate when Rose Long was elected, it marked the first time that two women had ever served simultaneously in that body.

Rose Long died in Boulder, Colorado, in 1970, where she lived near her daughter, Rose Lolita Long McFarland. She was also survived by her sons, Palmer Reid Long of Shreveport, Louisiana, and Russell B. Long, then the sitting United States Senator from Louisiana.

== Legacy ==
Long was portrayed by Ann Dowd in the 1995 television movie Kingfish: A Story of Huey Long.

On February 1, 2014, Long was posthumously inducted into the Louisiana Political Museum and Hall of Fame in Winnfield. Six others were honored as well, including John S. Hunt II, son of her sister-in-law Lucille Long Hunt, and who had served on the Public Service Commission from 1964 to 1972. Robert "Bob" Mann, press secretary to Senator Russell B. Long, was also inducted.

== See also ==
- Women in the United States Senate

U.S. Senate
Preceded by Huey Long	United States Senator (Class 2) from Louisiana; 1936–1937; Served alongside: John Overton	Succeeded by Allen Ellender
Party political offices
Preceded by Oscar K. Allen	Democratic nominee for U.S. Senator from Louisiana (Class 2); 1936	Succeeded by Allen Ellender
