= James A. Noe =

American politician (1890–1976)

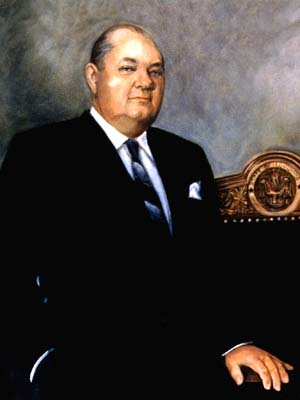

43rd Governor of Louisiana
- In office January 28, 1936 – May 12, 1936
- Lieutenant: Vacant
- Preceded by: Oscar K. Allen
- Succeeded by: Richard W. Leche

37th Lieutenant Governor of Louisiana
- In office 1935–1936
- Governor: Oscar K. Allen
- Preceded by: Thomas C. Wingate
- Succeeded by: Earl K. Long

Member of the Louisiana Senate

Personal details
- Born: James Albert Noe; December 21, 1890 Evans Landing, Indiana, U.S.
- Died: October 18, 1976 (aged 85) Houston, Texas, U.S.
- Resting place: Emma Lee Short Memorial Chapel Mausoleum of Mulhearn Memorial Park Cemetery in Monroe, Louisiana
- Party: Democratic
- Spouse: Anna Gray Sweeney Noe (m. 1922; died 1972)
- Children: Gay Noe; James A. Noe Jr.; Linda McRae Noe
- Education: Public schools
- Profession: Broadcaster; Farmer; Oilman

Military service
- Allegiance: United States
- Branch/service: United States Army
- Rank: First Lieutenant
- Battles/wars: World War I

James Albert Noe Sr. (December 21, 1890 – October 18, 1976) was an American businessman and politician from Louisiana, who was briefly the 43rd governor of Louisiana following the death of Oscar K. Allen in 1936.

Noe was born on December 21, 1890, near West Point, Kentucky. He made his fortune in oil and ran for the Louisiana State Senate at the request of Huey Long. He was chosen as president pro tempore of the senate and succeeded to the governorship to finish out Allen's term, since the lieutenant governor had been elected to the state Supreme Court.

During his brief term in office, he appointed Huey Long's widow, Rose McConnell Long, to fill his seat in the U.S. Senate following his assassination. He also worked on obtaining federal money for state highways and establishing a state welfare office.

Noe ran unsuccessfully for governor in 1940 and 1959 but had more success in his business ventures. Following his governorship, Noe founded KNOE in Monroe, Louisiana as well as the television station of the same name, both named in his honor. He also ran WNOE in New Orleans.

Noe died in Houston, Texas, on October 18, 1976, from complications from a heart condition. His son, James A. Noe Jr., succeeded him in running the family-owned radio and television stations.

== Notes ==
Political offices
Preceded by Thomas C. Wingate	Lieutenant Governor of Louisiana; 1935–1936	Succeeded by Earl K. Long
Preceded by Oscar K. Allen	Governor of Louisiana; January 28, 1936-May 12, 1936	Succeeded by Richard W. Leche
