= Oscar K. Allen =

Governor of Louisiana from 1932 to 1936

Oscar Allen
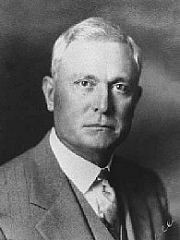

42nd Governor of Louisiana
- In office May 10, 1932 – January 28, 1936
- Lieutenant: John B. Fournet; Thomas Wingate; James A. Noe
- Preceded by: Alvin Olin King
- Succeeded by: James A. Noe

Member of the Louisiana State Senate from Caldwell, Grant, La Salle, and Winn parishes
- In office 1928–1928
- Preceded by: Henry E. Hardtner
- Succeeded by: James Anderson

Personal details
- Born: Oscar Kelly Allen; August 8, 1882 Winn Parish, Louisiana, U.S.
- Died: January 28, 1936 (aged 53) Baton Rouge, Louisiana, U.S.
- Party: Democratic
- Education: Trinity University (BA)

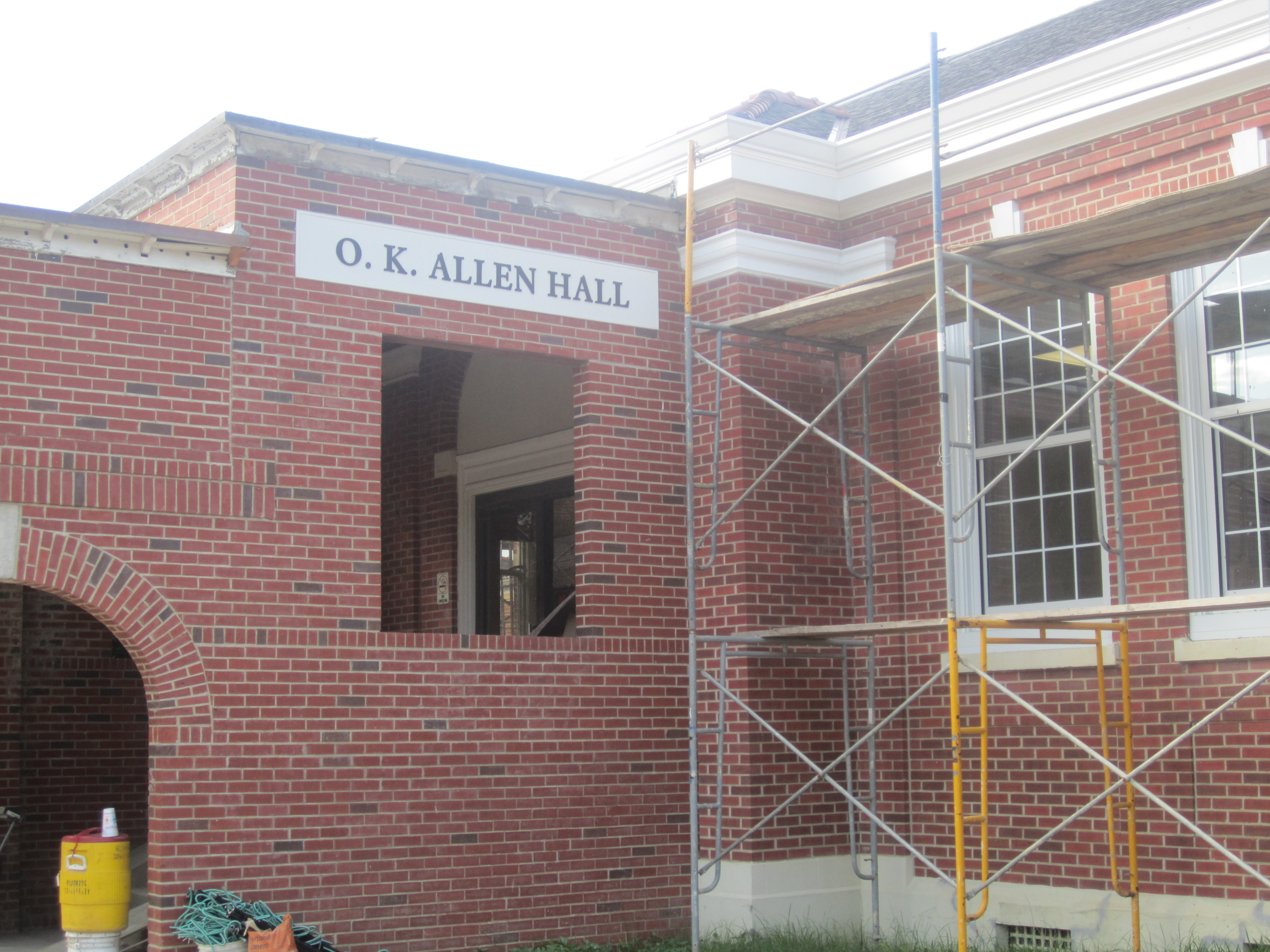
The O.K. Allen Building at the University of Louisiana at Lafayette was renovated in 2011 and now houses the Saucier Wellness Center.

Oscar Kelly Allen Sr. (August 8, 1882 – January 28, 1936), also known as O. K. Allen, was the 42nd governor of Louisiana from 1932 until his death in 1936.

== Career ==
He was elected to the Louisiana state Senate in 1928 in the wake of Huey Long's landslide victory in the gubernatorial election. He defeated the anti-Long incumbent, former Republican Henry E. Hardtner of La Salle Parish. Allen served as Long's floor leader in the Senate; he was also appointed by the governor as chairman of the Louisiana Highway Commission, serving from 1928 until 1930. His appointment was legally challenged. In the litigation that reached the Louisiana Supreme Court, it ruled that holding both legislative and executive positions simultaneously was unconstitutional. Allen resigned as chairman.

Allen was elected governor in the shadow of Huey Long, who had resigned after being elected as US Senator from Louisiana and relocated to Washington, D.C.. Allen was considered a political stooge for former governor Long. His brother Earl Long once joked that a leaf blew into Allen's office one day and that he signed it, thinking it was legislation from Long. During Allen's time as governor, a number of progressive reforms were carried out in areas such as education and working conditions.

The blues musician Lead Belly composed the song "Governor O. K. Allen" as a plea for clemency while he was an inmate at the Louisiana State Penitentiary in 1932. The musicologist John Lomax recorded Lead Belly's song and offered to discuss it with the governor. When Lead Belly was released early he credited the effects of the song.

== Death and honors ==
Allen died in the governor's mansion of a brain hemorrhage. One week before his death, he won the Democratic nomination in the special election to fill the vacancy in the U.S. Senate caused by Huey Long's assassination.

Allen was the namesake of the O.K. Allen Bridge across the Red River between Alexandria and Pineville. The bridge was imploded on September 26, 2015, due to construction on a new bridge to be named the Curtis-Coleman Memorial Bridge.

The former governor is honored, along with his predecessor, by the Huey P. Long–O. K. Allen Bridge, which carries U.S. 190 (Airline Highway) across the Mississippi River in Baton Rouge, as well as the Long-Allen Bridge over the Red River between Shreveport and Bossier City, among others.

Party political offices
Preceded by Huey Long	Democratic nominee for Governor of Louisiana; 1932	Succeeded by Richard W. Leche
Preceded by Huey Long	Democratic nominee for U.S. Senator from Louisiana (Class 2); 1936	Succeeded by Rose McConnell Long
Political offices
Preceded by Alvin Olin King	Governor of Louisiana; May 10, 1932–January 28, 1936	Succeeded by James A. Noe
