= 1986 United States Senate elections =

- November 4, 1986
- Class 3

34 (Note: Including both the concurrent special and regular elections in North Carolina) of the 100 seats in the United States Senate 51 seats needed for a majority
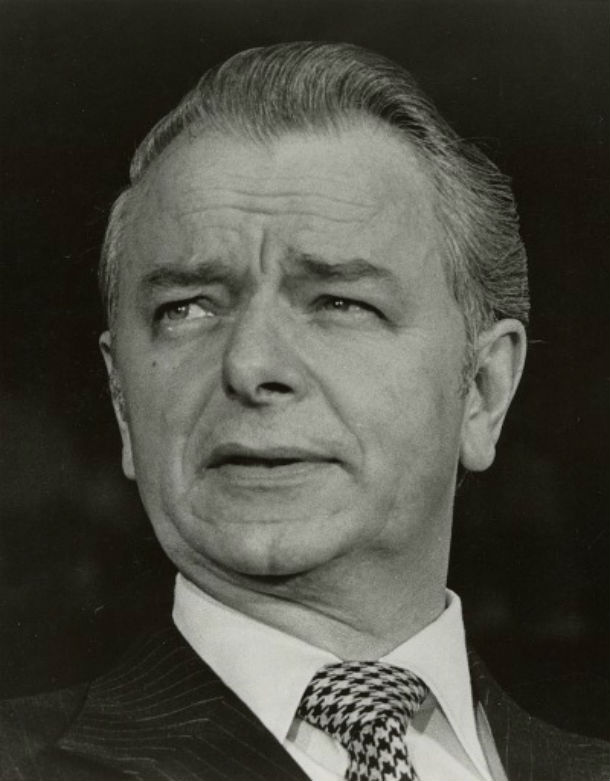

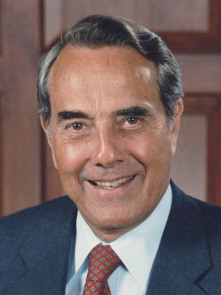
| | Majority party | Minority party |
|---|---|---|
| Leader | Robert Byrd | Bob Dole |
| Party | Democratic | Republican |
| Leader since | January 3, 1977 | January 3, 1985 |
| Leader's seat | West Virginia | Kansas |
| Seats before | 47 | 53 |
| Seats after | 55 | 45 |
| Seat change | ▲8 | ▼8 |
| Popular vote | 24,347,369 | 23,126,219 (Note: The Conservative Party and Right to Life Party in New York endorsed Al D'Amato, but the Clerk of the U.S. House of Representatives did not tabulate their votes, totaling 347,487, into the national Republican total.) |
| Percentage | 50.1% | 47.6% |
| Seats up | 12 | 22 |
| Races won | 20 | 14 |
- Results of the elections: Democratic gain Democratic hold Republican gain Republican hold No election
Majority Leader before election
Bob Dole
Republican
Elected Majority Leader
Robert Byrd
Democratic

The 1986 United States Senate elections were elections for the United States Senate. Held on November 4, in the middle of Ronald Reagan's second presidential term, the 34 seats of Class 3 were contested in regular elections. The Republicans had to defend an unusually large number of freshman Senate incumbents who had been elected on President Ronald Reagan's coattails in 1980. Democrats won a net of eight seats, defeating seven freshman incumbents, picking up two Republican-held open seats, and regaining control of the Senate for the first time since January 1981. This remains the most recent midterm election cycle in which the sitting president's party suffered net losses while still flipping a Senate seat.

Democrats gained a net eight seats, and recaptured control of the Senate from the Republicans with a 55–45 majority. They defeated seven incumbents, all but one of whom had been elected in 1980, and gained open seats held by retiring Republicans in Maryland and Nevada. Republicans gained one open seat in Missouri. Bob Dole (R-Kansas) and Robert Byrd (D-West Virginia) exchanged positions as the Majority Leader and the Minority Leader. However, the Democratic majority would be reduced to 54-46 following the March 1987 death of Democrat Edward Zorinsky, who was then replaced with a Republican.

This was the last election cycle until 2016 in which the Democrats had a net gain in the Class 3 seats. (Note: This does not include special elections held in off-year elections in some states to fill the seats that had been vacated by senators due to death, resignation, or otherwise.)

== Results summary ==
↓
| 55 | 45 |
| Democratic | Republican |

Shading indicates party with largest share of that line.

| Parties | | | | | | Total |
| Parties | Democratic | Republican | Independent | Libertarian | Other | Total |
| Last elections (1984) Before these elections | 47 | 53 | 0 | 0 | 0 | 100 |
| Not up | 35 | 31 | — | — | — | 66 |
| Up Class 3 (1980→1986) | 12 | 22 | — | — | — | 34 |
| Incumbent retired | 3 | 3 | — | — | — | 6 |
| Held by same party | 2 | 1 | — | — | — | 3 |
| Replaced by other party | ▼2 Republicans replaced by ▲2 Democrats ▼1 Democrat replaced by ▲1 Republican | | — | — | — | 3 |
| Result | 4 | 2 | 0 | 0 | 0 | 6 |
| Incumbent ran | 9 | 19 | — | — | — | 28 |
| Won re-election | 9 | 12 | — | — | — | 21 |
| Lost re-election | ▼7 Republicans replaced by ▲7 Democrats | | — | — | — | 7 |
| Lost renomination, but held by same party | 0 | 0 | — | — | — | 0 |
| Result | 16 | 12 | 0 | 0 | 0 | 28 |
| Total elected | 20 | 14 | 0 | 0 | 0 | 34 |
| Net gain/loss | ▲8 | ▼8 | Steady | Steady | Steady | 8 |
| Nationwide vote | 24,347,369 | 23,126,219 | 155,032 | 104,338 | 878,047 | 48,611,005 |
| Share | 50.09% | 47.57% | 0.32% | 0.21% | 1.81% | 100% |
| Result | 55 | 45 | 0 | 0 | 0 | 100 |

Source: Office of the Clerk

== Gains, losses, and holds ==
=== Retirements ===
Map of retirements: Republican incumbent Democratic incumbent Democratic incumbent retired Republican incumbent retired

Three Republicans and three Democrats retired instead of seeking re-election.

| State | Senator | Age at end of term | Assumed office | Replaced by |
|---|---|---|---|---|
| Arizona | Barry Goldwater | 78 | 1969 (Note: Goldwater previously served as a Senator from 1953 to 1965.) | John McCain |
| Colorado | Gary Hart | 50 | 1975 | Tim Wirth |
| Louisiana | Russell B. Long | 68 | 1948 (Note: Elected in the special election to finish John Holmes Overton's term.) | John Breaux |
| Maryland | Charles Mathias | 64 | 1969 | Barbara Mikulski |
| Missouri | Thomas Eagleton | 57 | 1968 | Kit Bond |
| Nevada | Paul Laxalt | 64 | 1974 | Harry Reid |

=== Defeats ===
Seven Republicans sought re-election but lost in the general election, including one that simultaneously lost in a special election.

| State | Senator | Assumed office | Replaced by |
|---|---|---|---|
| Alabama | Jeremiah Denton | 1981 | Richard Shelby |
| Florida | Paula Hawkins | 1981 | Bob Graham |
| Georgia | Mack Mattingly | 1981 | Wyche Fowler |
| North Carolina | Jim Broyhill | 1986 (Note: Appointed to the seat following the death of John P. East.) | Terry Sanford |
| North Dakota | Mark Andrews | 1981 | Kent Conrad |
| South Dakota | James Abdnor | 1981 | Tom Daschle |
| Washington | Slade Gorton | 1981 | Brock Adams |

=== Post-election changes ===
One Democrat died on March 6, 1987, and a Republican was appointed on March 11, 1987.

| State | Senator | Replaced by |
|---|---|---|
| Nebraska (Class 1) | Edward Zorinsky | David Karnes |

== Change in composition ==
=== Before the elections ===
| D_{1} | D_{2} | D_{3} | D_{4} | D_{5} | D_{6} | D_{7} | D_{8} | D_{9} | D_{10} |
| D_{20} | D_{19} | D_{18} | D_{17} | D_{16} | D_{15} | D_{14} | D_{13} | D_{12} | D_{11} |
| D_{21} | D_{22} | D_{23} | D_{24} | D_{25} | D_{26} | D_{27} | D_{28} | D_{29} | D_{30} |
| D_{40} Hawaii; Ran | D_{39} Conn. Ran | D_{38} Colo. Retired | D_{37} Calif. Ran | D_{36} Ark. Ran | D_{35} | D_{34} | D_{33} | D_{32} | D_{31} |
| D_{41} Ill. Ran | D_{42} Ky. Ran | D_{43} La. Retired | D_{44} Mo. Retired | D_{45} Ohio; Ran | D_{46} S.C. Ran | D_{47} Vt. Ran | R_{53} Wisc. Ran | R_{52} Wash. Ran | R_{51} Utah; Ran |
| Majority → | | | | | | | | | R_{51} Utah; Ran |
| R_{41} Md. Retired | R_{42} Nev. Retired | R_{43} N.H. Ran | R_{44} N.Y. Ran | R_{45} N.C. (reg) & N.C. (sp); Ran | R_{46} N.D. Ran | R_{47} Okla. Ran | R_{48} Ore. Ran | R_{49} Pa. Ran | R_{50} S.D. Ran |
| R_{40} Kan. Ran | R_{39} Iowa; Ran | R_{38} Ind. Ran | R_{37} Idaho; Ran | R_{36} Ga. Ran | R_{35} Fla. Ran | R_{34} Ariz. Retired | R_{33} Alaska; Ran | R_{32} Ala. Ran | R_{31} |
| R_{21} | R_{22} | R_{23} | R_{24} | R_{25} | R_{26} | R_{27} | R_{28} | R_{29} | R_{30} |
| R_{20} | R_{19} | R_{18} | R_{17} | R_{16} | R_{15} | R_{14} | R_{13} | R_{12} | R_{11} |
| R_{1} | R_{2} | R_{3} | R_{4} | R_{5} | R_{6} | R_{7} | R_{8} | R_{9} | R_{10} |

=== After the elections ===
| D_{1} | D_{2} | D_{3} | D_{4} | D_{5} | D_{6} | D_{7} | D_{8} | D_{9} | D_{10} |
| D_{20} | D_{19} | D_{18} | D_{17} | D_{16} | D_{15} | D_{14} | D_{13} | D_{12} | D_{11} |
| D_{21} | D_{22} | D_{23} | D_{24} | D_{25} | D_{26} | D_{27} | D_{28} | D_{29} | D_{30} |
| D_{40} Hawaii; Re-elected | D_{39} Conn. Re-elected | D_{38} Colo. Hold | D_{37} Calif. Re-elected | D_{36} Ark. Re-elected | D_{35} | D_{34} | D_{33} | D_{32} | D_{31} |
| D_{41} Ill. Re-elected | D_{42} Ky. Re-elected | D_{43} La. Hold | D_{44} Ohio; Re-elected | D_{45} S.C. Re-elected | D_{46} Vt. Re-elected | D_{47} Ala. Gain | D_{48} Fla. Gain | D_{49} Ga. Gain | D_{50} Md. Gain |
| Majority → | | | | | | | | | D_{51} Nev. Gain |
| R_{41} Ore. Re-elected | R_{42} Pa. Re-elected | R_{43} Utah; Re-elected | R_{44} Wisc. Re-elected | R_{45} Mo. Gain | D_{55} Wash. Gain | D_{54} S.D. Gain | D_{53} N.D. Gain | D_{52} N.C. (reg) & N.C. (sp); Gain (Note: Appointee defeated) | D_{51} Nev. Gain |
| R_{40} Okla. Re-elected | R_{39} N.Y. Re-elected | R_{38} N.H. Re-elected | R_{37} Kan. Re-elected | R_{36} Iowa; Re-elected | R_{35} Ind. Re-elected | R_{34} Idaho; Re-elected | R_{33} Ariz. Hold | R_{32} Alaska; Re-elected | R_{31} |
| R_{21} | R_{22} | R_{23} | R_{24} | R_{25} | R_{26} | R_{27} | R_{28} | R_{29} | R_{30} |
| R_{20} | R_{19} | R_{18} | R_{17} | R_{16} | R_{15} | R_{14} | R_{13} | R_{12} | R_{11} |
| R_{1} | R_{2} | R_{3} | R_{4} | R_{5} | R_{6} | R_{7} | R_{8} | R_{9} | R_{10} |

=== Beginning of the first session ===
| D_{1} | D_{2} | D_{3} | D_{4} | D_{5} | D_{6} | D_{7} | D_{8} | D_{9} | D_{10} |
| D_{20} | D_{19} | D_{18} | D_{17} | D_{16} | D_{15} | D_{14} | D_{13} | D_{12} | D_{11} |
| D_{21} | D_{22} | D_{23} | D_{24} | D_{25} | D_{26} | D_{27} | D_{28} | D_{29} | D_{30} |
| D_{40} | D_{39} | D_{38} | D_{37} | D_{36} | D_{35} | D_{34} | D_{33} | D_{32} | D_{31} |
| D_{41} | D_{42} | D_{43} | D_{44} | D_{45} | D_{46} | D_{47} | D_{48} | D_{49} | D_{50} |
| Majority → | | | | | | | | | D_{51} |
| R_{41} | R_{42} | R_{43} | R_{44} | R_{45} | R_{46} Neb. Gain | D_{54} | D_{53} | D_{52} | D_{51} |
| R_{40} | R_{39} | R_{38} | R_{37} | R_{36} | R_{35} | R_{34} | R_{33} | R_{32} | R_{31} |
| R_{21} | R_{22} | R_{23} | R_{24} | R_{25} | R_{26} | R_{27} | R_{28} | R_{29} | R_{30} |
| R_{20} | R_{19} | R_{18} | R_{17} | R_{16} | R_{15} | R_{14} | R_{13} | R_{12} | R_{11} |
| R_{1} | R_{2} | R_{3} | R_{4} | R_{5} | R_{6} | R_{7} | R_{8} | R_{9} | R_{10} |

| Key | D_{#} / Democratic; R_{#} / Republican |

== Race summary ==
=== Special election ===
In this special election, the winner was seated during 1986.

| State | Incumbent | | | Result | Candidates |
| State | Senator | Party | Electoral history | Result | Candidates |
|---|---|---|---|---|---|
| North Carolina (Class 3) | Jim Broyhill | Republican | 1986 (appointed) | Interim appointee lost election to finish term. New senator elected November 8, 1986. Democratic gain. Winner also elected to the next term; see below. | ▌ ✓ Terry Sanford (Democratic) 50.9%; ▌Jim Broyhill (Republican) 49.1% |

=== Elections leading to the next Congress ===
In these general elections, the winners were elected for the term beginning January 3, 1987; ordered by state.

All of the elections involved the Class 3 seats.

| State | Incumbent | | | Result | Candidates |
| State | Senator | Party | Electoral history | Result | Candidates |
|---|---|---|---|---|---|
| Alabama | Jeremiah Denton | Republican | 1980 | Incumbent lost re-election. Democratic gain. | ▌ ✓ Richard Shelby (Democratic) 50.3%; ▌Jeremiah Denton (Republican) 49.7% |
| Alaska | Frank Murkowski | Republican | 1980 | Incumbent re-elected. | ▌ ✓ Frank Murkowski (Republican) 54.0%; ▌Glenn Olds (Democratic) 44.1%; ▌Chuck House (Libertarian) 1.7% |
| Arizona | Barry Goldwater | Republican | 1952; 1958; 1964 (retired); 1968; 1974; 1980 | Incumbent retired. Republican hold. | ▌ ✓ John McCain (Republican) 60.6%; ▌Richard Kimball (Democratic) 39.4% |
| Arkansas | Dale Bumpers | Democratic | 1974; 1980 | Incumbent re-elected. | ▌ ✓ Dale Bumpers (Democratic) 62.9%; ▌Asa Hutchinson (Republican) 37.1% |
| California | Alan Cranston | Democratic | 1968; 1974; 1980 | Incumbent re-elected. | ▌ ✓ Alan Cranston (Democratic) 49.3%; ▌Ed Zschau (Republican) 47.8%; Others: ▌Breck McKinley (Libertarian) 1.5%; ▌Edward B. Vallen (American Independent) 0.9%; ▌Andrew R. Kangas (Peace and Freedom) 0.5% |
| Colorado | Gary Hart | Democratic | 1974; 1980 | Incumbent retired. Democratic hold. | ▌ ✓ Tim Wirth (Democratic) 49.9%; ▌Ken Kramer (Republican) 48.4%; Others: ▌Michael Bush (Independent) 1.0%; ▌Michael Chamberlain (Socialist Workers) 0.4%; ▌Henry Olshaw (Unaffiliated American) 0.2%; ▌Calvin Dodge (Prohibition) 0.1% |
| Connecticut | Chris Dodd | Democratic | 1980 | Incumbent re-elected. | ▌ ✓ Chris Dodd (Democratic) 64.8%; ▌Roger W. Eddy (Republican) 34.8%; ▌Edward McCallum (Independent) 0.4% |
| Florida | Paula Hawkins | Republican | 1980 | Incumbent lost re-election. Democratic gain. | ▌ ✓ Bob Graham (Democratic) 54.7%; ▌Paula Hawkins (Republican) 45.3% |
| Georgia | Mack Mattingly | Republican | 1980 | Incumbent lost re-election. Democratic gain. | ▌ ✓ Wyche Fowler (Democratic) 50.9%; ▌Mack Mattingly (Republican) 49.1% |
| Hawaii | Daniel Inouye | Democratic | 1962; 1968; 1974; 1980 | Incumbent re-elected. | ▌ ✓ Daniel Inouye (Democratic) 73.6%; ▌Frank Hutchinson (Republican) 26.4% |
| Idaho | Steve Symms | Republican | 1980 | Incumbent re-elected. | ▌ ✓ Steve Symms (Republican) 51.4%; ▌John V. Evans (Democratic) 48.6% |
| Illinois | Alan J. Dixon | Democratic | 1980 | Incumbent re-elected. | ▌ ✓ Alan J. Dixon (Democratic) 65.4%; ▌Judy Koehler (Republican) 34.1% |
| Indiana | Dan Quayle | Republican | 1980 | Incumbent re-elected. | ▌ ✓ Dan Quayle (Republican) 61.1%; ▌Jill L. Long (Democratic) 38.9% |
| Iowa | Chuck Grassley | Republican | 1980 | Incumbent re-elected. | ▌ ✓ Chuck Grassley (Republican) 66.0%; ▌John P. Roehrick (Democratic) 34.0% |
| Kansas | Bob Dole | Republican | 1968; 1974; 1980 | Incumbent re-elected. | ▌ ✓ Bob Dole (Republican) 70.1%; ▌Guy MacDonald (Democratic) 29.9% |
| Kentucky | Wendell Ford | Democratic | 1974; 1980 | Incumbent re-elected. | ▌ ✓ Wendell Ford (Democratic) 74.3%; ▌Jackson M. Andrews (Republican) 25.7% |
| Louisiana | Russell B. Long | Democratic | 1948 (special); 1950; 1956; 1962; 1968; 1974; 1980 | Incumbent retired. Democratic hold. | ▌ ✓ John Breaux (Democratic) 52.8%; ▌Henson Moore (Republican) 47.2% |
| Maryland | Charles Mathias | Republican | 1968; 1974; 1980 | Incumbent retired. Democratic gain. | ▌ ✓ Barbara Mikulski (Democratic) 60.8%; ▌Linda Chavez (Republican) 39.2% |
| Missouri | Thomas Eagleton | Democratic | 1968; 1974; 1980 | Incumbent retired. Republican gain. | ▌ ✓ Kit Bond (Republican) 52.6%; ▌Harriett Woods (Democratic) 47.4% |
| Nevada | Paul Laxalt | Republican | 1974; 1980 | Incumbent retired. Democratic gain. | ▌ ✓ Harry Reid (Democratic) 50.0%; ▌James David Santini (Republican) 44.5%; ▌Kent Cromwell (Libertarian) 1.9% |
| New Hampshire | Warren Rudman | Republican | 1980 | Incumbent re-elected. | ▌ ✓ Warren Rudman (Republican) 62.9%; ▌Endicott Peabody (Democratic) 32.4%; ▌Gruce Valley (Independent) 4.7% |
| New York | Al D'Amato | Republican | 1980 | Incumbent re-elected. | ▌ ✓ Al D'Amato (Republican) 57.7%; ▌Mark Green (Democratic) 40.9%; Others: ▌John S. Dyson (Liberal) 1.4%; ▌Fred Newman (New Alliance) 0.3%; ▌Michael Shur (Socialist Workers) 0.2% |
| North Carolina | Jim Broyhill | Republican | 1986 (appointed) | Interim appointee lost election. Democratic gain. Winner was also elected to finish the current term; see above. | ▌ ✓ Terry Sanford (Democratic) 51.8%; ▌Jim Broyhill (Republican) 48.2% |
| North Dakota | Mark Andrews | Republican | 1980 | Incumbent lost re-election. Democratic-NPL gain. | ▌ ✓ Kent Conrad (Democratic-NPL) 49.8%; ▌Mark Andrews (Republican) 49.0% |
| Ohio | John Glenn | Democratic | 1974; 1974 (appointed); 1980 | Incumbent re-elected. | ▌ ✓ John Glenn (Democratic) 62.4%; ▌Tom Kindness (Republican) 37.6% |
| Oklahoma | Don Nickles | Republican | 1980 | Incumbent re-elected. | ▌ ✓ Don Nickles (Republican) 54.5%; ▌James R. Jones (Democratic) 45.5% |
| Oregon | Bob Packwood | Republican | 1968; 1974; 1980 | Incumbent re-elected. | ▌ ✓ Bob Packwood (Republican) 63.5%; ▌Rick Bauman (Democratic) 36.5% |
| Pennsylvania | Arlen Specter | Republican | 1980 | Incumbent re-elected. | ▌ ✓ Arlen Specter (Republican) 56.9%; ▌Robert W. Edgar (Democratic) 43.1% |
| South Carolina | Fritz Hollings | Democratic | 1966 (special); 1968; 1974; 1980 | Incumbent re-elected. | ▌ ✓ Fritz Hollings (Democratic) 63.9%; ▌Henry McMaster (Republican) 36.1% |
| South Dakota | James Abdnor | Republican | 1980 | Incumbent lost re-election. Democratic gain. | ▌ ✓ Tom Daschle (Democratic) 51.6%; ▌James Abdnor (Republican) 48.4% |
| Utah | Jake Garn | Republican | 1974; 1980 | Incumbent re-elected. | ▌ ✓ Jake Garn (Republican) 72.3%; ▌Craig Oliver (Democratic) 26.6%; Others: ▌Hugh A. Butler (Libertarian) 0.7%; ▌Mary Zins (Independent) 0.4% |
| Vermont | Patrick Leahy | Democratic | 1974; 1980 | Incumbent re-elected. | ▌ ✓ Patrick Leahy (Democratic) 63.7%; ▌Richard A. Snelling (Republican) 34.7% |
| Washington | Slade Gorton | Republican | 1980 | Incumbent lost re-election. Democratic gain. | ▌ ✓ Brock Adams (Democratic) 50.6%; ▌Slade Gorton (Republican) 48.7%; ▌Jill Fein (Socialist Workers) 0.7% |
| Wisconsin | Bob Kasten | Republican | 1980 | Incumbent re-elected. | ▌ ✓ Bob Kasten (Republican) 51.8%; ▌Ed Garvey (Democratic) 48.2% |

== Closest races ==
In sixteen races the margin of victory was under 10%.

| State | Party of winner | Margin |
|---|---|---|
| Alabama | Democratic (flip) | 0.56% |
| North Dakota | Democratic (flip) | 0.73% |
| California | Democratic | 1.42% |
| Colorado | Democratic | 1.55% |
| North Carolina (special) | Democratic (flip) | 1.76% |
| Georgia | Democratic (flip) | 1.83% (Note: Georgia was the "tipping-point state".) |
| Washington | Democratic (flip) | 1.99% |
| Idaho | Republican | 3.11% |
| South Dakota | Democratic (flip) | 3.21% |
| North Carolina (regular) | Democratic (flip) | 3.54% |
| Wisconsin | Republican | 3.54% |
| Missouri | Republican (flip) | 5.28% |
| Nevada | Democratic (flip) | 5.48% |
| Louisiana | Democratic | 5.64% |
| Florida | Democratic (flip) | 9.48% |
| Alaska | Republican | 9.93% |

== Alabama ==
Alabama election
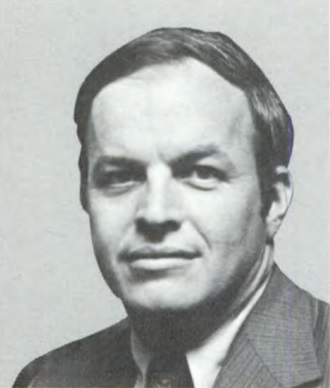

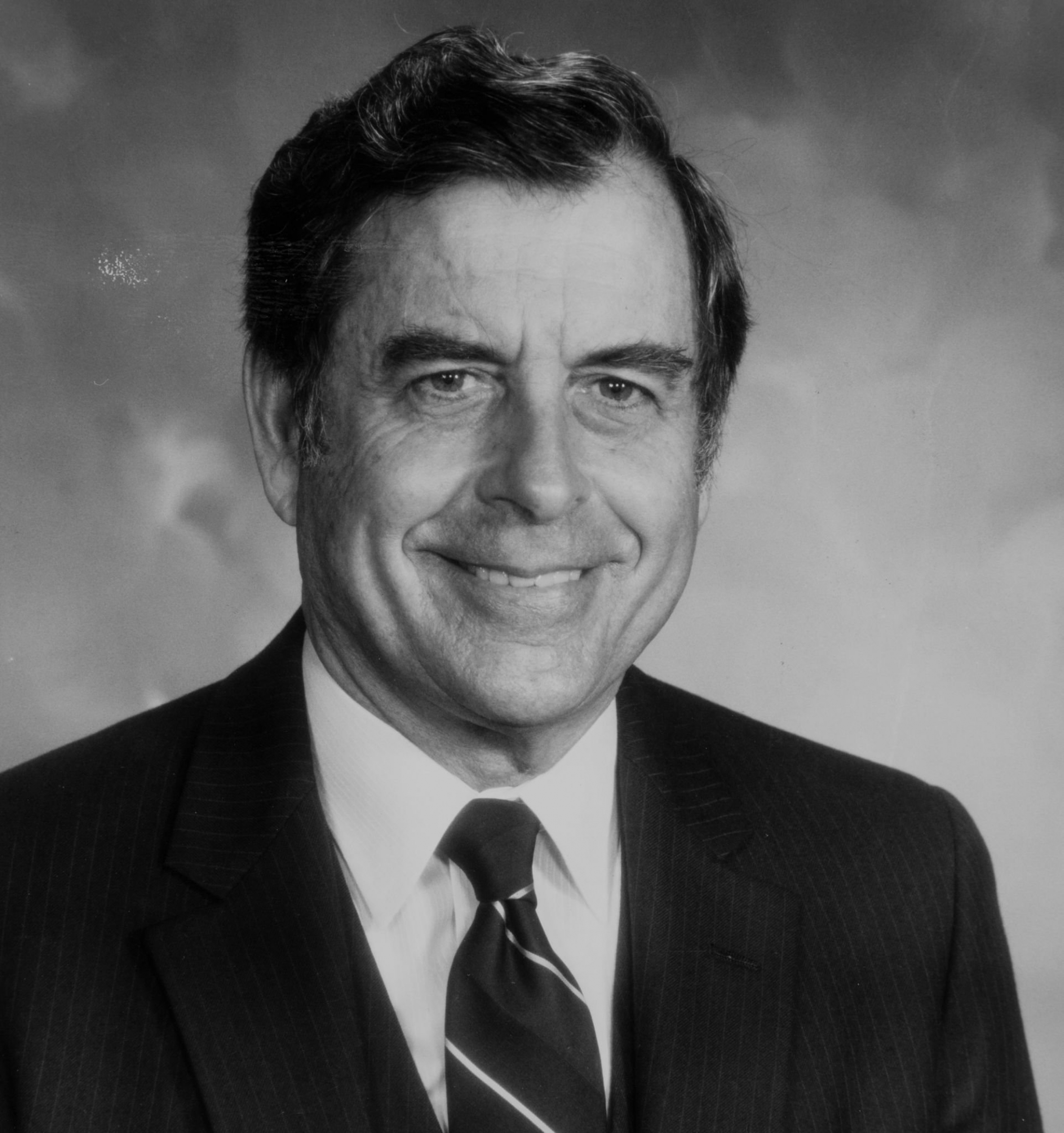
| Nominee | Richard Shelby | Jeremiah Denton |
| Party | Democratic | Republican |
| Popular vote | 609,360 | 602,537 |
| Percentage | 50.3% | 49.7% |
- County results Shelby: 50–60% 60–70% 70–80% 80–90% Denton: 50–60% 60–70% 70–80%
U.S. senator before election
Jeremiah Denton
Republican
Elected U.S. Senator
Richard Shelby
Democratic

Incumbent Republican Jeremiah Denton ran for a second term but lost to Democrat Richard Shelby.

Shelby, a moderate-to-conservative Democrat avoided a primary runoff and won nomination in the Democratic Party primary over Jim Allen Jr., son of former senator James Allen.

Democratic primary results
| Party | Candidate | Votes | % |
|---|---|---|---|
| Democratic | Richard Shelby | 420,155 | 51.33% |
| Democratic | Jim Allen Jr. | 284,206 | 34.72% |
| Democratic | Ted McLaughlin | 70,784 | 8.65% |
| Democratic | Margaret Stewart | 26,723 | 3.27% |
| Democratic | Steve Arnold | 16,722 | 2.04% |
| Total votes | | 818,590 | 100.00% |

Incumbent Senator Jeremiah Denton, a retired Rear Admiral and decorated Vietnam War veteran who six years earlier became the first Republican elected to the Senate from Alabama since Reconstruction, won the Republican primary with little opposition from Richard Vickers.

Republican primary results
| Party | Candidate | Votes | % |
|---|---|---|---|
| Republican | Jeremiah Denton | 29,805 | 88.55% |
| Republican | Richard Vickers | 3,854 | 11.45% |
| Total votes | | 33,659 | 100.00% |

Shelby won a very narrow victory over Denton (less than one percent), once again making Alabama's Senate delegation entirely Democratic.

1986 United States Senate election in Alabama
| Party | Candidate | Votes | % | ±% |
|---|---|---|---|---|
| Democratic | Richard Shelby | 609,360 | 50.28% | |
| Republican | Jeremiah Denton (Incumbent) | 602,537 | 49.72% | |
| Majority | | 6,823 | 0.56% | |
| Turnout | | 1,211,897 | | |
| Democratic gain from Republican | | Swing | | |

== Alaska ==
Alaska election
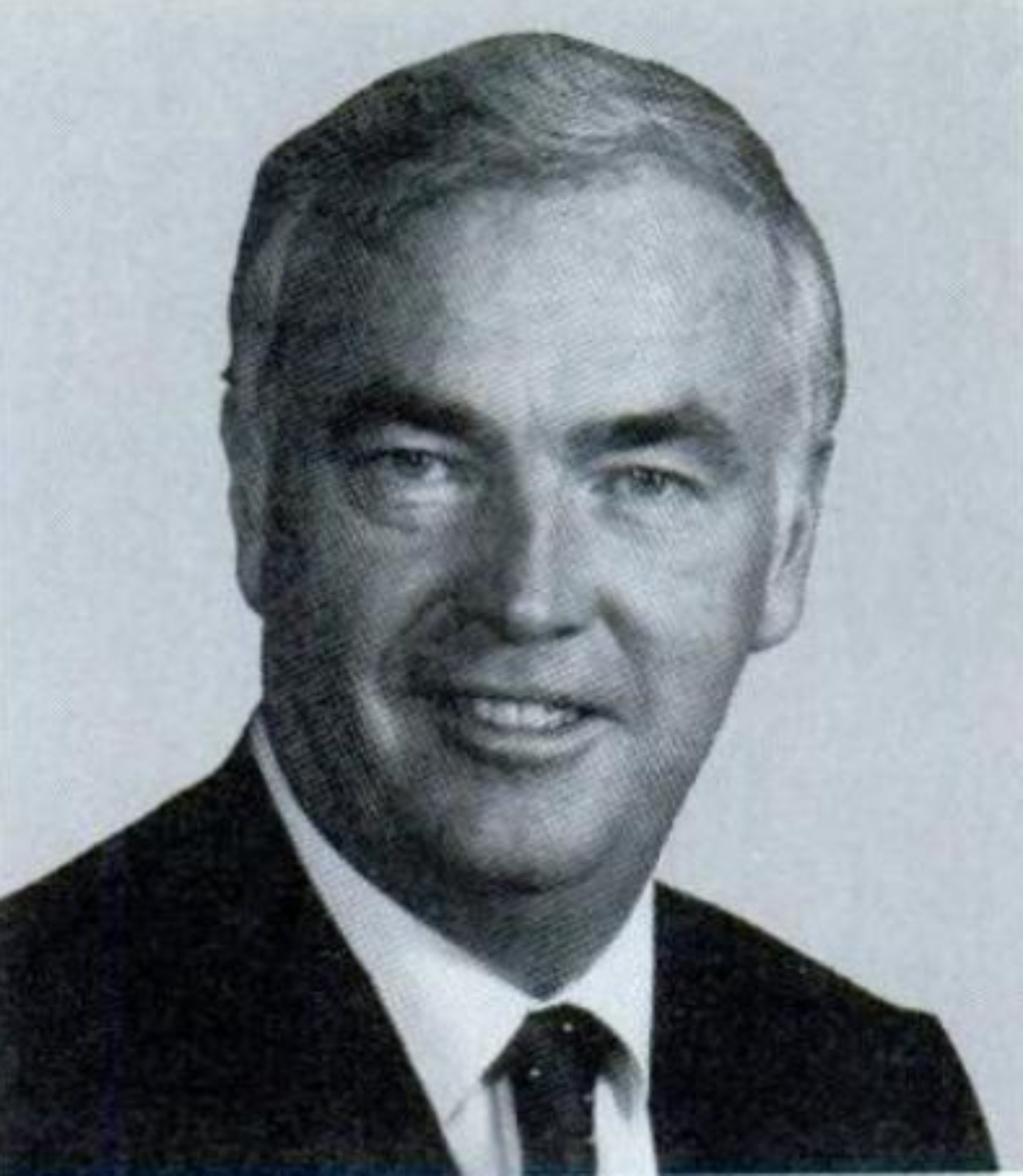

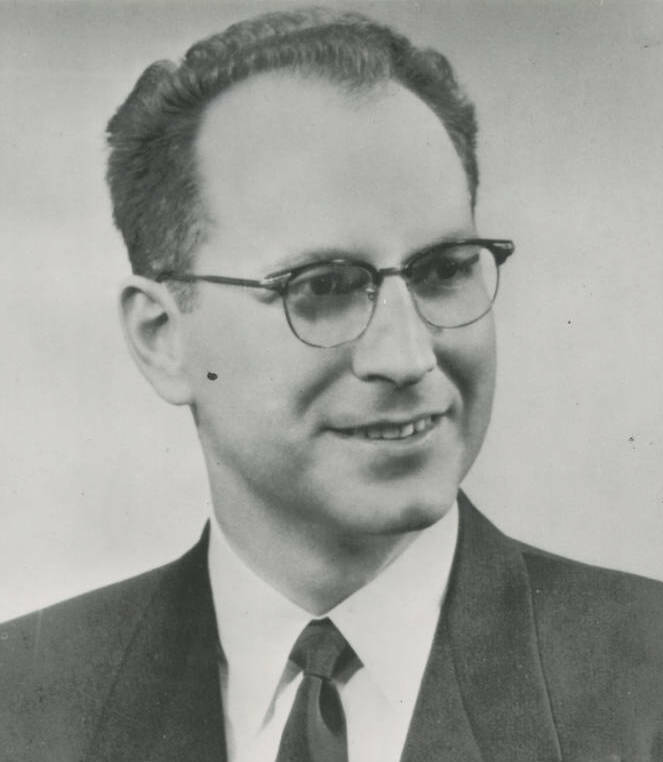
| Nominee | Frank Murkowski | Glenn Olds |
| Party | Republican | Democratic |
| Popular vote | 97,764 | 79,727 |
| Percentage | 54.02% | 44.10% |
- Results by state house district Murkowski: 40–50% 50–60% 60–70% Olds: 40–50% 50–60%
U.S. senator before election
Frank Murkowski
Republican
Elected U.S. Senator
Frank Murkowski
Republican

Incumbent Republican Frank Murkowski ran for a second term and was primarily opposed by Democrat and Alaska Pacific University President Glenn Olds and Libertarian Chuck House, field representative for Eastman Kodak Company. Following a highly competitive election in 1980, Murkowski faced a legitimate opponent in Olds, and the contest was fairly close throughout the campaign. However, in the end, Murkowski was able to defeat Olds 63%-25% in the open primary. He won 54%-44% against Olds in the runoff.

Open primary results
| Party | Candidate | Votes | % |
|---|---|---|---|
| Republican | Frank Murkowski (inc.) | 91,705 | 63.11% |
| Democratic | Glenn Olds | 36,995 | 25.46% |
| Democratic | Bill Barnes | 4,871 | 3.35% |
| Libertarian | Chuck House | 4,265 | 2.94% |
| Democratic | Dave J. Carlson | 4,211 | 2.90% |
| Democratic | Michael J. Bruner | 1,809 | 1.24% |
| Democratic | Karl Francis | 1,454 | 1.00% |
| Total votes | | 145,310 | 100.00% |

1986 United States Senate election in Alaska
| Party | Candidate | Votes | % | ±% |
|---|---|---|---|---|
| Republican | Frank Murkowski (Incumbent) | 97,674 | 54.02% | +0.34% |
| Democratic | Glenn Olds | 79,727 | 44.10% | −1.84% |
| Libertarian | Chuck House | 3,161 | 1.75% | |
| Write-ins | | 239 | 0.13% | |
| Majority | | 17,947 | 9.93% | +2.17% |
| Turnout | | 180,801 | 100.0 | |
| Republican hold | | Swing | | |

== Arizona ==
Arizona election
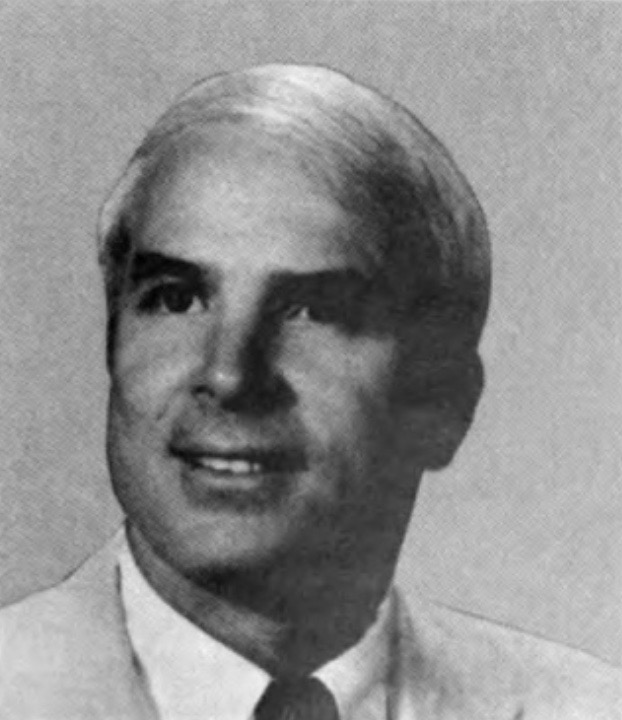

| Nominee | John McCain | Richard Kimball |
| Party | Republican | Democratic |
| Popular vote | 521,850 | 340,965 |
| Percentage | 60.4% | 39.5% |
- County results McCain: 50–60% 60-70% Kimball: 50–60%
U.S. senator before election
Barry Goldwater
Republican
Elected U.S. Senator
John McCain
Republican

Incumbent Republican Barry Goldwater decided to retire instead of seeking a sixth term. The open seat was won by Republican John McCain, a Congressman and former Navy Officer who beat Democratic State Legislator Richard Kimball. Both candidates were unopposed in their respective primaries.

Kimball's campaign was subject to negative press from the Arizona Republic and Phoenix Gazette. One Gazette columnist described him as displaying "terminal weirdness." McCain ultimately won the election by a margin of 20%, and he would go on to win six more terms to the U.S. Senate.

General election results
| Party | Candidate | Votes | % | ±% |
|---|---|---|---|---|
| Republican | John McCain | 521,850 | 60.47% | +11.02% |
| Democratic | Richard Kimball | 340,965 | 39.51% | −8.87% |
| Write-ins | | 106 | 0.01% | |
| Majority | | 180,885 | 20.96% | +19.89% |
| Turnout | | 862,921 | | |
| Republican hold | | Swing | | |

== Arkansas ==
Arkansas election
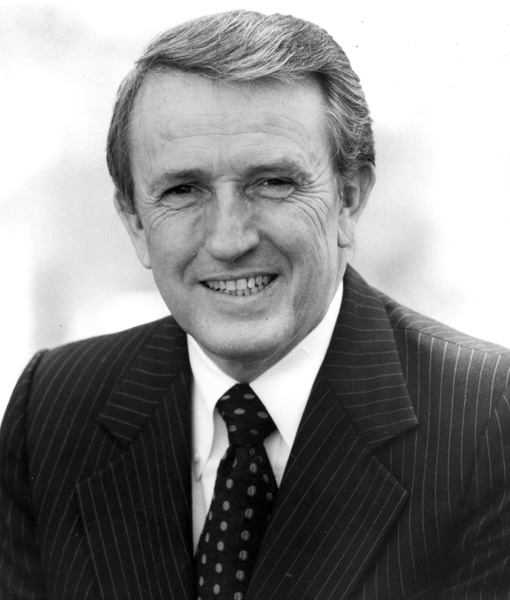

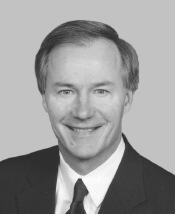
| Nominee | Dale Bumpers | Asa Hutchinson |
| Party | Democratic | Republican |
| Popular vote | 433,122 | 262,313 |
| Percentage | 62.3% | 37.7% |
- County results Bumpers: 50–60% 60–70% 70–80% 80–90% Hutchinson: 50–60%
U.S. senator before election
Dale Bumpers
Democratic
Elected U.S. Senator
Dale Bumpers
Democratic

Incumbent Democrat Dale Bumpers won re-election to a third term over Republican U.S. Attorney Asa Hutchinson. Both ran unopposed in their respective primaries.

Arkansas Senate election 1986
| Party | Candidate | Votes | % |
|---|---|---|---|
| Democratic | Dale Bumpers (Incumbent) | 433,122 | 62.3% |
| Republican | Asa Hutchinson | 262,313 | 37.7% |
| Independent | Ralph Forbes | 52 | 0.1% |
| Majority | | 170,809 | 24.6% |
| Turnout | | 695,487 | |
| Democratic hold | | | |

== California ==
California election
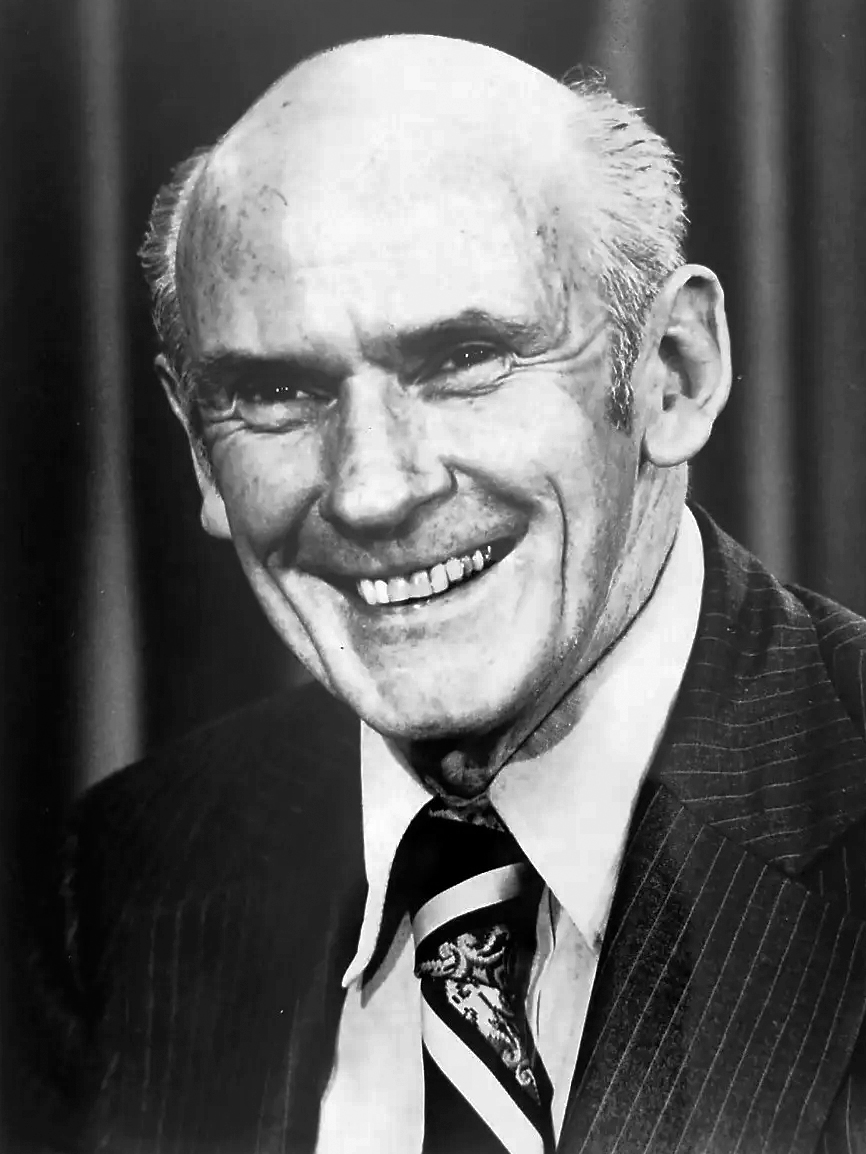

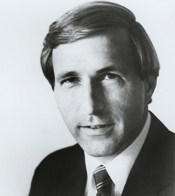
| Nominee | Alan Cranston | Ed Zschau |
| Party | Democratic | Republican |
| Popular vote | 3,646,672 | 3,541,804 |
| Percentage | 49.3% | 47.9% |
- County results Cranston: 40-50% 50–60% 60–70% 70–80% Zschau: 40–50% 50–60% 60–70%
U.S. senator before election
Alan Cranston
Democratic
Elected U.S. Senator
Alan Cranston
Democratic

Incumbent Democratic Alan Cranston won re-nomination over nominal Democratic opposition. Congressman Ed Zschau narrowly defeated Bruce Herschensohn in the Republican primary to secure the nomination. Cranston narrowly won re-election to a fourth term over Zschau, 49%-48%.

1986 United States Senate election, California
| Party | Candidate | Votes | % |
|---|---|---|---|
| Democratic | Alan Cranston (Incumbent) | 3,646,672 | 49.3% |
| Republican | Ed Zschau | 3,541,804 | 47.9% |
| American Independent | Edward B Vallen | 109,916 | 1.5% |
| Libertarian | Breck McKinley | 66,261 | 0.9% |
| Peace and Freedom | Paul Kangas | 33,869 | 0.5% |
| Majority | | 104,868 | 1.4% |
| Turnout | | 7,398,522 | |
| Democratic hold | | | |

== Colorado ==
Colorado election
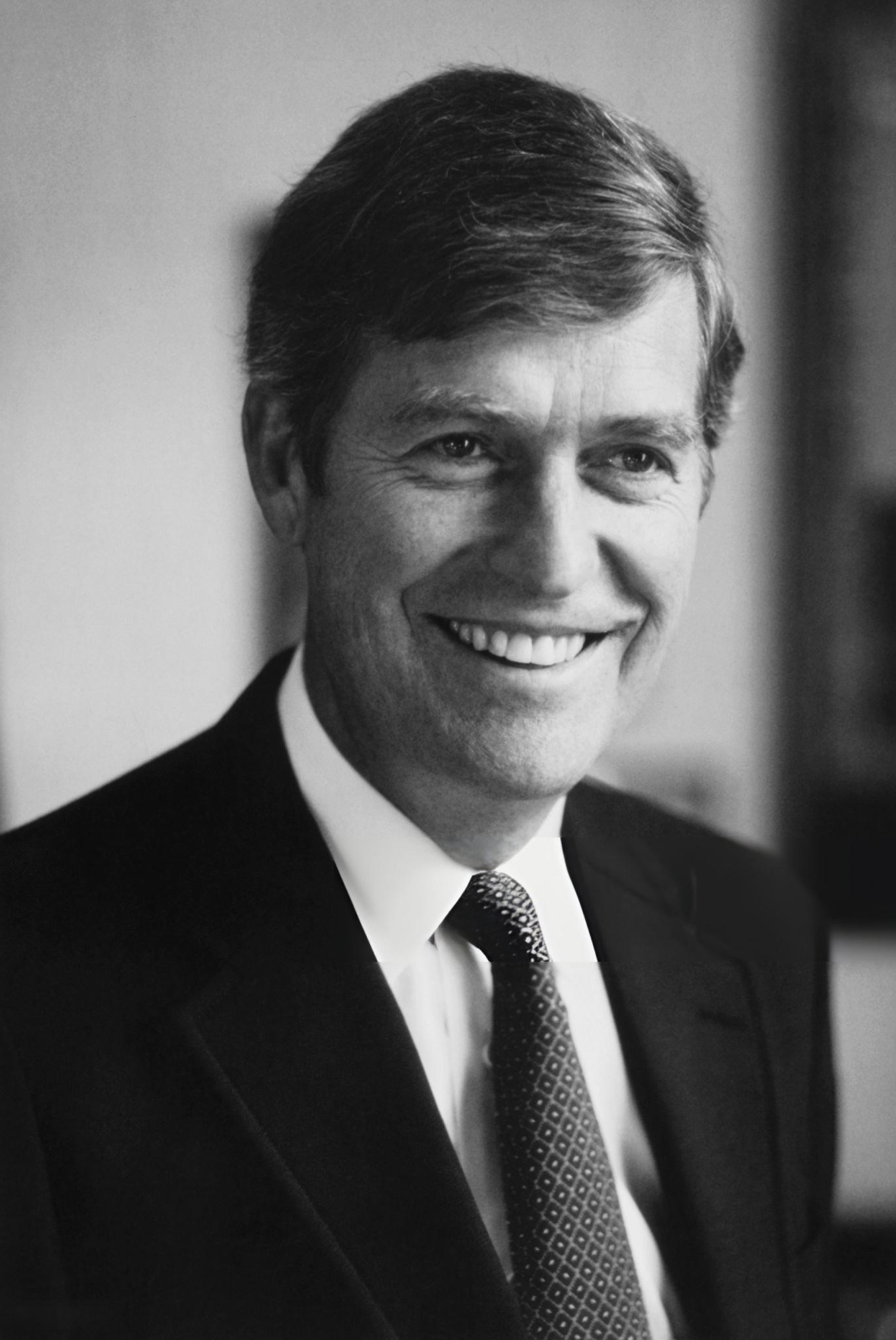

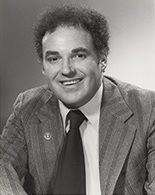
| Nominee | Tim Wirth | Ken Kramer |
| Party | Democratic | Republican |
| Popular vote | 529,449 | 512,994 |
| Percentage | 49.9% | 48.4% |
- County results Wirth: 40–50% 50–60% 60–70% Kramer: 40–50% 50–60% 60–70%
U.S. senator before election
Gary Hart
Democratic
Elected U.S. Senator
Tim Wirth
Democratic

Incumbent Democrat Gary Hart retired instead of seeking a third term. Democratic nominee Tim Wirth and Republican Ken Kramer ran unopposed for the seat. In an ultimately very close election, Wirth defeated Kramer by just under 2%. Wirth would retire and opt not to seek a second term.

General election results
| Party | Candidate | Votes | % | ±% |
|---|---|---|---|---|
| Democratic | Tim Wirth | 529,449 | 49.91% | −0.42% |
| Republican | Ken Kramer | 512,994 | 48.36% | −0.34% |
| Independent | Michael Martin Bush | 11,127 | 1.05% | |
| Socialist Workers | Michael R. Chamberlain | 3,756 | 0.35% | |
| Independent American | Henry John Olshaw | 1,868 | 0.18% | −0.17% |
| Prohibition | Calvin G. Dodge | 1,571 | 0.15% | |
| Majority | | 16,455 | 1.55% | −0.09% |
| Turnout | | 1,060,765 | | |
| Democratic hold | | Swing | | |

== Connecticut ==
Connecticut election
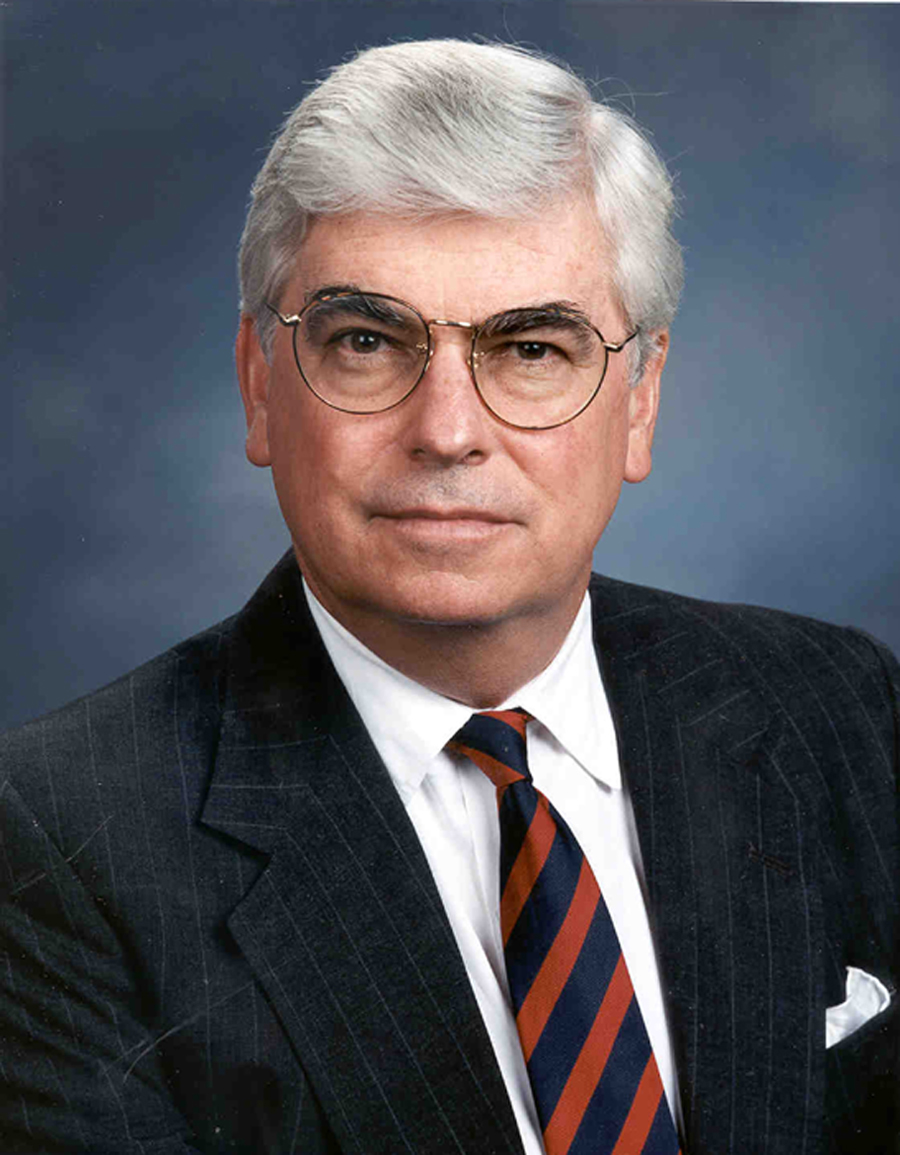

| Nominee | Chris Dodd | Roger Eddy |
| Party | Democratic | Republican |
| Popular vote | 632,695 | 340,438 |
| Percentage | 64.8% | 34.9% |
- Dodd: 50–60% 60–70% 70–80% 80–90% Eddy: 50–60% 60–70%
U.S. senator before election
Chris Dodd
Democratic
Elected U.S. Senator
Chris Dodd
Democratic

Incumbent Democrat Chris Dodd received the Democratic nomination with no opposition. Republican Roger Eddy of the Republican National Committee won the Republican nomination. Dodd handily defeated Eddy, 65%-35%.

1986 Connecticut United States Senate election
| Party | Candidate | Votes | % |
|---|---|---|---|
| Democratic | Chris Dodd (Incumbent) | 632,695 | 64.8% |
| Republican | Roger Eddy | 340,438 | 34.9% |
| Independent | Edward J. McCallum Jr. | 3,800 | 0.4% |
| Majority | | 292,257 | 29.9% |
| Turnout | | 976,933 | |
| Democratic hold | | | |

== Florida ==
Florida election
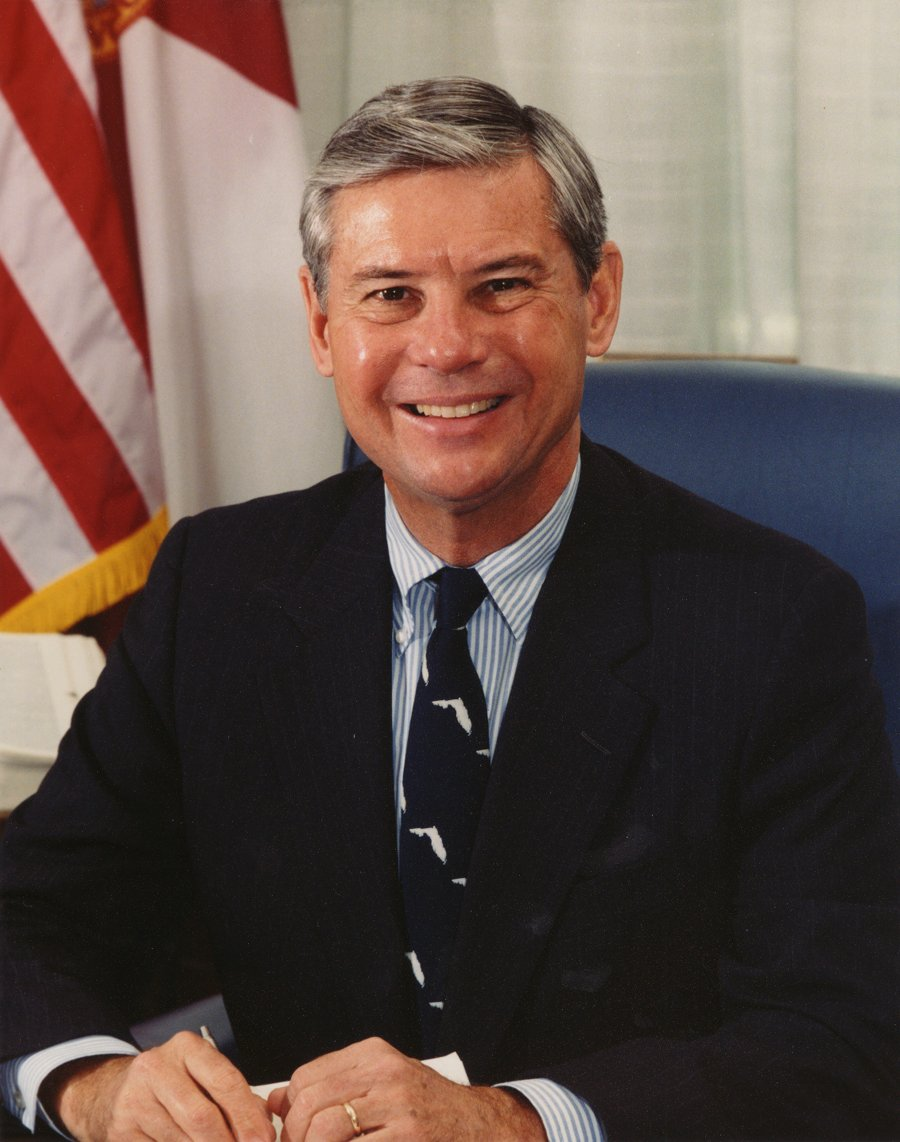

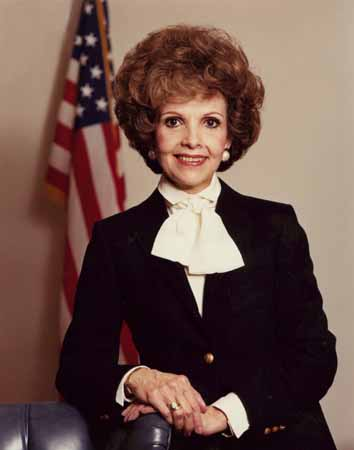
| Nominee | Bob Graham | Paula Hawkins |
| Party | Democratic | Republican |
| Popular vote | 1,877,543 | 1,552,376 |
| Percentage | 54.7% | 45.2% |
- County results Graham: 50–60% 60–70% Hawkins: 50–60% 60–70%
U.S. senator before election
Paula Hawkins
Republican
Elected U.S. Senator
Bob Graham
Democratic

Incumbent Republican Paula Hawkins won renomination with nominal opposition, but so did her Democratic opponent, popular Governor of Florida Bob Graham. Graham defeated Hawkins by nearly 9% on election day.

Democratic primary results
| Party | Candidate | Votes | % |
|---|---|---|---|
| Democratic | Bob Graham | 850,560 | 85.04% |
| Democratic | Bob Kunst | 149,657 | 14.96% |
| Total votes | | 1,000,217 | 100.00% |

Republican primary results
| Party | Candidate | Votes | % |
|---|---|---|---|
| Republican | Paula Hawkins (Incumbent) | 491,767 | 88.73% |
| Republican | Jon Larsen Shudlick | 62,443 | 11.27% |
| Total votes | | 554,210 | 100.00% |

General election results
| Party | Candidate | Votes | % | ±% |
|---|---|---|---|---|
| Democratic | Bob Graham | 1,877,543 | 54.74% | +6.40% |
| Republican | Paula Hawkins (Incumbent) | 1,552,376 | 45.26% | −6.40% |
| Write-ins | | 77 | 0.00% | |
| Majority | | 325,167 | 9.48% | +6.16% |
| Turnout | | 3,429,996 | | |
| Democratic gain from Republican | | Swing | | |

== Georgia ==
Georgia election
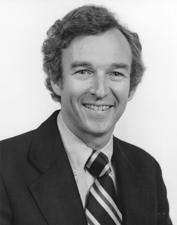

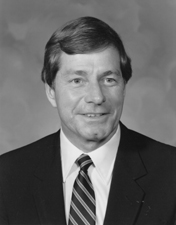
| Nominee | Wyche Fowler | Mack Mattingly |
| Party | Democratic | Republican |
| Popular vote | 623,707 | 601,241 |
| Percentage | 50.92% | 49.08% |
- County results Fowler: 50–60% 60–70% 70–80% Mattingly: 50–60% 60–70%
U.S. senator before election
Mack Mattingly
Republican
Elected U.S. Senator
Wyche Fowler
Democratic

Incumbent Republican Mack Mattingly decided to run for re-election and lost a close race to Democratic U.S. Congressman Wyche Fowler, who had defeated former White House Chief of Staff Hamilton Jordan in the Democratic primary. Fowler would lose re-election in 1992.

1986 United States Senate election, Georgia
| Party | Candidate | Votes | % | ±% |
|---|---|---|---|---|
| Democratic | Wyche Fowler | 623,707 | 50.91% | +1.78% |
| Republican | Mack Mattingly (Incumbent) | 601,241 | 49.08% | −1.79% |
| | Write-In Votes | 60 | 0.00% | N/A |
| Majority | | 22,466 | 1.83% | +.09% |
| Turnout | | 1,225,008 | | |
| Democratic gain from Republican | | Swing | 1.78% | |

== Hawaii ==
Hawaii election
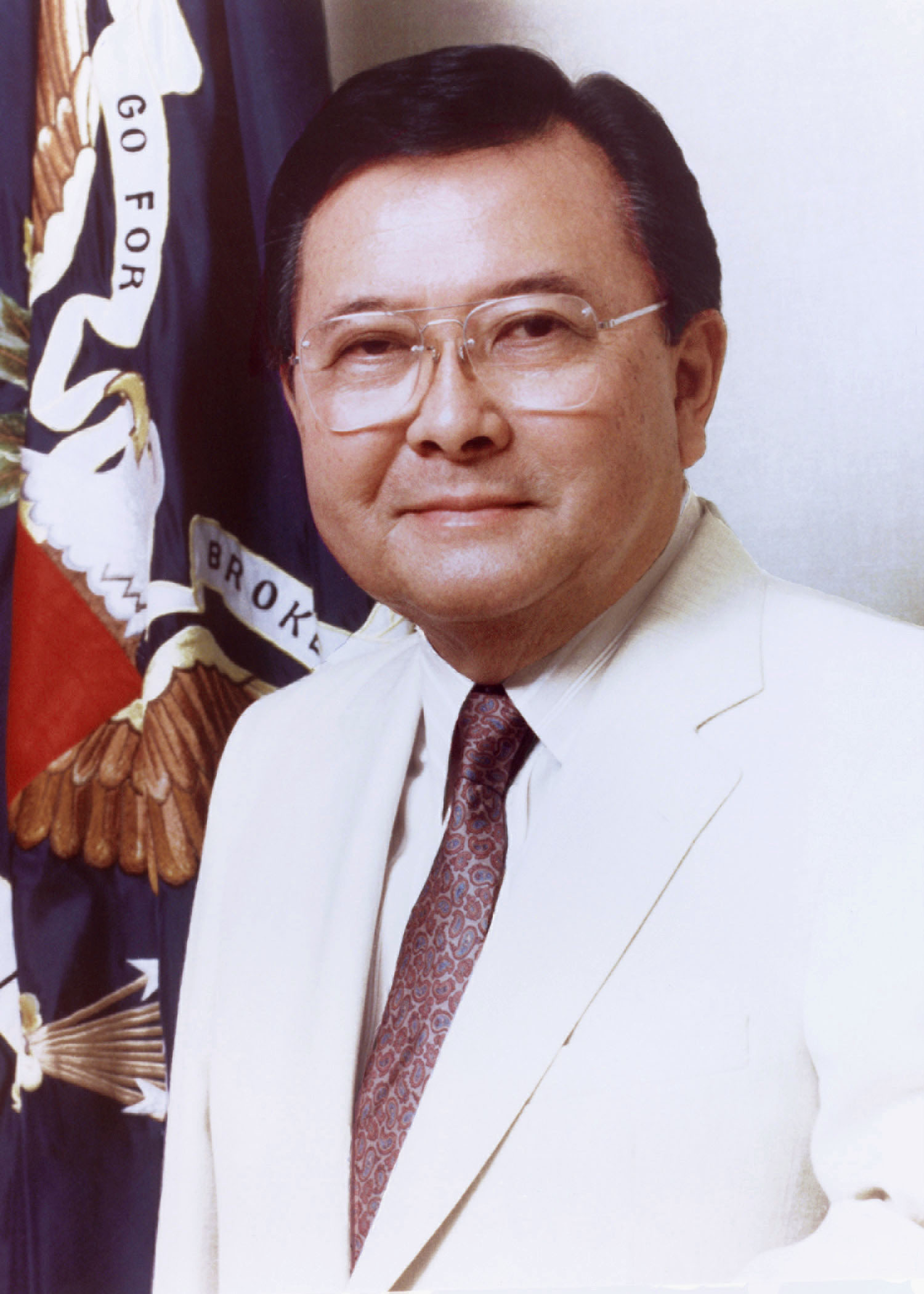

| Nominee | Daniel Inouye | Frank Hutchinson |
| Party | Democratic | Republican |
| Popular vote | 241,887 | 86,910 |
| Percentage | 73.6% | 26.4% |
- County results Inouye: 70–80% 80–90%
U.S. senator before election
Daniel Inouye
Democratic
Elected U.S. Senator
Daniel Inouye
Democratic

Incumbent Democratic Daniel Inouye won re-election to a fifth term, 74%-26%, over Republican Frank Hutchinson, who had defeated Marvin Franklin in the Republican primary.

1986 United States Senate election in Hawaii
| Party | Candidate | Votes | % | ±% |
|---|---|---|---|---|
| Democratic | Daniel Inouye (Incumbent) | 241,887 | 73.57% | |
| Republican | Frank Hutchinson | 86,910 | 26.43% | |
| Majority | | 154,977 | 47.14% | |
| Turnout | | 328,797 | | |
| Democratic hold | | Swing | | |

== Idaho ==
Idaho election
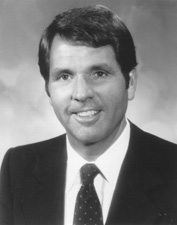

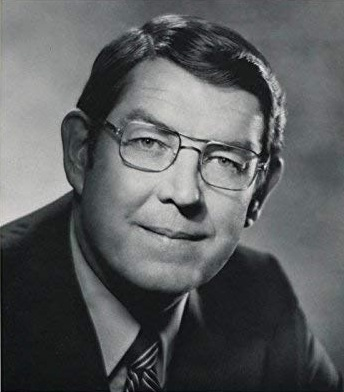
| Nominee | Steve Symms | John V. Evans |
| Party | Republican | Democratic |
| Popular vote | 196,958 | 185,066 |
| Percentage | 51.6% | 48.4% |
- County results Symms: 50–60% 60–70% 70–80% Evans: 50–60% 60–70%
U.S. senator before election
Steve Symms
Republican
Elected U.S. Senator
Steve Symms
Republican

Incumbent Republican Steve Symms won re-election to a second term over Democratic Governor John V. Evans. Evans was a popular governor, and the race was ultimately close, but Symms prevailed by just over 2%.

General election results
| Party | Candidate | Votes | % | ±% |
|---|---|---|---|---|
| Republican | Steve Symms (Incumbent) | 196,958 | 51.56% | +1.81% |
| Democratic | John V. Evans | 185,066 | 48.44% | −0.33% |
| Majority | | 11,892 | 3.11% | +2.14% |
| Turnout | | 382,024 | | |
| Republican hold | | Swing | | |

== Illinois ==
Illinois election
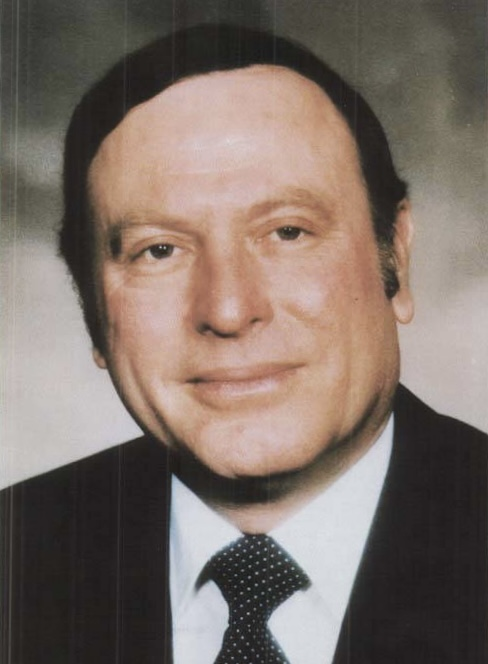

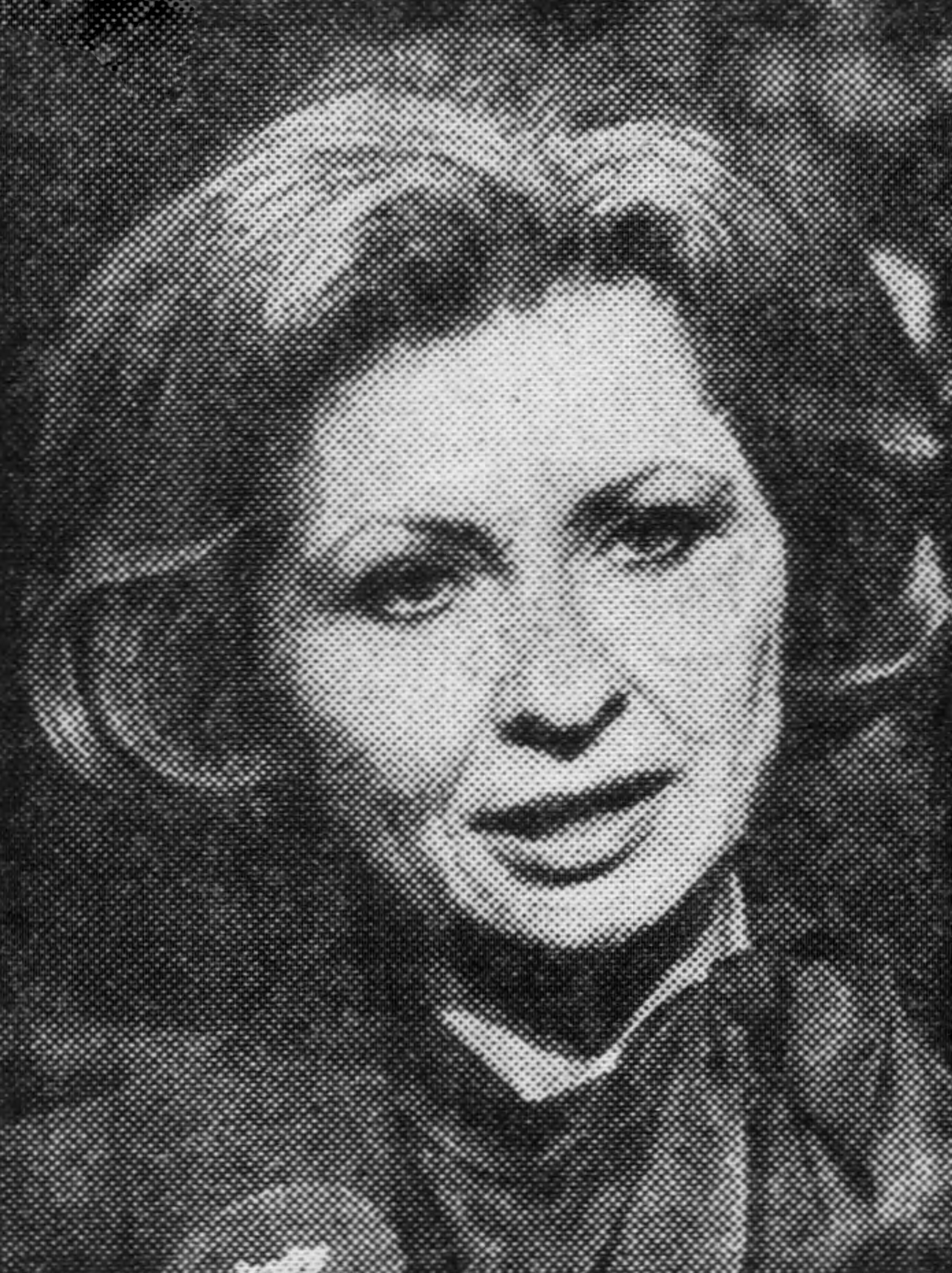
| Nominee | Alan Dixon | Judy Koehler |
| Party | Democratic | Republican |
| Popular vote | 2,033,783 | 1,053,734 |
| Percentage | 65.1% | 33.7% |
- County results Dixon: 40–50% 50–60% 60–70% 70–80% Koehler: 40–50% 50–60% 60–70%
U.S. senator before election
Alan J. Dixon
Democratic
Elected U.S. Senator
Alan J. Dixon
Democratic

The incumbent Democratic Alan J. Dixon won re-election to a second term over Republican State Representative Judy Koehler, who won the Republican nomination over George Ranney. This was also the last time until 2022 that a winning Senate Candidate was elected to this seat twice.

Dixon easily won the senate race. Koehler fared poorly throughout most parts of the state, only winning 10 of the states 102 counties.

1986 Illinois United States Senate election
| Party | Candidate | Votes | % | ±% |
|---|---|---|---|---|
| Democratic | Alan J. Dixon (Incumbent) | 2,033,783 | 65.1% | +9.1% |
| Republican | Judy Koehler | 1,053,734 | 33.7% | −8.8% |
| Independent | Einar V. Dyhrkopp | 15,804 | 0.5% | |
| Libertarian | Don Parrish | 13,891 | 0.5% | |
| Socialist Workers | Omari Musa | 5,671 | 0.2% | |
| Majority | | 980,049 | 31.4% | |
| Turnout | | 3,122,883 | | |
| Democratic hold | | Swing | | |

== Indiana ==
Indiana election
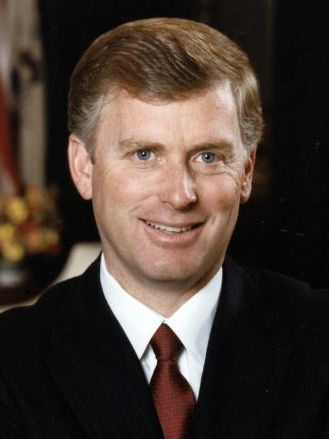

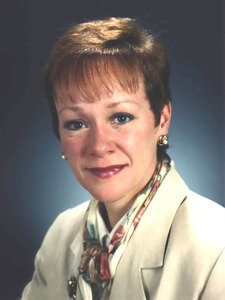
| Nominee | Dan Quayle | Jill Long Thompson |
| Party | Republican | Democratic |
| Popular vote | 936,143 | 595,192 |
| Percentage | 60.6% | 38.5% |
- County results Quayle: 50-60% 60-70% 70-80% Long: 50–60%
U.S. senator before election
Dan Quayle
Republican
Elected U.S. Senator
Dan Quayle
Republican

Incumbent Republican Dan Quayle won re-election to a second term over Democratic Valparaiso City Councilwoman Jill L. Long.

General election results
| Party | Candidate | Votes | % |
|---|---|---|---|
| Republican | Dan Quayle (Incumbent) | 936,143 | 60.57% |
| Democratic | Jill L. Long | 595,192 | 38.51% |
| Libertarian | Bradford Warren | 8,314 | 0.54% |
| American | Rockland Snyder | 5,914 | 0.38% |
| Majority | | 340,951 | 22.06% |
| Turnout | | 1,545,563 | |
| Republican hold | | | |

== Iowa ==
Iowa election
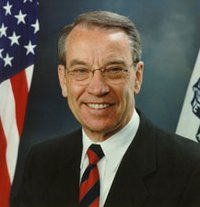

| Nominee | Chuck Grassley | John P. Roehrick |
| Party | Republican | Democratic |
| Popular vote | 588,880 | 299,406 |
| Percentage | 66.04% | 33.57% |
- County results Grassley: 50-60% 60-70% 70-80% 80–90% Roehrick: 40–50%
U.S. senator before election
Chuck Grassley
Republican
Elected U.S. Senator
Chuck Grassley
Republican

Incumbent Republican Chuck Grassley ran for re-election to a second term, which he won easily over Democratic nominee John P. Roehrick, an attorney.

Democratic primary results
| Party | Candidate | Votes | % |
|---|---|---|---|
| Democratic | John P. Roehrick | 88,347 | 83.83% |
| Democratic | Juan Cortez | 16,987 | 16.12% |
| Democratic | Write-ins | 60 | 0.06% |
| Total votes | | 105,394 | 100.00% |

Republican primary results
| Party | Candidate | Votes | % |
|---|---|---|---|
| Republican | Chuck Grassley (Incumbent) | 108,370 | 99.96% |
| Republican | Write-ins | 38 | 0.04% |
| Total votes | | 108,408 | 100.00% |

1986 United States Senate election in Iowa
| Party | Candidate | Votes | % | ±% |
|---|---|---|---|---|
| Republican | Chuck Grassley (Incumbent) | 588,880 | 66.04% | +12.55% |
| Democratic | John P. Roehrick | 299,406 | 33.57% | −11.97% |
| Independent | John Masters | 3,370 | 0.38% | |
| Write-ins | | 106 | 0.01% | |
| Majority | | 289,474 | 32.46% | +24.51% |
| Turnout | | 891,762 | | |
| Republican hold | | Swing | | |

== Kansas ==
Kansas election
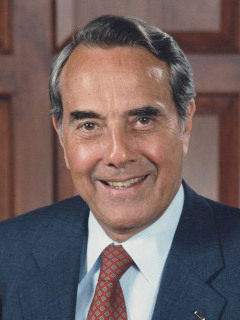

| Nominee | Bob Dole | Guy MacDonald |
| Party | Republican | Democratic |
| Popular vote | 576,902 | 246,664 |
| Percentage | 70.05% | 29.95% |
- County Results; Dole: 50–60% 60–70% 70–80%
U.S. senator before election
Bob Dole
Republican
Elected U.S. Senator
Bob Dole
Republican

Incumbent Republican Bob Dole ran for re-election to a fourth term, which he won easily over Democratic nominee Guy MacDonald, a school teacher, who had narrowly prevailed in a crowded field of Democratic candidates.

1986 United States Senate election in Kansas
| Party | Candidate | Votes | % | ±% |
|---|---|---|---|---|
| Republican | Bob Dole (Incumbent) | 576,902 | 70.05% | |
| Democratic | Guy MacDonald | 246,664 | 29.95% | |
| Majority | | 330,238 | 40.10% | |
| Turnout | | 823,566 | | |
| Republican hold | | Swing | | |

== Kentucky ==
Kentucky election
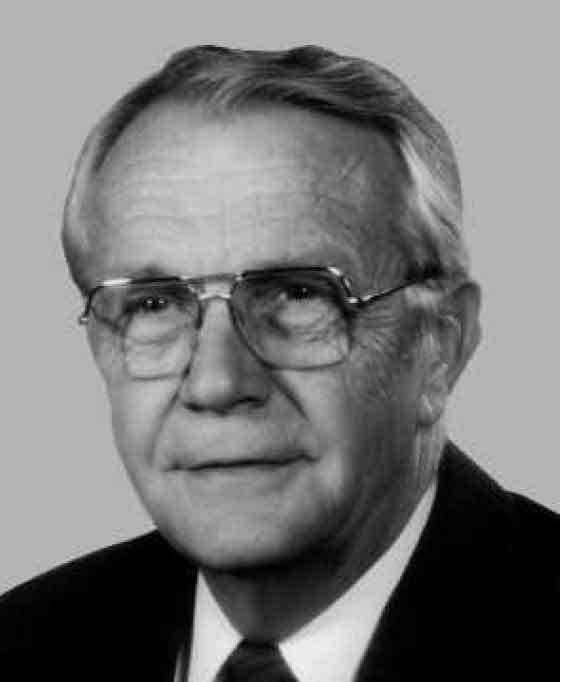
| Nominee | Wendell Ford | Jackson Andrews |
| Party | Democratic | Republican |
| Popular vote | 503,775 | 173,330 |
| Percentage | 74.40% | 25.60% |
- Country results Ford: 50–60% 60–70% 70–80% 80–90% >90%
U.S. senator before election
Wendell Ford
Democratic
Elected U.S. Senator
Wendell Ford
Democratic

Democrat Wendell Ford won re-election, He defeated Republican Jackson Andrews, who emerged from a competitive primary.

General election results
| Party | Candidate | Votes | % |
|---|---|---|---|
| Democratic | Wendell Ford (incumbent) | 503,775 | 74.40% |
| Republican | Jackson Andrews | 173,330 | 25.60% |
| Democratic hold | | | |

== Louisiana ==
Louisiana election
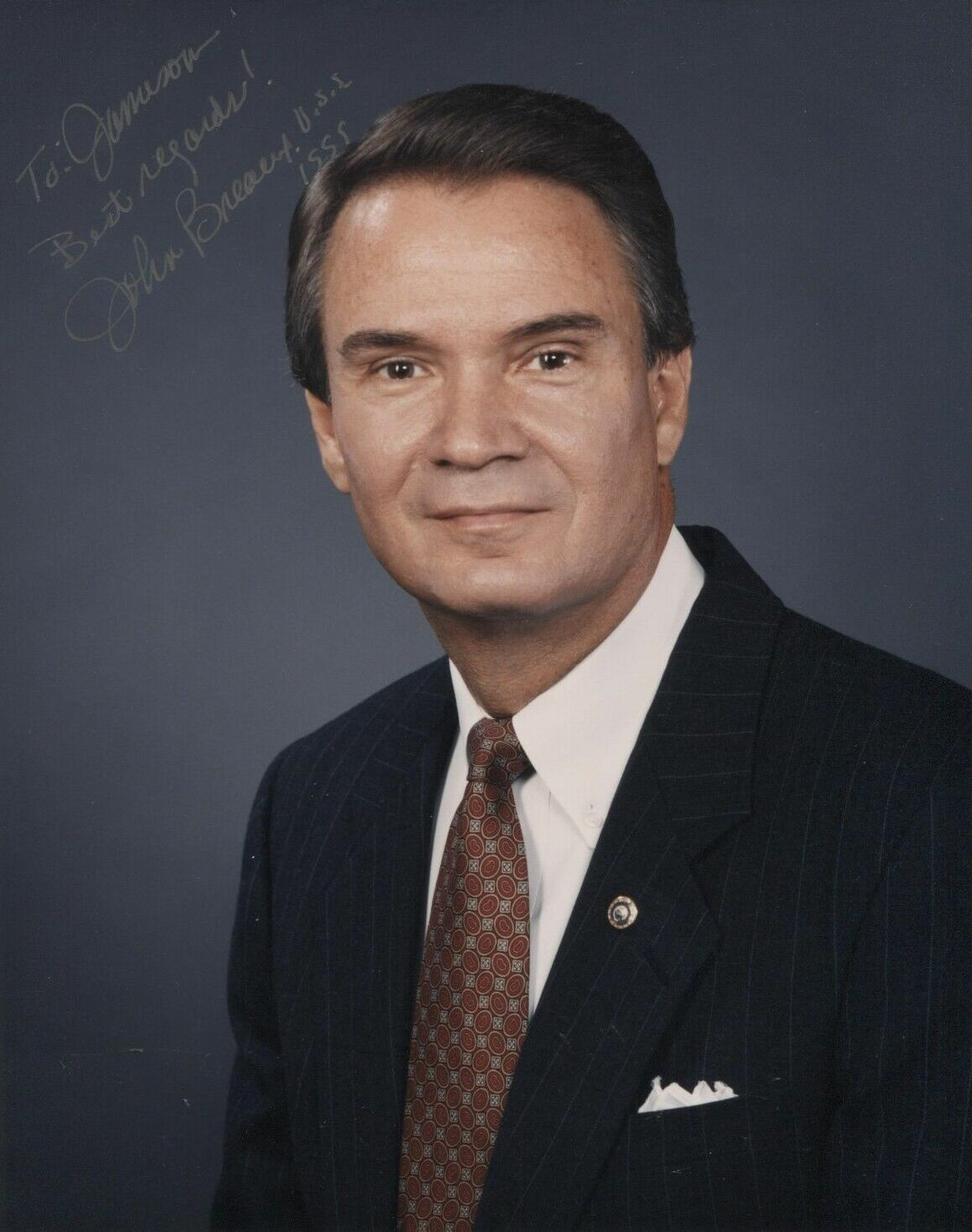

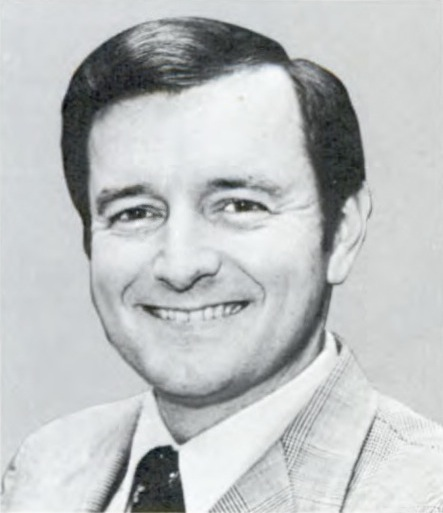
| Nominee | John Breaux | Henson Moore |
| Party | Democratic | Republican |
| Popular vote | 723,586 | 646,311 |
| Percentage | 52.82% | 47.18% |
- Parish Results; Breaux: 50–60% 60–70% 70–80% Moore: 50–60% 60–70%
U.S. senator before election
Russell B. Long
Democratic
Elected U.S. Senator
John Breaux
Democratic

Incumbent Democratic Russell B. Long decided to retire instead of seeking an eighth term. The open seat was won by Democrat U.S. Representative John Breaux, who beat Republican U.S. Representative Henson Moore by just over 5% after the two finished second and first in the open primary, respectively.

1986 United States Senate election in Louisiana
| Party | Candidate | Votes | % | ±% |
|---|---|---|---|---|
| Democratic | John Breaux | 723,586 | 52.82% | |
| Republican | W. Henson Moore | 646,311 | 47.18% | |
| Majority | | 77,275 | 5.64% | |
| Turnout | | 1,369,897 | | |
| Democratic hold | | Swing | | |

== Maryland ==
Maryland election
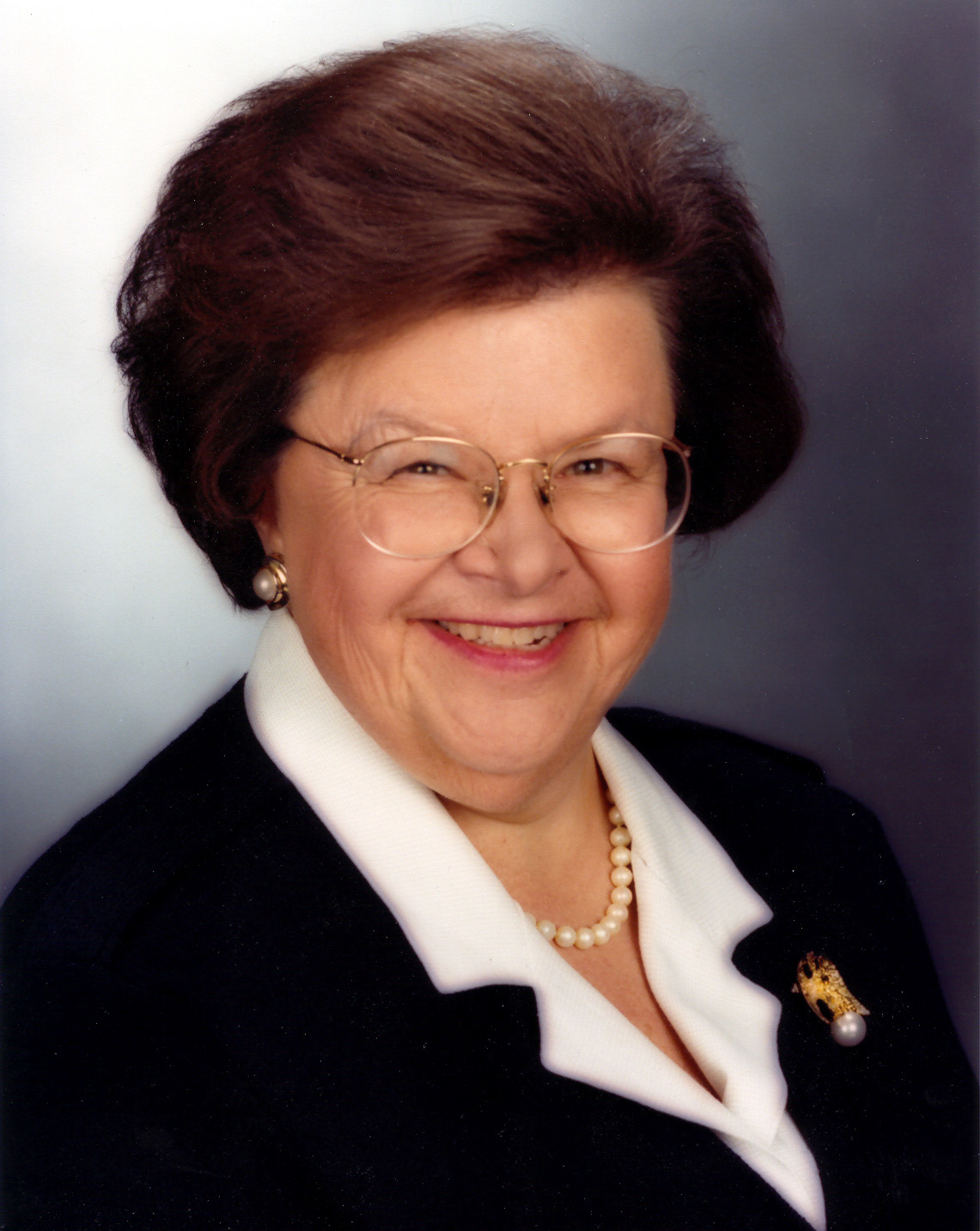

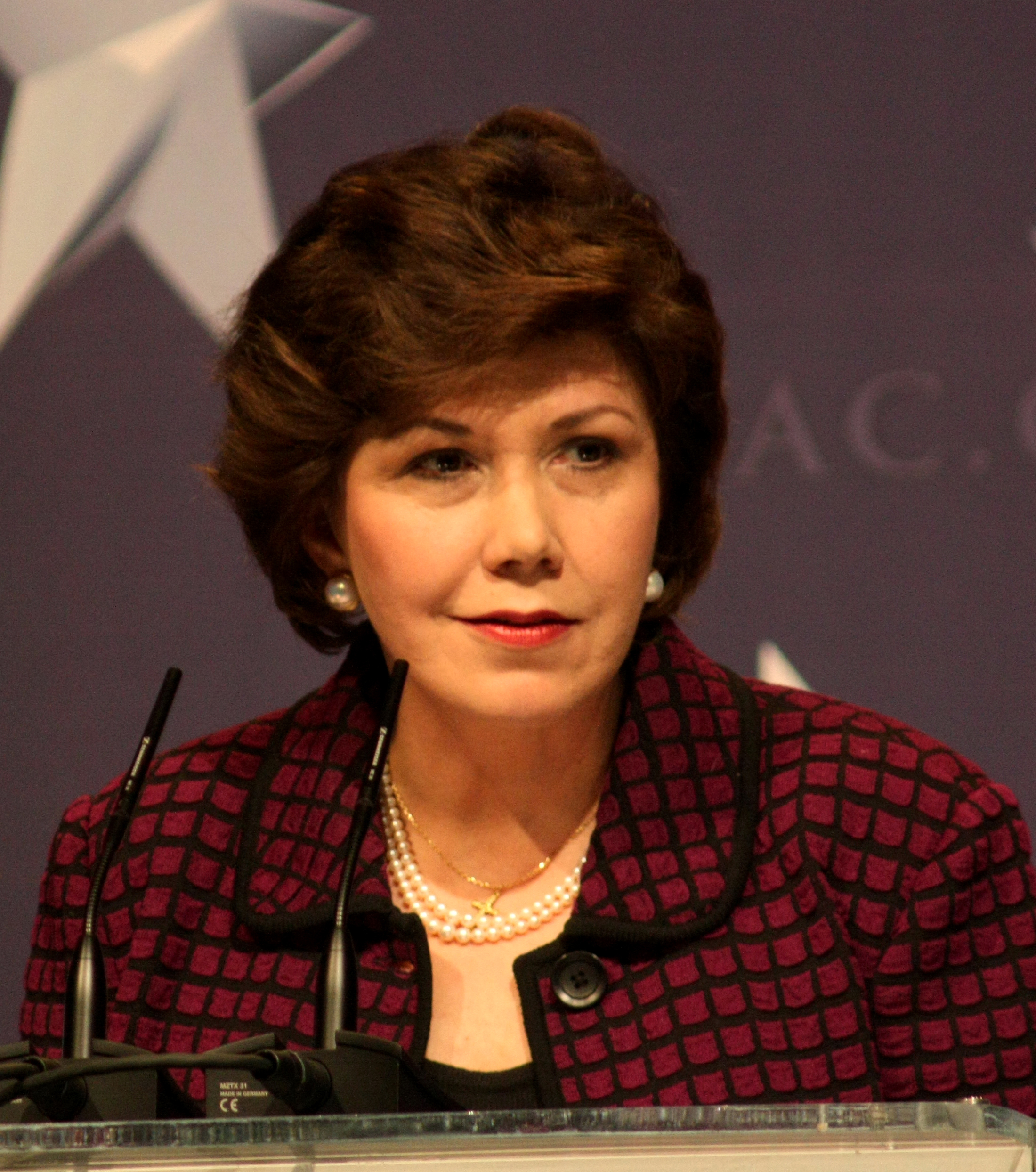
| Nominee | Barbara Mikulski | Linda Chavez |
| Party | Democratic | Republican |
| Popular vote | 675,225 | 437,411 |
| Percentage | 60.7% | 39.3% |
- County results Mikulski: 50–60% 60–70% 80–90% Chavez: 50–60% 60–70%
U.S. senator before election
Charles Mathias
Republican
Elected U.S. Senator
Barbara Mikulski
Democratic

Incumbent Republican Charles Mathias decided to retire, instead of seeking a fourth term. At the time of this announcement, it was expected that then-Governor Harry Hughes would run for the seat being vacated by retiring Senator Mathias. However, Hughes became caught up in the aftermath of the Maryland savings and loan crisis. He lost popularity with voters, opening the door for Mikulski's bid for the Senate. Congresswoman Barbara Mikulski received the Democratic nomination over fellow Congressman Michael D. Barnes and governor Harry Hughes, the last of whom finished third. Mikulski had previously run for the seat in 1974.

Chavez won the primary handily, defeating several Republican challengers. Later, she made comments that some Mikulski supporters interpreted as an attempt to draw attention to the issue of Mikulski's sexual orientation. In an article quoting Chavez's claim that Mikulski was a "San Francisco-style, George McGovern, liberal Democrat", The Washington Post reported that Chavez was directly implying that the never-married Mikulski was a lesbian. Chavez was accused of making Mikulski's sexual orientation a central issue of the political campaign. In defending her use of the phrase, Chavez stated the line "San Francisco Democrats" was a reference to Jeane Kirkpatrick's 1984 Republican National Convention "Blame America First" speech, in which Kirkpatrick coined the phrase "San Francisco Liberal.". The phrase "San Francisco liberal" was common at the time.

Mikulski eventually won the race with 61 percent of the vote. She was the first female Democrat elected to the U.S. Senate in her own right (not appointed or filling a seat of a deceased husband). No Republican since Mathias has represented Maryland in the U.S. Senate.

Democratic primary results
| Party | Candidate | Votes | % |
|---|---|---|---|
| Democratic | Barbara A. Mikulski | 307,876 | 49.50% |
| Democratic | Michael D. Barnes | 195,086 | 31.37% |
| Democratic | Harry Hughes | 88,908 | 14.30% |
| Democratic | Debra Hanania Freeman | 9,350 | 1.50% |
| Democratic | Edward M. Olszewski | 7,877 | 1.27% |
| Democratic | A. Robert Kaufman | 6,505 | 1.05% |
| Democratic | Boyd E. Sweatt | 3,580 | 0.58% |
| Democratic | Leonard E. Trout Jr. | 2,742 | 0.44% |
| Total votes | | 621,924 | 100.00% |

Republican primary results
| Party | Candidate | Votes | % |
|---|---|---|---|
| Republican | Linda Chavez | 100,888 | 73.07% |
| Republican | Michael Schaefer | 16,902 | 12.24% |
| Republican | George Haley | 5,808 | 4.21% |
| Republican | Melvin Perkins | 2,785 | 2.02% |
| Republican | Nicholas T. Nonnenmacher | 2,751 | 1.99% |
| Republican | Richard Sullivan | 2,328 | 1.69% |
| Republican | Howard D. Greyber | 1,678 | 1.22% |
| Republican | Monroe Cornish | 1,497 | 1.08% |
| Republican | Herbert Stone Rosenberg | 1,337 | 0.97% |
| Republican | Horace Stuart Rich | 1,199 | 0.87% |
| Republican | Abraham H. Kalish | 901 | 0.65% |
| Total votes | | 138,074 | 100.00% |

1986 United States Senate election in Maryland
| Party | Candidate | Votes | % | ±% |
|---|---|---|---|---|
| Democratic | Barbara A. Mikulski | 675,225 | 60.69% | +26.85% |
| Republican | Linda Chavez | 437,411 | 39.31% | −26.85% |
| Majority | | 237,814 | 21.37% | −10.96% |
| Total votes | | 1,017,151 | 100.00% | |
| Democratic gain from Republican | | Swing | | |

== Missouri ==
Missouri election
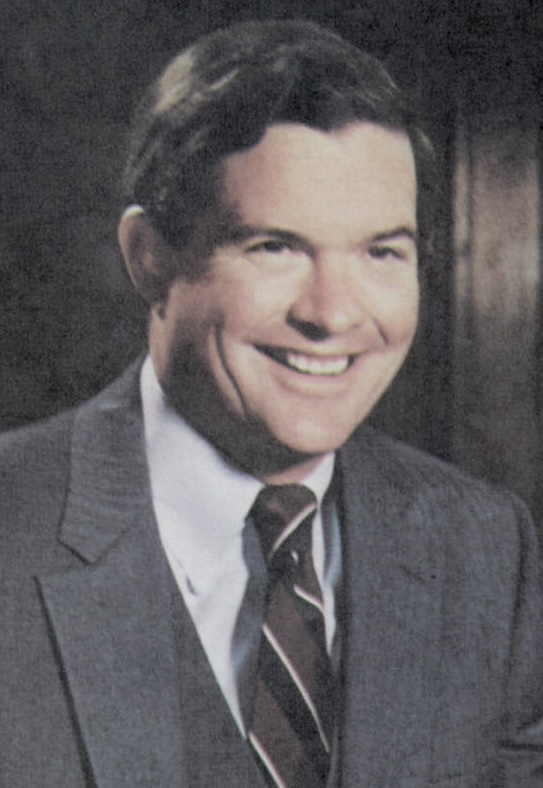

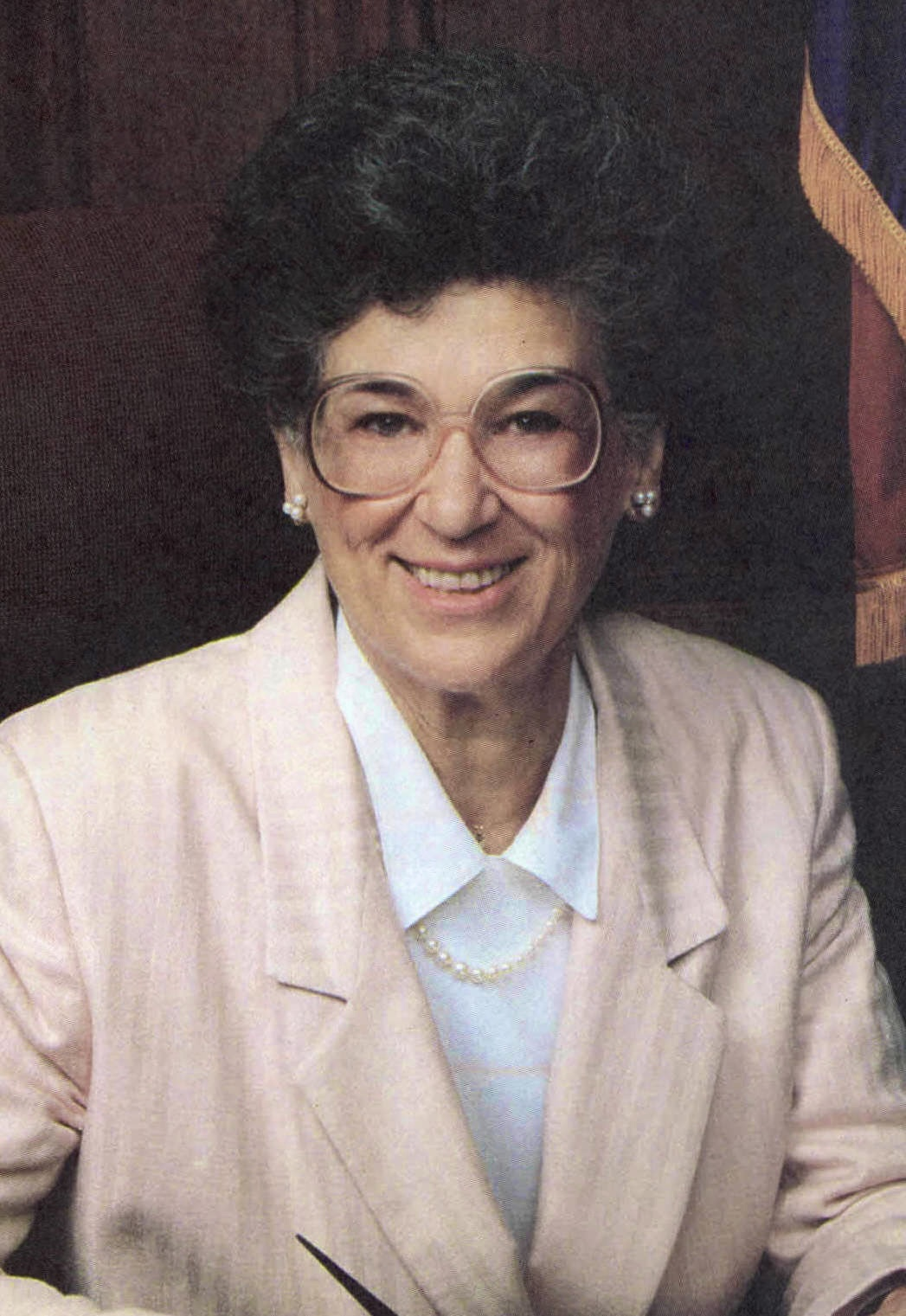
| Nominee | Kit Bond | Harriett Woods |
| Party | Republican | Democratic |
| Popular vote | 777,612 | 699,624 |
| Percentage | 52.6% | 47.4% |
- County results Bond: 50-60% 60-70% 70-80% Woods: 50–60% 60–70%
U.S. senator before election
Thomas Eagleton
Democratic
Elected U.S. Senator
Kit Bond
Republican

Incumbent Democrat Tom Eagleton decided to retire instead of seeking a fourth term. Republican Governor Kit Bond won the open seat, beating Democratic Lieutenant Governor Harriett Woods.

General election results
| Party | Candidate | Votes | % |
|---|---|---|---|
| Republican | Kit Bond | 777,612 | 52.6% |
| Democratic | Harriett Woods | 699,624 | 47.4% |
| Majority | | 77,988 | 5.2% |
| Turnout | | 1,477,236 | |
| Republican gain from Democratic | | | |

== Nevada ==
Nevada election
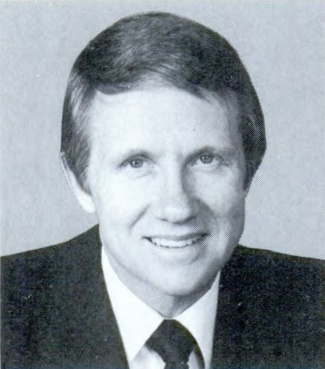

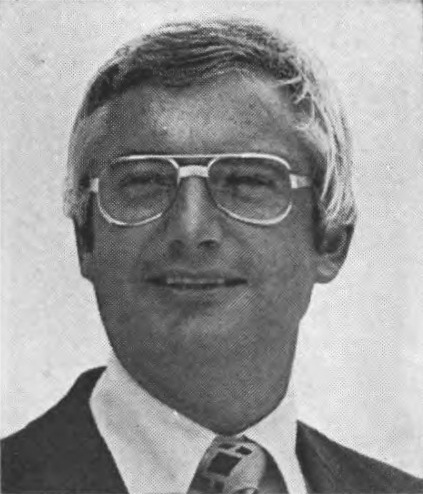
| Nominee | Harry Reid | Jim Santini |
| Party | Democratic | Republican |
| Popular vote | 130,955 | 116,606 |
| Percentage | 50.0% | 44.5% |
- County results Reid: 40–50% 60–70% Santini: 40–50% 50–60% 60–70% 70–80%
U.S. senator before election
Paul Laxalt
Republican
Elected U.S. Senator
Harry Reid
Democratic

Incumbent Republican Paul Laxalt decided to retire instead of seeking a third term. U.S. Representative Democratic nominee Harry Reid won the open seat over Republican former U.S. Representative James David Santini. Reid had previously run for the seat in 1974.

General election results
| Party | Candidate | Votes | % | ±% |
|---|---|---|---|---|
| Democratic | Harry Reid | 130,955 | 50.00% | +12.61% |
| Republican | Jim Santini | 116,606 | 44.52% | −14.01% |
| None of These Candidates | | 9,472 | 3.62% | +2.33% |
| Libertarian | Kent Cromwell | 4,899 | 1.87% | −0.94% |
| Majority | | 14,349 | 5.48% | −15.66% |
| Turnout | | 261,932 | | |
| Democratic gain from Republican | | Swing | | |

== New Hampshire ==
New Hampshire election
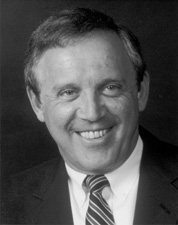

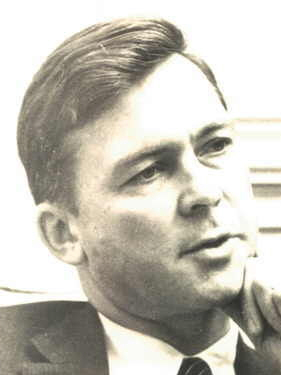
| Nominee | Warren Rudman | Endicott Peabody |
| Party | Republican | Democratic |
| Popular vote | 154,090 | 79,222 |
| Percentage | 63.0% | 32.4% |
- Rudman: 40–50% 50–60% 60–70% 70–80% 80–90% Peabody: 40–50% 50–60% >90%
U.S. senator before election
Warren Rudman
Republican
Elected U.S. Senator
Warren Rudman
Republican

Incumbent Republican Warren Rudman won re-election to a second term, beating the Democratic former Governor of Massachusetts Endicott Peabody.

General election results
| Party | Candidate | Votes | % |
|---|---|---|---|
| Republican | Warren Rudman (Incumbent) | 154,090 | 63.0% |
| Democratic | Endicott Peabody | 79,222 | 32.4% |
| Independent | Bruce Valley | 11,423 | 4.7% |
| Majority | | 74,868 | 30.6% |
| Turnout | | 244,735 | |
| Republican hold | | | |

== New York ==
New York election
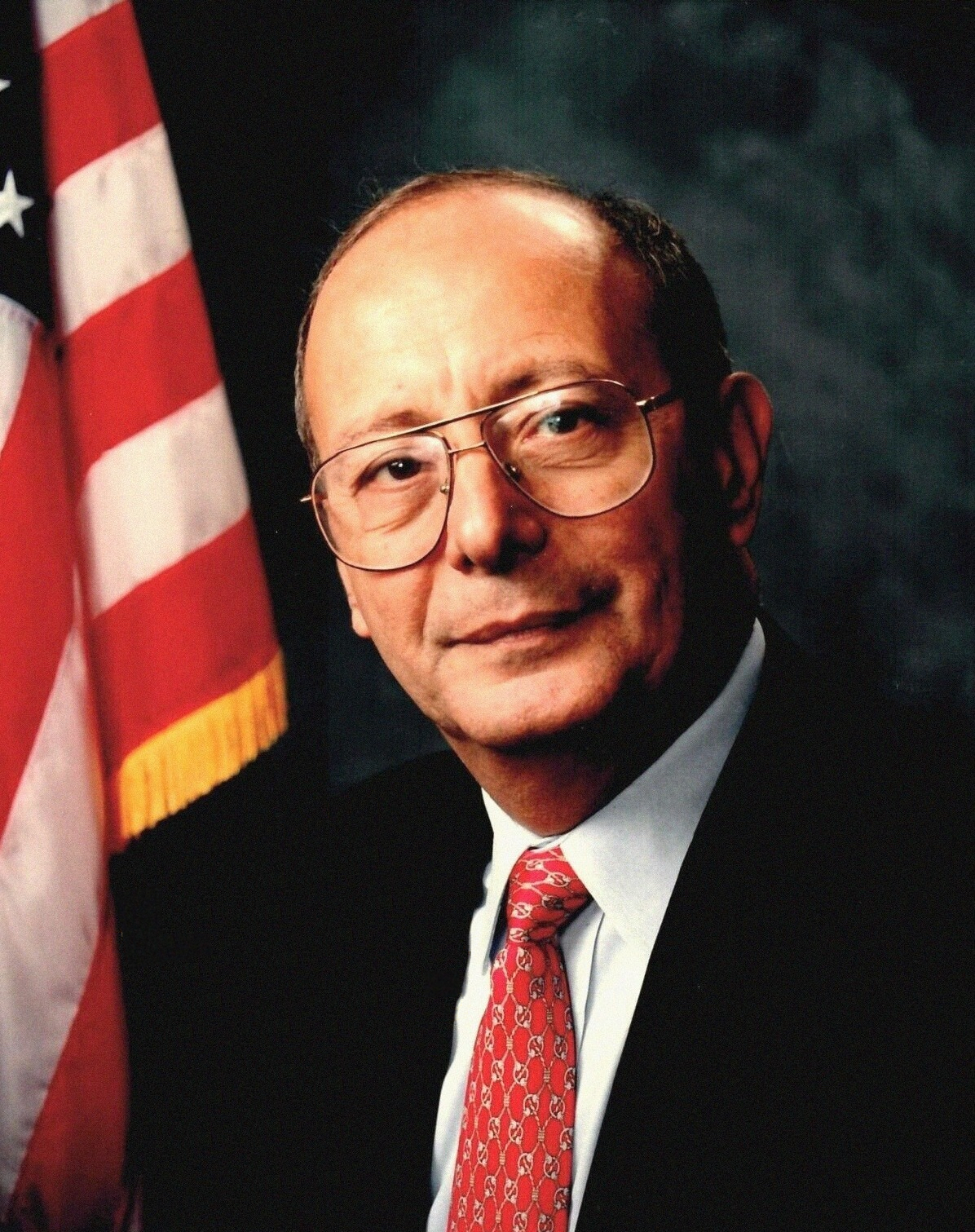

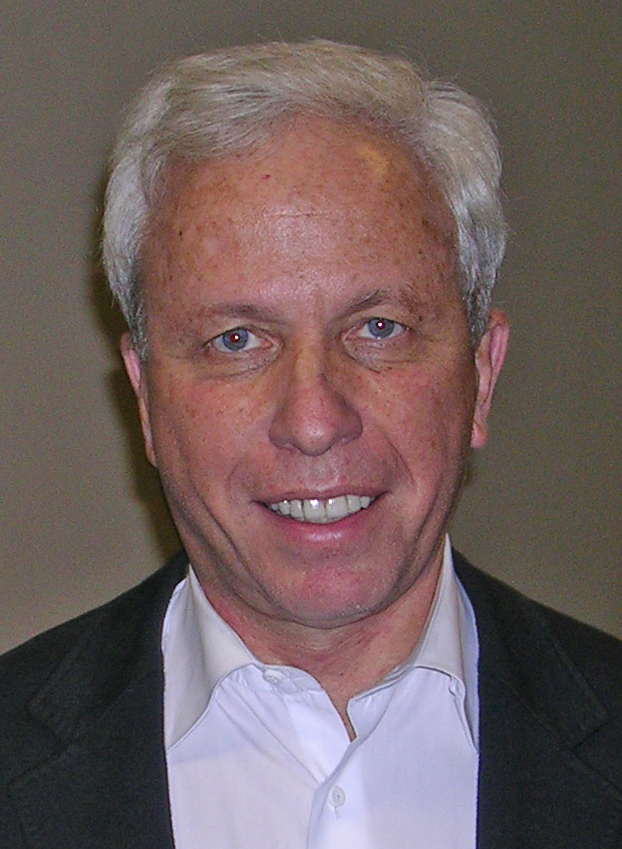
| Nominee | Al D'Amato | Mark Green |
| Party | Republican | Democratic |
| Popular vote | 2,378,197 | 1,723,216 |
| Percentage | 56.9% | 41.2% |
- County results D'Amato: 40–50% 50–60% 60–70% 70–80% Green: 40–50% 50–60% 60–70%
U.S. senator before election
Al D'Amato
Republican
Elected U.S. Senator
Al D'Amato
Republican

Incumbent Republican Al D'Amato won re-election to a second term over Democrat Mark Green, the Chief Speechwriter for U.S. Senator Gary Hart and former congressional candidate. Green had won a contested primary over the more moderate John S. Dyson. D'Amato won most counties in the state, losing just 5 counties. This was D'Amato's largest margin of victory during his Senate career.

1986 New York U.S. Senate general election
| Party | Candidate | Votes | % |
|---|---|---|---|
| Republican | Al D'Amato (Incumbent) | 2,030,260 | |
| Conservative | Al D'Amato | 212,101 | |
| Right to Life | Al D'Amato | 135,386 | |
| total | Al D'Amato | 2,378,197 | 56.9% |
| Democratic | Mark Green | 1,723,216 | 41.2% |
| Liberal | John S. Dyson | 60,099 | 1.4% |
| New Alliance | Fred Newman | 10,559 | 0.3% |
| Socialist Workers | Michael Shur | 7,376 | 0.2% |
| Others | | 305,412 | |
| Majority | | 654,981 | 15.7% |
| Turnout | | 4,179,447 | |
| Republican hold | | | |

== North Carolina ==
There were two elections in North Carolina.

Incumbent Republican Jim Broyhill, who had been appointed in June 1986 to serve out the rest of John Porter East's term, faced off against the popular Democratic former Governor Terry Sanford. There were two separate elections held on the same day: a special election for what little remained of the 99th United States Congress (November 1986 – January 1987) and a regular election for a new six-year term (beginning in January 1987). Sanford won both elections.

The primary elections would nominate candidates to the special and the regular election.

=== North Carolina (regular) ===
North Carolina election
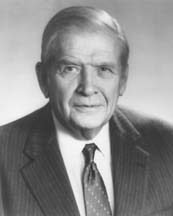

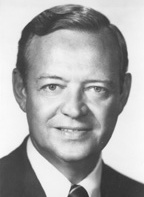
| Nominee | Terry Sanford | Jim Broyhill |
| Party | Democratic | Republican |
| Popular vote | 823,662 | 767,668 |
| Percentage | 51.76% | 48.24% |
- County results Sanford: 50–60% 60–70% 70–80% Broyhill: 50–60% 60–70% 70–80%
U.S. senator before election
Jim Broyhill
Republican
Elected U.S. Senator
Terry Sanford
Democratic

Terry Sanford, then the outgoing president of Duke University, first said in September 1985 that he was planning to run for the U.S. Senate the next year but quickly withdrew, as it appeared that the party wanted a "fresh" face, most likely in the person of UNC System President William Friday. Then, Friday declined to run, as did other well-known politicians like former Gov. Jim Hunt. Former North Carolina Secretary of Commerce Lauch Faircloth then made it known that he would run, but he was considered too conservative by many party leaders, who encouraged Sanford to enter the race in order to defeat Faircloth. Sanford agreed to run, which led Faircloth and another candidate, Judge Marvin K. Blount Jr., to withdraw before filing their candidacies. Six years later, Faircloth did run for the Senate against Sanford, but this time as a Republican.

Sen. East declined to run for a second term, citing his health. Longtime U.S. Representative Jim Broyhill entered the race with much of the establishment support, but David Funderburk had the backing of the organization of Senator Jesse Helms. Funderburk charged Broyhill with being insufficiently conservative, but in the end, Broyhill won the nomination handily in the May primary. The next month, Sen. East committed suicide, and Gov. James G. Martin appointed Broyhill to his seat.

Sanford narrowly defeated incumbent Broyhill on both election ballots, though he received a slightly smaller margin of victory to finish the remainder of East's term due to a lower turnout.

1986 North Carolina U.S. Senate Democratic primary election
| Party | Candidate | Votes | % |
|---|---|---|---|
| Democratic | Terry Sanford | 409,394 | 60.25% |
| Democratic | John Ingram | 111,557 | 16.42% |
| Democratic | Fountain Odom | 49,689 | 7.31% |
| Democratic | William Belk | 33,821 | 4.98% |
| Democratic | Theodore Kinney | 27,228 | 4.01% |
| Democratic | Betty Wallace | 17,001 | 2.50% |
| Democratic | Katherine Harper | 12,998 | 1.91% |
| Democratic | Walt Atkins | 8,306 | 1.22% |
| Democratic | Others | 9,493 | 1.40% |
| Turnout | | 679,487 | |

1986 North Carolina U.S. Senate Republican primary election
| Party | Candidate | Votes | % |
|---|---|---|---|
| Republican | Jim Broyhill (incumbent) | 139,570 | 66.52% |
| Republican | David Funderburk | 63,593 | 30.31% |
| Republican | Frazier Glenn Miller Jr. | 6,662 | 3.18% |
| Turnout | | 148,574 | |

1986 North Carolina U.S. Senate election
| Party | Candidate | Votes | % | ±% |
|---|---|---|---|---|
| Democratic | Terry Sanford | 823,662 | 51.76% | +2.38% |
| Republican | Jim Broyhill (Incumbent) | 767,668 | 48.24% | −1.72% |
| Majority | | 55,994 | 3.54% | |
| Turnout | | 1,591,330 | | |
| Democratic gain from Republican | | Swing | | |

=== North Carolina (special) ===
North Carolina special election
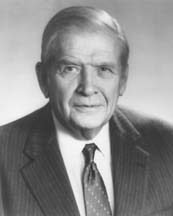

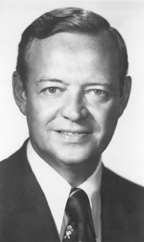
| Nominee | Terry Sanford | Jim Broyhill |
| Party | Democratic | Republican |
| Popular vote | 780,967 | 753,881 |
| Percentage | 50.88% | 49.12% |
- County results Sanford: 50–60% 60–70% 70–80% Broyhill: 50–60% 60–70% 70–80%
U.S. senator before election
Jim Broyhill
Republican
Elected U.S. Senator
Terry Sanford
Democratic

This was a special election for what little remained of the 99th United States Congress (November 1986 – January 1987), being held contemporaneously with a regular election for a new six-year term (beginning in January 1987).

1986 North Carolina U.S. Senate election – Special election
| Party | Candidate | Votes | % |
|---|---|---|---|
| Democratic | Terry Sanford | 780,967 | 50.88% |
| Republican | Jim Broyhill (Incumbent) | 753,881 | 49.12% |
| Majority | | 27,086 | 1.76% |
| Turnout | | 1,534,875 | |
| Democratic gain from Republican | | | |

== North Dakota ==
North Dakota election
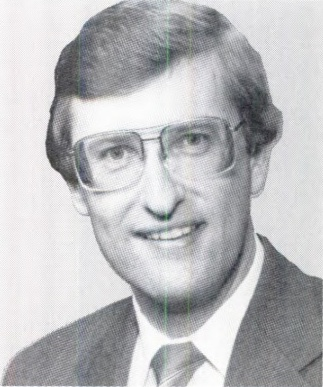

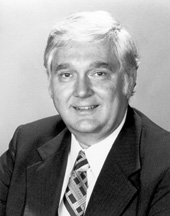
| Nominee | Kent Conrad | Mark Andrews |
| Party | Democratic | Republican |
| Popular vote | 143,932 | 141,812 |
| Percentage | 49.8% | 49.1% |
- County results Conrad: 40–50% 50–60% 60–70% Andrews: 40–50% 50–60%
U.S. senator before election
Mark Andrews
Republican
Elected U.S. Senator
Kent Conrad
Democratic

Incumbent Republican U.S. Senator Mark Andrews lost re-election to a second term to Dem-NPL nominee Kent Conrad, State Tax Commissioner. Andrews lost re-election by just over 2,000 votes after a rigorous campaign involving personal attacks.

General election results
| Party | Candidate | Votes | % |
|---|---|---|---|
| Democratic | Kent Conrad | 143,932 | 49.80% |
| Republican | Mark Andrews (Incumbent) | 141,812 | 49.07% |
| Independent | Anna B. Bourgois | 3,269 | 1.13% |
| Majority | | | |
| Turnout | | 289,013 | |
| Democratic gain from Republican | | | |

== Ohio ==
Ohio election
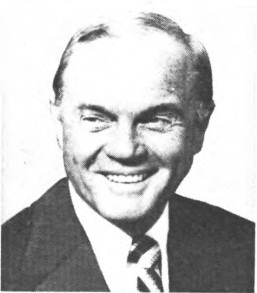

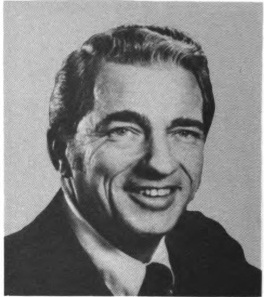
| Nominee | John Glenn | Tom Kindness |
| Party | Democratic | Republican |
| Popular vote | 1,949,208 | 1,171,893 |
| Percentage | 62.5% | 37.6% |
- County results Glenn: 50–60% 60–70% 70–80% Kindness: 50–60% 60–70%
U.S. senator before election
John Glenn
Democratic
Elected U.S. Senator
John Glenn
Democratic

Incumbent Democratic U.S. Senator John Glenn won re-election to a third term over Republican U.S. Congressman Tom Kindness.

1986 OhioUnited States Senate election
| Party | Candidate | Votes | % |
|---|---|---|---|
| Democratic | John Glenn (Incumbent) | 1,949,208 | 62.5% |
| Republican | Tom Kindness | 1,171,893 | 37.6% |
| Independent | Kathleen M. Button | 59 | 0.0% |
| Independent | William M. Harris | 29 | 0.0% |
| Majority | | 777,315 | 24.1% |
| Turnout | | 3,121,189 | |
| Democratic hold | | | |

== Oklahoma ==
Oklahoma election
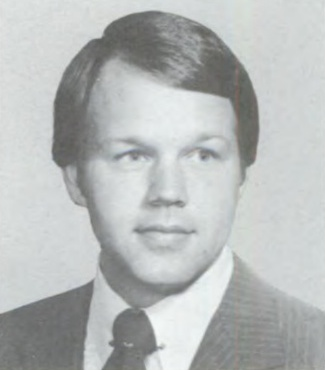

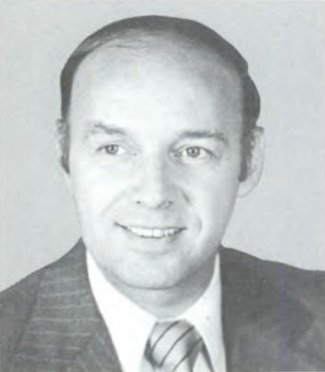
| Nominee | Don Nickles | James R. Jones |
| Party | Republican | Democratic |
| Popular vote | 493,436 | 400,230 |
| Percentage | 55.2% | 44.8% |
- County results Nickles: 50-60% 60-70% 70-80% Jones: 50–60% 60–70%
U.S. senator before election
Don Nickles
Republican
Elected U.S. Senator
Don Nickles
Republican

Incumbent Republican Don Nickles won re-election to his second term, over Democratic U.S. Congressman James R. Jones, who defeated James Gentry in the primary.

OK U.S. Senate election, 1986 Senate election
| Party | Candidate | Votes | % |
|---|---|---|---|
| Republican | Don Nickles (Incumbent) | 493,436 | 55.2% |
| Democratic | James R. Jones | 400,230 | 44.8% |
| Majority | | 93,206 | 10.4% |
| Turnout | | 893,666 | |
| Republican hold | | | |

== Oregon ==
Oregon election
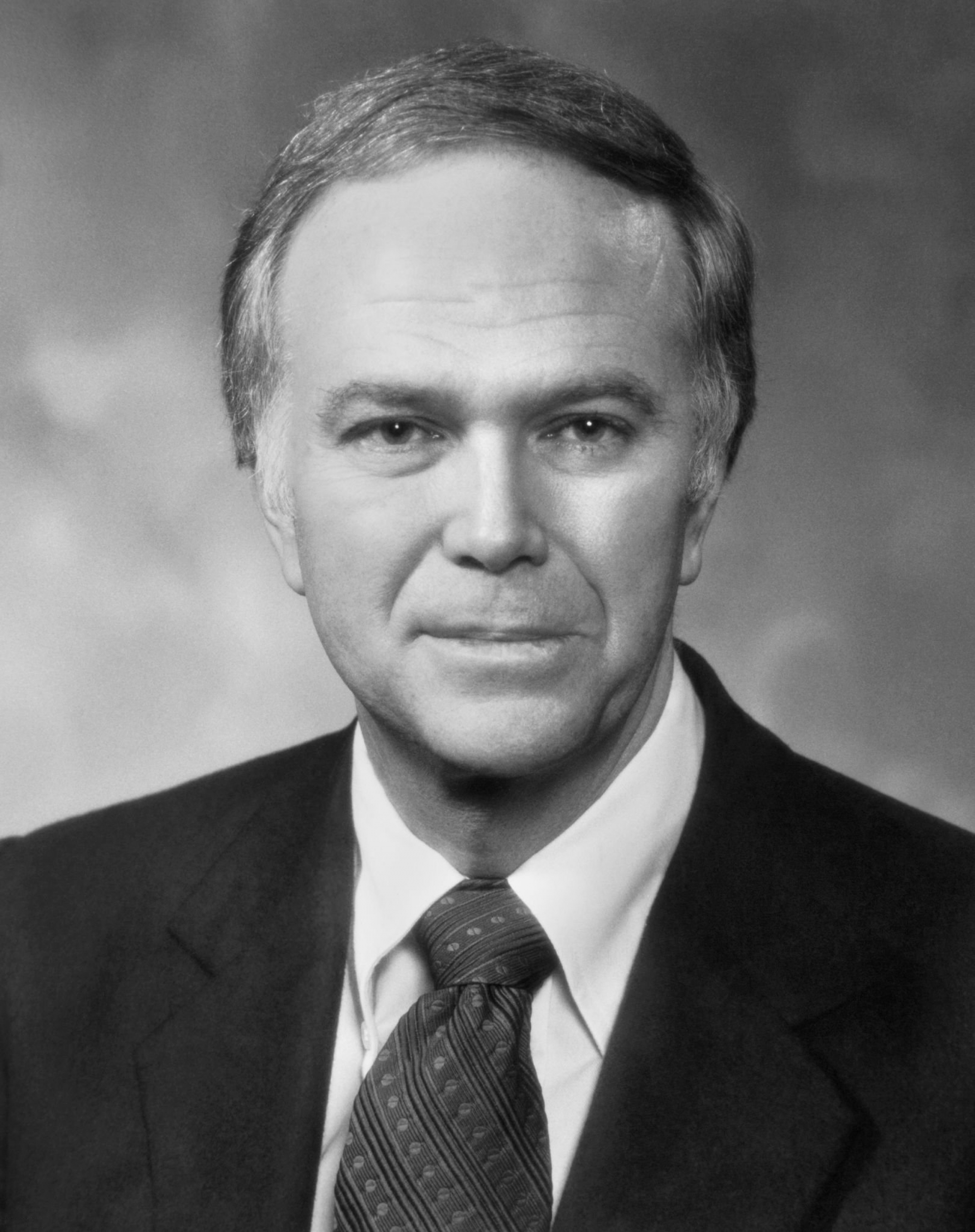

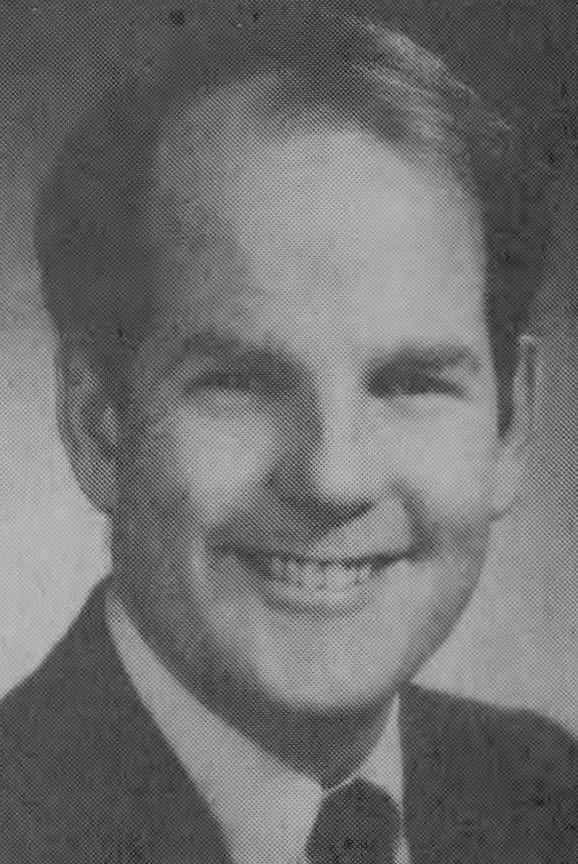
| Nominee | Bob Packwood | Rick Bauman |
| Party | Republican | Democratic |
| Popular vote | 656,317 | 375,735 |
| Percentage | 63.5% | 36.5% |
- County results Packwood: 40-50% 50-60% 60-70% 70-80% Bauman: 50–60% 70–80%
U.S. senator before election
Bob Packwood
Republican
Elected U.S. Senator
Bob Packwood
Republican

Incumbent Bob Packwood ran for re-election, though he faced a significant primary challenge from Joe Lutz. U.S. Congressman Jim Weaver received the Democratic nomination. A populist Democratic congressman from Eugene, Oregon, he was a darling of the environmentalists. Weaver supported the Oregon Wilderness Act of 1984. Packwood was confident despite the popular opponent, because had more money and a better campaign organization. After winning the party nomination, Weaver was the subject of a House Ethics Committee probe into his campaign finances, and withdrew his candidacy. Rick Bauman was selected to replace Weaver on the ballot, and lost handily to Packwood.

Democratic primary for the United States Senate from Oregon, 1986
| Party | Candidate | Votes | % |
|---|---|---|---|
| Democratic | Jim Weaver | 183,334 | 61.56% |
| Democratic | Rod Monroe | 44,553 | 14.96% |
| Democratic | Rick Bauman | 41,939 | 14.08% |
| Democratic | Steve Anderson | 26,130 | 8.77% |
| Democratic | miscellaneous | 1,868 | 0.63% |
| Total votes | | 297,824 | 100.00% |

Republican primary for the United States Senate from Oregon, 1986
| Party | Candidate | Votes | % |
|---|---|---|---|
| Republican | Bob Packwood (incumbent) | 171,985 | 57.62% |
| Republican | Joe Lutz | 126,315 | 42.32% |
| Republican | miscellaneous | 166 | 0.06% |
| Total votes | | 298,466 | 100.00% |

1986 United States Senate election in Oregon
| Party | Candidate | Votes | % |
|---|---|---|---|
| Republican | Bob Packwood (Incumbent) | 656,317 | 62.95% |
| Democratic | Rick Bauman | 375,735 | 36.04% |
| Independent | Write-in | 10,503 | 1.01% |
| Majority | | 280,582 | 26.91% |
| Total votes | | 1,042,555 | 100.00% |
| Republican hold | | | |

== Pennsylvania ==
Pennsylvania election
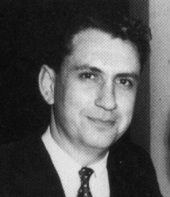

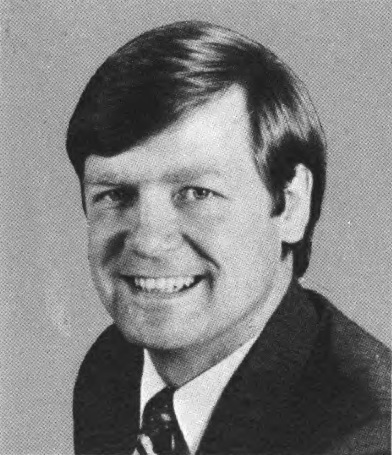
| Nominee | Arlen Specter | Bob Edgar |
| Party | Republican | Democratic |
| Popular vote | 1,906,537 | 1,448,219 |
| Percentage | 56.4% | 42.9% |
- County results Specter: 50–60% 60–70% 70–80% Edgar: 40–50% 50–60%
U.S. senator before election
Arlen Specter
Republican
Elected U.S. Senator
Arlen Specter
Republican

Incumbent Republican Arlen Specter, who had been elected in 1980, ran for re-election and faced Democrat Robert W. Edgar in the general election.

Specter was viewed somewhat tepidly by the Pennsylvania electorate entering the race, although both men shared similar moderate profiles. Additionally, economic woes had dragged down the popularity of Republican candidates in the industrial states. Don Bailey, the state's incumbent Auditor General, who projected a strong blue collar image and had moderate positions that were often relatively close to Specter's, and Edgar, a Methodist minister and sitting Congressman, who had more liberal viewpoints and was with the Vietnam War-era peace movement and anti-corruption movement following the Watergate scandals, ran for the Democratic nomination. However, issues played a very minor role in the primary, which instead showcased the state's geographical divide, with Delaware County-based Edgar narrowly defeating Westmoreland County-based Bailey.

Specter defeated Edgar in the general election by nearly 13% of the vote.

General election results
| Party | Candidate | Votes | % |
|---|---|---|---|
| Republican | Arlen Specter (Incumbent) | 1,906,537 | 56.4% |
| Democratic | Robert W. Edgar | 1,448,219 | 42.9% |
| Independent | Lance S. Haver | 23,470 | 0.7% |
| Majority | | 458,318 | 13.5% |
| Turnout | | 3,378,226 | |
| Republican hold | | | |

== South Carolina ==
South Carolina election
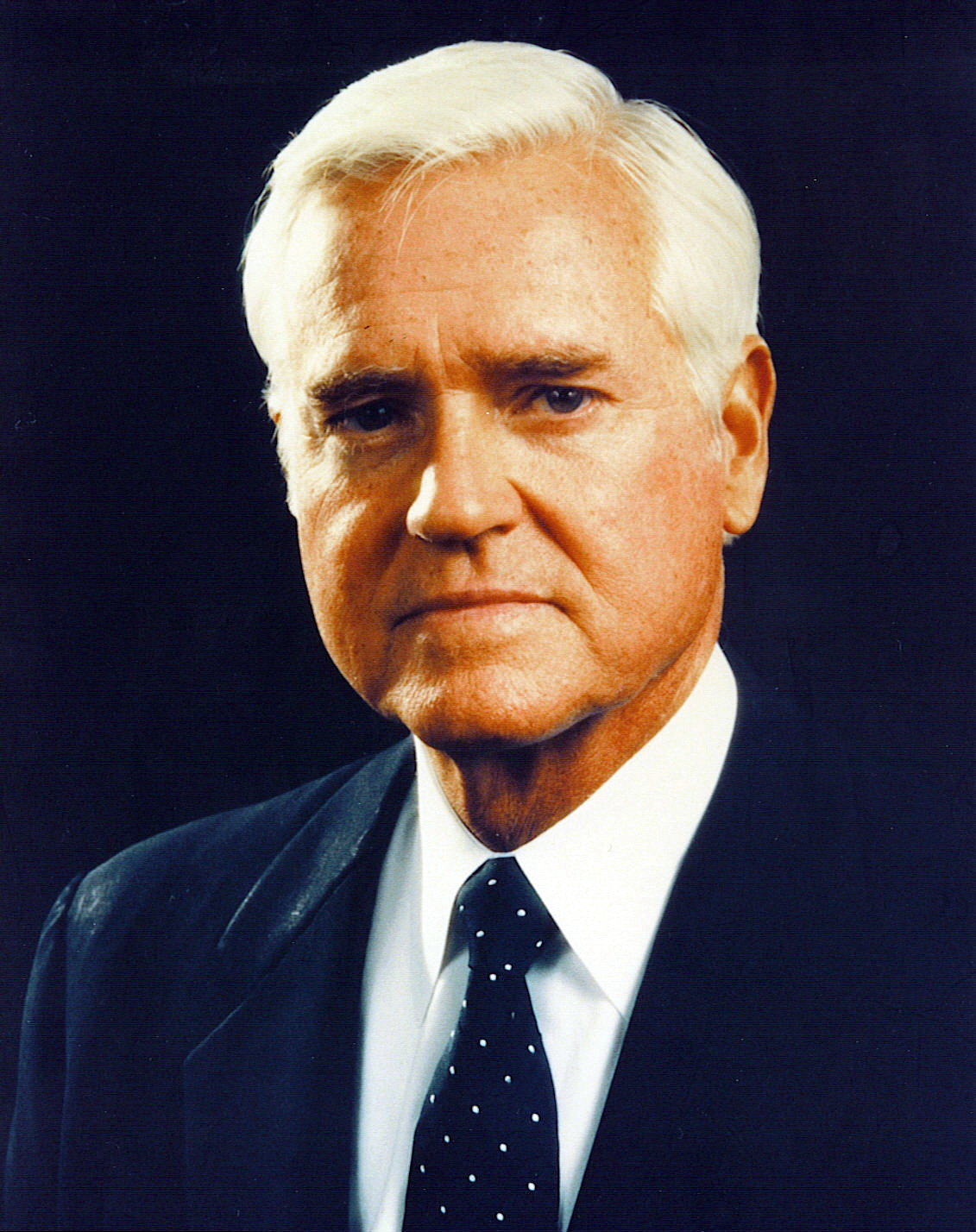

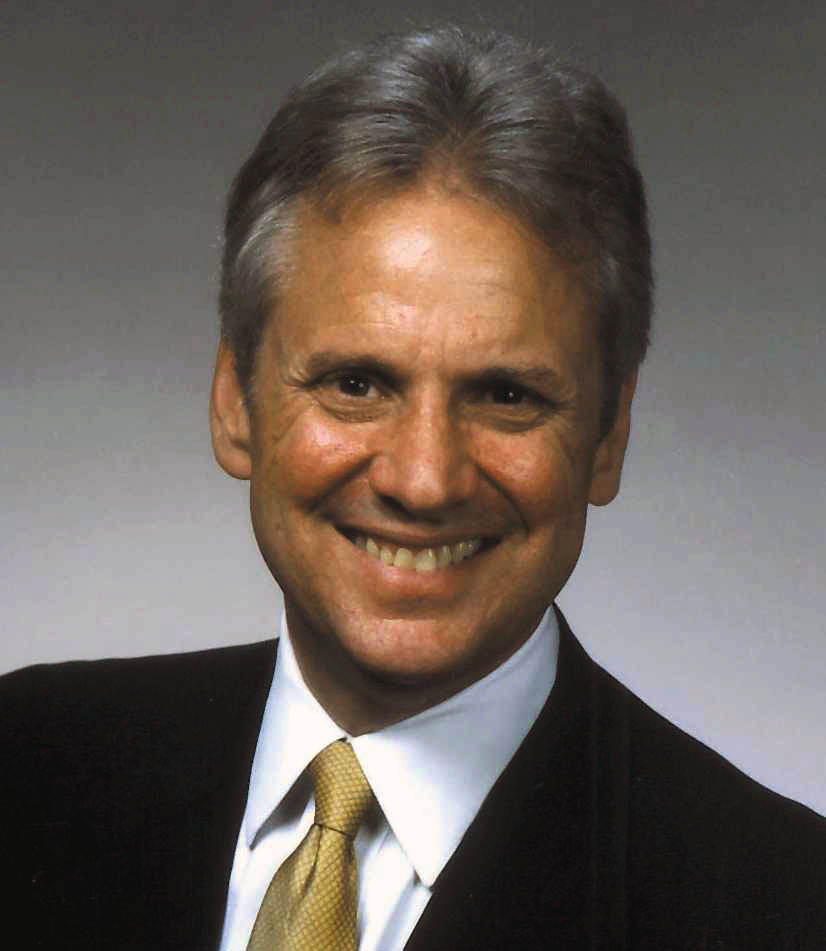
| Nominee | Ernest Hollings | Henry McMaster |
| Party | Democratic | Republican |
| Popular vote | 463,354 | 261,394 |
| Percentage | 63.10% | 35.60% |
- County results Hollings: 50–60% 60–70% 70–80% 80–90% McMaster: 50–60%
U.S. senator before election
Ernest Hollings
Democratic
Elected U.S. Senator
Ernest Hollings
Democratic

Popular incumbent Democratic Senator Fritz Hollings easily defeated Republican U.S. Attorney and future Governor Henry McMaster, who defeated Henry Jordan for the Republican nomination, to win his fifth (his fourth full) term.

South Carolina Republican primary
| Party | Candidate | Votes | % | ±% |
|---|---|---|---|---|
| Republican | Henry McMaster | 27,695 | 53.4% | |
| Republican | Henry Jordan | 24,164 | 46.6% | |

The race was not seriously contested and was not a target by the Republicans. With little financial assistance, McMaster was unable to mount a credible challenge to Hollings's re-election in what became a difficult year for Republicans.

South Carolina election
| Party | Candidate | Votes | % | ±% |
|---|---|---|---|---|
| Democratic | Fritz Hollings (Incumbent) | 465,511 | 63.1% | −7.3% |
| Republican | Henry McMaster | 262,976 | 35.6% | +6.0% |
| Libertarian | Steven B. Vandervelde | 4,788 | 0.7% | +0.7% |
| American | Ray Hillyard | 4,588 | 0.6% | +0.6% |
| No party | Write-Ins | 199 | 0.0% | 0.0% |
| Majority | | 202,535 | 27.5% | −13.3% |
| Turnout | | 738,062 | 56.6% | −13.9% |
| Democratic hold | | Swing | | |

== South Dakota ==
South Dakota election
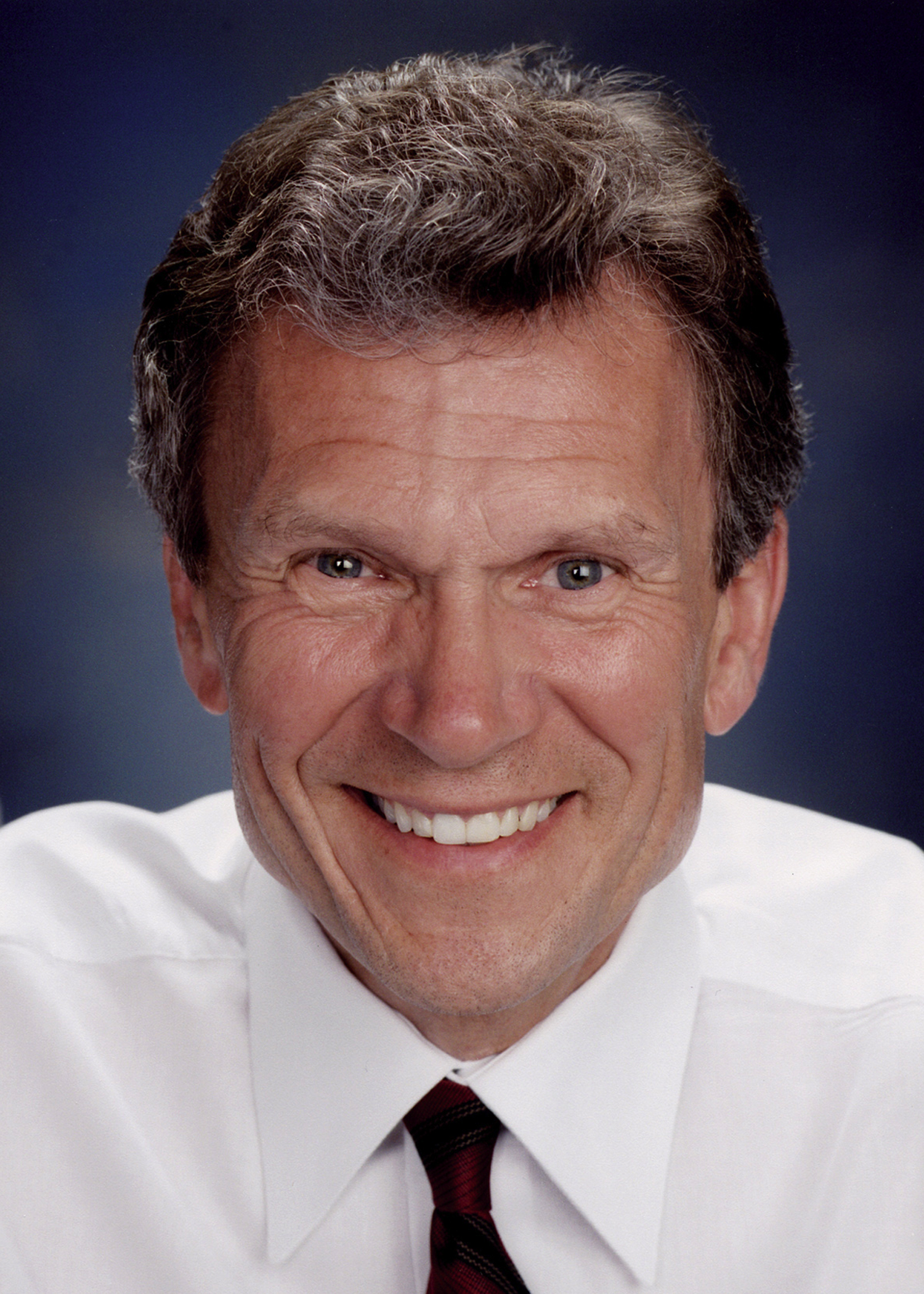

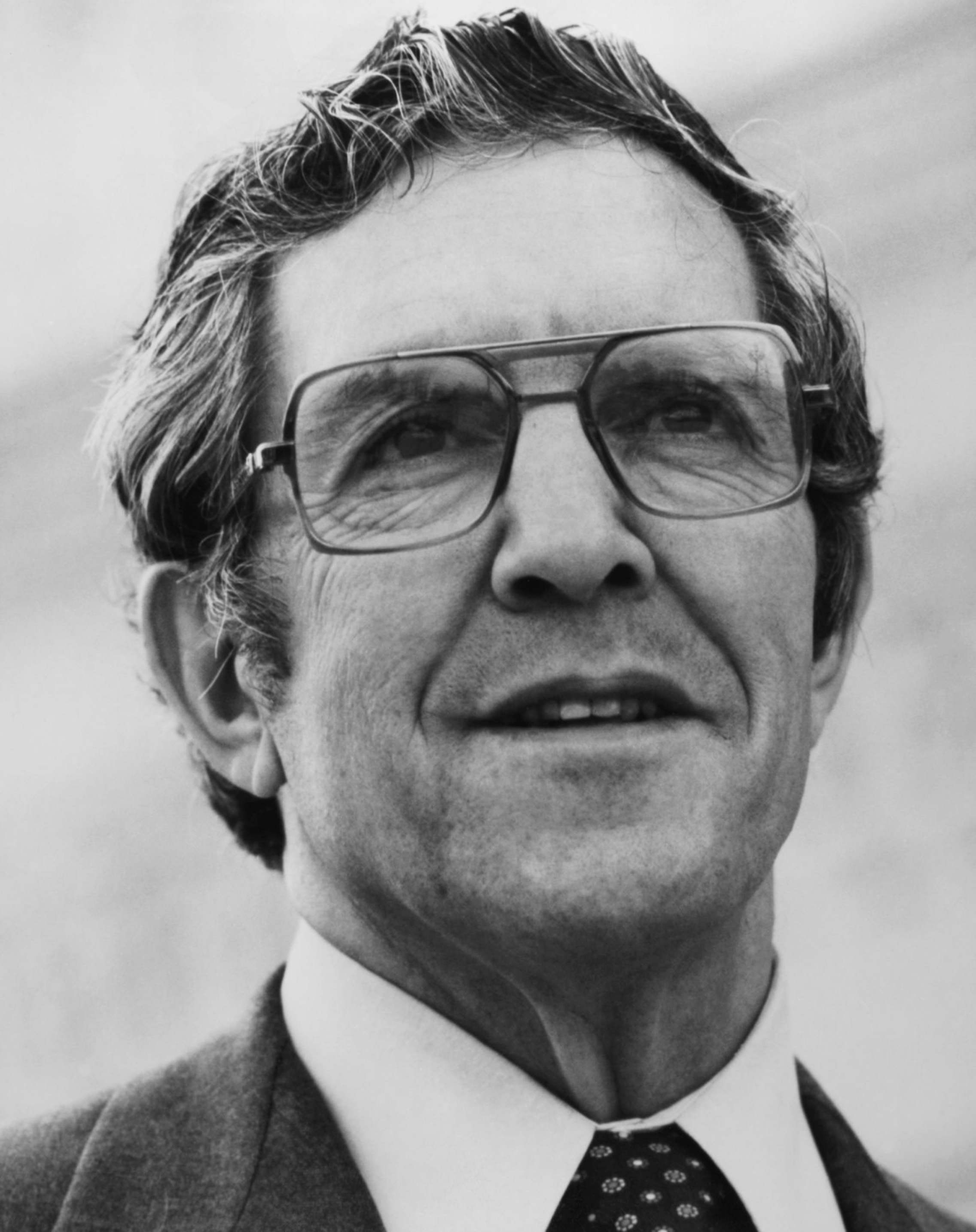
| Nominee | Tom Daschle | James Abdnor |
| Party | Democratic | Republican |
| Popular vote | 152,657 | 143,173 |
| Percentage | 51.6% | 48.4% |
- County results Daschle: 50–60% 60–70% 70–80% 80–90% Abdnor: 50–60% 60–70% 70–80%
U.S. senator before election
James Abdnor
Republican
Elected U.S. Senator
Tom Daschle
Democratic

Incumbent Republican James Abdnor ran for re-election to a second term, but was defeated by Democratic Congressman Tom Daschle.

Daschle was uncontested for the Democratic nomination and therefore was able to focus on the general election early, while Abdnor had to fight a challenge from an incumbent governor, Bill Janklow.

Republican primary results
| Party | Candidate | Votes | % |
|---|---|---|---|
| Republican | James Abdnor (Incumbent) | 63,414 | 54.51% |
| Republican | Bill Janklow | 52,924 | 45.49% |
| Total votes | | 116,338 | 100.00% |

General election results
| Party | Candidate | Votes | % | ±% |
|---|---|---|---|---|
| Democratic | Tom Daschle | 152,657 | 51.60% | +12.21% |
| Republican | James Abdnor (Incumbent) | 143,173 | 48.40% | −9.80% |
| Majority | | 9,484 | 3.21% | −15.60% |
| Turnout | | 295,830 | | |
| Democratic gain from Republican | | Swing | | |

== Utah ==
Utah election
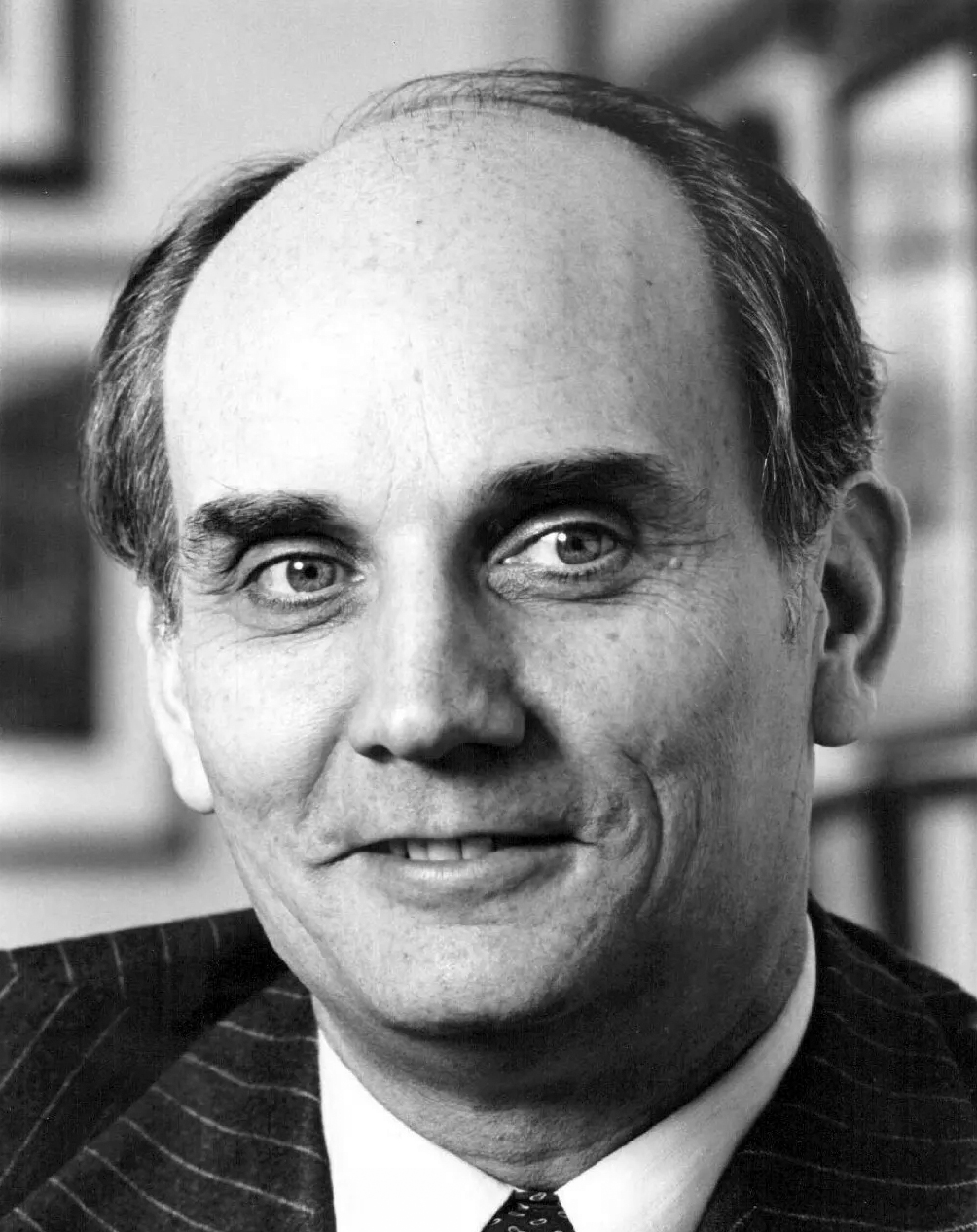

| Nominee | Jake Garn | Craig S. Oliver |
| Party | Republican | Democratic |
| Popular vote | 314,608 | 115,523 |
| Percentage | 72.31% | 26.55% |
- County results Garn: 60–70% 70–80% 80–90% Oliver: 50–60%
U.S. senator before election
Jake Garn
Republican
Elected U.S. Senator
Jake Garn
Republican

Republican Jake Garn, originally elected in 1974, ran for re-election to a third term. He faced nominal opposition from Democrat Craig S. Oliver in the general election, defeating him 72%-27%.

1986 United States Senate election in Utah
| Party | Candidate | Votes | % | ±% |
|---|---|---|---|---|
| Republican | Jake Garn (Incumbent) | 314,608 | 72.31% | |
| Democratic | Craig S. Oliver (D) | 115,523 | 26.55% | |
| Libertarian | Hugh A. Butler (L) | 3,023 | 0.69% | |
| Socialist Workers | Mary Zins | 1,863 | 0.43% | |
| None | Write-Ins | 94 | 0.02% | |
| Majority | | 199,085 | 45.76% | |
| Turnout | | 435,111 | | |
| Republican hold | | Swing | | |

== Vermont ==
Vermont election
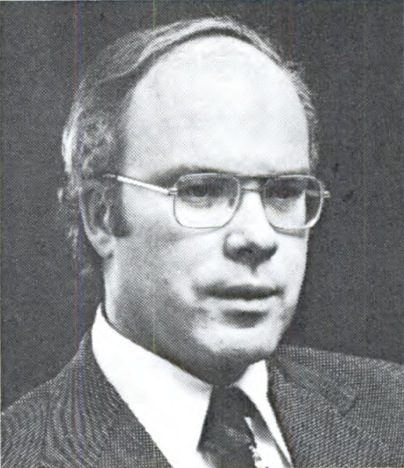

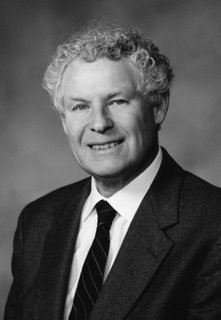
| Nominee | Patrick Leahy | Richard A. Snelling |
| Party | Democratic | Republican |
| Popular vote | 124,123 | 67,798 |
| Percentage | 63.2% | 34.5% |
- Leahy: 40-50% 50-60% 60-70% 70-80% Snelling: 40-50% 50-60% 60-70%
U.S. senator before election
Patrick Leahy
Democratic
Elected U.S. Senator
Patrick Leahy
Democratic

Incumbent Democrat Patrick Leahy won re-election to a third term over Republican former Governor of Vermont Richard A. Snelling and Liberty Unionist sociologist and perennial candidate Jerry Levy. The race was initially expected to be competitive, with Ronald Reagan encouraging Snelling to run.

Both Leahy and Snelling were well-respected and highly popular in Vermont, and the general feeling was that they would both make good senators. However, Snelling was felt to be at a disadvantage for several reasons, including the fact that his main campaign plank was deficit reduction, which The Caledonian-Record noted Leahy was already a well-known advocate for, and the fact that Leahy had acquired a reputation as one of the Senate's most knowledgeable figures on the issue of nuclear proliferation, an issue which the Brattleboro Reformer noted that Snelling had no experience with.

Nonetheless, Leahy defeated Snelling in a 63%-35% landslide. Leahy would face one more tough re-election challenge in 1992 against Republican Jim Douglas, handily winning each term thereafter.

Democratic primary results
| Party | Candidate | Votes | % |
|---|---|---|---|
| Democratic | Patrick Leahy (inc.) | 21,255 | 97.63% |
| Democratic | Write-ins | 516 | 2.37% |
| Total votes | | 21,771 | 100.00% |

Liberty Union primary results
| Party | Candidate | Votes | % |
|---|---|---|---|
| Liberty Union | Jerry Levy | 147 | 93.04% |
| Liberty Union | Write-ins | 11 | 6.96% |
| Total votes | | 158 | 100.00% |

Republican primary results
| Party | Candidate | Votes | % |
|---|---|---|---|
| Republican | Richard A. Snelling | 21,477 | 75.11% |
| Republican | Anthony N. Doria | 6,493 | 22.71% |
| Republican | Write-ins | 625 | 2.19% |
| Total votes | | 28,595 | 100.00% |

General election results
| Party | Candidate | Votes | % | ±% |
|---|---|---|---|---|
| Democratic | Patrick Leahy (Incumbent) | 124,123 | 63.16% | +13.34% |
| Republican | Richard A. Snelling | 67,798 | 34.50% | −14.00% |
| Conservative Party (US) | Anthony N. Doria | 2,963 | 1.51% | |
| Liberty Union | Jerry Levy | 1,583 | 0.81% | |
| Write-ins | | 65 | 0.02% | |
| Majority | | 56,325 | 28.66% | +27.34% |
| Turnout | | 196,532 | | |
| Democratic hold | | Swing | | |

== Washington ==
Washington election
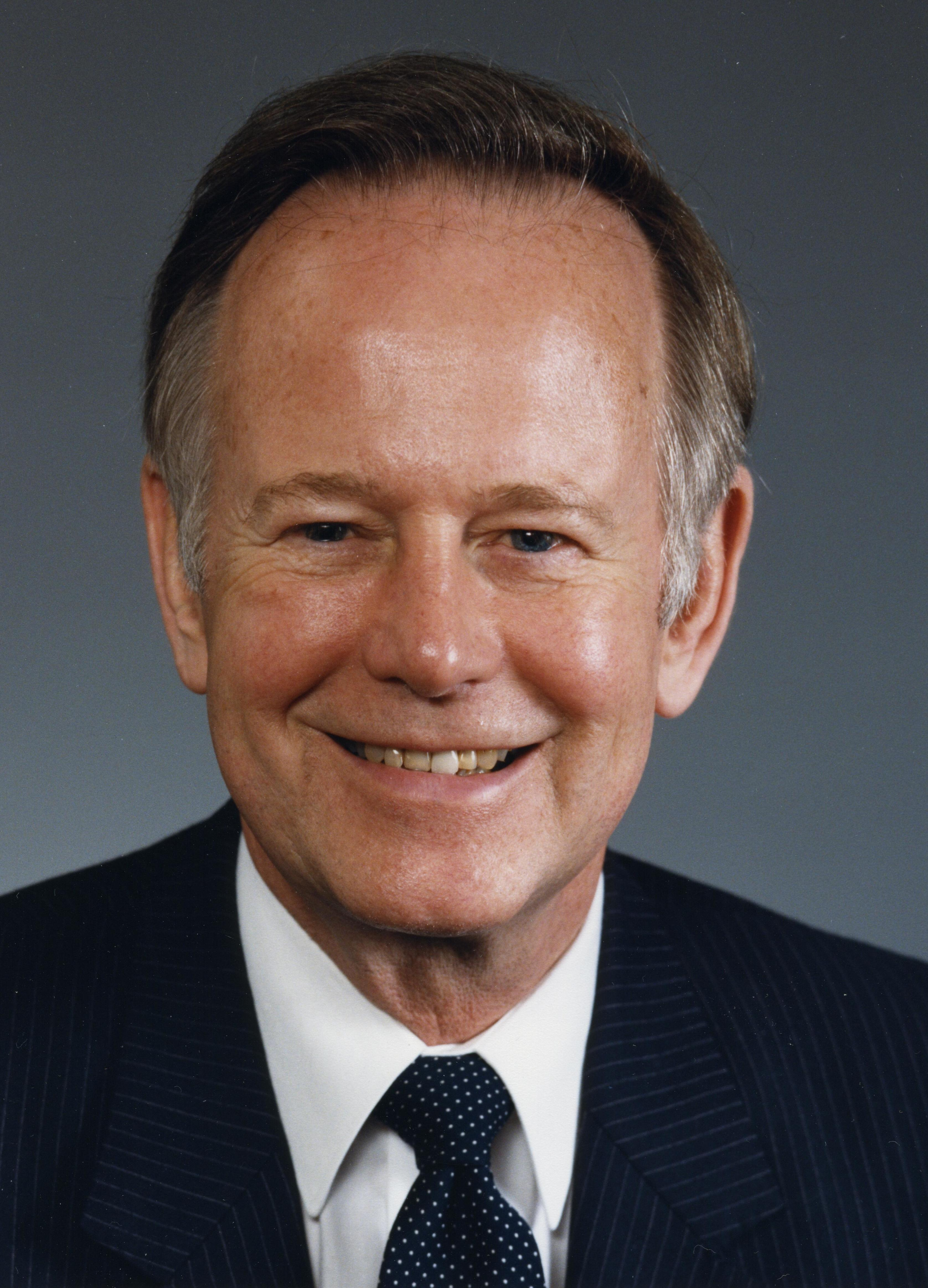

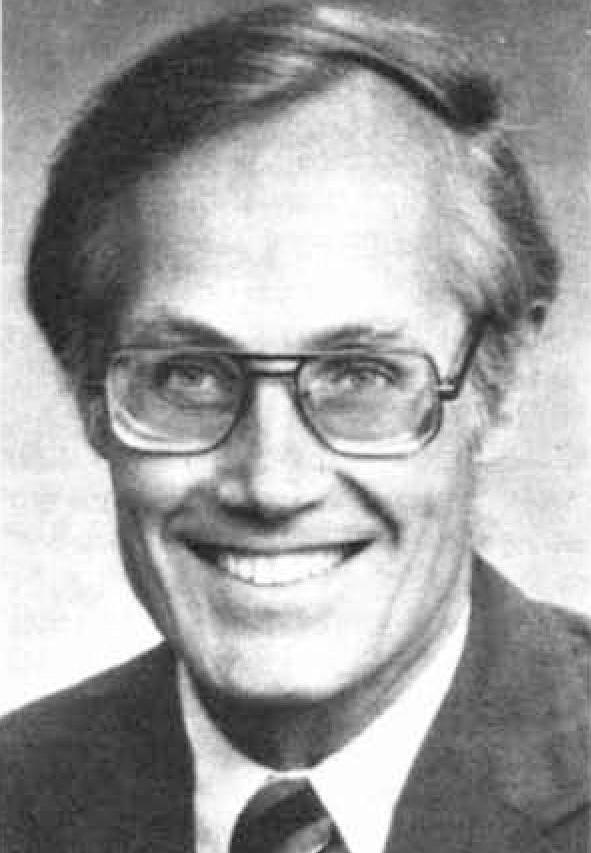
| Nominee | Brock Adams | Slade Gorton |
| Party | Democratic | Republican |
| Popular vote | 677,471 | 650,931 |
| Percentage | 50.7% | 48.7% |
- County results Adams: 40–50% 50–60% 60–70% 70–80% Gorton: 40–50% 50–60% 60–70%
U.S. senator before election
Slade Gorton
Republican
Elected U.S. Senator
Brock Adams
Democratic

Incumbent Republican Senator Slade Gorton lost re-election to former Transportation Secretary Brock Adams. Gorton later won Washington's other Senate seat in 1988 and 1994 before losing re-election again in 2000.

1986 United States Senate election in Washington
| Party | Candidate | Votes | % |
|---|---|---|---|
| Democratic | Brock Adams | 677,471 | 50.66% |
| Republican | Slade Gorton (Incumbent) | 650,931 | 48.67% |
| Socialist Workers | Jill Fein | 8,965 | 0.67% |
| Majority | | 26,540 | 1.99% |
| Turnout | | 1,337,367 | |
| Democratic gain from Republican | | | |

== Wisconsin ==
Wisconsin election
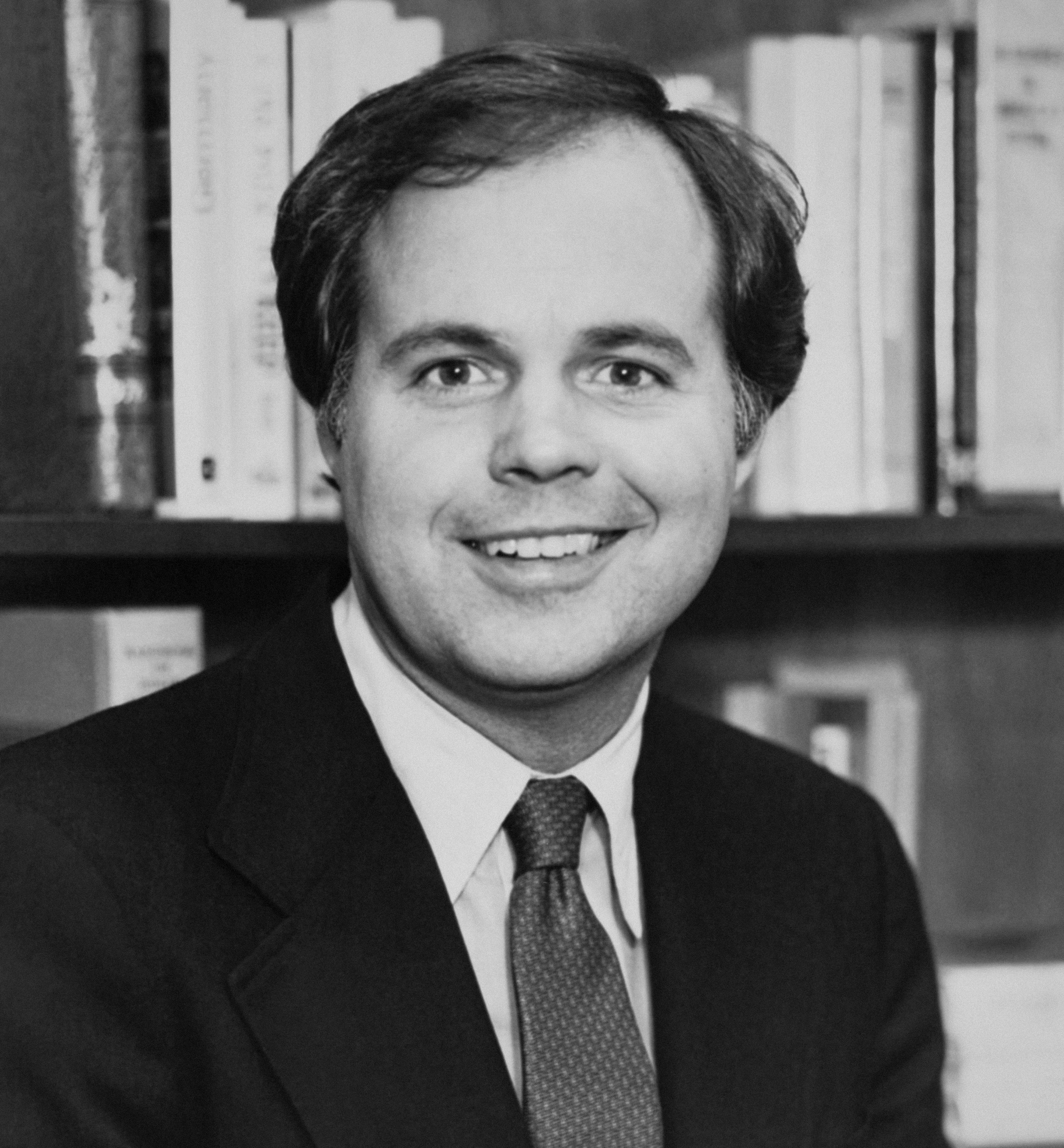

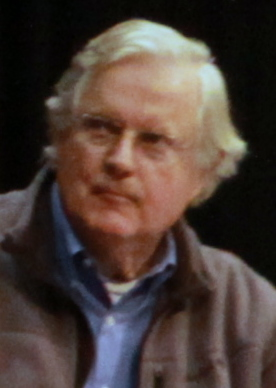
| Nominee | Bob Kasten | Ed Garvey |
| Party | Republican | Democratic |
| Popular vote | 754,573 | 702,963 |
| Percentage | 50.9% | 47.4% |
- County results Kasten: 50–60% 60–70% Garvey: 50–60%
U.S. senator before election
Bob Kasten
Republican
Elected U.S. Senator
Bob Kasten
Republican

Incumbent Republican Bob Kasten ran unopposed in the Republican primary. Ed Garvey, former Deputy Attorney General of Wisconsin and executive director of the NFLPA, defeated Matt Flynn in the Democratic primary. Kasten defeated Garvey in the general election by just over 3%.

General election results
| Party | Candidate | Votes | % |
|---|---|---|---|
| Republican | Bob Kasten (Incumbent) | 754,573 | 50.9% |
| Democratic | Ed Garvey | 702,963 | 47.4% |
| Majority | | 51,610 | 3.5% |
| Turnout | | 1,457,536 | |
| Republican hold | | | |

== See also ==
- 1986 United States elections
  - 1986 United States gubernatorial elections
  - 1986 United States House of Representatives elections
- 99th United States Congress
- 100th United States Congress
