= 1980 United States Senate elections =

- November 4, 1980
- Class 3

34 of the 100 seats in the United States Senate 51 seats needed for a majority
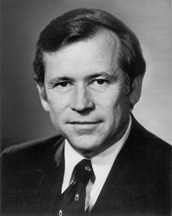

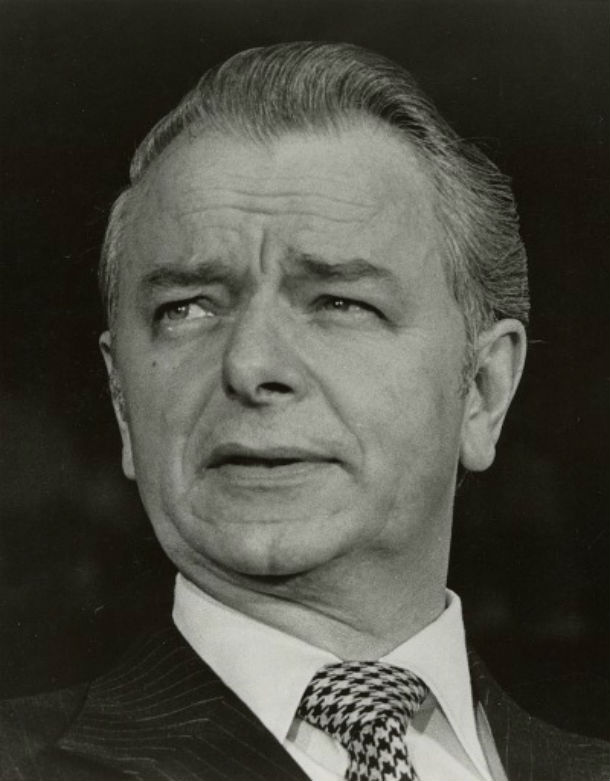
	Majority party	Minority party
Leader	Howard Baker	Robert Byrd
Party	Republican	Democratic
Leader since	March 5, 1980	January 3, 1977
Leader's seat	Tennessee	West Virginia
Seats before	41	58
Seats after	53	46
Seat change	▲12	▼12
Popular vote	26,597,169	30,699,463
Percentage	44.7%	51.6%
Seats up	10	24
Races won	22	12
	Third party
Party	Independent
Seats before	1 (Note: Harry F. Byrd Jr. (VA) was an independent who caucused with the Democrats. In some circles he is called an "Independent Democrat," but his actual registration was listed as "Independent." See, e.g., United States Congress. "Harry Flood Byrd, Jr. (id: B001209)". Biographical Directory of the United States Congress.)
Seats after	1
Seat change	Steady
Seats up	0
Races won	0
- Results of the elections: Republican gain Democratic hold Republican hold No election
Majority Leader before election
Robert Byrd
Democratic
Elected Majority Leader
Howard Baker
Republican

The 1980 United States Senate elections were held on November 4, coinciding with Ronald Reagan's victory in the presidential election. The 34 Senate seats of Class 3 were contested in regular elections. Reagan's large margin of victory over incumbent Jimmy Carter gave a huge boost to Republican Senate candidates, allowing them to flip 12 Democratic seats and win control of the chamber for the first time since the end of the 83rd Congress in January 1955. This was the first time since 1966 that any party successfully defended all their own seats.

This is one of only five occasions where ten or more Senate seats changed hands in an election, with the others being in 1920, 1932, 1946, and 1958. This is the earliest Senate election with a senator who is still serving, that being Chuck Grassley of Iowa.

This was the largest Senate swing since 1958 and the largest Republican gain since 1946, when the Republicans also picked up 12 seats. This was also the last time the Senate changed hands in a presidential election year until 2020 when Democrats won control, the last time the Republicans gained control of the Senate in a presidential election year until 2024, the last time Maryland elected a Republican to the Senate, and the last time where the Republicans made net gains in three or more election cycles in a row, having last experienced net losses in the Senate in 1974 (which also involved the Class 3 Senate seats).

== Results summary ==
↓
46	1	53
Democratic	I	Republican

Parties						Total
Parties	Democratic	Republican	Independent	Libertarian	Other	Total
Last elections (1978) Before these elections	58	41	1	0	0	100
Not up	34	31	1	0	0	66
Up Class 3 (1974→1980)	24	10	0	—	—	34
Incumbent retired	2	3	—	—	—	5
Held by same party	2	3	—	—	—	5
Replaced by other party	0	0	—	—	—	0
Result	2	3	—	—	—	5
Incumbent ran	22 (Note: Includes three incumbent senators Donald W. Stewart, Mike Gravel, and Richard Stone had lost renomination and replaced with new nominees from the same party.)	7 (Note: Jacob Javits lost renomination to represent New York and Al D'Amato became the party's new nominee. Therefore, Javits ran as a Liberal candidate.)	—	—	—	29
Won re-election	10	6	—	—	—	16
Lost re-election	▼9 Democrats replaced by ▲9 Republicans		—	—	—	9
Lost renomination, but held by same party	0	1	—	—	—	1
Lost renomination, and party lost	▼3 Democrats replaced by ▲3 Republicans		—	—	—	3
Result	10	19	0	—	—	29
Total elected	12	22	0	0	0	34
Net gain/loss	▼12	▲12	Steady	Steady	Steady	12
Nationwide vote	30,699,463	26,597,169 (Note: The Conservative Party and Right to Life Party in New York endorsed Al D'Amato, but the Clerk of the U.S. House of Representatives did not tabulate their votes, totaling 427,570, into the national Republican total.)	112,242	401,077	1,658,979	59,468,930
Share	51.62%	44.73%	0.19%	0.67%	2.79%	100%
Result	46	53	1	0	0	100

Source: Office of the Clerk

== Change in composition ==
=== Before the elections ===
D_{1}	D_{2}	D_{3}	D_{4}	D_{5}	D_{6}	D_{7}	D_{8}	D_{9}	D_{10}
D_{20}	D_{19}	D_{18}	D_{17}	D_{16}	D_{15}	D_{14}	D_{13}	D_{12}	D_{11}
D_{21}	D_{22}	D_{23}	D_{24}	D_{25}	D_{26}	D_{27}	D_{28}	D_{29}	D_{30}
D_{40} Conn. Retired	D_{39} Colo. Ran	D_{38} Calif. Ran	D_{37} Ark. Ran	D_{36} Alaska; Ran	D_{35} Ala. Ran	D_{34}	D_{33}	D_{32}	D_{31}
D_{41} Fla. Ran	D_{42} Ga. Ran	D_{43} Hawaii; Ran	D_{44} Idaho; Ran	D_{45} Ill. Retired	D_{46} Ind. Ran	D_{47} Iowa; Ran	D_{48} Ky. Ran	D_{49} La. Ran	D_{50} Mo. Ran
Majority →									D_{51} N.H. Ran
R_{41} Utah; Ran	I_{1}	D_{58} Wisc. Ran	D_{57} Wash. Ran	D_{56} Vt. Ran	D_{55} S.D. Ran	D_{54} S.C. Ran	D_{53} Ohio; Ran	D_{52} N.C. Ran	D_{51} N.H. Ran
R_{40} Pa. Retired	R_{39} Ore. Ran	R_{38} Okla. Retired	R_{37} N.D. Retired	R_{36} N.Y. Ran	R_{35} Nev. Ran	R_{34} Md. Ran	R_{33} Kan. Ran	R_{32} Ariz. Ran	R_{31}
R_{21}	R_{22}	R_{23}	R_{24}	R_{25}	R_{26}	R_{27}	R_{28}	R_{29}	R_{30}
R_{20}	R_{19}	R_{18}	R_{17}	R_{16}	R_{15}	R_{14}	R_{13}	R_{12}	R_{11}
R_{1}	R_{2}	R_{3}	R_{4}	R_{5}	R_{6}	R_{7}	R_{8}	R_{9}	R_{10}

=== After the elections ===
D_{1}	D_{2}	D_{3}	D_{4}	D_{5}	D_{6}	D_{7}	D_{8}	D_{9}	D_{10}
D_{20}	D_{19}	D_{18}	D_{17}	D_{16}	D_{15}	D_{14}	D_{13}	D_{12}	D_{11}
D_{21}	D_{22}	D_{23}	D_{24}	D_{25}	D_{26}	D_{27}	D_{28}	D_{29}	D_{30}
D_{40} Ill. Hold	D_{39} Hawaii; Re-elected	D_{38} Conn. Hold	D_{37} Colo. Re-elected	D_{36} Calif. Re-elected	D_{35} Ark. Re-elected	D_{34}	D_{33}	D_{32}	D_{31}
D_{41} Ky. Re-elected	D_{42} La. Re-elected	D_{43} Mo. Re-elected	D_{44} Ohio; Re-elected	D_{45} S.C. Re-elected	D_{46} Vt. Re-elected	I_{1}	R_{53} Wisc. Gain	R_{52} Wash. Gain	R_{51} S.D. Gain
Majority →									R_{51} S.D. Gain
R_{41} Utah; Re-elected	R_{42} Ala. Gain	R_{43} Alaska; Gain	R_{44} Fla. Gain	R_{45} Ga. Gain	R_{46} Idaho; Gain	R_{47} Ind. Gain	R_{48} Iowa; Gain	R_{49} N.H. Gain	R_{50} N.C. Gain
R_{40} Pa. Hold	R_{39} Ore. Re-elected	R_{38} Okla. Hold	R_{37} N.D. Hold	R_{36} N.Y. Hold	R_{35} Nev. Re-elected	R_{34} Md. Re-elected	R_{33} Kan. Re-elected	R_{32} Ariz. Re-elected	R_{31}
R_{21}	R_{22}	R_{23}	R_{24}	R_{25}	R_{26}	R_{27}	R_{28}	R_{29}	R_{30}
R_{20}	R_{19}	R_{18}	R_{17}	R_{16}	R_{15}	R_{14}	R_{13}	R_{12}	R_{11}
R_{1}	R_{2}	R_{3}	R_{4}	R_{5}	R_{6}	R_{7}	R_{8}	R_{9}	R_{10}

Key

D_{#}	Democratic
R_{#}	Republican
I_{#}	Independent

== Gains, losses, and holds ==
=== Retirements ===
Map of retirements: Republican incumbent Democratic incumbent Democratic incumbent retired or lost renomination Republican incumbent retired Liberal incumbent (Note: Republican Jacob Javits lost renomination to Al D'Amato, but received the Liberal nomination and ran for re-election under that line.)

Three Republicans and two Democrats retired instead of seeking re-election.

State	Senator	Replaced by
Connecticut	Abraham Ribicoff	Chris Dodd
Illinois	Adlai Stevenson III	Alan J. Dixon
North Dakota	Milton Young	Mark Andrews
Oklahoma	Henry Bellmon	Don Nickles
Pennsylvania	Richard Schweiker	Arlen Specter

=== Defeats ===
One Republican and twelve Democrats sought re-election but lost in the primary or general election.

State	Senator	Replaced by
Alabama	Donald Stewart (lost primary)	Jeremiah Denton
Alaska	Mike Gravel (lost primary)	Frank Murkowski
Florida	Richard Stone (lost primary)	Paula Hawkins
Georgia	Herman Talmadge	Mack Mattingly
Idaho	Frank Church	Steve Symms
Indiana	Birch Bayh	Dan Quayle
Iowa	John Culver	Chuck Grassley
New Hampshire	John A. Durkin	Warren Rudman
New York	Jacob Javits (lost primary)	Al D'Amato
North Carolina	Robert Burren Morgan	John Porter East
South Dakota	George McGovern	James Abdnor
Washington	Warren Magnuson	Slade Gorton
Wisconsin	Gaylord Nelson	Bob Kasten

=== Post-election changes ===
One Democrat resigned on April 12, 1982, and was later replaced by a Republican appointee. In New Jersey, a regular scheduled election was held in the 1982 Senate elections for the Class 1 terms, where Frank Lautenberg won the election to succeed Republican appointee Nicholas F. Brady, who did not seek election.

State	Senator	Replaced by
New Jersey (Class 1)	Harrison A. Williams	Nicholas F. Brady
New Jersey (Class 1)	Nicholas F. Brady	Frank Lautenberg

== Race summary ==
=== Special elections ===
There were no special elections in 1980.

=== Elections leading to the next Congress ===
In these general elections, the winners were elected for the term beginning January 3, 1981; ordered by state.

All of the elections involved the Class 3 seats.

State	Incumbent			Results	Candidates
State	Senator	Party	Electoral history	Results	Candidates
Alabama	Donald Stewart	Democratic	1978 (special)	Incumbent lost renomination. Republican gain. Incumbent resigned January 2, 1981 to give successor advantageous seniority. Winner appointed the same day.	▌ ✓ Jeremiah Denton (Republican) 50.2%; ▌Jim Folsom Jr. (Democratic) 47.1%
Alaska	Mike Gravel	Democratic	1968; 1974	Incumbent lost renomination. Republican gain.	▌ ✓ Frank Murkowski (Republican) 53.7%; ▌Clark Gruening (Democratic) 45.9%
Arizona	Barry Goldwater	Republican	1952; 1958; 1964 (retired); 1968; 1974	Incumbent re-elected.	▌ ✓ Barry Goldwater (Republican) 49.5%; ▌William R. Schulz (Democratic) 48.4%; Others: ▌Fred R. Easer (Libertarian) 1.4%; ▌Lorenzo Torrez (People Over Politics) 0.4%; ▌Josefina Otero (Socialist Workers) 0.4%
Arkansas	Dale Bumpers	Democratic	1974	Incumbent re-elected.	▌ ✓ Dale Bumpers (Democratic) 59.1%; ▌William Clark (Republican) 40.9%
California	Alan Cranston	Democratic	1968; 1974	Incumbent re-elected.	▌ ✓ Alan Cranston (Democratic) 56.5%; ▌Paul Gann (Republican) 37.1%; Others: ▌David Bergland (Libertarian) 2.4%; ▌David Wald (Peace and Freedom) 2.4%; ▌Jim Griffin (American Independent) 1.6%
Colorado	Gary Hart	Democratic	1974	Incumbent re-elected.	▌ ✓ Gary Hart (Democratic) 50.3%; ▌Mary E. Buchanan (Republican) 48.7%; Others: ▌Earl Higgerson (Statesman) 0.6%; ▌Henry John Olshaw (Unaffiliated-American) 0.4%
Connecticut	Abraham Ribicoff	Democratic	1962; 1968; 1974	Incumbent retired. Democratic hold.	▌ ✓ Chris Dodd (Democratic) 56.3%; ▌James L. Buckley (Republican) 42.9%; Others: ▌Jerry Brennan (Libertarian) 0.4%; ▌Andrew J. Zemel (Concerned Citizens) 0.4%
Florida	Richard Stone	Democratic	1974	Incumbent lost renomination. Republican gain. Incumbent resigned December 31, 1980 to give successor preferential seniority. Winner appointed January 1, 1981.	▌ ✓ Paula Hawkins (Republican) 51.7%; ▌Bill Gunter (Democratic) 48.3%
Georgia	Herman Talmadge	Democratic	1956; 1962; 1968; 1974	Incumbent lost re-election. Republican gain.	▌ ✓ Mack Mattingly (Republican) 50.9%; ▌Herman Talmadge (Democratic) 49.1%
Hawaii	Daniel Inouye	Democratic	1962; 1968; 1974	Incumbent re-elected.	▌ ✓ Daniel Inouye (Democratic) 77.9%; ▌Cooper Brown (Republican) 18.4%
Idaho	Frank Church	Democratic	1956; 1962; 1968; 1974	Incumbent lost re-election. Republican gain.	▌ ✓ Steve Symms (Republican) 49.7%; ▌Frank Church (Democratic) 48.8%; ▌Larry Fullmer (Libertarian) 1.5%
Illinois	Adlai Stevenson III	Democratic	1970 (special); 1974	Incumbent retired. Democratic hold.	▌ ✓ Alan J. Dixon (Democratic) 56.0%; ▌Dave O'Neal (Republican) 42.5%; Others: ▌Bruce Green (Libertarian) 0.6%; ▌Sidney Lens (Independent) 0.4%; ▌Charles F. Wilson (Communist) 0.2%; ▌Michael Soriano (Workers World) 0.1%; ▌Burton L. Artz (Socialist Workers) 0.1%
Indiana	Birch Bayh	Democratic	1962; 1968; 1974	Incumbent lost re-election. Republican gain.	▌ ✓ Dan Quayle (Republican) 53.8%; ▌Birch Bayh (Democratic) 46.2%
Iowa	John Culver	Democratic	1974	Incumbent lost re-election. Republican gain.	▌ ✓ Chuck Grassley (Republican) 53.5%; ▌John Culver (Democratic) 45.5%; Others: ▌Garry De Young (Independent) 0.5%; ▌Robert V. Hengerer (Libertarian) 0.3%; ▌John Ingram Henderson (Independent) 0.2%
Kansas	Bob Dole	Republican	1968; 1974	Incumbent re-elected.	▌ ✓ Bob Dole (Republican) 63.8%; ▌John Simpson (Democratic) 36.2%
Kentucky	Wendell Ford	Democratic	1974	Incumbent re-elected.	▌ ✓ Wendell Ford (Democratic) 65.1%; ▌Mary L. Foust (Republican) 34.9%
Louisiana	Russell B. Long	Democratic	1948 (special); 1950; 1956; 1962; 1968; 1974	Incumbent re-elected.	▌ ✓ Russell B. Long (Democratic) 57.6%; ▌Woody Jenkins (Democratic) 38.8%; ▌Jerry Bardwell (Republican) 1.6%; Others: ▌Robert M. Ross (Republican) 1.2%; ▌Naomi Bracy (No Party) 0.8%
Maryland	Charles Mathias	Republican	1968; 1974	Incumbent re-elected.	▌ ✓ Charles Mathias (Republican) 66.2%; ▌Edward T. Conroy (Democratic) 33.8%
Missouri	Thomas Eagleton	Democratic	1968; 1974	Incumbent re-elected.	▌ ✓ Thomas Eagleton (Democratic) 52.0%; ▌Gene McNary (Republican) 47.7%; ▌Martha Pettit (Socialist Workers) 0.3%
Nevada	Paul Laxalt	Republican	1974	Incumbent re-elected.	▌ ✓ Paul Laxalt (Republican) 58.5%; ▌Mary Gojack (Democratic) 37.4%
New Hampshire	John A. Durkin	Democratic	1975 (special)	Incumbent lost re-election. Republican gain. Incumbent resigned December 29, 1980 to give successor preferential seniority. Winner appointed December 30, 1980.	▌ ✓ Warren Rudman (Republican) 52.1%; ▌John A. Durkin (Democratic) 47.8%
New York	Jacob Javits	Republican	1956; 1962; 1968; 1974	Incumbent lost renomination, ran as the Liberal nominee, and lost re-election. Republican hold.	▌ ✓ Al D'Amato (Republican) 44.9%; ▌Elizabeth Holtzman (Democratic) 43.5%; ▌Jacob Javits (Liberal) 11.0%; Others: ▌Richard Savadel (Libertarian) 0.4%; ▌William R. Scott (Communist) 0.1%; ▌Thomas Soto (Workers World) 0.1%; ▌Victor A. Nieto (Socialist Workers) 0.1%
North Carolina	Robert Burren Morgan	Democratic	1974	Incumbent lost re-election. Republican gain.	▌ ✓ John Porter East (Republican) 50.0%; ▌Robert Burren Morgan (Democratic) 49.4%
North Dakota	Milton Young	Republican	1945 (appointed); 1946 (special); 1950; 1956; 1962; 1968; 1974	Incumbent retired. Republican hold.	▌ ✓ Mark Andrews (Republican) 70.3%; ▌Kent Johanneson (Democratic-NPL) 29.0%; Others: ▌Harley McLain (Independent) 0.5%; ▌Don J. Klingensmith (Independent) 0.2%
Ohio	John Glenn	Democratic	1974; 1974 (appointed)	Incumbent re-elected.	▌ ✓ John Glenn (Democratic) 68.8%; ▌Jim Betts (Republican) 28.2%; Others: ▌John E. Powers (Independent) 1.9%; ▌Rick Nagin (Independent) 1.1%
Oklahoma	Henry Bellmon	Republican	1968; 1974	Incumbent retired. Republican hold.	▌ ✓ Don Nickles (Republican) 53.5%; ▌Andrew Coats (Democratic) 43.5%; Others: ▌Charles R. Nesbitt (Independent) 1.9%; ▌Robert T. Murphy (Libertarian) 0.9%; ▌Paul E. Trent (Independent) 0.2%
Oregon	Bob Packwood	Republican	1968; 1974	Incumbent re-elected.	▌ ✓ Bob Packwood (Republican) 52.1%; ▌Ted Kulongoski (Democratic) 44.0%; ▌Tonie Nathan (Libertarian) 3.8%
Pennsylvania	Richard Schweiker	Republican	1968; 1974	Incumbent retired. Republican hold.	▌ ✓ Arlen Specter (Republican) 50.5%; ▌Peter F. Flaherty (Democratic) 48.0%
South Carolina	Fritz Hollings	Democratic	1966 (special); 1968; 1974	Incumbent re-elected.	▌ ✓ Fritz Hollings (Democratic) 70.4%; ▌Marshall T. Mays (Republican) 29.6%
South Dakota	George McGovern	Democratic	1962; 1968; 1974	Incumbent lost re-election. Republican gain.	▌ ✓ James Abdnor (Republican) 58.2%; ▌George McGovern (Democratic) 39.4%; ▌Wayne Peterson (Independent) 2.4%
Utah	Jake Garn	Republican	1974	Incumbent re-elected.	▌ ✓ Jake Garn (Republican) 73.6%; ▌Dan Berman (Democratic) 25.5%
Vermont	Patrick Leahy	Democratic	1974	Incumbent re-elected.	▌ ✓ Patrick Leahy (Democratic) 49.8%; ▌Stewart M. Ledbetter (Republican) 48.5%
Washington	Warren Magnuson	Democratic	1944; 1944 (appointed); 1950; 1956; 1962; 1968; 1974	Incumbent lost re-election. Republican gain.	▌ ✓ Slade Gorton (Republican) 54.2%; ▌Warren Magnuson (Democratic) 45.8%
Wisconsin	Gaylord Nelson	Democratic	1962; 1968; 1974	Incumbent lost re-election. Republican gain.	▌ ✓ Bob Kasten (Republican) 50.2%; ▌Gaylord Nelson (Democratic) 48.3%

== Closest races ==
In nineteen races the margin of victory was under 10%.

State	Party of winner	Margin
North Carolina	Republican (flip)	0.58%
Idaho	Republican (flip)	0.97%
Arizona	Republican	1.08%
Vermont	Democratic	1.32%
New York	Republican	1.34% (Note: New York was the "tipping-point state".)
Colorado	Democratic	1.64%
Georgia	Republican (flip)	1.74%
Wisconsin	Republican (flip)	1.85%
Pennsylvania	Republican	2.44%
Alabama	Republican (flip)	3.10%
Florida	Republican (flip)	3.32%
New Hampshire	Republican (flip)	4.29%
Missouri	Democratic	4.33%
Indiana	Republican (flip)	7.58%
Alaska	Republican (flip)	7.75%
Iowa	Republican (flip)	7.95%
Oregon	Republican	8.10%
Washington	Republican (flip)	8.35%
Oklahoma	Republican	9.92%

== Alabama ==
Alabama election
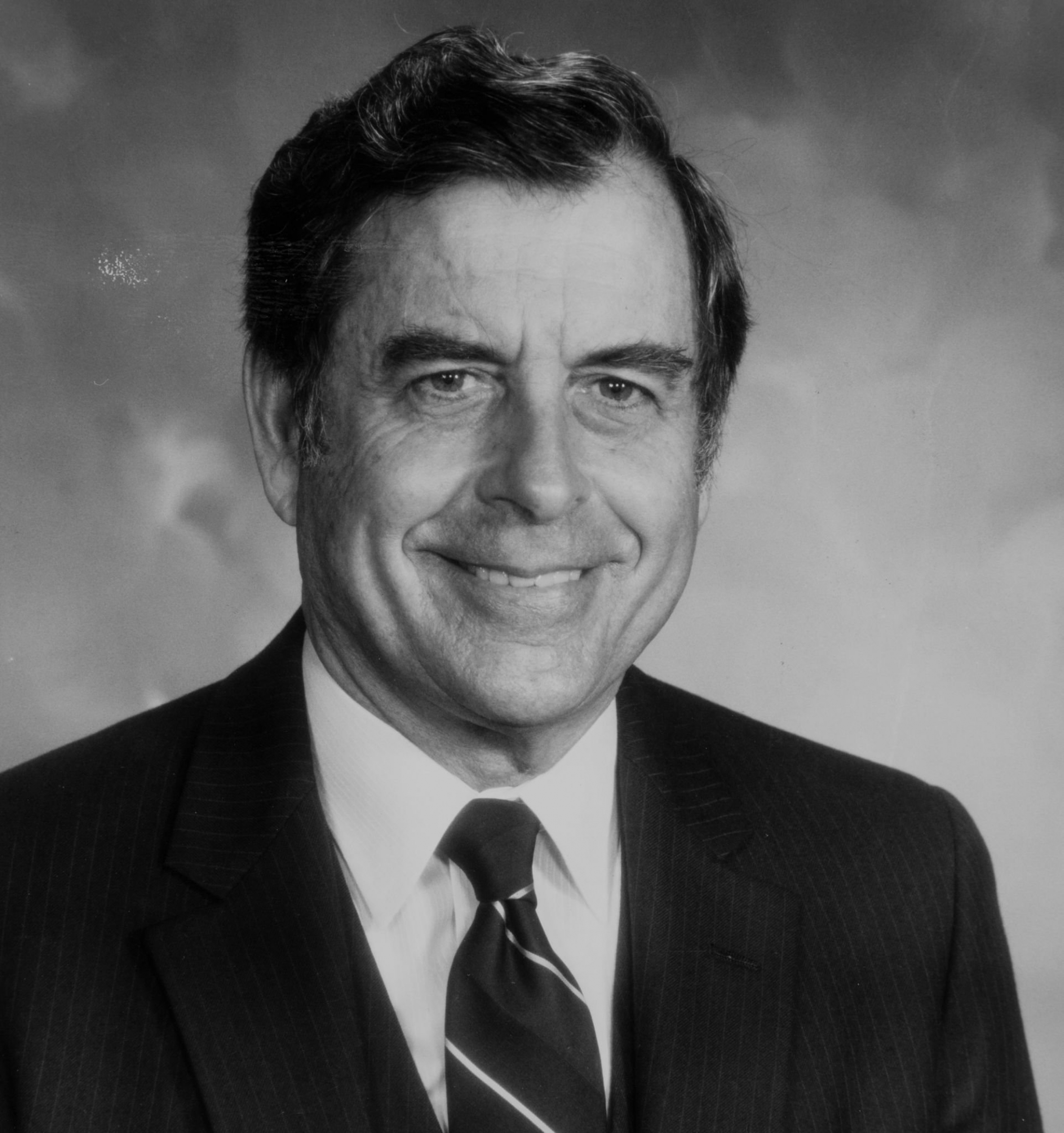

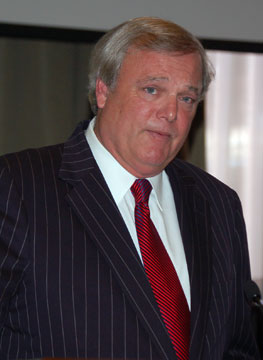
Nominee	Jeremiah Denton	Jim Folsom
Party	Republican	Democratic
Popular vote	650,363	610,175
Percentage	50.2%	47.1%
- County results Denton: 40–50% 50–60% 60–70% Folsom: 40–50% 50–60% 60–70% 70–80% 80–90%
U.S. senator before election
Donald Stewart
Democratic
Elected U.S. senator
Jeremiah Denton
Republican

Incumbent Democrat Donald Stewart decided to run for his first full term, but was defeated in the primary. In November, Republican Jeremiah Denton defeated Democrat Jim Folsom, public service commissioner.

1980 United States Senate election in Alabama
Party	Candidate	Votes	%
Republican	Jeremiah Denton	650,362	50.15%
Democratic	Jim Folsom	610,175	47.05%
Conservative	Michael R. A. Erdey	15,989	1.23%
Libertarian	William A. Crew	13,098	1.01%
NDPA	Sallie M. Hadnott	2,973	0.23%
Statesman Party	Jim Partain	2,649	0.20%
Socialist Workers	Mohammed Oliver	1,511	0.12%
Majority		40,187	3.10%
Turnout		1,296,757	
Republican gain from Democratic			

== Alaska ==
Alaska election
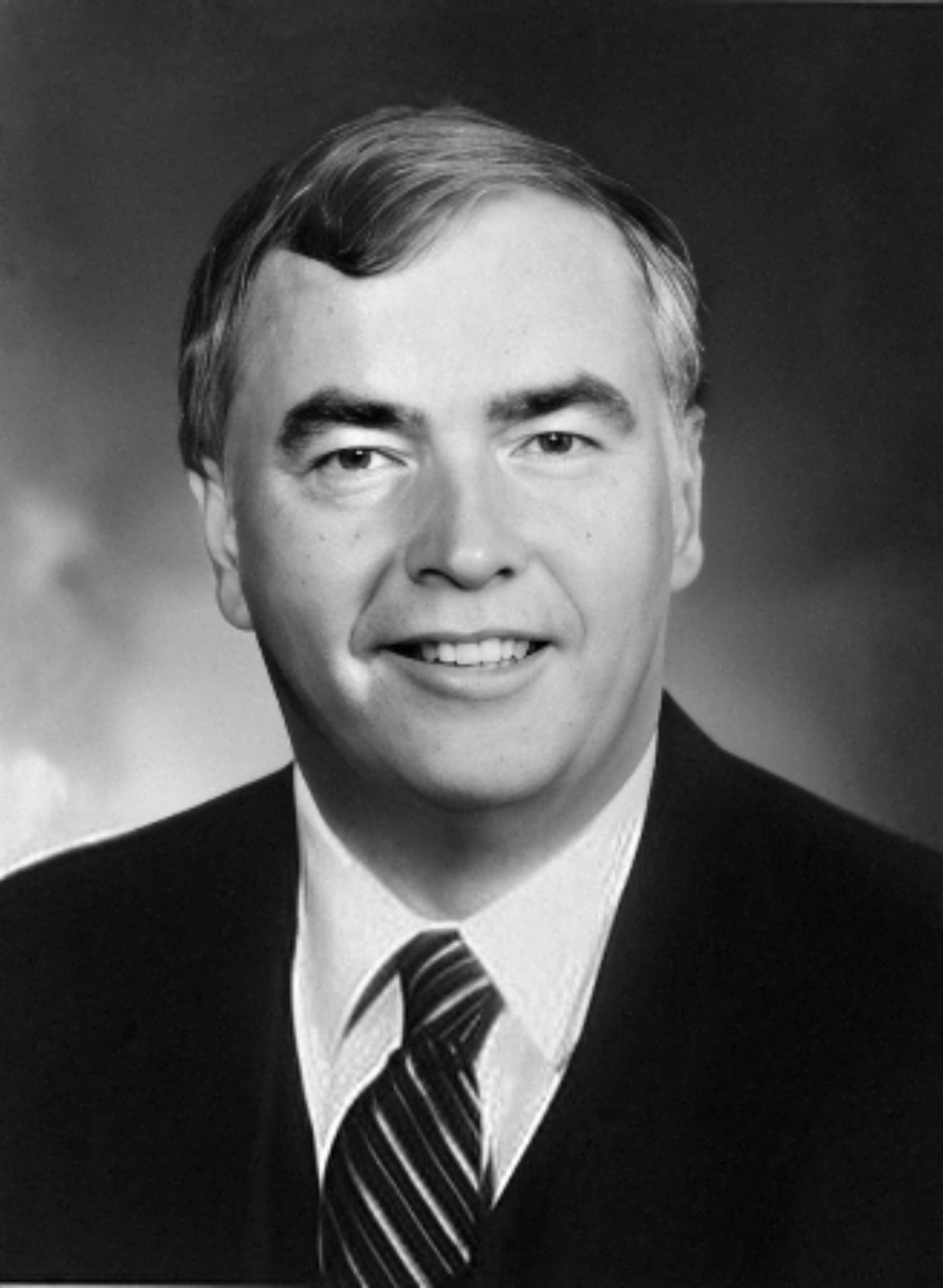

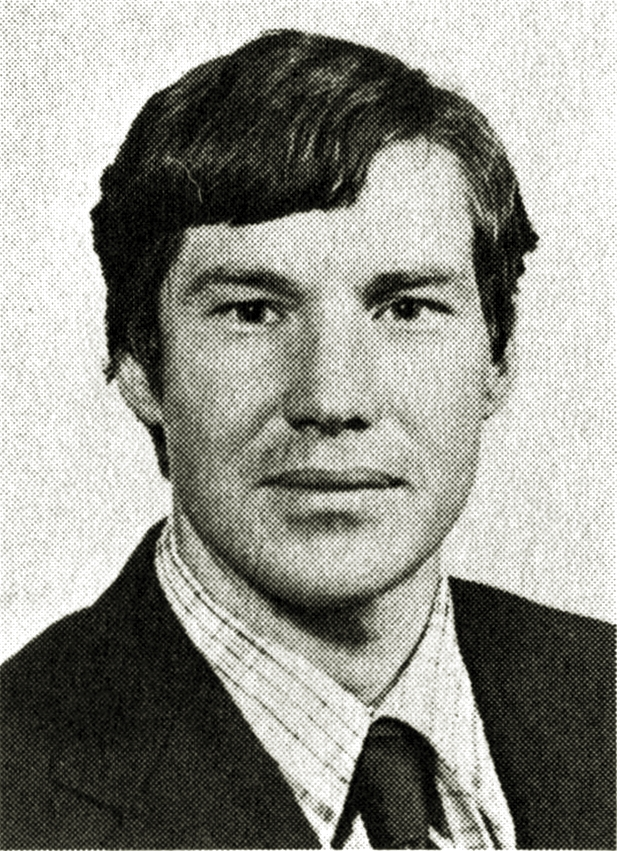
Nominee	Frank Murkowski	Clark Gruening
Party	Republican	Democratic
Popular vote	84,159	72,007
Percentage	53.69%	45.93%
- Results by state house district Murkowski: 50–60% 60–70% Gruening: 50–60% 60–70% 70–80%
U.S. senator before election
Mike Gravel
Democratic
Elected U.S. senator
Frank Murkowski
Republican

Incumbent Democrat Mike Gravel ran for a third term, but lost in the Democratic primary to Clark Gruening, a former state representative who was the grandson of Ernest Gruening, whom Gravel had defeated twelve years prior in an election for the same seat. Gruening later went on to lose the general election to Republican nominee Frank Murkowski, a banker.

After the loss of Gravel's seat, no Alaska Democrat would win a congressional race again until Mark Begich's narrow, protracted triumph in Alaska's 2008 Senate election.

First elected in 1968, by 1980, two-term Democratic incumbent Mike Gravel had become noted for a filibuster that attempted to end the draft during the Vietnam War and for including the full text of the Pentagon Papers in the Congressional Record.

Gravel faced a challenging bid for re-election, complicated by the fact that his triumph over Ernest Gruening years prior had made him a pariah in the Alaska Democratic Party. Though Gravel had campaigned to be selected as George McGovern's running mate in the 1972 U.S. presidential election and had easily won re-election to the Senate in 1974, he had never established a strong political base in Alaska.

The passage of a controversial land bill earlier in the year, as opposed to a compromise bill worked out by fellow senator Ted Stevens that failed thanks to Gravel two years prior, further harmed his re-election bid. A group of Democrats, including future governor Steve Cowper, campaigned against Gravel on the land bill issue.

The sources of Gravel's campaign funds, some of which came from political action committees outside the state, also became an issue in the contest. Another factor may have been Alaska's blanket primary system, which allows unlimited cross-over voting across parties and from its large unaffiliated electorate; Republicans believed Gruening would be an easier candidate to defeat in the general election. The blanket primary had first been used in the 1968 election, and was something Gravel himself was able to capitalize upon in his 1968 campaign.

Gravel would later comment that, by the time of his primary defeat, he had alienated "almost every constituency in Alaska." In the August 26, 1980 primary, Gruening defeated Gravel by 11 percentage points.

Democratic primary results
Party	Candidate	Votes	%
Democratic	Clark Gruening	39,719	54.88%
Democratic	Mike Gravel (incumbent)	31,504	43.53%
Democratic	Michael J. Beasley	1,145	1.58%
Total votes		72,368	100.00%

Republican primary results
Party	Candidate	Votes	%
Republican	Frank Murkowski	16,262	58.92%
Republican	Art Kennedy	5,527	20.02%
Republican	Morris Thompson	3,635	13.17%
Republican	Don Smith	896	3.25%
Republican	Donald R. Wright	824	2.99%
Republican	Dave Moe	458	1.66%
Total votes		27,602	100.00%

1980 United States Senate election in Alaska
Party	Candidate	Votes	%	±%
Republican	Frank Murkowski	84,159	53.69%	+11.97%
Democratic	Clark Gruening	72,007	45.93%	−12.35%
Write-ins		596	0.38%	
Majority		12,152	7.75%	−8.81%
Turnout		156,762		
Republican gain from Democratic		Swing		

== Arizona ==
Arizona election
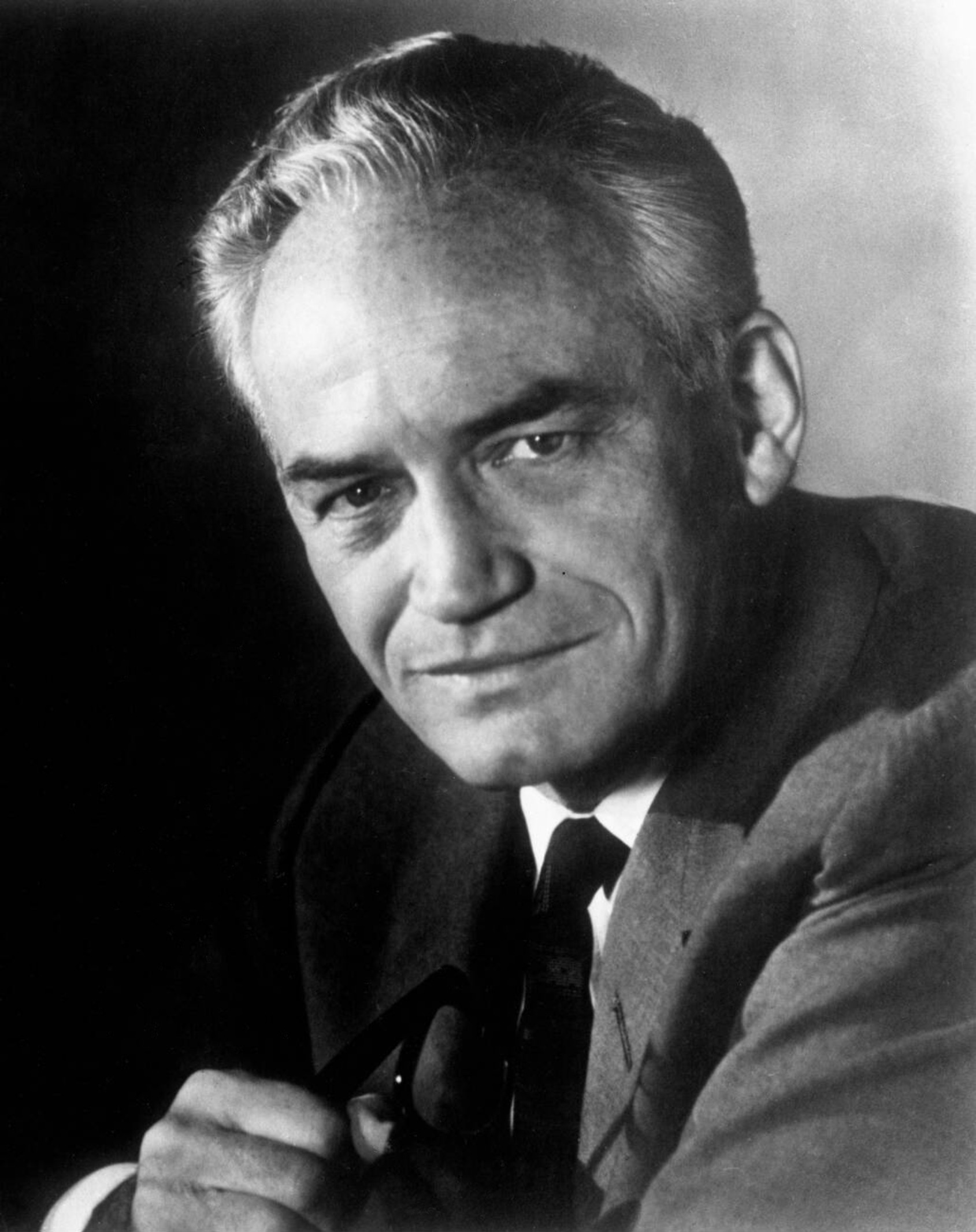

Nominee	Barry Goldwater	Bill Schulz
Party	Republican	Democratic
Popular vote	432,371	422,972
Percentage	49.46%	48.38%
- County results Goldwater: 40–50% 50–60% Schulz: 40–50% 50–60% 60–70%
U.S. senator before election
Barry Goldwater
Republican
Elected U.S. senator
Barry Goldwater
Republican

Incumbent Republican Barry Goldwater decided to run for reelection to a third consecutive term, after returning to the U.S. Senate in 1968 following his failed presidential run in 1964 against Lyndon B. Johnson. Goldwater defeated Democratic Party nominee Bill Schulz in the general election, but only by a narrow margin, which later caused Goldwater to decide against running for reelection to a fourth consecutive term.

Democratic primary results
Party	Candidate	Votes	%
Democratic	Bill Schulz	97,520	55.36%
Democratic	James F. McNulty Jr.	58,894	33.43%
Democratic	Frank DePaoli	19,259	10.93%
Democratic	Frances Morgan (withdrawn)	485	0.28%
Total votes		176,158	100.00

1980 United States Senate election in Arizona
Party	Candidate	Votes	%	±%
Republican	Barry Goldwater (incumbent)	432,371	49.46%	
Democratic	Bill Schulz	422,972	48.38%	
Libertarian	Fred R. Esser	12,008	1.37%	
People Over Politics	Lorenzo Torrez	3,608	0.41%	
Socialist Workers	Josefina Otero	3,266	0.37%	
Majority		9,399	1.08%	
Turnout		874,225		
Republican hold		Swing		

== Arkansas ==
Arkansas election
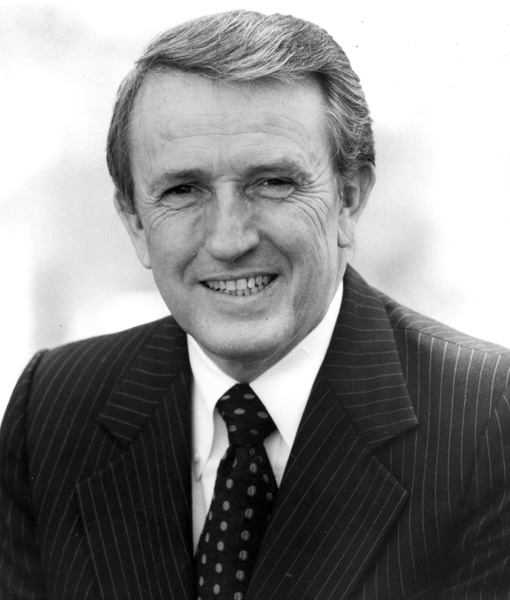

Nominee	Dale Bumpers	William Clark
Party	Democratic	Republican
Popular vote	477,905	330,576
Percentage	59.1%	40.9%
- County results Bumpers: 50–60% 60–70% 70–80% Clark: 50–60% 60–70% 70–80%
U.S. senator before election
Dale Bumpers
Democratic
Elected U.S. senator
Dale Bumpers
Democratic

Incumbent Democrat Dale Bumpers won re-election to a second term over real estate broker William Clark.

Arkansas Senate election 1980
Party	Candidate	Votes	%
Democratic	Dale Bumpers (incumbent)	477,905	59.1%
Republican	Bill Clark	330,576	40.9%
Independent	Walter McCarty	331	0.0%
Majority		117,329	14.0%
Turnout		808,812	
Democratic hold			

== California ==
California election
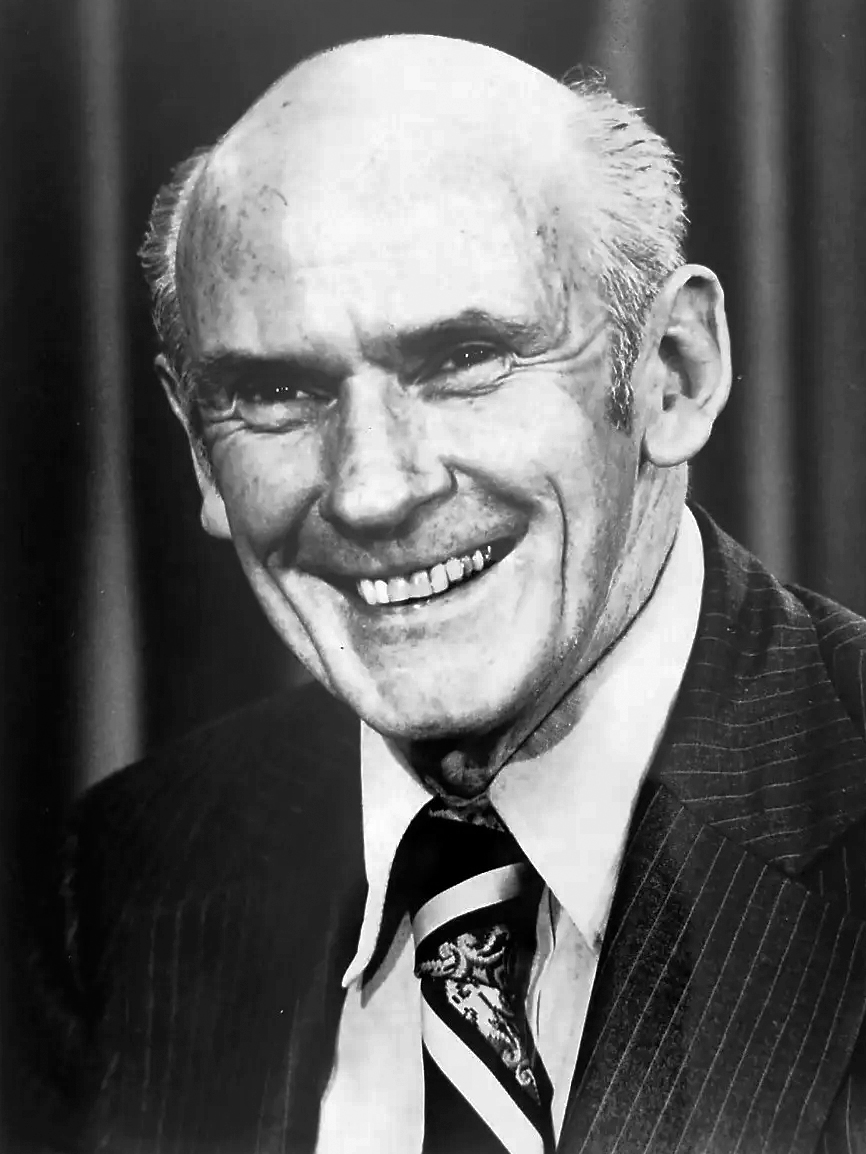

Nominee	Alan Cranston	Paul Gann
Party	Democratic	Republican
Popular vote	4,705,399	3,093,426
Percentage	56.5%	37.2%
- County results Cranston: 40-50% 50–60% 60–70% 70–80% Gann: 40–50% 50–60%
U.S. senator before election
Alan Cranston
Democratic
Elected U.S. senator
Alan Cranston
Democratic

Incumbent Democrat Alan Cranston easily won re-election to a third term over Paul Gann, political activist, even as the state's former Republican governor, Ronald Reagan, claimed a landslide victory in the presidential election.

1980 United States Senate election, California
Party	Candidate	Votes	%
Democratic	Alan Cranston (incumbent)	4,705,399	56.5%
Republican	Paul Gann	3,093,426	37.2%
Libertarian	David Bergland	202,481	2.4%
Peace and Freedom	David Wald	196,354	2.4%
American Independent	James C. Griffin	129,648	1.6%
Majority		1,612,427	19.3%
Turnout		8,324,012	
Democratic hold			

== Colorado ==
Colorado election
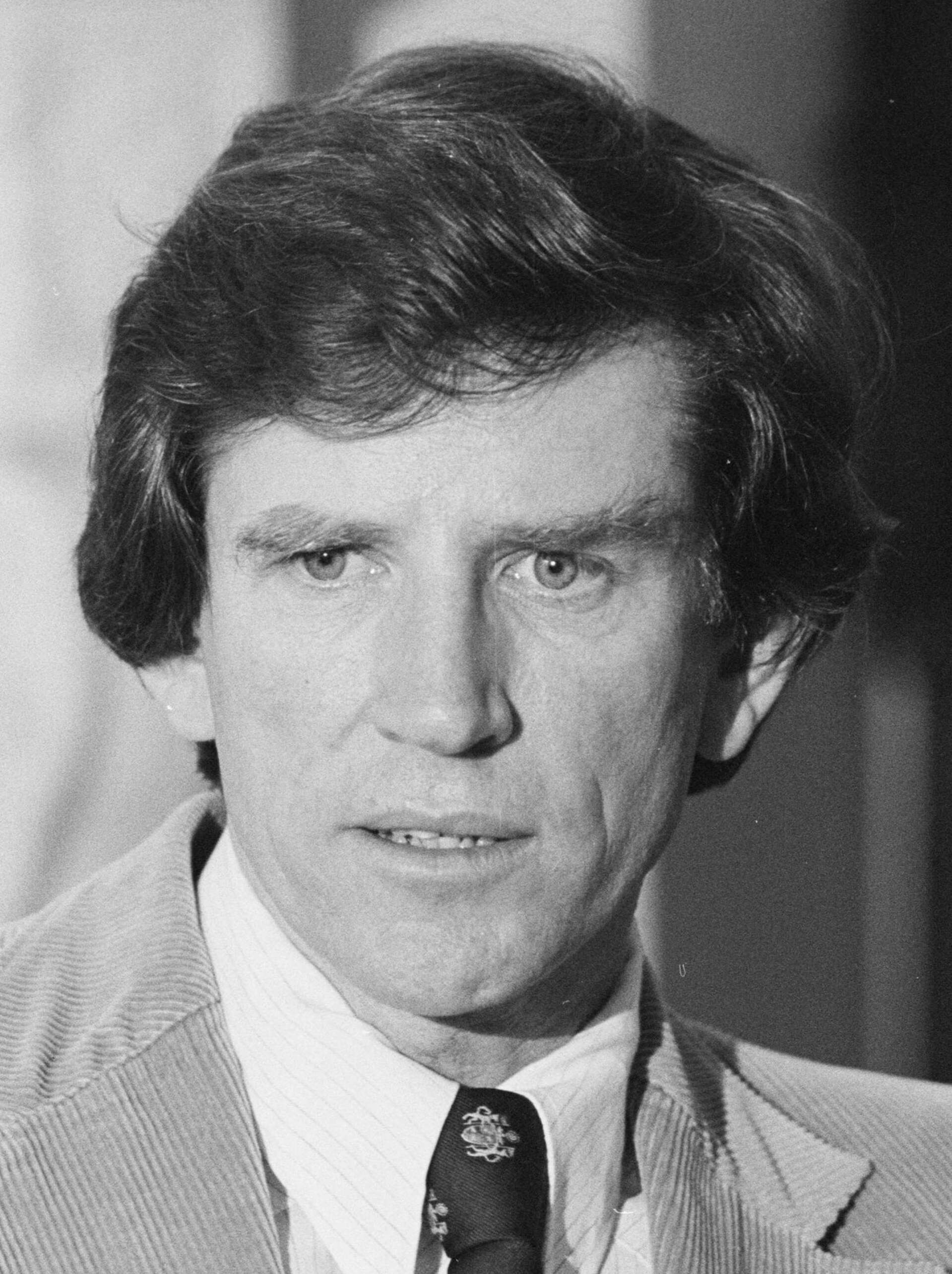

Nominee	Gary Hart	Mary Estill Buchanan
Party	Democratic	Republican
Popular vote	590,501	571,295
Percentage	50.3%	48.7%
- County results Hart: 50–60% 60–70% Bunchanan: 50–60% 60–70% 70–80%
U.S. senator before election
Gary Hart
Democratic
Elected U.S. senator
Gary Hart
Democratic

Incumbent Democrat Gary Hart won re-election to a second term over Mary Estill Buchanan, Colorado secretary of state.

General election results
Party	Candidate	Votes	%	±%
Democratic	Gary Hart (incumbent)	590,501	50.33%	−6.90%
Republican	Mary Estill Buchanan	571,295	48.70%	+9.20%
Statesman	Earl Higgerson	7,265	0.62%	
Independent American	Henry John Olshaw	4,081	0.35%	
Majority		19,206	1.64%	−16.10%
Turnout		1,173,142		
Democratic hold		Swing		

== Connecticut ==
Connecticut election
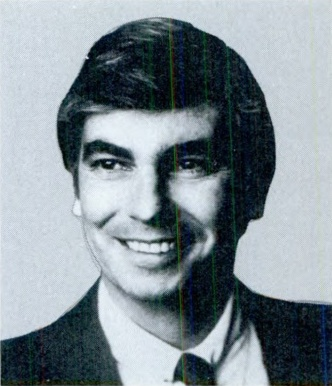

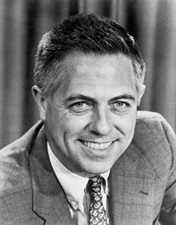
Nominee	Chris Dodd	James Buckley
Party	Democratic	Republican
Popular vote	763,969	581,884
Percentage	56.3%	42.9%
- Dodd: 40–50% 50–60% 60–70% 70–80% 80–90% Buckley: 40–50% 50–60% 60–70% 70–80%
U.S. senator before election
Abraham Ribicoff
Democratic
Elected U.S. senator
Chris Dodd
Democratic

Incumbent Democrat Abraham Ribicoff decided to retire. Democrat Chris Dodd won the open seat over James Buckley, former U.S. senator from New York.

1980 Connecticut United States Senate election
Party	Candidate	Votes	%
Democratic	Chris Dodd	763,969	56.3%
Republican	James Buckley	581,884	42.9%
Libertarian	Jerry Brennan	5,336	0.4%
Concerned Citizens	Andrew J. Zemel	4,772	0.4%
Write-Ins		114	0.0%
Majority		182,085	13.4%
Turnout		1,356,075	
Democratic hold			

== Florida ==
Florida election
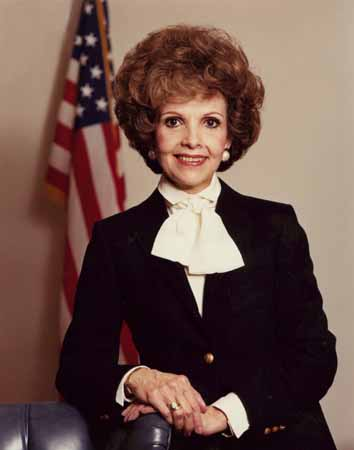

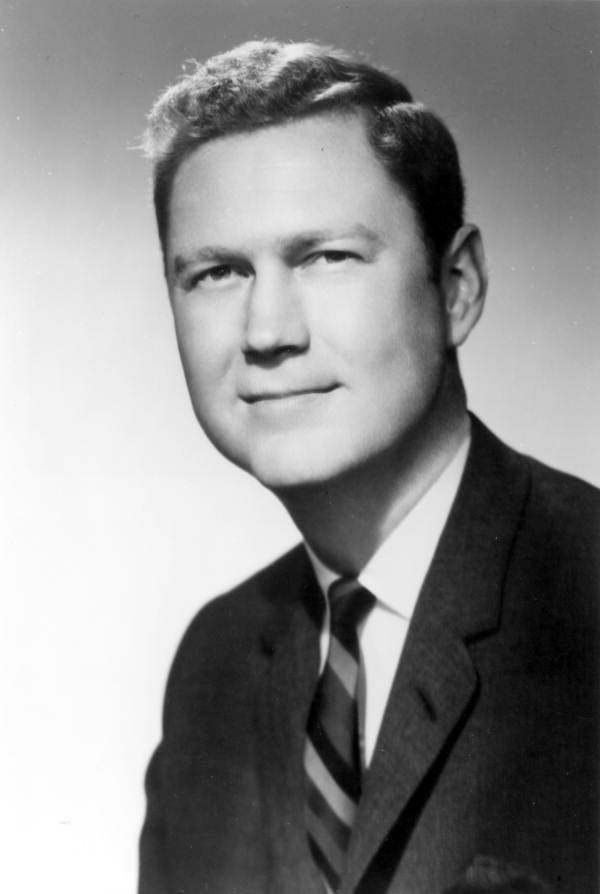
Nominee	Paula Hawkins	Bill Gunter
Party	Republican	Democratic
Popular vote	1,822,460	1,705,409
Percentage	51.7%	48.3%
- County results Hawkins: 50–60% 60–70% Gunter: 50–60% 60–70% 70–80%
U.S. senator before election
Richard Stone
Democratic
Elected U.S. senator
Paula Hawkins
Republican

Incumbent Democrat Richard Stone decided to run for re-election to a second term, but was defeated in the Democratic primary election by Bill Gunter. Republican Paula Hawkins won the open seat.

Stone, a freshman senator, had a reputation for changing his mind. In 1980, the AFL–CIO actively campaigned against him, and Stone was deemed vulnerable in his re-election bid. Six Democrats entered the race for Stone's seat, including his 1974 runoff opponent Bill Gunter, who was Florida state treasurer/insurance commissioner in 1980. As was the case in 1974, Stone and Gunter were forced into a runoff, but, unlike in 1974, Gunter won the nomination.

Democratic primary results
Party	Candidate	Votes	%
Democratic	Richard Stone	355,287	32.08%
Democratic	Bill Gunter	335,859	30.33%
Democratic	Buddy MacKay	272,538	24.61%
Democratic	Richard A. Pettigrew	108,154	9.77%
Democratic	James L. Miller	18,118	1.64%
Democratic	John B. Coffey	17,410	1.57%
Total votes		1,107,366	100.00%

Democratic primary runoff results
Party	Candidate	Votes	%
Democratic	Bill Gunter	594,676	51.76%
Democratic	Richard Stone	554,268	48.24%
Total votes		1,148,944	100.00%

Republican primary results
Party	Candidate	Votes	%
Republican	Paula Hawkins	209,856	48.14%
Republican	Louis Frey Jr.	119,834	27.49%
Republican	Ander Crenshaw	54,767	12.56%
Republican	Ellis Rubin	19,990	4.59%
Republican	John T. Ware	18,118	1.64%
Republican	Lewis Dinkins	15,174	3.48%
Total votes		435,962	100.00%

Republican primary runoff results
Party	Candidate	Votes	%
Republican	Paula Hawkins	293,600	61.61%
Republican	Louis Frey Jr.	182,911	38.39%
Total votes		476,511	100.00%

General election results
Party	Candidate	Votes	%	±%
Republican	Paula Hawkins	1,822,460	51.66%	+10.74%
Democratic	Bill Gunter	1,705,409	48.34%	+4.96%
Write-ins		159	0.00%	
Majority		117,051	3.32%	+0.85%
Turnout		3,528,028		
Republican gain from Democratic		Swing		

== Georgia ==
Georgia election
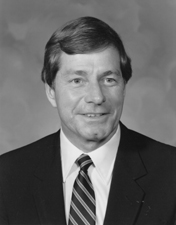

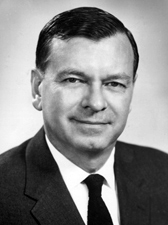
Nominee	Mack Mattingly	Herman Talmadge
Party	Republican	Democratic
Popular vote	803,686	776,143
Percentage	50.87%	49.13%
- County results Mattingly: 50-60% 60-70% 70-80% Talmadge: 50–60% 60–70% 70–80% 80–90%
U.S. senator before election
Herman Talmadge
Democratic
Elected U.S. senator
Mack Mattingly
Republican

Incumbent Democrat and former Governor of Georgia Herman Talmadge decided to run for re-election to a fifth term, but lost a close race to Mack Mattingly, chairman of the Georgia Republican Party. 1980 resulted in a landslide election for Republicans that would come to be known as the Reagan Revolution.

1980 United States Senate election, Georgia
Party	Candidate	Votes	%	±%
Republican	Mack Mattingly	803,686	50.87%	+22.63%
Democratic	Herman Talmadge (incumbent)	776,143	49.13%	−22.63%
Majority		27,543	1.74%	−41.78%
Turnout		1,579,829		
Republican gain from Democratic		Swing	22.63%	

== Hawaii ==
Hawaii election
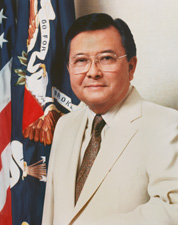

Nominee	Daniel Inouye	Cooper Brown
Party	Democratic	Republican
Popular vote	224,485	53,068
Percentage	77.95%	18.43%
- County results Inouye: 70–80% 80–90%
U.S. senator before election
Daniel Inouye
Democratic
Elected U.S. Senator
Daniel Inouye
Democratic

Incumbent Democrat Daniel Inouye was re-elected to a fourth term, defeating Republican Cooper Brown.

1980 United States Senate election in Hawaii
Party	Candidate	Votes	%
Democratic	Daniel Inouye (incumbent)	224,485	77.94%
Republican	Cooper Brown	53,068	18.43%
Libertarian	Bud Shasteen	10,453	3.63%
Majority		171,417	59.51%
Turnout		288,006	
Democratic hold			

== Idaho ==
Idaho election
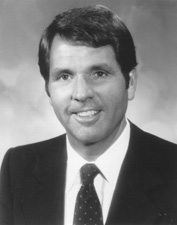

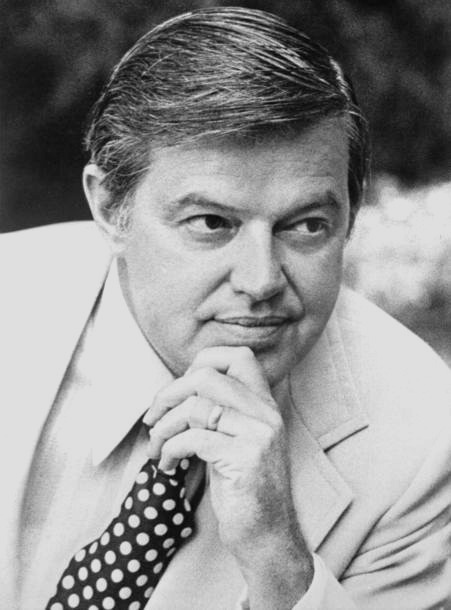
Nominee	Steve Symms	Frank Church
Party	Republican	Democratic
Popular vote	218,701	214,439
Percentage	49.7%	48.8%
- County results Symms: 40–50% 50–60% 60–70% 70–80% Church: 40–50% 50–60% 60–70%
U.S. senator before election
Frank Church
Democratic
Elected U.S. senator
Steve Symms
Republican

Incumbent Democrat Frank Church ran for re-election to a fifth term, but was defeated by Republican Steve Symms, U.S. congressman.

General election results
Party	Candidate	Votes	%	±%
Republican	Steve Symms	218,701	49.74%	+7.61%
Democratic	Frank Church (incumbent)	214,439	48.78%	−7.30%
Libertarian	Larry Fullmer	6,507	1.48%	
Majority		4,262	0.97%	−12.96%
Turnout		439,647		
Republican gain from Democratic		Swing		

== Illinois ==
Illinois election
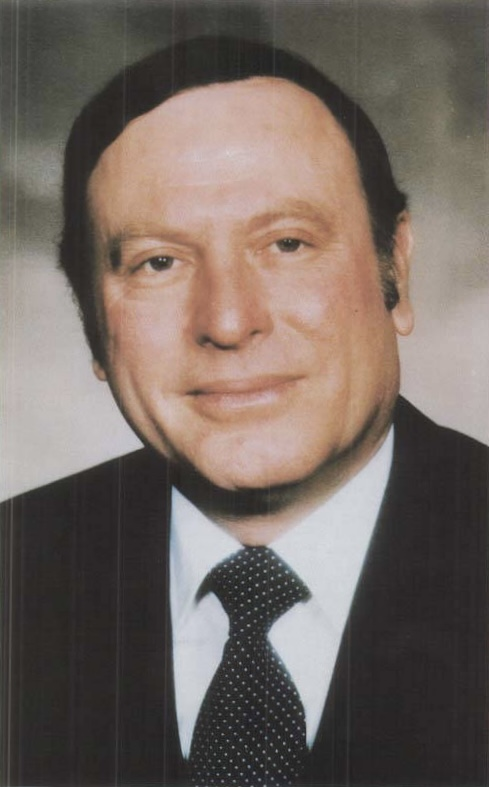

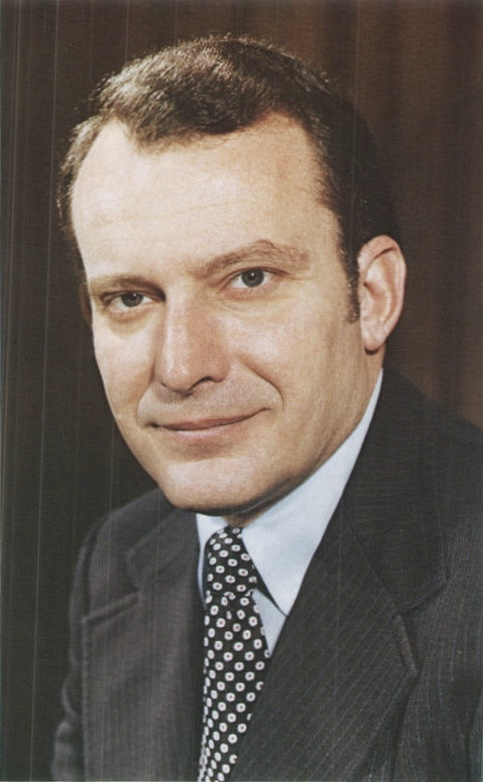
Nominee	Alan Dixon	Dave O'Neal
Party	Democratic	Republican
Popular vote	2,565,302	1,946,296
Percentage	56.0%	42.5%
- County results Dixon: 40–50% 50–60% 60–70% O'Neal: 40–50% 50–60% 60–70%
U.S. senator before election
Adlai Stevenson III
Democratic
Elected U.S. senator
Alan J. Dixon
Democratic

Incumbent Democrat Adlai Stevenson III decided to retire. Democrat Alan J. Dixon won the open seat, beating Dave O'Neal, lieutenant governor of Illinois.

1980 Illinois United States Senate election
Party	Candidate	Votes	%
Democratic	Alan Dixon	2,565,302	56.0%
Republican	Dave O'Neal	1,946,296	42.5%
Libertarian	Bruce Green	29,328	0.6%
Independent	Sidney Lens	19,213	0.4%
Communist	Charles F. Wilson	5,671	0.2%
Workers World	Michael Soriano	5,626	0.1%
Socialist Workers	Burton L. Artz	2,715	0.1%
Write-Ins		96	0.00%
Majority		619,006	13.5%
Turnout		4,580,030	
Democratic hold			

== Indiana ==
Indiana election
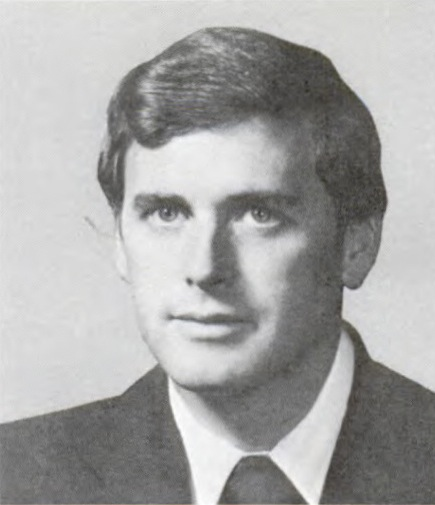

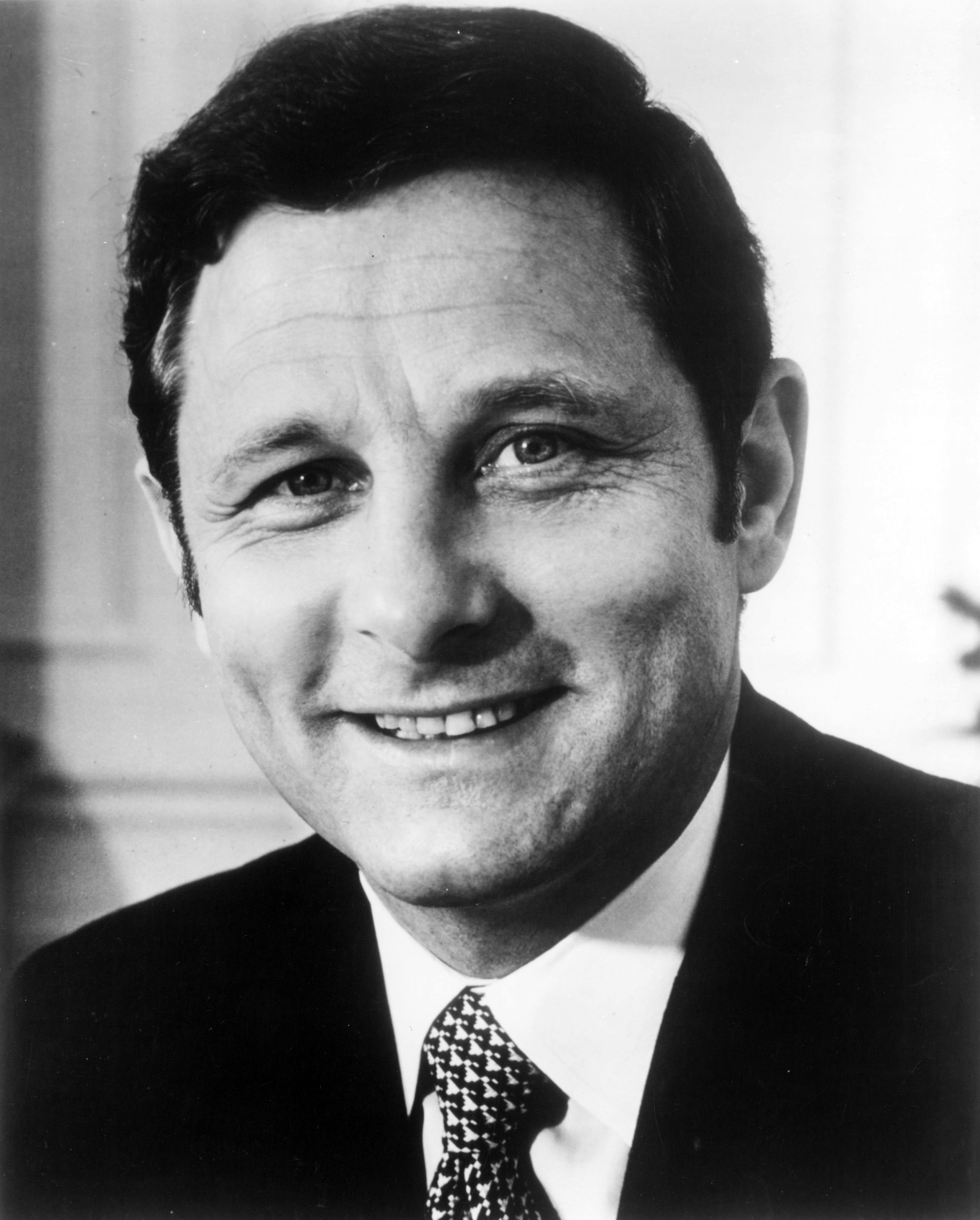
Nominee	Dan Quayle	Birch Bayh
Party	Republican	Democratic
Popular vote	1,182,414	1,015,922
Percentage	53.8%	46.2%
- County results Quayle: 50–60% 60–70% 70–80% Bayh: 50–60%
U.S. senator before election
Birch Bayh
Democratic
Elected U.S. senator
Dan Quayle
Republican

Incumbent Democrat Birch Bayh ran for a fourth term, but was defeated by Republican Dan Quayle.

Republican primary results
Party	Candidate	Votes	%
Republican	Dan Quayle	397,273	77.06%
Republican	Roger Marsh	118,273	22.94%

Birch Bayh, the incumbent senator, faced no opposition within the Indiana Democratic Party and avoided a primary election. Bayh was originally elected in 1962, and was re-elected in 1968 and 1974. He was chairman of the Senate Intelligence Committee and architect of the 25th and 26th Amendments. This election was one of the key races in the country, and signaled a trend that would come to be known as Reagan's coattails, describing the influence Ronald Reagan had in congressional elections. Incumbent three-term Senator Bayh was defeated by over 160,000 votes by Representative Dan Quayle, who would go on to be vice president of the United States.

General election results
Party	Candidate	Votes	%
Republican	Dan Quayle	1,182,414	53.79%
Democratic	Birch Bayh (incumbent)	1,015,922	46.21%
Majority		166,492	7.58%
Turnout		2,198,366	
Republican gain from Democratic			

== Iowa ==
Iowa election
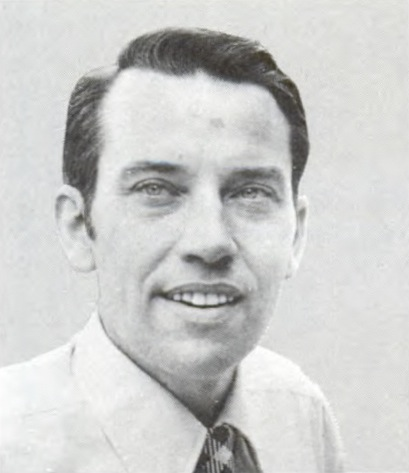

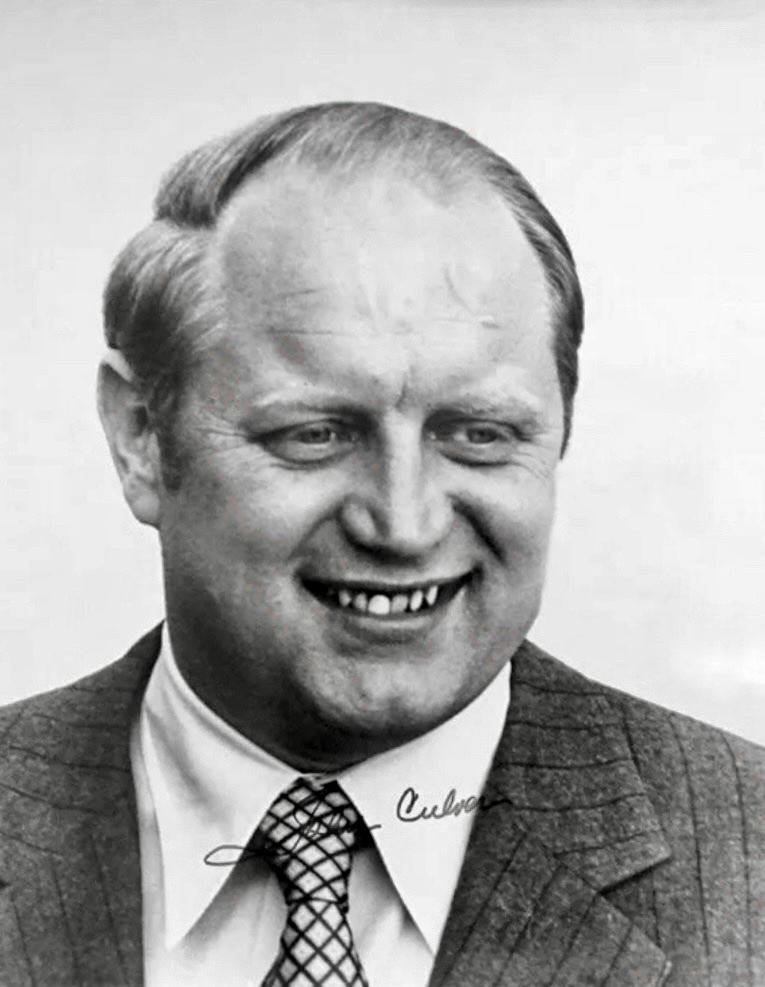
Nominee	Chuck Grassley	John Culver
Party	Republican	Democratic
Popular vote	683,014	581,545
Percentage	53.49%	45.54%
- County results Grassley: 50-60% 60-70% 70-80% Culver: 50–60% 60–70%
U.S. senator before election
John Culver
Democratic
Elected U.S. senator
Chuck Grassley
Republican

Incumbent Democrat John Culver sought re-election to a second term in the Senate, but was unsuccessful, falling to Chuck Grassley, the United States congressman from Iowa's 3rd congressional district, the Republican nominee.

Democratic primary results
Party	Candidate	Votes	%
Democratic	John Culver (incumbent)	95,656	99.95%
Democratic	Write-ins	52	0.05%
Total votes		95,708	100.00%

Republican primary results
Party	Candidate	Votes	%
Republican	Chuck Grassley	170,120	65.54%
Republican	Tom Stoner	89,409	34.45%
Republican	Write-ins	34	0.01%
Total votes		259,563	100.00%

1980 United States Senate election in Iowa
Party	Candidate	Votes	%	±%
Republican	Chuck Grassley	683,014	53.49%	+4.21%
Democratic	John Culver (incumbent)	581,545	45.54%	–4.48%
Independent	Garry De Young	5,858	0.46%	
Libertarian	Robert V. Hengerer	4,233	0.33%	
Independent	John Ingram Henderson	2,336	0.18%	
Majority		101,469	7.95%	+7.20%
Turnout		1,772,983		
Republican gain from Democratic		Swing		

== Kansas ==
Kansas election
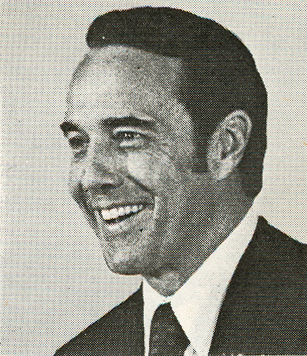

Nominee	Bob Dole	John Simpson
Party	Republican	Democratic
Popular vote	598,686	340,271
Percentage	63.76%	36.24%
- County results Dole: 50–60% 60–70% 70–80%
U.S. senator before election
Bob Dole
Republican
Elected U.S. Senator
Bob Dole
Republican

Incumbent Republican Bob Dole won re-election to a third term, defeating Democratic (formerly Republican) state Senator John Simpson.

1980 United States Senate election in Kansas
Party	Candidate	Votes	%
Republican	Bob Dole (incumbent)	598,686	63.76%
Democratic	John Simpson	340,271	36.24%
Majority		258,415	27.52%
Turnout		938,957	
Republican hold			

== Kentucky ==
Kentucky election
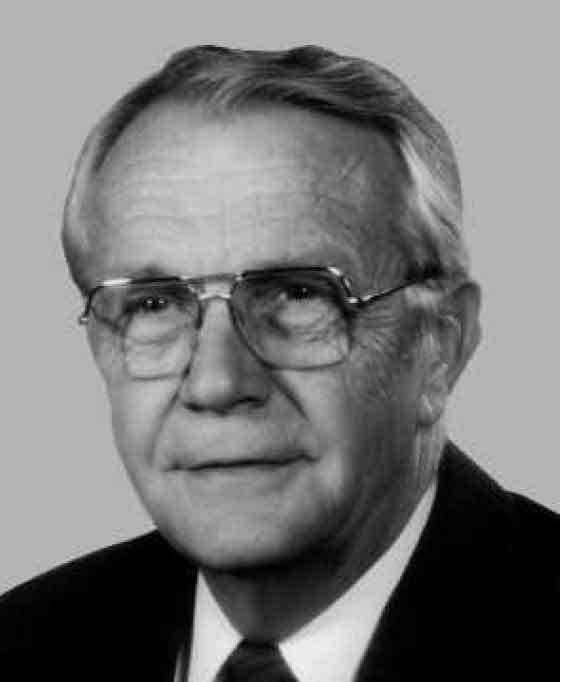
Nominee	Wendell Ford	Mary Louise Foust
Party	Democratic	Republican
Popular vote	720,891	386,029
Percentage	65.13%	34.87%
- County results Ford: 50–60% 60–70% 70–80% 80–90% Foust: 50–60% 60–70% 70–80%
U.S. senator before election
Wendell Ford
Democratic
Elected U.S. senator
Wendell Ford
Democratic

Democrat Wendell Ford won re-election, defeating Republican Mary Louise Foust.

General election results
Party	Candidate	Votes	%
Democratic	Wendell Ford (incumbent)	720,891	65.13%
Republican	Mary Louise Foust	386,029	34.87%
Majority		334,862	30.26%
Turnout		1,106,920	
Democratic hold			

== Louisiana ==
Louisiana election
- September 13, 1980
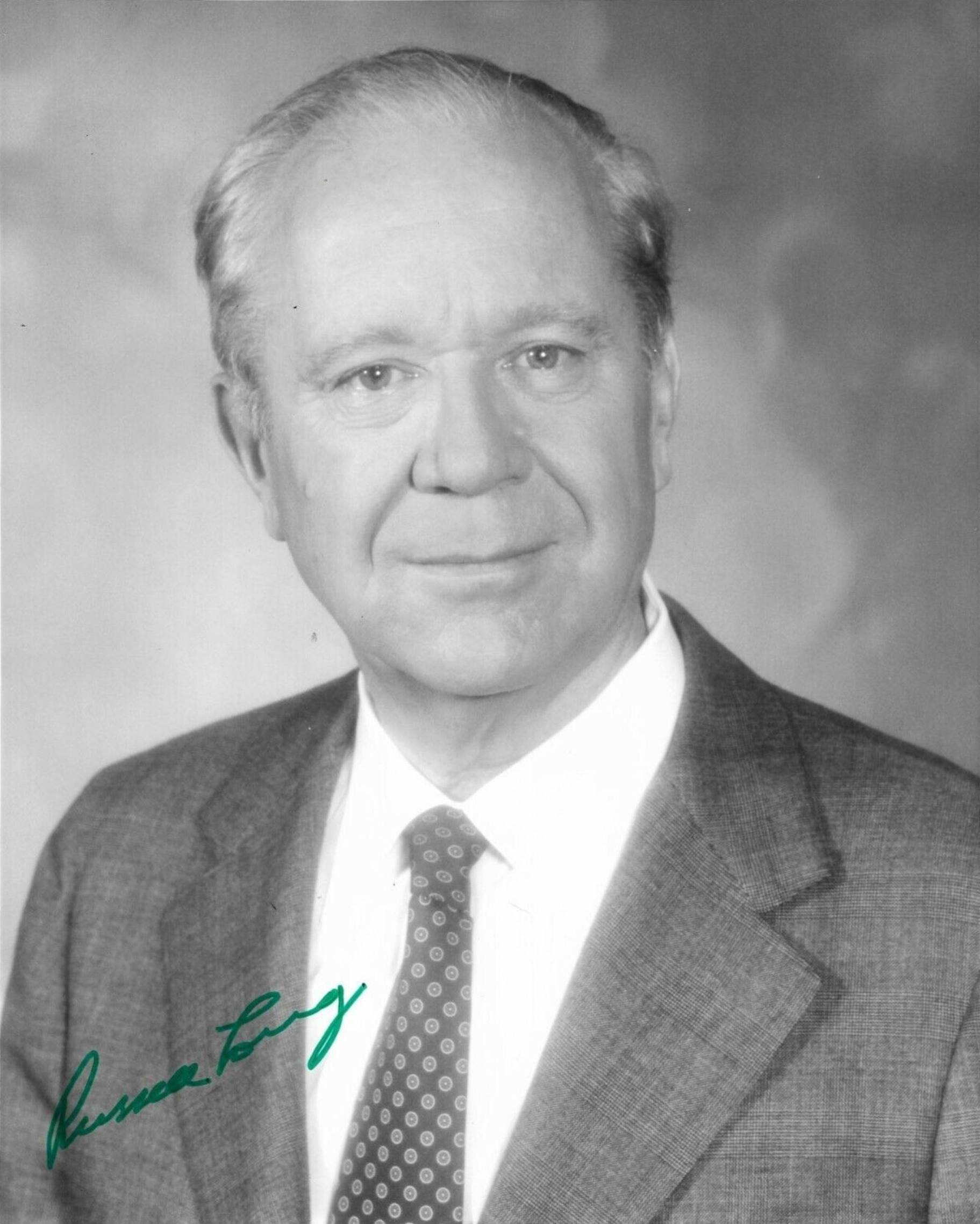

Nominee	Russell B. Long	Woody Jenkins
Party	Democratic	Democratic
Popular vote	484,770	325,992
Percentage	57.64%	38.76%
- Parish results Long: 50–60% 60–70% 70–80% Jenkins: 50–60%
U.S. senator before election
Russell B. Long
Democratic
Elected U.S. Senator
Russell B. Long
Democratic

Incumbent Russell B. Long ran for re-election to a seventh and final term, defeating state Representative Woody Jenkins.

1980 United States Senate election in Louisiana
Party	Candidate	Votes	%
Democratic	Russell Long (incumbent)	484,770	57.64%
Democratic	Woody Jenkins	325,922	38.76%
Republican	Jerry C. Bardwell	13,739	1.63%
Republican	Robert Max Ross	10,208	1.21%
No Party	Maomi Bracey	6,374	0.76%
Majority		158,848	18.89
Turnout		841,013	
Democratic hold			

== Maryland ==
Maryland election
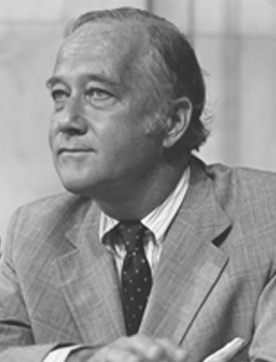

Nominee	Charles Mathias	Edward T. Conroy
Party	Republican	Democratic
Popular vote	850,970	435,118
Percentage	66.17%	33.83%
- County results Mathias: 50–60% 60–70% 70–80%
U.S. senator before election
Charles Mathias
Republican
Elected U.S. Senator
Charles Mathias
Republican

Incumbent Republican Charles Mathias ran for re-election to a third term, and defeated Democratic state Senator Edward T. Conroy.

1980 United States Senate election in Maryland
Party	Candidate	Votes	%
Republican	Charles Mathias (incumbent)	850,970	66.17%
Democratic	Edward T. Conroy	435,118	33.83%
Majority		415,852	32.34%
Turnout		1,286,088	
Republican hold			

== Missouri ==
Missouri election
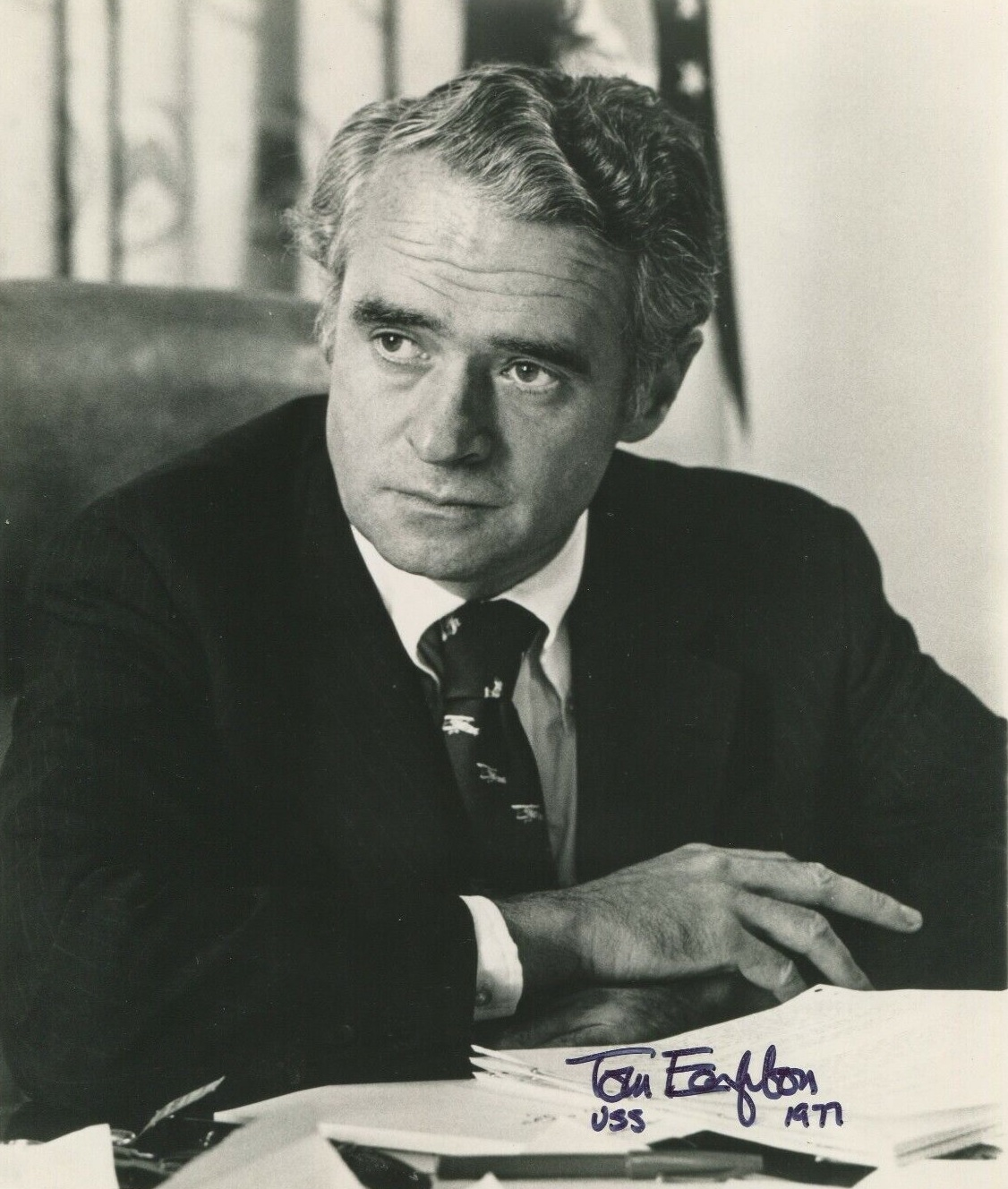

Nominee	Thomas Eagleton	Gene McNary
Party	Democratic	Republican
Popular vote	1,074,859	985,399
Percentage	52.00%	47.67%
- County results Eagleton: 50–60% 60–70% 70–80% McNary: 50-60% 60-70% 70-80%
U.S. senator before election
Thomas Eagleton
Democratic
Elected U.S. Senator
Thomas Eagleton
Democratic

Incumbent Democrat Thomas Eagleton won reelection, defeating Republican St. Louis County Executive Gene McNary.

1980 United States Senate election in Missouri
Party	Candidate	Votes	%
Democratic	Thomas Eagleton (incumbent)	1,074,859	52.00%
Republican	Gene McNary	985,399	47.67%
Socialist Workers	Martha Pettis	6,707	0.32%
Majority		89,460	4.33%
Turnout		2,066,965	
Democratic hold			

== Nevada ==
Nevada election
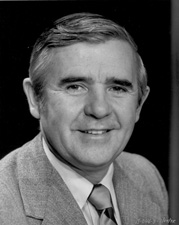

Nominee	Paul Laxalt	Mary Gojack
Party	Republican	Democratic
Popular vote	144,224	92,129
Percentage	58.5%	37.4%
- County results Laxalt: 50–60% 60–70% 70–80% 80–90%
U.S. senator before election
Paul Laxalt
Republican
Elected U.S. senator
Paul Laxalt
Republican

Incumbent Republican Paul Laxalt won re-election to a second term over Mary Gojack, former state senator (1974–1978) and former state assemblywoman (1972–1974).

General election results
Party	Candidate	Votes	%	±%
Republican	Paul Laxalt (incumbent)	144,224	58.52%	+11.55%
Democratic	Mary Gojack	92,129	37.38%	−9.22%
Libertarian	Allen Hacker	6,920	2.81%	
None of These Candidates		3,163	1.28%	
Majority		52,095	21.14%	+20.77%
Turnout		246,436		
Republican hold		Swing		

== New Hampshire ==
New Hampshire election
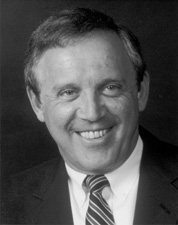

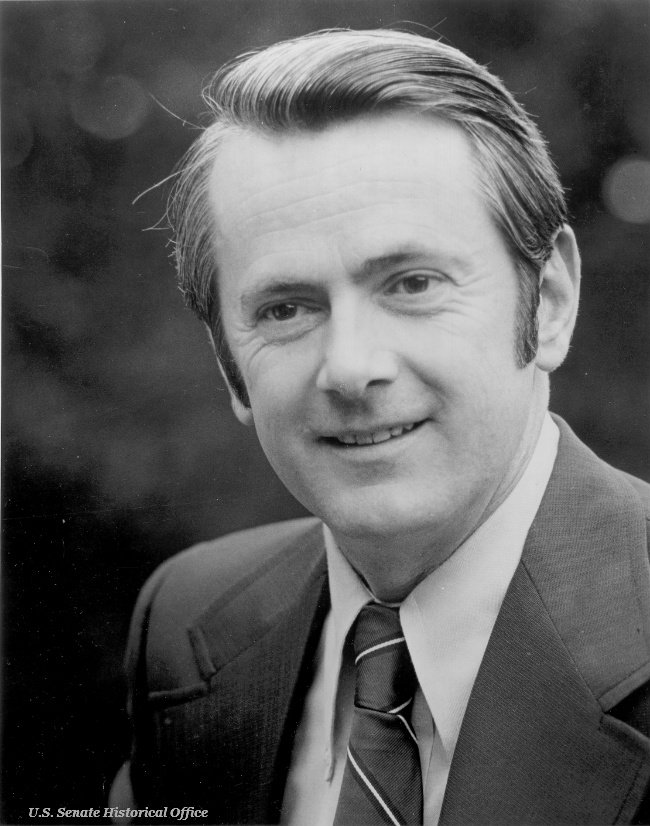
Nominee	Warren Rudman	John Durkin
Party	Republican	Democratic
Popular vote	195,559	179,455
Percentage	52.2%	47.8%
- Rudman: 50–60% 60–70% 70–80% 80–90% Durkin: 50–60% 60–70% 80–90% Tie: 50%
U.S. senator before election
John A. Durkin
Democratic
Elected U.S. senator
Warren Rudman
Republican

Incumbent Democrat John Durkin was defeated by former Attorney General of New Hampshire Warren Rudman in a relatively close election, where nationwide Republicans had a landslide known as the Reagan Revolution.

General election results
Party	Candidate	Votes	%
Republican	Warren Rudman	195,559	52.15%
Democratic	John A. Durkin (incumbent)	179,455	47.85%
Majority		16,104	4.3%
Turnout		375,014	
Republican gain from Democratic			

== New York ==
New York election
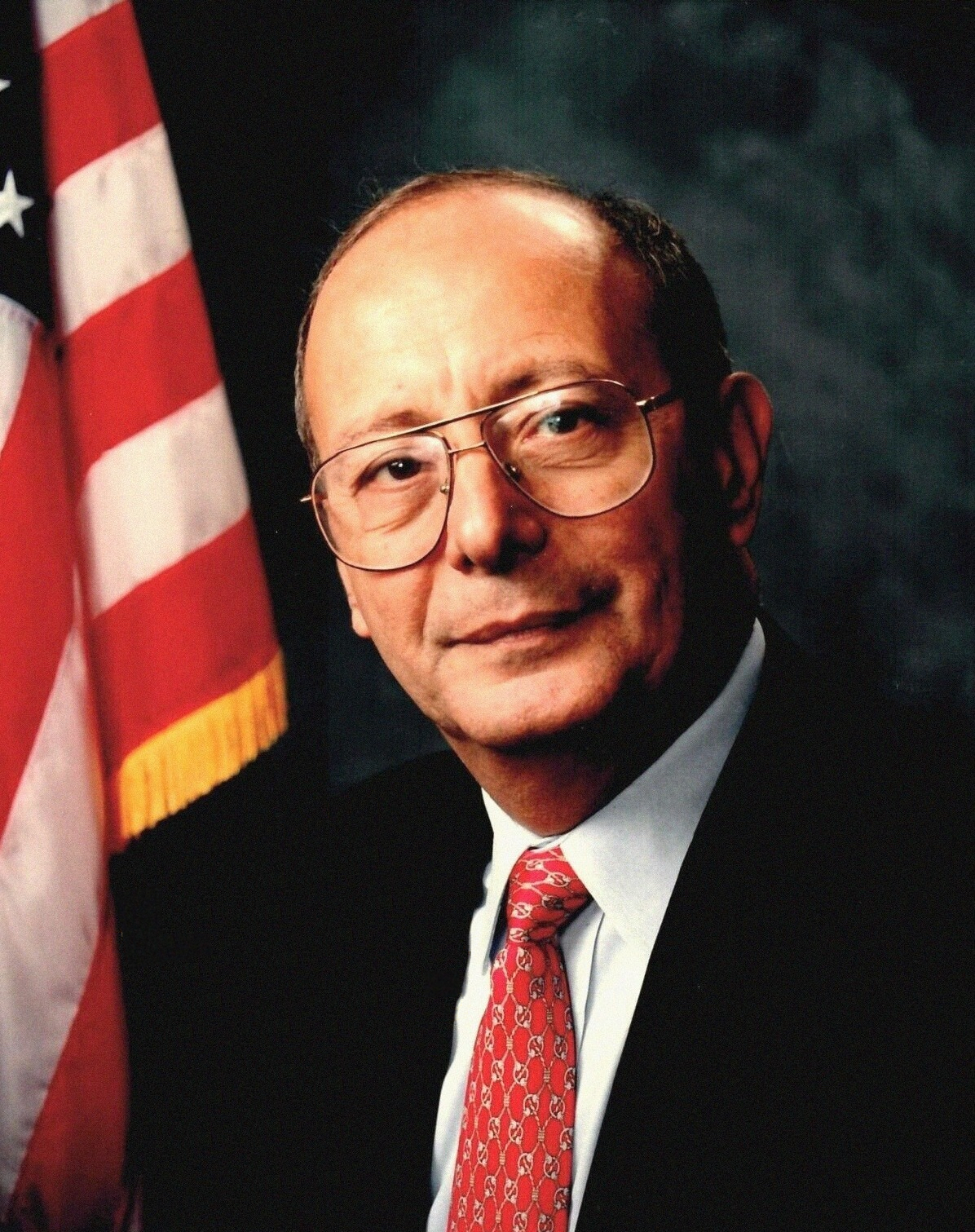

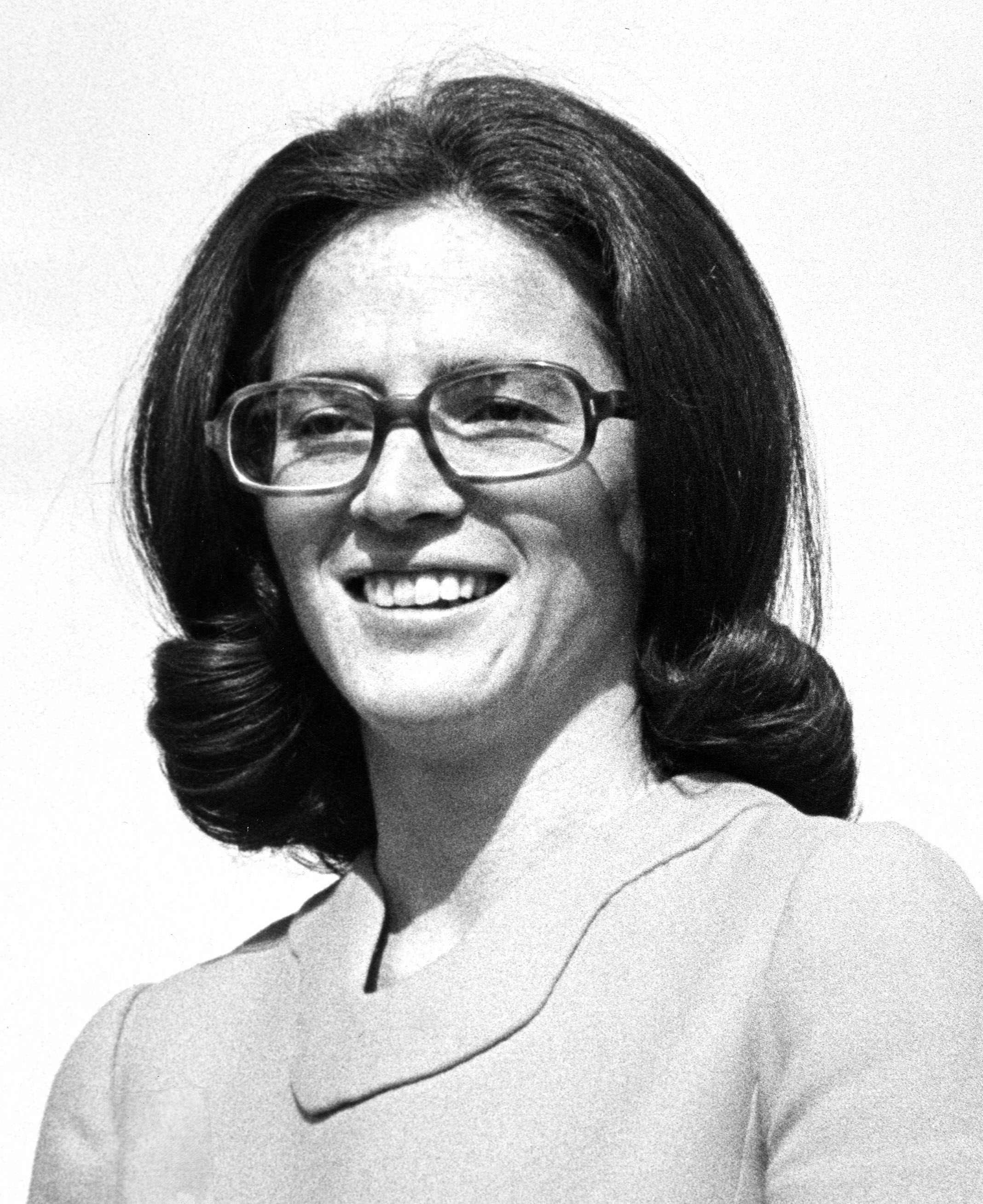

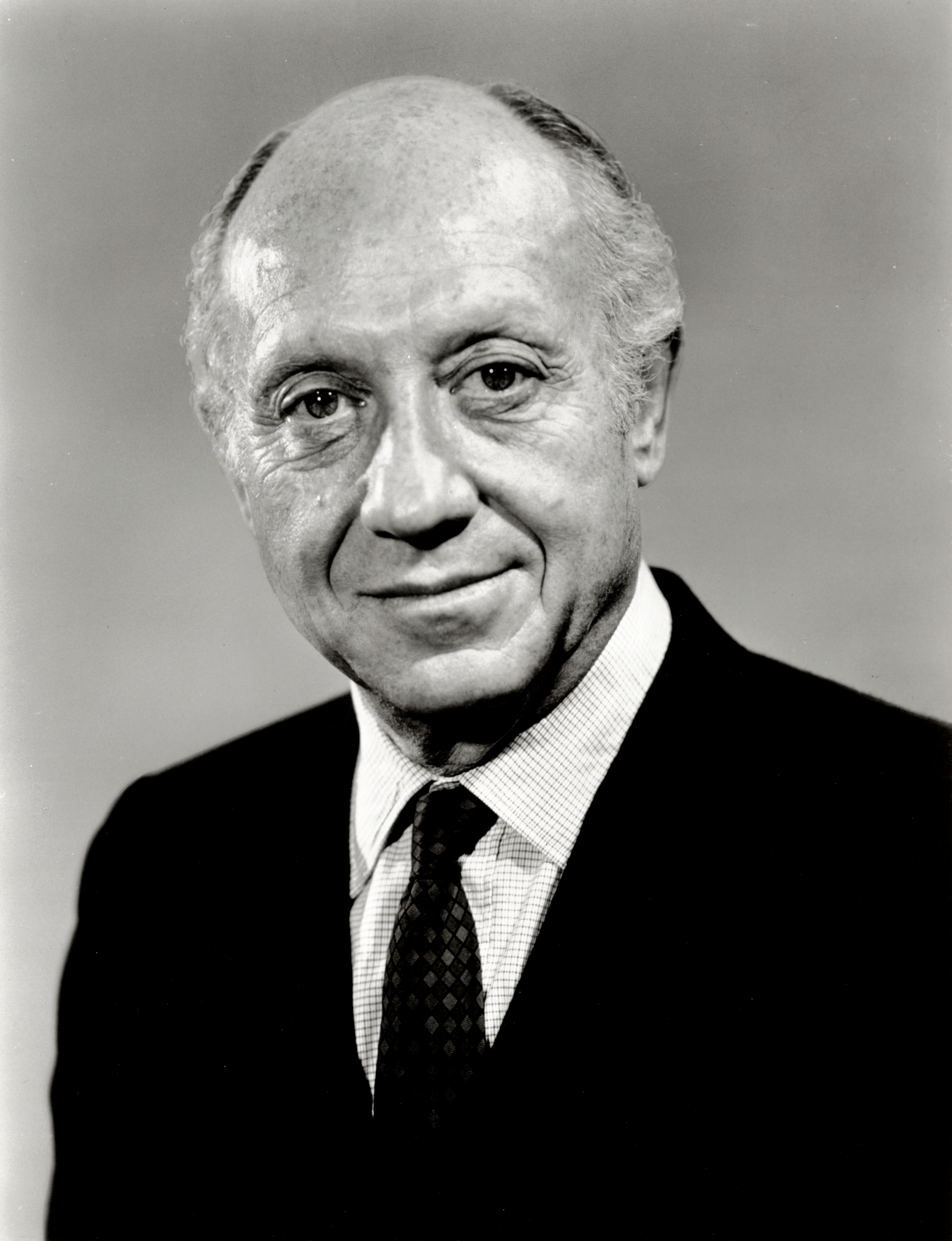
Nominee	Al D'Amato	Elizabeth Holtzman	Jacob K. Javits
Party	Republican	Democratic	Liberal
Popular vote	2,699,652	2,618,661	664,544
Percentage	44.9%	43.5%	11.1%
- County results
U.S. senator before election
Jacob K. Javits
Republican
Elected U.S. senator
Al D'Amato
Republican

Incumbent Republican Jacob K. Javits was defeated in the primary, and Republican Al D'Amato, presiding supervisor of the Town of Hempstead, won the three-way election with Elizabeth Holtzman, U.S. representative.

1980 New York Senate Democratic primary election
Party	Candidate	Votes	%
Democratic	Elizabeth Holtzman	378,567	40.74%
Democratic	Bess Myerson	292,767	31.51%
Democratic	John Lindsay	146,815	15.80%
Democratic	John J. Santucci	36,770	11.96%

Republican primary results
Party	Candidate	Votes	%
Republican	Alfonse M. D'Amato	323,468	55.68%
Republican	Jacob K. Javits (incumbent)	257,433	44.32%
Total votes		580,901	100.00%

Javits's refusal to adjust politically to the rightward movement of his party, as well as his 1979 diagnosis with amyotrophic lateral sclerosis (also known as Lou Gehrig's disease) led to a primary challenge. Javits was defeated in the primary by Hempstead Presiding Supervisor Al D'Amato on September 9.

D'Amato, also running on the Conservative line, proceeded to defeat Democratic U.S. Representative Elizabeth Holtzman and Javits, who ran on the Liberal Party ticket. In the traditionally liberal state of New York, Javits split the Democratic vote with Holtzman to give D'Amato a close victory.

General election results
Party	Candidate	Votes	%
Republican	Alfonse D'Amato	2,272,082	
Conservative	Alfonse D'Amato	275,100	
Right to Life	Alfonse D'Amato	152,470	
Total	Alfonse D'Amato	2,699,652	44.88%
Democratic	Elizabeth Holtzman	2,618,661	43.54%
Liberal	Jacob K. Javits (incumbent)	664,544	11.05%
Libertarian	Richard Savadel	21,465	0.36%
Communist	William R. Scott	4,161	0.07%
Workers World	Thomas Soto	3,643	0.06%
Socialist Workers	Victor A. Nieto	2,715	0.05%
	Write-in votes	73	<0.01%
Majority		80,991	1.34%
Turnout		6,014,914	
Republican hold			

== North Carolina ==
North Carolina election
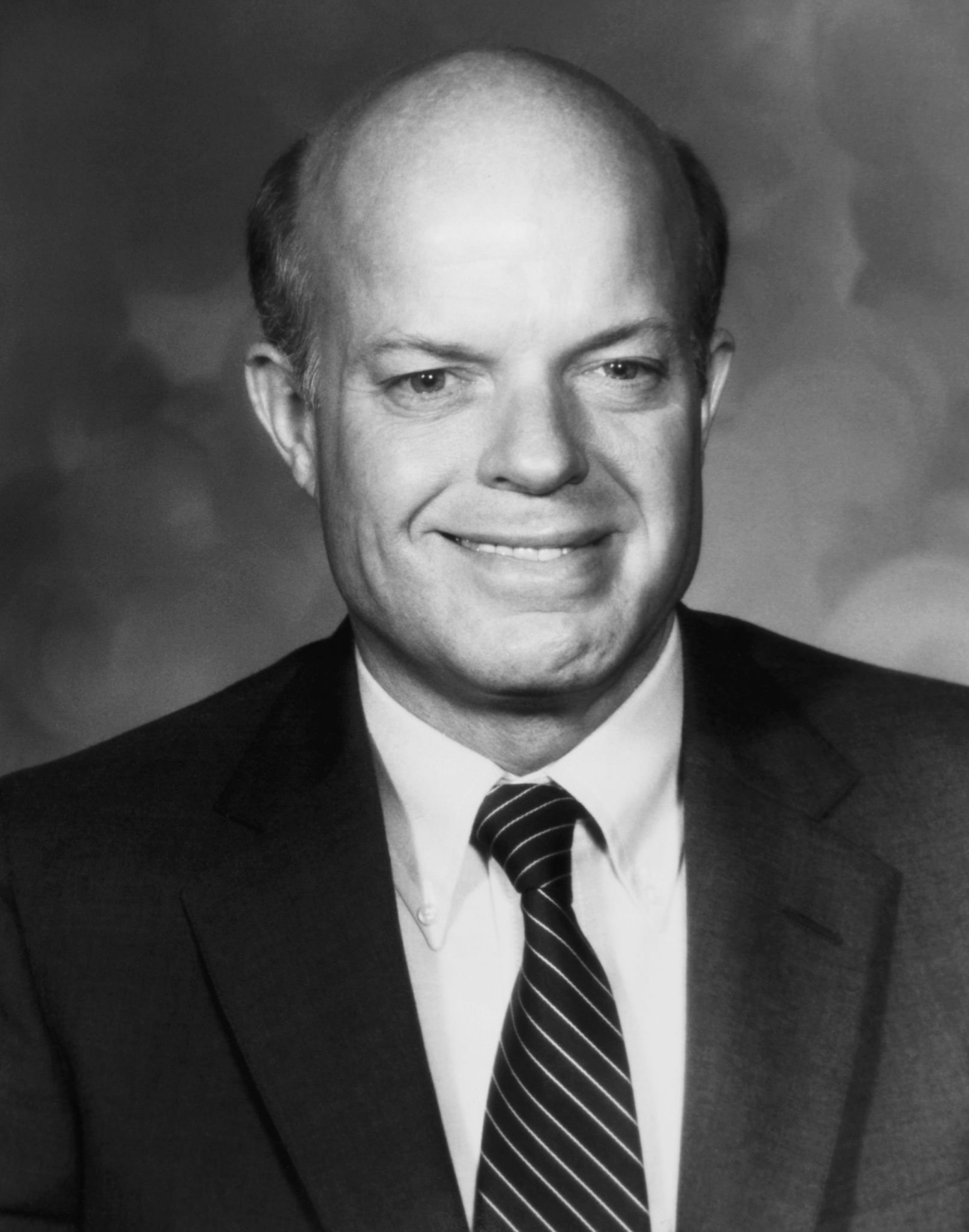

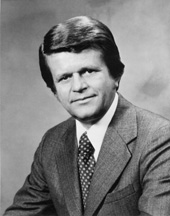
Nominee	John East	Robert Morgan
Party	Republican	Democratic
Popular vote	898,064	887,653
Percentage	50.0%	49.4%
- County results East: 50–60% 60–70% Morgan: 50–60% 60–70% 70–80% 80–90%
U.S. senator before election
Robert Morgan
Democratic
Elected U.S. senator
John East
Republican

Incumbent Democrat Robert Morgan lost re-election a second term to Republican John East, professor at East Carolina University.

1980 North Carolina U.S. Senate election
Party	Candidate	Votes	%	±%
Republican	John East	898,064	49.96%	+12.18%
Democratic	Robert Morgan (incumbent)	887,653	49.38%	−12.39%
Libertarian	F.W. (Rick) Pasotto	7,602	0.04%	
Socialist Workers	Rebecca Finch	4,346	0.02%	
Majority		10,411	0.58%	
Turnout		1,797,655		
Republican gain from Democratic		Swing		

== North Dakota ==
North Dakota election
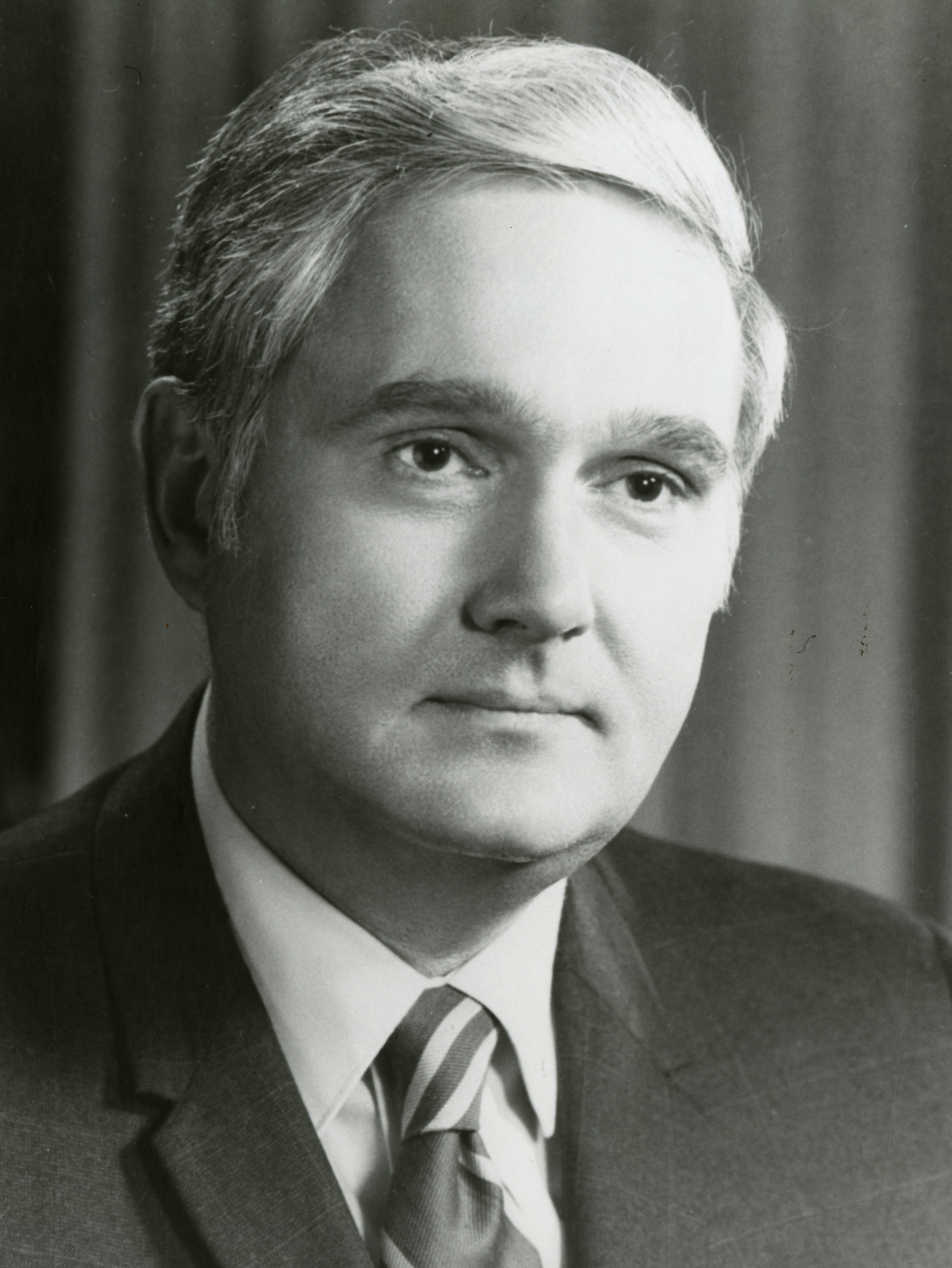

Nominee	Mark Andrews	Kent Johanneson
Party	Republican	Democratic–NPL
Popular vote	210,347	86,658
Percentage	70.29%	28.96%
- County results Andrews: 50–60% 60–70% 70–80% 80–90%
U.S. senator before election
Milton R. Young
Republican
Elected U.S. senator
Mark Andrews
Republican

Incumbent Republican Milton Young was retiring. Republican Mark Andrews defeated North Dakota Democratic-NPL Party candidate Kent Johanneson to fill the vacated seat.

Andrews, who had served as a representative since 1965, easily received the Republican nomination, and the endorsed Democratic-NPL candidate was Kent Johanneson. Andrews and Johanneson won the primary elections for their respective parties.

Two independent candidates, Harley McLain and Don J. Klingensmith, also filed before the deadline, under the Chemical Farming Banned and Statesman parties respectively. McLain would later run for the same seat in 1998 against then incumbent Byron Dorgan.

1980 United States Senate election in North Dakota
Party	Candidate	Votes	%
Republican	Mark Andrews	210,347	70.29%
Democratic	Kent Johanneson	86,658	28.96%
Independent	Harley McLain	1,625	0.54%
Independent	Don J. Klingensmith	642	0.22%
Majority		123,689	41.33%
Turnout		299,272	
Republican hold			

== Ohio ==
Ohio election
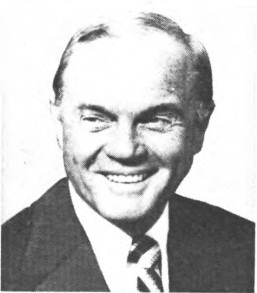

Nominee	John Glenn	Jim Betts
Party	Democratic	Republican
Popular vote	2,770,786	1,137,695
Percentage	68.8%	28.3%
- County results Glenn: 40–50% 50–60% 60–70% 70–80% 80–90% Betts: 50–60%
U.S. senator before election
John Glenn
Democratic
Elected U.S. senator
John Glenn
Democratic

Incumbent Democrat John Glenn won re-election to a second term in a landslide with 69% of the vote over Jim Betts, state representative, coinciding with Ronald Reagan's substantial win in the state during the presidential election.

1980 Ohio United States Senate election
Party	Candidate	Votes	%
Democratic	John Glenn (incumbent)	2,770,786	68.8%
Republican	Jim Betts	1,137,695	28.3%
Independent	John E. Powers	76,412	1.9%
Independent	Rick Nagin	42,410	1.1%
Majority		1,633,091	40.5%
Turnout		4,027,303	
Democratic hold			

== Oklahoma ==
Oklahoma election
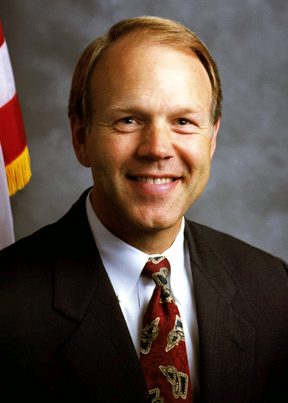

Nominee	Don Nickles	Andy Coats
Party	Republican	Democratic
Popular vote	587,252	400,230
Percentage	53.5%	44.8%
- County results Nickles: 40-50% 50-60% 60-70% 70-80% Coats: 40–50% 50–60% 60–70% 70–80%
U.S. senator before election
Henry Bellmon
Republican
Elected U.S. senator
Don Nickles
Republican

Incumbent Republican Henry Bellmon decided to retire, instead of seeking a third term. Republican nominee Don Nickles won the open seat over Andy Coats, Oklahoma County district attorney.

After two years in the State Senate, and displeased by the policies of the Carter administration, Nickles ran for the United States Senate in 1980 to succeed Republican Henry Bellmon, who was retiring. As an unknown in a field crowded with business and political bigwigs, Nickles was not initially given much of a chance. Bellmon tried to convince him to wait and run for the U.S. House. Utilizing personal contact and passing out unique "wooden nickel" campaign button novelties, Nickles' unique grassroot community ties to local Amway distributors throughout Oklahoma gave him an interpersonal network which proved helpful. Nickles beat two well-funded oil millionaires (Jack Zink and Ed Noble) in the primary, and won the primary run-off against Zink, a race car driver. He later won the general election against Democrat Oklahoma City Mayor Andy Coats and independent Charles Nesbitt, the Oklahoma corporation commissioner and former Oklahoma Attorney General. At the age of 31, Nickles was the youngest Republican ever elected to the U.S. Senate.

General election results
Party	Candidate	Votes	%
Republican	Don Nickles	587,252	53.5%
Democratic	Andy Coats	478,283	43.6%
Independent	Charles R. Nesbitt	21,179	1.9%
Libertarian	Robert T. Murphy	9,757	0.9%
Independent	Paul E. Trent	1,823	0.2%
Majority		108,969	9.9%
Turnout			
Republican hold			

== Oregon ==
Oregon election
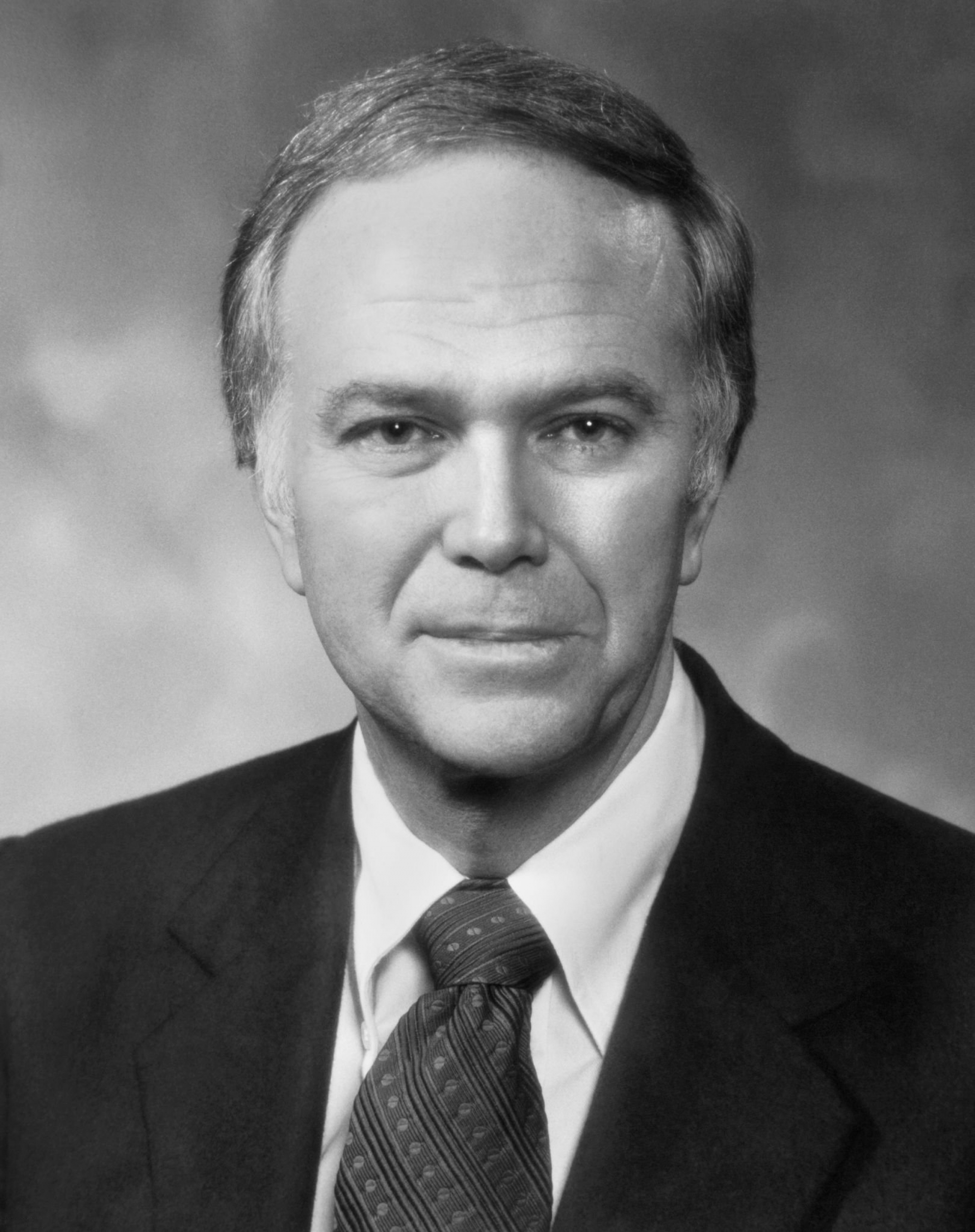

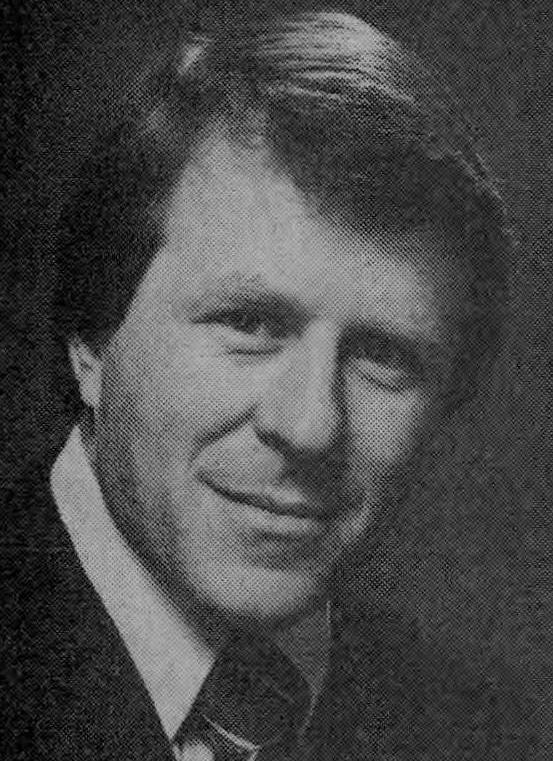
Nominee	Bob Packwood	Ted Kulongoski
Party	Republican	Democratic
Popular vote	594,290	501,963
Percentage	52.1%	44.0%
- County results Packwood: 50-60% 60-70% Kulongoski: 50–60%
U.S. senator before election
Bob Packwood
Republican
Elected U.S. senator
Bob Packwood
Republican

Republican incumbent Bob Packwood was re-elected to a third term, defeating Democratic state senator Ted Kulongoski and Libertarian Tonie Nathan.

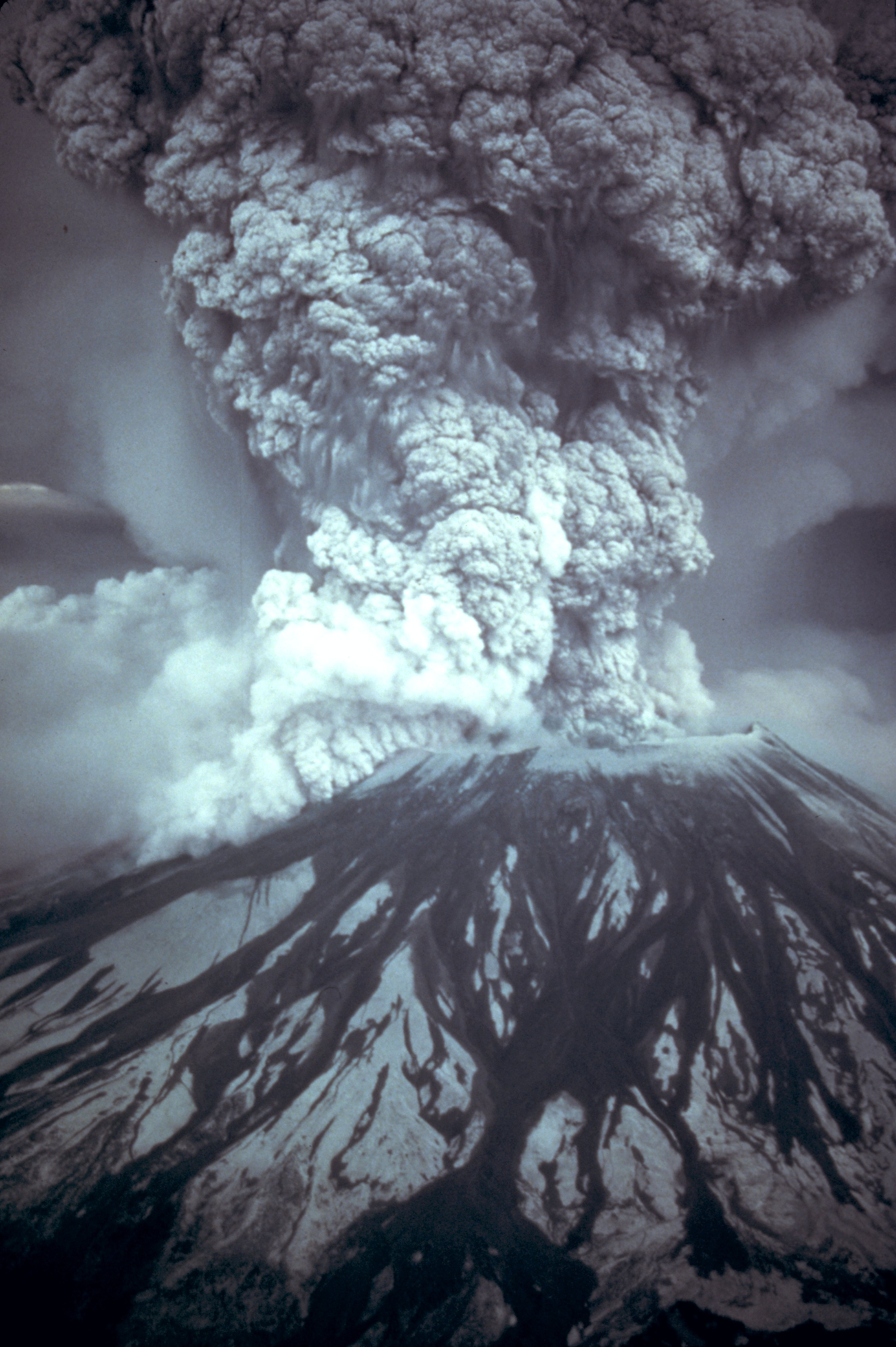
Mount St. Helens erupted two days before the Oregon primaries.

The primary elections were held on May 20, 1980, in conjunction with the Democratic and Republican presidential primaries. Interest in the primaries was somewhat subdued because they occurred just two days after the eruption of Mount St. Helens, about 60 miles (97 km) north of Oregon's most populous city, Portland. The eruption (which was a VEI = 5 event) was the first significant one to occur in the contiguous 48 U.S. states since the 1915 eruption of California's Lassen Peak.

1980 Republican primary for the United States Senate from Oregon
Party	Candidate	Votes	%
Republican	Bob Packwood (incumbent)	191,127	62.43%
Republican	Brenda Jose	45,973	15.02%
Republican	Kenneth Brown	23,599	7.71%
Republican	Rosalie Huss	22,929	7.49%
Republican	William D. Severn	22,281	6.08%
Republican	miscellaneous	227	0.07%
Total votes		306,136	100.00%

1980 Democratic primary for the United States Senate from Oregon
Party	Candidate	Votes	%
Democratic	Ted Kulongoski	161,153	47.66%
Democratic	Charles O. Porter	69,646	20.60%
Democratic	Jack Sumner	46,107	13.64%
Democratic	John Sweeney	39,961	11.82%
Democratic	Gene Arvidson	20,548	6.08%
Democratic	miscellaneous	692	0.21%
Total votes		338,110	100.00%

In addition to the candidates chosen in the primaries, Tonie Nathan was chosen as the Libertarian Party candidate at that party's convention in June. Nathan had been the Libertarian vice presidential candidate in the 1972 presidential election, and was the first woman to ever receive an electoral vote in a U.S. presidential election from a faithless elector who voted for her.

As a well-funded incumbent, Packwood was expected to have a fairly easy road to re-election, and led by double digit margins in most early polls. Packwood chose defense spending as his key issue in the campaign, while Kulongoski focused on the economy and unemployment. Nathan hammered at core Libertarian principles of limited government, with a goal of 5% of the votes, which would keep the party as a valid minor party. The three candidates agreed to three debates, to be held across the state in the summer of 1980. As the challenger, Kulongoski aggressively attempted to engage Packwood in the debates, but the debate format did not allow the candidates to ask follow-up questions or rebut each other's statements, and Packwood was largely able to avoid confrontation and stay above the fray. As the campaign wore on, Kulongoski grew more confident and tried to appeal to Oregonians' independent values by saying that Packwood's enormous cash advantage was due to "eastern" money.

Kulongoski closed to within a few points in some late polls, but with no mistakes made by Packwood and with the coattail effect of Ronald Reagan's presidential victory, the incumbent achieved an electoral majority and a fairly comfortable 8-point margin over Kulongoski. Nathan finished with less than 4% of the vote, short of her goal of 5%. With Republicans taking control of the Senate, Packwood was in line to become chairman of the Senate Commerce Committee. Fellow Oregon Republican Senator Mark Hatfield was also elevated to chairman of the Senate Appropriations Committee, giving Oregon power in the Senate it had never seen before.

1980 United States Senate election in Oregon
Party	Candidate	Votes	%
Republican	Bob Packwood (incumbent)	594,290	52.13%
Democratic	Ted Kulongoski	501,963	44.03%
Libertarian	Tonie Nathan	43,686	3.83%
Total votes		1,139,939	100.00%
Republican hold			

== Pennsylvania ==
Pennsylvania election
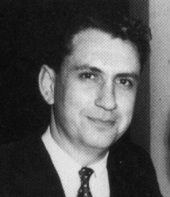

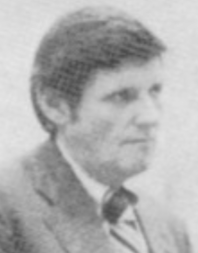
Nominee	Arlen Specter	Pete Flaherty
Party	Republican	Democratic
Popular vote	2,230,404	2,122,391
Percentage	50.5%	48.0%
- County results Specter: 50–60% 60–70% 70–80% Flaherty: 50–60% 60-70% 70–80%
U.S. senator before election
Richard Schweiker
Republican
Elected U.S. senator
Arlen Specter
Republican

Incumbent Republican Richard Schweiker decided to retire, instead of seeking a third term. Republican nominee Arlen Specter won the open seat, defeating Democratic nominee Peter F. Flaherty, former maayor of Pittsburgh.

Arlen Specter, formerly a member of the Democratic party, had served as legal counsel to the Warren Commission, which investigated the 1963 assassination of President John F. Kennedy, after which he became district attorney of Philadelphia. After he was defeated in a 1967 run for mayor of Philadelphia, Specter was defeated in his bid for a third term as district attorney. He had run in the Republican primary in the 1976 Senate election, but was defeated by John Heinz. He ran in the 1978 gubernatorial election, but was defeated by Dick Thornburgh in the primary. Shortly after Specter opened a law practice in Atlantic City, New Jersey, incumbent Republican Richard Schweiker unexpectedly announced his decision not to seek re-election to his seat. Specter, believing his reputation as a political moderate would help him in the general election, decided to run. In the Republican primary, Specter faced state Senator Edward Howard, as well as Delaware County Councilman Bud Haabestad, who was endorsed by Schweiker, then-governor Thornburgh and John Heinz. Specter ultimately defeated Haabestad, his most prominent challenger, by approximately 37,000 votes.

In the Democratic primary, former Pittsburgh Mayor Peter Flaherty contended with state Representative Joseph Rhodes Jr., former U.S. Representative Edward Mezvinsky, state Senator H. Craig Lewis and Dean of Temple University Law School Peter J. Liacouras. Flaherty's name recognition enabled him to defeat his primary opponents, winning every county and thus winning the Democratic nomination.

Flaherty employed a general election strategy he had used in two previous statewide office campaigns: win by a wide margin in the southwestern part of the state, and narrowly win Philadelphia. He also hoped to carry several swing towns vi support from several labor unions. Specter hoped to carry his hometown of Philadelphia, despite the Democrats' 7–2 voter registration advantage there. To this end, Specter sought endorsements among city Democratic leadership, including future mayor John F. Street. Specter hoped that, with wins in suburban areas and the heavily Republican central portion of the state, in addition to winning Philadelphia, he would be able to win the election. Specter distanced himself from Governor Dick Thornburgh, who had become unpopular in some demographics due to his proposals to decrease welfare program spending.

In the end, Specter defeated Flaherty by approximately 108,000 votes, carrying Philadelphia and its suburbs as well as the central and northeastern portions of the state. Flaherty performed strongest in the western portion of the state, including Cambria, Clarion, Erie and Mercer counties.

1980 Pennsylvania United States Senate election
Party	Candidate	Votes	%
Republican	Arlen Specter	2,230,404	50.48%
Democratic	Peter F. Flaherty	2,122,391	48.04%
Socialist Workers	Linda Mohrbacher	27,229	0.62%
Libertarian	David K. Walter	18,595	0.42%
Consumer	Lee Frissell	16,089	0.36%
Communist	Frank Kinces	3,334	0.08%
Majority		108,013	2.44%
Turnout		4,418,042	
Republican hold			

== South Carolina ==
South Carolina election
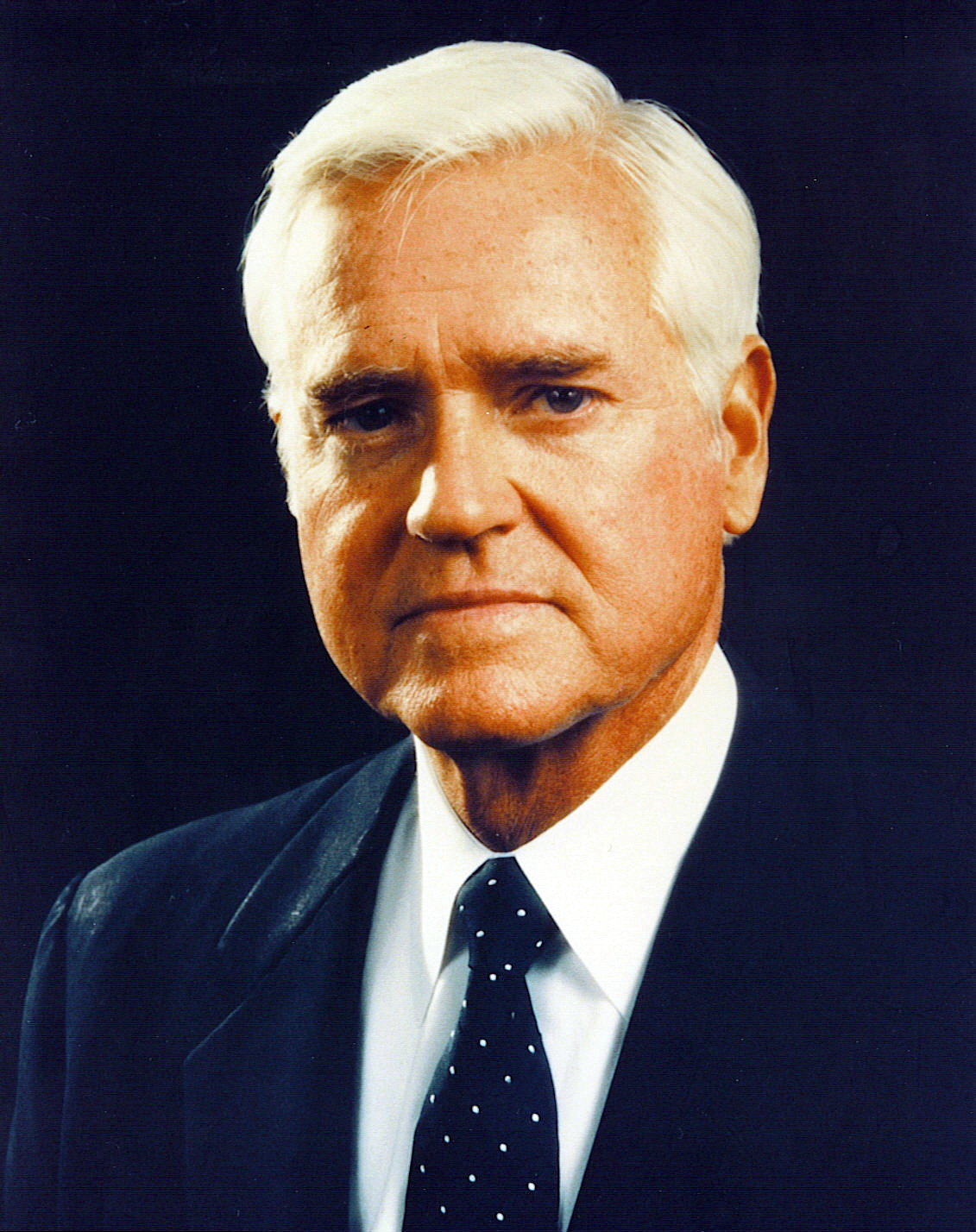

Nominee	Ernest Hollings	Marshall Mays
Party	Democratic	Republican
Popular vote	612,556	257,946
Percentage	70.4%	29.6%
- County results Hollings: 50–60% 60–70% 70–80% 80–90%
U.S. senator before election
Fritz Hollings
Democratic
Elected U.S. senator
Ernest Hollings
Democratic

Incumbent Democratic senator Fritz Hollings easily defeated Republican challenger Marshall Mays to win his fourth (his third full) term.

South Carolina Democratic primary election
Party	Candidate	Votes	%
Democratic	Fritz Hollings (incumbent)	266,796	81.2%
Democratic	Nettie Durant Dickerson	34,720	10.6%
Democratic	William P. Kreml	27,049	8.2%

South Carolina Republican primary election
Party	Candidate	Votes	%
Republican	Marshall Mays	14,075	42.6%
Republican	Charlie Rhodes	11,395	34.5%
Republican	Robert Carley	7,575	22.9%

South Carolina Republican primary election runoff
Party	Candidate	Votes	%	±%
Republican	Marshall Mays	6,853	64.8%	+22.2%
Republican	Charlie Rhodes	3,717	35.2%	+0.7%

South Carolina general election
Party	Candidate	Votes	%	±%
Democratic	Fritz Hollings (incumbent)	612,556	70.4%	+1.0%
Republican	Marshall Mays	257,946	29.6%	+0.9%
No party	Write-Ins	94	0.0%	0.0%
Majority		354,610	40.8%	+0.1%
Turnout		870,596	70.5%	+19.2%
Democratic hold				

== South Dakota ==
South Dakota election
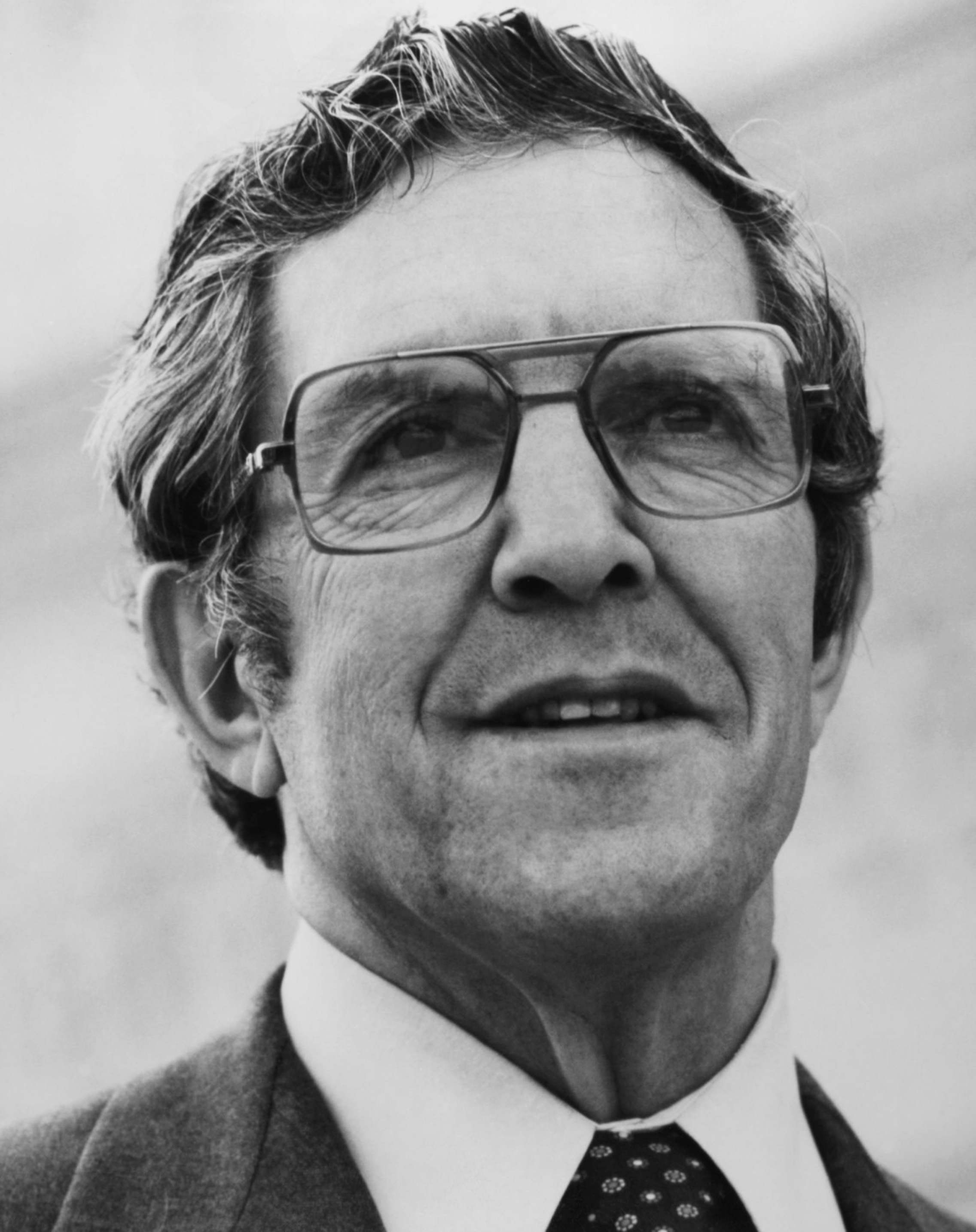

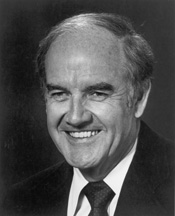
Nominee	James Abdnor	George McGovern
Party	Republican	Democratic
Popular vote	190,594	129,018
Percentage	58.2%	39.4%
- County results Abdnor: 40-50% 50-60% 60-70% 70-80% 80-90% McGovern: 50–60% 60–70% 70–80%
U.S. senator before election
George McGovern
Democratic
Elected U.S. senator
James Abdnor
Republican

Incumbent Democrat George McGovern ran for re-election to a fourth term, but was defeated by Republican James Abdnor, U.S. representative.

Democratic primary results
Party	Candidate	Votes	%
Democratic	George McGovern (incumbent)	44,822	62.44%
Democratic	Larry Schumaker	26,958	37.56%
Total votes		71,780	100.00%

Republican primary results
Party	Candidate	Votes	%
Republican	James Abdnor	68,196	72.93%
Republican	Dale Bell	25,314	27.07%
Total votes		93,510	100.00%

McGovern was one of several liberal Democratic U.S. senators targeted for defeat in 1980 by the National Conservative Political Action Committee (NCPAC), which put out a year's worth of negative portrayals of McGovern. They and other anti-abortion groups especially focused on McGovern's support for pro-choice abortion laws. McGovern faced a Democratic primary challenge for the first time, from an anti-abortion candidate.

Abdnor, a four-term incumbent congressman who held identical positions to McGovern on farm issues, was solidly conservative on national issues, and was well liked within the state. Abdnor's campaign focused on both McGovern's liberal voting record and what it said was McGovern's lack of involvement in South Dakotan affairs. McGovern made an issue of NCPAC's outside involvement, and that group eventually withdrew from the campaign after Abdnor denounced a letter they had sent out. Far behind in the polls earlier, McGovern outspent Abdnor 2-to-1, hammered away at Abdnor's refusal to debate him (drawing attention to a slight speech defect Abdnor had), and, showing the comeback pattern of some of his past races in the state, closed the gap for a while.

However, in the general election, McGovern was solidly defeated, getting only 39 percent of the vote to Abdnor's 58 percent. McGovern became one of many Democratic casualties of that year's Republican sweep, which became known as the "Reagan Revolution".

General election results
Party	Candidate	Votes	%	±%
Republican	James Abdnor	190,594	58.20%	+11.24%
Democratic	George McGovern (incumbent)	129,018	39.40%	–13.65%
Independent	Wayne Peterson	7,866	2.40%	
Majority		61,576	18.80%	+12.72%
Turnout		327,478		
Republican gain from Democratic		Swing		

== Utah ==
Utah election
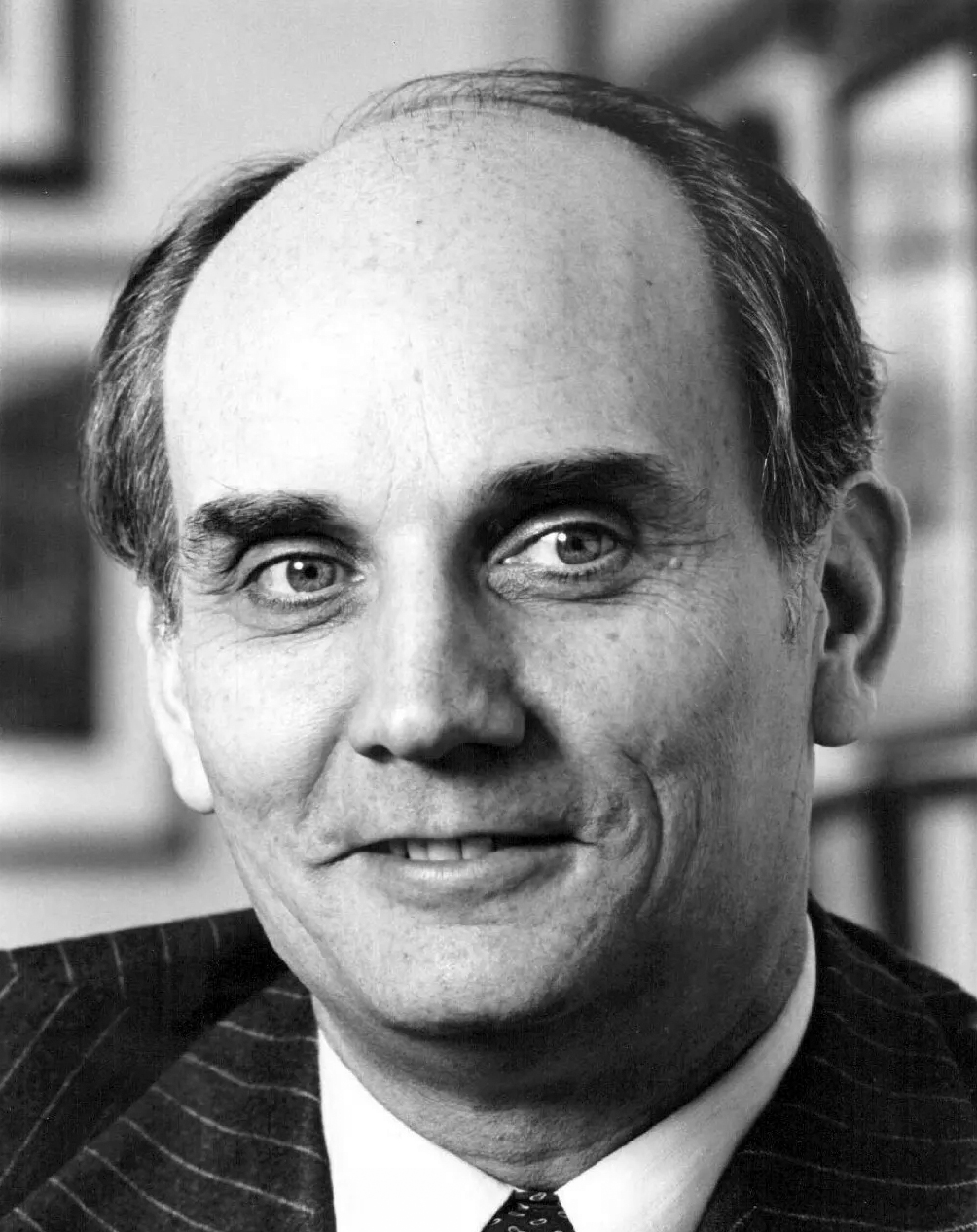

Nominee	Jake Garn	Dan Berman
Party	Republican	Democratic
Popular vote	437,675	151,454
Percentage	73.65%	25.49%
- County results Garn: 60-70% 70-80% 80-90% Berman: 50–60%
U.S. senator before election
Jake Garn
Republican
Elected U.S. Senator
Jake Garn
Republican

Incumbent Republican Jake Garn ran successfully for reelection to a second term in the United States Senate, defeating Democrat Dan Berman.

1980 United States Senate election in Utah
Party	Candidate	Votes	%
Republican	Jake Garn (incumbent)	437,675	73.65%
Democratic	Dan Berman	151,454	25.48%
Independent	Bruce Bangerter	3,186	0.54%
American	George M. Batchelor	1,983	0.33%
Majority		286,221	48.17%
Turnout		594,298	
Republican hold			

== Vermont ==
Vermont election
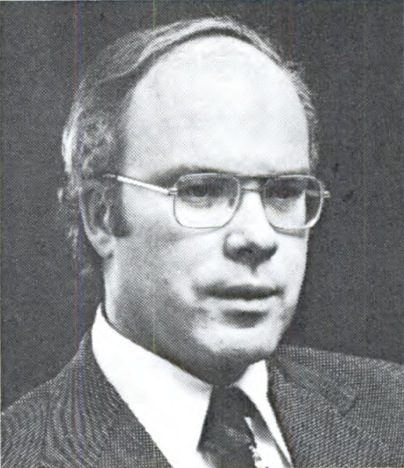

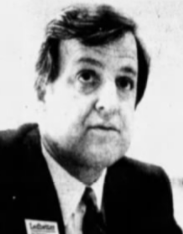
Nominee	Patrick Leahy	Stewart M. Ledbetter
Party	Democratic	Republican
Popular vote	104,089	101,647
Percentage	49.8%	48.6%
- Leahy: 40-50% 50-60% 60-70% 70-80% Ledbetter: 40-50% 50-60% 60-70% 70-80% 80-90%
U.S. senator before election
Patrick Leahy
Democratic
Elected U.S. senator
Patrick Leahy
Democratic

Incumbent Democrat Patrick Leahy ran successfully for reelection to a second term in the United States Senate, defeating Stewart M. Ledbetter in the closest race of his senatorial career.

Democratic primary results
Party	Candidate	Votes	%
Democratic	Patrick Leahy (incumbent)	27,548	97.5%
Democratic	Other	696	2.5%
Total votes		'28,244'	'100.0%'

Republican primary results
Party	Candidate	Votes	%
Republican	Stewart M. Ledbetter	16,518	35.3%
Republican	James E. Mullin	12,256	26.2%
Republican	Tom Evslin	8,575	18.3%
Republican	T. Garry Buckley	5,209	11.1%
Republican	Robert Schuettinger	3,450	7.4%
Republican	Anthony N. Doria	496	1.1%
Republican	Other	316	0.7%
Total votes		'46,820'	'100.0%'

Liberty Union primary results
Party	Candidate	Votes	%
Liberty Union	Earl S. Gardner	135	80.4%
Liberty Union	Other	33	19.6%
Total votes		'168'	'100.0%'

1980 United States Senate election in Vermont
Party	Candidate	Votes	%
Democratic	Patrick Leahy (incumbent)	104,089	49.8%
Republican	Stewart M. Ledbetter	101,647	48.6%
Independent	Anthony N. Doria	1,764	0.8%
Liberty Union	Earl S. Gardner	1,578	0.8%
N/A	Other	110	0.0%
Majority		2,755	1.32%
Total votes		209,188	100.0%
Democratic hold			

== Washington ==
Washington election
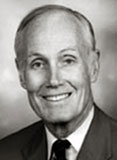

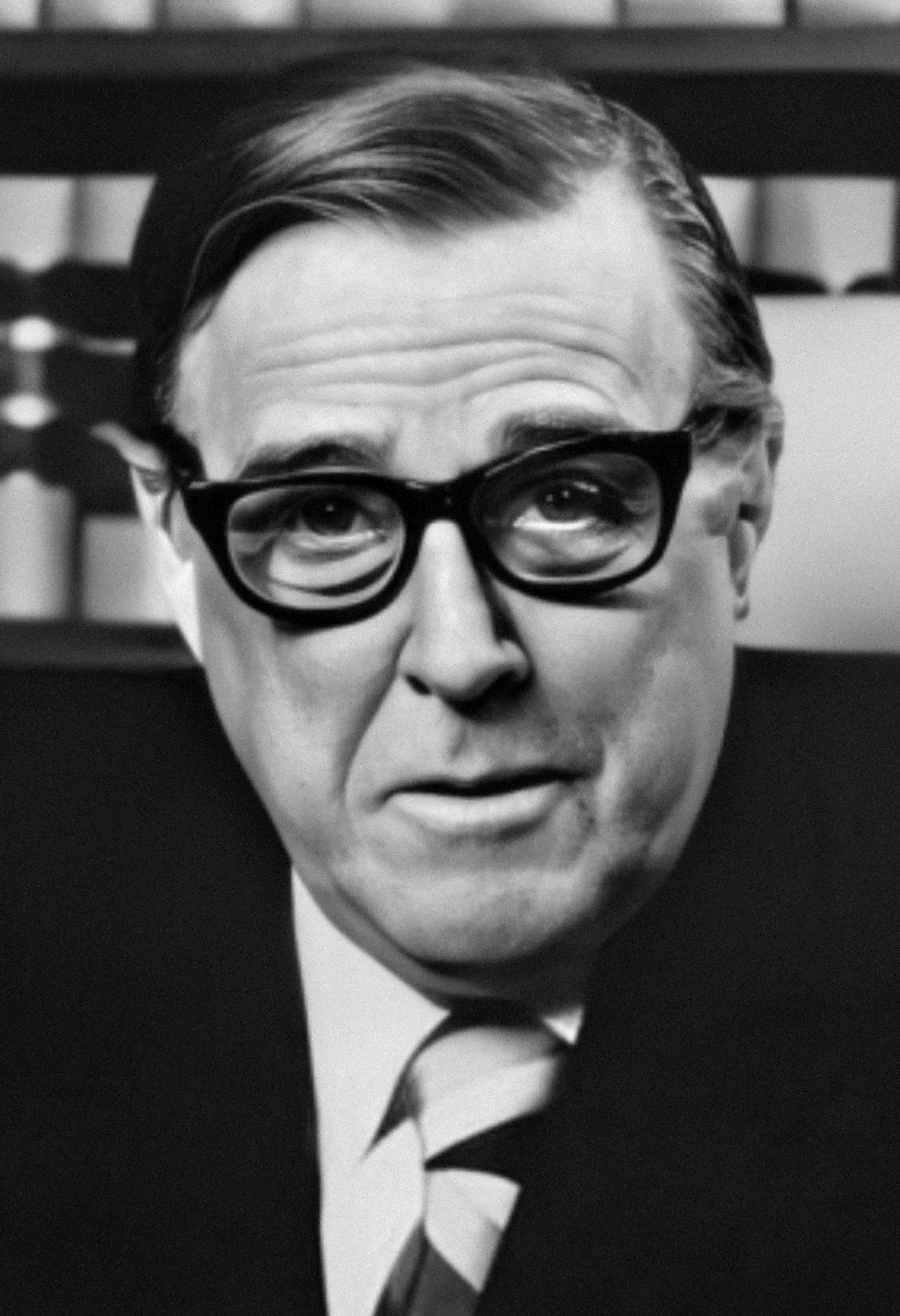
Nominee	Slade Gorton	Warren Magnuson
Party	Republican	Democratic
Popular vote	936,317	792,052
Percentage	54.2%	45.8%
- County results Gorton: 50–60% 60–70% Magnuson: 50–60%
U.S. senator before election
Warren Magnuson
Democratic
Elected U.S. senator
Slade Gorton
Republican

Incumbent Democrat Warren Magnuson lost re-election to State Attorney General Slade Gorton.

General election results
Party	Candidate	Votes	%
Republican	Slade Gorton	936,317	54.2%
Democratic	Warren Magnuson (incumbent)	792,052	45.8%
Majority		144,265	8.4%
Total votes		1,728,369	100.0%
Republican gain from Democratic			

== Wisconsin ==
Wisconsin election
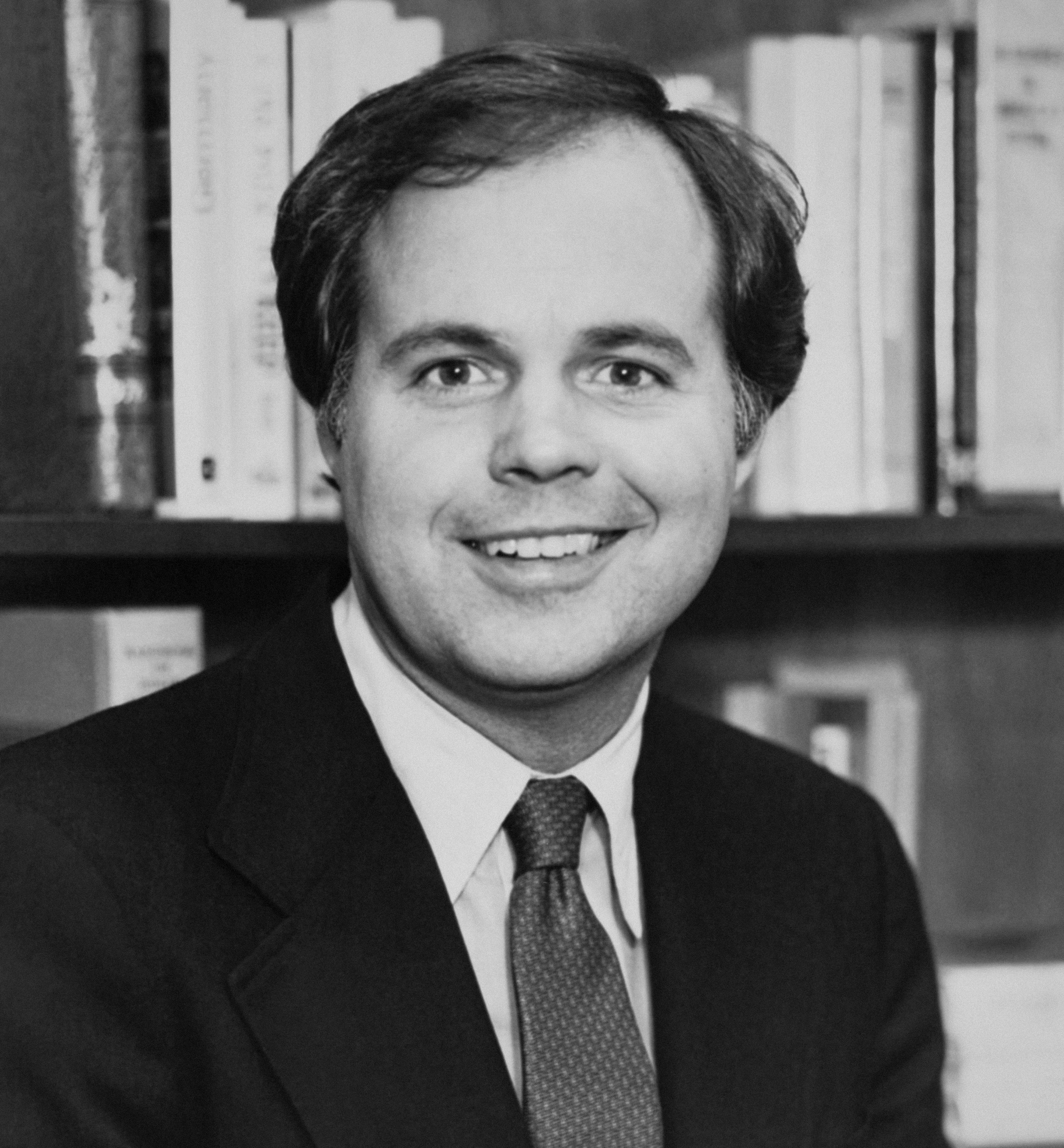

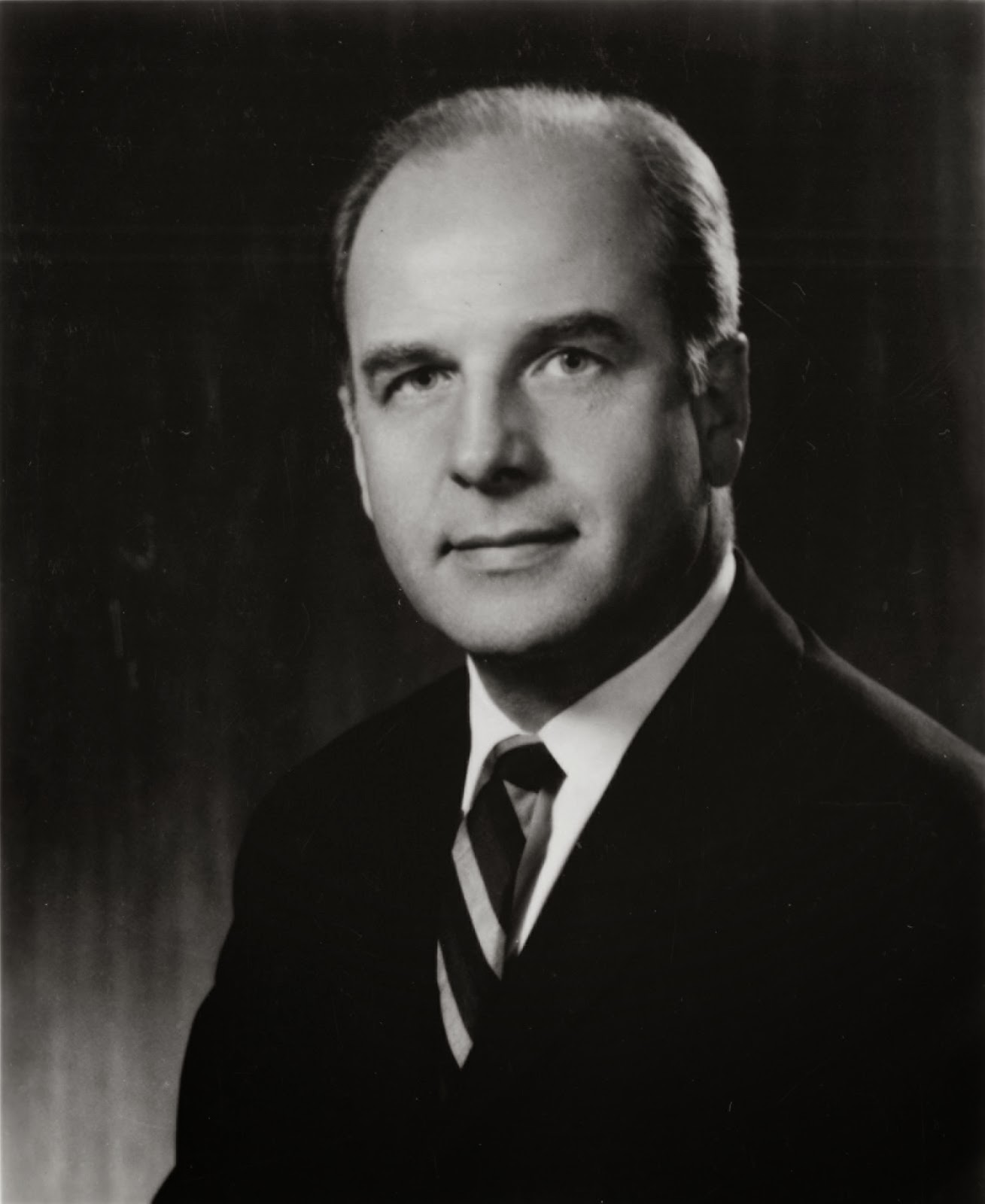
Nominee	Bob Kasten	Gaylord Nelson
Party	Republican	Democratic
Popular vote	1,106,311	1,065,487
Percentage	50.2%	48.3%
- County results Kasten: 50–60% 60–70% Nelson: 50–60% 60–70% 70–80%
U.S. senator before election
Gaylord Nelson
Democratic
Elected U.S. senator
Bob Kasten
Republican

Incumbent Democrat Gaylord Nelson ran for re-election to a fourth term, but was defeated by Bob Kasten, former U.S. representative from Wisconsin's 9th congressional district (1975–1979).

General election results
Party	Candidate	Votes	%
Republican	Bob Kasten	1,106,311	50.44%
Democratic	Gaylord Nelson (incumbent)	1,065,487	48.34%
Constitution	James P. Wickstrom	16,156	0.73%
Libertarian	Bervin J. Larson	9,679	0.44%
Socialist Workers	Susan Hagen	6,502	0.30%
Majority		40,284	1.85%
Turnout		2,204,135	
Republican gain from Democratic			

== See also ==
- 1980 United States elections
  - 1980 United States gubernatorial elections
  - 1980 United States presidential election
  - 1980 United States House of Representatives elections
- 96th United States Congress
- 97th United States Congress

== Sources ==
- Marano, Richard Michael (2003). Vote Your Conscience: The Last Campaign of George McGovern. Praeger Publishers. ISBN 0-275-97189-9.
- State Election Commission (1981). Report of the South Carolina Election Commission for the Period Ending June 30, 1981. Columbia, SC: State of South Carolina. pp. 30, 33, 35, 37.
