= US Senate career of Huey Long =

Congressional career of American politician

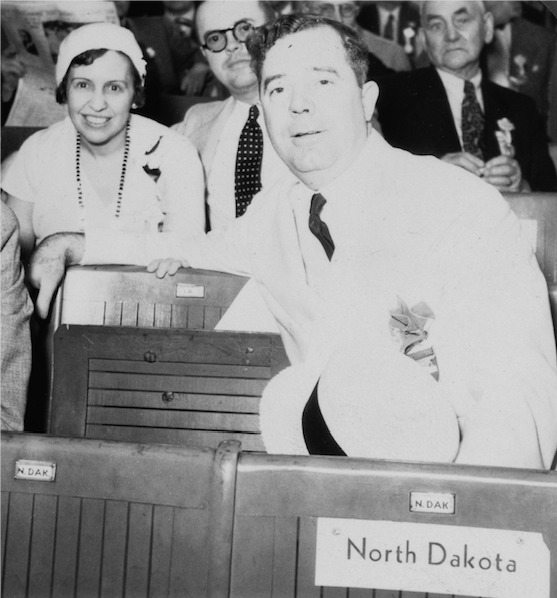
Long in the Senate

Huey Long, the former governor of Louisiana, served in the United States Senate from 1932 until his assassination in 1935. A powerful figure, Long was integral in Franklin Roosevelt's 1932 Democratic Nomination and the election of the first woman, Hattie Caraway, to the US Senate. He was investigated for election discrepancies regarding the election of his friend John H. Overton, but no evidence of fraud was found. He proposed sweeping legislation, known as the Share Our Wealth plan, to end the Great Depression. Long often used filibusters to prevent or slow the passage of New Deal legislation.

During his tenure, Long was an avowed isolationist and claimed that American foreign policy in Latin America was influenced by Standard Oil and Wall Street. He opposed American entry into World Court and criticized American involvement in the Spanish–American War and World War I.

== Activities ==
=== Arrival ===
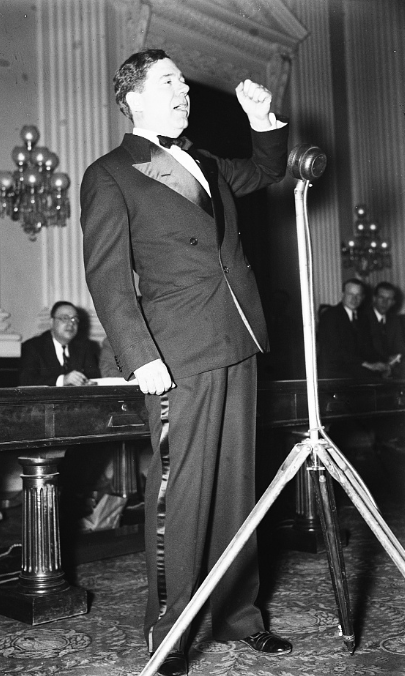
Long delivering a speech

At the time of Long's arrival in the Senate, America was in the throes of the Great Depression, worsened by Republican President Herbert Hoover's handling of the crisis. With this backdrop, Long made characteristically fiery speeches that denounced the concentration of wealth in the hands of a few. He criticized the leaders of both parties for failing to address the crisis adequately, most notably attacking conservative Senate Democratic Leader Joseph Robinson of Arkansas for his apparent closeness with President Herbert Hoover and ties to big business.

=== Caraway ===
Not discouraged after being snubbed, Long found other venues for his populist message. He endorsed Senator Hattie Caraway of Arkansas, a widow and the underdog candidate in a crowded field, and conducted a whirlwind, seven-day tour of that state. (Note: According to Brinkley, "Long's reasons for this decision were not entirely clear." Long himself noted that he felt a chivalric impulse to help this "brave little woman" and that Caraway was one of the only other senators to vote for his many wealth-limiting proposals. Long also appreciated that she often voted against her senior Arkansas Senator Robinson. However, many observers speculate that Long's true intent was to further establish a national reputation for himself. The New York Times contemporarily suggested that he was plotting to "yield him control of the [Senate] minority – or perhaps the majority". Brinkley claims that it was Long's first effort to propel himself to national leadership, which required him to directly appeal to the people rather than through political channels in Washington.) During the campaign, nicknamed the "Hattie and Huey Tour", Long gave 39 speeches, traveled 2,100 miles, and spoke to over 200,000 people. In an upset win over a Robinson-endorsed candidate, Caraway became the first woman elected to a full-term in the Senate, largely thanks to Long.

Caraway would later become the first woman to chair a committee (1933), to stand in for the floor leader (1940), and to preside over the Senate (1944).

=== Overton ===
In 1932, as Long expanded his power in Louisiana, he endorsed friend John H. Overton for the US Senate in a primary effort against incumbent Edwin S. Broussard, whom Long denounced as "one of Wall Street's own". Overton won the primary in a landslide, carrying over 59% of the vote and 48 parishes. Broussard alleged voter fraud by Long's political machine and demanded an investigation. A special committee found no evidence of widespread voter fraud and seated Overton.

=== Public image ===
Returning to Washington, Long gave theatrical speeches which drew wide attention. Public viewing areas were crowded with onlookers, among them a young Lyndon B. Johnson, who later claimed he was "simply entranced" by Long. Long sometimes spent weeks obstructing bills, launching hour-long filibusters and having the Senate registrar read superfluous documents. Long's antics, one editorial claimed, had made the Senate "impotent". In May 1932, The Washington Post called for his resignation. Outside the Capitol, his vulgar behavior was well publicized at a 1933 charity dinner in Long Island, to which he arrived already intoxicated. According to Time, "Spotting a plump girl with a full plate before her, he marched to her table, snatched the plate from her, yapped: 'You're too fat already. I'll eat this.'" Long's night culminated in him urinating on a man in the restroom. The man punched Long, giving him a black-eye. When asked about the injury, Long claimed that four men had ambushed him. This and Long's radical rhetoric did little to endear him to his fellow senators. Not one of his proposed bills, resolutions or motions was passed during his three years in the Senate despite an overwhelming Democratic majority. During one debate, another senator told Long, "I do not believe you could get the Lord's Prayer endorsed in this body." Fellow Senator Carter Glass said of Long, "I understand that in the ultimate decadence of Rome they elected a horse to the Senate. At least it was a whole horse." Long's flamboyant ways and populist style made him one of the best known senators in the nation. Regarding his unrefined behavior, historian David M. Kennedy wrote:

"Long strode into the national arena in the role of the hillbilly hero and played it with gusto. He wore white silk suits and pink silk ties, womanized openly, swilled whiskey in the finest bars, swaggered his way around Washington, and breathed defiance into the teeth of his critics. The president's mother called him 'that awful man'. His friends called him 'the Kingfish', after a character on the radio program Amos 'n' Andy ('Der Kingfish', said Long's critics, seeing parallels with another dangerous demagogue.) The New York Times called him 'a man with a front of brass and lungs of leather'."

== Roosevelt and the New Deal ==
=== New Deal legislation ===
==== National recovery Act ====
Long opposed the National Recovery Act, denouncing it as a sellout to big business. On the Senate floor, he attacked the bill as having "every fault of socialism" yet not "one of its virtues". He claimed, correctly, that its wage and price codes would be created by, and in the favor of, industrialists. Long also demanded the retention of a provision, opposed by Roosevelt, that required Senate confirmation for the NRA's senior employees. Long feared that the provision's absence would allow his political enemies to gain positions of power within Louisiana.

In an attempt to prevent its passage, Long held a lone filibuster, speaking for 15 hours and 30 minutes, the second longest filibuster at the time. During the filibuster, he read and analyzed each section of the Constitution, which he claimed the New Deal was turning into "ancient and forgotten lore". After responding to notes given by reporters, Long then explained his recipes for fried oysters and potlikker until he yielded at 4 am. His attempts were in vain, and the act established the National Recovery Administration (NRA), which Long quickly nicknamed "Nuts Running America".

==== Social Security ====
Long criticized Social Security, calling it inadequate and expressing his concerns that states would administer it in a way discriminatory to blacks. In 1933, he was a leader of a three-week Senate filibuster against the Glass banking bill for favoring the interests of national banks over state banks. He later supported the Glass–Steagall Act, after provisions were made to extend government deposit insurance to state banks as well as national banks.

==== Other legislation ====
Long supported other New Deal legislation, such as the acts that established the Civilian Conservation Corps and the Tennessee Valley Authority. He voted with the administration on major tax and tariff bills and on the repeal of Prohibition. On other occasions, Long even compromised with Roosevelt. On banking bills, Long was key in adding amendments that limited branch banking and ensured federally insured bank deposits.

Long failed in his attempt to add an amendment to the Agricultural Adjustment Act that would have remonetized silver.

Long was one of only 13 senators who voted against the Government Economy Act, which cut government salaries and veteran benefits.

=== Relationship with Roosevelt ===
"Whenever this administration has gone to the left I have voted for it, and whenever it has gone to the right I have voted against it."

— Huey Long on Roosevelt's policies

In the presidential election of 1932, Long became a vocal supporter of New York Governor Franklin Delano Roosevelt. He believed Roosevelt to be the only candidate willing and able to carry out the drastic redistribution of wealth that Long believed was necessary to end the Great Depression. At the 1932 Democratic National Convention, Long was instrumental in keeping the delegations of several wavering southern states in the Roosevelt camp. His appeal for the delegates to support Roosevelt was noted for its eloquence. The New York Times' Washington correspondent described Long's speech as "the finest legal argument that anybody has ever heard – or that I ever heard – at a national convention". Senator Burton Wheeler of Montana claimed that, "Roosevelt would never have won the Democratic nomination in 1932, in my opinion, but for Huey Long." Bronx County boss Edward J. Flynn shared a similar sentiment: "There is no question in my mind... that without Long's work Roosevelt might not have been nominated." Due to this, Long expected to be featured prominently in Roosevelt's campaign, but he was disappointed with a peripheral speaking tour limited to four Midwestern states.

During the critical first 100 days of Roosevelt's presidency in spring 1933, Long was generally a strong supporter of the New Deal, but differed with the president on patronage. Roosevelt wanted control of the patronage, and Long wanted to control it for his state. The two men publicly split in late 1933. Long mocked Roosevelt's patrician background, calling him "Prince Franklin, Knight of the Nourmahal", a reference to the yacht of Roosevelt's billionaire friend Vincent Astor. Aware that Roosevelt had no intention to radically redistribute the country's wealth, Long became one of the few national politicians to oppose Roosevelt's New Deal policies from the left. (Note: The other most notable leftist critic was Catholic preacher and radio-host Father Coughlin.) He considered them inadequate in the face of the escalating economic crisis. Long still sometimes supported Roosevelt's programs in the Senate, explaining: "Whenever this administration has gone to the left I have voted with it, and whenever it has gone to the right I have voted against it."

Roosevelt considered Long a radical demagogue. The president told economic advisor Rexford Tugwell that Long, along with General Douglas MacArthur, was "one of the two most dangerous men in America". In June 1933, Long visited the White House to meet President Roosevelt, but the meeting was a disaster: Long was flagrantly disrespectful, refusing to take off his straw hat and addressing Roosevelt as "Frank", instead of the normal "Mr. President".

Shortly thereafter, in June 1933, in an effort to undermine Long's political dominance, Roosevelt cut him out of consultation on the distribution of federal funds or patronage in Louisiana and placed Long's opponents in charge of federal programs in the state. Roosevelt supported a Senate inquiry into the election of Long ally John H. Overton to the Senate in 1932. The Long machine was accused of election fraud and voter intimidation, but the inquiry came up empty, and Overton was seated. To discredit Long and damage his support base, Roosevelt had Long's finances investigated by the Internal Revenue Service in 1934. Although they failed to link Long to any illegality, some of his lieutenants were charged with income tax evasion. Only one had been convicted by the time of Long's death. Roosevelt's son would later note that in this instance, his father "may have been the originator of the concept of employing the IRS as a weapon of political retribution".

== Foreign policy ==
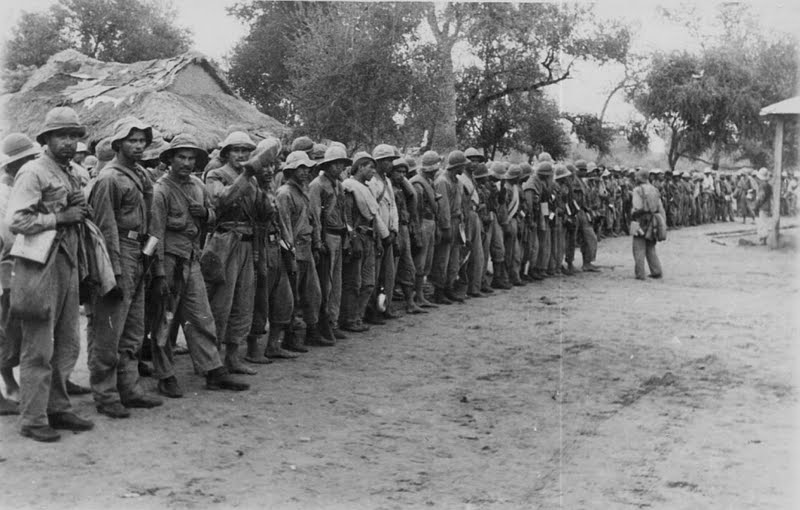
Paraguayan troops during the Chaco War. Long strongly supported Paraguay during the conflict.

On May 30, 1934, Long took to the Senate floor to debate the abrogation of the Platt amendment. But instead of debating the amendment, Long declared his stance on the Chaco War. He proclaimed support for Paraguay against Bolivia, as he maintained that US President Rutherford B. Hayes had awarded the Chaco region to Paraguay in 1878. Long blamed the entire war on "the forces of imperialistic finance", claiming that Paraguay was the rightful owner of the Chaco. He said that Standard Oil, whom Long called "promoter of revolutions in Central America, South America and Mexico", had "bought" the Bolivian government and started the war because Paraguay was unwilling to grant them oil concessions. Long ended his speech by claiming the entire Chaco War was due to the machinations of Wall Street, called the American arms embargo to both sides as subservience to the "big papa" of Wall Street and stated: "Well should we begin on Memorial Day, the hour of mourning, to understand that the imperialistic principles of the Standard Oil Company have become mightier than the solemn treaties and pronouncements of the United States government".

Long's speech made him a national hero in Paraguay while leading to protests from the Bolivian legation in Washington. Long's thesis that the U.S. policy toward Latin America was dictated solely by the selfish concerns of oil companies, and that the U.S. was maintaining a pro-Bolivian neutrality only because that is what Standard Oil wanted, attracted much attention in Latin American newspapers. The State Department was greatly concerned about the damage Long was inflicting on the reputation of the U.S. Throughout the summer of 1934, American diplomats waged a sustained public relations campaign against Long throughout Latin America.

In a second speech given on June 7, 1934, in response to the Bolivian protests, Long again supported Paraguay and attacked Standard Oil as "foreign murderers" and "imperialist oppressors of the freedom of the South American people". Besides abusing Standard Oil, Long announced that since Bolivia was taking the Chaco dispute to the World Court, he was opposed to the United States joining the World Court, saying:

"Bolivia has run over to the famous World Court and the League of Nations. So here is the Standard Oil Company of the United States sailing under the title of Bolivia, putting one of their emissaries on a boat, and skyrocketing him to Geneva to renounce the Hayes award of the United States".

After capturing a Bolivian fort in July 1934, the Paraguayans renamed it Fort Long. Thanks to Long's outspoken stance on the war, he had established himself as one of the most ardent isolationists in the Senate. He further argued that the United States involvement in the Spanish–American War and the First World War had been deadly mistakes conducted on behalf of Wall Street. Consequently, Long demanded the immediate independence of the Philippines, which had been occupied by the United States since 1899. He also opposed American entry into the World Court.

== Proposed legislation ==
=== Long plan ===
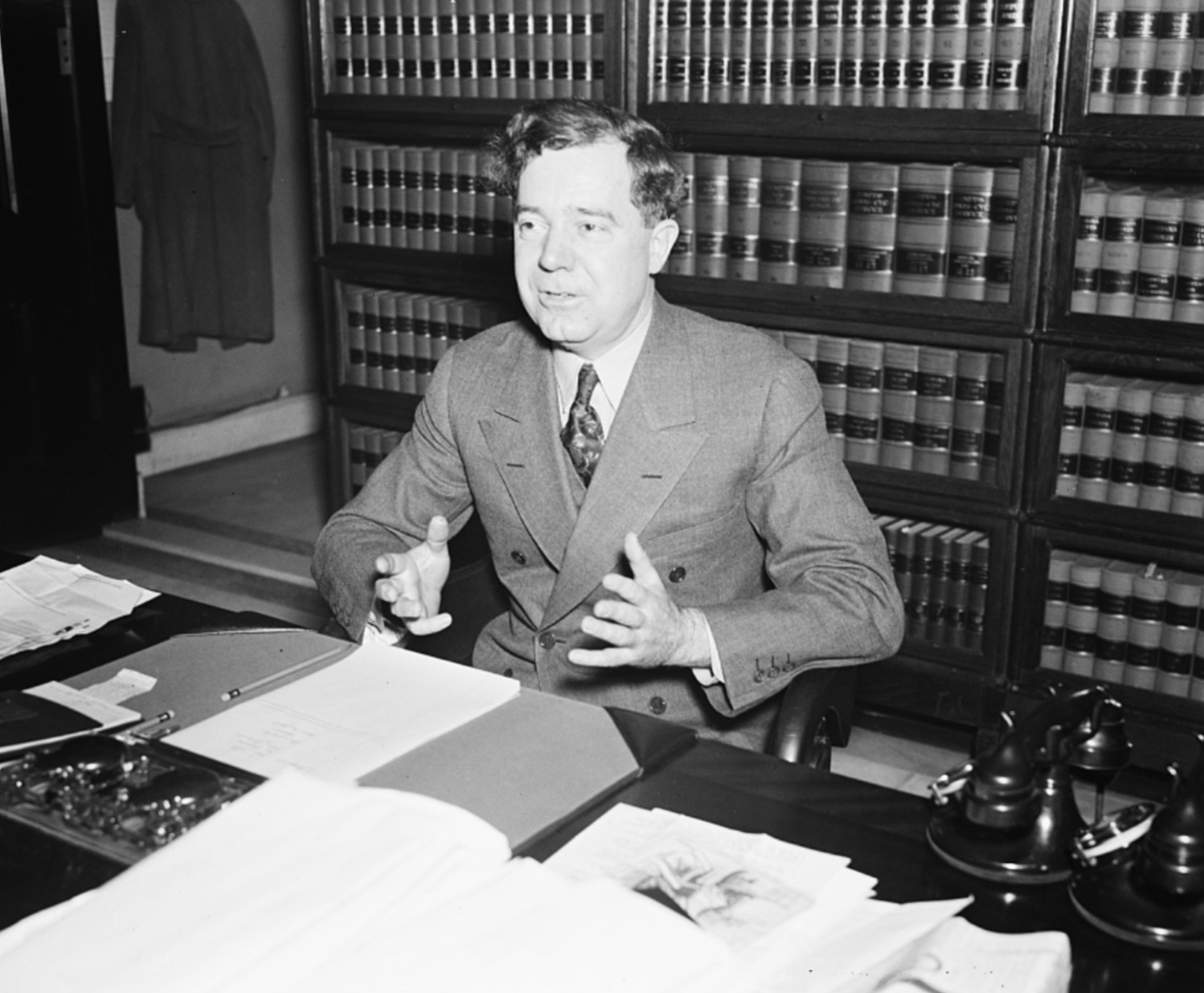
Long speaking from behind his desk at the Capitol, 1935

In March 1933, Long offered a series of bills collectively known as "the Long plan" for the redistribution of wealth. The first bill proposed a new progressive tax code designed to cap personal fortunes at $100 million. Fortunes above $1 million would be taxed at 1 percent; fortunes above $2 million would be taxed at 2 percent, and so forth, up to a 100 percent tax on fortunes greater than $100 million. The second bill would limit annual income to $1 million, and the third bill would cap individual inheritances at $5 million.

External videos
- Long's "Share the Wealth" speech on YouTube

=== Share Our Wealth ===
In February 1934, Long introduced his Share Our Wealth plan over a nationwide radio broadcast. He proposed capping personal fortunes at $50 million and repeated his call to limit annual income to $1 million and inheritances to $5 million. (He also suggested reducing the cap on personal fortunes to $10 million–$15 million per individual, if necessary, and later lowered the cap to $5 million–$8 million in printed materials.) The resulting funds would be used to guarantee every family a basic household grant, or "household estate" as Long called it, of $5,000 and a minimum annual income of $2,000–3,000, or one-third of the average family homestead value and income. Long supplemented his plan with proposals for free college education, with admission based on an IQ test, and vocational training for all able students, veterans' benefits, federal assistance to farmers, public works projects, greater federal regulation of economic activity, a $30 monthly pension for those over the age of 65, a month's vacation for every worker, World War I veteran's adjusted Compensation certificates due in 1945 would be issued immediately, and limiting the work week to thirty hours to boost employment. He proposed a $10 billion land reclamation project to end the Dust Bowl. Long promised free medical service and what he called a "war on disease" led by the Mayo brothers. These reforms, Long claimed, would end the Great Depression.

Long's plans for the "Share Our Wealth" program attracted much criticism from economists at the time, who stated that Long's plans for redistributing wealth would not result in every American family receiving a grant of $5,000 per year, but rather $400/per year, and that his plans for confiscatory taxation would cap the average annual income at about $3,000. They noted that the confiscated fortunes would only yield $1.50 per each poor family. In 1934, Long held a public debate with Norman Thomas, the leader of the Socialist Party of America, on the merits of Share Our Wealth versus socialism.

Some issues of American Progress reached a circulation of over 1.5 million.

With the Senate unwilling to support his proposals, in February 1934 Long formed a national political organization, the Share Our Wealth Society. A network of local clubs led by national organizer Reverend Gerald L. K. Smith, the Share Our Wealth Society was intended to operate outside of and in opposition to the Democratic Party and the Roosevelt administration. By 1935, the society had over 7.5 million members in 27,000 clubs across the country. Long's Senate office received an average of 60,000 letters a week, resulting in Long hiring 48 stenographers to type responses. Of the two trucks that delivered mail to the Senate, one was devoted solely to mail for Long. Long's newspaper, now renamed American Progress, averaged a circulation of 300,000, with some issues reaching over 1.5 million. Long's radical programs were very attractive to union-members; Teamsters president Daniel J. Tobin expressed his growing concerns to Roosevelt. Long drew international attention: writer H. G. Wells traveled across the Atlantic just to interview Long. Wells noted that Long was "like a Winston Churchill who has never been at Harrow. He abounds in promises."

Some historians believe that pressure from Long and his organization contributed to Roosevelt's "turn to the left" in the Second New Deal (1935), which consisted of the Social Security Act, the Works Progress Administration, the National Labor Relations Board, Aid to Dependent Children, and the Wealth Tax Act of 1935. Each tenet of the Second New Deal seemed to foil one of Long's corresponding proposals. For example, Roosevelt's National Youth Administration provided part-time employment to the country's youth, counteracting the appeal for Long's free college proposal. Roosevelt reportedly admitted in private to trying to "steal Long's thunder".

== See also ==
- Political views of Huey Long

Party political offices
Preceded by Henry L. Fuqua	Democratic nominee for Governor of Louisiana; 1928	Succeeded by Oscar K. Allen
Preceded by Joseph E. Ransdell	Democratic nominee for U.S. Senator from Louisiana (Class 2); 1930	Succeeded by Oscar K. Allen
Political offices
Preceded by Oramel H. Simpson	Governor of Louisiana; 1928–1932	Succeeded by Alvin Olin King
U.S. Senate
Preceded by Joseph E. Ransdell	United States Senator (Class 2) from Louisiana; 1932–1935; Served alongside: Edwin S. Broussard, John Overton	Succeeded by Rose McConnell Long
