= Pourciau =

French Creole surname

Pourciau is a Louisiana Creole surname. Notable people with the name include:

- Kenneth J. "Boo" Pourciau, American drummer and singer for the band LeRoux
- Kerry Pourciau, American civil servant
