= List of United States senators from Louisiana =

Current delegation

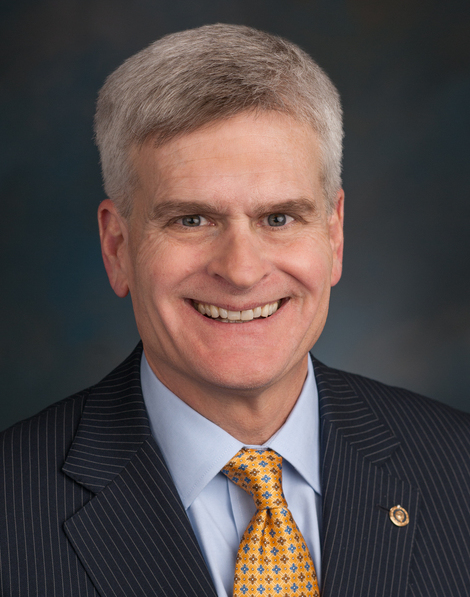
Bill Cassidy (R)

John Kennedy (R)

(ordered by seniority)

Louisiana was admitted to the Union on April 30, 1812, and elects senators to class 2 and class 3. Russell Long was the state's longest-serving senator, serving from 1948–1987. Its current senators are Republicans Bill Cassidy and John Kennedy.

== List of senators ==
Class 2 Class 2 senators belong to the electoral cycle that most recently had regular elections in 2008, 2014, 2020, and 2026. The next election will be in 2032.						C	Class 3 Class 3 senators belong to the electoral cycle that most recently had regular elections in 2004, 2010, 2016, and 2022. The next election will be in 2028.					
#	Senator	Party	Dates in office	Electoral history	T	C	T	Electoral history	Dates in office	Party	Senator	#
Vacant			Apr 30, 1812 – Sep 3, 1812	Louisiana did not elect its senators until four months after statehood.	1	12th	1	Louisiana did not elect its senators until four months after statehood.	Apr 30, 1812 – Sep 3, 1812	Vacant		
1	Jean Noël Destréhan (Destrehan)	Democratic- Republican	Sep 3, 1812 – Oct 1, 1812	Resigned	1	12th	1	Elected in 1812.	Sep 3, 1812 – Mar 3, 1813	Democratic- Republican	Allan B. Magruder (Opelousas)	1
Vacant			Oct 1, 1812 – Oct 8, 1812		1	12th	1	Elected in 1812.	Sep 3, 1812 – Mar 3, 1813	Democratic- Republican	Allan B. Magruder (Opelousas)	1
2	Thomas Posey (Attakapas)	Democratic- Republican	Oct 8, 1812 – Feb 4, 1813	Appointed to continue Destréhan's term. Lost election to finish Destréhan's term.	1	12th	1	Elected in 1812.	Sep 3, 1812 – Mar 3, 1813	Democratic- Republican	Allan B. Magruder (Opelousas)	1
3	James Brown (New Orleans)	Democratic- Republican	Feb 5, 1813 – Mar 3, 1817	Elected to finish Destréhan's term. Lost election to full term.	1	12th	1	Elected in 1812.	Sep 3, 1812 – Mar 3, 1813	Democratic- Republican	Allan B. Magruder (Opelousas)	1
3	James Brown (New Orleans)	Democratic- Republican	Feb 5, 1813 – Mar 3, 1817	Elected to finish Destréhan's term. Lost election to full term.	1	13th	2	Elected in 1813; Retired.	Mar 4, 1813 – Mar 3, 1819	Democratic- Republican	Eligius Fromentin (New Orleans)	2
3	James Brown (New Orleans)	Democratic- Republican	Feb 5, 1813 – Mar 3, 1817	Elected to finish Destréhan's term. Lost election to full term.	1	14th	2	Elected in 1813; Retired.	Mar 4, 1813 – Mar 3, 1819	Democratic- Republican	Eligius Fromentin (New Orleans)	2
4	William C. C. Claiborne (New Orleans)	Democratic- Republican	Mar 4, 1817 – Nov 23, 1817	Elected in 1817. Died.	2	15th	2	Elected in 1813; Retired.	Mar 4, 1813 – Mar 3, 1819	Democratic- Republican	Eligius Fromentin (New Orleans)	2
Vacant			Nov 23, 1817 – Jan 12, 1818		2	15th	2	Elected in 1813; Retired.	Mar 4, 1813 – Mar 3, 1819	Democratic- Republican	Eligius Fromentin (New Orleans)	2
5	Henry Johnson (Donaldsonville)	Democratic- Republican	Jan 12, 1818 – May 27, 1824	Elected to finish Claiborne's term.	2	15th	2	Elected in 1813; Retired.	Mar 4, 1813 – Mar 3, 1819	Democratic- Republican	Eligius Fromentin (New Orleans)	2
5	Henry Johnson (Donaldsonville)	Democratic- Republican	Jan 12, 1818 – May 27, 1824	Elected to finish Claiborne's term.	2	16th	3	Elected in 1819. Resigned to become U.S. Minister to France.	Mar 4, 1819 – Dec 10, 1823	Democratic- Republican	James Brown (New Orleans)	3
5	Henry Johnson (Donaldsonville)	Democratic- Republican	Jan 12, 1818 – May 27, 1824	Elected to finish Claiborne's term.	2	17th	3	Elected in 1819. Resigned to become U.S. Minister to France.	Mar 4, 1819 – Dec 10, 1823	Democratic- Republican	James Brown (New Orleans)	3
5	Henry Johnson (Donaldsonville)	Democratic- Republican	Jan 12, 1818 – May 27, 1824	Elected to full term in 1823. Resigned to become Governor of Louisiana.	3	18th	3	Elected in 1819. Resigned to become U.S. Minister to France.	Mar 4, 1819 – Dec 10, 1823	Democratic- Republican	James Brown (New Orleans)	3
5	Henry Johnson (Donaldsonville)	Democratic- Republican	Jan 12, 1818 – May 27, 1824	Elected to full term in 1823. Resigned to become Governor of Louisiana.	3	18th	3		Dec 10, 1823 – Jan 15, 1824	Vacant		
5	Henry Johnson (Donaldsonville)	Democratic- Republican	Jan 12, 1818 – May 27, 1824	Elected to full term in 1823. Resigned to become Governor of Louisiana.	3	18th	3	Elected to finish Brown's term.	Jan 15, 1824 – May 19, 1833	Democratic- Republican	Josiah S. Johnston (Alexandria)	4
Vacant			May 27, 1824 – Nov 19, 1824		3	18th	3	Elected to finish Brown's term.	Jan 15, 1824 – May 19, 1833	Democratic- Republican	Josiah S. Johnston (Alexandria)	4
6	Dominique Bouligny (New Orleans)	Democratic- Republican	Nov 19, 1824 – Mar 3, 1829	Elected to finish Johnson's term.	3	18th	3	Elected to finish Brown's term.	Jan 15, 1824 – May 19, 1833	Democratic- Republican	Josiah S. Johnston (Alexandria)	4
6	Dominique Bouligny (New Orleans)	National; Republican	Nov 19, 1824 – Mar 3, 1829	Elected to finish Johnson's term.	3	19th	4	Elected to full term in 1825.	Jan 15, 1824 – May 19, 1833	National; Republican	Josiah S. Johnston (Alexandria)	4
6	Dominique Bouligny (New Orleans)	National; Republican	Nov 19, 1824 – Mar 3, 1829	Elected to finish Johnson's term.	3	20th	4	Elected to full term in 1825.	Jan 15, 1824 – May 19, 1833	National; Republican	Josiah S. Johnston (Alexandria)	4
7	Edward Livingston (New Orleans)	Jacksonian	Mar 4, 1829 – May 24, 1831	Elected in 1829. Resigned to become U.S. Secretary of State.	4	21st	4	Elected to full term in 1825.	Jan 15, 1824 – May 19, 1833	National; Republican	Josiah S. Johnston (Alexandria)	4
7	Edward Livingston (New Orleans)	Jacksonian	Mar 4, 1829 – May 24, 1831	Elected in 1829. Resigned to become U.S. Secretary of State.	4	22nd	5	Re-elected in 1831. Died.	Jan 15, 1824 – May 19, 1833	National; Republican	Josiah S. Johnston (Alexandria)	4
Vacant			May 24, 1831 – Nov 15, 1831		4	22nd	5	Re-elected in 1831. Died.	Jan 15, 1824 – May 19, 1833	National; Republican	Josiah S. Johnston (Alexandria)	4
8	George A. Waggaman (New Orleans)	National; Republican	Nov 15, 1831 – Mar 3, 1835	Elected to finish Livingston's term.	4	22nd	5	Re-elected in 1831. Died.	Jan 15, 1824 – May 19, 1833	National; Republican	Josiah S. Johnston (Alexandria)	4
8	George A. Waggaman (New Orleans)	National; Republican	Nov 15, 1831 – Mar 3, 1835	Elected to finish Livingston's term.	4	23rd	5	Re-elected in 1831. Died.	Jan 15, 1824 – May 19, 1833	National; Republican	Josiah S. Johnston (Alexandria)	4
8	George A. Waggaman (New Orleans)	National; Republican	Nov 15, 1831 – Mar 3, 1835	Elected to finish Livingston's term.	4	23rd	5		May 19, 1833 – Dec 19, 1833	Vacant		
8	George A. Waggaman (New Orleans)	National; Republican	Nov 15, 1831 – Mar 3, 1835	Elected to finish Livingston's term.	4	23rd	5	Elected to finish Johnston's term. Resigned due to ill health.	Dec 19, 1833 – Jan 5, 1837	National; Republican	Alexander Porter (Attakapas)	5
Vacant			Mar 4, 1835 – Jan 13, 1836	Charles Gayarré (J) was elected in 1835, but resigned due to ill health.	5	24th	5	Elected to finish Johnston's term. Resigned due to ill health.	Dec 19, 1833 – Jan 5, 1837	National; Republican	Alexander Porter (Attakapas)	5
9	Robert C. Nicholas (Donaldsonville)	Jacksonian	Jan 13, 1836 – Mar 3, 1841	Elected to finish Gauarré's term. [data missing]	5	24th	5	Elected to finish Johnston's term. Resigned due to ill health.	Dec 19, 1833 – Jan 5, 1837	National; Republican	Alexander Porter (Attakapas)	5
9	Robert C. Nicholas (Donaldsonville)	Jacksonian	Jan 13, 1836 – Mar 3, 1841	Elected to finish Gauarré's term. [data missing]	5	24th	5		Jan 5, 1837 – Jan 12, 1837	Vacant		
9	Robert C. Nicholas (Donaldsonville)	Jacksonian	Jan 13, 1836 – Mar 3, 1841	Elected to finish Gauarré's term. [data missing]	5	24th	5	Elected to finish Porter's term.	Jan 12, 1837 – Mar 1, 1842	Jacksonian	Alexandre Mouton (Vermilionville)	6
9	Robert C. Nicholas (Donaldsonville)	Democratic	Jan 13, 1836 – Mar 3, 1841	Elected to finish Gauarré's term. [data missing]	5	25th	6	Re-elected in 1837. Resigned.	Jan 12, 1837 – Mar 1, 1842	Democratic	Alexandre Mouton (Vermilionville)	6
9	Robert C. Nicholas (Donaldsonville)	Democratic	Jan 13, 1836 – Mar 3, 1841	Elected to finish Gauarré's term. [data missing]	5	26th	6	Re-elected in 1837. Resigned.	Jan 12, 1837 – Mar 1, 1842	Democratic	Alexandre Mouton (Vermilionville)	6
10	Alexander Barrow (Baton Rouge)	Whig	Mar 4, 1841 – Dec 29, 1846	Elected in 1840. Died.	6	27th	6	Re-elected in 1837. Resigned.	Jan 12, 1837 – Mar 1, 1842	Democratic	Alexandre Mouton (Vermilionville)	6
10	Alexander Barrow (Baton Rouge)	Whig	Mar 4, 1841 – Dec 29, 1846	Elected in 1840. Died.	6	27th	6		Mar 1, 1842 – Apr 14, 1842	Vacant		
10	Alexander Barrow (Baton Rouge)	Whig	Mar 4, 1841 – Dec 29, 1846	Elected in 1840. Died.	6	27th	6	Appointed to finish Mouton's term. Lost election to full term.	Apr 14, 1842 – Mar 3, 1843	Whig	Charles Conrad (New Orleans)	7
10	Alexander Barrow (Baton Rouge)	Whig	Mar 4, 1841 – Dec 29, 1846	Elected in 1840. Died.	6	28th	7	Elected in 1843, but due to ill health did not take his seat. Died.	Mar 4, 1843 – Jan 13, 1844	Whig	Alexander Porter (Attakapas)	8
10	Alexander Barrow (Baton Rouge)	Whig	Mar 4, 1841 – Dec 29, 1846	Elected in 1840. Died.	6	28th	7		Jan 13, 1844 – Feb 12, 1844	Vacant		
10	Alexander Barrow (Baton Rouge)	Whig	Mar 4, 1841 – Dec 29, 1846	Elected in 1840. Died.	6	28th	7	Elected to finish Porter's term Lost election to full term in 1849.	Feb 12, 1844 – Mar 3, 1849	Whig	Henry Johnson (Donaldsonville)	9
10	Alexander Barrow (Baton Rouge)	Whig	Mar 4, 1841 – Dec 29, 1846	Elected in 1840. Died.	6	29th	7	Elected to finish Porter's term Lost election to full term in 1849.	Feb 12, 1844 – Mar 3, 1849	Whig	Henry Johnson (Donaldsonville)	9
Vacant			Dec 29, 1846 – Jan 21, 1847		6	29th	7	Elected to finish Porter's term Lost election to full term in 1849.	Feb 12, 1844 – Mar 3, 1849	Whig	Henry Johnson (Donaldsonville)	9
11	Pierre Soulé (New Orleans)	Democratic	Jan 21, 1847 – Mar 3, 1847	Elected to finish Barrow's term. [data missing]	6	29th	7	Elected to finish Porter's term Lost election to full term in 1849.	Feb 12, 1844 – Mar 3, 1849	Whig	Henry Johnson (Donaldsonville)	9
12	Solomon W. Downs (Monroe)	Democratic	Mar 4, 1847 – Mar 3, 1853	Elected in 1847. Lost re-election.	7	30th	7	Elected to finish Porter's term Lost election to full term in 1849.	Feb 12, 1844 – Mar 3, 1849	Whig	Henry Johnson (Donaldsonville)	9
12	Solomon W. Downs (Monroe)	Democratic	Mar 4, 1847 – Mar 3, 1853	Elected in 1847. Lost re-election.	7	31st	8	Elected in 1848. Resigned to become U.S. Minister to Spain.	Mar 3, 1849 – Apr 11, 1853	Democratic	Pierre Soulé (New Orleans)	10
12	Solomon W. Downs (Monroe)	Democratic	Mar 4, 1847 – Mar 3, 1853	Elected in 1847. Lost re-election.	7	32nd	8	Elected in 1848. Resigned to become U.S. Minister to Spain.	Mar 3, 1849 – Apr 11, 1853	Democratic	Pierre Soulé (New Orleans)	10
13	Judah P. Benjamin (New Orleans)	Whig	Mar 4, 1853 – Feb 4, 1861	Elected in 1852.	8	33rd	8	Elected in 1848. Resigned to become U.S. Minister to Spain.	Mar 3, 1849 – Apr 11, 1853	Democratic	Pierre Soulé (New Orleans)	10
13	Judah P. Benjamin (New Orleans)	Whig	Mar 4, 1853 – Feb 4, 1861	Elected in 1852.	8	33rd	8		Apr 11, 1853 – Dec 5, 1853	Vacant		
13	Judah P. Benjamin (New Orleans)	Whig	Mar 4, 1853 – Feb 4, 1861	Elected in 1852.	8	33rd	8	Elected to finish Soulé's term.	Dec 5, 1853 – Feb 4, 1861	Democratic	John Slidell (New Orleans)	11
13	Judah P. Benjamin (New Orleans)	Whig	Mar 4, 1853 – Feb 4, 1861	Elected in 1852.	8	34th	9	Re-election year unknown. Resigned.	Dec 5, 1853 – Feb 4, 1861	Democratic	John Slidell (New Orleans)	11
13	Judah P. Benjamin (New Orleans)	Democratic	Mar 4, 1853 – Feb 4, 1861	Elected in 1852.	8	35th	9	Re-election year unknown. Resigned.	Dec 5, 1853 – Feb 4, 1861	Democratic	John Slidell (New Orleans)	11
13	Judah P. Benjamin (New Orleans)	Democratic	Mar 4, 1853 – Feb 4, 1861	Re-elected in 1859. Withdrew.	9	36th	9	Re-election year unknown. Resigned.	Dec 5, 1853 – Feb 4, 1861	Democratic	John Slidell (New Orleans)	11
Vacant			Feb 4, 1861 – Jul 8, 1868	Civil War and Reconstruction	9	36th	9	Civil War and Reconstruction	Feb 4, 1861 – Jul 9, 1868	Vacant		
Vacant			Feb 4, 1861 – Jul 8, 1868	Civil War and Reconstruction	9	37th	10	Civil War and Reconstruction	Feb 4, 1861 – Jul 9, 1868	Vacant		
Vacant			Feb 4, 1861 – Jul 8, 1868	Civil War and Reconstruction	9	38th	10	Civil War and Reconstruction	Feb 4, 1861 – Jul 9, 1868	Vacant		
Vacant			Feb 4, 1861 – Jul 8, 1868	Civil War and Reconstruction	10	39th	10	Civil War and Reconstruction	Feb 4, 1861 – Jul 9, 1868	Vacant		
Vacant			Feb 4, 1861 – Jul 8, 1868	Civil War and Reconstruction	10	40th	11	Civil War and Reconstruction	Feb 4, 1861 – Jul 9, 1868	Vacant		
14	John S. Harris (Vidalia)	Republican	Jul 8, 1868 – Mar 3, 1871	Elected to finish incomplete term in 1868. [data missing].	10	40th	11	Civil War and Reconstruction	Feb 4, 1861 – Jul 9, 1868	Vacant		
14	John S. Harris (Vidalia)	Republican	Jul 8, 1868 – Mar 3, 1871	Elected to finish incomplete term in 1868. [data missing].	10	40th	11	Elected to finish incomplete term. Resigned to become Governor of Louisiana.	Jul 9, 1868 – Nov 1, 1872	Republican	William Pitt Kellogg (New Orleans)	12
14	John S. Harris (Vidalia)	Republican	Jul 8, 1868 – Mar 3, 1871	Elected to finish incomplete term in 1868. [data missing].	10	41st	11	Elected to finish incomplete term. Resigned to become Governor of Louisiana.	Jul 9, 1868 – Nov 1, 1872	Republican	William Pitt Kellogg (New Orleans)	12
15	J. R. West (New Orleans)	Republican	Mar 4, 1871 – Mar 3, 1877	Election year unknown. Retired.	11	42nd	11	Elected to finish incomplete term. Resigned to become Governor of Louisiana.	Jul 9, 1868 – Nov 1, 1872	Republican	William Pitt Kellogg (New Orleans)	12
15	J. R. West (New Orleans)	Republican	Mar 4, 1871 – Mar 3, 1877	Election year unknown. Retired.	11	42nd	11	Senate declined to seat rival claimants William L. McMillen and P. B. S. Pinchback	Nov 1, 1872 – Jan 12, 1876	Vacant		
15	J. R. West (New Orleans)	Republican	Mar 4, 1871 – Mar 3, 1877	Election year unknown. Retired.	11	43rd	12	Senate declined to seat rival claimants William L. McMillen and P. B. S. Pinchback	Nov 1, 1872 – Jan 12, 1876	Vacant		
15	J. R. West (New Orleans)	Republican	Mar 4, 1871 – Mar 3, 1877	Election year unknown. Retired.	11	44th	12	Senate declined to seat rival claimants William L. McMillen and P. B. S. Pinchback	Nov 1, 1872 – Jan 12, 1876	Vacant		
15	J. R. West (New Orleans)	Republican	Mar 4, 1871 – Mar 3, 1877	Election year unknown. Retired.	11	44th	12	Elected to finish incomplete term in 1876. Lost re-election.	Jan 12, 1876 – Mar 3, 1879	Democratic	James B. Eustis (New Orleans)	13
16	William Pitt Kellogg (New Orleans)	Republican	Mar 4, 1877 – Mar 3, 1883	Elected in 1876. Retired to run for U.S. House.	12	45th	12	Elected to finish incomplete term in 1876. Lost re-election.	Jan 12, 1876 – Mar 3, 1879	Democratic	James B. Eustis (New Orleans)	13
16	William Pitt Kellogg (New Orleans)	Republican	Mar 4, 1877 – Mar 3, 1883	Elected in 1876. Retired to run for U.S. House.	12	46th	13	Elected in 1879. Lost re-election.	Mar 4, 1879 – Mar 3, 1885	Democratic	Benjamin F. Jonas (New Orleans)	14
16	William Pitt Kellogg (New Orleans)	Republican	Mar 4, 1877 – Mar 3, 1883	Elected in 1876. Retired to run for U.S. House.	12	47th	13	Elected in 1879. Lost re-election.	Mar 4, 1879 – Mar 3, 1885	Democratic	Benjamin F. Jonas (New Orleans)	14
17	Randall L. Gibson (New Orleans)	Democratic	Mar 4, 1883 – Dec 15, 1892	Elected in 1882.	13	48th	13	Elected in 1879. Lost re-election.	Mar 4, 1879 – Mar 3, 1885	Democratic	Benjamin F. Jonas (New Orleans)	14
17	Randall L. Gibson (New Orleans)	Democratic	Mar 4, 1883 – Dec 15, 1892	Elected in 1882.	13	49th	14	Election year unknown. Retired.	Mar 4, 1885 – Mar 3, 1891	Democratic	James B. Eustis (New Orleans)	15
17	Randall L. Gibson (New Orleans)	Democratic	Mar 4, 1883 – Dec 15, 1892	Elected in 1882.	13	50th	14	Election year unknown. Retired.	Mar 4, 1885 – Mar 3, 1891	Democratic	James B. Eustis (New Orleans)	15
17	Randall L. Gibson (New Orleans)	Democratic	Mar 4, 1883 – Dec 15, 1892	Re-elected in 1889. Died.	14	51st	14	Election year unknown. Retired.	Mar 4, 1885 – Mar 3, 1891	Democratic	James B. Eustis (New Orleans)	15
17	Randall L. Gibson (New Orleans)	Democratic	Mar 4, 1883 – Dec 15, 1892	Re-elected in 1889. Died.	14	52nd	15	Elected in 1891. Resigned to become U.S. Supreme Court Justice.	Mar 4, 1891 – Mar 12, 1894	Democratic	Edward Douglass White (New Orleans)	16
Vacant			Dec 15, 1892 – Dec 31, 1892		14	52nd	15	Elected in 1891. Resigned to become U.S. Supreme Court Justice.	Mar 4, 1891 – Mar 12, 1894	Democratic	Edward Douglass White (New Orleans)	16
18	Donelson Caffery (Franklin)	Democratic	Dec 31, 1892 – Mar 3, 1901	Appointed to continue Gibson's term. Elected in 1894 to finish Gibson's term.	14	52nd	15	Elected in 1891. Resigned to become U.S. Supreme Court Justice.	Mar 4, 1891 – Mar 12, 1894	Democratic	Edward Douglass White (New Orleans)	16
18	Donelson Caffery (Franklin)	Democratic	Dec 31, 1892 – Mar 3, 1901	Appointed to continue Gibson's term. Elected in 1894 to finish Gibson's term.	14	53rd	15	Elected in 1891. Resigned to become U.S. Supreme Court Justice.	Mar 4, 1891 – Mar 12, 1894	Democratic	Edward Douglass White (New Orleans)	16
18	Donelson Caffery (Franklin)	Democratic	Dec 31, 1892 – Mar 3, 1901	Appointed to continue Gibson's term. Elected in 1894 to finish Gibson's term.	14	53rd	15	Appointed to continue White's term. Elected in 1894 to finish White's term. Retired.	Mar 12, 1894 – Mar 3, 1897	Democratic	Newton C. Blanchard (Shreveport)	17
18	Donelson Caffery (Franklin)	Democratic	Dec 31, 1892 – Mar 3, 1901	Elected in 1894 to the next term, before election to finish Gibson's term. Retired.	15	54th	15	Appointed to continue White's term. Elected in 1894 to finish White's term. Retired.	Mar 12, 1894 – Mar 3, 1897	Democratic	Newton C. Blanchard (Shreveport)	17
18	Donelson Caffery (Franklin)	Democratic	Dec 31, 1892 – Mar 3, 1901	Elected in 1894 to the next term, before election to finish Gibson's term. Retired.	15	55th	16	Elected in 1896.	Mar 4, 1897 – Jun 28, 1910	Democratic	Samuel D. McEnery (New Orleans)	18
18	Donelson Caffery (Franklin)	Democratic	Dec 31, 1892 – Mar 3, 1901	Elected in 1894 to the next term, before election to finish Gibson's term. Retired.	15	56th	16	Elected in 1896.	Mar 4, 1897 – Jun 28, 1910	Democratic	Samuel D. McEnery (New Orleans)	18
19	Murphy J. Foster (Franklin)	Democratic	Mar 4, 1901 – Mar 3, 1913	Elected in 1900.	16	57th	16	Elected in 1896.	Mar 4, 1897 – Jun 28, 1910	Democratic	Samuel D. McEnery (New Orleans)	18
19	Murphy J. Foster (Franklin)	Democratic	Mar 4, 1901 – Mar 3, 1913	Elected in 1900.	16	58th	17	Re-elected early in 1900.	Mar 4, 1897 – Jun 28, 1910	Democratic	Samuel D. McEnery (New Orleans)	18
19	Murphy J. Foster (Franklin)	Democratic	Mar 4, 1901 – Mar 3, 1913	Elected in 1900.	16	59th	17	Re-elected early in 1900.	Mar 4, 1897 – Jun 28, 1910	Democratic	Samuel D. McEnery (New Orleans)	18
19	Murphy J. Foster (Franklin)	Democratic	Mar 4, 1901 – Mar 3, 1913	Re-elected early in 1904. Lost renomination.	17	60th	17	Re-elected early in 1900.	Mar 4, 1897 – Jun 28, 1910	Democratic	Samuel D. McEnery (New Orleans)	18
19	Murphy J. Foster (Franklin)	Democratic	Mar 4, 1901 – Mar 3, 1913	Re-elected early in 1904. Lost renomination.	17	61st	18	Re-elected in 1908. Died.	Mar 4, 1897 – Jun 28, 1910	Democratic	Samuel D. McEnery (New Orleans)	18
19	Murphy J. Foster (Franklin)	Democratic	Mar 4, 1901 – Mar 3, 1913	Re-elected early in 1904. Lost renomination.	17	61st	18		Jun 28, 1910 – Dec 7, 1910	Vacant		
19	Murphy J. Foster (Franklin)	Democratic	Mar 4, 1901 – Mar 3, 1913	Re-elected early in 1904. Lost renomination.	17	61st	18	Elected to finish McEnery's term. Retired.	Dec 7, 1910 – Mar 3, 1915	Democratic	John Thornton (Alexandria)	19
19	Murphy J. Foster (Franklin)	Democratic	Mar 4, 1901 – Mar 3, 1913	Re-elected early in 1904. Lost renomination.	17	62nd	18	Elected to finish McEnery's term. Retired.	Dec 7, 1910 – Mar 3, 1915	Democratic	John Thornton (Alexandria)	19
20	Joseph E. Ransdell (Lake Providence)	Democratic	Mar 4, 1913 – Mar 3, 1931	Elected in 1912.	18	63rd	18	Elected to finish McEnery's term. Retired.	Dec 7, 1910 – Mar 3, 1915	Democratic	John Thornton (Alexandria)	19
20	Joseph E. Ransdell (Lake Providence)	Democratic	Mar 4, 1913 – Mar 3, 1931	Elected in 1912.	18	64th	19	Elected early in 1912. Died.	Mar 4, 1915 – Apr 12, 1918	Democratic	Robert F. Broussard (New Iberia)	20
20	Joseph E. Ransdell (Lake Providence)	Democratic	Mar 4, 1913 – Mar 3, 1931	Elected in 1912.	18	65th	19	Elected early in 1912. Died.	Mar 4, 1915 – Apr 12, 1918	Democratic	Robert F. Broussard (New Iberia)	20
20	Joseph E. Ransdell (Lake Providence)	Democratic	Mar 4, 1913 – Mar 3, 1931	Elected in 1912.	18	65th	19		Apr 12, 1918 – Apr 22, 1918	Vacant		
20	Joseph E. Ransdell (Lake Providence)	Democratic	Mar 4, 1913 – Mar 3, 1931	Elected in 1912.	18	65th	19	Appointed to continue Broussard's term. Retired when elected successor qualified.	Apr 22, 1918 – Nov 5, 1918	Democratic	Walter Guion (Napoleonville)	21
20	Joseph E. Ransdell (Lake Providence)	Democratic	Mar 4, 1913 – Mar 3, 1931	Elected in 1912.	18	65th	19	Elected to finish Broussard's term. Retired.	Nov 6, 1918 – Mar 3, 1921	Democratic	Edward J. Gay (Plaquemine)	22
20	Joseph E. Ransdell (Lake Providence)	Democratic	Mar 4, 1913 – Mar 3, 1931	Re-elected in 1918.	19	66th	19	Elected to finish Broussard's term. Retired.	Nov 6, 1918 – Mar 3, 1921	Democratic	Edward J. Gay (Plaquemine)	22
20	Joseph E. Ransdell (Lake Providence)	Democratic	Mar 4, 1913 – Mar 3, 1931	Re-elected in 1918.	19	67th	20	Elected in 1920.	Mar 4, 1921 – Mar 3, 1933	Democratic	Edwin S. Broussard (New Iberia)	23
20	Joseph E. Ransdell (Lake Providence)	Democratic	Mar 4, 1913 – Mar 3, 1931	Re-elected in 1918.	19	68th	20	Elected in 1920.	Mar 4, 1921 – Mar 3, 1933	Democratic	Edwin S. Broussard (New Iberia)	23
20	Joseph E. Ransdell (Lake Providence)	Democratic	Mar 4, 1913 – Mar 3, 1931	Re-elected in 1924. Lost renomination.	20	69th	20	Elected in 1920.	Mar 4, 1921 – Mar 3, 1933	Democratic	Edwin S. Broussard (New Iberia)	23
20	Joseph E. Ransdell (Lake Providence)	Democratic	Mar 4, 1913 – Mar 3, 1931	Re-elected in 1924. Lost renomination.	20	70th	21	Re-elected in 1926. Lost renomination.	Mar 4, 1921 – Mar 3, 1933	Democratic	Edwin S. Broussard (New Iberia)	23
20	Joseph E. Ransdell (Lake Providence)	Democratic	Mar 4, 1913 – Mar 3, 1931	Re-elected in 1924. Lost renomination.	20	71st	21	Re-elected in 1926. Lost renomination.	Mar 4, 1921 – Mar 3, 1933	Democratic	Edwin S. Broussard (New Iberia)	23
Vacant			Mar 4, 1931 – Jan 25, 1932		21	72nd	21	Re-elected in 1926. Lost renomination.	Mar 4, 1921 – Mar 3, 1933	Democratic	Edwin S. Broussard (New Iberia)	23
21	Huey Long (New Orleans)	Democratic	Jan 25, 1932 – Sep 10, 1935	Elected in 1930, but continued to serve as Louisiana governor until Jan 25, 1932. Assassinated.	21	72nd	21	Re-elected in 1926. Lost renomination.	Mar 4, 1921 – Mar 3, 1933	Democratic	Edwin S. Broussard (New Iberia)	23
21	Huey Long (New Orleans)	Democratic	Jan 25, 1932 – Sep 10, 1935	Elected in 1930, but continued to serve as Louisiana governor until Jan 25, 1932. Assassinated.	21	73rd	22	Elected in 1932.	Mar 4, 1933 – May 14, 1948	Democratic	John Overton (Alexandria)	24
21	Huey Long (New Orleans)	Democratic	Jan 25, 1932 – Sep 10, 1935	Elected in 1930, but continued to serve as Louisiana governor until Jan 25, 1932. Assassinated.	21	74th	22	Elected in 1932.	Mar 4, 1933 – May 14, 1948	Democratic	John Overton (Alexandria)	24
Vacant			Sep 10, 1935 – Jan 31, 1936		21	74th	22	Elected in 1932.	Mar 4, 1933 – May 14, 1948	Democratic	John Overton (Alexandria)	24
22	Rose M. Long (New Orleans)	Democratic	Jan 31, 1936 – Jan 3, 1937	Appointed to continue her husband's term. Elected in 1936 to finish her husband's term. Retired.	21	74th	22	Elected in 1932.	Mar 4, 1933 – May 14, 1948	Democratic	John Overton (Alexandria)	24
23	Allen Ellender (Houma)	Democratic	Jan 3, 1937 – July 27, 1972	Elected in 1936.	22	75th	22	Elected in 1932.	Mar 4, 1933 – May 14, 1948	Democratic	John Overton (Alexandria)	24
23	Allen Ellender (Houma)	Democratic	Jan 3, 1937 – July 27, 1972	Elected in 1936.	22	76th	23	Re-elected in 1938.	Mar 4, 1933 – May 14, 1948	Democratic	John Overton (Alexandria)	24
23	Allen Ellender (Houma)	Democratic	Jan 3, 1937 – July 27, 1972	Elected in 1936.	22	77th	23	Re-elected in 1938.	Mar 4, 1933 – May 14, 1948	Democratic	John Overton (Alexandria)	24
23	Allen Ellender (Houma)	Democratic	Jan 3, 1937 – July 27, 1972	Re-elected in 1942.	23	78th	23	Re-elected in 1938.	Mar 4, 1933 – May 14, 1948	Democratic	John Overton (Alexandria)	24
23	Allen Ellender (Houma)	Democratic	Jan 3, 1937 – July 27, 1972	Re-elected in 1942.	23	79th	24	Re-elected in 1944. Died.	Mar 4, 1933 – May 14, 1948	Democratic	John Overton (Alexandria)	24
23	Allen Ellender (Houma)	Democratic	Jan 3, 1937 – July 27, 1972	Re-elected in 1942.	23	80th	24	Re-elected in 1944. Died.	Mar 4, 1933 – May 14, 1948	Democratic	John Overton (Alexandria)	24
23	Allen Ellender (Houma)	Democratic	Jan 3, 1937 – July 27, 1972	Re-elected in 1942.	23	80th	24		May 14, 1948 – May 18, 1948	Vacant		
23	Allen Ellender (Houma)	Democratic	Jan 3, 1937 – July 27, 1972	Re-elected in 1942.	23	80th	24	Appointed to continue Overton's term. Retired when elected successor qualified.	May 18, 1948 – Dec 30, 1948	Democratic	William C. Feazel (West Monroe)	25
23	Allen Ellender (Houma)	Democratic	Jan 3, 1937 – July 27, 1972	Re-elected in 1942.	23	80th	24	Elected to finish Overton's term.	Dec 31, 1948 – Jan 3, 1987	Democratic	Russell Long (Baton Rouge)	26
23	Allen Ellender (Houma)	Democratic	Jan 3, 1937 – July 27, 1972	Re-elected in 1948.	24	81st	24	Elected to finish Overton's term.	Dec 31, 1948 – Jan 3, 1987	Democratic	Russell Long (Baton Rouge)	26
23	Allen Ellender (Houma)	Democratic	Jan 3, 1937 – July 27, 1972	Re-elected in 1948.	24	82nd	25	Re-elected in 1950.	Dec 31, 1948 – Jan 3, 1987	Democratic	Russell Long (Baton Rouge)	26
23	Allen Ellender (Houma)	Democratic	Jan 3, 1937 – July 27, 1972	Re-elected in 1948.	24	83rd	25	Re-elected in 1950.	Dec 31, 1948 – Jan 3, 1987	Democratic	Russell Long (Baton Rouge)	26
23	Allen Ellender (Houma)	Democratic	Jan 3, 1937 – July 27, 1972	Re-elected in 1954.	25	84th	25	Re-elected in 1950.	Dec 31, 1948 – Jan 3, 1987	Democratic	Russell Long (Baton Rouge)	26
23	Allen Ellender (Houma)	Democratic	Jan 3, 1937 – July 27, 1972	Re-elected in 1954.	25	85th	26	Re-elected in 1956.	Dec 31, 1948 – Jan 3, 1987	Democratic	Russell Long (Baton Rouge)	26
23	Allen Ellender (Houma)	Democratic	Jan 3, 1937 – July 27, 1972	Re-elected in 1954.	25	86th	26	Re-elected in 1956.	Dec 31, 1948 – Jan 3, 1987	Democratic	Russell Long (Baton Rouge)	26
23	Allen Ellender (Houma)	Democratic	Jan 3, 1937 – July 27, 1972	Re-elected in 1960.	26	87th	26	Re-elected in 1956.	Dec 31, 1948 – Jan 3, 1987	Democratic	Russell Long (Baton Rouge)	26
23	Allen Ellender (Houma)	Democratic	Jan 3, 1937 – July 27, 1972	Re-elected in 1960.	26	88th	27	Re-elected in 1962.	Dec 31, 1948 – Jan 3, 1987	Democratic	Russell Long (Baton Rouge)	26
23	Allen Ellender (Houma)	Democratic	Jan 3, 1937 – July 27, 1972	Re-elected in 1960.	26	89th	27	Re-elected in 1962.	Dec 31, 1948 – Jan 3, 1987	Democratic	Russell Long (Baton Rouge)	26
23	Allen Ellender (Houma)	Democratic	Jan 3, 1937 – July 27, 1972	Re-elected in 1966. Died.	27	90th	27	Re-elected in 1962.	Dec 31, 1948 – Jan 3, 1987	Democratic	Russell Long (Baton Rouge)	26
23	Allen Ellender (Houma)	Democratic	Jan 3, 1937 – July 27, 1972	Re-elected in 1966. Died.	27	91st	28	Re-elected in 1968.	Dec 31, 1948 – Jan 3, 1987	Democratic	Russell Long (Baton Rouge)	26
23	Allen Ellender (Houma)	Democratic	Jan 3, 1937 – July 27, 1972	Re-elected in 1966. Died.	27	92nd	28	Re-elected in 1968.	Dec 31, 1948 – Jan 3, 1987	Democratic	Russell Long (Baton Rouge)	26
Vacant			Jul 27, 1972 – Aug 1, 1972		27	92nd	28	Re-elected in 1968.	Dec 31, 1948 – Jan 3, 1987	Democratic	Russell Long (Baton Rouge)	26
24	Elaine Edwards (Crowley)	Democratic	Aug 1, 1972 – Nov 13, 1972	Appointed by her husband to continue Ellender's term. Was not a candidate for the next term. Resigned early when successor qualified.	27	92nd	28	Re-elected in 1968.	Dec 31, 1948 – Jan 3, 1987	Democratic	Russell Long (Baton Rouge)	26
25	J. Bennett Johnston (Shreveport)	Democratic	Nov 14, 1972 – Jan 3, 1997	Appointed to finish Ellender's term, having already been elected to the next term.	27	92nd	28	Re-elected in 1968.	Dec 31, 1948 – Jan 3, 1987	Democratic	Russell Long (Baton Rouge)	26
25	J. Bennett Johnston (Shreveport)	Democratic	Nov 14, 1972 – Jan 3, 1997	Elected in 1972.	28	93rd	28	Re-elected in 1968.	Dec 31, 1948 – Jan 3, 1987	Democratic	Russell Long (Baton Rouge)	26
25	J. Bennett Johnston (Shreveport)	Democratic	Nov 14, 1972 – Jan 3, 1997	Elected in 1972.	28	94th	29	Re-elected in 1974.	Dec 31, 1948 – Jan 3, 1987	Democratic	Russell Long (Baton Rouge)	26
25	J. Bennett Johnston (Shreveport)	Democratic	Nov 14, 1972 – Jan 3, 1997	Elected in 1972.	28	95th	29	Re-elected in 1974.	Dec 31, 1948 – Jan 3, 1987	Democratic	Russell Long (Baton Rouge)	26
25	J. Bennett Johnston (Shreveport)	Democratic	Nov 14, 1972 – Jan 3, 1997	Re-elected in 1978.	29	96th	29	Re-elected in 1974.	Dec 31, 1948 – Jan 3, 1987	Democratic	Russell Long (Baton Rouge)	26
25	J. Bennett Johnston (Shreveport)	Democratic	Nov 14, 1972 – Jan 3, 1997	Re-elected in 1978.	29	97th	30	Re-elected in 1980. Retired.	Dec 31, 1948 – Jan 3, 1987	Democratic	Russell Long (Baton Rouge)	26
25	J. Bennett Johnston (Shreveport)	Democratic	Nov 14, 1972 – Jan 3, 1997	Re-elected in 1978.	29	98th	30	Re-elected in 1980. Retired.	Dec 31, 1948 – Jan 3, 1987	Democratic	Russell Long (Baton Rouge)	26
25	J. Bennett Johnston (Shreveport)	Democratic	Nov 14, 1972 – Jan 3, 1997	Re-elected in 1984.	30	99th	30	Re-elected in 1980. Retired.	Dec 31, 1948 – Jan 3, 1987	Democratic	Russell Long (Baton Rouge)	26
25	J. Bennett Johnston (Shreveport)	Democratic	Nov 14, 1972 – Jan 3, 1997	Re-elected in 1984.	30	100th	31	Elected in 1986.	Jan 3, 1987 – Jan 3, 2005	Democratic	John Breaux (Crowley)	27
25	J. Bennett Johnston (Shreveport)	Democratic	Nov 14, 1972 – Jan 3, 1997	Re-elected in 1984.	30	101st	31	Elected in 1986.	Jan 3, 1987 – Jan 3, 2005	Democratic	John Breaux (Crowley)	27
25	J. Bennett Johnston (Shreveport)	Democratic	Nov 14, 1972 – Jan 3, 1997	Re-elected in 1990. Retired.	31	102nd	31	Elected in 1986.	Jan 3, 1987 – Jan 3, 2005	Democratic	John Breaux (Crowley)	27
25	J. Bennett Johnston (Shreveport)	Democratic	Nov 14, 1972 – Jan 3, 1997	Re-elected in 1990. Retired.	31	103rd	32	Re-elected in 1992.	Jan 3, 1987 – Jan 3, 2005	Democratic	John Breaux (Crowley)	27
25	J. Bennett Johnston (Shreveport)	Democratic	Nov 14, 1972 – Jan 3, 1997	Re-elected in 1990. Retired.	31	104th	32	Re-elected in 1992.	Jan 3, 1987 – Jan 3, 2005	Democratic	John Breaux (Crowley)	27
26	Mary Landrieu (New Orleans)	Democratic	Jan 3, 1997 – Jan 3, 2015	Elected in 1996 in runoff election.	32	105th	32	Re-elected in 1992.	Jan 3, 1987 – Jan 3, 2005	Democratic	John Breaux (Crowley)	27
26	Mary Landrieu (New Orleans)	Democratic	Jan 3, 1997 – Jan 3, 2015	Elected in 1996 in runoff election.	32	106th	33	Re-elected in 1998. Retired.	Jan 3, 1987 – Jan 3, 2005	Democratic	John Breaux (Crowley)	27
26	Mary Landrieu (New Orleans)	Democratic	Jan 3, 1997 – Jan 3, 2015	Elected in 1996 in runoff election.	32	107th	33	Re-elected in 1998. Retired.	Jan 3, 1987 – Jan 3, 2005	Democratic	John Breaux (Crowley)	27
26	Mary Landrieu (New Orleans)	Democratic	Jan 3, 1997 – Jan 3, 2015	Re-elected in 2002 in runoff election.	33	108th	33	Re-elected in 1998. Retired.	Jan 3, 1987 – Jan 3, 2005	Democratic	John Breaux (Crowley)	27
26	Mary Landrieu (New Orleans)	Democratic	Jan 3, 1997 – Jan 3, 2015	Re-elected in 2002 in runoff election.	33	109th	34	Elected in 2004.	Jan 3, 2005 – Jan 3, 2017	Republican	David Vitter (Metairie)	28
26	Mary Landrieu (New Orleans)	Democratic	Jan 3, 1997 – Jan 3, 2015	Re-elected in 2002 in runoff election.	33	110th	34	Elected in 2004.	Jan 3, 2005 – Jan 3, 2017	Republican	David Vitter (Metairie)	28
26	Mary Landrieu (New Orleans)	Democratic	Jan 3, 1997 – Jan 3, 2015	Re-elected in 2008. Lost re-election.	34	111th	34	Elected in 2004.	Jan 3, 2005 – Jan 3, 2017	Republican	David Vitter (Metairie)	28
26	Mary Landrieu (New Orleans)	Democratic	Jan 3, 1997 – Jan 3, 2015	Re-elected in 2008. Lost re-election.	34	112th	35	Re-elected in 2010. Retired.	Jan 3, 2005 – Jan 3, 2017	Republican	David Vitter (Metairie)	28
26	Mary Landrieu (New Orleans)	Democratic	Jan 3, 1997 – Jan 3, 2015	Re-elected in 2008. Lost re-election.	34	113th	35	Re-elected in 2010. Retired.	Jan 3, 2005 – Jan 3, 2017	Republican	David Vitter (Metairie)	28
27	Bill Cassidy (Baton Rouge)	Republican	Jan 3, 2015 – present	Elected in 2014 in runoff election.	35	114th	35	Re-elected in 2010. Retired.	Jan 3, 2005 – Jan 3, 2017	Republican	David Vitter (Metairie)	28
27	Bill Cassidy (Baton Rouge)	Republican	Jan 3, 2015 – present	Elected in 2014 in runoff election.	35	115th	36	Elected in 2016 in runoff election.	Jan 3, 2017 – present	Republican	John Kennedy (Madisonville)	29
27	Bill Cassidy (Baton Rouge)	Republican	Jan 3, 2015 – present	Elected in 2014 in runoff election.	35	116th	36	Elected in 2016 in runoff election.	Jan 3, 2017 – present	Republican	John Kennedy (Madisonville)	29
27	Bill Cassidy (Baton Rouge)	Republican	Jan 3, 2015 – present	Re-elected in 2020. Lost renomination.	36	117th	36	Elected in 2016 in runoff election.	Jan 3, 2017 – present	Republican	John Kennedy (Madisonville)	29
27	Bill Cassidy (Baton Rouge)	Republican	Jan 3, 2015 – present	Re-elected in 2020. Lost renomination.	36	118th	37	Re-elected in 2022.	Jan 3, 2017 – present	Republican	John Kennedy (Madisonville)	29
27	Bill Cassidy (Baton Rouge)	Republican	Jan 3, 2015 – present	Re-elected in 2020. Lost renomination.	36	119th	37	Re-elected in 2022.	Jan 3, 2017 – present	Republican	John Kennedy (Madisonville)	29
28	Julia Letlow (elect) (Start)	Republican	Taking office Jan 3, 2027	Elected in 2026.	37	120th	37	Re-elected in 2022.	Jan 3, 2017 – present	Republican	John Kennedy (Madisonville)	29
28	Julia Letlow (elect) (Start)	Republican	Taking office Jan 3, 2027	Elected in 2026.	37	121st	38	To be determined in the 2028 election.				
28	Julia Letlow (elect) (Start)	Republican	Taking office Jan 3, 2027	Elected in 2026.	37	122nd	38	To be determined in the 2028 election.				
To be determined in the 2032 election.					38	123rd	38	To be determined in the 2028 election.				

== See also ==
- Elections in Louisiana
- List of United States representatives from Louisiana
- Louisiana's congressional delegations
