= 1944 United States Senate election in Louisiana =

1944 Democratic Senate primary election in Louisiana
- September 12, 1944
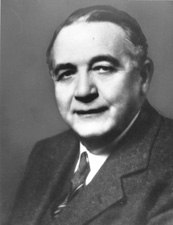

Nominee	John H. Overton	E. A. Stephens	Griffin Hawkins
Party	Democratic	Democratic	Democratic
Popular vote	151,886	68,408	19,067
Percentage	61.64%	27.76%	7.74%
- Parish results Overton: 30–40% 40–50% 50–60% 60–70% 70–80% 80–90% Stephens: 40–50% 50–60% 70–80% Hawkins: 40–50% 60–70%
U.S. senator before election
John H. Overton
Democratic
Elected U.S. Senator
John H. Overton
Democratic

The 1944 United States Senate election in Louisiana was held on November 7, 1944. Incumbent Democratic Senator John H. Overton was elected to a third term in office.

On September 12, Overton won the Democratic primary with 61.64% of the vote.

At this time, Louisiana was a one-party state (no other party had run a candidate for Senate since the passage of the Seventeenth Amendment), and the Democratic nomination was tantamount to victory. Overton won the November general election without an opponent.

== Democratic primary ==
=== Candidates ===
- Charles S. Gerth, New Orleans businessman
- Griffin T. Hawkins, Lake Charles district attorney
- John H. Overton, incumbent Senator since 1933
- E. A. Stephens, candidate for Senate in 1942

=== Campaign ===
E. A. Stephens criticized Overton for having been "an isolationist before Pearl Harbor."

Griffin Hawkins campaigned for the preservation of white supremacy, using the slogans "Insure White Supremacy" and "Protect Our Future."

On the night before the primary, Senator Overton held a radio address to rebut attacks on his record. Both Hawkins and Gerth predicted that no candidate would receive a majority and the primary would require a runoff; Hawkins thought he would lead the field and Gerth, more humbly, said he would finish second to Overton. Stephens expressed confidence that he would win the nomination outright, and Overton confidently projected that he would win a majority of two to one against the field.

=== Results ===
1944 United States Senate Democratic primary
Party	Candidate	Votes	%
Democratic	John H. Overton (incumbent)	151,886	61.64%
Democratic	E. A. Stephens	68,408	24.76%
Democratic	Griffin T. Hawkins	19,067	7.74%
Democratic	Charles S. Gerth	7,069	2.87%
Total votes		246,430	100.00%

== General election ==
1944 United States Senate election
Party	Candidate	Votes	%	±%
Democratic	John H. Overton (incumbent)	287,365	100.00%	▲0.16
Total votes		287,365	100.00%	
