= 1932 United States Senate election in Louisiana =

1932 Democratic Senate primary election in Louisiana
- September 13, 1932
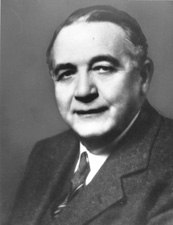

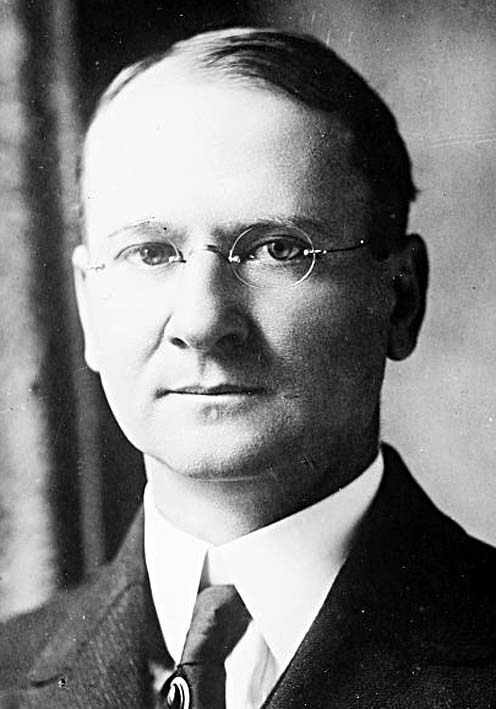
Nominee	John H. Overton	Edwin S. Broussard
Party	Democratic	Democratic
Popular vote	181,464	124,935
Percentage	59.23%	40.78%
U.S. senator before election
Edwin S. Broussard
Democratic
Elected U.S. Senator
John H. Overton
Democratic

The 1932 United States Senate election in Louisiana was held on November 8, 1932. Incumbent Democratic Senator Edwin Broussard ran for a third term in office, but was defeated in the primary by U.S. Representative John H. Overton.

On September 13, Overton won the Democratic primary with 61.64% of the vote.

At this time, Louisiana was a one-party state (no other party had run a candidate for Senate since the passage of the Seventeenth Amendment), and the Democratic nomination was tantamount to victory. Overton won the November general election without an opponent.

== Democratic primary ==
=== Candidates ===
- Edwin S. Broussard, incumbent Senator
- John H. Overton, U.S. Representative from Marksville

=== Results ===
1932 United States Senate Democratic primary
Party	Candidate	Votes	%
Democratic	John H. Overton	181,464	59.23%
Democratic	Edwin S. Broussard (incumbent)	124,935	40.78%
Total votes		306,399	100.00%

== General election ==
1932 United States Senate election
Party	Candidate	Votes	%	±%
Democratic	John Overton	249,189	100.00%	Steady
Total votes		249,189	100.00%	
