= 1968 United States Senate election in Louisiana =

1968 Democratic Senate primary election in Louisiana
- August 17, 1968
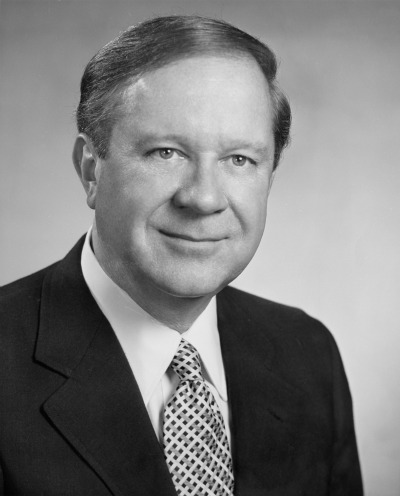

| Nominee | Russell B. Long | Maurice Blache |
| Party | Democratic | Democratic |
| Popular vote | 494,467 | 73,791 |
| Percentage | 87.02% | 12.99% |
- Parish results Long: 60–70% 70–80% 80–90% >90% Blache: 60–70%
U.S. senator before election
Russell Long
Democratic
Elected U.S. Senator
Russell Long
Democratic

The 1968 United States Senate election in Louisiana was held on November 5, 1968. Incumbent Democratic Senator Russell Long was elected to a fifth term in office.

On August 17, Long won the Democratic primary with 87.02% of the vote. At this time, Louisiana was a one-party state and the Democratic nomination was tantamount to victory. Long won the November general election without an opponent.

== Democratic primary ==
=== Candidates ===
- Maurice Blache
- Russell Long, incumbent Senator

=== Results ===
1968 United States Senate Democratic primary
| Party | Candidate | Votes | % |
|---|---|---|---|
| Democratic | Russell Long (incumbent) | 494,467 | 87.02% |
| Democratic | Maurice Blache | 73,791 | 12.99% |
| Total votes | | 568,258 | 100.00% |

== General election ==
1968 United States Senate election
| Party | Candidate | Votes | % | ±% |
|---|---|---|---|---|
| Democratic | Russell Long (incumbent) | 518,586 | 100.00% | Steady |
| Total votes | | 518,586 | 100.00% | |
