= William C. Feazel =

American politician (1895–1965)

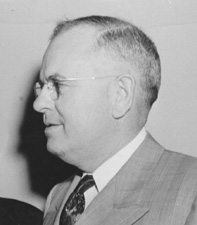

United States Senator from Louisiana
- In office May 18, 1948 – December 30, 1948
- Appointed by: Earl Long
- Preceded by: John H. Overton
- Succeeded by: Russell B. Long

Louisiana State Representative from Ouachita Parish
- In office 1932–1936
- Preceded by: Tandy T. Webb; F. C. Bennett
- Succeeded by: Paul Fink; W. B. Inabnett

Personal details
- Born: William Crosson Feazel; June 10, 1895 Farmerville, Union Parish; Louisiana, U.S.
- Died: March 16, 1965 (aged 69) Shreveport, Caddo Parish, Louisiana
- Resting place: Hasley Cemetery in West Monroe, Louisiana
- Party: Democratic
- Children: Lallage Feazel Wall Son-in-law Shady R. Wall

William Crosson Feazel (June 10, 1895 - March 16, 1965) was a United States Senator from Louisiana. Born near Farmerville in Union Parish, he attended the public schools and engaged as an independent oil and gas producer.

Feazel was a member of the Louisiana House of Representatives from 1932 to 1936. He was appointed by Governor Earl Kemp Long on May 18, 1948, as a Democrat to the U.S. Senate to fill the vacancy caused by the death of John H. Overton. Feazel served from May 18 to December 30, 1948. He was not a candidate for election to the vacancy in 1948 and resumed the oil and gas business in Monroe and Shreveport. He was a resident of West Monroe, and died in Shreveport in 1965; interment was in Hasley Cemetery, West Monroe. His seat went to his fellow Democrat, Russell B. Long, the son of Huey P. Long, Jr.

Louisiana House of Representatives
Preceded by Tandy T. Webb; F.C. Bennett (as one of two members)	' Louisiana State Representative for Ouachita Parish; 1932–1936; Served alongside: J. Porter Burgess (as one of two members)'	Succeeded by Paul Fink; W.B. Inabnett (as one of two members)
U.S. Senate
Preceded by John H. Overton	U.S. senator (Class 3) from Louisiana; May 18, 1948 – December 30, 1948; Served alongside: Allen J. Ellender	Succeeded by Russell B. Long
