= Russell B. Long =

American politician (1918–2003)

United States Senator from Louisiana
- In office December 31, 1948 – January 3, 1987
- Preceded by: William C. Feazel
- Succeeded by: John Breaux
Senate positions
Senate Majority Whip
In office January 3, 1965 – January 3, 1969
Leader	Mike Mansfield
Preceded by	Hubert Humphrey
Succeeded by	Ted Kennedy
Chair of the Senate Finance Committee
In office January 10, 1966 – January 3, 1981
Preceded by	Harry F. Byrd
Succeeded by	Bob Dole
Ranking Member of the Senate Finance Committee
In office January 3, 1981 – January 3, 1987
Preceded by	Bob Dole
Succeeded by	Bob Packwood

Personal details
- Born: Russell Billiu Long; November 3, 1918 Shreveport, Louisiana, U.S.
- Died: May 9, 2003 (aged 84) Washington, D.C., U.S.
- Party: Democratic
- Spouses: Katherine Hattic (m. 1939; div. 1969); Carolyn Bason (m. 1969)
- Children: 2
- Parents: Huey Long (father); Rose McConnell (mother)
- Relatives: Long family
- Education: Louisiana State University (BA, LLB)

Military service
- Allegiance: United States
- Branch/service: United States Navy; Navy Reserve
- Years of service: 1942–1945
- Rank: Lieutenant
- Battles/wars: World War II; Operation Torch; Allied invasion of Sicily; Allied invasion of Italy; Operation Dragoon
- Awards: Four Battle stars for service in North Africa and Europe
- Russell B. Long's voice Long speaks in opposition to continuing televised coverage of Senate proceedings Recorded July 29, 1986

Russell Billiu Long (November 3, 1918 – May 9, 2003) was an American Democratic politician and United States senator from Louisiana from 1948 until 1987. The chairman of the Senate Finance Committee from 1966 to 1981, Long was instrumental in the implementation of President Lyndon Johnson's Great Society and War on Poverty programs. Long also served as Assistant Majority Leader (Senate Majority Whip) from 1965 to 1969, he was referred to as the 'Father of the Earned Income Tax Credit'.

The son of Senators Huey Long and Rose McConnell Long, Russell Long served during the administrations of eight US presidents, from Truman to Reagan. Long quietly wielded enormous power in the Senate and shaped some of the most significant tax legislation of the twentieth century.

As chairman of the Senate Finance Committee, Long held jurisdiction over 100 percent of all federal revenue and 40 percent of all government spending, including Social Security, Medicare, Medicaid, unemployment insurance, welfare and food assistance programs, foreign trade, and tariffs. In 1980 he was voted the most effective chairman and most effective debater by his colleagues in a U.S. News & World Report survey. In a 1982 survey, Long was voted the most influential Democrat by his Senate colleagues. The Wall Street Journal once called him "the fourth branch of government." Upon his retirement in 1987, Long had a 75 percent approval rating among Louisiana voters.

== Early life ==
Russell Billiu Long was born in Shreveport, Louisiana, on November 3, 1918, the son of Huey P. Long, Jr. and Rose McConnell Long. Originally named Huey Pierce Long III, his father arrived shortly after his birth and changed his name to Russell. He was named for Russell Billiu, his mother's favorite cousin.

Long received his Bachelor of Arts from Louisiana State University in 1939 and his Bachelor of Law from the Paul M. Hebert Law Center in 1942. He was a member of Delta Kappa Epsilon fraternity (Zeta Zeta chapter). During his undergraduate years, he served as freshman class president, sophomore arts and sciences president and chairman of the sophomore presidents, and student body president. While a student at LSU, Long met and married Katherine Hattic. They had two daughters, Kay and Pamela. In 1969 they divorced and he married Carolyn Bason.

=== World War II ===
In June 1942, during World War II, Long entered the United States Navy Reserve. He participated in the Allied invasions of North Africa, Sicily, Italy, and Southern France and commanded a landing craft transport vessel in the first-wave landing at Cavalaire-sur-Mer. He was awarded four campaign medal battle stars for his service. He was discharged as a lieutenant in December 1945. In 1947, he was elected first vice commander of Louisiana's AMVETS organization.

== Senate career ==
Upon his return from the war, Long practiced law. In 1947, he campaigned for the return of his uncle, Earl Long, to the governorship. When Earl Long took office in 1948, he appointed Russell Long as his executive counsel. Russell Long was elected in 1948 to fill the U.S. Senate vacancy created by the death of John Overton, which had been filled temporarily by the appointment of William Feazel. In winning election to the Senate, Long became the only person in U.S. history to be preceded in that chamber by both his father and his mother. He was elected on November 2, 1948, one day before his 30th birthday, and took office on December 31, thus meeting the constitutional requirement that Senators be at least 30 years old upon taking office. Because he had filled a vacancy, Long gained a few days of seniority over others in the Senate class of 1948, including Lyndon B. Johnson and Hubert Humphrey, whose terms began January 3, 1949.

From 1953 to 1987, Long was a member of the tax-writing Senate Finance Committee; he served as its chairman for 15 years, from 1966 until 1981, when Republicans assumed control of the Senate and took over the chairmanships. Long served as President Lyndon B. Johnson's Senate floor leader, helping gain passage of the bills that enacted many of the Great Society programs, including the 1965 creation of Medicare. He served as the Democratic Assistant Majority Leader (whip) from 1965 to 1969. As the Democratic ranking member of the Senate Finance Committee, he served alongside Republican chairmen Bob Dole and Bob Packwood, and was instrumental in the passage of the Tax Reform Act of 1986.

In November 1966, Long had a chance encounter on an airplane with New Orleans District Attorney Jim Garrison. During the course of conversation, Long expressed his doubts about the Warren Commission, which concluded that Lee Harvey Oswald and nobody else killed President John F. Kennedy. This episode, depicted in the 1991 Oliver Stone film "JFK," influenced Garrison to open his investigation and led to the trial of Clay Shaw.

Long had an encyclopedic knowledge of the federal tax code. He realized that he could achieve his legislative goals most effectively by attaching his priorities as amendments to tax bills rather than sponsoring legislation under his name. With all federal revenue and forty percent of all government spending controlled by the Senate Finance Committee, Long exercised authority over all major revenue bills and entitlement programs, as well as foreign trade and tariffs. According to biographer Bob Mann, "For almost four decades, no single revenue measure passed through Congress without [Long's] influence."

=== Legislative accomplishments ===
Long's legislative priorities balanced a desire to help the disadvantaged, while providing tax relief for the middle class and small businesses. He was particularly sensitive to the plight of the elderly poor, and his colleagues referred to Long's various aid proposals as his "grandma amendments."

In 1956, Long led the first major expansion of Social Security to include benefits for the disabled and, later, to their dependents. Long's success in maneuvering the late President John F. Kennedy's major tax reduction bill forward in early 1964 confirmed his reputation as a rising leader.

Long created the earned income tax credit (EITC), the largest and most effective anti-poverty assistance program in the US, which reduces the tax burden on poor working families and rewards work in place of direct welfare payments. In 2016, the EITC lifted an estimate 6.5 million Americans out of poverty, including 3.3 million children. It is credited with reducing the severity of poverty for an additional 21.5 million families, including 7.7 million children. Especially crucial for low-income, single working mothers, the EITC increased lifetime average earnings for less-educated women by 17 percent, leading to long-term income growth in earnings and Social Security income. In 2019, the EITC boosted the incomes of 9 million women of color, who disproportionately benefit from the tax credit.

Long was the architect of employee stock ownership plans (ESOPs), employee benefit plans designed to allow employees to invest in the stock of their employers and share in the prosperity created by their work. To curb the growing influence of big money in politics, Long created the mechanism for public financing of presidential campaigns, allowing taxpayers to allocate $1 of taxes for a presidential election fund (the "dollar checkoff"). He also championed the Child Support Enforcement Act, requiring unmarried fathers to financially support their children.

During his time in the Senate, Long was a strong champion of certain tax breaks for businesses. He once said, "I have become convinced you're going to have to have capital if you're going to have capitalism." On the other hand, he was aware of some of the political ramifications of "tax reform" and stated that it simply meant, "Don't tax you, don't tax me, tax that fellow behind the tree!"

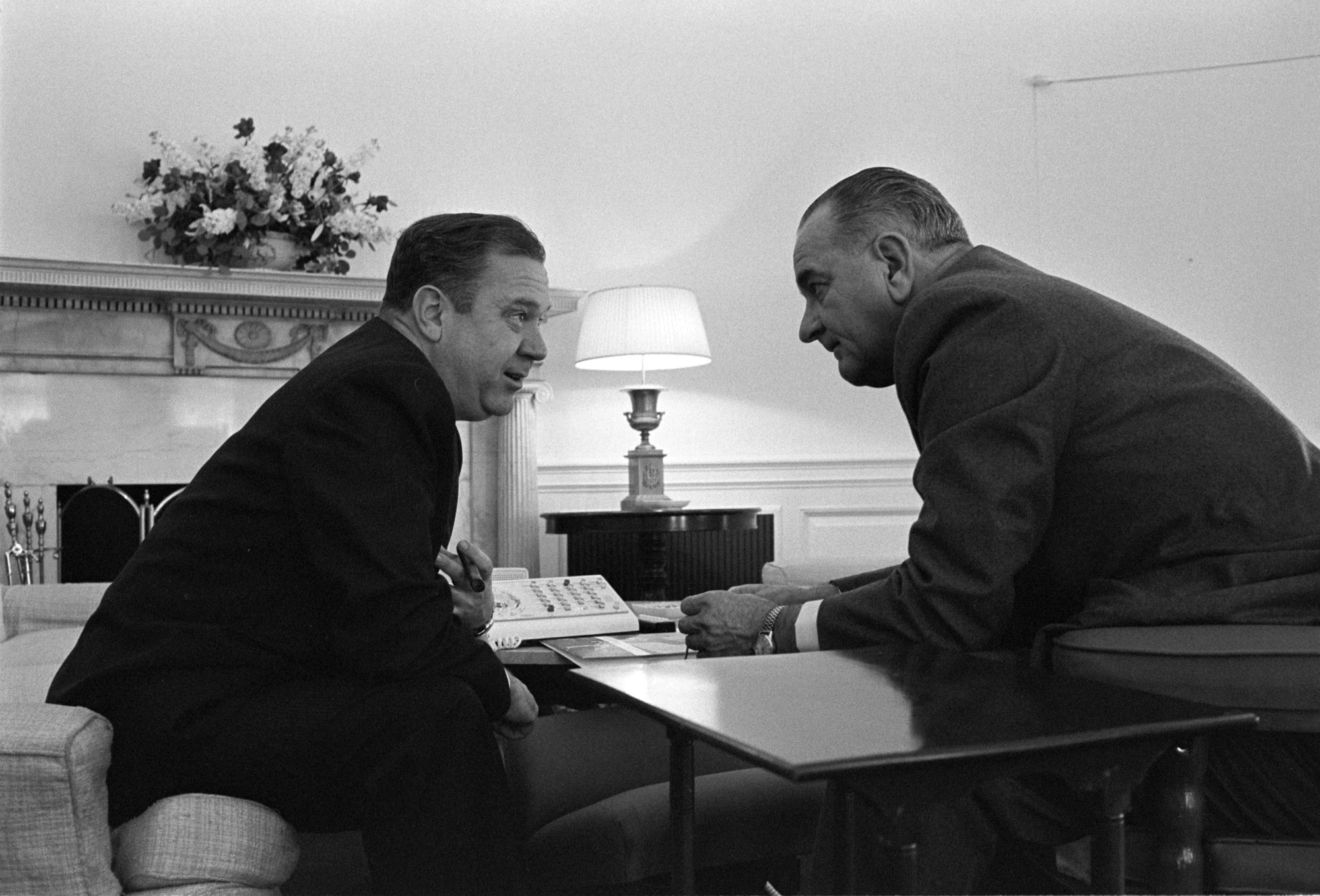
Senator Long confers with President Lyndon B. Johnson

Long was legendary for achieving his legislative priorities by attaching small, yet significant, amendments to tax bills. In 1966, at the request of then-National Football League Commissioner Pete Rozelle, Long and Representative Hale Boggs used their influence to pass legislation that allowed for the merger of the American Football League and the National Football League (NFL), a provision that Long inserted into a tax bill. Without the legislation, the merger would have been prohibited by anti-trust laws governing monopolies. In exchange for ensuring the passage of the legislation, Long and Boggs requested that Rozelle award the next NFL expansion franchise to New Orleans. Rozelle complied, and Long and Boggs joined Rozelle in announcing on November 1, 1966, that New Orleans had obtained the New Orleans Saints.

In 1972, Long single-handedly created the United States District Court for the Middle District of Louisiana, comprising the nine parishes surrounding Baton Rouge. In a House-passed tax bill to allow a marine from Thibodaux to keep an excess federal payment of $547 that he received on active duty, Long added "that Section 98 of Title 28 of the United States Code is amended as 'Louisiana is divided into three judicial districts to be known as the Eastern, Middle and Western Districts of Louisiana.'"

=== Elections ===
==== 1948 ====
To win the Senate seat vacated by the death of Democrat John Holmes Overton, Long first defeated Judge Robert F. Kennon of Minden in the Democratic primary, 264,143 (51 percent) to 253,668 (49 percent). The margin was 10,475 votes. Long overwhelmed Republican oilman Clem S. Clarke of Shreveport in the general election, gaining 306,337 votes (75 percent) to 102,339 (25 percent). Clarke had been the first Louisiana Republican US Senate nominee in 1914, when the Seventeenth Amendment to the United States Constitution was implemented for the popular election of senators. He carried Iberia, Caddo (Long's native parish), Lafayette, and East Baton Rouge parishes. In 1948, Clarke had tried to get the courts to forbid Long from running on both the Harry Truman and Strom Thurmond slates in Louisiana, but he failed to convince the judges. Votes for Long from the Truman and Thurmond slates were counted.

==== 1950 ====
After being elected in 1948, Long never again faced a close contest for re-election. Because the 1948 election was for a two-year unexpired term, Long had to run again in 1950 for his first full six-year term. That year, he had no trouble defeating the intra-party challenge of Malcolm Lafargue. A great-nephew of the late Senator John H. Overton, Lafargue resigned as US Attorney for the United States District Court for the Western District of Louisiana in Shreveport to make the Senate race. In an advertisement, Lafargue questioned how Long was the self-proclaimed "poor man's friend" because the incumbent "pretends to sneer at millionaires, but Long is a millionaire himself."

After winning the Democratic primary, Long overwhelmed his Republican opponent, Charles Sidney Gerth (1882–1964), a businessman from New Orleans. In 1948, he had run as a Democrat for senator against Long's colleague, Allen J. Ellender. In the 1950 general election, Long polled 220,907 (87.7 percent) to Gerth's 30,931 (12.3 percent).

==== 1962 ====
In 1962, Long defeated Philemon Andrews "Phil" St. Amant (1918-2019), a retired career United States Army lieutenant colonel from Baton Rouge, 407,162 votes (80.2 percent) to 100,843 votes (19.8 percent) in the Democratic primary. In 2016, St. Amant was listed by the Louisiana Secretary of State as a "No Party" voter.

Long trounced his Republican challenger Taylor W. O'Hearn, a Shreveport attorney and accountant, with 318,838 votes (75.6 percent) to O'Hearn's 103,066 (24.4 percent). Later O'Hearn was elected as state representative for Caddo Parish.

==== 1963 and 1964 campaigns ====
Speculation persisted that Long would run for governor in the 1963 Democratic primary. He had received encouragement from "all the shades of factionalism in the state." Instead, he endorsed his cousin, Gillis W. Long, the US representative from the since-disbanded Eighth Congressional District based about Alexandria. At the time, Long was second to the aging Senator Harry F. Byrd of Virginia on the Senate Finance Committee and had already presided as chairman during Byrd's prolonged absence because of failing health.

As a result of Johnson's signing of the Civil Rights Act of 1964, Long (along with more than a dozen other southern Senators, including Herman Talmadge and Richard Russell, both of Georgia) did not attend the 1964 Democratic National Convention in Atlantic City. However, Long defied conventional wisdom by delivering a television address in Louisiana in which he strongly endorsed the Johnson-Humphrey ticket, which lost the state to the Republican Barry M. Goldwater-William E. Miller electors. The action had no consequence on Long's future, however, as Republicans declined to challenge his re-election in 1968, 1974, and 1980.

==== 1968 ====
In 1968, Long overpowered a primary rival, Maurice P. Blache Sr. (1917–1991), to win renomination. He was unopposed in the general election when the presumed Republican candidate, Richard Kilbourne, the district attorney in East Feliciana Parish, withdrew from the race. Kilbourne abandoned his campaign so that his party could concentrate on trying to elect David C. Treen to represent Louisiana's 2nd congressional district over incumbent Democrat Hale Boggs.

==== 1974 ====
In the 1974 Democratic primary, Long defeated state Insurance Commissioner Sherman A. Bernard of Westwego in Jefferson Parish, 520,606 (74.7 percent) to 131,540 (18.9 percent). Another 44,341 ballots (6.4 percent) went to a third candidate, Annie Smart. Louisiana Republican state chairman James H. Boyce of Baton Rouge said that the party could not find a viable candidate to challenge Long.

==== 1980 ====
Long with the statue of his father, Sen. Huey P. Long, in Statuary Hall of the U.S. Capitol.

In 1980, Long defeated State Representative Woody Jenkins of Baton Rouge, 484,770 (57.6 percent) to 325,922 (38.8 percent) in the state's nonpartisan blanket primary. During the 1980 campaign, Long's friend and colleague, Robert "Bob" J. Dole, the Kansas Republican who had been his party's vice presidential nominee in 1976 and who would be the presidential nominee in 1996, made a television commercial for Long in the race against Jenkins. Dole and Long were both running for re-election that year. The 1980 primary was the last time that Long's name was on a ballot. Jenkins had run against Johnston in 1978 and ran again in a disputed outcome against Mary Landrieu in 1996 for the seat Johnston vacated on retirement.

Jenkins won majorities in only four parishes, Rapides, La Salle, Iberia, and St. Tammany. When Jenkins claimed to have received 55 percent of the votes cast by whites, Long called the claim "racist." Long urged the media to investigate Jenkins' claim. He contended that his own research was in conflict with Jenkins' assertion.

Near the end of his last term in office, Long hired the young journalist Bob Mann as his press secretary. Mann, who now holds the Douglas Manship Chair of Journalism at LSU, later penned the 1992 book, Legacy to Power: Senator Russell B. Long of Louisiana.

=== Retirement ===
After he considered and rejected a run for governor of Louisiana, Long retired from the Senate in January 1987. Senator J. Bennett Johnston said of his colleague: "His absence will leave a huge void that's going to be very, very difficult to fill here in Washington." Edward J. Steimel, president of the Louisiana Association of Business and Industry, described Long as "very well regarded in the business community nationally."

Summing up his career in the Senate, President Ronald Reagan called him a "legend... one of the most skillful legislators, compromisers and legislative strategists in history."

In 1986, Democratic US Representative John Breaux of Crowley, a former legislative aide and House successor of Governor Edwards, was elected to succeed Long in the Senate. Breaux defeated the Republican US Representative Henson Moore of Baton Rouge. Moore had led the balloting in the nonpartisan blanket primary but lost the general election to Breaux in a nationally Democratic year.

Long remained in Washington, D.C., after his senatorial retirement as a highly-desired lobbyist. For a brief period following his retirement, he was a partner in the law firm of Finley, Kumble, Wagner, Underberg, Manley, Myerson & Casey, which dissolved in 1987. He later founded the Long Law Firm, where he remained a partner until his death. Long served on the board of directors of the New York Stock Exchange, Lowe's Companies, Inc., and Metropolitan Life Insurance Company.

In 1996, he endorsed Mary Landrieu, the Democratic nominee, in the race to succeed retiring Senator J. Bennett Johnston. Coincidentally, Landrieu defeated the same Woody Jenkins, a Democrat-turned-Republican, whom Long had beaten in Long's last Senate race in 1980. Long was particularly critical of Jenkins's national sales tax proposal to supersede the federal income tax, a move that Long stated would benefit "the wealthy."

== Political positions ==
Long was known as a political realist, rather than an ideologue. Inspired by his father's left-wing populist Share Our Wealth governing philosophy, he endorsed liberal social programs such as Franklin D. Roosevelt's New Deal, Harry S. Truman's Fair Deal, John F. Kennedy's New Frontier, and Lyndon B. Johnson's Great Society. He was much more conservative than his father in the areas of business policy, states' rights, and foreign policy. In labor relations, Long voted 56% of the time with the AFL-CIO position, and the National Chamber of Commerce reported that he supported the business position 63% of the time. Long was a formidable protector of Louisiana's industries, particularly the oil and gas industry.

Long's positions on race relations evolved over the course of his 38-year career. Despite his support for segregation in his early career, Long received more than 90% of the African American vote in his seven elections to the Senate. He was frequently criticized for his moderate racial views by the White Citizens' Councils and the Ku Klux Klan.

As a junior member of the Senate in the 1950s, Long joined his Southern colleagues with a segregationist voting record and signed the Southern Manifesto on 1956, a position that he later repudiated as required by the white majority of voters at the time. Long described his hardline colleagues' refusal to compromise "disastrous" and advocated gradualism toward desegregation. He expressed his concern that moving too quickly would spark violence and divisions among the races but failing in practically improving the daily lives of African Americans.

In 1953, Long broke ranks with his Southern colleagues by supporting Alaskan and Hawaiian statehood, the latter of which had been blocked for a quarter of a century by the Solid South's refusal to accept the possibility of non-whites in Congress as well as the possibility of adding two civil rights votes in the Senate.

Long opposed judicial intrusions into police power by the Warren Court. Following the Supreme Court's decision in Brown v. Board of Education in 1954, he proposed a constitutional amendment to limit Supreme Court justices to six- or twelve-year terms.

Long became Assistant Majority Leader (Majority Whip) in 1965 and advanced in seniority to the chairmanship of the Senate Finance Committee the following year. He championed the economic interests of minorities, the poor, and the elderly by steering the landmark social welfare legislation of President Johnson's Great Society and war on poverty. During his 15-year tenure as Senate Finance Committee Chairman, Long exercised authority over all federal revenue collection and a vast array of entitlement spending. His most-recognized achievements include the creation of Social Security benefits for the disabled and their dependents, Medicare and Medicaid, child support enforcement, Employee Stock Ownership Plans (ESOPS) and the Earned Income Tax Credit (EITC), the centerpiece of American poverty alleviation efforts.

Long was one of only four southern senators to vote for the Economic Opportunity Act of 1964, which included most of President Johnson's anti-poverty programs. As Majority Whip, he guided through the Senate much of the Great Society legislation, including Medicare, the Appalachian Regional Development Act, the Economic Opportunity amendments, the Clean Water Act, the Elementary and Secondary Education Act, and the Immigration and Nationality Act.

Long was the only southern senator who voted to outlaw the poll tax in both 1960 and 1965. To break the Congressional gridlock over voting rights, he urged Presidents Kennedy and Johnson to send federal registrars throughout the South to register black voters. Although he secured rare concessions in the Voting Rights Act of 1965, he ultimately voted against it but refused to join a filibuster against it. He confided in President Johnson that he "felt the bill should have passed and made applicable to Louisiana." Long subsequently voted to expand and strengthen the Voting Rights Act in 1975 and 1982, which he co-sponsored.

In 1960, Long was the first Southern senator in the 20th century to hire black staff members. Long's Senate office launched the careers of many trailblazing African Americans, including Kerry Pourciau, the first black student body president of LSU.

Rev. Martin Luther King Jr., described Long's 1965 election as the Assistant Majority Leader as a "blessing in disguise" in that he "may bring an end to the solid Southern bloc." Following King's assassination in 1968, Long reflected on his own father's assassination, which he attributed to Huey Long's repeal of the Louisiana poll tax and liberal views on race shortly before his death: "I've tried to continue some of the work he started – to help the poor people of our state and nation, both colored and whites." In 1983, Long supported the creation of the federal holiday of Martin Luther King Jr. Day.

Long supported the creation of the Senate Select Committee to investigate the 1972 presidential campaigns after the Watergate break-in. He co-chaired the special Congressional Committee on Internal Revenue Taxation that determined President Nixon owed nearly half-a-million dollars in back taxes.

To combat the economic stagflation of the 1970s, Long guided President Ford's 1974 Trade Reform Act and 1975 tax cut bill through Congress, which included the creation of the Earned Income Tax Credit (EITC) and Employee Stock Ownership Plans (ESOPS).

Long opposed President Carter's energy policies but supported Carter's implementation of stimulus tax cuts, the creation of the Department of Energy and the Panama Canal Treaty. Long supported Carter's 1979 loan guarantees to save the Chrysler Corporation from bankruptcy, which included a $175 million Employee Stock Ownership Plan for Chrysler's workers.

== Illness and death ==
Russell Long died from heart failure on May 9, 2003. At the time of his death, Russell Long was the last living former US senator who assumed office in the 1940s. The funeral was held in Baton Rouge, and included eulogies delivered by his grandson, attorney Russell Long Mosely, and former colleagues U.S. Senators J. Bennett Johnston and John Breaux.

== Electoral history ==
1948 United States Senate special election in Louisiana
Party	Candidate	Votes	%
Democratic	Russell B. Long	306,336	74.96
Republican	Clem S. Clarke	102,331	25.04
Total votes		408,667	100.0
Democratic hold			

1950 United States Senate election in Louisiana
Primary election
Party	Candidate	Votes	%
Democratic	Russell B. Long (incumbent)	359,330	68.46
Democratic	Harley C. Stump	156,918	29.9
Democratic	Newt V. Mills	8,611	1.64
Total votes		524,829	100.00
General election
Democratic	Russell B. Long (incumbent)	220,907	87.72
Republican	Charles S. Gerth	30,931	12.28
Total votes		251,838	100.00
Democratic hold			

1956 United States Senate election in Louisiana
Party	Candidate	Votes	%
Democratic	Russell B. Long (incumbent)	335,564	100.00
Total votes		335,564	100.00
Democratic hold			

1962 United States Senate election in Louisiana
Primary election
Party	Candidate	Votes	%
Democratic	Russell B. Long (incumbent)	407,162	80.15
Democratic	Philemont St. Amant	100,843	19.85
Total votes		508,005	100.00
General election
Democratic	Russell B. Long (incumbent)	318,838	75.46
Republican	Taylor W. O'Hearn	103,666	24.54
Total votes		422,504	100.00
Democratic hold			

1968 United States Senate election in Louisiana
Primary election
Party	Candidate	Votes	%
Democratic	Russell B. Long (incumbent)	494,467	87.02
Democratic	Maurice Blache	73,791	12.99
Total votes		568,258	100.00
General election
Democratic	Russell B. Long (incumbent)	518,586	100.00
Total votes		518,586	100.00
Democratic hold			

1974 United States Senate election in Louisiana
Primary election
Party	Candidate	Votes	%
Democratic	Russell B. Long (incumbent)	520,606	74.75
Democratic	Sherman A. Bernard	131,540	18.89
Democratic	Annie Smart	44,341	6.37
Total votes		696,487	100.00
General election
Democratic	Russell B. Long (incumbent)	434,643	100.00
Total votes		434,643	100.00
Democratic hold			

1980 United States Senate election in Louisiana
Party	Candidate	Votes	%
Democratic	Russell B. Long (incumbent)	484,770	57.64
Democratic	Woody Jenkins	325,992	38.76
Republican	Jerry C. Bardwell	13,739	1.63
Republican	Robert M. Ross	10,208	1.21
Independent	Naomi Bracey	6,374	0.76
Total votes		843,362	100.00
Democratic hold			

Party political offices
Preceded by John H. Overton	Democratic nominee for U.S. Senator from Louisiana (Class 3); 1948, 1950, 1956, 1962, 1968, 1974, 1980	Succeeded by John Breaux
Preceded by Hubert Humphrey	Senate Democratic Whip; 1965–1969	Succeeded by Ted Kennedy
U.S. Senate
Preceded by William C. Feazel	U.S. Senator (Class 3) from Louisiana; 1948–1987; Served alongside: Allen J. Ellender, Elaine S. Edwards, J. Bennett Johnston	Succeeded by John Breaux
Preceded by Hubert Humphrey	Senate Majority Whip; 1965–1969	Succeeded by Ted Kennedy
Preceded by Harry F. Byrd	Chair of the Senate Finance Committee; 1965–1981	Succeeded by Bob Dole
Preceded by Harry F. Byrd	Vice Chair of the Joint Taxation Committee; 1965–1981	Succeeded by Bob Dole
Preceded by Bob Dole	Ranking Member of the Senate Finance Committee; 1981–1987	Succeeded by Bob Packwood
Honorary titles
Preceded by Joseph McCarthy	Baby of the Senate; 1948–1957	Succeeded by Frank Church
Preceded by Berkeley L. Bunker	Most senior living U.S. senator (Sitting or former); January 21, 1999 – May 9, 2003	Succeeded by George Smathers
