= 1980 United States Senate election in Louisiana =

- September 13, 1980
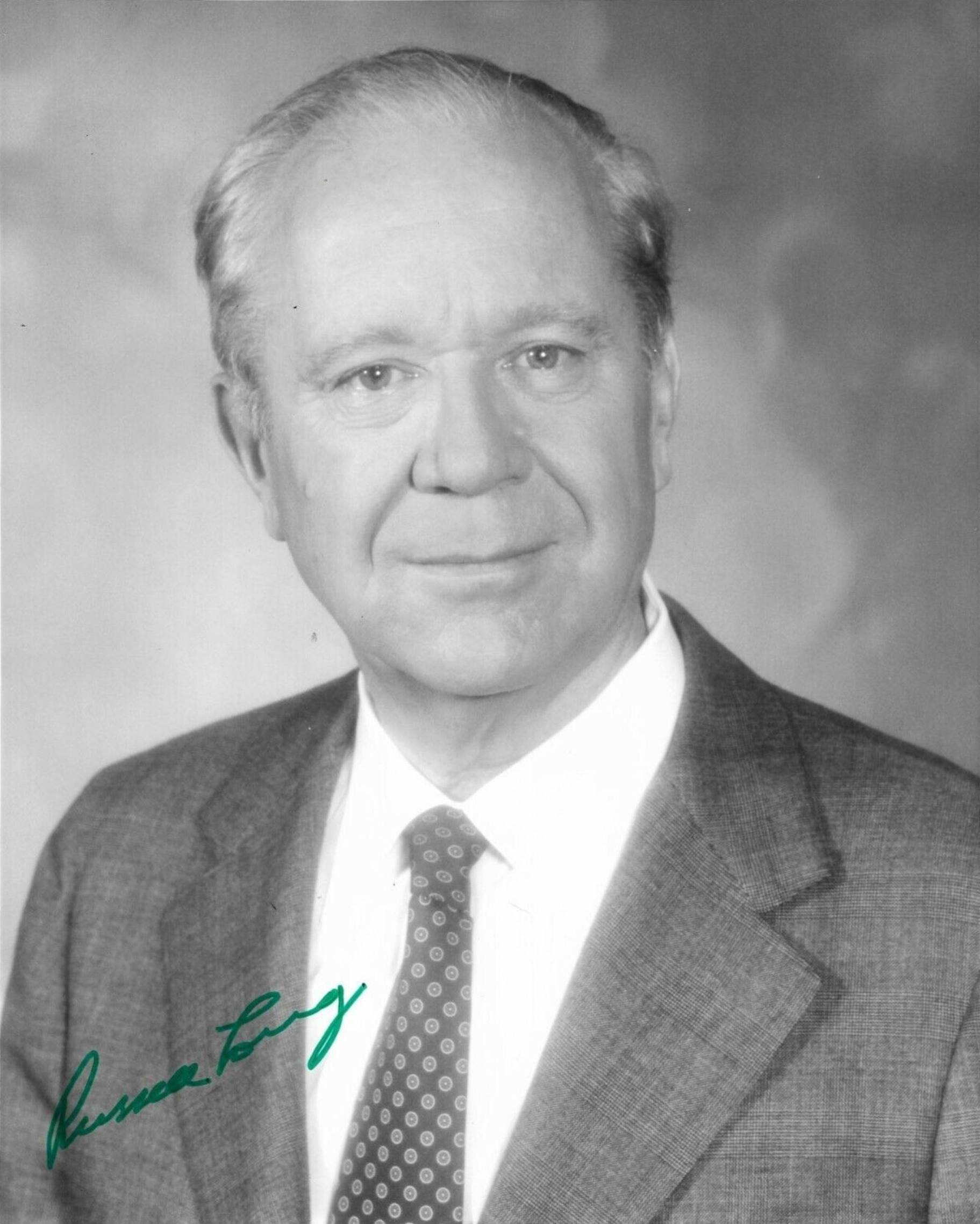

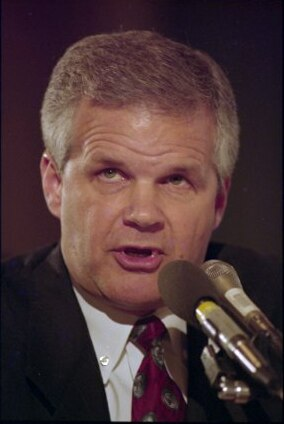
Nominee	Russell B. Long	Woody Jenkins
Party	Democratic	Democratic
Popular vote	484,770	325,992
Percentage	57.64%	38.76%
- Parish results Long: 50–60% 60–70% 70–80% Jenkins: 50–60%
U.S. senator before election
Russell B. Long
Democratic
Elected U.S. Senator
Russell B. Long
Democratic

The 1980 United States Senate election in Louisiana was held on September 13, 1980. Incumbent Democrat Russell B. Long won the primary with 57.64% of the vote and avoided a runoff.

== Primary election ==
=== Candidates ===
- Russell B. Long, incumbent United States Senator
- Woody Jenkins, State Representative
- Jerry C. Bardwell
- Robert M. Ross
- Naomi Bracey

=== Results ===
1980 United States Senate primary election in Louisiana
Party	Candidate	Votes	%
Democratic	Russell B. Long (incumbent)	484,770	57.64
Democratic	Woody Jenkins	325,992	38.76
Republican	Jerry C. Bardwell	13,739	1.63
Republican	Robert M. Ross	10,208	1.21
Independent	Naomi Bracey	6,374	0.76
Total votes		843,362	100
Democratic hold			

== See also ==
- 1980 United States Senate elections
