= 1974 United States Senate election in Louisiana =

1974 Democratic Senate primary election in Louisiana
- August 17, 1974
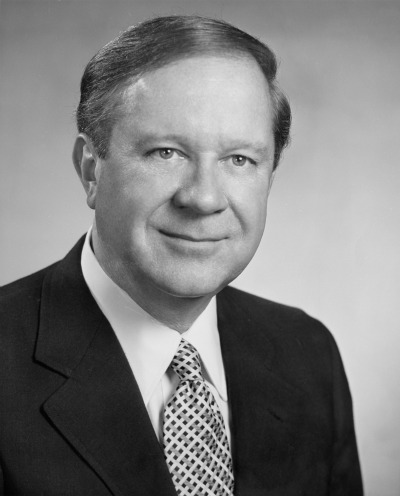

Nominee	Russell B. Long	Sherman A. Bernard	Annie Smart
Party	Democratic	Democratic	Democratic
Popular vote	520,606	131,540	44,341
Percentage	74.75%	18.89%	6.37%
- Parish results Long: 50–60% 60–70% 70–80% 80–90%
U.S. senator before election
Russell Long
Democratic
Elected U.S. Senator
Russell Long
Democratic

The 1974 United States Senate election in Louisiana was held on November 5, 1974. Incumbent Democratic Senator Russell Long was elected to a sixth term in office.

On August 17, Long won the Democratic primary with 74.75% of the vote. At this time, Louisiana was a one-party state, and the Democratic nomination was tantamount to victory. Long won the November general election without an opponent.

== Democratic primary ==
=== Candidates ===
- Sherman A. Bernard, Louisiana commissioner of insurance
- Russell Long, incumbent senator
- Annie Smart

=== Results ===
1974 United States Senate Democratic primary
Party	Candidate	Votes	%
Democratic	Russell Long (incumbent)	520,606	74.75%
Democratic	Sherman A. Bernard	131,540	18.89%
Democratic	Annie Smart	44,341	6.37%
Total votes		696,487	100.00

== General election ==
1974 United States Senate election
Party	Candidate	Votes	%	±%
Democratic	Russell Long (incumbent)	434,643	100.00%	Steady
Total votes		437,695	100.00%	
