= 1962 United States Senate election in Louisiana =

- November 6, 1962
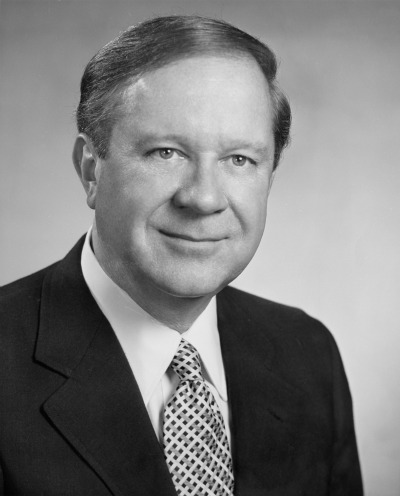

Nominee	Russell B. Long	Taylor W. O'Hearn
Party	Democratic	Republican
Popular vote	318,838	103,666
Percentage	75.46%	24.54%
- Parish results Long: 50–60% 60–70% 70–80% 80–90% >90% Maloney: 50–60% 60–70%
U.S. senator before election
Russell Long
Democratic
Elected U.S. Senator
Russell Long
Democratic

The 1962 United States Senate election in Louisiana was held on November 6, 1962. Incumbent Democratic Senator Russell Long was elected to a fourth term in office.

On August 17, Long won the Democratic primary with 80.15% of the vote.

Long won the general election against Shreveport attorney Taylor W. O'Hearn, who staged a rare bid for statewide office on the Republican line. O'Hearn carried seven parishes in northern Louisiana, a sign of growing disenchantment by conservative Southern whites with the Kennedy administration, but Long still won an easy majority in a state that remained predominantly Democratic.

== Democratic primary ==
=== Candidates ===
- Russell Long, incumbent Senator
- Philemon St. Amant, retired Lieutenant Colonel from Baton Rouge

=== Results ===
1962 United States Senate Democratic primary
Party	Candidate	Votes	%
Democratic	Russell Long (incumbent)	407,162	80.15%
Democratic	Philemon St. Amant	100,843	19.85%
Total votes		508,005	100.00%

== General election ==
=== Campaign ===
Taylor O'Hearn, a segregationist Democrat from Shreveport, Louisiana, switched parties to run as a Republican in 1962 for the U.S. Senate.

O'Hearn charged that Long was practicing "the same old pork barrel. He's promising everybody everything with their own money." He said that Long was attempting to take credit for all political progress in the state. Long refused to debate O'Hearn, who charged that the senator "doesn't have the guts to talk to the people about campaign issues." Long replied that he was "not ashamed I've fought to get things for Louisiana. I'm not ashamed to go to the White House to talk to the president to get things done for my state and its people."

O'Hearn also attacked Long for his alignment with the Kennedy administration. O'Hearn also claimed that Long voted 75 percent of the time for Kennedy policies: "These bills are not just socialistic but radical!"

O'Hearn particularly attacked Long and Kennedy on foreign policy. He called the failed Bay of Pigs operation a "desertion of Cuban patriots... It's odd to me that Russell Long and Jack Kennedy were the only two persons in the country who did not know about the Cuban arms buildup." He claimed that the Cuban blockade against Soviet missiles was "timed perfectly with the political campaign."

O'Hearn said that he opposed foreign aid until neutral countries committed themselves to the West. He proposed that the United States withdraw from the United Nations until "the communist bloc pays its share." In appealing for support, O'Hearn said that his "honor and integrity [are] the only things I own. No one is going to buy it, bargain for it, or obtain it in any other matter."

Long denied O'Hearn's contention that he was automatically in lockstep with Kennedy policies. Long distanced himself on civil rights and voiced opposition to Kennedy's intervention in the desegregation of the University of Mississippi at Oxford after rioting by whites at the campus.

In a newspaper advertisement, Long declared himself an "Independent Thinker" who is "unalterably opposed to federal control of state education, foreign aid to Russia's satellites, unnecessary federal spending, and increased taxation." He also claimed to be a "leader in the fight to preserve our traditional southern way of life." Long noted that he had managed to keep Fort Polk operating near Leesville in Vernon Parish and had fought for assistance to underprivileged children, the needy blind, small business, and farmers.

=== Results ===
1962 United States Senate election
Party	Candidate	Votes	%	±%
Democratic	Russell Long (incumbent)	318,838	75.46%	▼24.54
Republican	Taylor W. O'Hearn	103,666	24.54%	▲24.54
Total votes		422,504	100.00%	

O'Hearn carried seven conservative north Louisiana parishes. He polled a clear majority in Louisiana's 4th congressional district.

O'Hearn fared best in his native Caddo Parish, where he polled 64.7 percent of the vote. He received 58.7 percent of the vote in neighboring Madison Parish and also carried Webster, Morehouse, Bossier, Claiborne, and La Salle parishes. In ten other parishes, all in north Louisiana, O'Hearn drew more than 40 percent of the vote.
