= 1956 United States Senate election in Louisiana =

- November 6, 1956
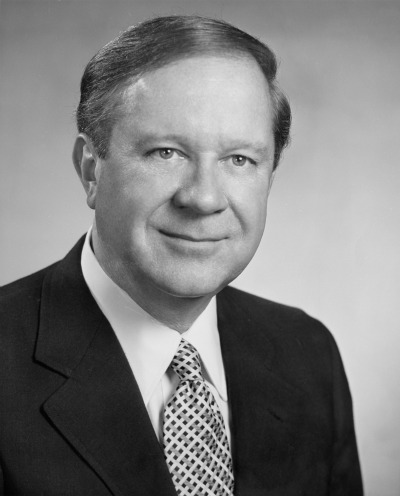
Nominee	Russell B. Long
Party	Democratic
Popular vote	335,564
Percentage	100.00%
- Parish results Long: >90%
U.S. senator before election
Russell B. Long
Democratic
Elected U.S. Senator
Russell B. Long
Democratic

The 1956 United States Senate election in Louisiana was held on November 6, 1956. Incumbent Democratic U.S. Senator Russell B. Long won re-election to a third term.

At this time, Louisiana was a one-party state. Long's victory in the July 31 primary was tantamount to election, and he was unopposed in the general election.

== Democratic primary ==
The Democratic primary was held on July 31, 1956.

=== Candidates ===
- Russell B. Long, incumbent U.S. Senator, unopposed

=== Results ===
Democratic Party primary results
Party	Candidate	Votes	%
Democratic	Russell B. Long (incumbent)	unopposed	

== General election ==
=== Results ===
1956 United States Senate election in Louisiana
Party	Candidate	Votes	%
Democratic	Russell B. Long (incumbent)	335,564	100.00%
Turnout		335,564	
Democratic hold			

== See also ==
- 1956 United States Senate elections

== Bibliography ==
- Congressional Elections, 1946-1996. Washington, D.C.: Congressional Quarterly Inc. 1998. ISBN 1-56802-248-4.
