= 1950 United States Senate election in Louisiana =

- November 7, 1950
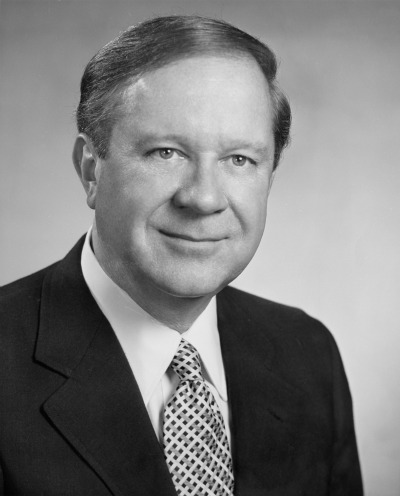

Nominee	Russell B. Long	Charles S. Gerth
Party	Democratic	Republican
Popular vote	220,907	30,931
Percentage	87.72%	12.28%
- Parish results Long: 70–80% 80–90% >90%
U.S. senator before election
Russell B. Long
Democratic
Elected U.S. Senator
Russell B. Long
Democratic

The 1950 United States Senate election in Louisiana was held on November 7, 1950. Incumbent Democratic U.S. Senator Russell B. Long won re-election to a second term.

== Democratic primary ==
The Democratic primary was held on July 25, 1950.

=== Candidates ===
- Malcolm E. LaFargue, attorney, former U.S. district attorney
- Russell B. Long, incumbent U.S. Senator
- Newt V. Mills, real estate dealer, former U.S. Representative

=== Withdrew ===
- J. Y. Fauntleroy, member of the Louisiana State University Board of Supervisors

=== Results ===
Democratic Party primary results
Party	Candidate	Votes	%
Democratic	Russell B. Long (incumbent)	359,330	68.46
Democratic	Malcolm E. LaFargue	156,918	29.90
Democratic	Newt V. Mills	8,611	1.64
Majority		202,412	38.56
Turnout		524,859	

== General election ==
=== Results ===
United States Senate election in Louisiana, 1950
Party	Candidate	Votes	%
Democratic	Russell B. Long (incumbent)	220,907	87.72%
Republican	Charles S. Gerth	30,931	12.28%
Majority		189,976	75.44%
Turnout		251,838	
Democratic hold			

== See also ==
- 1950 United States Senate elections

== Bibliography ==
- Congressional Elections, 1946-1996. Washington, D.C.: Congressional Quarterly Inc. 1998. ISBN 1-56802-248-4.
