= John H. Overton =

American politician

John Overton
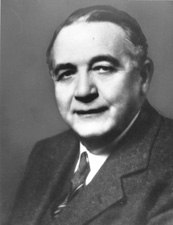

United States Senator from Louisiana
- In office March 4, 1933 – May 14, 1948
- Preceded by: Edwin S. Broussard
- Succeeded by: William C. Feazel

Member of the U.S. House of Representatives from Louisiana's 8th district
- In office May 12, 1931 – March 3, 1933
- Preceded by: James Aswell
- Succeeded by: Cleveland Dear

Personal details
- Born: John Holmes Overton Sr. September 17, 1875 Marksville, Louisiana, U.S.
- Died: May 14, 1948 (aged 72) Bethesda, Maryland, U.S.
- Resting place: Mount Olivet Cemetery
- Party: Democratic
- Spouse: Ada Dismukes
- Children: 4
- Relatives: Overton Brooks (nephew)
- Education: Louisiana State University (BA); Tulane University (LLB)

John Holmes Overton Sr. (September 17, 1875 – May 14, 1948), was an attorney and Democratic U.S. representative and U.S. senator from Louisiana. His nephew, Thomas Overton Brooks, was also a US representative, from the Shreveport-based 4th district of Louisiana.

== Family ==
He was the youngest son of Judge Thomas Overton and the former Laura Waddill. His great-uncle was General and US Representative Walter Hampden Overton. Another distant relative was Thomas Overton Moore, the governor of Louisiana during the American Civil War.

== Early life ==
Born in Marksville in Avoyelles Parish, Overton graduated in 1895 from Louisiana State University in Baton Rouge and in 1897 from Tulane University Law School in New Orleans.

In 1905, Overton married the former Ada Ruth Dismukes of Natchitoches. They had three daughters, Katharine (1910–1988), Ruth (1912–1973), and Mary Elizabeth (1916–1988), and a son, John H. Overton Jr. (1914–1946).

== Career ==
Overton was admitted to the Louisiana bar in 1898. He established a law practice with four partners in Alexandria and was the city attorney as well. He was a member of the LSU Board of Supervisors.

In 1918, Overton ran for the US Senate but was defeated by Edward J. Gay, of Plaquemine, in Iberville Parish, near Baton Rouge.

Overton became a staunch supporter of Huey Long and served as Long's counsel in the impeachment proceedings against the governor in the spring of 1929.

I've supported every governor that has been elected in Louisiana for twenty-five years, all on promises that they have made to the people. Not one of them has been able or, if able, willing to carry out what was expected of him. The present governor is throwing out of office the clique that all other governors promised to throw out. He is backed to the wall in his efforts to redeem his campaign pledges.

In 1931, Overton was elected to fill the now-defunct Louisiana's 8th congressional district seat in the United States House of Representatives, which had been vacated by the death of Representative James B. Aswell, of Natchitoches. Overton served in the House for less than a term: from May 12, 1931, to March 4, 1933.

In 1932, Overton unseated the two-term US Senator Edwin S. Broussard, of New Iberia, for the Democratic nomination, then equivalent to election in Louisiana. Overton was warmly endorsed by Long, who then became his Senate colleague. Six years earlier, Long had helped Broussard turn back a challenge from a conservative former governor, Jared Y. Sanders Sr., but the two had long since parted political alliances. In his autobiography, Every Man a King, Long notes that Overton won all sixty-four parishes against Broussard, including the incumbent's own Iberia Parish. Long said that Overton had "always been very kind to me. [He] let me speak in his meetings every time he ran for the Senate."

Despite his lopsided loss, Broussard alleged fraud and voter irregularities. A Senate investigating committee held months of hearings beginning in February 1933, but Overton was nevertheless seated without opposition on March 4, the first day of the congressional session. As a senator, Overton generally voted with the Conservative Coalition of Midwestern Republicans and Southern Democrats, much like Broussard.

Overton was re-elected in 1938 and 1944, as has been traditional with incumbent Democratic senators in Louisiana. His committee memberships included Appropriations, Manufactures, Commerce, and Irrigation and Reclamation. His chief area of interest was in flood control and river and harbor development.

Overton attempted to withdraw from re-election race in 1944. However, his Louisiana colleague, Allen J. Ellender, circulated a letter urging him to run. The letter was signed by all of the Senate Democrats.

== Death and legacy ==
Overton's last term was cut short by his death at National Naval Medical Center in Bethesda, Maryland. His remains were buried at Mount Olivet Cemetery in Pineville in Rapides Parish. In 1985, his house in Alexandria was added to the National Register of Historic Places. It was at 1128 8th Street. In 1998, Overton was posthumously inducted into the Louisiana Political Museum and Hall of Fame in Winnfield.

== See also ==
- List of members of the United States Congress who died in office (1900–1949)
- List of United States senators expelled or censured

== Sources ==
- "John Holmes Overton" A Dictionary of Louisiana Biography, Vol. II (1988), p. 623
- United States Congress. "John H. Overton (id: O000146)". Biographical Directory of the United States Congress.
- Alexandria Daily Town Talk, May 17, 1948
- Alcee Fortier, Louisiana (1909)
- T. Harry Williams, Huey Long (1969)
- New Orleans Times-Picayune, February 26, 1933; November 5, 1944
- Winnfield, La - Old L&A Depot, LA Political Museum at www.cityofwinnfield.com
- Biographical Directory of the American Congress: 1774-1971, p. 1500.

Party political offices
Preceded by Edwin S. Broussard	Democratic nominee for U.S. Senator from Louisiana (Class 3); 1932, 1938, 1944	Succeeded by Russell B. Long
U.S. House of Representatives
Preceded by James Aswell	Member of the U.S. House of Representatives from Louisiana's 8th congressional district 1931–1933	Succeeded by Cleveland Dear
U.S. Senate
Preceded by Edwin S. Broussard	U.S. Senator (Class 3) from Louisiana; 1933–1948; Served alongside: Huey Long, Rose McConnell Long, Allen J. Ellender	Succeeded by William C. Feazel
