= Kerry Pourciau =

American civil servant

- Born: September 4, 1951
- Died: October 21, 1994 (aged 43); Baton Rouge, Louisiana, U.S.
- Resting place: Roselawn Memorial Park
- Education: Louisiana State University
- Occupations: political campaign advisor civil servant development director
- Political party: Democrat
- Spouse: Loretta Ann Honoré

Kerry Louis Pourciau (September 4, 1951 – October 21, 1994) was an American civil servant and city official. In 1972, he became the first African-American president of the Student Government Association at Louisiana State University. Pourciau held positions in the offices of U.S. Senator Russell Long and New Orleans Mayor Ernest N. Morial. He later served as the economic development director for Baton Rouge and worked in public relations for Gulf States Utilities and the Louisiana Lottery Corporation.

== Early life and education ==
Pourciau is of mixed racial heritage through both of his parents. He grew up in a religious family.

Pourciau attended Louisiana State University. In 1972, he was elected president of the university's Student Government Association, becoming the first African-American president. While a student at LSU, he was a member of the Harambe black student union.

== Career ==
Pourciau was active in the Louisiana Democratic Party and held positions in the offices of U.S. Senator Russell Long and Ernest N. Morial, the Mayor of New Orleans. He worked on Morial's successful mayoral campaign.

He later served as the economic development director for the City of Baton Rouge and worked in public relations for Gulf States Utilities and the Louisiana Lottery Corporation.

Pourciau supported Bill Clinton during the 1992 United States presidential election.

== Personal life, death, and legacy ==
He was married to Loretta Ann Honoré. Their son, John Daniel Pourciau, served as chief of staff for New Orleans Mayor LaToya Cantrell.

Pourciau died in 1994. He was buried at Roselawn Memorial Park and Mausoleum in Baton Rouge. A 1993 interview with Pourciau and Kerry Louis, done by Maxine Crump, is housed in the T. Harry Williams Center for Oral History at Louisiana State University Libraries Special Collections.
