= 1930 United States Senate election in Louisiana =

1930 Democratic Senate primary election in Louisiana
- September 9, 1930
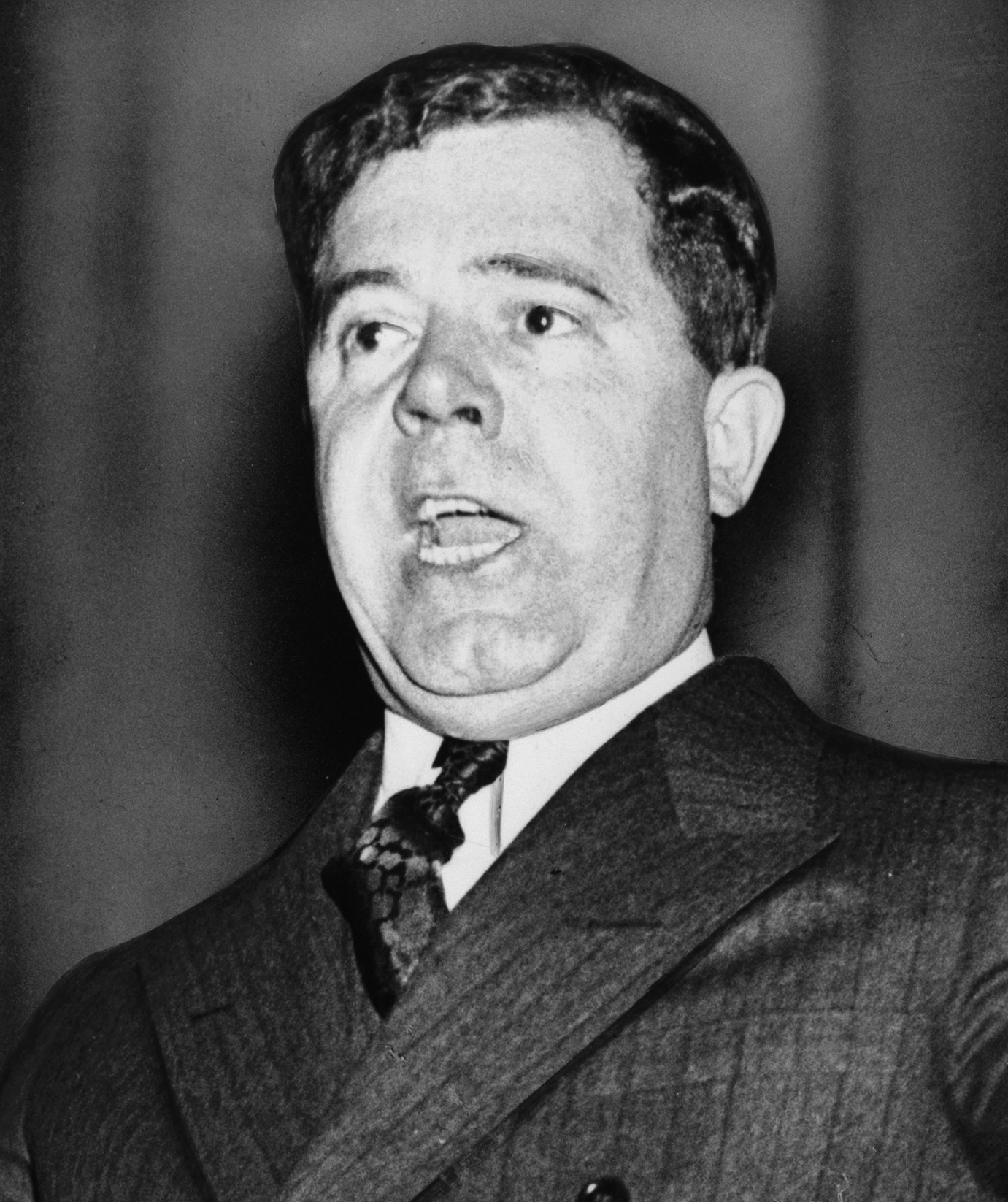

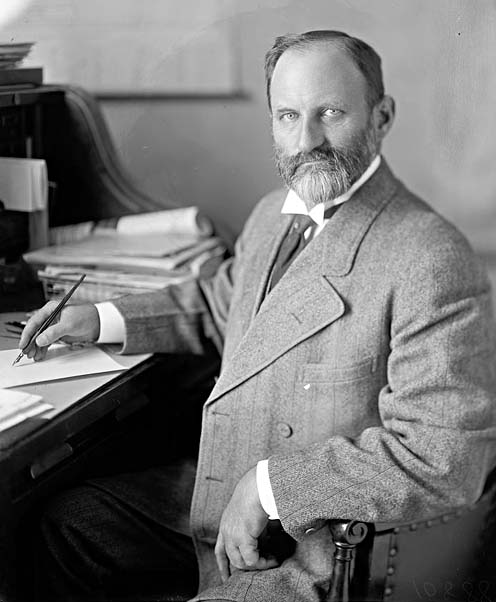
Nominee	Huey Long	Joseph Ransdell
Party	Democratic	Democratic
Popular vote	149,640	111,451
Percentage	57.31%	42.69%
Parish Results
Long
50–60%
60–70%
70–80%
80–90%
90–100%
Ransdell
50–60%
60–70%
70–80%
80–90%
U.S. senator before election
Joseph E. Ransdell
Democratic
Elected U.S. Senator
Huey Long
Democratic

The 1930 United States Senate election in Louisiana was held on November 4, 1930.

On September 9, Governor of Louisiana Huey Long defeated incumbent Senator Joseph E. Ransdell in the Democratic primary with 57.31% of the vote.

At this time, Louisiana was a one-party state, and the Democratic nomination was tantamount to victory. Long won the November general election without an opponent.

== Democratic primary ==
=== Campaign ===
The incumbent governor of Louisiana, Huey Long, decided to challenge the incumbent senator Ransdell as a referendum on his program in the state. Huey ran with the support of his own machine while the new regulars merged with the old regulars to support Ransdell.

=== Candidates ===
- Huey Long, Governor of Louisiana
- Joseph E. Ransdell, incumbent Senator

=== Results ===
1930 United States Senate Democratic primary
Party	Candidate	Votes	%
Democratic	Huey Long	149,640	57.31%
Democratic	Joseph E. Ransdell (incumbent)	111,451	42.69%
Total votes		261,091	100.00%

== General election ==
1930 United States Senate election
Party	Candidate	Votes	%	±%
Democratic	Huey Long	130,536	99.98%	▼0.02
Write-in	All others	24	0.02%	▲0.02
Total votes		130,560	100.00%	
