= Hills and Dales =

Hills and Dales may refer to:

- Hills and Dales, Kentucky
- Hills and Dales, Ohio
- Hills and Dales, Tennessee
- Holaday Hills and Dales, a neighborhood of Carmel, Indiana
- Hill 'n Dale, Florida
- Hill N Dale, Lexington
- Hills and Dales Estate

== See also ==
- Hill and dale
