= Senator Fawell =

Senator Fawell may refer to:

- Beverly Fawell (1930–2013), Illinois State Senate
- Harris Fawell (born 1929), Illinois State Senate

== See also ==
- Senator Farwell (disambiguation)
