= Gary Hart =

American politician (born 1936)

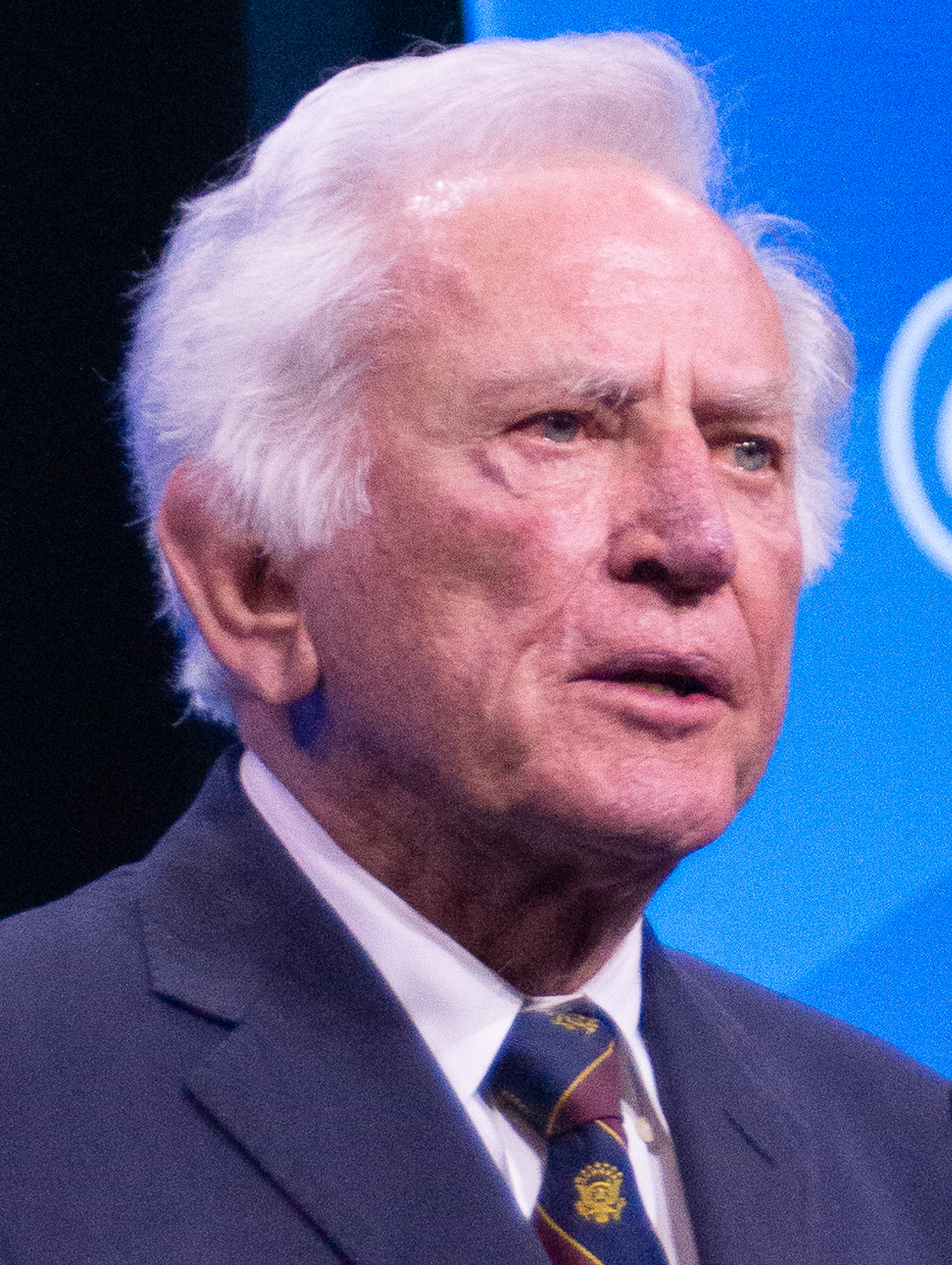
- Hart in 2019

United States Special Envoy for Northern Ireland
- In office October 21, 2014 – January 20, 2017
- President: Barack Obama
- Preceded by: Declan Kelly (2011)
- Succeeded by: Mick Mulvaney (2020)

Vice Chair of the Homeland Security Advisory Council
- In office June 5, 2009 – February 8, 2011
- President: Barack Obama
- Preceded by: James Schlesinger
- Succeeded by: Bill Bratton

United States Senator from Colorado
- In office January 3, 1975 – January 3, 1987
- Preceded by: Peter Dominick
- Succeeded by: Tim Wirth

Personal details
- Born: Gary Warren Hartpence; November 28, 1936 (age 89) Ottawa, Kansas, U.S.
- Party: Democratic
- Spouse: Lee Ludwig (m. 1958; died 2021)
- Children: 2
- Relatives: Martha Keys (sister-in-law)
- Education: Southern Nazarene University (BA); Yale University (BDiv, LLB); St Antony's College, Oxford (DPhil)

Military service
- Allegiance: United States
- Branch: United States Navy
- Service years: 1980–unknown
- Rank: Lieutenant
- Unit: United States Navy Reserve; Navy Judge Advocate General's Corps

Gary Warren Hart (né Hartpence; November 28, 1936) is an American politician, diplomat, and lawyer. In 1984, he ran for the Democratic presidential nomination, finishing as the runner-up to Walter Mondale; he ran again for the nomination in 1988, and was initially considered the front-runner, but eventually dropped out amid revelations of extramarital affairs. He represented Colorado in the United States Senate from 1975 to 1987.

Born in Ottawa, Kansas, Hart pursued a legal career in Denver, Colorado, after graduating from Yale Law School. He managed Senator George McGovern's successful campaign for the 1972 Democratic presidential nomination and McGovern's unsuccessful general election campaign against President Richard Nixon. Hart defeated incumbent Republican Senator Peter Dominick in Colorado's 1974 Senate election. In the Senate, he served on the Church Committee and led the Senate investigation regarding the Three Mile Island accident. After narrowly winning re-election in 1980, he sponsored the Semiconductor Chip Protection Act of 1984, becoming known as an "Atari Democrat".

Hart sought the Democratic presidential nomination in 1984, narrowly losing the race to former Vice President Walter Mondale. Hart declined to seek re-election to the Senate in 1986 and sought the Democratic presidential nomination in 1988. He was widely viewed as the front-runner until reports surfaced of an extramarital affair, and Hart withdrew from the race in May 1987. He re-entered the race in December 1987 but withdrew from the race again after faring poorly in the early primaries. The nomination ultimately went to Michael Dukakis.

Hart returned to private practice after the 1988 election and served in a variety of public roles. He co-chaired the Hart-Rudman Task Force on Homeland Security, served on the Homeland Security Advisory Council, and was the United States Special Envoy for Northern Ireland. He earned a doctorate in politics from the University of Oxford and has written for outlets such as The Huffington Post. He has also written several books, including a biography of President James Monroe. Hart married Lee Ludwig in 1958, who died at age 85 on April 9, 2021. They had two children, John and Andrea Hart.

== Early life and education ==
Gary Warren Hart was born Gary Warren Hartpence on November 28, 1936, in Ottawa, Kansas, the son of Nina (née Pritchard) and Carl Riley Hartpence, a farm equipment salesman. As a young man, he worked as a laborer on the railroad. He and his father changed their last name to "Hart" in 1961 because "Hart is a lot easier to remember than Hartpence." Raised in the Church of the Nazarene (which he ultimately left in 1968), he won a scholarship to the church-affiliated Bethany Nazarene College in Bethany, Oklahoma, in 1954 and graduated with a B.A. in philosophy in 1958. He met his wife, Oletha "Lee" Ludwig, there, and they married in 1958. Initially intending to enter the Nazarene ministry, he received a B.D. from Yale Divinity School in 1961 before receiving an LL.B. from Yale Law School in 1964.

== Career ==
=== Early legal work ===
Hart became an attorney for the United States Department of Justice from 1964 to 1965 and was admitted to the Colorado and District of Columbia bars in 1965. He was special assistant to the solicitor of the United States Department of the Interior from 1965 to 1967. He then entered private law practice in Denver, Colorado, at the firm of Davis Graham & Stubbs.

=== George McGovern's 1972 presidential campaign ===
Following the 1968 Democratic National Convention in Chicago, U.S. Senator George McGovern of South Dakota co-chaired a commission that revised the Democratic presidential nomination structure. The new structure weakened the influence of such old-style party bosses as Chicago Mayor Richard J. Daley, who were once able to hand-pick national convention delegates and dictate the way they voted. The new rules made caucuses a process in which relative newcomers could participate without paying dues to established party organizations.

In the 1972 primary elections, McGovern named Hart his national campaign director. Along with Rick Stearns, an expert on the new system, they decided on a strategy to focus on the 28 states holding caucuses instead of primary elections. They felt the nature of the caucuses made them easier and less costly to win if they targeted their efforts. While their primary election strategy proved successful in winning the nomination, McGovern went on to lose the 1972 presidential election in one of the most lopsided elections in U.S. history.

=== United States Senator ===
In 1974, Hart ran for the United States Senate, challenging two-term incumbent Republican Peter Dominick. Hart was aided by Colorado's trend toward Democrats during the early 1970s, as well as Dominick's continued support for the unpopular President Richard Nixon and concerns about the senator's health. In the general election, Hart won by a wide margin (57.2% to Dominick's 39.5%) and was immediately labeled a rising star. He got a seat on the Armed Services Committee and was an early supporter of reforming the bidding for military contracts, as well as an advocate for the military using smaller, more mobile weapons and equipment, as opposed to the traditional large-scale items. He also served on the Environment and Public Work Committee and the Senate Intelligence Committee. From 1975 to 1976, Hart was a member of the post-Watergate Church Committee that investigated abuses by the Central Intelligence Agency, National Security Agency, Federal Bureau of Investigation, and Internal Revenue Service. Hart served as the chairman of Senate Subcommittee on Nuclear Regulation. He flew over the Three Mile Island nuclear reactor near Harrisburg, Pennsylvania, in an Army helicopter several times with fellow Senator Alan Simpson during the nuclear accident and led the subsequent Senate investigation into the incident.

In 1980, Hart sought a second term. In something of a surprise, his Republican opponent was Colorado Secretary of State Mary Estill Buchanan, a moderate candidate who narrowly defeated the more conservative choice, Howard "Bo" Callaway, in the party primary, by fewer than 2,000 primary votes. Fourteen years earlier, Callaway was the Republican gubernatorial nominee in his native Georgia. Callaway in the early 1970s had bought and run an elegant resort in Crested Butte. Buchanan hit Hart hard for supporting the Panama Canal Treaties and for backing then-President Jimmy Carter in 80% of his Senate votes. Buchanan charged in a campaign ad about Hart: "He votes one way and talks another when he is back here. He is a liberal, McGovernite carpetbagger." Hart responded that Buchanan's charges reflected her narrow viewpoint and insisted that his campaign would rise above partisanship. Said Hart in a campaign ad: "I will not ignore her. We will interact and debate, but I am going to run a campaign for the 1980s. What is her plan for the environment? For national defense? For the economy? It took me a year or so to formulate my ideas." In the end, Hart won narrowly, with 50.2% of the vote to his opponent's 48.7%.

On December 2, 1981, Hart was one of only four senators to vote against an amendment to President Reagan's MX missiles proposal that would divert the silo system by $334 million as well as earmark further research for other methods that would allow giant missiles to be based. The vote was seen as a rebuff of the Reagan administration. Hart cosponsored the Semiconductor Chip Protection Act of 1984 with Senator Charles Mathias, which was signed into law. The act created a new category of intellectual property rights that makes the layouts of integrated circuits legally protected upon registration, and hence illegal to copy without permission. This protected Silicon Valley chips from cheap foreign imitations. Similar legislation had been proposed in every Congress since 1979. It led to Hart being called the leader of the "Atari Democrats". Conservative Republican Senator Barry Goldwater remarked of Hart, "You can disagree with him politically, but I have never met a man who is more honest and more moral." Like most of the Democratic party, Hart supported abortion rights.

=== United States Naval Reserve service ===
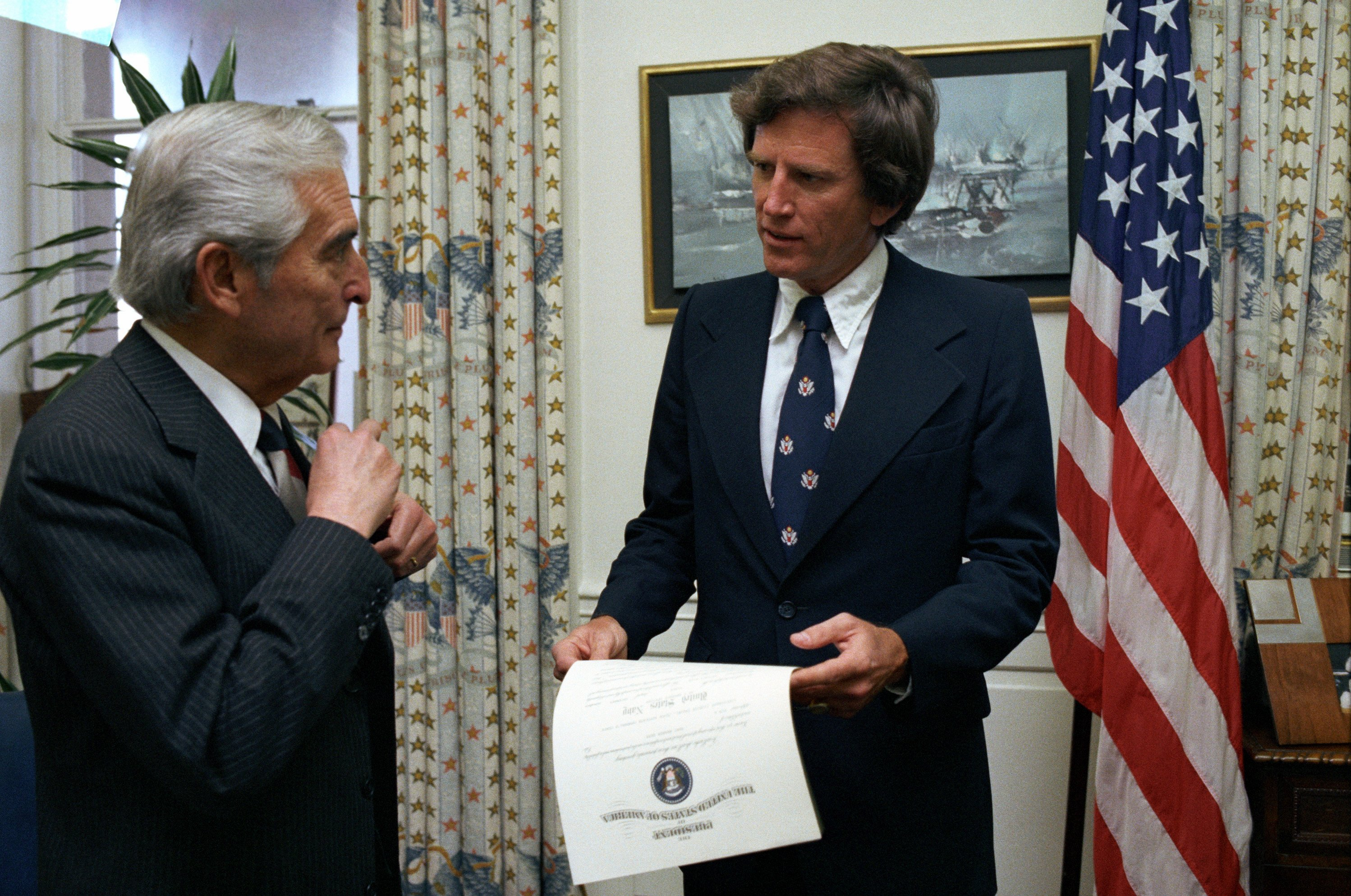
Hart accepting his US Naval Reserve commission from Secretary of the Navy Edward Hidalgo, December 4, 1980

Citing the increasing likelihood of an armed conflict in the Persian Gulf and his reluctance to "stay in the Senate and authorize and appropriate funds to send young men like my son off to fight that war," Hart applied for a commission in the United States Naval Reserve's Standby Reserve Active Status List program in the late 1970s. He was over the statutory age limit of 38 and had not amassed any prior military experience; moreover, in contrast to his stated rationale, this category "would not be called up immediately in the event of a mobilization." By mutual agreement, Hart and United States Secretary of the Navy Edward Hidalgo deferred the consideration of the request until the aftermath of the 1980 election. His application contained an incorrect birth date (November 28, 1937) that he had used inconsistently on official documents for 15 years.

Following his reelection, Hart received an age waiver from Hidalgo and was commissioned as a lieutenant (junior grade) in the Judge Advocate General's Corps on December 4, 1980. The commission carried "no pay or allowances." Although Hart sought to be commissioned in the grades of lieutenant commander or commander (in keeping with contemporaries in Congress who had served in World War II and the Korean War), Navy Judge Advocate General John S. Jenkins advised Hidalgo to commission Hart at the lower rank because he "didn't bring to the program anything that was so unusual that we could recommend appointment at a higher grade." However, then-U.S. Navy Senate liaison officer John McCain (who cultivated a close friendship with Hart in that capacity, presaging his own political career) maintained in a 1984 interview that a field officer appointment would have been "appropriate." Following ten days of active duty with the United States Sixth Fleet in August 1981, Hart was promoted to lieutenant on January 1, 1982. Pundits such as Rowland Evans and Robert Novak suggested that Hart's appointment was a cynical political maneuver designed to "clear the biographical decks" for the 1984 presidential election in an era when military service was perceived as a tacit prerequisite for the presidency.

In a 2007 commentary for HuffPost, Hart asserted that his desire to "understand and communicate better with our troops" was the primary motivation for his appointment. Although he "did not routinely fulfill [his] reserve duties" and "chose not to feature this experience in subsequent campaigns", he maintained that his service "helped [him] enormously in appreciating what our military does to make us more secure."

=== 1984 presidential campaign ===
Campaign logo

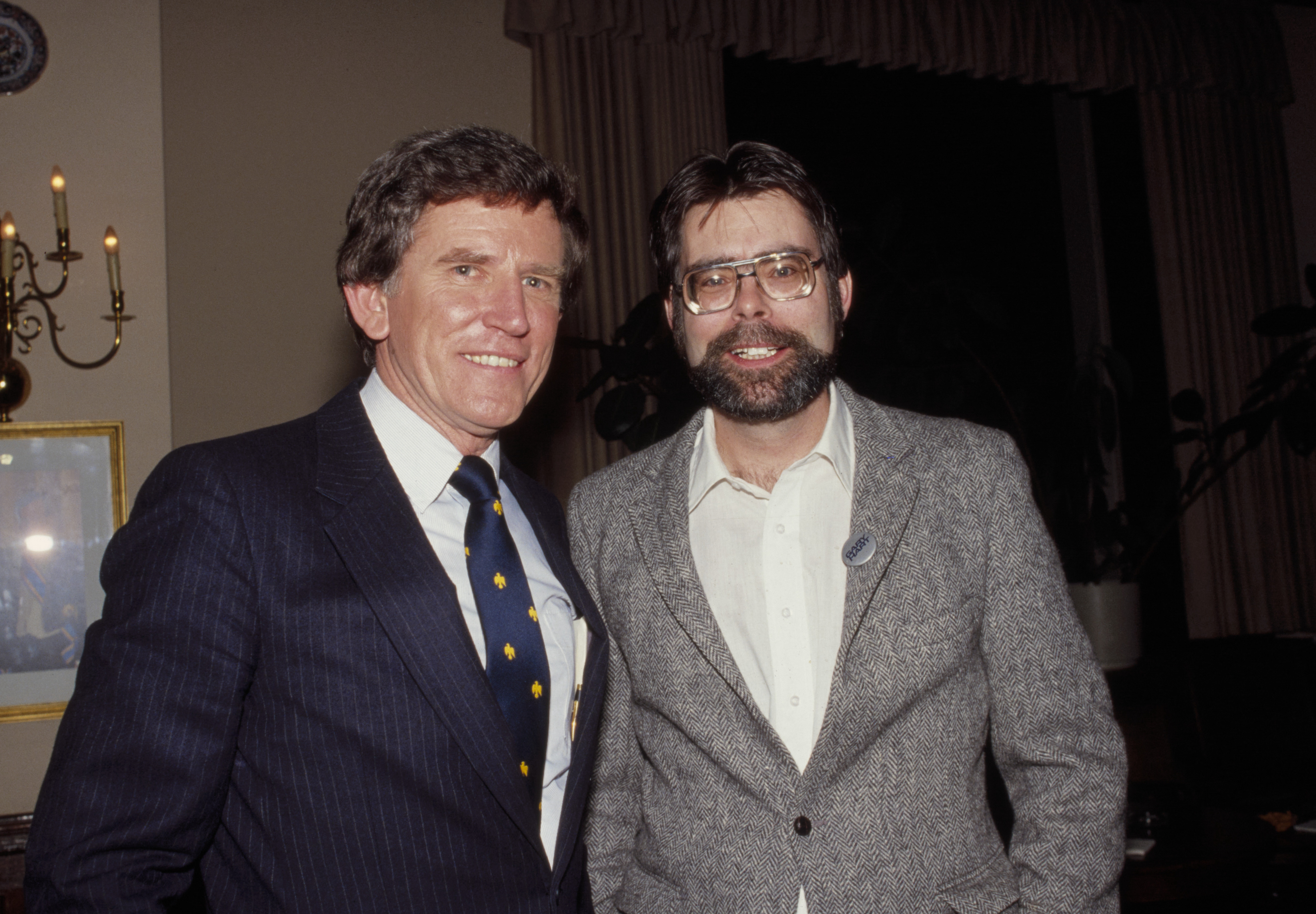
Hart with author Stephen King, who was campaigning in support of Gary Hart's 1984 candidacy

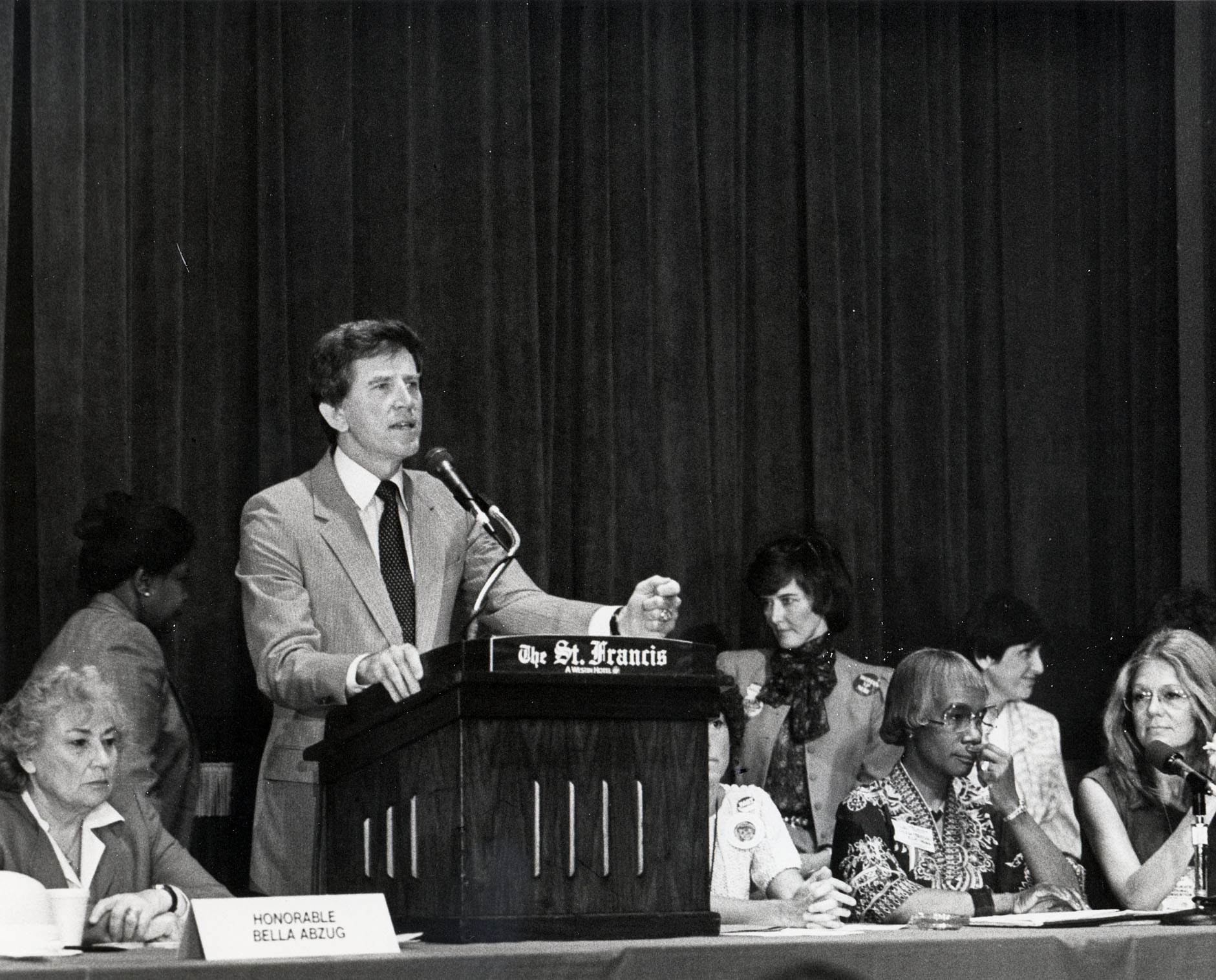
Hart at a meeting during the Democratic National Convention in 1984

By mid-1982, Hart was viewed as a prospective contender for the 1984 Democratic presidential nomination. Like most other prospective candidates, he spoke at the 1982 Democratic Midterm Conference.

In February 1983, during his second term, Hart announced his candidacy for president in the 1984 presidential election. Although he had cultivated longstanding friendships with prominent actors and journalists (including Warren Beatty, Jack Nicholson, Penny Marshall and Hunter S. Thompson) as a byproduct of his work on the McGovern campaign, Hart was little known to the general electorate and barely received above 1 percent in the polls in a competitive field that encompassed such recognizable candidates as former Vice President Walter Mondale, Project Mercury astronaut John Glenn, civil rights activist Jesse Jackson, and even his old boss, former Senator George McGovern. To counter this situation, Hart started campaigning early in New Hampshire, making a then-unprecedented canvassing tour in late September, months before the primary. This strategy attracted national media attention to his campaign, and by late 1983, he had risen moderately in the polls to the middle of the field, mostly at the expense of the sinking candidacies of Glenn and Alan Cranston. Mondale won the Iowa caucus in late January, but Hart polled a respectable 16 percent. Two weeks later, in the New Hampshire primary, he shocked much of the party establishment and the media by defeating Mondale by 10 percentage points. Hart instantly became the main challenger to Mondale for the nomination and appeared to have the momentum on his side.

Hart's media campaign was produced by Raymond Strother, a native Texan who had begun his career in Louisiana. Hart could not overcome Mondale's financial and organizational advantages, especially among labor union leaders in the Midwest and industrial Northeast. Hart's campaign was chronically in debt, to a final count of $4.75 million. In states like Illinois, where delegates were elected directly by primary voters, Hart often had incomplete delegate slates. Hart's ideas were criticized as too vague and centrist by many Democrats. Shortly after he became the new frontrunner, it was revealed that Hart had changed his last name, had often listed 1937 instead of 1936 as his birth date and had changed his signature several times. This, along with two separations from his wife (1979 and 1981), Lee, caused some to question Hart's "flake factor." Hart himself admitted in an interview that he was going through a midlife crisis and focused too much on his career, neglecting his family. Reporters observed that the Harts appeared distant and distracted in public. Hart was also not close to his children, often leaving his wife to raise them completely alone. He and his wife briefly dated each other casually during their second separation, which occurred for a few months in 1981. Additionally, the Harts had begun divorce proceedings but had stopped them after reconciling. Hart and his wife later stated that the separations, caused by too much time spent apart due to politics, only strengthened their marriage. The Harts would remain married until Lee's death on April 10, 2021.

The two men swapped victories in the primaries, with Hart getting exposure as a candidate with "new ideas" and Mondale rallying the party establishment to his side. The two men fought to a draw in the Super Tuesday, with Hart winning states in the West, Florida and New England. Mondale fought back and began ridiculing Hart's campaign platform. The most famous television moment of the campaign was during a debate when he mocked Hart's "new ideas" by quoting a line from a popular Wendy's television commercial at the time: "Where's the beef?" Hart's campaign could not effectively counter this remark, and when he ran negative TV commercials against Mondale in the Illinois primary, his appeal as a new kind of Democrat never entirely recovered. Hart lost the New York and Pennsylvania primaries, but won those of Ohio and Indiana.

Mondale gradually pulled away from Hart in the delegate count, but the race was not decided until June, on "Super Tuesday III". Decided that day were delegates from five states: South Dakota, New Mexico, West Virginia, California and New Jersey. The proportional nature of delegate selection meant that Mondale was likely to obtain enough delegates on that day to secure the stated support of an overall majority of delegates, and hence the nomination, no matter who actually "won" the states contested. However, Hart maintained that unpledged superdelegates that had previously claimed support for Mondale would shift to his side if he swept the Super Tuesday III primary. Once again, Hart committed a faux pas, insulting New Jersey shortly before the primary day. Campaigning in California, he remarked that while the "bad news" was that he and his wife had to campaign separately, "[T]he good news for her is that she campaigns in California while I campaign in New Jersey." Compounding the problem, when his wife interjected that she "got to hold a koala bear", Hart replied that "I won't tell you what I got to hold: samples from a toxic waste dump." While Hart won California, he lost New Jersey after leading in polls by as much as 15 points.

By the time the final primaries concluded, Mondale had a considerable lead in total delegates, though he was 40 delegates short of clinching victory. Superdelegates voted overwhelmingly for Mondale at the Democratic National Convention in San Francisco on July 16, making him the presidential nominee. Hart, already aware that the nomination was all but Mondale's after the final primaries, lobbied for the vice presidential slot on the ticket, claiming that he would do better than Mondale against President Ronald Reagan (an argument undercut by a June 1984 Gallup poll that showed both men nine points behind the president). While Hart was given serious consideration, Mondale chose Geraldine Ferraro instead. In his address to the convention, after his name was placed in nomination for president by Nebraska governor Bob Kerrey and he received a 15-minute standing ovation, Hart concluded, "Our party and our country will continue to hear from us. This is one Hart you will not leave in San Francisco."

This race for the nomination was the most recent occasion that a major party presidential nomination has gone all the way to the convention. Mondale was later defeated in a landslide by the incumbent Reagan, winning only his home state of Minnesota and the District of Columbia. Many felt that Hart and other similar candidates, younger and more independent-minded, represented the future of the party. Hart had refused to take money from Political Action Committees (PACs), and as a result he mortgaged his house to self-finance his campaign, and was more than $1 million in debt at the end of the campaign.

=== 1988 presidential campaign ===
Campaign logo

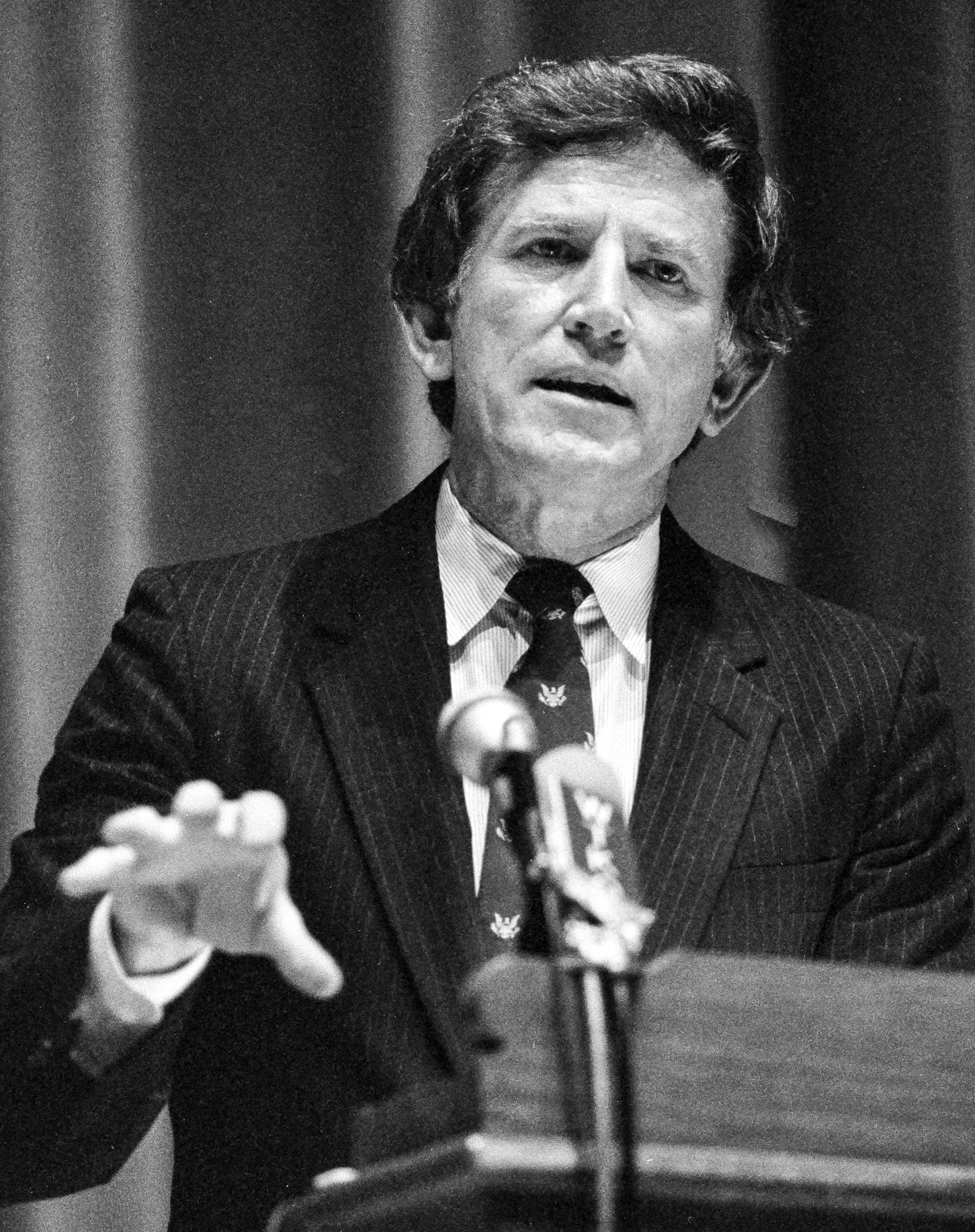
Hart speaks at Cornell University in late 1987.

Hart declined to run for re-election to the Senate, leaving office when his second term expired with the intent of running for president again. On December 20, 1986, Hart was allegedly followed by an anonymous private investigator from a radio station where he had given the Democratic Party's response to President Reagan's weekly radio address. That alleged investigator report claimed that Hart had been followed to a woman's house, photographed there, and left sometime the following morning. This allegation would ultimately cause him to suspend his planned presidential campaign. After Mario Cuomo announced in February 1987 that he would not enter the race, Hart was the clear frontrunner for the Democratic nomination in the 1988 election.

Hart officially declared his candidacy on April 13, 1987. When Lois Romano, a reporter for The Washington Post, asked Hart to respond to rumors spread by other campaigns that he was a "womanizer", Hart said such candidates were "not going to win that way, because you don't get to the top by tearing someone else down." The New York Post reported that comment on its front page with the headline lead in "Straight from the Hart", followed below with big, black block letters: "Gary: 'I'm No Womanizer.'", and then a summary of the story: "Dem blasts rivals over sex life rumors".

In late April 1987, the Miami Herald claimed that an anonymous informant (Note: Dana Weems, who at the time the call was made, was a recent acquaintance of Donna Rice, stated in a 2014 article that she had been the caller. Weems also "repeatedly insisted" that she had contacted the Herald only after reading Hart's "follow me around" quote, which was, in fact, only printed by The New York Times Magazine on the same day as the Herald's story about Rice's visit to Hart's townhouse. She had denied being the caller at the time, when it was noted that Weems was not a registered voter, and did not match the description of being a "liberal Democrat", as the Herald reported. In addition to Weems, Rice noted that she had told only two other people about the trip to Washington, D.C., Lynn Armandt, who had accompanied her on the yacht Monkey Business, and model Julie Semones, who had accompanied Rice on a visit to meet Adnan Khashoggi on his yacht.) contacted the paper to relate that Hart was having an affair with a friend, claimed it was the equivalent of the Iran-Contra scandal, provided details about the affair, and told the Herald that Hart was going to meet this person at his Washington, D.C., townhouse on May 1, a Friday. As a result, a team of Herald reporters followed Donna Rice on a flight from Miami to Washington, D.C., then staked out Hart's townhouse that evening and the following day, and observed a young woman and Hart together. The Herald reporters confronted Hart on Saturday evening in an alley about his relationship with Rice. Hart replied, "I'm not involved in any relationship," and alleged that he had been set up. (Note: Hart has never seen Rice since she left that night; they spoke in one phone call in 1998.)

The Herald published a story on May 3 that Hart had spent Friday night and most of Saturday with a young woman in his Washington, D.C. townhouse. On that same day, in an interview with E. J. Dionne that appeared in The New York Times, Hart, responding to the rumors of his womanizing, said: "Follow me around. I don't care. I'm serious. If anybody wants to put a tail on me, go ahead. They'll be very bored." At some point, the reporters for the Herald learned that The New York Times was planning to feature the quote in their article on Sunday. When the two articles appeared on the same day, a political firestorm was ignited. On Sunday, Hart's campaign denied any scandal and condemned the Herald's reporters for intrusive reporting. Hart later noted that his "follow me around" comment was not "challenging the press with a taunt", but, made in frustration, was only intended to invite the media to observe his public behavior, and never intended to invite reporters to be "skulking around in the shadows" of his home. "'He did not think of it as a challenge,' Dionne would recall many years later. 'And at the time, I did not think of it as a challenge.'" Nor did Hart's comment influence the Miami Herald to pursue the story.

The next day, Monday, the young woman was identified as Donna Rice, and she gave a press conference also denying any sexual relationship with Hart. Hart insisted that his interest in Rice was limited to her working as a campaign aide. However, as a New York Times article put it, "the facts floated on a sea of innuendo." The scandal spread rapidly through the national media, as did another damaging story about angry creditors of the $1.3 million debt Hart had incurred in his 1984 campaign. Media questions about the affair came to dominate coverage of Hart's campaign, but his staff believed that voters were not as interested in the topic as the media was. Hart's staff believed that the media was filtering his message. A Gallup Poll conducted that week for Newsweek (but published the following week) found that 55% of Democrats believed that Hart had been truthful, and 44% of them were unconcerned about the issue. The polling of all voters was even more favorable to Hart. Nearly two-thirds (64 percent) of the respondents it surveyed thought the media treatment of Hart was "unfair", and 70% disapproved of covert surveillance by the media. A little over half (53%) responded that marital infidelity had little to do with a president's ability to govern. Time magazine had similar results: of those polled, 67% disapproved of the media writing about a candidate's sex life, and 60% stated that Hart's relationship with Rice was irrelevant to the presidency. When queried about the matter, Mario Cuomo remarked that there were "skeletons in everybody's closet."

On May 8, 1987, a week after the story broke, Hart suspended his campaign after The Washington Post threatened to run a story about a woman Hart had dated while separated from his wife, and his wife and daughter became similar subjects of interest for tabloid journalists. At a press conference, Hart defiantly stated, "I said that I bend, but I don't break, and believe me, I'm not broken." Hart identified the invasive media coverage, and its need to "dissect" him, as his reason for suspending his campaign, "If someone's able to throw up a smokescreen and keep it up there long enough, you can't get your message across. You can't raise the money to finance a campaign; there's too much static, and you can't communicate. Clearly, under the present circumstances, this campaign cannot go on. I refuse to submit my family and my friends and innocent people and myself to further rumors and gossip. It's simply an intolerable situation." Hart paraphrased Thomas Jefferson and warned, "I tremble for my country when I think we may, in fact, get the kind of leaders we deserve." Hart later recalled, "I watched journalists become animals, literally."

The New York Times opined that some compared Hart's press conference to Richard Nixon's "Last Press Conference" of November 7, 1962, in which Nixon blamed the media for his loss in the 1962 California gubernatorial election and did not take responsibility for his own actions. Hart, in fact, received a letter from Nixon himself commending him for "handling a very difficult situation uncommonly well". The unprecedented nature of the investigation and reporting on Hart's personal life was widely noted and reported at the time; The New York Times said the situation "will certainly provoke a needed debate on his contention that the system has gone out of control." Having withdrawn from the presidential race, Hart left for Ireland to spend time away from the media with his son. He rented a cottage in Oughterard, though he remained in contact with key members of his team. What news did filter out was that he was not excluding a return to the race. The New York Times also pointed to his odd ambivalence toward the presidency even before being caught by "the system": "Only half of me wants to be President. ... The other half wants to go write novels in Ireland. But the 50 percent that wants to be President is better than 100 percent of the others."

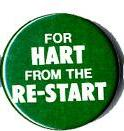
Campaign button

His campaign chairwoman, Colorado congresswoman Patricia Schroeder, jumped into the race following Hart's withdrawal, but soon after withdrew herself at an emotional press conference on September 28, 1987. In December 1987, Hart returned to the race, declaring on the steps of the New Hampshire Statehouse, "Let's let the people decide!" Hart said that the other candidates did not represent his new ideas of strategic investment economics, military reform and "enlightened engagement in foreign policy." Hart warned, "We could lose more young Americans unnecessarily in the Persian Gulf." He initially rose to the top of the polls nationally, and second behind Massachusetts Governor Michael Dukakis in New Hampshire, but was soon confronted with more negative stories about prior debts from his 1984 campaign. He competed in the New Hampshire primary and received 4,888 votes, about four percent. After the Super Tuesday contests on March 8, in which he won no more than five percent of the vote, Hart withdrew from the campaign a second time. Eventual Democratic nominee Michael Dukakis lost the 1988 United States presidential election by a substantial margin in both the popular and electoral vote, by margins unequaled since, winning in only 10 of 50 states. A Miami Herald editor who participated in the paper's initial Hart scandal stories disputed the possibility of a conspiracy theory involving Lee Atwater as published in The Atlantic, which described a reputed deathbed admission by Atwater that he had staged the incident with Donna Rice aboard the yacht Monkey Business.

=== Later career ===
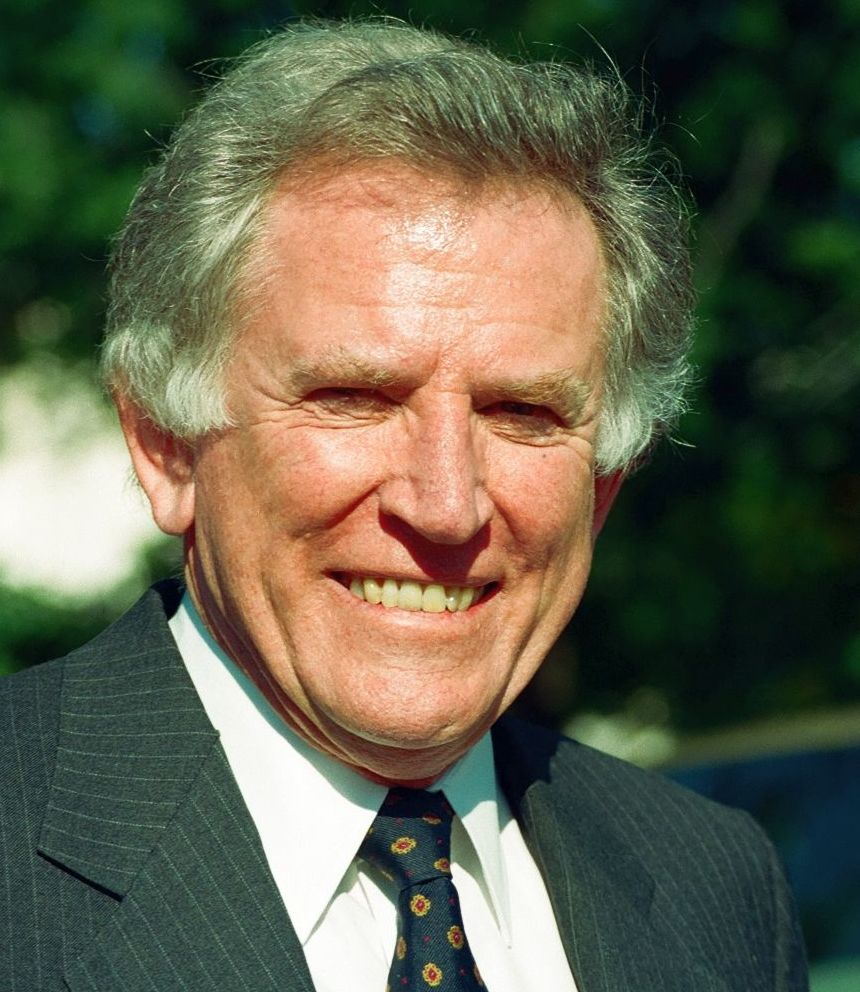
Hart in 1995

After his Senate service and presidential races, Hart resumed his law practice. He remained moderately active in public policy matters, serving on the bipartisan US Commission on National Security/21st Century, also known as the Hart–Rudman Commission, commissioned on behalf of Bill Clinton in 1998 to study U.S. homeland security. The commission issued several findings calling for broad changes to security policy, but none were implemented until after the September 11 attacks. He earned a D.Phil. in politics from the University of Oxford in 2001 with a dissertation entitled The Restoration of the Republic; while at Oxford, he was a member of St Antony's College.

Hart gave a speech before the American international law firm Coudert Brothers on September 4, 2001, exactly one week before the September 11 attacks, warning that within the next 25 years a terrorist attack would lead to mass deaths in the United States. Hart met with aviation executives in Montreal, Canada, on September 5, 2001, to warn of terrorist attacks. The Montreal Gazette reported the story the following day with a headline, "Thousands Will Die, Ex-Presidential Hopeful Says." On September 6, 2001, Hart met with National Security Adviser Condoleezza Rice to urge, "You must move more quickly on homeland security. An attack is going to happen." In a subsequent interview with Salon.com, Hart accused President George W. Bush and other administration officials of ignoring his warnings.

In late 2002, urged by former Oxford classmates, Hart began testing the waters for another run for the presidency, launching a website at GaryHartNews.com and a related speaking tour to gauge reactions from the public. He started his own blog in the spring of 2003, the first prospective presidential candidate to do so. After a few months of speaking, Hart decided not to run for president and instead endorsed Democrat John Kerry. According to an October 23, 2004 National Journal article and later reports in The Washington Post, Hart was mentioned as a probable Cabinet appointment if Kerry won the presidency. He was considered a top candidate for either Director of National Intelligence, Secretary of Homeland Security or Secretary of Defense.

Since May 2005, Hart has been a contributing blogger at HuffPost. He is a member of the Council on Foreign Relations. Hart also sits on the advisory board of Operation USA, a Los Angeles-based international relief and development agency. It was announced in January 2006 that Hart will hold an endowed professorship at the University of Colorado. He is the author of James Monroe, part of the Times Books series on American presidents published in October 2005. Hart is an Honorary Fellow of the Literary & Historical Society of University College Dublin. He is an advisory board member for the Partnership for a Secure America, a not-for-profit organization dedicated to recreating the bipartisan center in American national security and foreign policy. He is also a member of the ReFormers Caucus of Issue One.

In September 2007, The Huffington Post published Hart's letter, "Unsolicited Advice to the Government of Iran", in which he stated that "Provocation is no longer required to take America to war" and warns Iran that "for the next sixteen months or so, you should not only not take provocative actions, you should not seem to be doing so." He went on to suggest that the Bush-Cheney administration was waiting for an opportunity to attack Iran, writing: "Don't give a certain vice president we know the justification he is seeking to attack your country." In an essay published in November 2007, Hart linked American energy policy with national security. Hart wrote, "In fact, we do have an energy policy: It's to continue to import more than half our oil and sacrifice American lives so we can drive our Humvees. This is our current policy, and it is massively immoral." Hart currently sits on the board of directors for the Energy Literacy Advocates. He founded the American Security Project in 2007 and he started a new blog in 2009.

Since retiring from the Senate, he has emerged as a consultant on national security, and continues to speak on a wide range of issues, including the environment and homeland security. In 2006, Hart accepted an endowed professorship at the University of Colorado at Denver. He has been a visiting lecturer at Oxford University, Yale University, and the University of California. He is Chair of the U.S. State Department's International Security Advisory Board, Chair of the U.S. Defense Department's Threat Advisory Council, and Chair of the American Security Project. He was vice-chair of the Advisory Council for the U.S. Secretary of Homeland Security, Co-chair of the U.S.-Russia Commission, Chairman of the Council for a Livable World, and President of Global Green, the U.S. affiliate of Mikhail Gorbachev's environmental foundation. Most notably, he was co-chair of the U.S. Commission on National Security for the 21st Century, known as the Hart-Rudman Commission, which predicted terrorist attacks on America before 9/11. Hart has written or co-authored numerous books and articles, including five novels.

=== U.S. Special Envoy for Northern Ireland ===
In October 2014, President Barack Obama and Secretary of State John Kerry named Hart as the new United States Special Envoy for Northern Ireland. Hart is the second former U.S. Senator to hold the post. The first was George Mitchell, former seat-mate and former Majority Leader of the United States Senate, who served from 1995 to 2001. In a statement, Kerry called Hart "a longtime friend" and said he was "a problem-solver, a brilliant analyst, and someone capable of thinking at once tactically, strategically, and practically."

== Publications ==
=== Nonfiction ===
- The Republic of Conscience (Blue Rider Press, 2016);
- The Thunder and the Sunshine: Four Seasons in a Burnished Life (Fulcrum Publishing, 2010);
- Under The Eagle's Wing: A National Security Strategy of the United States for 2009 (Speaker's Corner, 2008);
- The Courage of Our Convictions: A Manifesto for Democrats (Times Books/Henry Holt, 2006);
- The Shield and The Cloak: The Security of the Commons (Oxford University Press, 2006);
- God and Caesar in America: An Essay on Religion and Politics (Fulcrum Books, 2005);
- James Monroe (in the American Presidency series edited by Arthur Schlesinger, Jr.; Times Books/Henry Holt, 2005);
- The Fourth Power: A New Grand Strategy for the United States in the 21st Century (Oxford University Press, 2004);
- Restoration of the Republic: The Jeffersonian Ideal in 21st Century America (Oxford University dissertation, 2002);
- The Minuteman: Restoring an Army of the People (Free Press, 1998);
- The Patriot: An Exhortation to Liberate America from the Barbarians (Free Press, 1996);
- The Good Fight: The Education of an American Reformer (New York Times Notable Book; Random House, 1993);
- Russia Shakes the World: The Second Russian Revolution (HarperCollins, 1991);
- America Can Win: The Case for Military Reform (Adler and Adler, 1986);
- A New Democracy: A Democratic Vision for the 1980s and Beyond (William Morrow, 1983);
- Right from the Start: A Chronicle of the McGovern Campaign (Quadrangle, 1973);

=== Novels ===
- Durango (Fulcrum Publishing, 2012)
- I, Che Guevara (as John Blackthorn; William Morrow, 2000)
- Sins of the Fathers (as John Blackthorn; William Morrow, 1998)
- The Strategies of Zeus (William Morrow, 1987)
- The Double Man (with William Cohen; William Morrow, 1985)

In January 2000, Hart revealed that he is the political thriller writer John Blackthorn, whose books include Sins of the Fathers and I, Che Guevara.

== Electoral history ==
1974 United States Senate Democratic primary election in Colorado
Party	Candidate	Votes	%
Democratic	Gary Hart	81,161	39.92
Democratic	Herrick Roth	66,819	32.86
Democratic	Marty Miller	55,339	27.22

1974 United States Senate election in Colorado
Party	Candidate	Votes	%	±%
Democratic	Gary Hart	471,901	57.23	+15.78
Republican	Peter Dominick (incumbent)	325,508	39.50	−19.05
Independent	John M. King	16,131	1.96	N/A
Prohibition	Joseph Fred Hyskell	8,410	1.02	+1.02
Independent	Henry John Olshaw	2,395	0.29	N/A
Independent	Jack Marsh (write-in)	31	0.00	N/A
Democratic gain from Republican				

1980 United States Senate election in Colorado
Party	Candidate	Votes	%	±%
Democratic	Gary Hart (incumbent)	590,501	50.33	−6.90
Republican	Mary Estill Buchanan	571,295	48.70	+9.20
Statesman	Earl Higgerson	7,265	0.62	
Independent American	Henry John Olshaw	4,081	0.35	
Majority		19,206	1.64%	−16.10
Turnout		1,173,142		
Democratic hold		Swing		

1984 Democratic Party presidential primaries
Party	Candidate	Votes	%
Democratic	Walter Mondale	6,952,912	38.32
Democratic	Gary Hart	6,504,842	35.85
Democratic	Jesse Jackson	3,282,431	18.09
Democratic	John Glenn	617,909	3.41
Democratic	George McGovern	334,801	1.85
N/A	Unpledged	146,212	0.81
Democratic	Lyndon LaRouche	123,649	0.68
Democratic	Reubin O'Donovan Askew	52,759	0.29
Democratic	Alan Cranston	51,437	0.28
Democratic	Ernest Hollings	33,684	0.19

1984 Democratic National Convention
Party	Candidate	Votes	%
Democratic	Walter Mondale	2,191	56.41
Democratic	Gary Hart	1,201	30.92
Democratic	Jesse Jackson	466	12.00
Democratic	Thomas Eagleton	18	0.46
Democratic	George McGovern	4	0.10
Democratic	John Glenn	2	0.05
Democratic	Joe Biden	1	0.03
Independent	Martha Kirkland	1	0.03

1988 Democratic Party presidential primaries
Party	Candidate	Votes	%
Democratic	Michael Dukakis	9,898,750	42.47
Democratic	Jesse Jackson	6,788,991	29.13
Democratic	Al Gore	3,185,806	13.67
Democratic	Dick Gephardt	1,399,041	6.00
Democratic	Paul M. Simon	1,082,960	4.65
Democratic	Gary Hart	415,716	1.78
N/A	Unpledged	250,307	1.07
Democratic	Bruce Babbitt	77,780	0.33
Democratic	Lyndon LaRouche	70,938	0.30
Democratic	David Duke	45,289	0.19
Democratic	James Traficant	30,879	0.13
Democratic	Douglas Applegate	25,068	0.11

1988 Democratic National Convention
Party	Candidate	Votes	%
Democratic	Michael Dukakis	2,877	70.09
Democratic	Jesse Jackson	1,219	29.70
Democratic	Richard Stallings	3	0.07
Democratic	Joe Biden	2	0.05
Democratic	Dick Gephardt	2	0.05
Democratic	Lloyd Bentsen	1	0.02
Democratic	Gary Hart	1	0.02

== In popular culture ==
- In the novel First Among Equals by Jeffrey Archer (first published in 1984), Hart was elected as president in 1988, succeeding Ronald Reagan. Hart's social and economic policies undermined Margaret Thatcher's Conservative minority government, resulting in an early general election in the United Kingdom in 1989 which Labour won.
- Hart appeared as himself on a May 1986 episode of Cheers (episode 425; "Strange Bedfellows, Part 2").
- In a November 1987 episode of The Golden Girls, "Brotherly Love" (S3/E8), Dorothy's ex-brother-in-law, Ted, asks Rose, who is still in a nightgown, what she does for a living. Dorothy cuts into their conversation and quips, "She's Gary Hart's campaign manager. It doesn't pay much, but you don't have to get out of bed to do it."
- Crosby, Stills, Nash & Young released a video satirizing the events of the Miami Herald's stake-out of Hart's home, and other events of 1987, in American Dream (Neil Young, 1988).
- Chilean folk-rock band Sexual Democracia's song "Don't Cry, Gary Hart", a cueca sung in English, appears on their album Buscando Chilenos 2 (1992).
- In the final chapter of Stephen King's Dark Tower series, The Dark Tower, the character Susannah Dean travels to an alternate 1980s United States where Hart is president. In the novel Misery by the same author, the main character, Paul Sheldon, has a "Hart for President" sticker on his car.
- In his 2011 novella trilogy Then Everything Changed, author Jeff Greenfield creates an alternate history in which Hart defeats Ronald Reagan in the 1980 presidential election, following Gerald Ford's surprise victory in 1976.
- The "womanizer" scandal involving Donna Rice is the topic of an episode of the RadioLab podcast (January 29, 2016).
- At a 2015 concert in Denver, Bono of U2 recognized Hart for his work in the Irish peace process: "And tonight, in the room, I want to thank Gary Hart for his work in bringing peace to our country in Ireland. You worked hard on it, sir."
- Hart is portrayed by Hugh Jackman in the 2018 film The Front Runner, which focuses on his 1987 scandals.
- The February 7, 2019, episode of the You're Wrong About podcast discussed Hart.
- In the third season of the alternate history TV series For All Mankind, Hart wins the 1984 presidential election against Ronald Reagan's Vice President Richard Schweiker. He then wins re-election in a landslide against Pat Robertson in the 1988 presidential election. As President, he welcomes the advent of nuclear fusion energy and declines to intervene in the Iraqi invasion of Kuwait.

== See also ==
- Atari Democrat
- Buie Seawell
- List of federal political sex scandals in the United States

== Explanatory notes ==
Party political offices
Preceded by Stephen McNichols	Democratic nominee for U.S. Senator from Colorado (Class 3); 1974, 1980	Succeeded by Tim Wirth
Vacant Title last held by John Rhodes; Ted Stevens; 1980	Response to the State of the Union address 1982; Served alongside: Robert Byrd, Alan Cranston, Al Gore, Bennett Johnston, Ted Kennedy, Tip O'Neill, Don Riegle, Paul Sarbanes, Jim Sasser	Succeeded by Les AuCoin, Joe Biden, Bill Bradley, Robert Byrd, Tom Daschle, Bill Hefner, Barbara B. Kennelly, George Miller, Tip O'Neill, Paul Tsongas, Tim Wirth
U.S. Senate
Preceded by Peter Dominick	United States Senator (Class 3) from Colorado; 1975–1987; Served alongside: Floyd Haskell, Bill Armstrong	Succeeded by Tim Wirth
Diplomatic posts
Vacant Title last held by Declan Kelly; 2011	United States Special Envoy for Northern Ireland; 2014–2017	Vacant Title next held by Mick Mulvaney; 2020
U.S. order of precedence (ceremonial)
Preceded by Ben Nelson as Former U.S. Senator	Order of precedence of the United States as Former U.S. Senator	Succeeded by Wayne Allard as Former U.S. Senator
