= 1974 United States Senate election in Colorado =

- November 5, 1974
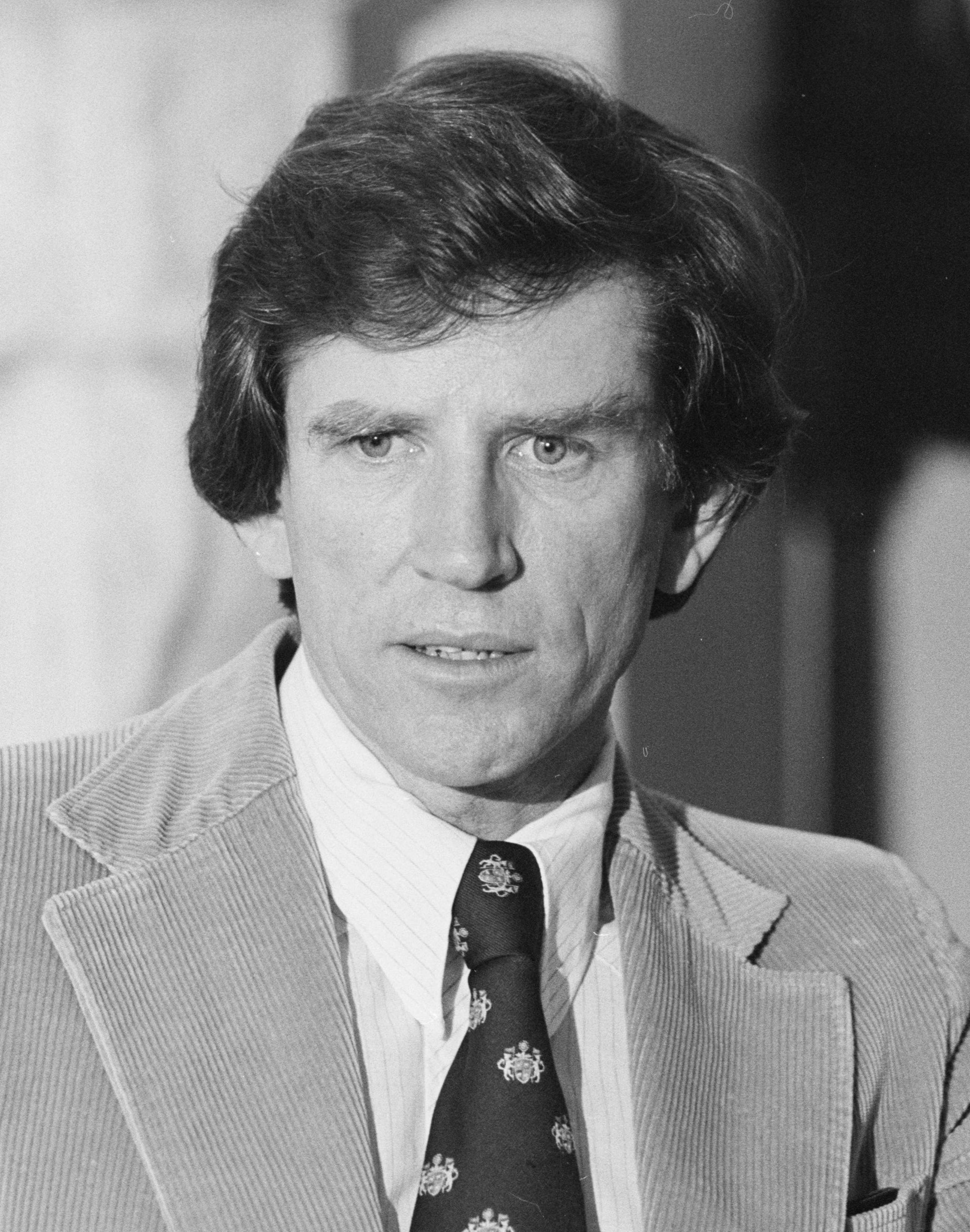

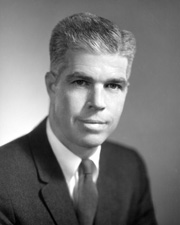
Nominee	Gary Hart	Peter Dominick
Party	Democratic	Republican
Popular vote	471,691	325,508
Percentage	57.23%	39.50%
- County results Hart: 40–50% 50–60% 60–70% Dominick: 40–50% 50–60% 60–70%
U.S. senator before election
Peter Dominick
Republican
Elected U.S. Senator
Gary Hart
Democratic

The 1974 United States Senate election in Colorado took place on November 5, 1974. Incumbent Republican U.S. Senator Peter Dominick ran for re-election to a third term in office, but was defeated by Democrat Gary Hart.

As of 2026, this is the last time that an incumbent senator from Colorado lost re-election for this seat, and the last time that El Paso County voted for the Democratic candidate in a U.S. Senate election until 2026.

== Democratic primary ==
=== Candidates ===
- Gary Hart, campaign manager for George McGovern in 1972
- Marty Miller, Arapahoe County district attorney
- Herrick Roth, former state senator from Denver and former president of the Colorado Labor Council

=== Results ===
Democratic primary results
Party	Candidate	Votes	%
Democratic	Gary Hart	81,161	39.92%
Democratic	Herrick Roth	66,819	32.86%
Democratic	Marty Miller	55,339	27.22%
Total votes		203,319	100.00%

== General election ==
=== Results ===
1974 United States Senate election in Colorado
Party	Candidate	Votes	%	±%
Democratic	Gary Hart	471,691	57.23%	▲15.78
Republican	Peter Dominick (incumbent)	325,508	39.50%	▼19.05
Independent	John M. King	16,131	1.96%	N/A
Prohibition	Joseph Fred Hyskell	8,410	1.02%	▲1.02
Independent	Henry John Olshaw	2,395	0.29%	N/A
Independent	Jack Marsh (write-in)	31	0.00%	N/A
Total votes		824,166	100.00%	
Democratic gain from Republican		Swing		

== See also ==
- 1974 United States Senate elections
