= Mary Buchanan =

Mary Buchanan may refer to:

- Mary Beth Buchanan (born 1963), American lawyer
- Mary Estill Buchanan (born 1934), American politician in Colorado
