= Senator Farwell =

Senator Farwell may refer to:

- Charles B. Farwell (1823–1903), U.S. Senator from Illinois from 1887 to 1891
- Nathan A. Farwell (1812–1893), U.S. Senator from Maine from 1864 to 1865

== See also ==
- Senator Fawell (disambiguation)
