= Bo Callaway =

American businessman and politician (1927–2014)

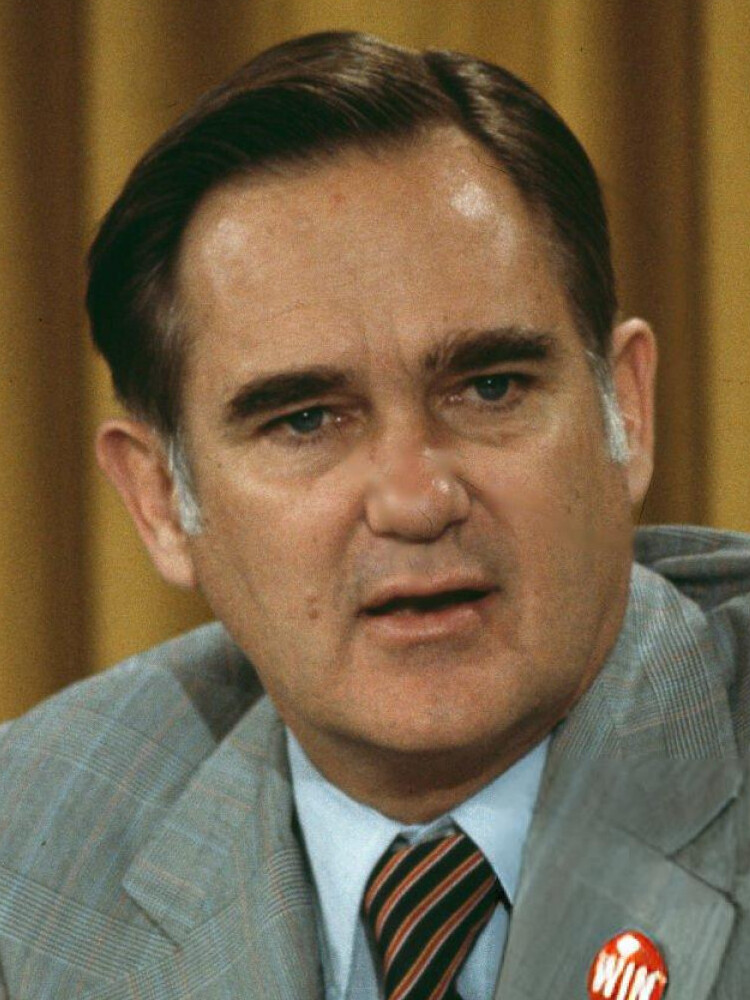
- Callaway in 1974

11th United States Secretary of the Army
- In office May 15, 1973 – July 3, 1975
- President: Richard Nixon; Gerald Ford
- Preceded by: Robert F. Froehlke
- Succeeded by: Norman R. Augustine (acting); Martin R. Hoffmann

Member of the U.S. House of Representatives from Georgia's 3rd district
- In office January 3, 1965 – January 3, 1967
- Preceded by: Tic Forrester
- Succeeded by: Jack Brinkley

Personal details
- Born: Howard Hollis Callaway; April 2, 1927 LaGrange, Georgia, U.S.
- Died: March 15, 2014 (aged 86) Columbus, Georgia, U.S.
- Party: Republican
- Spouse: Beth Walton (m. 1949; died 2009)
- Children: 5
- Relatives: Fuller Earle Callaway (grandfather); Terry Considine (son-in-law)
- Education: Georgia Tech; United States Military Academy (BS)

Military service
- Allegiance: United States
- Branch/service: United States Army
- Years of service: 1949–1952
- Rank: Lieutenant
- Battles/wars: Korean War

Howard Hollis Callaway (April 2, 1927 – March 15, 2014) was an American businessman and politician. A member of the Republican Party, he served in the United States House of Representatives from 1965 to 1967 and as the United States secretary of the Army from 1973 to 1975.

== Life and career ==
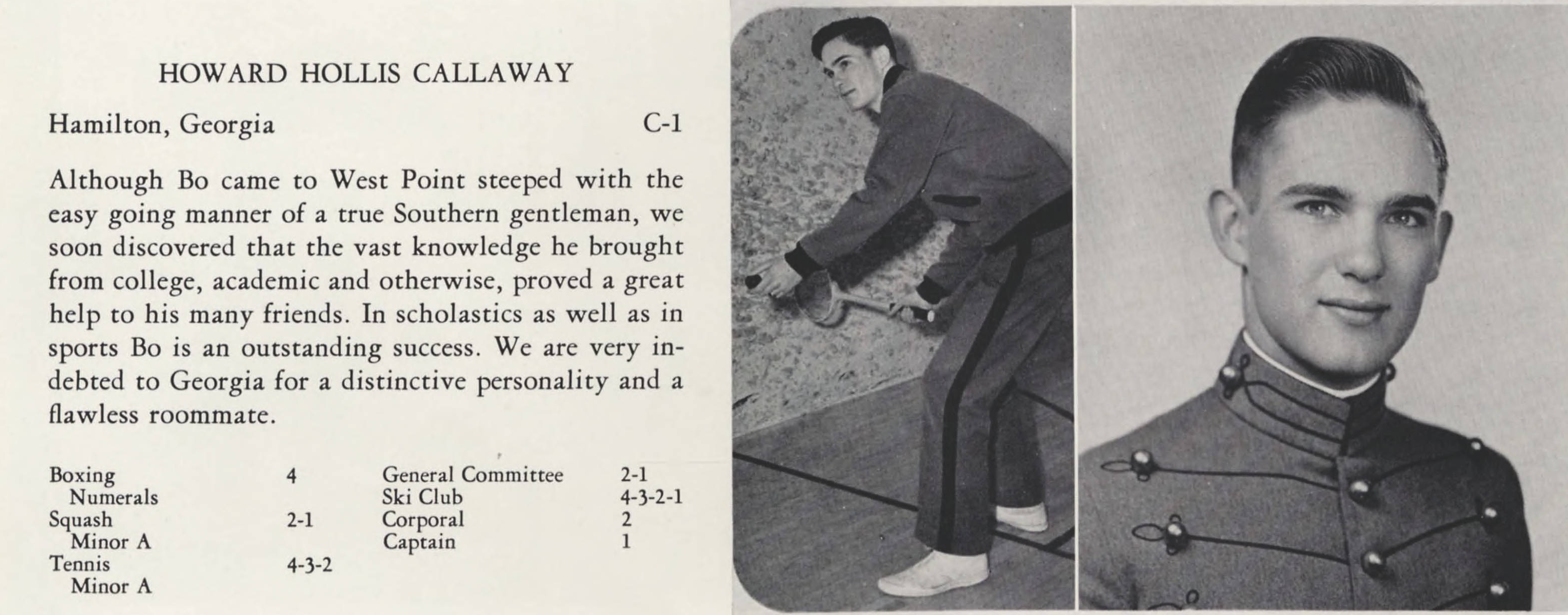
Callaway in the United States Military Academy yearbook, 1949

Callaway was born in LaGrange, Georgia, the son of Virginia Hollis and Cason Callaway, and the grandson of Fuller Earle Callaway. He attended Episcopal High School in Alexandria, Virginia, graduating in 1944. After graduating, he attended Georgia Tech and the United States Military Academy, earning his degree in military engineering in 1949. He served in the United States Army during the Korean War, which after his discharge in 1953, he returned to Georgia to help his parents develop and run Callaway Gardens. He was named executive director there on June 10, 1953.

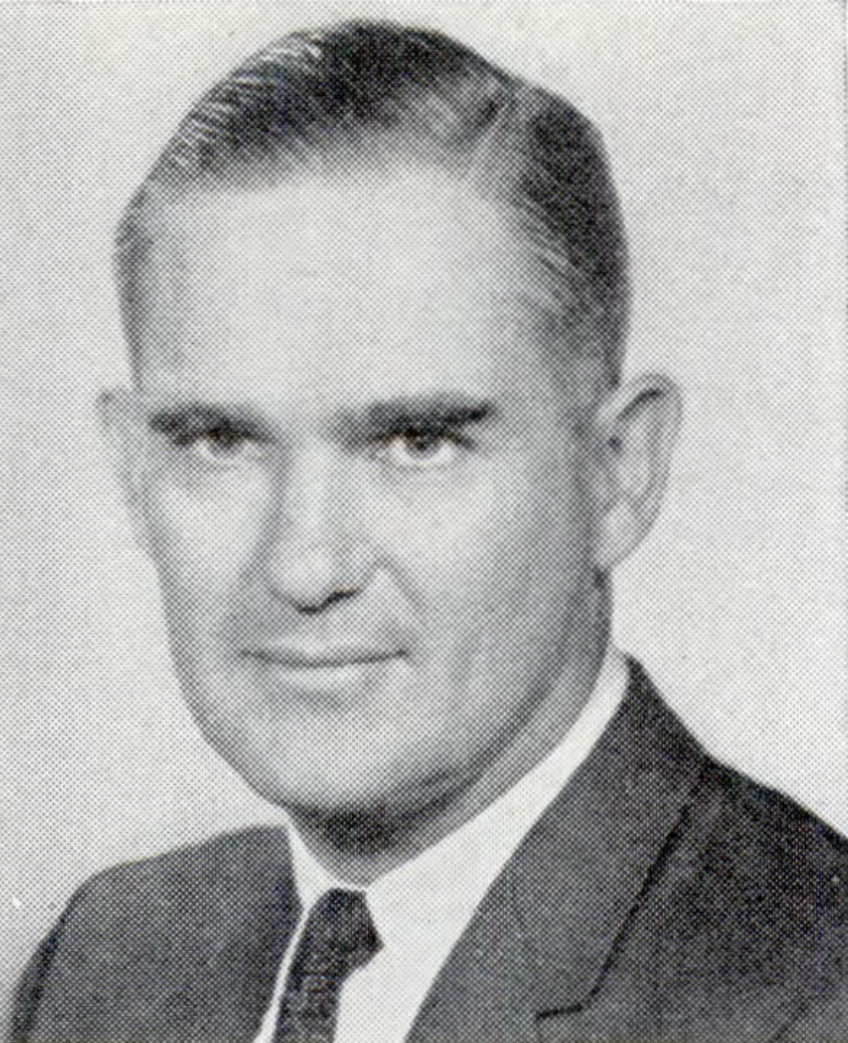
Callaway in 1965

In 1964, he was elected as a Republican to represent Georgia's 3rd congressional district in the United States House of Representatives, succeeding Tic Forrester. He was the first Republican to represent Georgia in Congress since Reconstruction, riding a Republican wave in the Deep South resulting from the appeal of Barry Goldwater to conservative Southerners.

Rather than run for re-election, in 1966, Callaway ran as for governor of Georgia. The gubernatorial election was exceptionally close due to a split within the state Democratic Party between supporters of segregationist Lester Maddox and liberal former governor Ellis Arnall; after Maddox won the Democratic nomination, Arnall continued his campaign as a write-in candidate. Ultimately, Callaway won a plurality, but not a majority of votes cast, which under Georgia law meant that the election was thrown to the Georgia General Assembly. After a series of lawsuits reaching the United States Supreme Court, the authority of the legislature was ultimately upheld, and Maddox was elected governor by the heavily Democratic legislature.

Callaway was succeeded in Congress by Jack Brinkley.

=== Later career ===
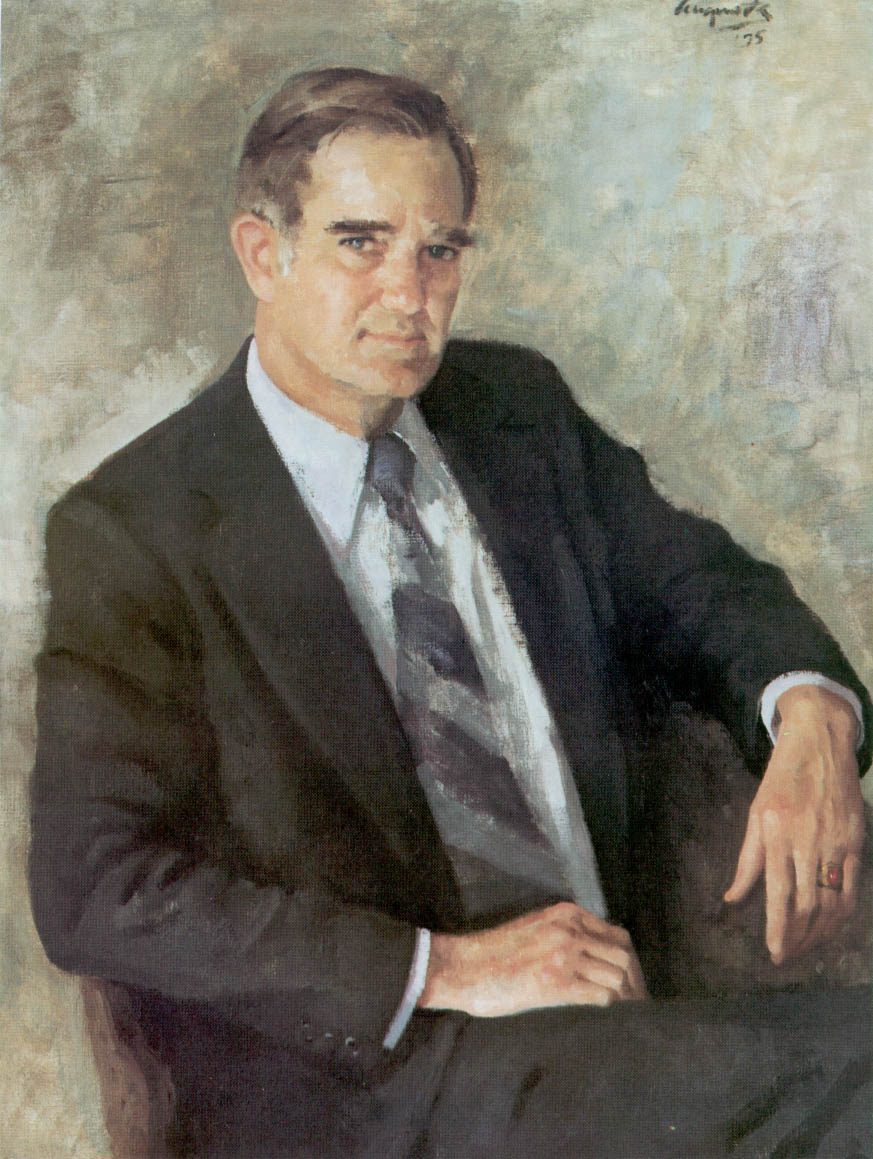
Portrait of Callaway

Callaway resided in Colorado in the 1970s. In 1973, he was appointed by President Richard Nixon to serve as the United States Secretary of the Army, serving under Nixon and Gerald Ford and was succeeded by Norman R. Augustine in 1975. During his service as secretary of the army, he entered into a prominent national controversy when he first reduced the sentence of and later paroled lieutenant William Calley for his role in the My Lai massacre.

Callaway served as Ford's campaign manager, but resigned following accusations that he had used undue political influence to ensure the expansion of a ski resort; he was replaced by Rogers Morton.

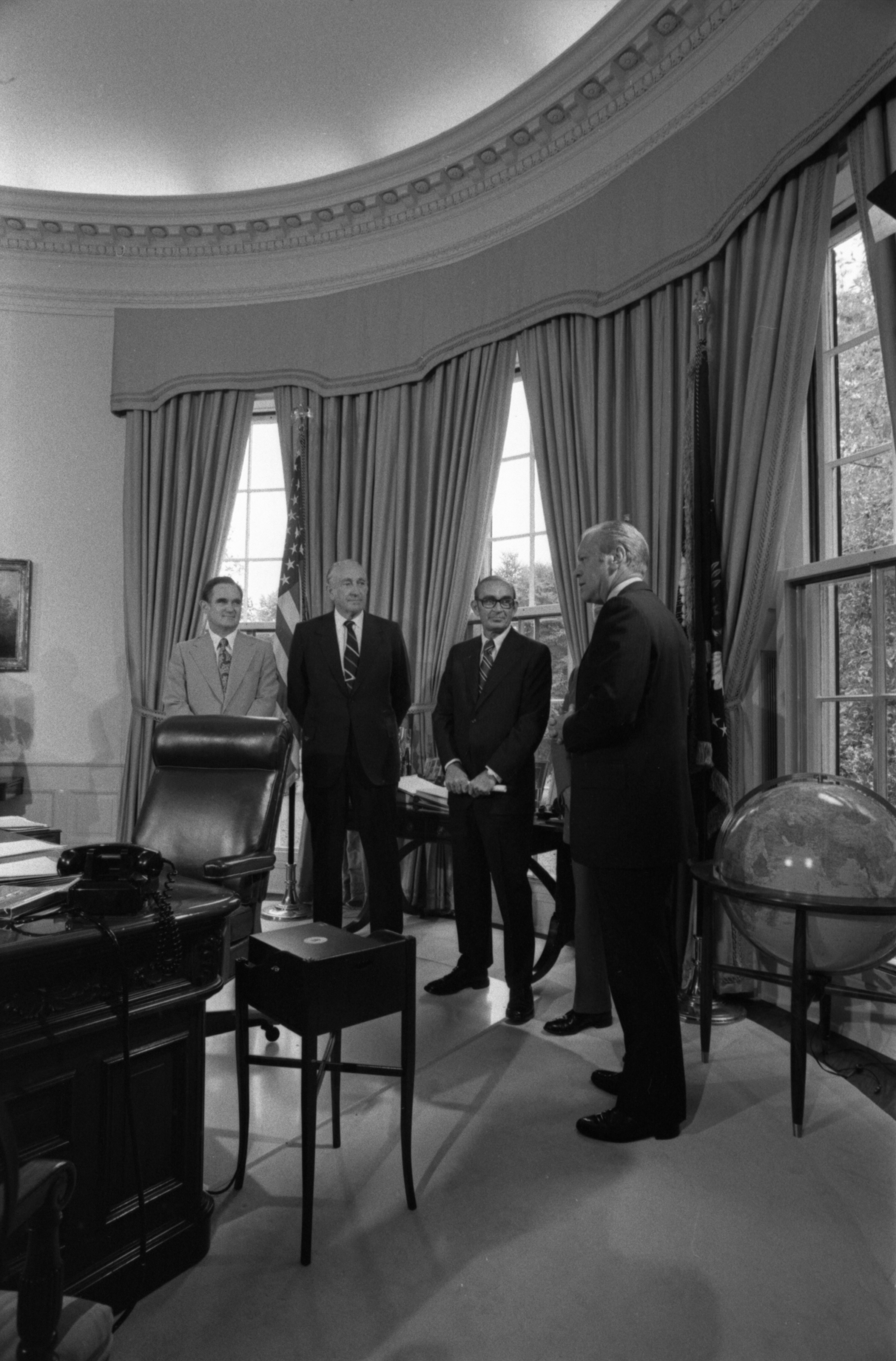
Callaway with President Ford & others in the Oval Office.

In 1980, Callaway ran as for the Republican nomination in the United States Senate election in Colorado. He was supported by Senator William L. Armstrong, but ultimately lost the nomination to Mary Estill Buchanan. After that, he served as the chairperson of the Colorado Republican Party until 1987.

== Death ==
Callaway died on March 15, 2014, from complications of intracerebral hemorrhage in Columbus, Georgia, at the age of 86.

U.S. House of Representatives
Preceded by Tic Forrester	Member of the U.S. House of Representatives from Georgia's 3rd congressional district January 3, 1965 – January 3, 1967	Succeeded by Jack Thomas Brinkley
Party political offices
Vacant Title last held by Roscoe Pickett	Republican nominee for Governor of Georgia; 1966	Succeeded by Hal Suit
Government offices
Preceded by Robert F. Froehlke	United States Secretary of the Army; May 1973 – July 1975	Succeeded by Martin R. Hoffmann
