= 1980 United States Senate election in Colorado =

- November 4, 1980

Nominee	Gary Hart	Mary Estill Buchanan
Party	Democratic	Republican
Popular vote	590,501	571,295
Percentage	50.33%	48.70%
- County results Hart: 50–60% 60–70% Bunchanan: 50–60% 60–70% 70–80%
U.S. senator before election
Gary Hart
Democratic
Elected U.S. senator
Gary Hart
Democratic

The 1980 United States Senate election in Colorado was held on November 4, 1980, to elect a member of the United States Senate to represent the state of Colorado. Democratic incumbent Gary Hart won re-election to a second term, defeating Republican secretary of state Mary Estill Buchanan. This election was the first time a Democratic incumbent won reelection since 1948.

== Republican primary ==
=== Candidates ===
- Mary Estill Buchanan, Colorado Secretary of State
- Bo Callaway, former Secretary of the Army and former U.S. Representative from Georgia
- John Cogswell, attorney
- Sam H. Zakhem, former State Senator

== General election ==
=== Candidates ===
- Mary Estill Buchanan, Colorado Secretary of State (Republican)
- Gary Hart, incumbent Senator since 1975 (Democratic)
- Earl Higgerson (Statesman)
- Henry John Olshaw (Independent American)

General election results
Party	Candidate	Votes	%	±%
Democratic	Gary Hart (inc.)	590,501	50.33%	−6.90%
Republican	Mary Estill Buchanan	571,295	48.70%	+9.20%
Statesman	Earl Higgerson	7,265	0.62%	
Independent American	Henry John Olshaw	4,081	0.35%	
Majority		19,206	1.64%	−16.10%
Turnout		1,173,142		
Democratic hold		Swing		

== See also ==
- 1980 United States Senate elections
