= Lottie Holman O'Neill =

American politician (1878–1967)

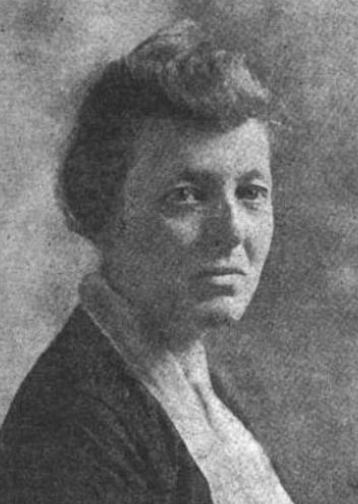
- Lottie Holman O'Neill, from a 1923 newsletter

Member of the Illinois Senate from the 41st district
- In office 1951–1963
- Preceded by: Richard J. Barr
- Succeeded by: Harris W. Fawell

Member of the Illinois House of Representatives from the 41st district
- In office 1933–1951
- Preceded by: Otto A. Buck
- Succeeded by: John M. King
- In office 1923–1931
- Preceded by: William R. McCabe
- Succeeded by: Otto A. Buck

Personal details
- Born: November 7, 1878 Barry, Illinois, U.S.
- Died: February 17, 1967 (aged 88) Downers Grove, Illinois, U.S.
- Party: Republican
- Spouse: William J. O'Neill
- Children: 2
- Profession: Politician

Lottie (Holman) O'Neill (November 7, 1878 – February 17, 1967) was an American politician from Illinois who was the first woman elected to the Illinois General Assembly. First elected in 1922, O'Neill served 40 years in the Assembly, the longest-serving female elected official in the United States at the time.

O'Neill's record as the longest-serving female legislator in Illinois history for her service during 19 General Assemblies was surpassed when Barbara Flynn Currie was reelected to a twentieth term.

== Biography ==
She was born November 7, 1878, in Barry, Illinois. She attended the common schools.

She earned a business degree, and then moved to Chicago. In 1904 she married Irish Australian immigrant William O'Neill, with whom she had two sons. The family moved to Downers Grove, Illinois, in 1908. O'Neill became an activist for equal voting rights, working with the League of Women Voters.

== Political career ==
O'Neill was inspired by the political success of Jeannette Rankin of Montana, who in 1916 was the first woman elected to the United States House of Representatives.

In 1920, women in Illinois gained the right to vote. In the next election cycle, O'Neill was encouraged by her husband to run for the legislature. She ran as a Republican and won one of the 41st district's three seats. At the beginning of her legislative career, she was frustrated when out of her thirteen proposed bills only three were able to pass the Illinois House. During her early career, she focused on equal rights for women, introducing the eight-hour work day and improving state assistance for disabled children.

In 1930, O'Neill ran against incumbent Richard J. Barr in the 41st district Republican primary for the Illinois Senate. She lost the Republican primary, but entered that year's United States Senate election as an independent candidate with the backing of the Illinois chapter of the Anti-Saloon League. O'Neill ran an aggressive campaign accusing Republican Ruth Hanna McCormick of corruption and attacking McCormick's inconsistent stance on prohibition. McCormick, who defeated Charles S. Deneen in the Republican primary, lost the election to Democrat J. Hamilton Lewis with O'Neill finishing a distant third.

She returned to the Illinois House in 1933. In 1935, a Democratic lawmaker called for O'Neill to be expelled from the House after she and a colleague introduced a resolution critical of President Franklin D. Roosevelt and Governor Henry Horner. The matter was settled after the offending resolution was withdrawn. Holman O'Neill was the chief sponsor of the bill that allowed women to serve on juries in Illinois. The bill passed in 1939, decades after Alta Hulett became the first woman admitted to the Illinois bar.

During her second House tenure O'Neill grew more conservative, a trend that would continue for the rest of her political career. She opposed federal income tax, growing state budgets, and "excessive regulations." Prior to the attack on Pearl Harbor, she was a supporter of the America First Committee and the Ludlow Amendment. After the war was declared, she remained a critic of the Roosevelt administration's wartime conduct and decisions.

Her isolationist tendencies would continue after World War II. She was a supporter of the Bricker Amendment and an opponent of American membership in the United Nations. In 1946, she successfully prevented National Federation of Republican Women from endorsing the proposed United Nations. Her opposition to the UN was so strong she even wished to see a ban on public buildings in Illinois flying the flag of the United Nations.

In 1950, O'Neill ran for the Illinois Senate in the 41st again. This time she faced James M. Barr, the nephew of retiring Senator Richard Barr, in the Republican primary. She won the Republican nomination by over 1,000 votes. In the general election, she easily defeated Democratic candidate and former state legislator Joseph Sam Perry of Glen Ellyn. In the Illinois House, she was succeeded by John M. King who at 23 was the youngest person elected to said body since Stephen A. Douglas.

O'Neill defeated the party's preferred slate of delegates to the 1956 Republican National Convention, which re-nominated Dwight Eisenhower. Prior to Eisenhower's nomination, she pressed the RNC on whether or not Eisenhower had adequately recovered from his heart attack, embarrassing the party. In 1958, 29 year old DuPage County Assistant State's Attorney, Harris Fawell challenged O'Neill in the 41st district Republican primary for the Illinois Senate. She defeated Fawell and was reelected to her sixth term.

In 1960, she founded the Northern Illinois Conservatives with the hopes of creating a voting bloc that would move the Republican Party further right. The organization lobbied delegates at the 1960 Republican National Convention to take up their positions including fiscally conservative stances against taxation and spending and opposition to the 1960 Democratic National Convention's platform in favor of civil rights for African Americans. O'Neill would blame Nixon's loss on his stances as a Rockefeller Republican.

She announced her retirement from the legislature January 8, 1962. She was succeeded in the Illinois Senate by her 1958 primary opponent Harris Fawell. In the 1964 presidential election, O'Neill was a staunch supporter of Barry Goldwater.

She was described as strong willed and independent, and was referred to by her colleagues as the "conscience of the Senate".

== Later life ==
O'Neill retired from politics in 1963 at age 84. She died in Downers Grove, Illinois, on February 17, 1967, at age 88. She is buried at Oak Crest Cemetery in Downers Grove.

== Legacy ==
A historical marker about her achievements can be found next to her gravesite.

O'Neill Middle School in Downers Grove, Illinois, is named in her honor. A statue in the rotunda of the Illinois State Capitol was erected in 1976 to commemorate O'Neill.
