= Fuller Earle Callaway =

American businessman (1870–1928)

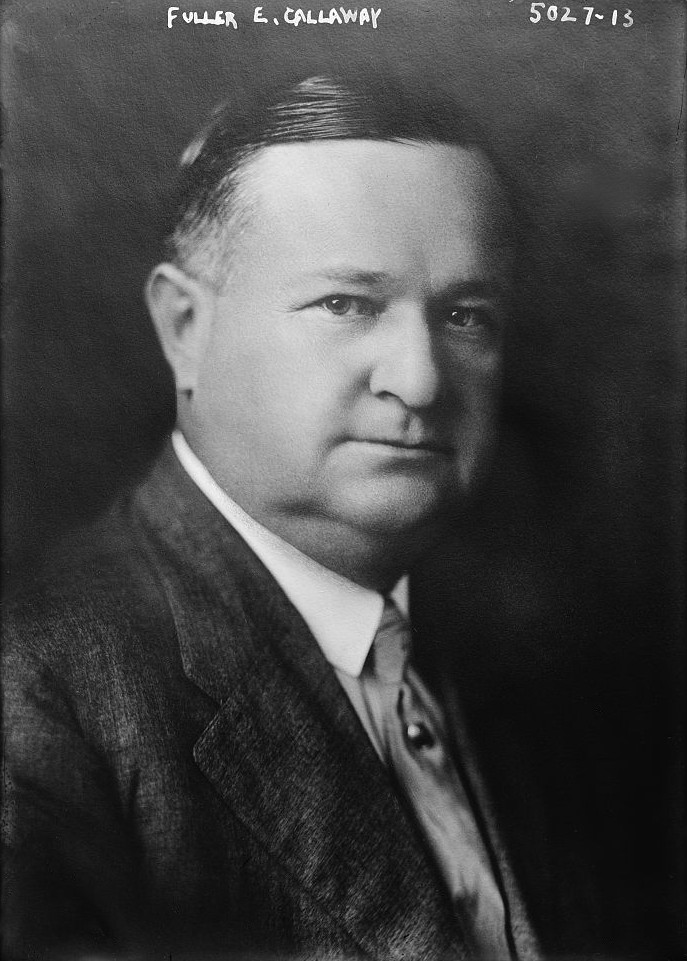
- Callaway c. 1918
- Born: July 15, 1870; LaGrange, Georgia, U.S.
- Died: February 12, 1928 (aged 57); LaGrange, Troup County, Georgia, U.S.
- Occupation(s): Businessman, textile manufacturer
- Spouse: Ida Cason Callaway
- Children: 2
- Relatives: Bo Callaway (grandson)

Fuller Earle Callaway Sr. (July 15, 1870 – February 12, 1928) was an American textile manufacturer who was regarded as one of the leading industrial magnates of the Southern United States during the first decades of the 20th century.

== Biography ==
=== Early years ===
Fuller E. Callaway was born in the county seat of LaGrange in Troup County, Georgia, on July 15, 1870, the son of a second-generation Baptist minister, Rev. Abner Reeves Callaway. His mother, the former Sarah Jane Howard, died when Fuller was 8 years old. He is a descendant of the family that founded the Callaway Plantation in Washington, Georgia.

Entrepreneurial in spirit from his youth, at age 18 Callaway made use of $500 he had saved in addition to borrowed starting capital and launched a dime store in his native LaGrange. He followed the business model established by F.W. Woolworth & Co. Callaway's venture proved successful. After expansion, his Callaway Department Store became the largest such firm in LaGrange and the flagship of a small regional chain.

=== Textile manufacturer ===
Callaway's success as a dry goods merchant provided him with capital of his own. In 1895 he invested in LaGrange's first modern textile manufacturing facility, Dixie Mills.

Callaway later recalled:

It was like the measles in the South in those days. Every town wanted to build a cotton mill.... We did not have much of anything, but we got up a cotton mill; and auctioned off the directorships. Anybody that would take $5,000 worth of stock, we would make a director; and if a widow with a son had $2,000, we would make the son a bookkeeper.... A good many of the laborers took stock in it. We had a great many poor white people with the highest type of morality and religion. They could not produce cotton at five cents a pound against the negro; and these men began to move to town as cotton mill operatives.

Although the mill was originally run with managers brought to the South from New England, investors soon prevailed upon Callaway to take over the active management of the facility himself. The operation was put onto a sound footing, and Callaway cashed out his stock in the operation, determined to leave the textile business. This decision proved to be short-lived, however.

In 1901, Callaway was a leading investor in a new facility, Unity Mills. Callaway worked as secretary-treasurer of the company, later known as Kex Plant, and continued to reinvest his profits over the subsequent two decades. He opened several other mills within a 100-mile radius of LaGrange.

Callaway subsequently expanded his regional empire into other businesses, helping to launch such firms as the LaGrange National Bank, the LaGrange Savings Bank, Security Warehouse Company, the Callaway Development Company, and the Manchester Development Company.

Callaway served as a Railroad Commissioner of Georgia from 1907 to 1909 (the predecessor to the Public Service Commission). For a time he was the president of the American Cotton Manufacturers Association.

In 1919 Callaway was named by President Woodrow Wilson as one of 22 members of a blue ribbon Industrial Relations Committee. They met in October of that year in an attempt to negotiate broad agreement on wages and prices in the rapidly evolving post-World War I American economy, but were unsuccessful. It was an era of strikes in major industries as workers struggled for better wages and working conditions, while the economy was absorbing thousands of veterans returning to the work force.

=== Death and legacy ===
Fuller E. Callaway Sr. died on February 12, 1928, at his home, Hills and Dales Estate in LaGrange, Georgia. One son, Fuller E. Callaway Jr., would later become the CEO of Callaway Mills. Callaway Plaza on the campus of the Georgia Institute of Technology is named after him. The other son, Cason Jewell Callaway, founded Callaway Gardens.
