= Beverly Fawell =

American politician

Member of the Illinois Senate from the 41st district
- In office 1983–1999

Member of the U.S. House of Representatives from Illinois's 41st district
- In office 1981–1982

Personal details
- Born: September 17, 1930 Oak Park, Illinois, U.S
- Died: June 22, 2013 (aged 82) DuPage County, Illinois, U.S.
- Party: Republican
- Education: Northern Illinois University; Elmhurst College

Beverly Fawell (September 17, 1930 – June 22, 2013) was an Illinois politician from Glen Ellyn, part of a family prominent in the Republican Party in Du Page County, Illinois (her brother-in-law was Congressman Harris Fawell).

== Education ==
Born in Oak Park, Illinois, Fawell received her bachelor's degree in elementary education and business administration from Elmhurst College and did graduate studies in political science at Northern Illinois University.

== Political career ==
She served as a member of the Illinois House of Representatives from the 41st district (1981–82), and as a member of the Illinois Senate from the 20th district from 1983 until she resigned her seat in late 1999 after the death of her son Steve, reportedly to take care of his orphaned children, but in January 2000 was appointed to a $85,000-a-year job post as chief of communications and community relations for the Illinois State Toll Highway Authority. She was succeeded by Peter Roskam.

== George Ryan connection ==
In 1994, Fawell withstood a strong challenge in the Republican primary election from Michael Formento, a DuPage County Board member, former mayor of Glen Ellyn and intra-party foe of Senate President James "Pate" Philip.

== Later life and death ==
After spending ten days at Central DuPage Hospital, Fawell died of chronic heart failure on Saturday, June 22, 2013, at the age of 82.
