= Hills and Dales Estate =

Historic house in Georgia, United States

Coordinates: 33.03900°N 85.04966°W

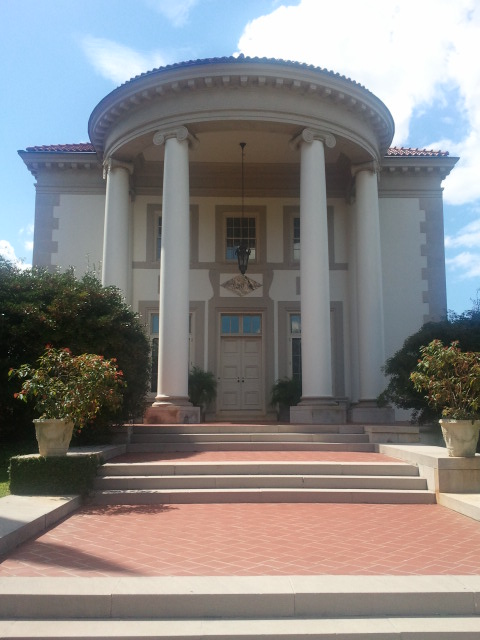
Front view

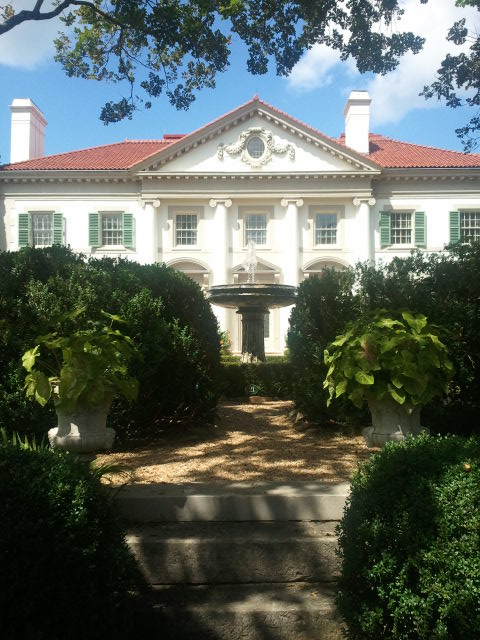
Side view

Hills and Dales Estate is the home built for textile magnate Fuller Earle Callaway and his wife Ida Cason Callaway completed in 1916 in Lagrange, Georgia. The property includes the pre-Civil War Ferrell Gardens started by Nancy Ferrell in 1832 and expanded by her daughter Sarah Coleman Ferrell beginning in 1841.

== History of the House ==
Fuller E. Callaway purchased the estate of Judge Blount and Sarah Ferrell in 1912. Neel Reid, of the Hentz, Reid & Adler architectural firm, designed the 13,000-square-foot (1,200 m^{2}) Callaway home to complement the Italian boxwood garden created by the Ferrells. The design of the home is also said to have been inspired by one of Reid's favorite architects, Charles Adams Platt and his adaptations of Italian villas set in formal landscape gardens. The Italian style of the home is evident by its white stucco exterior and red tile roof. The east side of the home presents a grand two-story semi-circular portico with Ionic columns. Neel Reid's signature classic style is featured in the interior of the home with its double staircase, stone fireplaces (one of which was changed to wood by Philip Schutze in 1948) and the long, narrow palm room with vaulted ceiling and low marble wainscot.

Hills & Dales Estate is a contributing structure to the Vernon Road Historic District on the National Register of Historic Places.

== History of Ferrell Gardens ==
Blount and Sarah Ferrell married in 1835 and eventually settled on land given to them by her father. In 1841, Mrs. Ferrell initiated the development of a formal boxwood parterre garden along the facing slope of the property, which had been used for cotton cultivation. Mrs. Ferrell incorporated various religious symbols and motifs into the gardens' design as a confirmation and testimony of her belief that Ferrell gardens should be a reflection of faith and religious piety. She grew a wide variety of plants and incorporated locally quarried stone to create walls, steps and terraces.

Ferrell gardens, or The Terraces as they were called, became nationally noted for their beauty and were open to the public. One such visit was written up in the local newspaper of the time, The LaGrange Reporter, who wrote of the majestic grove of oaks, the scented breeze and how they were speechless with astonishment at the bewildering paradise opening out before us.

Italian Villa Built In Georgia's Most Famous Garden proclaimed The Atlanta Journal on April 30, 1916, when Fuller and Ida Callaway opened their new home to visitors for their 25th wedding anniversary. The article goes on to quote Mr. Callaway talking about the garden:

Forestry and botanical experts, amazed at the wonderful growth of flowers, shrubs and trees, some rare specimens of which from Japan, Australia, China and the Holy Land thrive better than in their native lands, have tried to explain this phenomenon by stating that there is some peculiar property of the soil, but they are wrong. That's not the explanation. It's just ordinary, LaGrange, Georgia soil. The real cause of the wonders which exist in this garden is the seventy years of love and devoted care which Mrs. Ferrell gave to the garden.

Architect Neel Reid added fountains and other statuary to the gardens when the Callaway home was built to further integrate the home with the gardens.

== Callaway Family ==
Fuller Earle Callaway (1870-1928) was born in Troup County, Georgia and was an entrepreneur from an early age, selling sundries to rural housewives and farming. At age eighteen he opened a five-and-ten-cent store and soon owned several other stores and a wholesale business. He later invested in the textile business and eventually had several businesses employing thousands of people. He married Ida Jane Cason (1872-1936) of Jewell in 1891, and they had two sons, Cason Jewell Callaway (1894-1961) and Fuller Earle Callaway Jr. (1907-1992) Both sons grew up working in and managing their father's textile mills which were sold to Deering-Milliken in 1968.

Cason married Virginia Hollis Hand (1900-1995) of Pelham in 1920 and Fuller Jr. married Virginia's younger sister, Alice Hinman Hand (1912-1998) ten years later. After retiring from the mills, Cason worked on developing better farm practices at his Blue Springs Farms near Hamilton, Georgia. He and Virginia opened Ida Cason Callaway Gardens in 1952.

Following Ida's death in 1936, her two sons, Cason and Fuller Jr. submitted sealed bids for Hills & Dales to see which one would get the family home. Fuller, Jr. worried half the night that he wouldn't get the place and the other half of the night that he would. The bids were very close, but in the end Fuller, Jr. and Alice moved into the family home. Following Alice's death in 1998, the estate was bequeathed to Fuller E. Callaway Foundation.

As the Callaways instructed, the estate became a museum for the enjoyment of the visiting public. After renovations and the addition of a visitor center, the estate opened to the public in October 2004. Extensive renovations on the second and third floor of the home were completed in April 2010 and now visitors tour all three floors of the home.
