= Harris Fawell =

American politician (1929–2021)

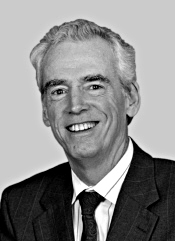

Member of the U.S. House of Representatives from Illinois's 13th district
- In office January 3, 1985 – January 3, 1999
- Preceded by: John N. Erlenborn
- Succeeded by: Judy Biggert

Member of the Illinois Senate
- In office January 1963 – January 1977
- Preceded by: Lottie Holman O'Neill
- Succeeded by: Jack E. Bowers
- Constituency: 41st district (1963–67, 1973–77); 40th district (1967–73)

Personal details
- Born: March 25, 1929 West Chicago, Illinois, U.S.
- Died: November 11, 2021 (aged 92) Naperville, Illinois, U.S.
- Party: Republican
- Spouse: Ruth Fawell
- Education: North Central College; Illinois Institute of Technology (LL.B.)

Harris Walter Fawell (March 25, 1929 – November 11, 2021) was an American lawyer and politician from Illinois who served seven terms as a Republican member of the United States House of Representatives from 1985 to 1999.

== Early life and career ==
Fawell was a graduate of West Chicago High School. He attended North Central College of Naperville from 1947 to 1949, during which time he also played baseball for the minor league affiliate of the Detroit Tigers in Greenville, South Carolina.

He received his LL.B from Chicago-Kent College of Law. Admitted to the bar in 1952, Fawell practiced law from 1954 to 1984. He served as an Assistant State Attorney for DuPage County, Illinois.

He was the brother-in-law of Beverly Fawell, who was a member of both Houses of the Illinois General Assembly.

== Illinois Senate ==
In 1958, Fawell challenged incumbent Lottie Holman O'Neill in the Republican primary to represent the 41st district in the Illinois Senate, but was unsuccessful. Four years later, he was elected to succeed her when she retired. He was a Republican member of the Illinois Senate from 1963 to 1977, and was a delegate to the Republican National Conventions in 1968 and 1988.

He prioritized preservation and expansion of local parks, resulting in some success but also provoking opposition from developers and other special interests. He was one of only two Republicans in the state senate at the time who voted in support of fair housing legislation.

== Private legal practice ==
Fawell did not run for re-election to the state senate in 1976, choosing instead to make a run for a judicial seat. In the 1976 Republican primary for the Illinois Supreme Court, Appellate Judge Thomas J. Moran defeated Fawell.

Afterwards, he returned to his private law practice, where he represented clients including municipalities and part districts.

== Congress ==
In 1984 he was elected to the U.S. House of Representatives, representing Illinois' 13th district where he served until he retired in 1999.

In Congress, he became well known for identifying and trying to eliminate what he believed was unnecessary government spending, particularly directed spending projects that he classified as "pork barrel" spending. In all, he is credited with successfully sponsoring 23 bill eliminating such congressional pet projects, which he claimed saved $2 billion in wasteful government spending. He chose not to seek re-election to an eighth term, retiring from Congress in 1999.

The Harris W. Fawell Congressional Papers are held at North Central College.

== Post-political life ==
He served on the North Central College Board of Trustees and on the Executive Council of the Chicago Metropolis 2020 of Chicago. In 2008, Fawell endorsed his home state's junior United States Senator Barack Obama for President of the United States, against his party's nominee, Arizona senator John McCain.

== Illness and death ==
Fawell died of complications from Alzheimer's disease on November 11, 2021.

U.S. House of Representatives
Preceded by John N. Erlenborn	U.S. Representative of Illinois' 13th congressional district 1985–1999	Succeeded by Judy Biggert
