= Hills and Dales, Kentucky =

- City
- Location of Hills and Dales in Jefferson County, Kentucky

- Location within the state of Kentucky Hills and Dales (the United States)
- Coordinates: 38°18′02″N 85°37′29″W
- Country: United States
- State: Kentucky
- County: Jefferson
- Incorporated: 1976

Government
  - Mayor: Andreas S.V. Wokutch

Area
  - Total: 0.10 sq mi (0.26 km^{2})
  - Land: 0.10 sq mi (0.26 km^{2})
  - Water: 0 sq mi (0.00 km^{2})
- Elevation: 600 ft (180 m)

Population (2020)
  - Total: 146
  - Density: 1,463.8/sq mi (565.18/km^{2})
- Time zone: UTC-5 (Eastern (EST))
  - Summer (DST): UTC-4 (EDT)
- ZIP Code: 40241
- FIPS code: 21-36865
- GNIS feature ID: 2404700
- Website: https://www.hillsanddales.city/

Hills and Dales is a home rule-class city in Jefferson County, Kentucky, United States. As of the 2020 census, Hills and Dales had a population of 146.

== History ==
Residents of the community of Hills and Dales filed to incorporate as a sixth-class city in September 1976 to avoid being annexed by the nearby community of Northfield.

== Geography ==
Hills and Dales is located in northeastern Jefferson County on a hill overlooking Goose Creek to the north. Interstate 71 runs along the community's southern border without direct access. U.S. Route 42 passes through the northwest corner of the community, leading southwest 9 miles (14 km) to downtown Louisville.

According to the United States Census Bureau, the city has a total area of 0.10 square miles (0.26 km^{2}), all land.

== Demographics ==
Historical population
Census	Pop.	Note	%±
1980	151		—
1990	154		2.0%
2000	153		−0.6%
2010	142		−7.2%
2020	146		2.8%
U.S. Decennial Census

As of the census of 2000, there were 153 people, 61 households, and 51 families residing in the city. The population density was 1,567.7 inhabitants per square mile (605.3/km^{2}). There were 62 housing units at an average density of 635.3 per square mile (245.3/km^{2}). The racial makeup of the city was 96.08% White, 2.61% Asian, and 1.31% from two or more races.

There were 61 households, of which 29.5% had children under 18 living with them, 83.6% were married couples living together, and 14.8% were non-families. 9.8% of all households comprised individuals, and 6.6% had someone who was 65 or older living alone. The average household size was 2.51, and the average family size was 2.69.

The city's population was spread out, with 20.3% under 18, 2.6% from 18 to 24, 18.3% from 25 to 44, 37.3% from 45 to 64, and 21.6% who were 65 or older. The median age was 52 years. For every 100 females, there were 91.3 males. For every 100 females age 18 and over, there were 93.7 males.

The median income for a household in the city was $80,773, and the median income for a family was $80,888. Males had a median income of $66,250 versus $43,000 for females. The per capita income for the city was $43,722. About 8.7% of families and 4.8% of the population were below the poverty line, including none of those under eighteen and 10.0% of those 65 or over.
