= Hill N Dale, Lexington =

Neighborhood in Lexington, Kentucky

Coordinates: 38.011°N 84.529°W

Hill N Dale is a neighborhood in southwestern Lexington, Kentucky, United States. Its boundaries are Southview Drive to the west, Cincinnati Southern railroad tracks to the east, Southland Drive to the north, and Pasadena Drive to the south.

Neighborhood statistics

- Area: 0.331 square miles (0.86 km^{2})
- Population: 988
- Population density: 2,982 people per square mile
- Median household income: $54,584
