= John McCandish King =

American politician (1927–2016)

Member of the Illinois House of Representatives from the 41st district
- In office January 1951 – January 1957
- Preceded by: Lottie Holman O'Neill
- Succeeded by: District reapportioned

Personal details
- Born: November 7, 1927 Chicago, Illinois
- Died: January 13, 2016 (aged 88) Denver, Colorado
- Party: Republican
- Children: Four
- Profession: Oil company executive Politician

John McCandish King (February 15, 1927 – January 13, 2016) was an American petroleum entrepreneur and Republican politician. He is notable for being one of the youngest members elected to the Illinois House of Representatives in its history and for his role in a fraudulent scam involving Investors Overseas Service.

== Early life ==
King was born February 15, 1927, in Chicago, Illinois. King attended three colleges, but never graduated; University of Washington, Wheaton College and Northwestern University. While a student, he was the national president of the College Republicans.

== Illinois House of Representatives ==
He was elected to the Illinois House of Representatives in 1950 to succeed Lottie Holman O'Neill who vacated the seat to successfully seek election to the Illinois Senate. He was the youngest person elected to the Illinois House of Representatives since Stephen A. Douglas. This record was later broken when Avery Bourne was appointed to the legislature in 2015. While a member of the House, he married his first wife, Carylyn Becker, whom he eventually divorced. He remarried to Mary Louise Gabriel.

In the mid-1950s, a mid-decade legislative district reapportionment split the 41st district, which included DuPage and Will counties into multiple districts. King ran in the new 36th district, but lost in a crowded primary field of sixteen candidates.

== Business career ==
King first became involved in the oil exploration industry through a $1,500 investment in the efforts of an Oklahoma friend. After leaving the Illinois House, he entered the industry full-time, first at King-Stevenson Oil Company in Chicago and later forming King Resources in Denver, Colorado.

In 1966, King began to sell two hedge funds, Imperial American and Royal Resources, through his Colorado Corporation. King Resources was a customer of the funds. The sale of these drilling funds to others increased King's profits tenfold. By 1969, the company had 7 million barrels of crude oil and 258 billion cubic feet of natural gas in American and Canadian developed reserves. At this point, the firm was involved in mining operations as well as drilling operations. Activities included oil exploration in the North Sea, molybdenum exploration near Revelstoke, British Columbia and iron ore exploration in Quebec.

In 1970, the bubble burst and King Resources lost $53 million in a month, cut staff in half and King resigned from his roles in the company. That year, he went to Europe in an attempt to salvage the failing Investors Overseas Service. He failed and King went bankrupt.

King was named in a tongue-in-cheek Cervi's Journal article, nominating him as a 1971 Denver Man of The Year for "his originality and ground-breaking efforts in showing how the wealthy can cut their cost of living."

In 1976, King and Boucher were charged after an attempt to defraud 150,000 shareholders of IOS with fraudulent valuations of Arctic oil and gas permits. King was sentenced to one year in prison for fraud.

== Other political activities ==
For a time, he was the vice-chairman of the Republican National Committee's Finance Committee. During the 1968 U.S. presidential election, King donated $750,000 to the presidential campaign of Richard Nixon. This relationship continued into Nixon's administration. King suggested the idea of the Nixon administration diverting money directly to congressional candidates, rather than going through the usual political channels. This suggestion led to the illegal fundraising operation of Harry S. Dent Sr. and Dent's subsequent conviction. Nixon appointed King his personal representative, with the rank of Ambassador, to the 1970 Japan World Expo.

In the 1974 United States Senate elections, he ran for the United States Senate in Colorado as an independent candidate. He received approximately 2% of the vote.

== Death ==
King died January 13, 2016, in Denver, Colorado. He was survived by his wife, his four children and his ex-wife.
