= Mary Estill Buchanan =

American politician

30th Secretary of State of Colorado
- In office March 21, 1974 – January 11, 1983
- Governor: John D. Vanderhoof; Richard Lamm
- Preceded by: Bryon Anderson
- Succeeded by: Natalie Meyer

Personal details
- Born: November 15, 1934 (age 91) San Francisco, California, U.S.
- Party: Republican
- Education: Wellesley College (BA); Harvard University (MBA)

Mary Estill Buchanan (born November 15, 1934) is an American politician who served as the Secretary of State of Colorado from 1974 to 1983. She was the Republican nominee for U.S. Senator from Colorado in 1980, but was narrowly defeated by incumbent Gary Hart.

Party political offices
Preceded by Peter H. Dominick	Republican nominee for U.S. Senator from Colorado (Class 3); 1980	Succeeded by Ken Kramer
