= Legal dispute over incorporation of St. George, Louisiana =

Broome vs. Rials
- Court: Louisiana Supreme Court
- Full case name: Mayor-President Sharon Weston Broome, Lewis O. Unglesby, and M.E. Cormier vs. Chris Rials and Norman Browning, Organizers of the Petition to Incorporate St. George
- Decided: April 26, 2024

Case history
- Prior action: 19th Judicial Court ruled in favor of Broome on May 31, 2022
- Appealed from: Louisiana First Circuit Court of Appeal ruled in favor of Broome on July 14, 2023

Case opinions
- "Voters approved the incorporation. A challenge was filed, and the lower courts denied incorporation. We find legal error, review the matter de novo, reverse the denial of incorporation, and render judgment in favor of the incorporators and electors."
- Decision by: Justice William J. Crain
- Dissent: Chief Justice John L. Weimer; Justice Crichton; Justice Piper D. Griffin

The incorporation of St. George in East Baton Rouge Parish became the focus of a years-long court battle over whether the new municipality met Louisiana's legal requirements for incorporation. After voters approved the proposal in 2019, opponents of the incorporation, including Mayor-President Sharon Weston Broome, fought for St. George to remain unincorporated, claiming the petition was incomplete and that the city would be unable to provide essential services. Two lower courts, the 19th Judicial District Court and the Louisiana First Circuit Court of Appeal, agreed and blocked the incorporation. On April 26, 2024, the Louisiana Supreme Court reversed those rulings in a 4–3 decision, finding that St. George could reasonably operate as a city. The decision permitted incorporation to move forward.

== Incorporation efforts ==
East Baton Rouge Parish Louisiana incorporated and unincorporated areas Village St. George highlighted

In 2012 and again in 2013, local organizers sought approval from the state legislature to form a new school district but were unsuccessful. In June 2015, those organizers attempted to form a new city called St. George, but failed to collect enough signatures for the petition, falling 71 short of the minimum 17,859 required; signatures from at least 25 percent of electors residing in the area were needed. Consequently, an election could not be called. The formation of a new city was viewed as a pathway to forming a new school district, which would require approval from the state legislature and from voters at the state level and in East Baton Rouge Parish.

In October 2018, St. George organizers submitted a second petition to form a new city. This petition proposed a smaller city that included some of the same area.

In February 2019, the East Baton Rouge Parish Registrar of Voters declared that the petition had enough valid signatures (at least 12,996 required, 14,585 accepted) to meet the requirements for eligibility. In March 2019, Louisiana Gov. John Bel Edwards authorized adding the petition to the October 12, 2019, ballot.

Of the more than 54,000 registered voters living in the St. George area, approximately 32,293 (60%) cast ballots, with 17,422 (54%) voting in favor of incorporation.

However, before the governor could appoint an interim mayor and interim city council, a legal action was filed to contest the incorporation.

On June 12, 2020, Governor John Bel Edwards signed SB243, authored by Senator Bodi White and Representative Rick Edmonds, into law as Act 361 of the 2020 Regular Session of the Louisiana Legislature. The St. George Transition District creates a framework for the transition of taxing authority and services from East Baton Rouge Parish to the City of St. George.

According to the Act, the St. George Transition District would not be granted the proper authority until the lawsuit challenging the incorporation of the City of St. George was proven unsuccessful.

== Legal proceedings ==
Relief sought by the plaintiffs included a favorable judgment denying the incorporation of St. George, or, alternatively, a parish-wide election to determine if the Plan of Government should be amended to allow for the formation of a new city. Plaintiffs also requested that the court hold defendants responsible for the costs of litigation.

=== 19th Judicial Court ===
The ruling by the 19th Judicial Court on May 31, 2022, was based on state law governing "Legal action contesting an incorporation":

If the district court determines that the provisions of this Subpart have not been complied with, that the proposed municipality will not be able to provide the public services proposed in the petition within a reasonable period of time, or that the incorporation is unreasonable, the district court shall enter an order denying the incorporation.

— La. R.S. 33:4(E)(2)(a)

The judgment addressed many issues in the trial, including:

- Whether the municipality can in all probability provide the proposed public services within a reasonable period of time. The Court ruled that "the Incorporators, if properly funded, could in all probability provide some of the proposed public services within a reasonable period of time.... However, it is doubtful that [the other services listed in the petition for incorporation] can be provided without increasing taxes.... Their petition did condition the providing of some services if funds were available." (pp. 6–7)
- Whether the incorporation of St. George is reasonable. "Based on the evidence, the City of St. George would run a deficit of approximately $3 million on day one and this excludes the additional cost of the Sheriff. This deficit will be a huge negative on the City of St. George. St. George is required to run a balanced budget and because of this deficit there would be layoffs and a reduction in public services" (p. 8)
- Whether the Incorporation may adversely impact other municipalities in the vicinity. The Court determined that "If St. George were to incorporate, the [Baton Rouge municipal budget] general fund would further be reduced by $48 million[,] leaving the City of Baton Rouge with a 45% cut in its budget." $51 million represents only a 4.95% reduction in the total budget, and only a 15.47% reduction in the 329.5 million dollar general fund listed.) (p. 9).

=== Louisiana First Circuit Court of Appeal ===
The First Circuit Court ruling on July 14, 2023, included the following judgements:

- Insufficient plan. "We affirm the June 13, 2022 judgment of the trial court denying the incorporation," the First Circuit Court said, "because the petition failed to comply with the requirements of La. R.S. 33:1(A)(4)." (p. 25) This section includes the following requirement: A listing of the public services the municipal corporation proposes to render to the area and a plan for the provision of these services. The court said that "although the petition listed the services that would be provided, the petition did not provide ... a plan for the provision of those services." (p. 25) The court also held that a statement in the petition that "services will be provided subject to the availability of funds derived from taxes, license fees, permits, and other revenue which becomes available to the municipality and are authorized by state law' does not constitute a plan for the provision of those services as required by La. R.S. 33:1." (p. 25)
- Lack of standing. The court determined that two of the plaintiffs did not have standing, and were dismissed from the lawsuit. Mayor-President Sharon Weston Broome, according to the court, was not an elected official of the governing authority; therefore, lacked standing. (pp. 2 and 25). The court also determined that Baton Rouge resident, M.E. Cormier lacked standing, citing her residency outside of the proposed city limits did not give her an actual interest, nor would she be adversely affected by the incorporation of St. George. (p. 4)
- Dismissal of other issues. Because the petition was deemed to be out of compliance with the requirements, the court held that any discussion of other issues ("including the alleged unreasonableness of the incorporation and the alleged adverse impact on the City of Baton Rouge") would not be considered (p. 25).

A spokesman for the City of St. George said the matter would be appealed to the Louisiana Supreme Court.

=== Louisiana State Supreme Court ===
The Supreme Court ruling on April 26, 2024, affirmed the incorporation of the City of St. George in a 4–3 decision. This ruling directly addressed the issues of Baton Rouge in the following points:

- Does incorporation affect an existing city within three miles? "Also, the statute does not limit the adverse impact factor to economics. Evidence shows that Baton Rouge can actually be positively affected by St. George's growing population. Those people and their money will stay in the parish. This increases revenues and improves quality of life across the parish. This factor favors incorporation."
- Will incorporation affect the interest of landowners in the affected area? "Landowners and residents of St. George will benefit by their sales tax revenue being used on needs specific to St. George. Again, because of the nature of the consolidated City-Parish government, Baton Rouge has arguably experienced a windfall by collecting taxes in St. George without returning proportionate money and services. Incorporation will allow the money paid by St. George citizens to stay in St. George. This factor favors incorporation."
- Is the cost of operating the municipality prohibitive? "This factor is previously analyzed under the ability to provide public services within a reasonable period of time. We find St. George's revenue will cover its operating costs. This factor favors incorporation."

The concluding statement of the courts' opinion included the following statement:

"Despite the challenge, we conclude St. George can provide public services within a reasonable period of time. Applying objective factors to determine reasonableness, we hold incorporation is reasonable. We reverse the lower courts’ denial of incorporation and render judgment in favor of Proponents."
