= St. Michael the Archangel High School (St. George, Louisiana) =

Private school in Louisiana, United States

Location
- 17521 Monitor Avenue; Baton Rouge, East Baton Rouge Parish, Louisiana 70817; United States; 30°24′36″N 90°59′23″W

Information
- Type: Private, Coeducational
- Religious affiliation: Roman Catholic
- Established: 1984 (as Bishop Sullivan High School)
- Principal: Jared Cavalier
- Chaplain: Joseph Bresowar, Albert Blount
- Faculty: 75
- Grades: 9–12
  - Grade 9: 157
  - Grade 10: 199
  - Grade 11: 170
  - Grade 12: 164
- Colors: Red, Gray and Black
- Team name: Warriors
- Rival: Woodlawn Panthers
- Accreditation: Southern Association of Colleges and Schools
- Dean of Students: Kegan Keller
- Activities Director: Jackie Moseley
- Website: http://www.smhsbr.org

St. Michael the Archangel Diocesan Regional High School is a private, Roman Catholic high school in City of St. George, Louisiana, United States, east of the city of Baton Rouge. It is located in the Roman Catholic Diocese of Baton Rouge.

== History ==
Established in 1984 by the Catholic Diocese of Baton Rouge as Bishop Joseph V. Sullivan Diocesan Regional High School, the name was changed to St. Michael the Archangel Diocesan Regional High School in 2005 due to sexual abuse allegations against its namesake —— Bishop Joseph Sullivan. The school is located in the South Central Deanery on 63 acres in White Oak Subdivision, and is surrounded by protected wetlands under the auspices of the school. Staffed by a faculty of religious laymen and women, the school is accredited by the Louisiana State Board of Elementary & Secondary education and by the Southern Association of Colleges and Schools. Operational guidelines are based on the administrator’s handbook for the State of Louisiana.

Previously it was in Shenandoah, a census-designated place in unincorporated East Baton Rouge Parish, St. George began its jurisdiction on April 26, 2024, and so the school is now in the city limits of St. George.

== Athletics ==
St. Michael the Archangel High athletics competes in the LHSAA.

=== Championships ===
- Boys Cross Country- 2007 - 2008 4A State Champions
- Girls Basketball- 2007-2008 4A State Champions
- Girls Cross Country- 2007-2008 4A State Champions
- Wrestling 2009-2010 Division II State Champions

== Notable alumni ==
- Jacob Evans, NBA Shooting Guard - Golden State Warriors
- Carley Ann McCord, Sports broadcaster and journalist
- Julius Warmsley, NFL Defensive End - Seattle Seahawks
