= LSU Hilltop Arboretum =

Arboretum in Baton Rouge, Louisiana, US

Coordinates: 30.35636°N 91.09486°W

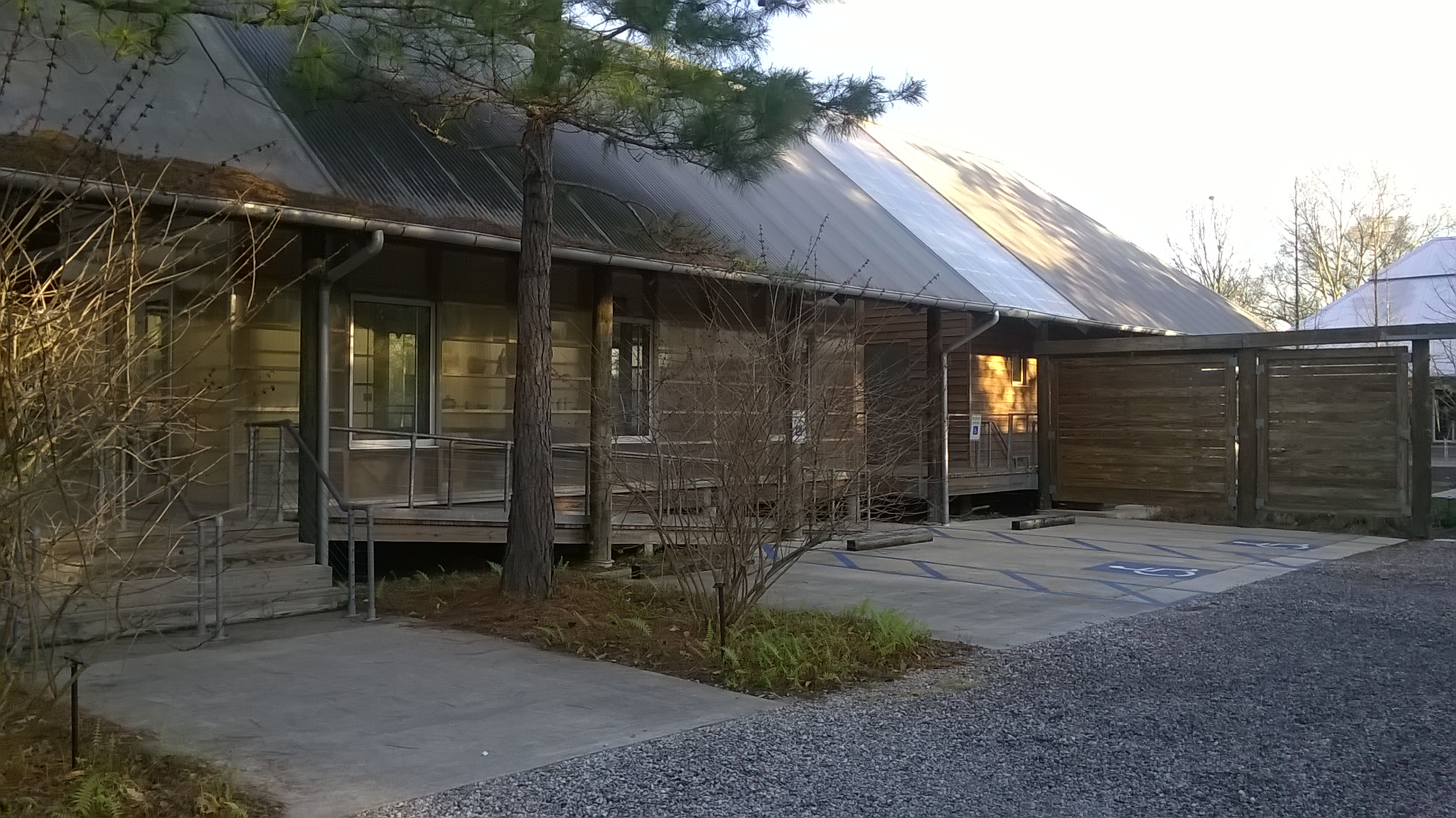
- LSU Hilltop Arboretum, Main Building
- Interactive map of LSU Hilltop Arboretum
- Location: St. George, Louisiana, United States
- Website: www.lsu.edu/hilltop/index.php

The Hilltop Arboretum at Louisiana State University (14 acres) is an arboretum owned by the Louisiana State University. It is located at 11855 Highland Road, St. George, Louisiana (Baton Rouge postal address), and open to the public free of charge during daylight hours seven days a week.

The arboretum was developed by Mr. and Mrs. Emory Smith, starting in 1929, and donated to the university in 1981. The Smiths planned the garden to follow the form of a cathedral: "It had a central great hall or nave, and from that – in every direction – ran hallways leading to other rooms and on to others, with niches and passageways of every description. The nave and other rooms were the grassy plots; the walls were trees, shrubs, and bamboo; the pillars were old tree trunks."

The arboretum collection includes bamboo, beech, birch, black cherry, black walnut, box elder, buckeye, camellia, cherry laurel, cow oak, clethra, crape myrtle, cypress, dogwood, elm, fig, Formosan gum, green hawthorn, hickory, hop hornbeam, holly, illicium, ironwood, Japanese maple, Justicia, ligustrum, magnolia, live oak, loquat, pecan, persimmon, pine, red maple, red oak, sassafras, sawtooth oak, short leaf pine, silver bell, silver maple, sourwood, spruce pine, sugar maple, sweet gum, sweet olive, sycamore, tulip tree, viburnum, vaccinium, water oak, and yaupon.

== History ==
Previously it was in the Oak Hills Place census-designated place in unincorporated East Baton Rouge Parish. St. George's city jurisdiction came into effect on April 26, 2024 after a court decision, and so the arboretum is now in St. George.

== Gallery ==
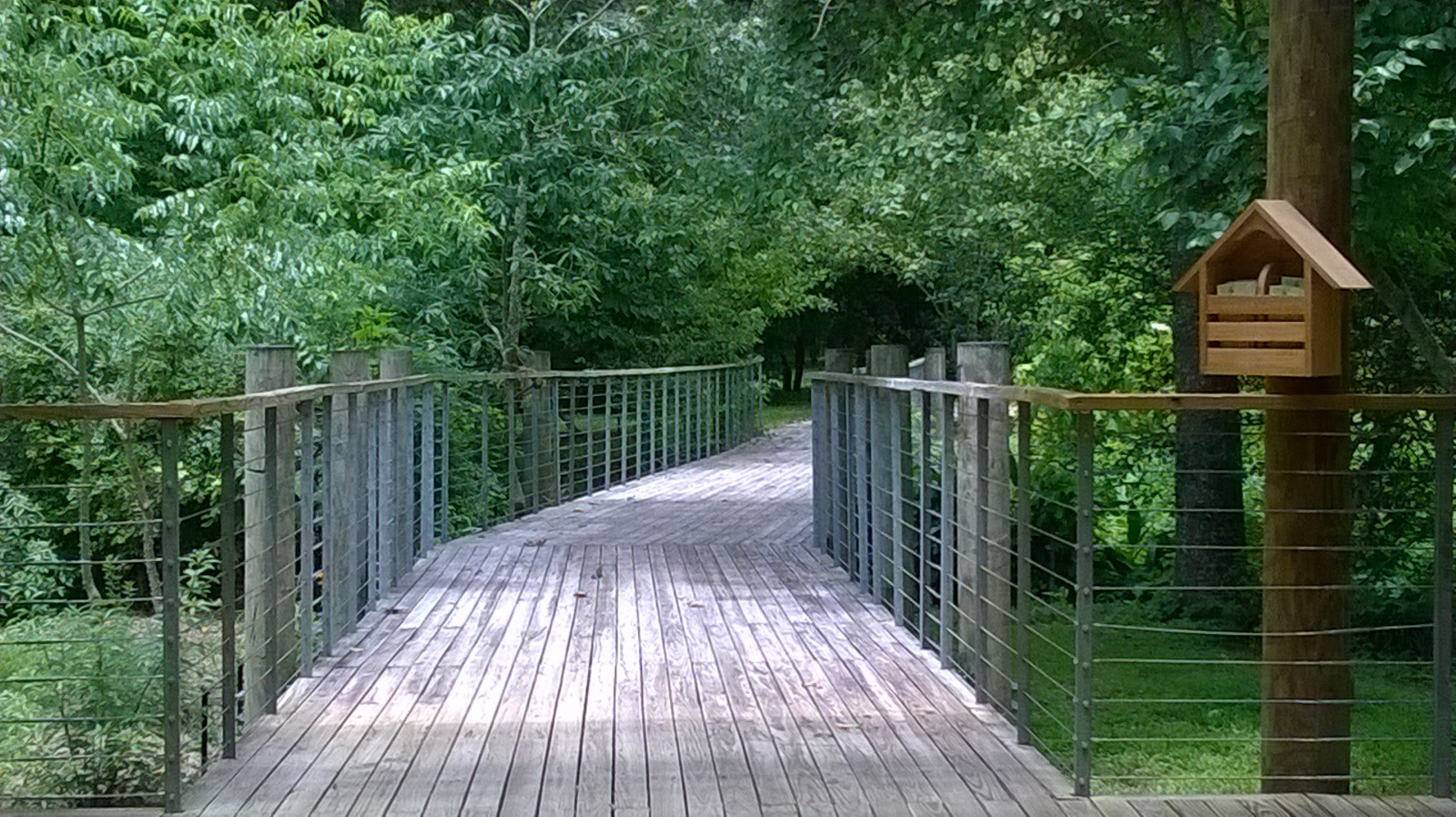
Boardwalk

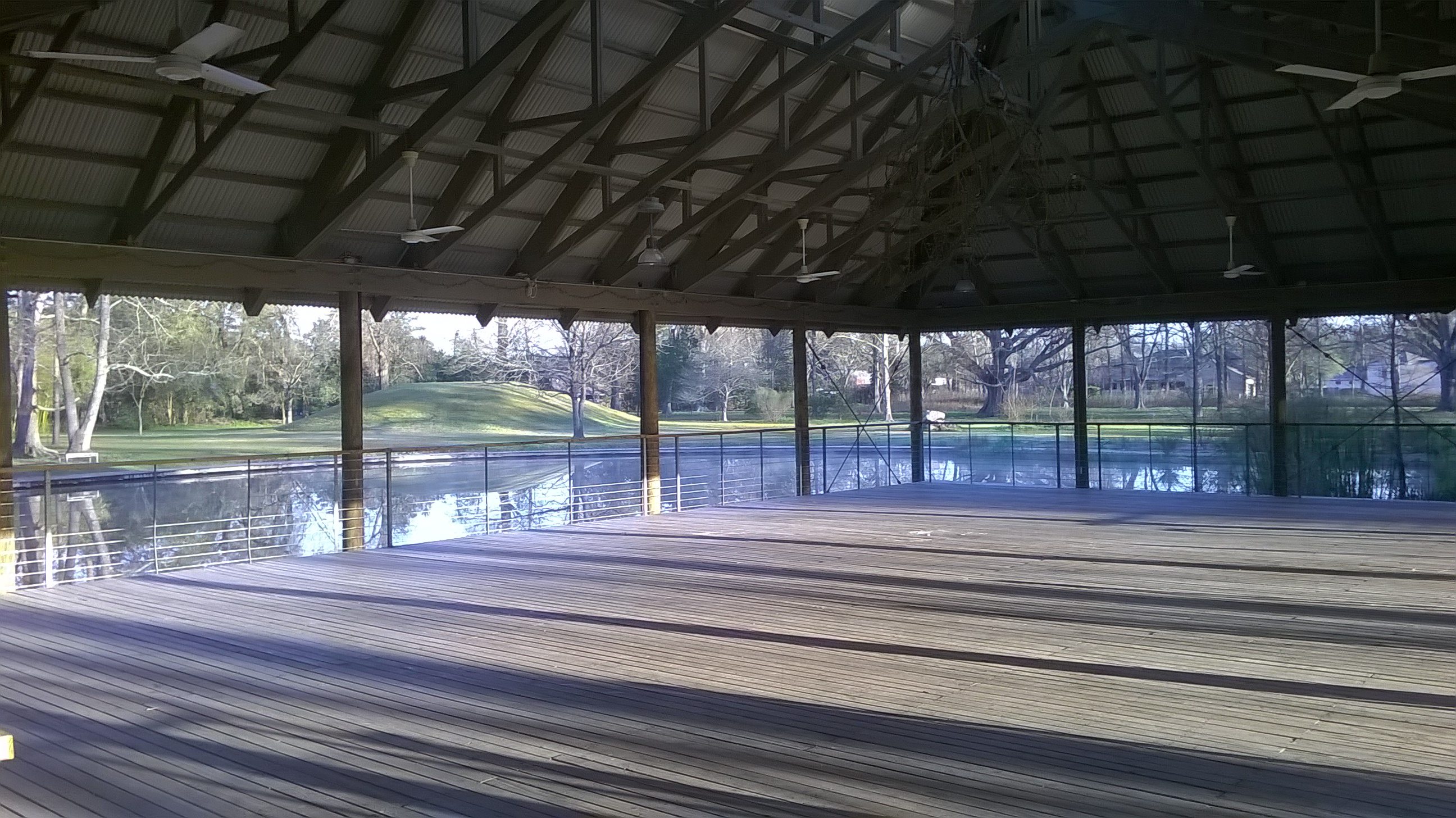
Pavilion

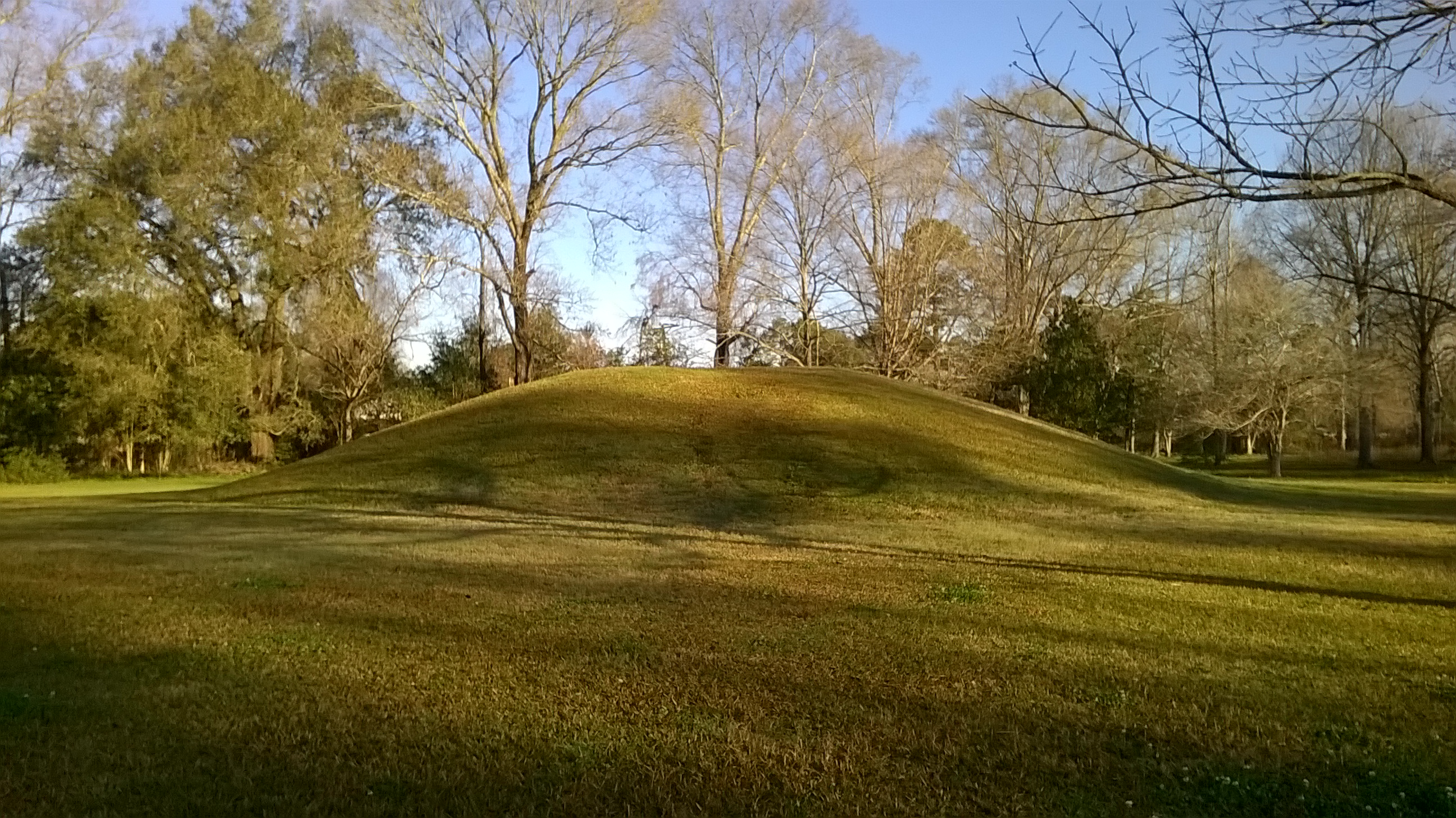
Midden (Mound soil now relocated to form amphitheater)

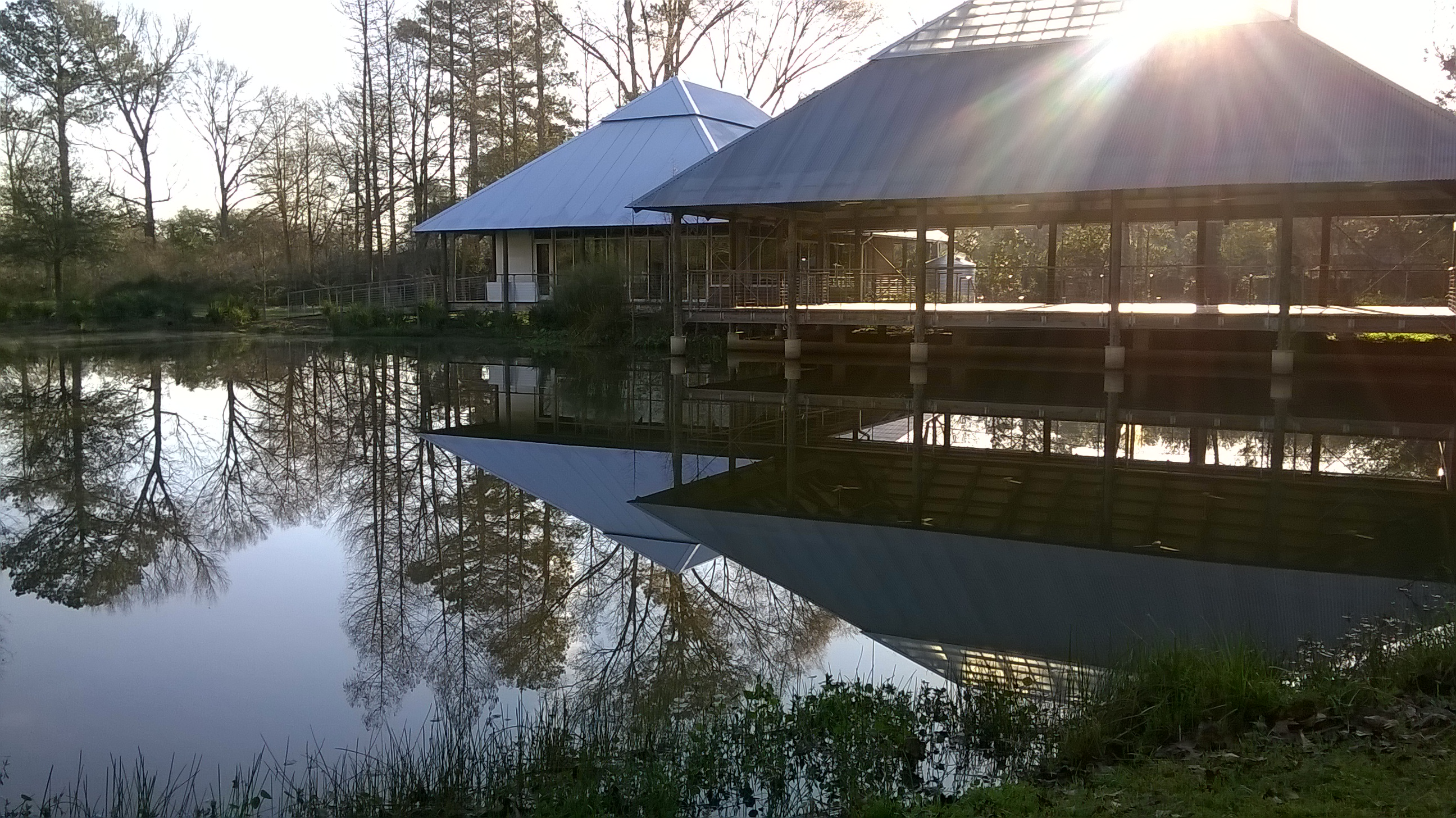
Pond

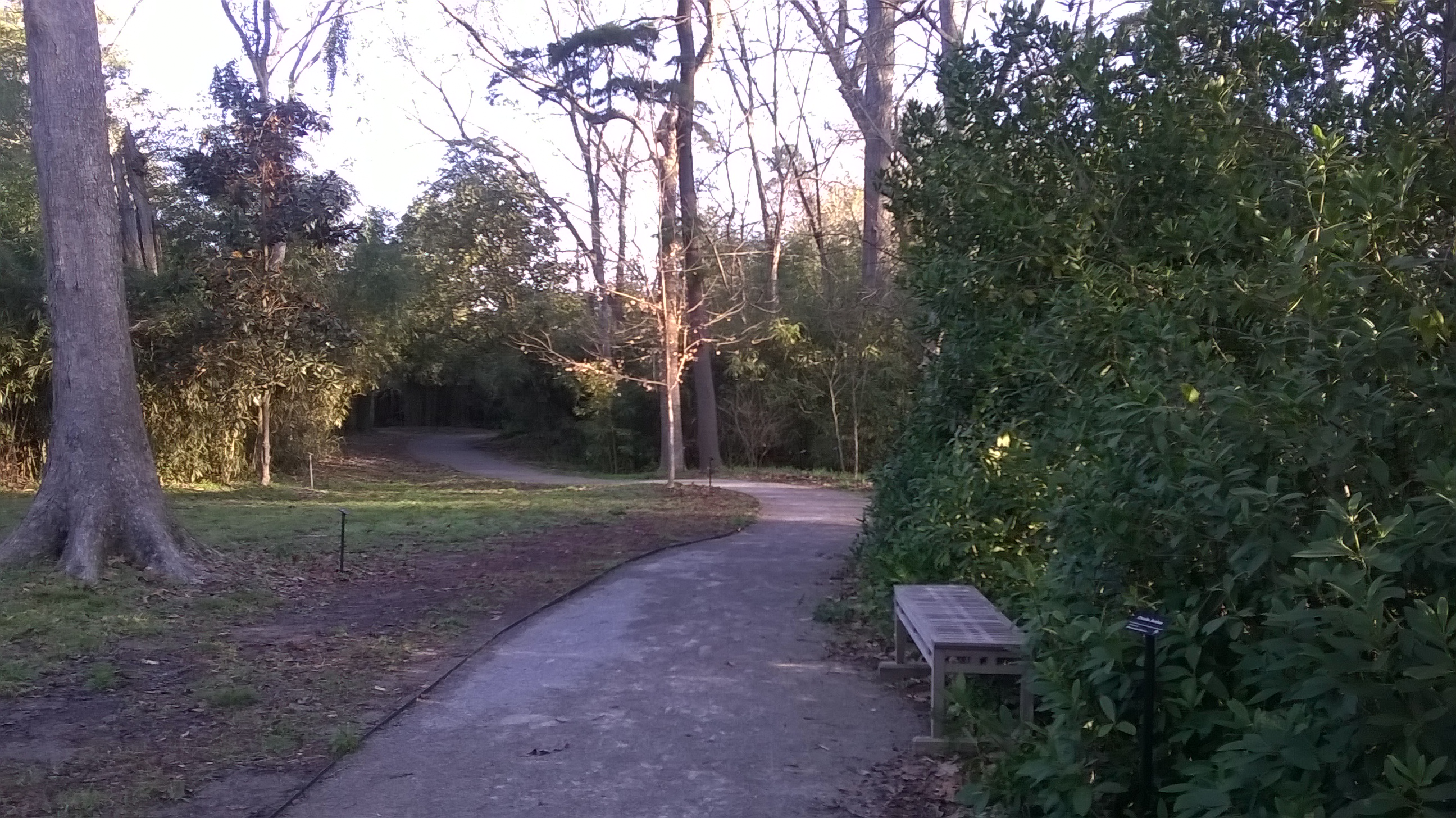
Trail

== See also ==
- List of botanical gardens in the United States
