= George Floyd protests in Louisiana =

2020 civil unrest after the murder of George Floyd

- Part of George Floyd protests
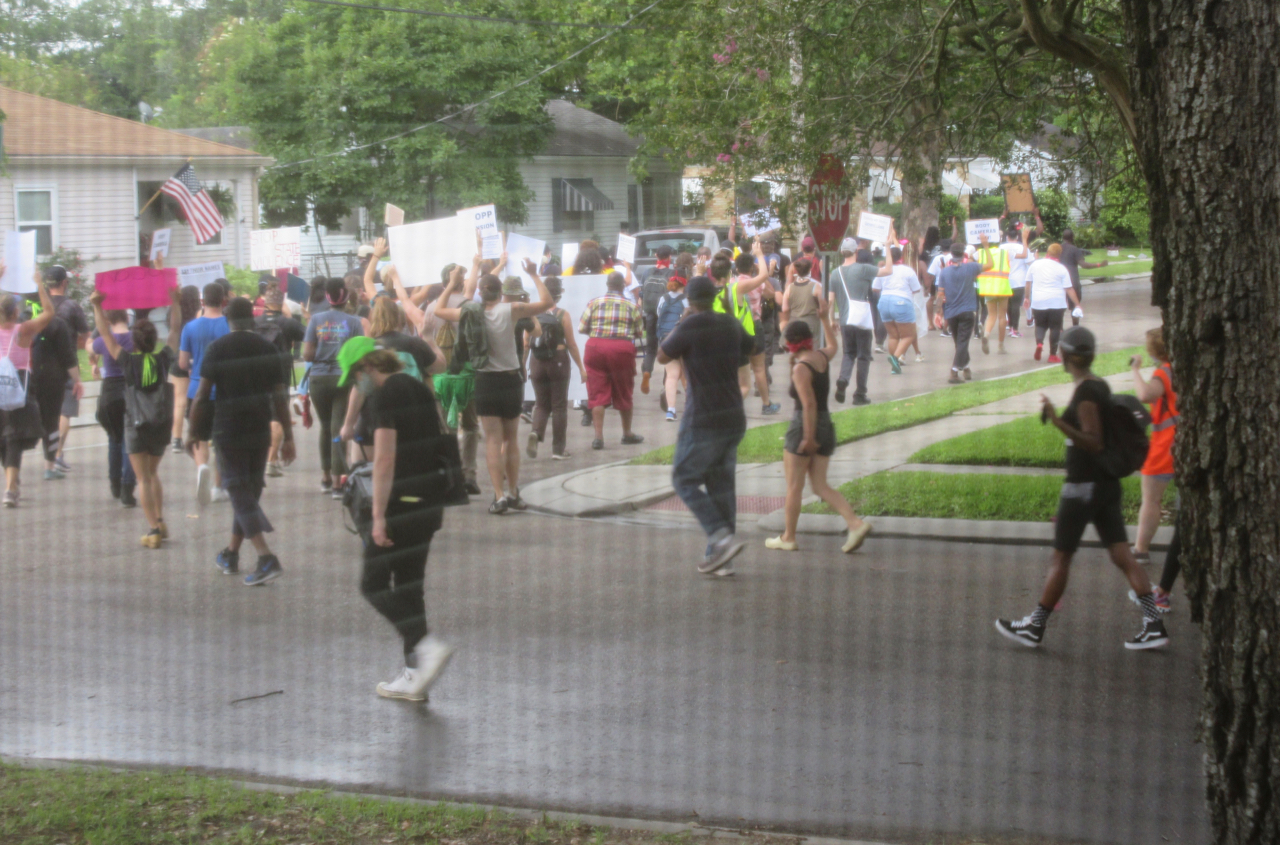
- Protesters in Old Jefferson on June 6
- Date: May 28 – September 2020 (3 months and 4 days)
- Location: Louisiana, United States
- Caused by: Police brutality; Institutional racism against African Americans; Reaction to the murder of George Floyd; Economic, racial and social inequality

Cities in Louisiana in which a protest with about 100 or more participants was held

This is a list of George Floyd protests in Louisiana, United States.

== Locations ==
=== Alexandria ===
On May 31, dozens of protesters walked peacefully through downtown Alexandria chanting for "justice, peace, and equality." On June 2, another crowd held a protest at the Rapides Parish Courthouse, and on June 3, several hundred protesters marched to the Alexandria Public Safety Complex.

=== Baton Rouge ===
On May 30, a vigil was held at a church. May 31: hundreds marched to the Louisiana State Capitol building. Additional protests took place on Siegen Lane on the evenings of May 31, June 1, and June 2.

=== Houma ===
On May 31, 66 protesters gathered at the Terrebonne Courthouse Square and peacefully demonstrated against police killings for three hours.

=== Lafayette ===
On May 31, several hundred people peacefully protested at a rally held at the corner of University Avenue and Johnston Street by the campus of the University of Louisiana at Lafayette. After listening to speeches in Girard Hall, the crowd lined the sidewalks for a demonstration before marching to the Lafayette police station at the end of University Avenue.

=== Lake Charles ===
On May 31, about 300 people attended a peaceful protest rally at the corner of Broad Street and Enterprise Boulevard.

=== Metairie ===
On June 12, around two dozen people marched to the Jefferson Parish Sheriff's Office to protest police brutality.

=== Monroe ===
On May 31, hundreds of people gathered peacefully for a rally at the Monroe Civic Center, organized by the local NAACP chapter. After hearing some speeches, about half of the attendees left on an unplanned march through the downtown area and in front of the Ouachita Parish Courthouse.

=== New Iberia ===
On May 30, a small, peaceful protest took place in the evening at the corner of Lombard and Hopkins Streets.

=== New Orleans ===
- May 29: about 50 people protested at the intersection of North Claiborne and Esplanade Avenues; the demonstration continued for several hours.
- May 30: three separate demonstrations took place: the first at the same North Claiborne and Esplanade Avenues location, the second one at noon which had over 1,000 people peacefully protest and march to the police headquarters, and the third and final occurred at Duncan Plaza with equal numbers to the noon really.
- May 31: around 100 gathered to pray and stand in solidarity.
- June 2: Hundreds of protesters blocked I-10 near Canal Street. The police broadcast supportive messages on a megaphone. The protests were declared peaceful for three days in a row.
- June 3: Hundreds of protesters walked up the Crescent City Connection and met a police blockade stopping the protests from crossing the river. After an hour and warnings to remove themselves, the NOPD eventually shot tear gas and rubber balls on the protesters, which included children.
- June 5: Thousands of protesters gathered at Jackson Square in support of #BlackLivesMatters, calls to defund the police, end U.S. imperialism and Capitalism, and demanded the removal of the statue of Andrew Jackson, citing his Native American removal policies.
- June 6: Despite the concerns of Tropical Storm Cristobal, hundreds of protesters met at City Park to demand justice for George Floyd and against police brutality and marched down Esplanade Avenue to the First District Police Station and the site of the collapsed Hard Rock Hotel.
- June–September, 2020: The Kneeling for 9 Minutes movement has held nightly vigils at 6pm every night since June in several locations. As of September 1st, the group was kneeling at Oak Street at Carrollton Avenue (6 p.m. daily), Magazine Street at Napoleon Avenue (6 p.m. daily), 4527 Annette St. (6 p.m. daily), 2372 St. Claude Ave. (6 p.m. daily), the Riverfront at Woldenberg Park in the Central Business District (every Friday at 6 p.m.), Bonnabel Boulevard at Metairie Road (every Sunday at 6 p.m.). The nightly vigils are scheduled to continue through the November presidential election with future discussions planned surrounding how the groups will move forward with advocacy afterwards, whether in the same and/or different forms.

=== Shreveport ===
On Sunday, May 31, 300 to 500 people marched from the Shreveport Police Department headquarters to the Caddo Parish District Courthouse, where they listened to several speakers before marching back to the starting place. The protest was peaceful, and Shreveport police escorted the marchers on their route, closing off side streets as the marchers passed by.

=== Winnsboro ===
On June 4, a peaceful protest took place across the street from the Winnsboro Police Department. The event was organized by the activist groups Project Change and Citizens for Change.
