= Village St. George, Louisiana =

- Neighborhood of St. George; Former census designated place
- Location in East Baton Rouge Parish and the state of Louisiana.
- Coordinates: 30°21′46″N 91°04′05″W
- Country: United States
- State: Louisiana
- Parish: East Baton Rouge

Area
  - Total: 2.23 sq mi (5.78 km^{2})
  - Land: 2.23 sq mi (5.78 km^{2})
  - Water: 0 sq mi (0.00 km^{2})
- Elevation: 36 ft (11 m)

Population (2020)
  - Total: 7,677
  - Density: 3,438.4/sq mi (1,327.57/km^{2})
- Time zone: UTC-6 (CST)
  - Summer (DST): UTC-5 (CDT)
- ZIP code: 70810
- Area code: 225
- FIPS code: 22-78680

Village St. George is a neighborhood of St. George and former census designated place in East Baton Rouge Parish, Louisiana, United States. As of the 2020 census, Village St. George had a population of 7,677. It is part of the Baton Rouge Metropolitan Statistical Area.

It is located within the city of St. George, Louisiana.

== Geography ==
Village St. George is located in southern East Baton Rouge Parish at 30°21′46″N 91°4′5″W (30.362642, -91.068049). It is bordered to the west, across Siegen Lane, by Oak Hills Place. Downtown Baton Rouge is 10 miles (16 km) to the northwest.

According to the United States Census Bureau, the CDP has a total area of 2.2 square miles (5.8 km^{2}), all land.

== Demographics ==
Historical population
Census	Pop.	Note	%±
1990	6,242		—
2000	6,993		12.0%
2010	7,104		1.6%
2020	7,677		8.1%
U.S. Decennial Census; 1960 1970 1980; 1990 2000 2010

Village St. George was first listed as a census designated place in the 1990 U.S. census. It was deleted after the 2020 U.S. census after being absorbed into the newly formed city of St. George.

Village St. George, Louisiana – Racial and ethnic composition Note: the US Census treats Hispanic/Latino as an ethnic category. This table excludes Latinos from the racial categories and assigns them to a separate category. Hispanics/Latinos may be of any race.
Race / Ethnicity (NH = Non-Hispanic)	Pop 2000	Pop 2010	Pop 2020	% 2000	% 2010	% 2020
White alone (NH)	4,827	4,164	4,190	69.03%	58.61%	54.58%
Black or African American alone (NH)	1,647	2,175	2,148	23.55%	30.62%	27.98%
Native American or Alaska Native alone (NH)	12	8	4	0.17%	0.11%	0.05%
Asian alone (NH)	182	217	308	2.60%	3.05%	4.01%
Native Hawaiian or Pacific Islander alone (NH)	1	1	0	0.01%	0.01%	0.00%
Other race alone (NH)	8	17	37	0.11%	0.24%	0.48%
Mixed race or Multiracial (NH)	84	98	241	1.20%	1.38%	3.14%
Hispanic or Latino (any race)	232	424	749	3.32%	5.97%	9.76%
Total	6,993	7,104	7,677	100.00%	100.00%	100.00%

As of the 2020 United States census, there were 7,677 people, 2,635 households, and 1,886 families residing in the CDP.

As of the census of 2000, there were 6,993 people, 2,570 households, and 1,888 families residing in the CDP. The population density was 3,150.3 inhabitants per square mile (1,216.3/km^{2}). There were 2,646 housing units at an average density of 1,192.0 per square mile (460.2/km^{2}). The racial makeup of the CDP was 71.37% White, 23.68% African American, 0.19% Native American, 2.62% Asian, 0.01% Pacific Islander, 0.53% from other races, and 1.60% from two or more races. Hispanic or Latino of any race were 3.32% of the population.

There were 2,570 households, out of which 42.1% had children under the age of 18 living with them, 56.1% were married couples living together, 13.9% had a female householder with no husband present, and 26.5% were non-families. 20.9% of all households were made up of individuals, and 3.6% had someone living alone who was 65 years of age or older. The average household size was 2.72 and the average family size was 3.20.

In the CDP, the population was spread out, with 29.8% under the age of 18, 9.4% from 18 to 24, 34.0% from 25 to 44, 22.2% from 45 to 64, and 4.6% who were 65 years of age or older. The median age was 32 years. For every 100 females, there were 91.5 males. For every 100 females age 18 and over, there were 86.3 males.

The median income for a household in the CDP was $55,646, and the median income for a family was $64,255. Males had a median income of $48,333 versus $30,189 for females. The per capita income for the CDP was $25,742. About 5.3% of families and 6.7% of the population were below the poverty line, including 8.7% of those under age 18 and 14.8% of those age 65 or over.

== Education ==
East Baton Rouge Parish Public Schools serves Village St. George.

Zoned schools are as follows: Most of the community is served by Wildwood Elementary School. Some parts of northern Village St. George are zoned to Jefferson Terrace Elementary in Inniswold, and a small portion to the northwest is zoned to Westminster Elementary School in Westminster. Most of the area is served by Kenilworth Middle School, while Woodlawn Middle School serves a section in the north. As of 2016 Kenilworth is under the administration of the Recovery School District of Louisiana, and the portion of the Kenilworth zone which houses most of the CDP has Woodlawn Middle School, directly controlled by EBR Schools, as an option. Residents are served by Woodlawn High School in Old Jefferson.
