= Shenandoah, Louisiana =

- Neighborhood of St. George; Former census designated place
- Location in East Baton Rouge Parish and the state of Louisiana.
- Coordinates: 30°24′05″N 91°00′16″W
- Country: United States
- State: Louisiana
- Parish: East Baton Rouge

Area
  - Total: 6.25 sq mi (16.19 km^{2})
  - Land: 6.20 sq mi (16.05 km^{2})
  - Water: 0.054 sq mi (0.14 km^{2})
- Elevation 0.45: 39 ft (12 m)

Population (2020)
  - Total: 19,292
  - Density: 3,112.5/sq mi (1,201.76/km^{2})
- Time zone: UTC-6 (CST)
  - Summer (DST): UTC-5 (CDT)
- Area code: 225
- FIPS code: 22-69225

Shenandoah is a neighborhood of St. George and former census designated place in East Baton Rouge Parish, Louisiana, United States. It is part of the Baton Rouge Metropolitan Statistical Area. As of the 2020 census, Shenandoah had a population of 19,292. Shenandoah consists of a number of residential subdivisions, including Shenandoah Estates, Shenandoah Park, White Oak Landing, White Oak Estates, The Woods and The Lake at White Oak.

It is now within the city limits city of St. George.

== Geography ==
Shenandoah is located in southeastern East Baton Rouge Parish at 30°24′5″N 91°0′16″W (30.401391, -91.004412). It is bordered to the west by Baton Rouge and to the south by Old Jefferson. Louisiana Highway 73, Old Jefferson Highway, touches the southwest corner of Shenandoah and leads northwest 11 miles (18 km) to downtown Baton Rouge.

According to the United States Census Bureau, the Shenandoah CDP has a total area of 6.3 square miles (16.2 km^{2}), of which 6.2 square miles (16.1 km^{2}) is land and 0.04 square miles (0.1 km^{2}), or 0.76%, is water.

== Demographics ==
Historical population
Census	Pop.	Note	%±
1990	13,429		—
2000	17,070		27.1%
2010	18,399		7.8%
2020	19,292		4.9%
U.S. Decennial Census; 1960 1970 1980; 1990 2000 2010

Shenandoah was first listed as a census designated place in the 1990 U.S. census. It was deleted after the 2000 U.S. census after being absorbed into the newly formed city of St. George.

Shenandoah, Louisiana – Racial and ethnic composition Note: the US Census treats Hispanic/Latino as an ethnic category. This table excludes Latinos from the racial categories and assigns them to a separate category. Hispanics/Latinos may be of any race.
Race / Ethnicity (NH = Non-Hispanic)	Pop 2000	Pop 2010	Pop 2020	% 2000	% 2010	% 2020
White alone (NH)	15,528	14,821	13,161	90.97%	80.55%	68.22%
Black or African American alone (NH)	749	2,056	3,292	4.39%	11.17%	17.06%
Native American or Alaska Native alone (NH)	40	49	23	0.23%	0.27%	0.12%
Asian alone (NH)	355	643	957	2.08%	3.49%	4.96%
Native Hawaiian or Pacific Islander alone (NH)	2	12	6	0.01%	0.07%	0.03%
Other race alone (NH)	11	33	71	0.06%	0.18%	0.37%
Mixed race or Multiracial (NH)	109	207	678	0.64%	1.13%	3.51%
Hispanic or Latino (any race)	276	578	1,104	1.62%	3.14%	5.72%
Total	17,070	18,399	19,292	100.00%	100.00%	100.00%

As of the 2020 United States census, there were 19,292 people, 7,346 households, and 5,628 families residing in the CDP.

As of the census of 2000, there were 17,070 people, 5,911 households, and 4,900 families residing in the CDP. The population density was 2,728.3 inhabitants per square mile (1,053.4/km^{2}). There were 6,053 housing units at an average density of 967.4 per square mile (373.5/km^{2}). The racial makeup of the CDP was 92.13% White, 4.42% African American, 0.24% Native American, 2.08% Asian, 0.01% Pacific Islander, 0.39% from other races, and 0.73% from two or more races. Hispanic or Latino of any race were 1.62% of the population.

There were 5,911 households, out of which 46.7% had children under the age of 18 living with them, 73.1% were married couples living together, 7.1% had a female householder with no husband present, and 17.1% were non-families. 13.5% of all households were made up of individuals, and 2.5% had someone living alone who was 65 years of age or older. The average household size was 2.89 and the average family size was 3.21.

In the CDP, the population was spread out, with 29.8% under the age of 18, 7.3% from 18 to 24, 30.6% from 25 to 44, 27.3% from 45 to 64, and 5.0% who were 65 years of age or older. The median age was 36 years. For every 100 females, there were 98.4 males. For every 100 females age 18 and over, there were 95.4 males.

The median income for a household in the CDP was $73,536, and the median income for a family was $79,302. Males had a median income of $58,938 versus $31,339 for females. The per capita income for the CDP was $29,722. About 1.2% of families and 2.2% of the population were below the poverty line, including 2.8% of those under age 18 and 0.1% of those age 65 or over.

== Education ==
East Baton Rouge Parish Public Schools serves Shenandoah.

Zoned schools are as follows: Shenandoah Elementary School in Shenandoah serves a large portion of the CDP. A portion in the west is zoned to Parkview Elementary School, and a portion in the north is served by Wedgewood Elementary. Most of the community is zoned to Woodlawn Middle School in Shenandoah while a portion is zoned to Southeast Middle School in Baton Rouge. Almost all of Shenandoah is zoned to Woodlawn High School in Old Jefferson, while a small section is zoned to Tara High School in Baton Rouge.

St. Michael the Archangel High School, a private Catholic high school, is located in Shenandoah.

East Baton Rouge Parish Library operates the Jones Creek Regional Branch Library in the Shenandoah CDP. The 35,000-square-foot (3,300 m^{2}) facility, designed by Raymond Post Architects, was the first parish library financed by property taxes. It opened in April 1990.
