= Oak Hills Place, Louisiana =

- Neighborhood of St. George; Former census designated place
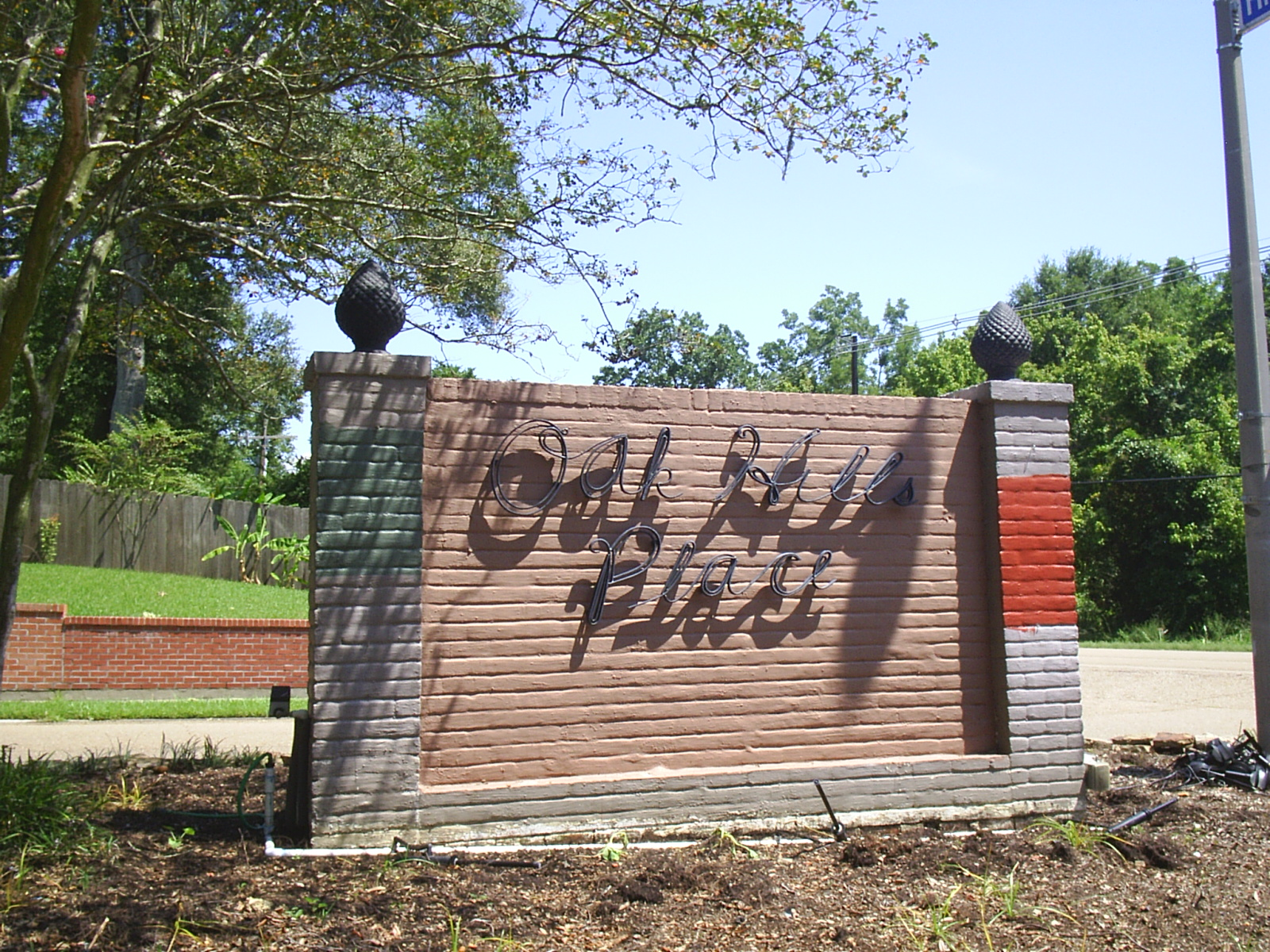

- Location in East Baton Rouge Parish and the state of Louisiana.
- Coordinates: 30°21′58″N 91°05′21″W
- Country: United States
- State: Louisiana
- Parish: East Baton Rouge

Area
  - Total: 3.16 sq mi (8.18 km^{2})
  - Land: 3.11 sq mi (8.06 km^{2})
  - Water: 0.046 sq mi (0.12 km^{2})
- Elevation: 36 ft (11 m)

Population (2020)
  - Total: 9,239
  - Density: 2,968.3/sq mi (1,146.06/km^{2})
- Time zone: UTC-6 (CST)
  - Summer (DST): UTC-5 (CDT)
- ZIP code: 70810
- Area code: 225
- FIPS code: 22-56855

Oak Hills Place is a neighborhood of St. George and former census designated place in East Baton Rouge Parish, Louisiana, United States. As of the 2020 census, Oak Hills Place had a population of 9,239. It is part of the Baton Rouge metropolitan statistical area, and one of the most affluent suburbs of Baton Rouge.

It is in the City of St. George.

== Geography ==
Oak Hills Place is located in southern East Baton Rouge Parish at 30°21′58″N 91°5′21″W (30.366159, -91.089250). It is bordered to the east by Village St. George, across Siegen Lane, and to the north partially by the city of Baton Rouge. The city's downtown is 9 miles (14 km) to the northwest of Oak Hills Place.

According to the United States Census Bureau, the Oak Hills Place CDP has a total area of 3.2 square miles (8.2 km^{2}), of which 3.1 square miles (8.1 km^{2}) is land and 0.04 square miles (0.1 km^{2}), or 1.53%, is water.

== Demographics ==
Historical population
Census	Pop.	Note	%±
1990	5,479		—
2000	7,996		45.9%
2010	8,195		2.5%
2020	9,239		12.7%
U.S. Decennial Census; 1960 1970 1980; 1990 2000 2010

Oak Hills Place was first listed as a census designated place in the 1990 U.S. census. It was deleted after the 2020 U.S. census after being absorbed into the newly formed city of St. George.

Oak Hills Place, Louisiana – Racial and ethnic composition Note: the US Census treats Hispanic/Latino as an ethnic category. This table excludes Latinos from the racial categories and assigns them to a separate category. Hispanics/Latinos may be of any race.
Race / Ethnicity (NH = Non-Hispanic)	Pop 2000	Pop 2010	Pop 2020	% 2000	% 2010	% 2020
White alone (NH)	6,435	6,093	6,656	80.48%	74.35%	72.04%
Black or African American alone (NH)	972	1,288	1,322	12.16%	15.72%	14.31%
Native American or Alaska Native alone (NH)	17	13	12	0.21%	0.16%	0.13%
Asian alone (NH)	282	390	480	3.53%	4.76%	5.20%
Native Hawaiian or Pacific Islander alone (NH)	3	0	0	0.04%	0.00%	0.00%
Other race alone (NH)	6	13	39	0.08%	0.16%	0.42%
Mixed race or Multiracial (NH)	81	76	258	1.01%	0.93%	2.79%
Hispanic or Latino (any race)	200	322	472	2.50%	3.93%	5.11%
Total	7,996	8,195	9,239	100.00%	100.00%	100.00%

As of the 2020 United States census, there were 9,239 people, 3,818 households, and 2,192 families residing in the CDP.

As of the census of 2000, there were 7,996 people, 2,989 households, and 2,253 families residing in the CDP. The population density was 2,608.0 inhabitants per square mile (1,007.0/km^{2}). There were 3,131 housing units at an average density of 1,021.2 per square mile (394.3/km^{2}). The racial makeup of the CDP was 82.45% White, 12.16% African American, 0.21% Native American, 3.53% Asian, 0.04% Pacific Islander, 0.41% from other races, and 1.20% from two or more races. Hispanic or Latino of any race were 2.50% of the population.

There were 2,989 households, out of which 39.0% had children under the age of 18 living with them, 65.7% were married couples living together, 7.6% had a female householder with no husband present, and 24.6% were non-families. 20.2% of all households were made up of individuals, and 4.7% had someone living alone who was 65 years of age or older. The average household size was 2.67 and the average family size was 3.13.

In the CDP, the population was spread out, with 27.9% under the age of 18, 7.7% from 18 to 24, 28.1% from 25 to 44, 28.4% from 45 to 64, and 7.8% who were 65 years of age or older. The median age was 37 years. For every 100 females, there were 93.0 males. For every 100 females age 18 and over, there were 89.4 males.

The median income for a household in the CDP was $77,668, and the median income for a family was $90,444. Males had a median income of $63,571 versus $32,207 for females. The per capita income for the CDP was $64,994. About 0.1% of families and 0.2% of the population were below the poverty line, including 2.1% of those under age 18 and 2.7% of those age 65 or over.

== Education ==
East Baton Rouge Parish Public Schools serves Oak Hills Place.

Schools with attendance boundaries including the community are as follows: Most of the community is served by Wildwood Elementary School, while the northern portion is served by Westminster Elementary School in Westminster. Most of the area is served by Kenilworth Middle School, while Woodlawn Middle School serves a section in the northeast. As of 2016 Kenilworth is under the administration of the Recovery School District of Louisiana, and the portion of the Kenilworth zone which houses most of the CDP has Westdale Middle School, directly controlled by EBR Schools, as an option. Most residents are served by Tara High School while some to the northeast are served by Woodlawn High School.

The private school The Dunham School is in Oak Hills Place.

== Recreation ==
LSU Hilltop Arboretum, operated by Louisiana State University, is in the former CDP.
