= St. George, Louisiana =

City in Louisiana

St. George
- City
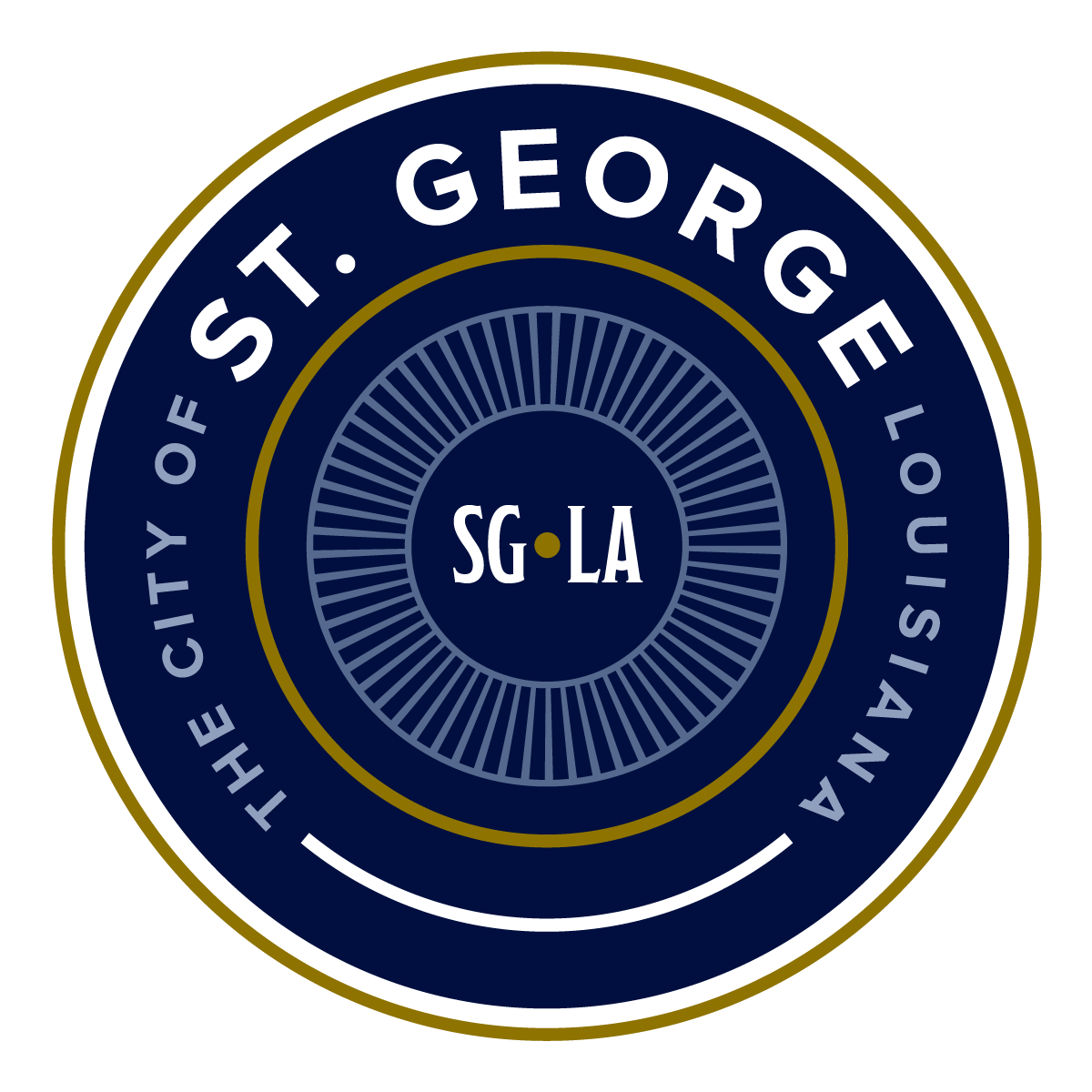
- Seal

- Location within Louisiana
- Coordinates: 30.36523°N 91.02615°W
- Country: United States
- State: Louisiana
- Parish: East Baton Rouge
- Incorporated: October 12, 2019

Government
  - Mayor: Dustin Yates
  - City Council: District 1: Richie Edmonds; District 2: Steve Monachello; District 3: Max Himmel; District 4: Patty Cooked; District 5: Andrew Murrell; At-Large: David Dellucci; At-Large: Jim Talbot

Population (2019)
  - Total: 86,316
- Time zone: UTC-6:00 (CST)
  - Summer (DST): UTC-5:00 (CDT)
- Website: Official website

St. George is a city in East Baton Rouge Parish in Louisiana, USA. With a population of 86,316 as of 2019, it is the second most populous city in the parish (after Baton Rouge) and fifth most populous in the state.

St. George is the newest incorporated city in Louisiana and was approved through a ballot initiative on October 12, 2019. The city originated from previously unincorporated areas located southeast of Baton Rouge.

A legal action of St. George was filed in 19th Judicial District Court in East Baton Rouge Parish on November 4, 2019. After rulings by the district court and the Louisiana First Circuit Court of Appeals, the Louisiana Supreme Court upheld the incorporation in a 4–3 decision.

== History ==
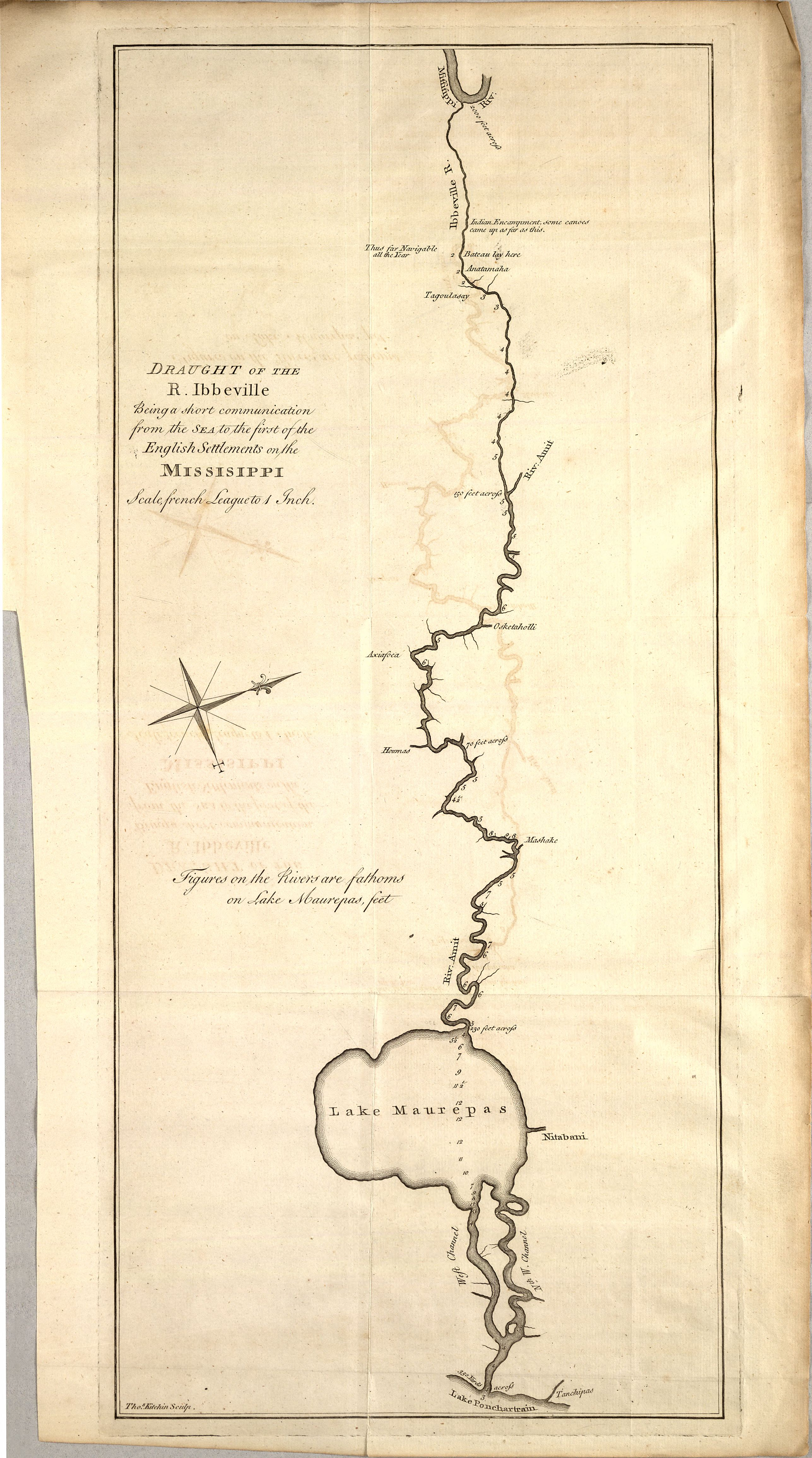
1770 "Draught of the R. Ibbeville", i.e., Bayou Manchac (Library of Congress)

=== Native American presence ===
After the French and Indian War ended in 1763, Bayou Manchac (originally known as Rivière d'Iberville or the Iberville River) became an international border between the British (West Florida) and Spanish (Isle of Orleans) colonial territories. This bayou (which now forms the southern border of the City of St. George) runs from the Mississippi River on the west to the Amite River on the east.

Native Americans, specifically the Choctaw, were known to have lived in southeast Louisiana when Europeans first arrived. In 1764, after encroachment by European settlers, the Alabama-Coushatta and Pakana Muscogee Indians migrated into Louisiana, just north of Bayou Manchac.

=== American Revolution ===
In 1765, the British built Fort Bute on the eastern bank of the Mississippi River at Bayou Manchac, not far from the present-day University Club Golf Course. The fort consisted of a blockhouse and stockade capable of housing 200 men.

On May 8, 1779, Spain officially entered the American Revolutionary War by declaring war against the British. With this news, Bernardo de Gálvez, the colonial Governor of Spanish Louisiana, began assembling an ad hoc army of over 1,400 Spanish regulars, Acadian militia, free men of color, and Native Americans. On August 27, 1779, they began advancing toward Baton Rouge. Trudging through muddy swamp at a rate of nine miles a day, they arrived at Fort Bute eleven days later. After a brief skirmish, they captured and demolished the fort in what would become the first Spanish action against the British during the American Revolutionary War. Galvez and his army remained at Fort Bute for six days before moving on to defeat the British garrison at Fort New Richmond in the Battle of Baton Rouge (1779). Their victories at Fort Bute and Fort New Richmond helped clear the Mississippi River of British forces and put the lower Mississippi River under Spanish control.

=== War of 1812 ===
During the War of 1812, U.S. Gen. Andrew Jackson had the mouth of Bayou Manchac filled with earth to prevent the British from using it to launch a surprise attack on New Orleans. In 1828, American settlers reinforced that blockage with a large earthen dam to reduce floodwaters from regularly inundating their properties. Although it was later suggested that reconnecting the two bodies of water might actually help alleviate flooding in the area, the U.S. Army Corps of Engineers declined to do so.

=== Village St. George ===
Between 1956 and 1968, the Village St. George subdivision was constructed near its namesake, later forming the core of the census-designated place (CDP) of the same name.

In 1966, the increased suburbanization of the area warranted the creation of the "Village St. George Volunteer Fire Department and Social Club," now called the St. George Fire Protection District. Its coverage area also overlapped with much of the new city's boundaries.

=== Place names ===
1895 map of East Baton Rouge Parish (Library of Congress)

Prominent place names in the St. George area include:

- Amite River: Possibly from the French amitié ("friendship") or Choctaw himmita ("young")
- Baton Rouge: Le bâton rouge (French for "the red stick") is a translation of Istrouma, possibly a corruption of the Choctaw iti humma ("red pole")
- Bayou Manchac: From the Choctaw expression for "rear entrance" (i.e., to Lake Pontchartrain)
- Essen Lane: Named by ethnic Germans in the area after a city in Germany
- Highland Road: From the "Dutch [i.e., German {Deutsch}] Highlanders," a colony of Pennsylvania German farmers who settled along the bluffs that overlook the Mississippi River floodplain at Highland Road
- Kleinpeter Farms Dairy: From the name (literally, "short [or young] Peter") of a prominent early German family in the area
- Mississippi River: From the French (Messipi) rendering of the Anishinaabe (Ojibwe or Algonquin) name for the river (Misi-ziibi), meaning "Great River"
- Nicholson Drive (Louisiana Highway 30): Named for James W. Nicholson, Civil War veteran and former president of Louisiana State University (1883–1884 and 1887–1896)
- Perkins Road: Named for twin brothers from Kentucky who owned sugar plantations in Baton Rouge
- Siegen Lane: Named by ethnic Germans in the area after a city in Germany
- Staring Lane: From the name of a prominent early German family in the area

== Annexations ==
Incorporated areas of East Baton Rouge Parish with City of Baton Rouge highlighted. Any property owner in unincorporated areas adjacent to the Baton Rouge city limits can petition for annexation into Baton Rouge.

Prior to the incorporation of St. George, any property owner in unincorporated areas adjacent to the Baton Rouge city limits could request to be annexed into the city of Baton Rouge. The request for annexation had to be submitted to the Metro Council for approval.

During the first petition effort, several residents and business owners annexed into the Baton Rouge city limits (viz., Baton Rouge General Medical Center – Bluebonnet Campus, Celtic Media, Costco, L'Auberge Casino & Hotel Baton Rouge, Mall of Louisiana, Our Lady of the Lake Regional Medical Center, Siegen Lane Marketplace, and the residential neighborhood Legacy Court).

Following the October 12, 2019, election, additional residents and business owners in the proposed St. George city limits requested annexation into the City of Baton Rouge (viz., One United Plaza, Two United Plaza, Four United Plaza, Eight United Plaza, Twelve United Plaza, United Plaza III, Lipsey's and Turner Industries). On January 8, 2020, the Metro Council approved all of these annexations.

On February 7, 2020, St. George organizers filed a lawsuit seeking to invalidate the annexations in the United Plaza area. The lawsuit claims that the legal requirements for these annexations were not followed. An attorney who represents the property owners claims that the lawsuit is without merit. Annexation petitions requested following the certification date of the October 12, 2019 election to incorporate the City of St. George could possibly be declared null and void since the City of Baton Rouge at that date lacked the authority to annex any properties within the boundaries of St. George established in the State of Louisiana approved petition to incorporate as authorized by Title 33 of Louisiana law.

On February 26, 2020, the Metro Council approved additional annexations into the City of Baton Rouge (viz., Louisiana State Employees Retirement System, Teachers Retirement System of Louisiana and Two Sisters of Baton Rouge).

== Incorporation ==
The incorporation of St. George in East Baton Rouge Parish became the focus of a years-long court battle over whether the new municipality met Louisiana's legal requirements for incorporation. After voters approved the proposal in 2019, opponents of the incorporation, including Mayor-President Sharon Weston Broome, fought for St. George to remain unincorporated, claiming the petition was incomplete and that the city would be unable to provide essential services. Two lower courts, the 19th Judicial District Court and the Louisiana First Circuit Court of Appeal, agreed and blocked the incorporation. On April 26, 2024, the Louisiana Supreme Court reversed those rulings in a 4–3 decision, finding that St. George could reasonably operate as a city. The decision permitted incorporation to move forward.

=== Population ===
St. George was incorporated through a ballot initiative on October 12, 2019, with 54% of the population supporting incorporation. With a population of 86,316, it is the second most populous city in the parish (after Baton Rouge) and the fifth most populous in the state.

=== Government ===
==== Appointment of the interim government ====
According to Louisiana Revised Statute Title 33, Section 6 - Officers of newly incorporated municipality:

The governor shall appoint all the officers of a newly incorporated municipality, who shall give bond as required. Such officers shall hold office until the next general municipal election and until their successors take their oaths of office.

==== Appointment of city officials ====
On May 14, 2024, following the Louisiana Supreme Court's decision to reverse the lower courts' ruling, thus allowing the incorporation of the City of St. George, Governor Jeff Landry appointed Dustin Yates to be the interim mayor and Todd Morrison to be the police chief.

On May 23, 2024, Landry appointed the following members to serve as aldermen for the city of St. George.

- District 1: Steven Monachell
- District 2: Ryan Heck
- District 3: Max Himmel
- At-large: Richie Edmonds
- At-large: Patty Cook

==== Transition district officers ====
Following the Louisiana Supreme Court's April 2024 decision overturning the lawsuit challenging the incorporation of the City of St. George, the St. George Transition District had the necessary authority to proceed with duties outlined in Act 361 of the 2020 Regular Session of the Louisiana Legislature. The first act was to elect officers. The officers elected included: J. Andrew Murrell as chairman, Norman Browning as vice chairman, Chris Rials as treasurer, Jim Talbot as a district member, and William Potter as secretary. Browning, Rials, Murrell, and Talbot were heavily involved in the petition efforts to incorporate, while Potter was recommended to serve by East Baton Rouge Mayor-President Sharon Weston Broome. The transition district then approved a motion to request that East Baton Rouge Parish transfer a 2% sales tax revenue to the St. George Transition District. The transition district also voted to approve the opening of a bank account at Hancock-Whitney Bank, and approved the motion to headquarter the transition district out of the interim city hall located at the St. George Fire District Training Academy.

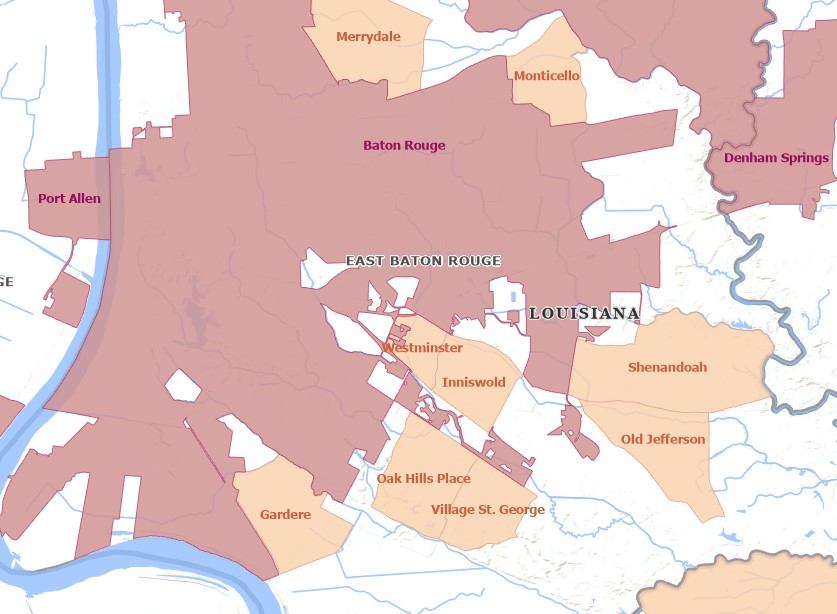
Map showing the census-designated places of East Baton Rouge Parish prior to the incorporation of St. George

=== Census-designated places ===
The city of St. George includes six former Census-designated places (CDPs) of East Baton Rouge Parish:

- Inniswold
- Oak Hills Place
- Old Jefferson
- Shenandoah
- Village St. George
- Westminster

A seventh CDP, Gardere, chose not to join the new city in the first petition effort and remains unincorporated.

== Public safety ==
The St. George Fire Protection District is the fire department covering the city.

== Parks and recreation ==
The St. George area is served by the Recreation and Park Commission for the Parish of East Baton Rouge (BREC). Park facilities in the St. George area include the Burbank Soccer Complex, the Highland Road Community Park, the Highland Road Park Observatory, Santa Maria Golf Course, and Airline Highway Park.

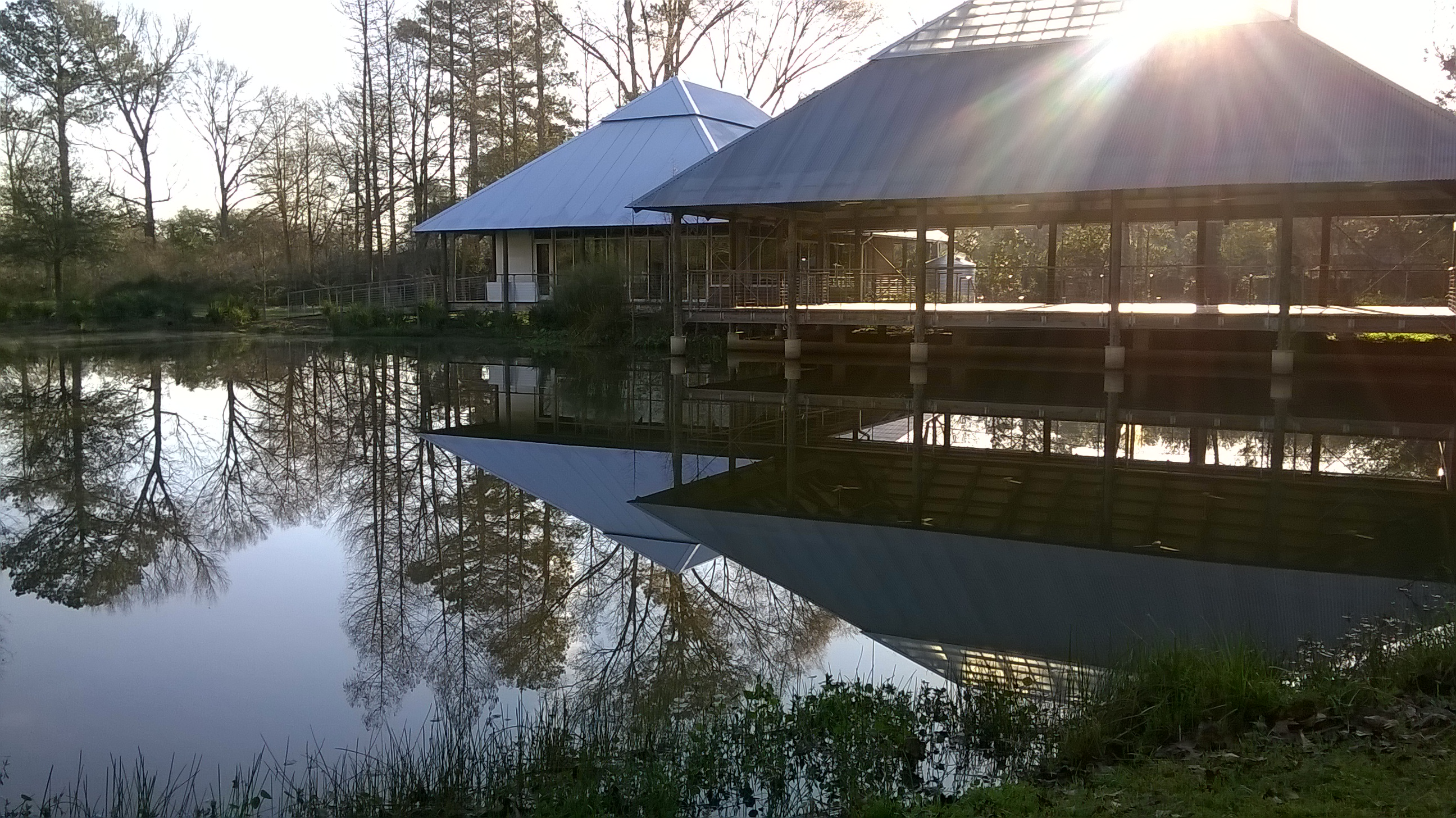
LSU Hilltop Arboretum

Through BREC's Capital Area Pathways Project (CAPP), a network of connected trails and greenways is being developed throughout the parish. BREC's Blueways initiative provides paddling access to Bayou Fountain from Highland Road Community Park. Additional canoe-kayak launches are planned for Bayou Manchac and Ward Creek.

The LSU Hilltop Arboretum is a 14-acre museum showcasing an extensive collection of Louisiana native trees and shrubs. It includes a pond with an elevated wooden boardwalk and trails through more than 150 species of Southern native trees, shrubs, and wildflowers. A new feature is a wildflower meadow with an earthen amphitheater. A historic marker near the pond helps to identify the route of pioneering Philadelphia naturalist William Bartram (1739–1823) through eight southern states, including Louisiana.

=== Historic sites ===
The National Register of Historic Places includes several sites in the St. George area. Among them are:

- Audubon Plantation
- Les Chenes Vertes ("Live Oaks")
- Lee Site Archaeological Site (access restricted)
- Ory House
- Santa Maria Plantation
- Sara Peralta Archeological Site (access restricted)
- Willow Grove
- Woodstock Plantation

Other sites of historical interest in the St. George area include:

- Burtville: Founded ca. 1887, Burtville was a logging town located on Nicholson Drive (Louisiana Highway 30).
- Fort Bute: The original site lies beneath the Mississippi River.
- Hoo Shoo Too Club: The fishing lodge of the all-male Hoo Shoo Too Club (established in 1885) was located along the banks of the Amite River.
- Jefferson Highway: The historic Jefferson Highway was designated in 1916. It runs from New Orleans, Louisiana, to Winnipeg, Manitoba, Canada.
- Old Hickory Lodge: Believed to have been built in 1814 as a Masonic Lodge, the Old Hickory operated as a private social club at the intersection of Jefferson Highway and Tiger Bend Road.
- St. George Catholic Church: Founded in 1908, the church was the second Catholic church in East Baton Rouge Parish, after the downtown Baton Rouge church that would eventually be designated as St. Joseph Cathedral. The church parish's original boundaries were similar to the City of St. George's city limits, providing the area with an early sense of continuity. At present, it remains prominent in the area as the second-largest parish within the Diocese of Baton Rouge, along with its new 1,200-seat church building at Siegen Lane.

== Education ==
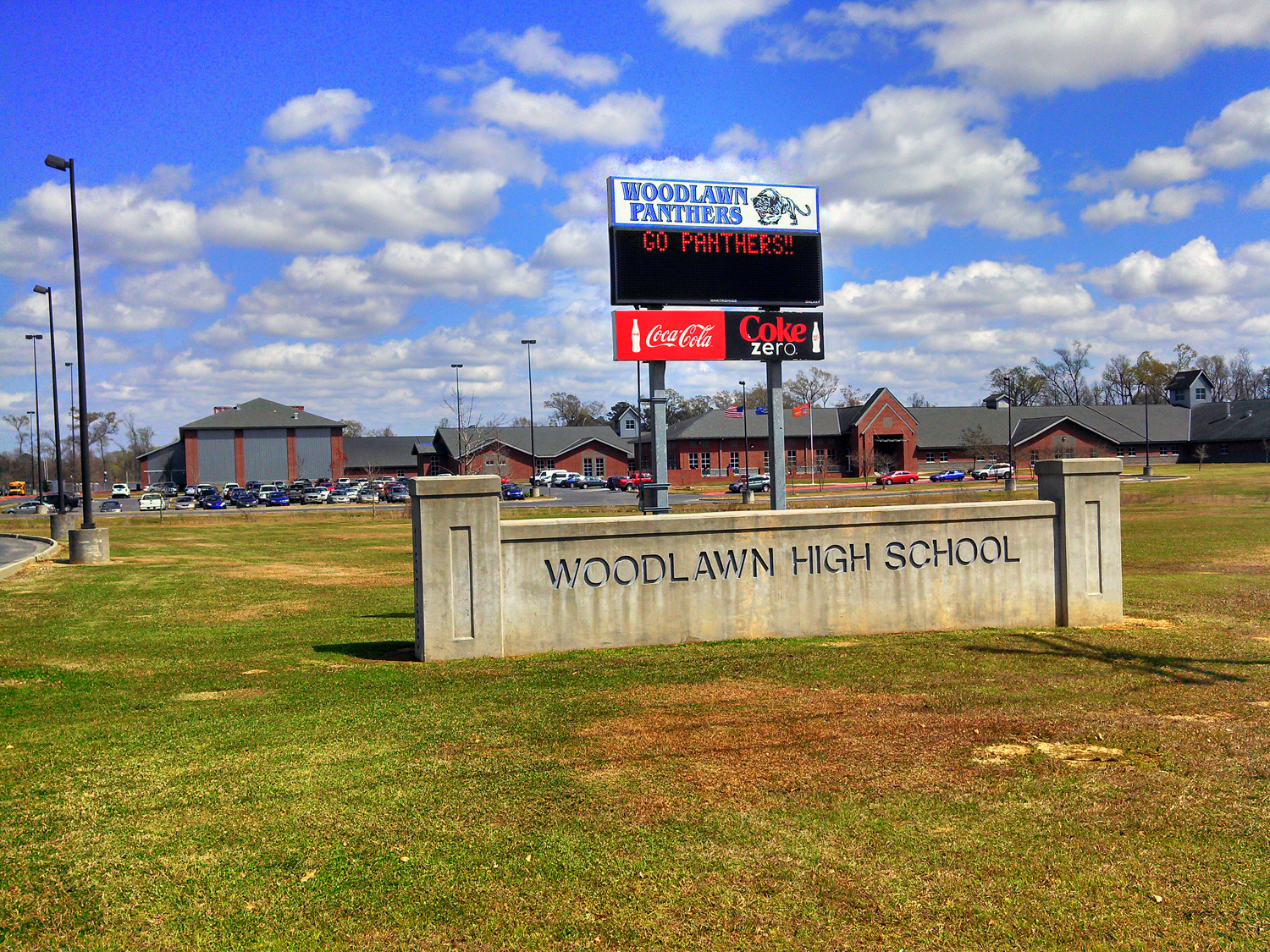
Woodlawn High School

As of 2026 the city is in the East Baton Rouge Parish School System.

School district facilities in the city limits:

- Shenandoah Elementary School
- Woodlawn Elementary School
- Woodlawn Middle School
- Jefferson Terrace Academy (K-8 school)
- Woodlawn High School

Westminster Elementary School was in St. George. It closed in 2025.

Charter schools include:

- Kenilworth Science & Technology Academy

Catholic schools are under the Roman Catholic Diocese of Baton Rouge:

- Most Blessed Sacrament Catholic School (K-8)
- St. Michael the Archangel High School

Other private schools in the city limits:

- The Dunham School

=== Proposed school district ===
The incorporation effort for St. George began with a goal of creating a new school district independent of the East Baton Rouge school district.

To form a new school district, however, the new city must first be established. Therefore, a new school district was not on the petition or ballot for the formation of the City of St. George.

The process for establishing a new school district in the St. George area would require several steps:

- Authorize a constitutional amendment: The Louisiana State Constitution would need to be amended to allow the new school district to access state education funds and to give the City of St. George authority to levy local property taxes. Authorization in the state legislature for a statewide referendum on a constitutional amendment would require support of two-thirds of both the House and the Senate.
- Establish boundaries: The state legislature, in a simple majority vote, would need to approve the map of the area to be served by the proposed St. George school district. The boundaries could extend beyond the boundaries of the City of St. George.
- Obtain voter approval: A statewide referendum would need to be held to approve the constitutional amendment. A majority of voters in the state as well as a majority of voters in East Baton Rouge Parish would need to approve the constitutional amendment for it to become law.

All of these steps would need to occur before a new school district could be formed.

In 2025, two bills were put forth in the Louisiana Legislature. Senate Bill 234 (SB234), co-authored by Louisiana State Senator Rick Edmonds and Louisiana Representative Emily Chenevert, would establish the St. George Public School System, and Senate Bill 25 (SB25), with the same co-authors, would allow St. George to be considered an equal and valid school district to established school districts in Louisiana, thus making them eligible to receive Minimum Foundation Program (MFP) funding.

Since SB25 would require a constitutional amendment, it would have to pass both houses of the legislature by a two-thirds majority vote, while SB234 would require only a simple majority vote in each house.

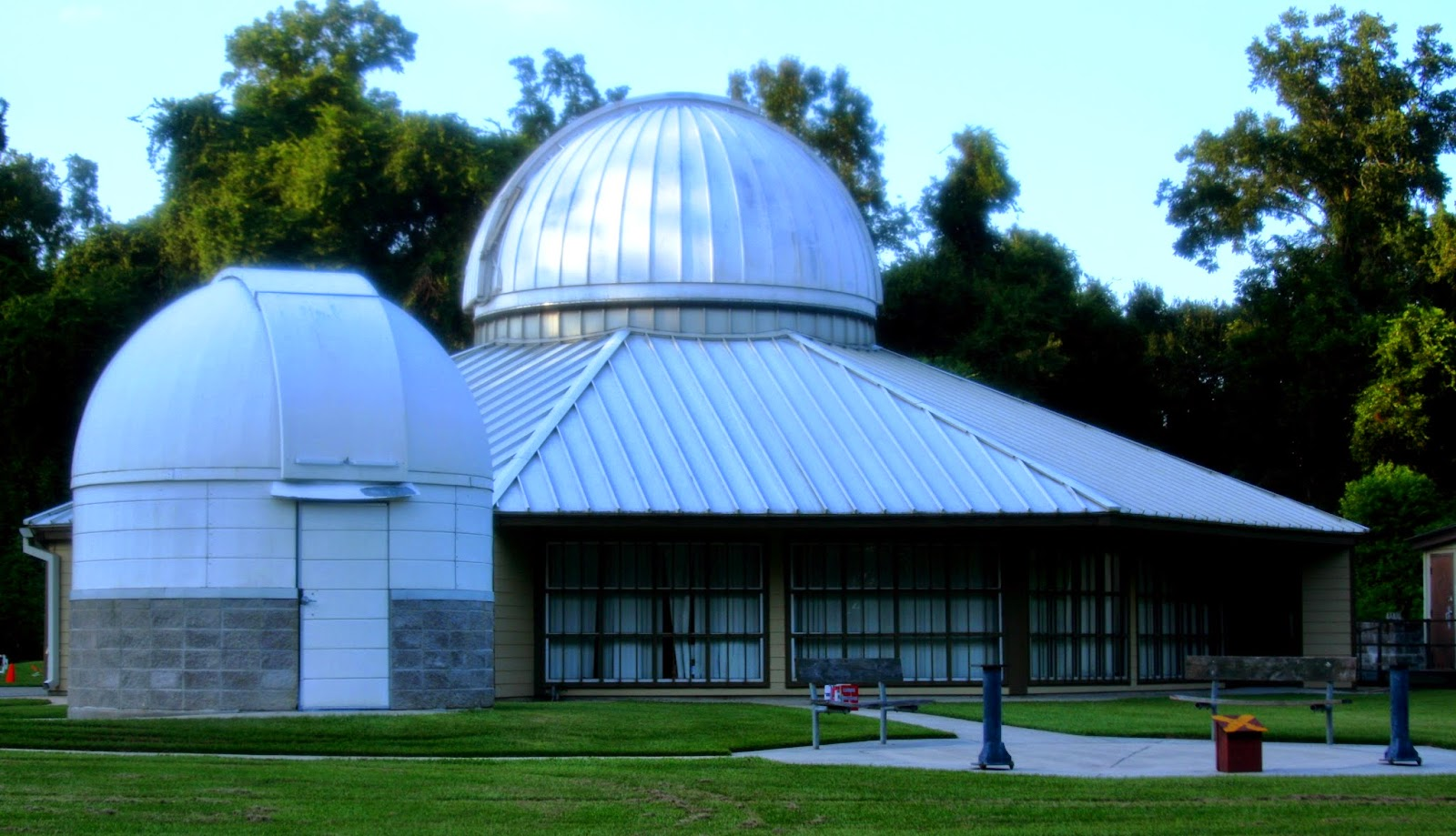
The Highland Road Park Observatory is jointly operated by Louisiana State University's Department of Physics and Astronomy, the Baton Rouge Astronomical Society and the Recreation and Park Commission for the Parish of East Baton Rouge (BREC). It is located in Highland Road Community Park.

=== Libraries ===
East Baton Rouge Parish Library (EBRPL) operates the Jones Creek Regional Branch Library.

In 2026 there was a proposal to create a separate public library system for St. George, though a referendum on such was delayed. St. George City Council pro tem, Andrew Murrell, created a proposal to do that.

=== Informal education ===
Facilities in the St. George area that provide opportunities for informal education include:

- Highland Road Park Observatory
- LSU Hilltop Arboretum

== Transportation ==
There are no east–west roads that run through the entire length of the city limits. However, Interstate 10, U.S. Highway 61 (a major north–south highway that links Wyoming, Minnesota, to New Orleans), and the Jefferson Highway (a once-major north–south highway that links Winnipeg, Canada, to New Orleans) pass through the center of St. George in a north–south direction. The CDP of Old Jefferson is named for its proximity to the old Jefferson Highway.

The Capital Area Transit System (CATS) operates public transportation in St. George. As of 2019 people organizing the city stated that they had no intentions of seeking expansion of CATS' services within the new city limits.

== Economy ==
The economy of the St. George area is an integral part of the Baton Rouge economy, the East Baton Rouge Parish economy, and the Baton Rouge MSA.

== Geography ==
=== Area ===
The city covers approximately 60 square miles and is located entirely within the southeastern section of East Baton Rouge Parish, bordered on the west by the Mississippi River, on the south by Bayou Manchac, and on the east by the Amite River. Much of the northwestern boundary of the city extends to the Baton Rouge city limits, although portions of St. George border unincorporated parish land.

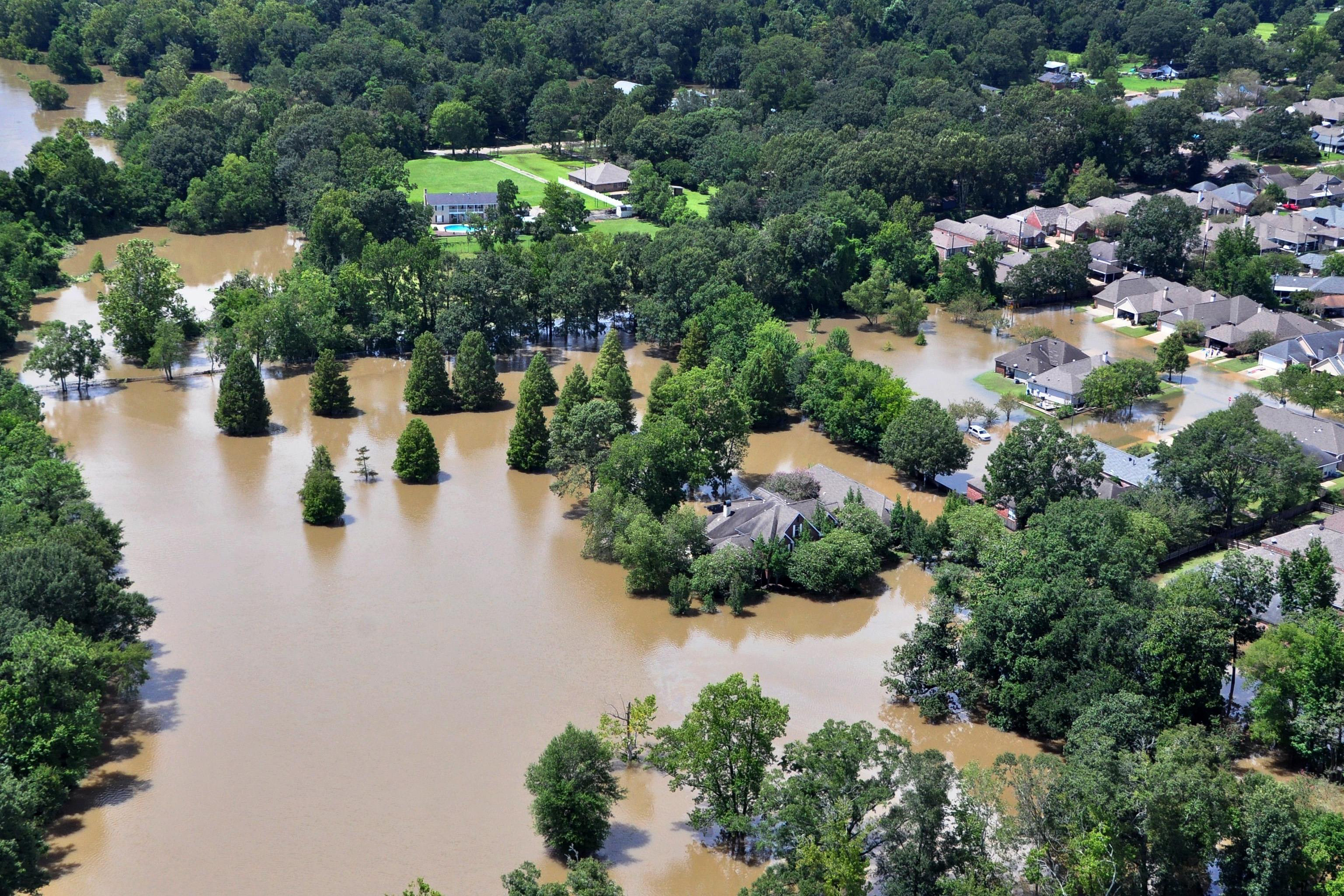
The 2016 Louisiana floods affected much of East Baton Rouge Parish, including the St. George area.

=== Flooding ===
The 2016 Louisiana floods had a profound effect upon East Baton Rouge Parish, particularly along the Comite River, the Amite River, and Bayou Manchac. In response, East Baton Rouge Parish developed a Stormwater Master Plan Implementation Framework to mitigate flooding concerns.

In 2018, Congress authorized funding for the East Baton Rouge Parish Flood Risk Reduction Project to reduce flooding throughout the parish. Using $187 million in federal funds and $64 million in matching state and local funds, the project will provide for 66 miles of drainage improvements along five sub-basins in the parish (see interactive map of the EBR Flood Risk Management Project). In the St. George area, the authorized four-year projects involve:

1. Jones Creek and tributaries: clearing and snagging three miles and structurally lining 16 miles with reinforced concrete ($148.5 million)
2. Ward Creek and tributaries: clearing and snagging 14 miles of channel and concrete lining ($20.5 million)
3. Bayou Fountain: clearing and widening 11 miles of channel ($13 million)

Organizers of the City of St. George have budgeted $2,247,000 in Year 1 for drainage and transportation. This accounts for just over 1 percent of the proposed costs.

=== Baton Rouge fault ===
The Baton Rouge fault is an active growth fault that runs across the southern part of East Baton Rouge Parish, including parts of the St. George area. It extends from the Mississippi River near downtown Baton Rouge to the Amite River. In the St. George area, it generally runs along Tiger Bend Road from Airline Highway (Highway 61) to the Amite River. The height of the escarpment ranges from 13 to 23 feet (4 to 7 m). The average rate of vertical movement is about 0.12 to 0.20 inches (3 to 5 mm) per year. The fault has had a particularly pronounced effect near the Jones Creek Road-Tiger Bend Road intersection. Continuous structural repairs to Woodlawn High School buildings located at that intersection forced the abandonment of the property and the building of a new school complex in Old Jefferson—the first new campus that the school board built in the parish in more than thirty years. In 2017, several residents from the Tiger Bend area raised concerns about plans for an upscale subdivision located near the fault line.

=== Geomorphology ===
A Pleistocene prairie terrace, formed of alluvial deposits and wind-blown soil (Peoria loess), underlies most of East Baton Rouge Parish. In the St. George area, long slopes along portions of Highland Road can be seen where the prairie terrace meets the Mississippi River floodplain. Visitors to the LSU Hilltop Arboretum, for example, must drive up the slope to enter the facility.
