= East Baton Rouge Parish Library =

- 30.443034°N 91.106471°W
- Location: Baton Rouge, Louisiana
- Established: 1939
- Branches: 14

Collection
- Size: 2,460,233 (2018)

Access and use
- Circulation: 2,972,067 (2018)
- Members: 251,578 (2018)

Other information
- Budget: $40 million
- Director: Katrina Stokes
- Website: www.ebrpl.com

East Baton Rouge Parish Library (EBRPL) is the public library system of East Baton Rouge Parish, Louisiana, United States. It serves Baton Rouge and other cities in the parish.

== History ==
The East Baton Rouge Public Library was established in 1939 with the donation of second-hand collected books from the city. Quick to expand, the library had eight branches within its first three years as a system. The most recent addition to the system is the South Branch Library, which opened in March 2025.

Since 1986, the library has been funded by a 10-year dedicated property tax. This tax, funded at 11.1 mills, provides funding for all library operations, improvements, and salaries. While the tax was lowered to 10.78 mills in the early 2000s, it was raised back to 11.1 mills in 2015. Its most recent renewal was on October 24, 2015.

== Libraries ==
- Main Library
- Baker Branch Library - Baker
- Bluebonnet Regional Branch Library
- Carver Branch Library
- Central Branch Library - Central
- Delmont Gardens Branch Library
- Eden Park Branch Library
- Fairwood Branch Library
- Greenwell Springs Regional Branch - Monticello (unincorporated area)
- Jones Creek Regional Branch Library - St. George, formerly in Shenandoah (then an unincorporated area)
- Pride-Chaneyville Branch Library - Pride (unincorporated area)
- River Center Branch Library
- Scotlandville Branch Library
- South Branch Library
- Zachary Branch Library - Zachary
