= The Dunham School =

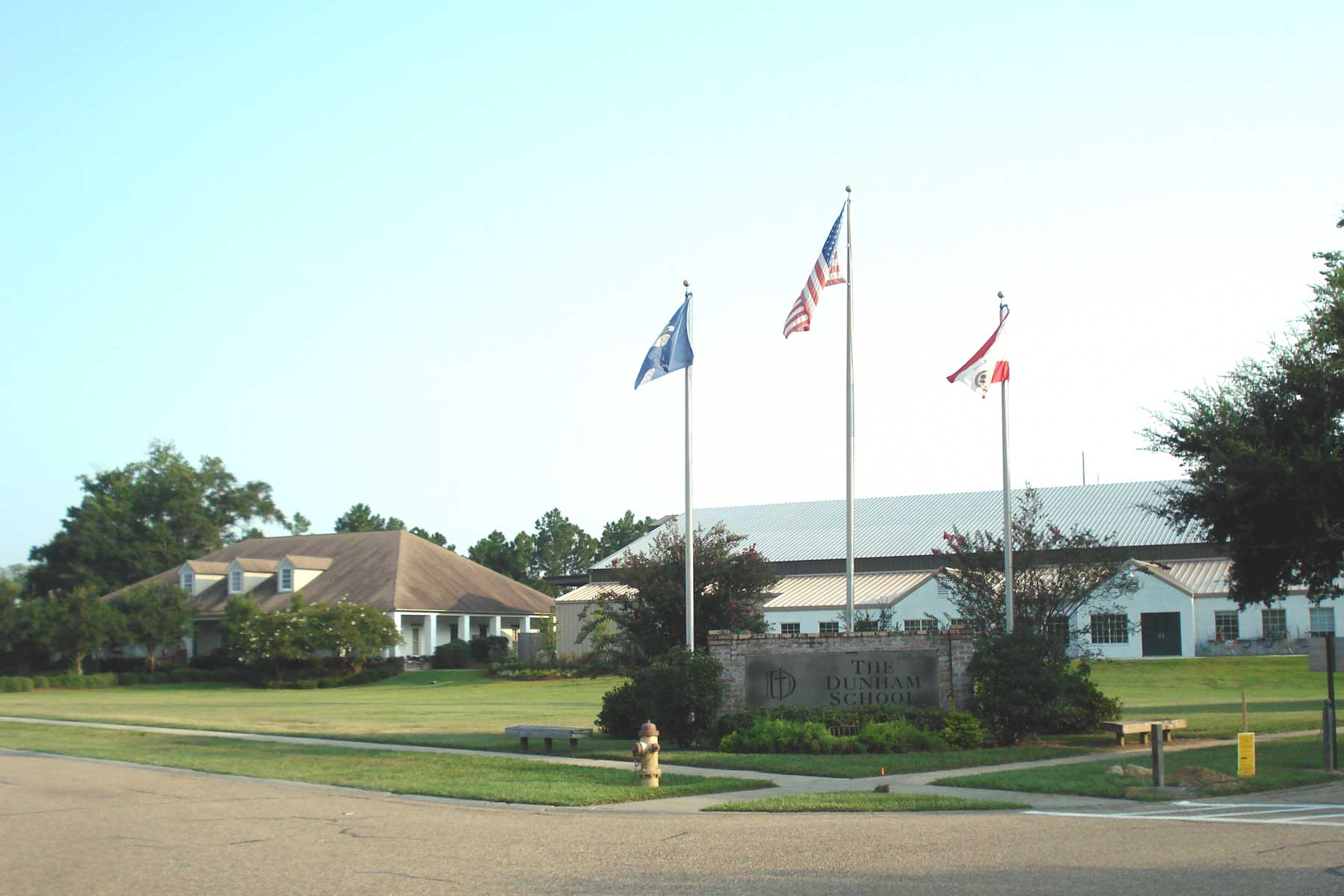
- The Dunham School (2007)

Location
- 11111 Roy Emerson Dr. St. George, Louisiana 70810; United States; 30.3824°N 91.0851°W

Information
- Motto: "Educating the Mind and the Heart for Christ"
- Established: 1981
- Principal: Amanda McIlwain (Upper School); Amos Lyso (Middle School); Deedra LaPlace (Lower School)
- Head of school: Steve Eagleton
- Staff: 37
- Faculty: 91
- Grades: PreK3-12
- Student to teacher ratio: 10:1
- Campus size: 23 acres (93,000 m^{2})
- Campus type: Suburban
- Colors: Cardinal and silver
- Athletics: Football, Baseball, Softball, Basketball, Cross-Country, Golf, Powerlifting, Soccer, Swimming, Tennis, Track & Field, Volleyball, Wrestling
- Athletics conference: LHSAA Division III
- Mascot: "Trafton" the Tiger
- Nickname: Tigers
- Yearbook: Lagniappe
- Affiliation: Christian
- Information: (225) 767-7097
- Website: www.dunhamschool.org

The Dunham School is an independent, inter-denominational, Christian, college-preparatory, coeducational day school in St. George, Louisiana, United States. Located in the Oak Hills Place neighborhood, and founded in 1981 as Trafton Academy, it serves students from pre-kindergarten through grade twelve. The school is accredited by the Southern Association of Colleges and Schools, and the Louisiana Department of Education and is a member of the National Association of Independent Schools. The school also won a 2005 Blue Ribbon Award and has been recognized as a seven-time Apple Distinguished School for its one-to-one laptop program, which was started in 2009.

== History ==
St. George began its jurisdiction on April 26, 2024, and so the school is now in the city limits of St. George.

== Campus ==
The campus is located on 23 acres (93,000 m^{2}) in the Wimbledon subdivision off Perkins Road south of Baton Rouge. The school has a total of 89 classrooms. The Lower School Complex consists of 30 classroom spaces, a library, a music studio and an art studio. The Brown-Holt Chapel Arts Center is the central hub for artistic expression at the school. The school's weekly chapel services take place here, as well as the yearly fine art performances. Brown-Holt contains the Dunham Family chapel auditorium, two art studios, a black box theatre, and band and choir studio spaces. The campus also includes a 12,000 square foot athletic center, weight and training rooms, baseball and softball fields, Lower and Middle School gymnasium, Upper School gymnasium, golf practice facility with putting green, football and soccer complex, and indoor baseball practice facility. The McKay Academic Center (MAC) focuses on specialized learning for students that learn differently. The MAC hosts eleven classrooms itself.

For the 2020–2021 school year there were 91 faculty and 37 staff members and 761 enrolled students: 282 in the Upper School, 226 in the Middle School, and 253 in the Lower School.

== Athletics ==
The Dunham School athletics competes in the LHSAA.

=== Championships ===
Football championships

- (2) State Championship: 2004, 2025

Baseball championships

- (1) State Championship: 1987

Boys' basketball championships

- (5) State Championship: 1987, 1998, 2018, 2020, 2021

Volleyball championships

- (2) State Championship: 2005, 2022

=== Coaches ===
Football
Dunham won its second football state championship as the 2025 Louisiana Division III Select state champions under Head Coach, Neil Weiner.

== Notable alumni ==
- Cary Koch, former CFL professional football player for the Saskatchewan Roughriders, Class of 2004
- Derek Stingley Jr., NFL defensive back for the Houston Texans, Class of 2019

== See also ==
- List of high schools in Louisiana
