= Woodlawn High School (St. George, Louisiana) =

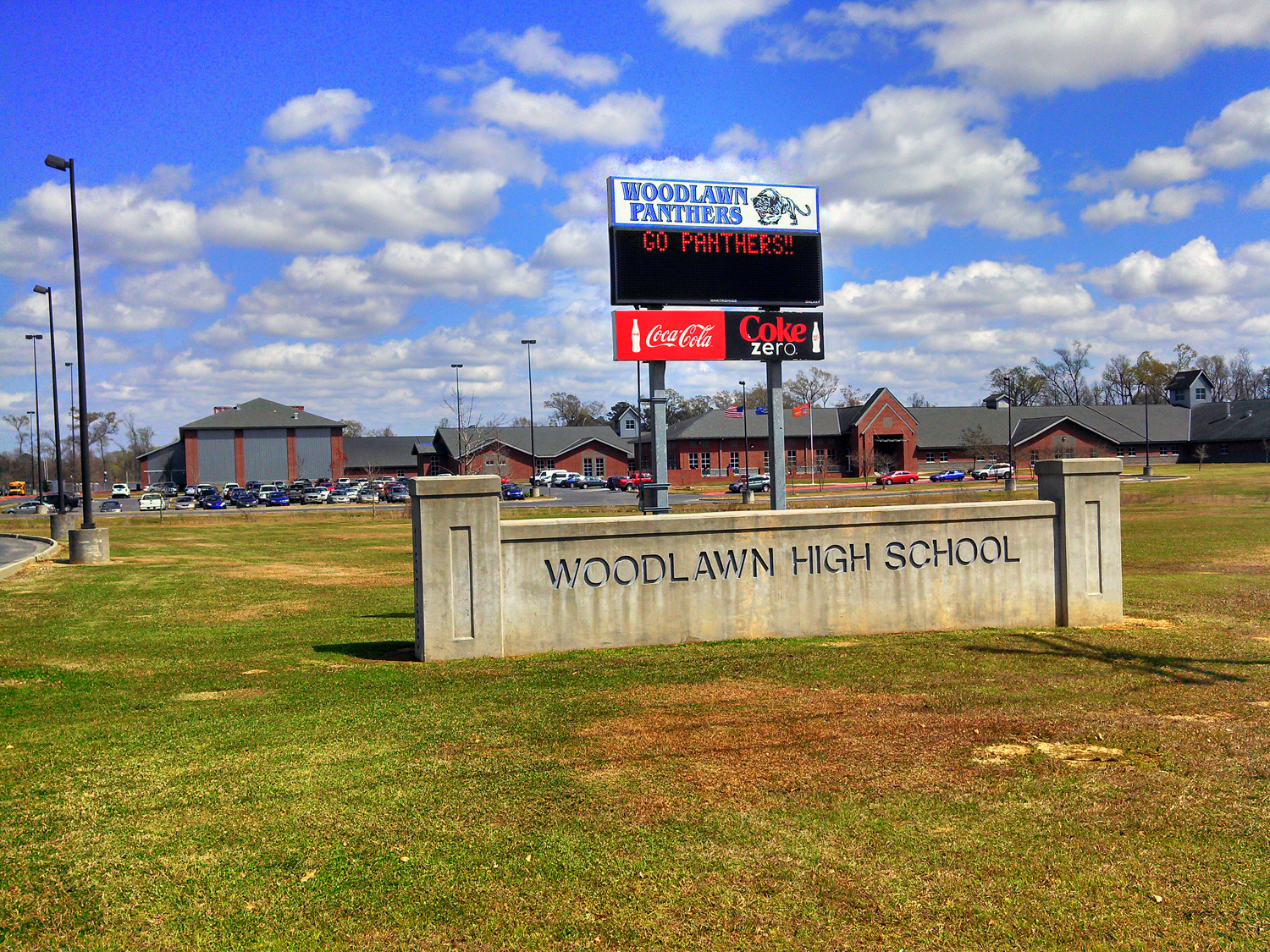

Location
- 15755 Jefferson Hwy. Baton Rouge, Louisiana, 70817; USA; 30.373523°N 91.013703°W

Information
- Type: public
- Established: 1949
- School district: East Baton Rouge Parish Public Schools
- Principal: Brandon Levatino
- Teaching staff: 102.76 (FTE)
- Grades: 9 - 12
- Enrollment: 1,450 (2023-2024)
- Student to teacher ratio: 14.11
- Campus size: 57-acre (230,000 m^{2})
- Campus type: Suburb
- Colors: Purple, White, Silver, and Black
- Mascot: Purple Panther
- Nickname: Panthers
- Rival: Dutchtown Griffins; Broadmoor Buccaneers
- Yearbook: The Echo
- Budget: $23.598 Million USD
- Website: ebrschools.org/schools/aboutwoodlawnhigh/

Woodlawn High School (commonly Woodlawn or WHS) is a public high school in the City of St. George, Louisiana. It is operated by the East Baton Rouge Parish School District.

It serves the southeast Baton Rouge area's public school needs for grades 9–12 and its 2006 enrollment was 1095 students.

== History ==
Prior to the incorporation of St. George, it was in Old Jefferson, a census-designated place in unincorporated East Baton Rouge Parish. St. George began its jurisdiction on April 26, 2024, and so the school is in the St. George city limits. The residents wanted to incorporate their own city so they would have a school system that they control.

In 2025 the EBR district continued to make plans to renovate the school, even as there was a plan for a referendum to create a separate school district for St. George, which would mean the high school would be taken out of the EBR district and into a new St. George school district.

== Communities served ==
Woodlawn serves various neighborhoods (which are former census-designated places or CDPs) in St. George: all of Old Jefferson, the Village St. George, most of Shenandoah, a northeast section of Oak Hills Place, and small eastern portions of Inniswold.

== Curriculum ==
Woodlawn requires that students register for a schedule of 8 classes per semester. The school is on an A/B Block schedule. They offer a mix of courses and credits to prepare students for college or vocational training. Woodlawn started a self-contained gifted and talented program in 2009. The school offers honors classes in English, Mathematics, Science, and Social Studies as well as Advanced Placement courses in Calculus, US History, European History, World History, Psychology, Spanish, French, Studio Art, English, Biology, Chemistry, Physics, Human Geography, and US Government.

Dual enrollment and concurrent enrollment with Baton Rouge Community College and Louisiana State University are also offered at Woodlawn. Students must be approved by the principal as well as meet the strict qualifications to be eligible to enroll. Both high school and college credits are awarded for students enrolled in these classes.

Woodlawn in cooperation with the United States Army also offers JROTC courses. The focus for the education is on leadership but also includes training in map reading, marksmanship, drill, and more. Woodlawn even boasts an indoor firing range for marksmanship practice with .177 caliber air rifles.

== Academics ==
During the 2011 - 2012 academic year, Woodlawn received a C rating on Louisiana's performance label index with a Baseline School Performance Score (SPS) of 101.5. The school has increased from its 2010-2011 performance score by 14.6 points, achieving its annual growth goal. Woodlawn's SPS score has increased each year from the 2008 - 2009 academic year. The school had an SPS of 81.1 for the 2008 - 2009 year, an SPS of 84.6 for the 2009 - 2010 year, 89.9 for the 2010 - 2011 year, and a 101.5 for the 2011 - 2012 year.

The school has an on-time graduation percentage of 72% exceeding both the district and state averages of 66.4% and 64.8% respectively. Woodlawn's integrated Louisiana Education Assessment Program (iLEAP) and Graduation Exit Exam (GEE) scores are slightly lower than state averages and slightly higher than district averages. Woodlawn also scores slightly lower than district, state, and national averages on American College Testing (ACT) scores (Composite: 19.3, English: 18.9, Math: 18.7, Reading: 19.2, Science: 19.7).

Of the teachers at Woodlawn who are instructing students in English, math, science, social studies, foreign language, and the high school arts, 94% meet the No Child Left Behind Act's Highly Qualified definition.

Other School Data
Class sizes

| Class Size | Percent of Classes |
|---|---|
| 1-20 | 29% |
| 21-26 | 26% |
| 27-33 | 42% |
| 33 or more | 3% |

Student distribution

| | Number | Percent |
|---|---|---|
| Total Students | 1095 | 100% |
| -Regular Education | 1030 | 94% |
| -Students with Disabilities | 65 | 6% |
| Students eligible for free lunch | 445 | 41% |

== Campus ==
Woodlawn's original campus was on Tiger Bend Road in Baton Rouge. The original school house and its accompanying buildings were unknowingly constructed on top of the Baton Rouge fault line and as a result the buildings were continuously moving. Cracks in the school were investigated in 1975 and estimates of 5 millimeters (0.20 in) per year. In 1996 the band and choir halls as well as the auditorium were condemned and classes were no longer permitted to take place in them as a result of structural movement.

Due largely in part to its age and location on the fault line and consequently as a result of the dilapidated buildings and approval by the tax payers, a new Woodlawn High School was constructed a few short miles away on a 57-acre (230,000 m^{2}) site. The new school opened its doors in 2003 and became the first new school to open in the parish in 30 years. As a result of the construction of a new school, the site of the original school was razed in 2004. The former location, although moved on the property, is now home to Woodlawn Middle School.

== Athletics ==
Woodlawn competes in Louisiana High School Athletics Association's (LHSAA) District 4 Class 5A.

The school competes in Baseball, Basketball, Bowling, Cross Country, Football, Golf, Powerlifting, Soccer, Softball, Swimming, Tennis, Track and Field, and Volleyball.

=== Championships ===
- The 2002–2003 boys basketball team garnered national attention after winning back-to-back state championships. The team to a #2 ranking in USA Today's national high school poll. State championships, in 1999, 2002, and 2003.
- The boys soccer team won the state championship in 1991.

== Notable alumni ==
- Brett Blackledge - 2007 Pulitzer Prize winner
- Rickie Collins - College football quarterback for the Syracuse Orange
- Chad Durbin - MLB pitcher for Philadelphia Phillies.
- Toni Graphia - TV writer/producer, Peabody Award winner
- Darnell Lazare - Professional basketball player
- Danielle Scott-Arruda - Four time U.S. indoor volleyball Olympian.

== Notable staff ==
- The athletics department is currently led by Co-Athletic Director Marcus Randall.
