= Old Jefferson, Louisiana =

Old Jefferson
- Neighborhood of St. George; Former census designated place
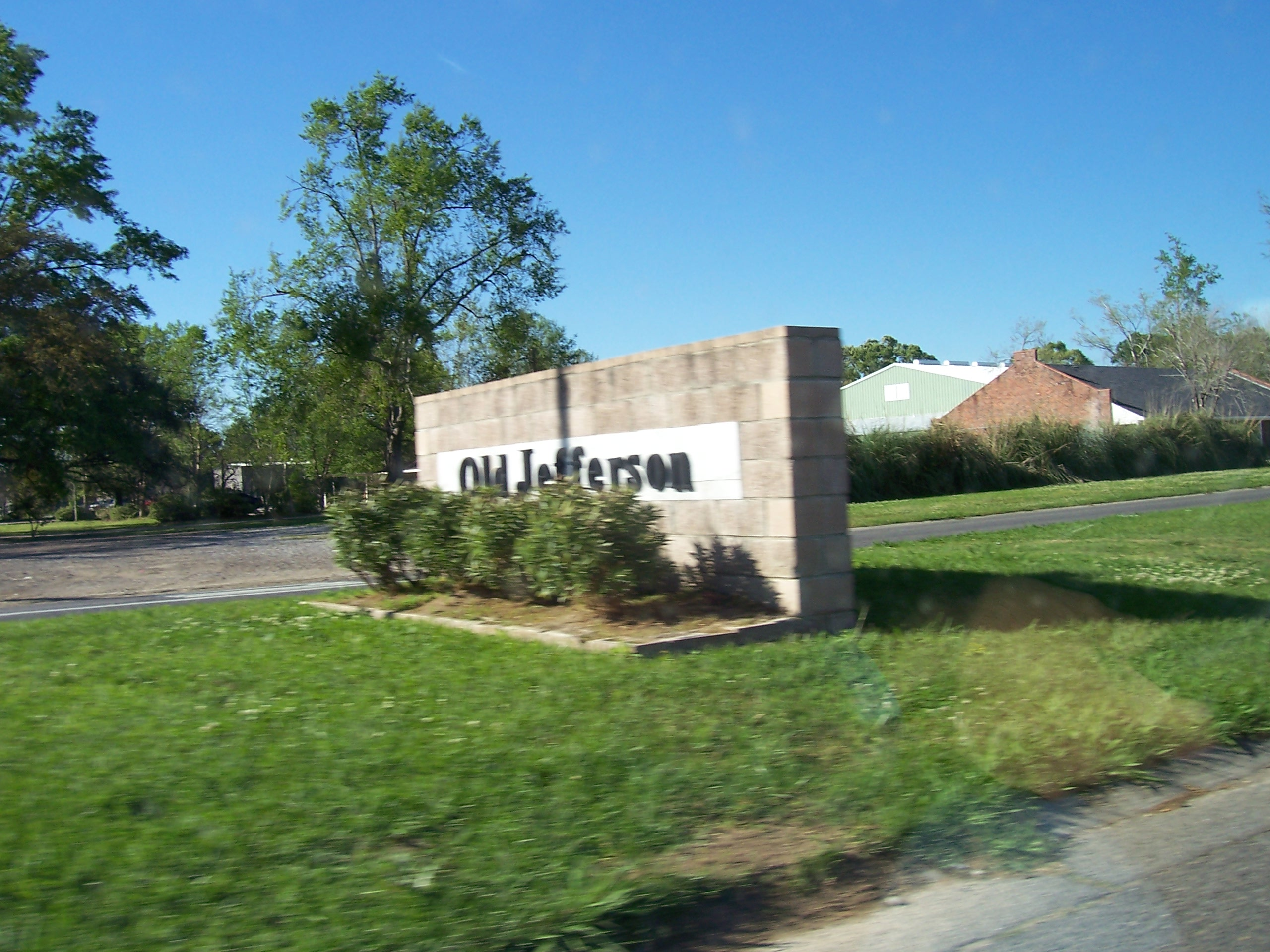

- Location in East Baton Rouge Parish and the state of Louisiana.
- Coordinates: 30°22′53″N 91°00′37″W
- Country: United States
- State: Louisiana
- Parish: East Baton Rouge

Area
  - Total: 3.52 sq mi (9.12 km^{2})
  - Land: 3.52 sq mi (9.12 km^{2})
  - Water: 0 sq mi (0.00 km^{2})
- Elevation: 30 ft (9.1 m)

Population (2020)
  - Total: 7,339
  - Density: 2,085.3/sq mi (805.12/km^{2})
- Time zone: UTC-6 (CST)
  - Summer (DST): UTC-5 (CDT)
- ZIP code: 70817
- Area code: 225
- FIPS code: 22-57705

For Old Jefferson in Jefferson Parish, Louisiana, see: Jefferson, Louisiana

Old Jefferson is a neighborhood of St. George and former census designated place in East Baton Rouge Parish, Louisiana, United States. The population was 7,339 at the 2020 census. It is part of the Baton Rouge Metropolitan Statistical Area, within the city of St. George.

== Geography ==
Old Jefferson is located at 30°22′53″N 91°0′37″W (30.381292, -91.010376).

According to the United States Census Bureau, the CDP has a total area of 3.5 square miles (9.1 km^{2}), all land.

== Demographics ==
Historical population
Census	Pop.	Note	%±
1990	4,531		—
2000	5,631		24.3%
2010	6,980		24.0%
2020	7,339		5.1%
U.S. Decennial Census; 1960 1970 1980; 1990 2000 2010

Old Jefferson was first listed as a census designated place in the 1990 U.S. census. It was deleted after the 2020 U.S. census after being absorbed into the newly formed city of St. George.

Old Jefferson, Louisiana – Racial and ethnic composition Note: the US Census treats Hispanic/Latino as an ethnic category. This table excludes Latinos from the racial categories and assigns them to a separate category. Hispanics/Latinos may be of any race.
Race / Ethnicity (NH = Non-Hispanic)	Pop 2000	Pop 2010	Pop 2020	% 2000	% 2010	% 2020
White alone (NH)	5,037	5,388	4,727	89.45%	77.19%	64.41%
Black or African American alone (NH)	319	876	1,469	5.67%	12.55%	20.02%
Native American or Alaska Native alone (NH)	20	29	16	0.36%	0.42%	0.22%
Asian alone (NH)	107	195	238	1.90%	2.79%	3.24%
Native Hawaiian or Pacific Islander alone (NH)	4	8	2	0.07%	0.11%	0.03%
Other race alone (NH)	1	11	42	0.02%	0.16%	0.57%
Mixed race or Multiracial (NH)	55	100	255	0.98%	1.43%	3.47%
Hispanic or Latino (any race)	88	373	590	1.56%	5.34%	8.04%
Total	5,631	6,980	7,339	100.00%	100.00%	100.00%

As of the 2020 United States census, there were 7,339 people, 2,772 households, and 2,021 families residing in the CDP.

As of the census of 2000, there were 5,631 people, 2,044 households, and 1,582 families residing in the CDP. The population density was 1,594.7 inhabitants per square mile (615.7/km^{2}). There were 2,110 housing units at an average density of 597.6 per square mile (230.7/km^{2}). The racial makeup of the CDP was 90.37% White, 5.68% African American, 0.39% Native American, 1.90% Asian, 0.07% Pacific Islander, 0.44% from other races, and 1.14% from two or more races. Hispanic or Latino of any race were 1.56% of the population.

There were 2,044 households, out of which 45.5% had children under the age of 18 living with them, 62.9% were married couples living together, 10.4% had a female householder with no husband present, and 22.6% were non-families. 17.9% of all households were made up of individuals, and 3.1% had someone living alone who was 65 years of age or older. The average household size was 2.75 and the average family size was 3.15.

In the CDP, the population was spread out, with 29.4% under the age of 18, 8.1% from 18 to 24, 36.8% from 25 to 44, 21.0% from 45 to 64, and 4.6% who were 65 years of age or older. The median age was 32 years. For every 100 females, there were 98.4 males. For every 100 females age 18 and over, there were 93.8 males.

The median income for a household in the CDP was $52,220, and the median income for a family was $59,778. Males had a median income of $41,164 versus $27,044 for females. The per capita income for the CDP was $21,410. About 2.3% of families and 3.7% of the population were below the poverty line, including 4.8% of those under age 18 and none of those age 65 or over.

== Education ==
=== Public schools ===
Old Jefferson is served by East Baton Rouge Parish Public Schools.

Zoned schools include:

- Woodlawn Elementary School in Old Jefferson serves almost all of the community while a small segment to the north is zoned to Shenandoah Elementary School in Shenandoah
- Woodlawn Middle School in Shenandoah
- Woodlawn High School in Old Jefferson

In previous eras Parkview Elementary School served the northern half of Old Jefferson, while Jefferson Terrace Elementary School served the southern section of Old Jefferson.

=== Private schools ===
Private schools in the area include:

- Most Blessed Sacrament Catholic School (PK-8) in Old Jefferson
- St. Michael the Archangel High School (9–12) in Shenandoah

The district provides transportation to these two private Catholic schools.
