= East Baton Rouge Parish, Louisiana =

Parish in Louisiana, United States

Coordinates: 30.54°N 91.09°W

- Parish
- Parish of East Baton Rouge; Paroisse de Bâton-Rouge Est (French); Parroquia del Este de Bastón Rojo (Spanish)
- Flag
- Nickname: EBR
- Location within the U.S. state of Louisiana

- Louisiana's location within the U.S.
- Country: United States
- State: Louisiana
- Region: Florida Parishes
- Metro: Baton Rouge
- Founded year: 1812
- Parish seat (and largest city): Baton Rouge

Area
  - Total: 470 sq mi (1,200 km^{2})
  - Land: 455 sq mi (1,180 km^{2})
  - Water: 15 sq mi (39 km^{2}) 3.2%

Population (2020)
  - Total: 456,781
  - Estimate (2025): 456,180 ▼
  - Rank: LA: 1st
  - Density: 1,000/sq mi (388/km^{2})
- Time zone: UTC-6 (CST)
  - Summer (DST): UTC-5 (CDT)
- Districts: 5th, 6th
- Website: Parish of East Baton Rouge

East Baton Rouge Parish (French: Paroisse de Bâton-Rouge Est; Spanish: Parroquia del Este de Bastón Rojo) is the most populous parish in the U.S. state of Louisiana. Its population was 456,781 at the 2020 census. The parish seat is Baton Rouge, Louisiana's state capital. East Baton Rouge Parish is located within the Greater Baton Rouge area.

== Geography ==
According to the U.S. Census Bureau, the parish has a total area of 470 sq mi (1,200 km^{2}), of which 15 sq mi (39 km^{2}) (3.2%) are covered by water.

=== Bodies of water ===
- Amite River
- Bayou Manchac
- Comite River
- Mississippi River
- Thompson Creek

=== Major highways ===
- Interstate 10
  - Interstate 110
- Interstate 12
- U.S. Highway 61
- U.S. Highway 190
  - US 61 Bus. / US 190 Bus.
- Louisiana Highway 19
- Louisiana Highway 30
- Louisiana Highway 37
- Louisiana Highway 42
- Louisiana Highway 64
  - Louisiana Highway 64-1
- Louisiana Highway 67
- Louisiana Highway 73
- Louisiana Highway 327
- Louisiana Highway 408
- Louisiana Highway 409
- Louisiana Highway 410
- Louisiana Highway 423
- Louisiana Highway 427
- Louisiana Highway 946
- Louisiana Highway 948
- Louisiana Highway 964
- Louisiana Highway 3006
- Louisiana Highway 3034
- Louisiana Highway 3045
- Louisiana Highway 3064
- Louisiana Highway 3164
- Louisiana Highway 3290-1
- Louisiana Highway 3290-4

=== Adjacent parishes ===
- East Feliciana Parish (north)
- West Feliciana Parish (northwest)
- West Baton Rouge Parish (west)
- Iberville Parish (south)
- Ascension Parish (southeast)
- Livingston Parish (east)
- St. Helena Parish (northeast)

== Communities ==
=== Cities ===
- Baker
- Baton Rouge (parish seat and largest municipality)
- Central
- St. George
- Zachary

=== Census-designated places ===
- Brownfields
- Gardere
- Merrydale
- Monticello

=== Former census-designated places ===
- Inniswold (absorbed into the city of St. George after the 2020 U.S. census)
- Oak Hills Place (absorbed into the city of St. George after the 2020 U.S. Census)
- Old Jefferson (absorbed into the city of St. George after the 2020 U.S. Census)
- Shenandoah (absorbed into the city of St. George after the 2020 U.S. Census)
- Village St. George (absorbed into the city of St. George after the 2020 U.S. Census)
- Westminster (absorbed into the city of St. George after the 2020 U.S. Census)

=== Unincorporated communities ===
- Baywood
- Greenwell Springs
- Port Hudson
- Pride

== Demographics ==
Historical population
Census	Pop.	Note	%±
1810	1,468		—
1820	5,220		255.6%
1830	6,698		28.3%
1840	8,133		21.4%
1850	11,977		47.3%
1860	16,046		34.0%
1870	17,816		11.0%
1880	19,966		12.1%
1890	25,922		29.8%
1900	31,153		20.2%
1910	34,580		11.0%
1920	44,513		28.7%
1930	68,208		53.2%
1940	88,415		29.6%
1950	158,236		79.0%
1960	230,058		45.4%
1970	285,167		24.0%
1980	366,191		28.4%
1990	380,105		3.8%
2000	412,852		8.6%
2010	440,171		6.6%
2020	456,781		3.8%
2025 (est.)	456,180	▼	−0.1%
U.S. Decennial Census; 1790-1960 1900-1990; 1990-2000 2010

East Baton Rouge Parish, Louisiana – Racial and ethnic composition Note: the US Census treats Hispanic/Latino as an ethnic category. This table excludes Latinos from the racial categories and assigns them to a separate category. Hispanics/Latinos may be of any race.
Race / Ethnicity (NH = Non-Hispanic)	Pop 1980	Pop 1990	Pop 2000	Pop 2010	Pop 2020	% 1980	% 1990	% 2000	% 2010	% 2020
White alone (NH)	246,341	240,961	227,445	206,664	191,355	67.27%	63.39%	55.09%	46.95%	41.89%
Black or African American alone (NH)	114,741	132,402	164,853	198,590	205,552	31.33%	34.83%	39.93%	45.12%	45.00%
Native American or Alaska Native alone (NH)	505	619	793	923	773	0.14%	0.16%	0.19%	0.21%	0.17%
Asian alone (NH)	2,368	4,955	8,534	12,290	14,388	0.65%	1.30%	2.07%	2.79%	3.15%
Native Hawaiian or Pacific Islander alone (NH)	x	22	54	86	106	x	0.01%	0.03%	0.02%	0.02%
Other race alone (NH)	2,171	1,146	427	616	1,564	0.59%	0.30%	0.10%	0.14%	0.34%
Mixed race or Multiracial (NH)	x	x	3,328	4,728	12,492	x	x	0.81%	1.07%	2.73%
Hispanic or Latino (any race)	6,306	5,421	7,363	16,274	30,551	1.72%	1.43%	1.78%	3.70%	6.69%
Total	366,191	380,105	412,852	440,171	456,781	100.00%	100.00%	100.00%	100.00%	100.00%

As of the 2020 United States census, there were 456,781 people, 161,536 households, and 95,243 families residing in the parish. The 2019 American Community Survey estimated 443,763 people lived in East Baton Rouge, up from 440,171 at the 2010 United States census. Of the population, 5.7% were foreign-born, and 8.3% spoke a language other than English at home. There were 164,346 households and 45,760 businesses operating in the parish.

At the 2019 census estimates, the racial and ethnic makeup of East Baton Rouge Parish was 46.8% non-Hispanic white, 46.1% Black and African American, 0.2% American Indian and Alaska Native, 3.2% Asian alone, 1.8% some other race, and 1.9% two or more races; Hispanic and Latin Americans of any race made up 4.2% of the total population. In 2010, the racial and ethnic makeup of the parish was 45.9% Black and African American, 49.5% White American, 0.3% American Indian and Alaska Native, 3.0% Asian, 0.12% Pacific Islander, 1.02% from other races, and 1.2% from two or more races. About 3.8% of the population were Hispanic or Latin American of any race.

Of the 164,346 households at the 2019 American Community Survey, there were 6.6% of people aged 5 and under; 77.2% were aged 18 and older, and 13.7% were 65 and older. The median age of East Baton Rouge was 34, up from 32 at the 2010 U.S. census. In 2010, for every 100 females, there were 91.90 males. For every 100 females age 18 and over, there were 87.50 males.

In the parish, the median household income was $54,948 and there were 194,326 housing units. East Baton Rouge Parish had a home-ownership rate of 59.8%, and the median value of an owner-occupied housing unit was $194,000. The median gross rent for residents was $933. Males had a median income of $55,862 versus $38,817 for females.

An estimated 61.2% of the parish was employed, and of the 45,760 businesses, 19,537 were minority-owned. Veteran-owned businesses numbered approximately 4,637.

== Education ==
=== Primary and secondary education ===
Most sections of the parish are zoned to schools in East Baton Rouge Parish School System. Baker residents attend the City of Baker School System. Zachary residents and residents of unincorporated areas around Zachary attend the Zachary Community School Board. Central residents, and those of a section of Brownfields, as well as some other unincorporated areas, attend the Central Community School System schools.

The State of Louisiana also operates the Louisiana School for the Visually Impaired and Louisiana School for the Deaf.

The Roman Catholic Diocese of Baton Rouge operates Catholic parochial schools.

=== Other education ===
East Baton Rouge Parish Library is the public library system. The parish is in the service area of Baton Rouge Community College.

== Government ==
The city of Baton Rouge and the Parish of East Baton Rouge have been run by a consolidated government since 1947, which combined the city of Baton Rouge government with the rural areas of the parish. The city and parish are served by the metropolitan council and the mayor-president.

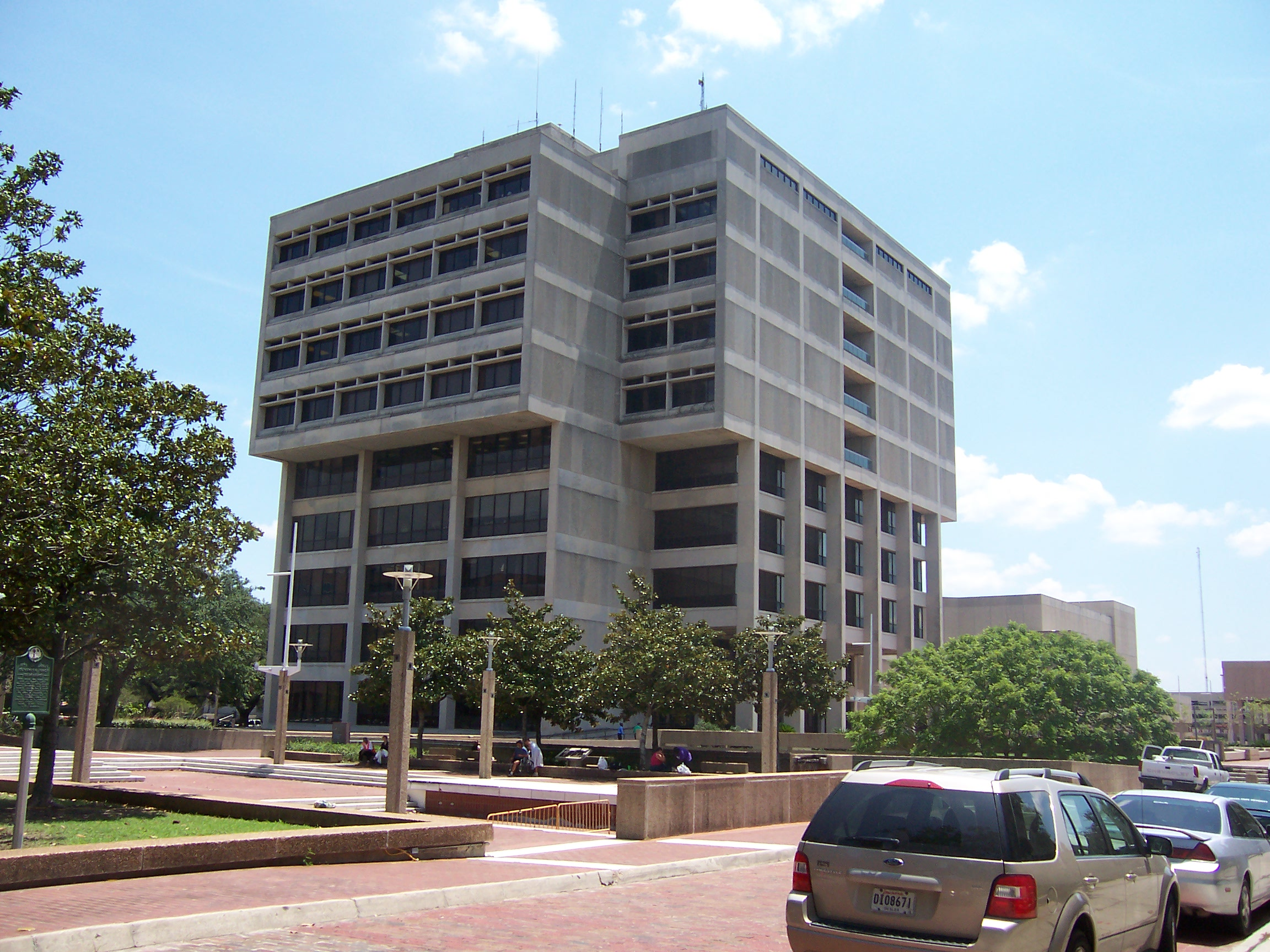
Baton Rouge Governmental Building and former Courthouse (St. Louis Street)

The parish courthouse in Baton Rouge is one of 26 public buildings constructed by contractor George A. Caldwell in the 1930s.

In 2010, the 19th Judicial District Court moved into the new courthouse on North Blvd.

The Jetson Center for Youth, a former juvenile prison operated by the Louisiana Office of Juvenile Justice, is located near Baker in an unincorporated area.

== Politics ==
Since 1980, East Baton Rouge Parish has been a bellwether in presidential elections, voting for the winner of the presidency in all but three elections (it voted for George H. W. Bush in 1992, Hillary Clinton in 2016, and Kamala Harris in 2024) but not necessarily the winner of Louisiana. In 2008, the parish voted for Democrat Barack Obama, who won 51% of the vote and 99,652 votes. Republican John McCain won 48% of the votes and 95,390 votes. In the 2008 Senate election, Democrat Mary Landrieu, who kept her seat as a U.S. Senator, won 57% of the vote and 110,694 votes in East Baton Rouge Parish. Republican John Neely Kennedy won 41% of the vote and 80,222 votes. In the 2004 presidential election, East Baton Rouge Parish cast the majority of its votes for Republican George W. Bush, who won 54% of the votes and 99,943 votes. Democrat John F. Kerry won 45% of the votes and 82,298 votes.

In 2016, John Kennedy lost East Baton Rouge Parish in his otherwise highly successful U.S. Senate race against Democratic Louisiana Public Service Commissioner Foster Campbell, who prevailed 52% to 48%. By a nearly identical margin, Democrat Sharon Weston Broome defeated Republican Bodi White to claim the Baton Rouge mayor-president position to succeed Democrat Kip Holden. In 2024, Republican Sid Edwards defeated Weston-Broome to retake the mayoralty of Baton Rouge.

United States presidential election results for East Baton Rouge Parish, Louisiana
Year	Republican		Democratic		Third party(ies)	
Year	No.	%	No.	%	No.	%
1912	45	3.60%	1,067	85.43%	137	10.97%
1916	130	7.89%	1,482	89.98%	35	2.13%
1920	442	15.91%	2,336	84.09%	0	0.00%
1924	611	18.00%	2,764	81.44%	19	0.56%
1928	2,995	39.56%	4,575	60.44%	0	0.00%
1932	1,045	14.04%	6,363	85.51%	33	0.44%
1936	1,069	9.74%	9,911	90.26%	0	0.00%
1940	1,762	11.70%	13,303	88.30%	0	0.00%
1944	3,025	17.01%	14,757	82.99%	0	0.00%
1948	4,585	21.35%	8,569	39.91%	8,319	38.74%
1952	19,693	46.01%	23,105	53.99%	0	0.00%
1956	24,018	56.74%	17,072	40.33%	1,241	2.93%
1960	17,749	31.45%	26,326	46.65%	12,360	21.90%
1964	36,964	58.57%	26,152	41.43%	0	0.00%
1968	21,661	27.53%	21,770	27.67%	35,250	44.80%
1972	52,648	65.37%	23,617	29.32%	4,277	5.31%
1976	51,655	49.76%	49,956	48.12%	2,196	2.12%
1980	71,063	53.36%	57,442	43.13%	4,663	3.50%
1984	95,704	62.44%	56,673	36.98%	891	0.58%
1988	86,791	58.81%	59,270	40.16%	1,523	1.03%
1992	81,072	48.64%	68,622	41.17%	16,997	10.20%
1996	77,811	45.60%	83,493	48.93%	9,343	5.48%
2000	89,128	52.74%	76,516	45.28%	3,345	1.98%
2004	99,943	54.42%	82,298	44.81%	1,401	0.76%
2008	95,390	48.34%	99,652	50.50%	2,307	1.17%
2012	92,292	46.57%	102,656	51.80%	3,223	1.63%
2016	84,660	43.09%	102,828	52.33%	9,003	4.58%
2020	88,420	42.47%	115,577	55.52%	4,185	2.01%
2024	82,720	43.39%	103,820	54.46%	4,103	2.15%

== Law enforcement ==
The East Baton Rouge Parish Sheriff's Office employs approximately 850 deputies, making it one of the largest law enforcement agencies in the state of Louisiana. Notable past sheriffs include politician Philemon Thomas; baseball player Terry Felton became a captain in the department after retiring from sports.

Other law enforcement agencies in the parish include:

- Baton Rouge Police Department
- Baton Rouge City Constable (Ward 1)
- Baton Rouge Metropolitan Airport Police Department
- Baker Police Department
- Baker City Marshall
- Zachary Police Department
- City of Central Police Department
- Louisiana State University Police Department
- Baton Rouge Community College Police Department
- Southern University Police Department
- East Baton Rouge Parish Constable - Ward 2, District 1
- East Baton Rouge Parish Constable - Ward 2, District 2
- East Baton Rouge Parish Constable - Ward 2, District 3
- East Baton Rouge Parish Constable - Ward 3, District 1
- East Baton Rouge Parish Constable - Ward 3, District 2
- East Baton Rouge Parish Constable - Ward 3, District 3

== National Guard ==
The 769th Engineer Battalion (Combat) a unit of the 225th Engineer Brigade is located in East Baton Rouge Parish. Two companies of this battalion deployed to Iraq in 2007–2008. Another company-sized unit, the 927TH Sapper Company, deployed to Afghanistan in 2008–2009. As of 2011, yet another company, the 926TH Mobility Augmentation Company located in Baker has been alerted for overseas deployment. The 769th Engineers have two other companies, the 922nd Horizontal Engineer Company located in Gonzales, Louisiana, and the 928th Sapper Company located in Napoleonville, Louisiana.

== Healthcare ==
Major hospitals include:

- Baton Rouge General Bluebonnet
- Baton Rouge General Mid-City
- Ochsner Medical Center - Baton Rouge
- Our Lady of the Lake Regional Medical Center
- Our Lady of the Lake Children's Hospital
- Woman's Hospital

Emergency Medical Services in EBR Parish are provided by East Baton Rouge EMS and Acadian Ambulance.

== See also ==
- National Register of Historic Places listings in East Baton Rouge Parish, Louisiana
