= 2022 United States Senate election in Louisiana =

- November 8, 2022

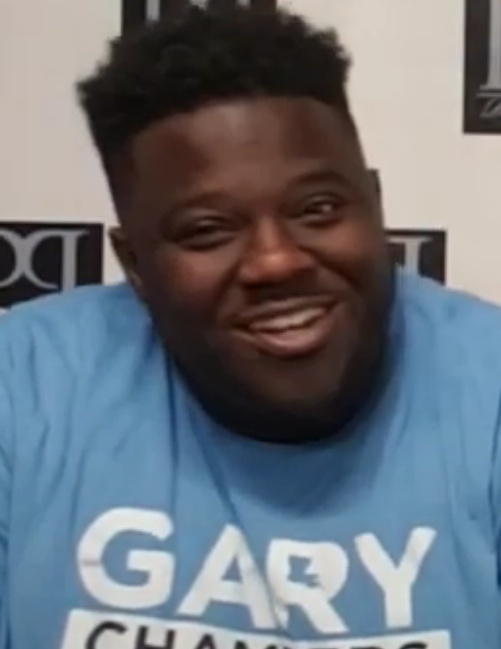

Candidate	John Kennedy	Gary Chambers	Luke Mixon
Party	Republican	Democratic	Democratic
Popular vote	851,568	246,933	182,887
Percentage	61.56%	17.85%	13.22%
- Kennedy: 30–40% 40–50% 50–60% 60–70% 70–80% 80–90% >90% Chambers: 20–30% 30–40% 40–50% 50–60% 60–70% 70–80% 80–90% >90% Mixon: 20–30% 30–40% 40–50% 50–60% 60–70% >90% Steib: 40–50% 50–60% Billiot: >90% Tie: 20–30% 30–40% 40–50% No votes
U.S. senator before election
John Kennedy
Republican
Elected U.S. Senator
John Kennedy
Republican

The 2022 United States Senate election in Louisiana was held on November 8, 2022, to elect a member of the United States Senate to represent the State of Louisiana. Incumbent Republican U.S. senator John Kennedy was first elected in 2016. He ran for re-election to a second term, and was re-elected after receiving a majority of votes in the first round.

Kennedy won White voters (79% to 9%), while Chambers and Mixon both won a split majority of African Americans (48% to 24% to 16%).

== Candidates ==
=== Republican Party ===
==== Declared ====
- Devin Lance Graham, business owner and real estate broker
- John Kennedy, incumbent U.S. senator

=== Democratic Party ===
==== Declared ====
- Gary Chambers, activist, candidate for Louisiana's 15th State Senate district in 2019, and candidate for Louisiana's 2nd congressional district in 2021
- MV "Vinny" Mendoza, perennial candidate
- Luke Mixon, member of the U.S. Navy Reserve and former member of the U.S. Navy
- Salvador P. Rodriguez, store manager
- Syrita Steib, nonprofit executive and criminal justice reform advocate

==== Declined ====
- John Bel Edwards, governor of Louisiana (endorsed Mixon)
- Helena Moreno, president of the New Orleans City Council and former state representative (endorsed Chambers)

=== Libertarian Party ===
- Aaron C. Sigler, neurosurgeon and candidate for U.S. Senate in 2020

=== Nonpartisans and independents ===
==== Declared ====
- Beryl A. Billiot, businessman and perennial candidate
- Alexander "Xan" John, businessman, law student and candidate for U.S. Senate in 2020
- Bradley McMorris, realtor
- W. Thomas La Fontaine Olson, author, advocate and 2020 U.S. House candidate in Illinois
- Thomas Wenn

== Endorsements ==
Gary Chambers (D)

U.S. representatives

- Troy Carter, U.S. representative from Louisiana's 2nd congressional district (2021–present)

State legislators

- Edward James, former Louisiana state representative from the 101st district (2012–2022)

Local officials

- Helena Moreno, president of New Orleans City Council (2019–2023) and former Louisiana state representative from the 93rd district (2010–2018)
- JP Morrell, New Orleans city councilor (2022–present)
- Oliver Thomas, New Orleans city councilor (1994–2007, 2022–2026)

Newspapers

- The New Orleans Tribune

Organizations

- Louisiana Democratic Party (co-endorsed with Mixon and Steib)
- Our Black Party
John Kennedy (R)

U.S. executive branch officials

- Donald Trump, 45th president of the United States (2017–2021)

U.S. representatives

- Julia Letlow, U.S. representative from Louisiana's 5th congressional district (2021–present)

Organizations

- Animal Wellness Action
- Campaign for Working Families
- Citizens Against Government Waste
- ClearPath Action Fund
- Louisiana Republican Party
- National Federation of Independent Business
- National Rifle Association - Political Victory Fund
- National Right to Life Committee
- U.S. Chamber of Commerce
Luke Mixon (D)

State officials

- John Bel Edwards, governor of Louisiana (2016–2024)

State legislators

- Kenny Ray Cox, state representative from the 23rd district (2012–2024)
- Sam Jenkins, state representative from the 2nd district (2016–2024)
- C. Denise Marcelle, state representative from the 61st district (2016–present)

Organizations

- Louisiana Democratic Party (co-endorsed with Chambers and Steib)
- Louisiana Federation of Teachers
- National Education Association – Louisiana
- The Steady State
- VoteVets.org
Syrita Steib (D)

Organizations

- Louisiana Democratic Party (co-endorsed with Mixon and Chambers)

== General election ==
=== Predictions ===
Source	Ranking	As of
The Cook Political Report	Solid R	November 19, 2021
Inside Elections	Solid R	January 7, 2022
Sabato's Crystal Ball	Safe R	November 3, 2021
Politico	Solid R	April 1, 2022
RCP	Safe R	January 10, 2022
Fox News	Solid R	May 12, 2022
DDHQ	Solid R	July 20, 2022
538	Solid R (Kennedy)	June 30, 2022
The Economist	Safe R	September 7, 2022

=== Polling ===
Poll source	Date(s) administered	Sample size (Note: Key: A – all adults RV – registered voters LV – likely voters V – unclear)	Margin of error	Gary Chambers (D)	John Kennedy (R)	Luke Mixon (D)	Syrita Steib (D)	Other	Undecided
Public Policy Polling (D)	October 10–11, 2022	633 (RV)	–	8%	53%	16%	6%	2% (Note: "Someone else" with 2%)	14%
Echelon Insights	August 31 – September 7, 2022	506 (RV)	± 6.5%	16%	51%	8%	6%	–	19%
JMC Analytics (R)	March 21–23, 2022	600 (LV)	± 4.0%	14%	53%	7%	3%	–	23%

Hypothetical polling

Runoff election
Generic Republican vs. generic Democrat

Poll source	Date(s) administered	Sample size	Margin of error	Generic Republican	Generic Democrat	Undecided
JMC Analytics (R)	March 21–23, 2022	600 (LV)	± 4.0%	51%	33%	16%

=== Results ===
2022 United States Senate election in Louisiana
Party	Candidate	Votes	%
Republican	John Kennedy (incumbent)	851,568	61.56%
Democratic	Gary Chambers	246,933	17.85%
Democratic	Luke Mixon	182,887	13.22%
Democratic	Syrita Steib	31,568	2.28%
Republican	Devin Lance Graham	25,275	1.83%
Democratic	MV "Vinny" Mendoza	11,910	0.86%
Independent	Beryl Billiot	9,378	0.68%
Democratic	Salvador P. Rodriguez	7,767	0.56%
Independent	Bradley McMorris	5,388	0.39%
Libertarian	Aaron C. Sigler	4,865	0.35%
Independent	Alexander "Xan" John	2,753	0.20%
Independent	W. Thomas La Fontaine Olson	1,676	0.12%
Independent	Thomas Wenn	1,322	0.10%
Total votes		1,383,290	100.00%
Republican hold			

==== By parish ====
Parish	John Kennedy Republican		Gary Chambers Democratic		Luke Mixon Democratic		Syrita Steib Democratic		Various candidates Other parties		Margin		Total
Parish	#	%	#	%	#	%	#	%	#	%	#	%	Total
Acadia	15,864	80.7%	1,687	8.6%	926	4.7%	176	0.9%	994	5.1%	14,177	74.1%	19,647
Allen	5,033	78.8%	541	8.5%	432	6.8%	34	0.5%	346	5.4%	4,492	70.3%	6,386
Ascension	27,149	66.6%	6,370	15.6%	4,253	10.4%	882	2.2%	2,122	5.2%	20,779	51.0%	40,776
Assumption	5,126	67.0%	1,256	16.4%	643	8.4%	225	2.9%	405	5.3%	3,870	50.6%	7,655
Avoyelles	8,102	70.9%	936	8.2%	1,788	15.7%	81	0.7%	515	4.5%	6,314	55.2% (Note: Compares margin over Mixon.)	11,422
Beauregard	8,979	82.9%	622	5.7%	562	5.2%	78	0.7%	589	5.4%	8,357	77.2%	10,830
Bienville	2,704	56.7%	957	20.1%	687	14.4%	91	1.9%	330	6.9%	1,747	36.6%	4,769
Bossier	23,910	74.3%	3,751	11.7%	2,765	8.6%	388	1.2%	1,367	4.2%	20,159	62.6%	32,181
Caddo	33,687	50.8%	15,902	24.0%	10,486	15.8%	1,799	2.7%	4,475	6.7%	17,785	26.8%	66,349
Calcasieu	36,865	68.7%	7,401	13.8%	5,186	9.7%	817	1.5%	3,404	6.3%	29,464	54.9%	53,673
Caldwell	2,738	85.1%	151	4.7%	201	6.2%	14	0.4%	115	3.6%	2,537	78.9%	3,219
Cameron	2,158	88.2%	52	2.1%	85	3.5%	6	0.2%	146	6.0%	2,062	84.7%	2,447
Catahoula	2,590	72.6%	411	11.5%	312	8.7%	68	1.9%	187	5.2%	2,179	61.1%	3,568
Claiborne	2,898	65.5%	811	18.3%	380	8.6%	51	1.2%	285	6.4%	2,087	47.2%	4,425
Concordia	3,912	65.8%	781	13.1%	860	14.5%	66	1.1%	328	5.5%	3,052	51.3%	5,947
De Soto	6,284	68.0%	1,236	13.4%	758	8.2%	593	6.4%	376	4.1%	5,048	54.6%	9,247
East Baton Rouge	63,024	46.0%	41,303	30.1%	24,508	17.9%	2,567	1.9%	5,677	4.1%	21,721	15.9%	137,079
East Carroll	833	42.0%	630	31.8%	319	16.1%	45	2.3%	156	7.9%	203	10.2%	1,983
East Feliciana	4,560	61.4%	1,630	21.9%	803	10.8%	105	1.4%	332	4.5%	2,930	39.5%	7,430
Evangeline	7,841	70.5%	1,524	13.7%	685	6.2%	119	1.1%	947	8.5%	6,317	56.8%	11,116
Franklin	4,871	79.2%	582	9.5%	457	7.4%	26	0.4%	213	3.5%	4,289	69.7%	6,149
Grant	5,550	87.4%	250	3.9%	256	4.0%	43	0.7%	251	4.0%	5,294	83.4%	6,350
Iberia	13,796	70.3%	2,908	14.8%	1,565	8.0%	271	1.4%	1,092	5.6%	10,888	55.5%	19,632
Iberville	6,196	51.0%	3,696	30.4%	1,382	11.4%	174	1.4%	706	5.8%	2,500	20.6%	12,154
Jackson	4,045	71.3%	655	11.6%	671	11.8%	56	1.0%	243	4.3%	3,374	59.5%	5,670
Jefferson	68,954	58.3%	19,705	16.7%	18,343	15.5%	5,131	4.3%	6,050	5.1%	49,249	41.6%	118,183
Jefferson Davis	7,965	78.8%	885	8.8%	614	6.1%	72	0.7%	573	5.7%	7,080	70.0%	10,109
La Salle	4,486	90.0%	141	2.8%	168	3.4%	13	0.3%	175	3.5%	4,318	86.6%	4,983
Lafayette	48,435	66.9%	11,967	16.5%	6,967	9.6%	991	1.4%	4,084	5.6%	36,468	50.4%	72,444
Lafourche	24,016	79.6%	2,032	6.7%	2,253	7.5%	324	1.1%	1,552	5.1%	21,763	72.1%	30,177
Lincoln	8,155	64.8%	1,869	14.9%	1,831	14.6%	170	1.4%	558	4.4%	6,286	49.9%	12,583
Livingston	35,213	83.3%	2,469	5.8%	2,552	6.0%	169	0.4%	1,868	4.4%	32,661	77.3%	42,271
Madison	1,419	52.1%	697	25.6%	381	14.0%	65	2.4%	164	6.0%	722	46.5%	2,726
Morehouse	4,455	62.0%	1,336	18.6%	919	12.8%	97	1.3%	382	5.3%	3,119	43.4%	7,189
Natchitoches	6,600	64.1%	1,607	15.6%	1,500	14.6%	146	1.4%	441	4.3%	4,993	48.5%	10,294
Orleans	17,931	16.2%	45,713	41.2%	36,498	32.9%	6,186	5.6%	4,657	4.2%	-9,215	-8.3%	110,985
Ouachita	28,727	66.7%	6,239	14.5%	5,777	13.4%	485	1.1%	1,824	4.2%	22,488	52.2%	43,052
Plaquemines	5,398	68.6%	1,101	14.0%	680	8.6%	155	2.0%	535	6.8%	4,297	54.6%	7,869
Pointe Coupee	6,039	62.7%	1,727	17.9%	1,204	12.5%	177	1.8%	484	5.0%	4,312	44.8%	9,631
Rapides	27,110	69.4%	5,384	13.8%	4,218	10.8%	523	1.3%	1,844	4.7%	21,726	55.6%	39,079
Red River	1,714	68.9%	379	15.2%	231	9.3%	37	1.5%	127	5.1%	1,335	43.7%	2,488
Richland	4,771	71.0%	935	13.9%	566	8.4%	69	1.0%	378	5.6%	3,836	57.1%	6,719
Sabine	6,316	84.3%	444	5.9%	347	4.6%	37	0.5%	344	4.6%	5,872	78.4%	7,488
St. Bernard	6,950	64.7%	1,708	15.9%	1,189	11.1%	198	1.8%	694	6.5%	5,242	40.8%	10,739
St. Charles	11,876	65.9%	2,663	14.8%	2,074	11.5%	583	3.2%	820	4.6%	9,213	51.1%	18,016
St. Helena	2,034	48.8%	925	22.2%	854	20.5%	77	1.8%	280	6.7%	1,109	26.6%	4,170
St. James	4,468	50.6%	1,385	15.7%	818	9.3%	1,841	20.8%	326	3.7%	2,627	29.8% (Note: Compares margin over Steib.)	8,838
St. John the Baptist	4,457	38.3%	3,475	29.8%	1,658	14.2%	1,469	12.6%	584	5.0%	982	8.5%	11,643
St. Landry	16,217	60.2%	5,507	20.4%	2,839	10.5%	429	1.6%	1,950	7.2%	10,710	38.8%	26,942
St. Martin	12,317	71.8%	2,527	14.7%	1,076	6.3%	219	1.3%	1,005	5.9%	9,790	57.1%	17,144
St. Mary	9,755	67.5%	2,289	15.8%	1,212	8.4%	223	1.5%	982	6.8%	7,466	51.7%	14,461
St. Tammany	68,694	72.6%	8,520	9.0%	11,821	12.5%	1,184	1.3%	4,436	4.7%	56,873	60.1%	94,655
Tangipahoa	24,754	69.8%	4,402	12.4%	3,847	10.8%	501	1.4%	1,985	5.6%	20,352	57.4%	35,489
Tensas	900	54.5%	380	23.0%	223	13.5%	24	1.5%	125	7.6%	520	41.0%	1,652
Terrebonne	20,731	75.8%	2,362	8.6%	2,499	9.1%	305	1.1%	1,469	5.4%	18,232	66.7%	27,366
Union	6,070	79.0%	574	7.5%	709	9.2%	38	0.5%	289	3.8%	5,361	69.8%	7,680
Vermilion	14,573	81.2%	1,321	7.4%	989	5.5%	117	0.7%	953	5.3%	13,252	73.8%	17,953
Vernon	9,413	83.8%	658	5.9%	528	4.7%	95	0.8%	545	4.8%	8,755	77.9%	11,239
Washington	9,020	68.5%	2,034	15.4%	1,170	8.9%	163	1.2%	784	6.0%	6,986	43.1%	13,171
Webster	8,188	68.3%	1,931	16.1%	1,006	8.4%	229	1.9%	636	5.3%	6,257	52.2%	11,990
West Baton Rouge	5,815	57.6%	2,607	25.8%	1,086	10.7%	169	1.7%	427	4.2%	3,208	21.8%	10,104
West Carroll	2,964	87.5%	165	4.9%	166	4.9%	7	0.2%	87	2.6%	2,798	82.6%	3,389
West Feliciana	2,800	65.5%	430	10.1%	834	19.5%	51	1.2%	162	3.8%	1,966	46.0%	4,277
Winn	3,153	78.9%	397	9.9%	260	6.5%	24	0.6%	164	4.1%	2,756	69.0%	3,998
TOTALS	851,568	61.6%	246,933	17.9%	182,887	13.2%	31,568	2.3%	70,334	5.1%	604,635	43.7%	1,383,290

== See also ==
- 2022 Louisiana elections
