= Louisiana's 102nd House of Representatives district =

American legislative district

Louisiana's 102nd State House of Representatives district
Representative
| Delisha Boyd; D–New Orleans |

Louisiana's 102nd House of Representatives district is one of 105 Louisiana House of Representatives districts. It is currently held by Democrat Delisha Boyd.

== Geography ==
HD102 is located entirely within the city of New Orleans.

== Election results ==
| Year | Winning candidate | Party | Percent | Opponent | Party | Percent | Opponent | Party | Percent | Opponent | Party | Percent | Opponent | Party | Percent | Opponent | Party | Percent |
|---|---|---|---|---|---|---|---|---|---|---|---|---|---|---|---|---|---|---|
| 2011 | Jeffery Arnold | Democratic | 81.2% | Carlos Williams | Democratic | 18.8% | | | | | | | | | | | | |
| 2015 | Gary Carter Jr | Democratic | 56.5% | Lourdes Moran | Democratic | 16.2% | Skip Gallagher | Democratic | 16.1% | Kenneth Garrett | Democratic | 5.9% | Kenneth Cutno | Democratic | 4.1% | Anthony Ibert | Democratic | 1.1% |
| 2019 | Gary Carter Jr | Democratic | Cancelled | | | | | | | | | | | | | | | |
| 2021 (special) | Delisha Boyd | Democratic | 61.7% | Jordan Bridges | Democratic | 38.3% | | | | | | | | | | | | |
| 2023 | Delisha Boyd | Democratic | Cancelled | | | | | | | | | | | | | | | |
