= Gary Chambers =

American activist and politician (born 1985)

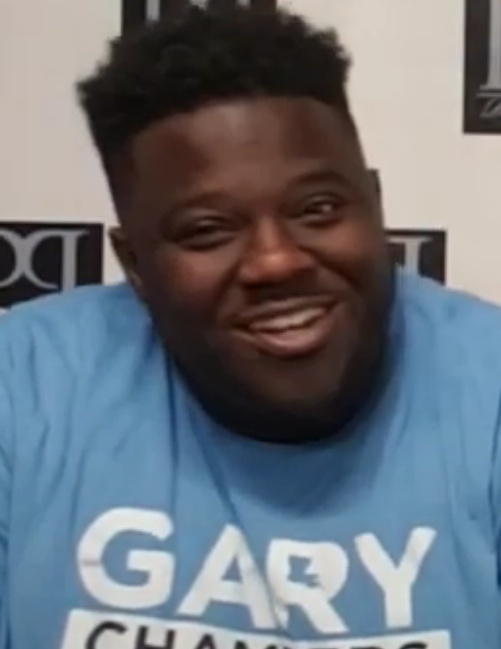

Personal details
- Born: August 5, 1985 (age 41) Baton Rouge, Louisiana, U.S.
- Party: Democratic
- Children: 1

Gary Chambers Jr. (born August 5, 1985) is an American civil rights activist and perennial candidate from Baton Rouge, Louisiana. A progressive member of the Democratic Party, Chambers ran unsuccessfully in the 2022 United States Senate election in Louisiana, the 2021 Louisiana's 2nd congressional district special election, and, in 2019, for Louisiana's 15th State Senate district. In 2020, a video of Chambers' public testimony at a school board meeting debating the renaming of a high school named after Confederate general Robert E. Lee received millions of views online.

== Early life and education ==
Chambers was born and raised in northern Baton Rouge, Louisiana in a middle-class, predominantly Black neighborhood. Chambers's mother, Sharon, died by suicide when he was two months old. He was raised by his aunt and uncle, Ivon Johnson, a public school teacher, and William Johnson, a janitor, whom he calls "mom" and "dad." At age 13, Chambers's biological father regained his sobriety and Chambers moved to Jacksonville, Florida, later returning to Baton Rouge and graduating from Glen Oaks High School.

== Career ==
After high school, Chambers lived with his cousins in New Orleans, where he worked as a manager to reopen a Home Depot location in New Orleans East following Hurricane Katrina. He later returned again to Baton Rouge to manage a car dealership. Chambers is also an ordained minister.

In 2012, Chambers launched The Rouge Collection, a publication focusing on the Black community in northern Baton Rouge.

By 2016, Chambers had become an outspoken civil rights advocate in north Baton Rouge. He led protests against the killing of Alton Sterling, and served as a spokesperson for the Sterling family and master of ceremonies at Sterling's funeral.

In 2019, Chambers ran unsuccessfully against State Senator Regina Barrow for Louisiana's 15th State Senate district, winning 26% of the vote.

In 2020, Chambers led street protests following the murder of George Floyd.

=== 2020 school board meeting ===
In June 2020, Chambers, who has a daughter who attends public schools in Baton Rouge, attended a meeting of the East Baton Rouge Parish School Board, which was debating whether to rename Lee High School, named for Confederate general Robert E. Lee. Chambers and others had unsuccessfully attempted to convince the school board to change the name of the school since 2016. During the public comments portion of the 2020 school board meeting, Chambers displayed a photograph showing a member of the school board shopping online during the meeting, and said this showed that the school board member did not care about racial justice. A video clip of Chambers' public testimony at the school board meeting received millions of views online. The school is now named Liberty Magnet High School. After the school board meeting, Chambers called for the removal of other Confederacy symbols in Louisiana, such as the statue of Confederate general Francis T. Nicholls at Nicholls State University.

In November 2020, Chambers preserved and circulated a deleted social media post by GoAuto founder and CEO Greg Tramontin in which Tramontin referred to Kamala Harris as a "hoe". Tramontin apologized, and Chambers called on Tramontin to resign.

=== 2021 special election campaign ===
Chambers ran unsuccessfully as a Democrat for U.S. Representative to represent Louisiana's 2nd congressional district in 2021. He was encouraged to run by Shaun King and other national progressive leaders. Chambers's progressive platform included paying for Medicare for All by reducing defense spending. He supported the Green New Deal, the Infrastructure Investment and Jobs Act, the Build Back Better Plan, a $15 federal minimum wage, and a moratorium on drilling in U.S. waters in the Gulf of Mexico. At a campaign debate, Chambers said he believed Donald Trump incited the January 6 United States Capitol attack and that had Chambers been in Congress at the time, he would have voted to impeach Trump.

During the campaign, Chambers was labeled a "firebrand" and "provacateur". Some of his old social media postings were recirculated, including a 2011 tweet using the word "homo", and a 2015 tweet referring to "white hoes."

Chambers's campaign raised $400,000, almost as much as his opponents, and he had a larger social media presence, with hundreds of thousands of online followers. At the March 20, 2021, primary election, Chambers beat expectations, largely by capturing a larger-than-expected share of white votes. He won 21% of the vote, narrowly missing a runoff by 1,550 votes.

Chambers endorsed second-place finisher Karen Carter Peterson in the April 24 runoff election. However, Peterson was unable to draw enough support from white liberals in New Orleans who voted for Chambers and lost the runoff to Troy Carter.

In September 2021, Bigger Than Me, a nonprofit organization founded by Chambers that supports progressive candidates in the Southern United States, distributed generators and gasoline donated by Jrue Holiday to people in southeast Louisiana following Hurricane Ida.

=== 2022 U.S. Senate campaign ===
On January 12, 2022, at age 36, Chambers announced his candidacy as a Democrat to run for the United States Senate. Most analysts doubted that Chambers had any realistic prospects of winning the general election.

On January 18, 2022, Chambers released his first advertisement of the campaign, showing him smoking marijuana in an open field while criticizing marijuana prohibition. Chambers was the first US Senate candidate in history to openly smoke marijuana in a political advertisement. In the 37-second advertisement, Chambers cites ACLU statistics showing that someone is arrested in the United States for marijuana possession every 37 seconds on average, that US states spend $3.7 billion per year enforcing marijuana laws, and that Black Americans are four times more likely than white Americans to be arrested for marijuana possession. The ad, written and produced by New Orleans resident Erick Sanchez, founder of United Public Affairs, and directed and edited by Baton Rouge filmmaker Erwin Marionneaux, received millions of views on the internet within days. It was a direct appeal to Chambers's progressive base and sought to destigmatize marijuana use. Chambers has supported expunging criminal records of individuals convicted under marijuana laws.

Nonetheless, Chambers' socially progressive platform failed to appeal to Louisiana's conservative electorate. Incumbent Republican John Kennedy won an overwhelming 61.6% of the vote in the state's nonpartisan jungle primary, while Chambers won just 17.9% and fellow Democrat Luke Mixon took 13.2%. Kennedy's vote share was the highest for a Republican Senate candidate in Louisiana history.

== See also ==
- List of African-American United States Senate candidates
