= Senator Heitmeier =

Senator Heitmeier may refer to:

- David Heitmeier (born 1961), Louisiana State Senate
- Francis C. Heitmeier (born 1950), Louisiana State Senate
