= Louisiana's 7th State Senate district =

American legislative district

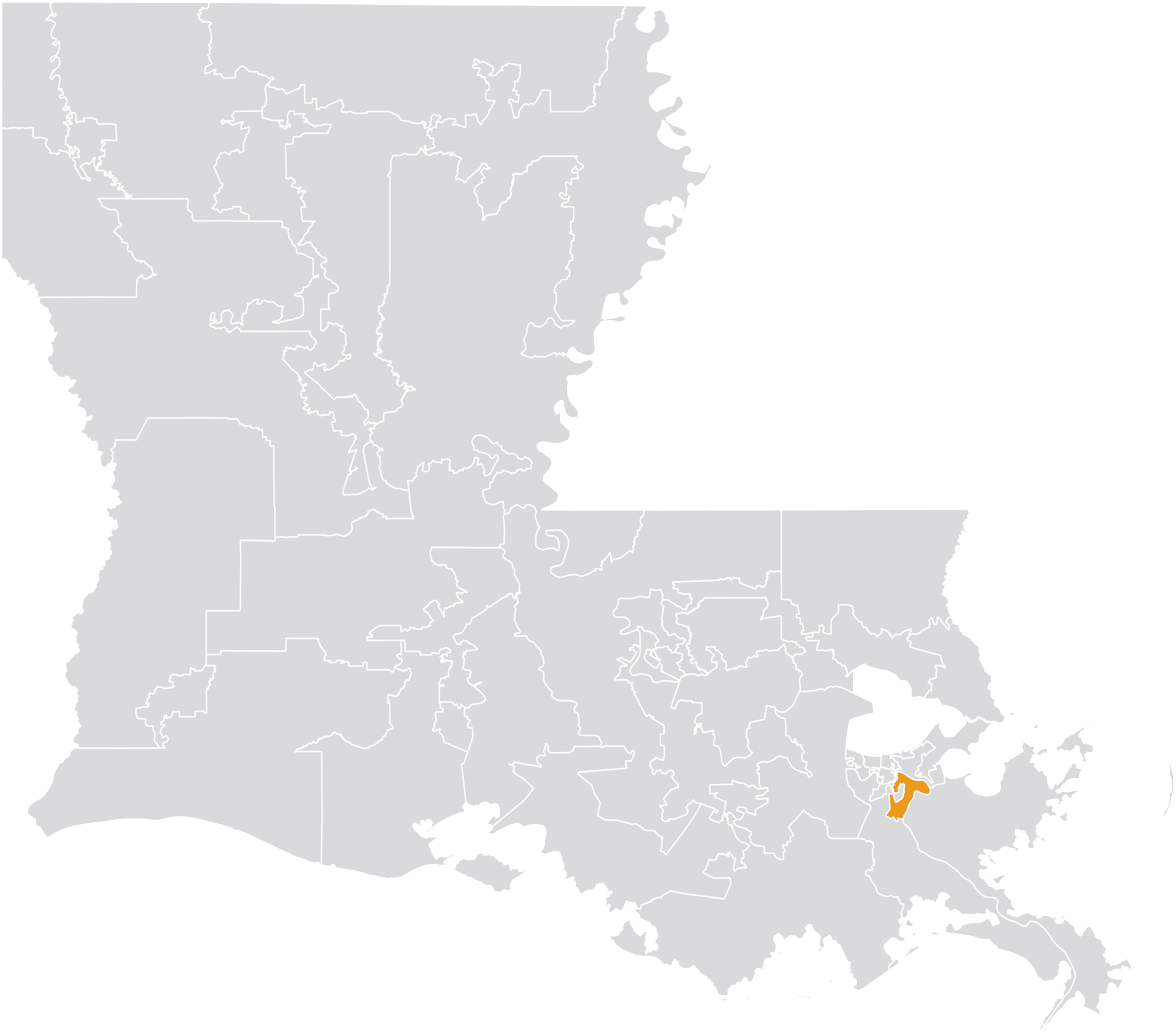
Senator
Gary Carter Jr. D–New Orleans
- Registration: 57.1% Democratic; 15.9% Republican; 27.0% No party preference
- Demographics: 29% White; 56% Black; 11% Hispanic; 3% Asian; 1% Other
- Population (2019): 117,229
- Registered voters: 65,977

Louisiana's 7th State Senate district is one of 39 districts in the Louisiana State Senate. It has been represented by Democrat Gary Carter Jr. since 2021.

== Geography ==
District 7 covers much of southern New Orleans and parts of Jefferson and Plaquemines Parishes, including all of Algiers and parts of Gretna, Terrytown, and Belle Chasse.

The district overlaps with Louisiana's 1st and 2nd congressional districts, and with the 85th, 87th, 102nd, and 105th districts of the Louisiana House of Representatives.

== Recent election results ==
Louisiana uses a jungle primary system. If no candidate receives 50% in the first round of voting, when all candidates appear on the same ballot regardless of party, the top-two finishers advance to a runoff election.

=== 2021 special ===
2021 Louisiana State Senate special election, District 7
Party	Candidate	Votes	%
Democratic	Gary Carter Jr.	4,137	60.2
Republican	Patricia McCarty	1,181	17.2
Democratic	Joanna Cappiello-Leopold	948	13.8
Democratic	Mack Cormier	601	8.8
Total votes		6,867	100

=== 2019 ===
2019 Louisiana State Senate election, District 7
Party	Candidate	Votes	%
Democratic	Troy Carter (incumbent)	Unopposed	100
Total votes		Unopposed	100
Democratic hold			

=== 2015 ===
2015 Louisiana State Senate election, District 7
Primary election
Party	Candidate	Votes	%
Democratic	Troy Carter	7,700	37.4
Democratic	Jeff Arnold	6,858	33.3
Democratic	Leslie Ellison	3,097	15.0
Democratic	Roy Glapion	2,957	14.3
Total votes		20,612	100
General election
Democratic	Troy Carter	12,935	56.8
Democratic	Jeff Arnold	9,852	43.2
Total votes		22,787	100
Democratic hold			

=== 2011 ===
2011 Louisiana State Senate election, District 7
Party	Candidate	Votes	%
Democratic	David Heitmeier (incumbent)	Unopposed	100
Total votes		Unopposed	100
Democratic hold			

=== Federal and statewide results ===
Year	Office	Results
2020	President	Biden 70.1–28.2%
2019	Governor (runoff)	Edwards 78.9–21.1%
2016	President	Clinton 66.7–30.0%
2015	Governor (runoff)	Edwards 74.0–26.0%
2014	Senate (runoff)	Landrieu 71.6–28.4%
2012	President	Obama 66.6–32.0%
