= Delisha =

Delisha is a feminine African-American given name. Notable people with the name include:

- Delisha Boyd (born 1969), American politician
- DeLisha Milton-Jones (born 1974), American retired basketball player
- Delisha Thomas, Trinidadian singer-songwriter
