= 2021 Louisiana's 2nd congressional district special election =

Louisiana's 2nd congressional district special election
- March 20, 2021 (first round); April 24, 2021 (runoff)

Louisiana's 2nd congressional district
- Turnout: 18.0% (first round); 16.8% (second round)
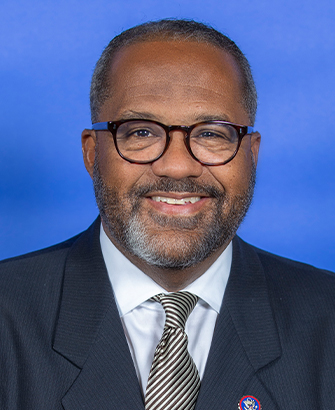

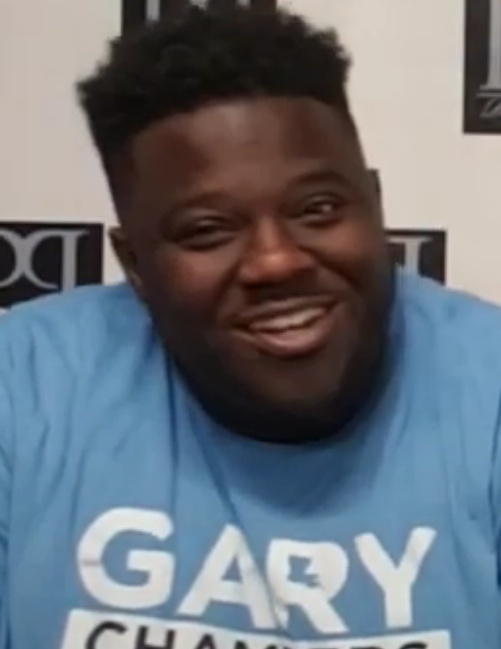

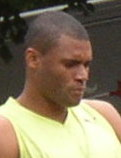
Nominee	Troy Carter	Karen Carter Peterson
Party	Democratic	Democratic
First round	34,402; 36.38%	21,673; 22.92%
Runoff	48,513; 55.25%	39,297; 44.75%
Nominee	Gary Chambers	Claston Bernard
Party	Democratic	Republican
First round	20,163; 21.31%	9,237; 9.77%
Runoff	Eliminated	Eliminated
- Carter: 30–40% 40–50% 50–60% 60–70% 70–80% Peterson: 20–30% 30–40% 50–60% 60–70% Chambers: 20–30% Bernard: 30–40%
U.S. Representative before election
Vacant
Elected U.S. Representative
Troy Carter
Democratic

The 2021 Louisiana's 2nd congressional district special election was held on March 20, 2021, with a runoff being held on April 24, 2021.

On November 17, 2020, incumbent Democratic representative Cedric Richmond announced that he would resign from the United States House of Representatives to serve as the director of the Office of Public Liaison and as a Senior Advisor to Joe Biden. He did so on January 15, 2021, and took his new job when Biden assumed office on January 20, 2021. When congressional seats in Louisiana become vacant, the governor has the ability to call a special election at any time. The special election to fill Louisiana's 2nd congressional district took place on March 20, and a runoff was held on April 24. Troy Carter won the runoff election on April 24, 2021, against fellow Democrat Karen Peterson.

== Primary candidates ==
=== Democratic Party ===
Of the Democratic candidates, Troy Carter, a state senator, Karen Carter Peterson, a state senator and former chair of the Louisiana Democratic Party, and Gary Chambers, an activist, were considered the frontrunners. Of these candidates, Carter was considered to be moderate, while Peterson and Chambers were considered to be progressives. In the jungle primary, Carter and Peterson took first and second place with 36% and 23% of the vote, while Chambers took third place with 21%. Chambers' result was considered an overperformance, as he significantly outdid his polling numbers. On March 29, Chambers endorsed Peterson.

==== Declared ====
- Troy Carter, state senator and candidate for this seat in 2006
- Gary Chambers Jr., activist and candidate for Louisiana State Senate district 15 in 2019
- Harold John, postal worker
- J. Christopher Johnson, activist
- Lloyd M. Kelly
- Desiree Ontiveros, small business owner
- Karen Carter Peterson, state senator, former chair of the Louisiana Democratic Party, and runoff-advanced candidate for this seat in 2006
- Jenette M. Porter, small business owner

=== Republican Party ===
==== Declared ====
- Chelsea Ardoin, HR professional
- Claston Bernard, decathlete
- Greg Lirette, information technology professional
- Sheldon C. Vincent Sr., retired postal worker

=== Libertarian Party ===
==== Declared ====
- Mindy McConnell, principal

=== No party affiliation ===
==== Declared ====
- Belden "Noonie Man" Batiste, activist and perennial candidate
- Brandon Jolicoeur, actor

=== Endorsements ===
Claston Bernard (R)

U.S. representatives

- Joseph Cao, former U.S. representative for Louisiana's 2nd congressional district
- Burgess Owens, U.S. representative for Utah's 4th congressional district

State legislators

- Kathy Edmonston, state representative
- Elbert Guillory, former state senator
- Vernon Jones, former Georgia state representative

Individuals

- Rev. Jesse Lee Peterson, podcast and talk show host, president of the Brotherhood Organization of a New Destiny (BOND)(1990–present)

Organizations

- Louisiana Republican Party
Troy Carter (D)

Executive branch officials

- Cedric Richmond, Senior Advisor to the President of the United States and former U.S. representative for Louisiana's 2nd congressional district

U.S. representatives

- Jim Clyburn, U.S. representative for South Carolina's 6th congressional district

State legislators

- John Alario, former president of the Louisiana State Senate and former Speaker of the Louisiana House of Representatives (Republican)
- Don Cravins Jr., former state senator and representative
- Mike Fesi, state senator (Republican)
- Cleo Fields, state senator and former U.S. representative for Louisiana's 4th congressional district
- Francis C. Heitmeier, former state senator

Local officials

- Sharon Weston Broome, mayor-president of East Baton Rouge Parish and former Louisiana state senator

Newspapers

- Gambit
- The Louisiana Weekly
- The Times-Picayune/The New Orleans Advocate

Organizations

- AFL–CIO
- Forum for Equality
Gary Chambers (D)

Individuals

- John Iadarola, talk show host, YouTube personality, and political pundit
- Shaun King, author and civil rights activist
- Sam Seder, actor, political commentator, and host of The Majority Report with Sam Seder
- Cenk Uygur, journalist, creator of The Young Turks, and co-founder of Justice Democrats
- Marianne Williamson, author, activist, and candidate for president of the United States in 2020
Karen Carter Peterson (D)

U.S. representatives

- Katie Porter, U.S. representative for California's 45th congressional district

State legislators

- Stacey Abrams, founder of Fair Fight Action, former Minority Leader of the Georgia House of Representatives, and nominee for governor of Georgia in 2018

Local officials

- LaToya Cantrell, mayor of New Orleans

Organizations

- Congressional Progressive Caucus PAC
- Democracy for America
- EMILY's List
- League of Conservation Voters Action Fund
- Our Revolution
- Progressive Change Campaign Committee
- Sierra Club

== Jungle primary ==
=== Polling ===
==== Graphical summary ====
Poll source	Date(s) administered	Sample size (Note: Key: A – all adults RV – registered voters LV – likely voters V – unclear)	Margin of error	Troy Carter (D)	Karen Carter Peterson (D)	Gary Chambers Jr. (D)	Desiree Ontiveros (D)	Other	Undecided
Edgewater Research/My People Vote	March 2–7, 2021	651 (LV)	± 3.8%	35%	24%	11%	–	16%	15%
LexthomResearch and Development, LLC	February 26 – March 3, 2021	1,067 (LV)	± 3.0%	23%	17%	13%	4%	3% (Note: Claston Bernard (R) with 3%)	40%
Trust the People PAC (D) (Note: This poll was sponsored by Trust the People PAC, an anti-Troy Carter super PAC.)	February 21–22, 2021	620 (LV)	± 4.0%	24%	23%	6%	2%	16% (Note: "Republican candidates" with 11% and "Another candidate" with 5%)	29%
Silas Lee & Associates (D) (Note: This poll was sponsored by Troy Carter's campaign.)	February 12–14, 2021	450 (LV)	± 3.5%	28%	19%	6%	2%	8% (Note: Chelsea Ardoin (R), Belden Batiste (I), Harold John (D), J. Christopher Johnson (D), Brandon Jolicoeur (NPP), Jenette Porter (D), Lloyd Kelly (D), Greg Lirette (R), Mindy McConnell (L) and Sheldon Vincent (R) combined with 6%; Claston Bernard (R) with 2%)	38%

Hypothetical polling

Poll source	Date(s) administered	Sample size	Margin of error	Troy Carter (D)	Cleo Fields (D)	Mitch Landrieu (D)	Helena Moreno (D)	Karen Carter Peterson (D)	Other	Undecided
ALG Research (D)	November 2–5, 2020	500 (LV)	± 4.4%	15%	14%	25%	18%	4%	3%	22%
ALG Research (D)	November 2–5, 2020	500 (LV)	± 4.4%	22%	17%	–	24%	7%	4%	22%

=== Predictions ===
Source	Ranking	As of
The Cook Political Report	Solid D	March 19, 2021
Inside Elections	Solid D	March 19, 2021
Sabato's Crystal Ball	Safe D	March 18, 2021

=== Results ===
2021 Louisiana's 2nd congressional district special election
Party	Candidate	Votes	%
Democratic	Troy Carter	34,402	36.38
Democratic	Karen Carter Peterson	21,673	22.92
Democratic	Gary Chambers Jr.	20,163	21.31
Republican	Claston Bernard	9,237	9.77
Republican	Chelsea Ardoin	3,218	3.40
Republican	Greg Lirette	2,349	2.48
Republican	Sheldon C. Vincent Sr.	754	0.80
Democratic	Desiree Ontiveros	699	0.74
Independent	Belden Batiste	598	0.63
Democratic	Harold John	403	0.43
Libertarian	Mindy McConnell	323	0.34
Democratic	J. Christopher Johnson	288	0.30
Democratic	Jenette M. Porter	244	0.26
Democratic	Lloyd M. Kelly	122	0.13
Independent	Brandon Jolicoeur	94	0.10
Total votes		94,567	100.00

==== By parish ====
Parish	Troy Carter Democratic		Karen Carter Peterson Democratic		Gary Chambers Jr. Democratic		Claston Bernard Republican		Various candidates Other parties		Margin		Total votes
Parish	#	%	#	%	#	%	#	%	#	%	#	%	Total votes
Ascension	776	33.9	653	28.5	307	13.4	392	17.1	162	7.1	123	5.4%	2,290
Assumption	373	44.9	152	18.3	59	7.1	149	17.9	98	11.8	221	26.6%	831
East Baton Rouge	2,273	26.2	3,045	35.1	2,832	32.6	164	1.9	365	4.2	213	2.5%	8,679
West Baton Rouge	289	20.4	334	23.6	296	20.9	318	22.5	177	12.5	16	1.1%	1,414
Iberville	622	23.9	504	19.3	640	24.6	583	22.4	258	9.9	18	0.7%	2,607
Jefferson	7,702	39.5	3,283	16.8	1,989	10.2	2,902	14.9	3,647	18.7	4,419	22.6%	19,523
Orleans	18,366	38.6	12,055	25.3	12,897	27.1	1,798	3.8	2,514	5.3	5,469	11.5%	47,630
St. Charles	1,037	23.2	476	10.6	334	7.5	1,495	33.4	1,133	25.3	458	10.2%	4,475
St. James	1,238	35.0	553	15.6	317	9.0	990	28.0	437	12.4	248	7.0%	3,535
St. John the Baptist	1,726	48.2	618	17.3	492	13.7	446	12.5	301	8.4	1,108	30.9%	3,583
Total	34,402	36.38	21,673	22.92	20,163	21.32	9,237	9.77	9,092	9.61	12,729	13.46%	94,567

== Runoff ==
A runoff was held on April 24 between Troy Carter and Karen Carter Peterson. In the April 24th runoff, Carter beat Peterson 48,513, 55.2%, to 39,297, 44.8%, with 87,810 votes reported from 100% of precincts.

=== Predictions ===
Source	Ranking	As of
The Cook Political Report	Solid D	March 19, 2021
Inside Elections	Solid D	April 23, 2021
Sabato's Crystal Ball	Safe D	April 15, 2021

=== Endorsements ===
Troy Carter (D)

Executive branch officials

- Cedric Richmond, Senior Advisor to the President of the United States and former U.S. representative for LA-2 (2011–2021)

U.S. representatives

- Joyce Beatty, U.S. representative for OH-3 (2013–present); Chair of the Congressional Black Caucus (2021–present)
- Jim Clyburn, U.S. representative for SC-6. (1993–present)
- Hakeem Jeffries, U.S. representative for NY-8 (2013–present)
- Ro Khanna, U.S. representative for California's 17th congressional district (2017–present)
- Bennie Thompson, U.S. representative for Mississippi's 2nd congressional district (1993–present)

State legislators

- John Alario, former president of the Louisiana State Senate and former Speaker of the Louisiana House of Representatives (Republican)
- Don Cravins Jr., former state senator and representative
- Mike Fesi, state senator (Republican)
- Cleo Fields, state senator for Baton Rouge (14th district) and former U.S. representative for Louisiana's 4th congressional district
- Francis C. Heitmeier, former state senator

Local officials

- Sharon Weston Broome, mayor-president of East Baton Rouge Parish and former Louisiana state senator
- LaMont Cole, president of Baton Rouge Metropolitan Council
- Helena Moreno, president of the New Orleans City Council and former Louisiana state representative
- Cynthia Lee Sheng, parish president of Jefferson Parish (Republican)
- Jason Williams, district attorney of New Orleans

Newspapers

- Gambit
- The Louisiana Weekly
- The Times-Picayune/The New Orleans Advocate

Organizations

- AFL–CIO
- Forum for Equality PAC
Karen Carter Peterson (D)

Governors

- Howard Dean, former governor of Vermont (1991–2003) and former chair of the Democratic National Committee (2005–2009)

U.S. representatives

- Mondaire Jones, U.S. representative from NY-17 (2021–present)
- Carolyn Maloney, U.S. representative for New York's 12th congressional district (1993–present)
- Alexandria Ocasio-Cortez, U.S. representative for New York's 14th congressional district (2019–present)
- Katie Porter, U.S. representative for California's 45th congressional district (2019–present)

State legislators

- Stacey Abrams, founder of Fair Fight Action, former Minority Leader of the Georgia House of Representatives, and nominee for governor of Georgia in 2018

Local officials

- LaToya Cantrell, mayor of New Orleans and former member of the New Orleans City Council

Organizations

- Congressional Progressive Caucus PAC
- Democracy for America
- EMILY's List
- End Citizens United
- League of Conservation Voters Action Fund
- Let America Vote
- Our Revolution
- Peace Action
- Progressive Change Campaign Committee
- Sierra Club

=== Results ===
2021 Louisiana's 2nd congressional district special election runoff
Party	Candidate	Votes	%
Democratic	Troy Carter	48,513	55.25%
Democratic	Karen Carter Peterson	39,297	44.75%
Total votes		87,810	100.00
Democratic hold			

==== By parish ====
Parish	Troy Carter Democratic		Karen Carter Peterson Democratic		Margin		Total votes
Parish	#	%	#	%	#	%	Total votes
Ascension	1,113	47.5	1,228	52.5	115	5.0%	2,341
Assumption	441	62.6	263	37.4	178	25.2%	704
East Baton Rouge	3,032	35.4	5,542	64.6	2,510	29.2%	8,574
West Baton Rouge	617	48.6	652	51.4	35	2.8%	1,269
Iberville	1,173	48.0	1,272	52.0	99	4.0%	2,445
Jefferson	11,195	67.0	5,524	33.0	5,671	34.0%	16,719
Orleans	24,160	53.0	21,467	47.0	2,693	6.0%	45,627
St. Charles	2,346	70.3	989	29.7	1,357	40.6%	3,335
St. James	2,356	66.2	1,202	33.8	1,357	32.4%	3,558
St. John the Baptist	2,078	64.3	1,156	35.7	922	28.6%	3,234
Totals	48,513	55.25	39,297	44.75	9,216	10.50%	87,810

== Notes ==
Additional candidates and polling key

Partisan clients
