= Gary Carter Jr. =

American politician (born 1974)

Gary Michael Carter Jr.

Member of the Louisiana State Senate from the 7th district
- Incumbent
- Assumed office July 2, 2021
- Preceded by: Troy Carter

Member of the Louisiana House of Representatives from the 102nd district
- In office January 11, 2016 – July 2, 2021
- Preceded by: Jeff Arnold
- Succeeded by: Delisha Boyd

Personal details
- Born: November 1974 (age 51) New Orleans, Louisiana, U.S.
- Party: Democratic
- Relations: Troy Carter (uncle)
- Children: 3
- Education: Xavier University of New Orleans (BA); Tulane University (JD)

Gary Michael Carter Jr. (born November 1974) is an American attorney and politician serving as the Democratic member of the Louisiana Senate for the 7th district. He previously served in the Louisiana House of Representatives representing the 102nd district, which encompasses the Algiers neighborhood.

== Early life and education ==
Carter was born in New Orleans. A graduate of Archbishop Shaw High School and Xavier University, Carter earned his J.D. degree from Tulane University Law School, all in New Orleans.

== Career ==
Carter is a partner at the firm, Kelly Hart & Pitre.

On January 11, 2016, he succeeded fellow Democrat Jeff Arnold in the Louisiana House of Representatives. Arnold was ineligible to seek a fourth four-year term in the legislative primary held on October 24, 2015.

In the primary, Carter polled 4,914 votes (57 percent) of the ballots cast against five fellow Democrats.

Carter said that as a state representative, he would emphasize an economic plan to establish more jobs and invest in education to "break the long-term cycle of crime in our city."

In June 2021, Carter was elected to the Louisiana Senate in a special election to succeed his uncle Troy Carter, who had been elected to the U.S. House of Representatives.

In 2023, Gary Carter Jr. was re-elected to his position as a member of the Louisiana State Senate, representing District 7. He ran unopposed, securing another term in office.

== Personal life ==
He is Catholic. His uncle is U.S. Rep. Troy Carter.

Louisiana House of Representatives
Preceded by Jeff Arnold	Louisiana State Representative for District 102 (Algiers section of New Orleans); 2016–2021	Succeeded by Delisha Boyd
