= Honor Flight =

Non-profit organization

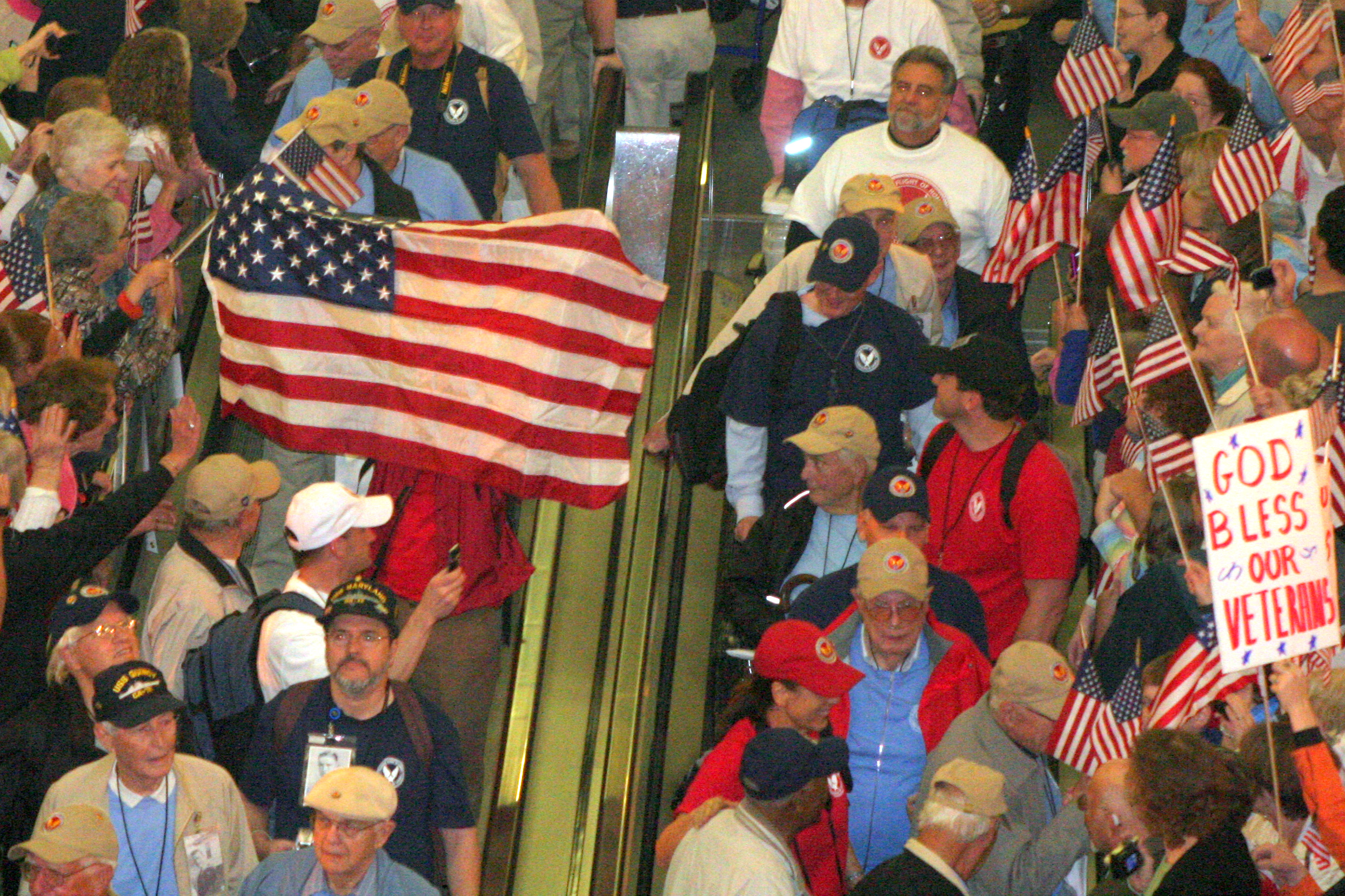
Flight of Honor participants in Raleigh, North Carolina are welcomed back by crowds, May 2011.

An Honor Flight is conducted by non-profit organizations dedicated to transporting as many United States military veterans as possible to see the memorials of the respective war(s) they fought in Washington, DC, at no cost to the veterans. These organizations are focused on bringing veterans of World War II to the National World War II Memorial, and any veteran with a terminal illness, to see the memorial of the war they fought in. Organizers plan to "naturally transition" their programs to focus on veterans of the Korean War, the Vietnam War, and subsequent wars as the veterans of those wars get older.

Honor flights arrive at all three of the Washington's area airports: Ronald Reagan Washington National Airport, Baltimore/Washington International Thurgood Marshall Airport, and Washington Dulles International Airport. The veterans are generally escorted by volunteer guardians, who help them on the flight and around DC. After landing, the taxiing airplane may be saluted by fire trucks, and passengers are often met by cheering crowds in DC or upon their return flight home.

== Honor Flight Network ==
The Honor Flight Network is a 501(c)(3) non-profit organization which works as an umbrella organization with local chapters and various subgroups.

The Honor Flight Network reports that it has flown over 244,000 veterans to the Washington, D.C. memorials since 2005.

=== History ===
The network was cofounded by Earl Morse, a physician assistant and retired Air Force captain, and Jeff Miller, a small business owner and son of a WWII veteran. Morse worked in a Department of Veterans Affairs clinic in Springfield, Ohio, where he saw many patients who were World War II veterans. After the National World War II Memorial in Washington was completed in 2004, he asked many of his veteran patients if they were going to see it, and most said yes. "I would see my World War II veterans some three, six months later," Morse said, "and I'd ask them if they'd gone to see it. Three hundred of them, and not one of them had been to it. Reality set in. They were never going." Morse offered to fly with two veterans to Washington to see the memorial, and after seeing them break down and cry and graciously accept the offer, he pitched his idea to a local aeroclub of 300 private pilots at a local Air Force base, proposing that the pilots would pay for the flights for the veterans to Washington and personally escort them around the city. Eleven volunteered, and the network was formed; by 2005, a board was formed, funds were raised, and volunteers had joined.

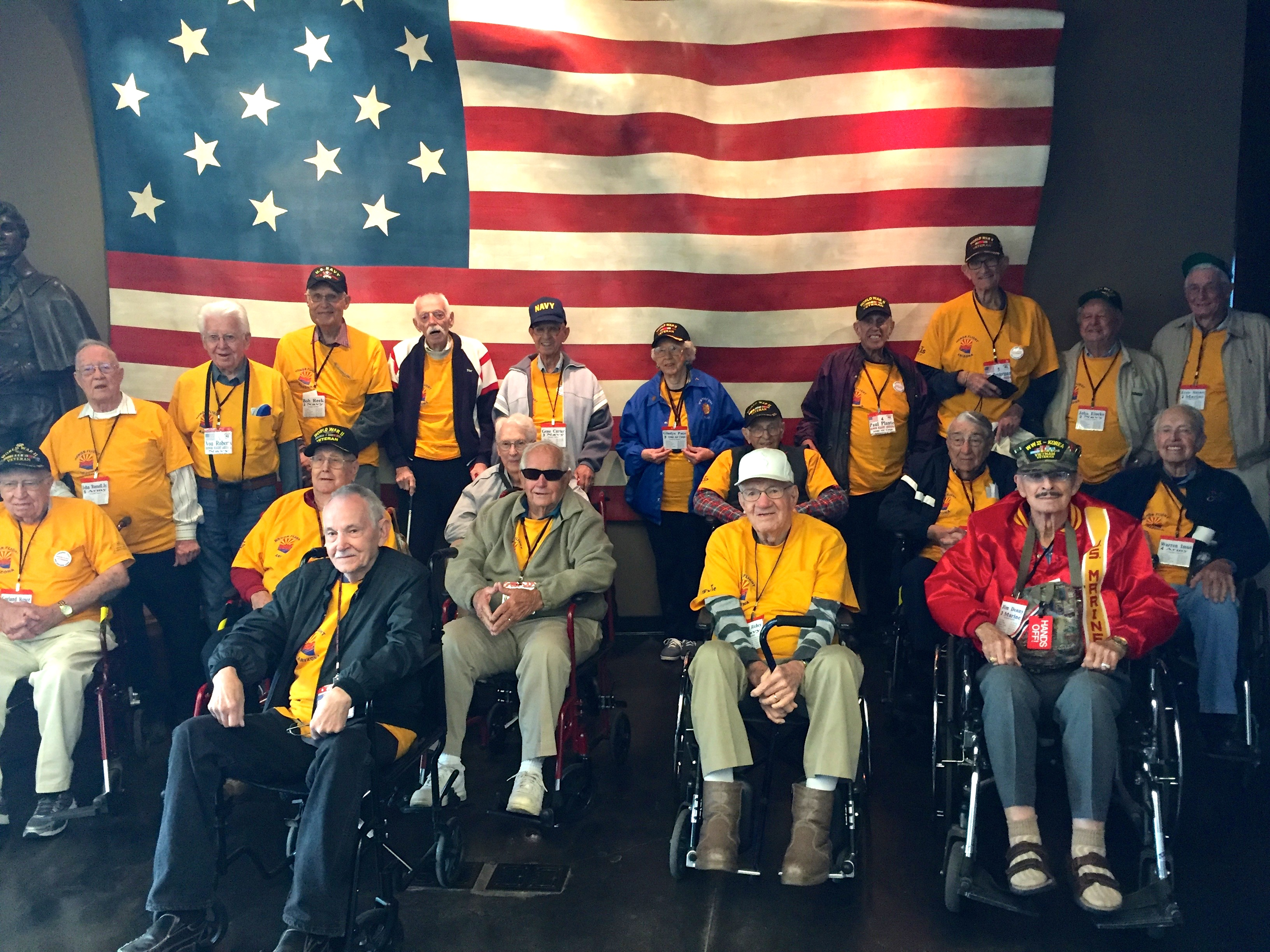
Ft. McHenry WWII Honor Flight, April 2016

The first honor flight took place in May 2005, when six small planes flew 12 veterans to Washington, DC. Due to high participation, the program began using commercial flights. At the end of 2005, the program had transported 137 veterans to the memorial. In late 2005, Jeff Miller, a dry cleaning company owner in Hendersonville, North Carolina, inspired by Morse's vision, had a similar idea but on a larger scale. Miller, the son of a World War II veteran and nephew of a B-24 bomber pilot who died in the war, had been a charter member of the National World War II Memorial Foundation. Like Morse, Miller lamented that many World War II veterans would be unable to visit the memorial. The seed that Morse had planted grew to a veritable forest of volunteerism, fundraising and goodwill toward the Greatest Generation veterans, who had been too busy building their communities to demand recognition for wartime service. On September 23 and 24 and November 4, 2006, HonorAir flew more than 300 World War II veterans from the Asheville Regional Airport to Washington D.C., free of charge. HonorAir provided everything: a medical doctor and several EMTs, guardians who would attend to the needs of three to four veterans each, tour buses to take them the World War II Memorial and other national memorials, and a box lunch. Ticket agents and passengers lined the ropes as veterans emerged from the charter jets into the terminal. CBS Sunday Morning aired a moving feature about the HonorAir effort in September 2006. Bill Geist updated the story in 2007 because it was a story that was so important to him.

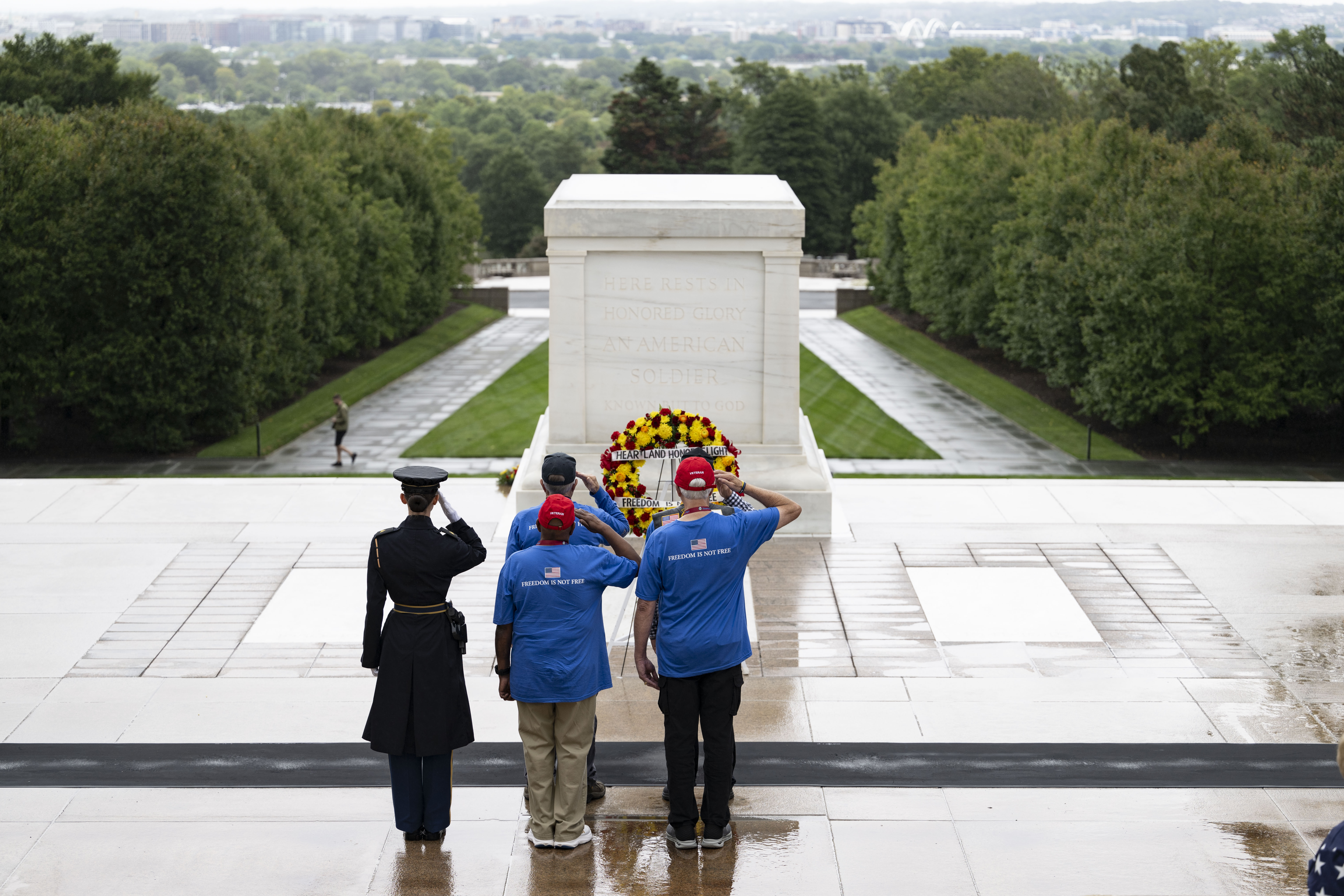
Veterans with the Heartland Honor Flight visit Arlington National Cemetery, September 2024

The Springfield group and HonorAir soon merged to form the Honor Flight Network which was headquartered in Springfield, Ohio. Both Jeff Miller and Earl Morse were awarded the Presidential Citizens Medal in 2008 for their extensive work with bringing the program together. In 2019 Honor Flight national headquarters moved to Arlington Virginia.

Many veterans, both men and women, have been honored with flights to Washington D.C.. In 2015 the first all-female Honor Flight was held, with 140 female veterans.

On May 21, 2021, Honor Flight celebrated their 16th Anniversary of their first Honor Flight trip. Since that first flight in 2005, Honor Flight has transported over 244,000 veterans to Washington, D.C. to visit their memorials.

=== Logistics ===
Flights arrive in any of Washington's three area airports: Ronald Reagan Washington National Airport, Baltimore/Washington International Thurgood Marshall Airport, and Washington Dulles International Airport. Southwest Airlines is the official commercial airline of the Honor Flight Network, although the network utilizes many national airlines. The veterans on the Honor Flights are escorted by volunteer guardians, who help them on the flight and around the D.C. area. An Honor Flight of 100 people, including veterans and volunteers can cost between $30,000 to $175,000 depending on what area of the country the flight originates from. Costs are covered by donations with assistance from the airline.

By 2012, the group had expanded to include 114 chapters; in 2021, the movement had grown to 133 chapters serving veterans in 45 states and the District of Columbia. As of March 2020 Honor Flight has flown more than 244,897 veterans to Washington, D.C.

=== Heroes' Welcome ===
Heroes' Welcome is a sub-group of the Honor Flight Network which organizes welcoming ceremonies for the Honor Flights at the three Washington-area airports. Heroes' Welcome is a project of the American Legion Auxiliary Unit 180 in Vienna, Virginia. The ceremonies typically involve a group waiting inside or outside the gate where the flight arrives, clapping and cheering as they walk in. Active duty military members are often present, as are other volunteers such as school children.

== Triangle Flight of Honor ==
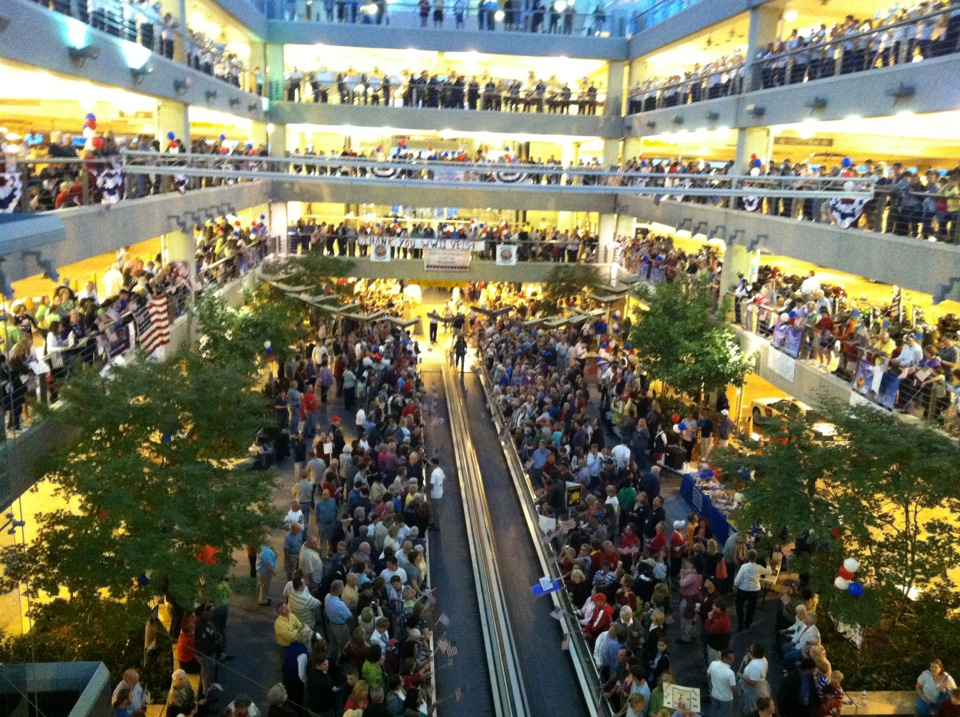
Thousands turn out at a Triangle Flight of Honor return celebration at the Raleigh-Durham International Airport in April 2012

A similar but independent organization organized flights for veterans in the area of North Carolina known as "The Triangle". The Triangle Flight of Honor has organized eight flights, each serving over 100 veterans. The trips originated from Raleigh Durham International Airport and concluded with a "Heros Welcome" return with marching bands, local celebrities, and attended by thousands of family members, friends, and area residents.

== Honor Flight film ==
The premiere of the 2012 documentary Honor Flight: One Last Mission at Miller Park in Milwaukee, Wisconsin, set a new Guinness World Record for the largest attendance at a film premiere: 28,442 people. The film, shown on a 5,940-square-foot (552 m^{2}) video board, depicts the lives of four World War II veterans who were part of the first Honor Flight from Milwaukee's Stars and Stripes Honor Flight Hub.

== Legislation ==
On 9 June 2014, Rep. Cedric Richmond (D-LA) introduced the "Honor Flight Act" in Congress. This bill would direct the Transportation Security Administration (TSA) to establish a process for providing expedited and dignified passenger screening services for veterans traveling on an Honor Flight to visit war memorials built and dedicated to honor their service. It became law on 16 December of the same year, after being passed in the House and the Senate without amendment.
