= Honor Flight Act =

- Long title: To amend title 49, United States Code, to require the Administrator of the Transportation Security Administration to establish a process for providing expedited and dignified passenger screening services for veterans traveling to visit war memorials built and dedicated to honor their service, and for other purposes.
- Announced in: the 113th United States Congress
- Sponsored by: Rep. Cedric L. Richmond (D, LA-2)
- Number of co-sponsors: 2

Codification
- U.S.C. sections affected: 49 U.S.C. § 44927, 49 U.S.C.
- Agencies affected: Transportation Security Administration

Legislative history
- Introduced in the House as H.R. 4812 by Rep. Cedric L. Richmond (D, LA-2) on June 9, 2014; Committee consideration by United States House Committee on Homeland Security, United States House Homeland Security Subcommittee on Transportation Security

The Honor Flight Act (H.R. 4812) is a bill that would direct the Transportation Security Administration (TSA) to establish a process for providing expedited and dignified passenger screening services for veterans traveling on an Honor Flight to visit war memorials built and dedicated to honor their service.

The bill was introduced into the United States House of Representatives during the 113th United States Congress.

== Background ==
An Honor Flight is conducted by non-profit organizations dedicated to transporting as many United States military veterans as possible to see the memorials of the respective war(s) they fought in Washington, D.C. at no cost to the veterans. Currently these organizations are focused on bringing veterans of World War II to the National World War II Memorial, and any veteran with a terminal illness to see the memorial of the war they fought in. Organizers plan to "naturally transition" their programs to focus on veterans of the Korean War, the Vietnam War, and subsequent wars as the veterans of those wars get older.

== Provisions of the bill ==
This summary is based largely on the summary provided by the Congressional Research Service, a public domain source.

The Honor Flight Act would direct the Administrator of the Transportation Security Administration (TSA) to establish a process for providing expedited and dignified passenger screening services for veterans traveling on an Honor Flight Network private charter, or another not-for-profit organization that honors veterans, to visit war memorials built and dedicated to honor their service.

== Congressional Budget Office report ==
This summary is based largely on the summary provided by the Congressional Budget Office, as ordered reported by the House Committee on Homeland Security on June 11, 2014. This is a public domain source.

The Honor Flight Network is a private organization that transports U.S. veterans to visit war memorials built to honor their service. H.R. 4812 would direct the Administrator of the Transportation Security Administration (TSA) to provide an expedited screening process for veterans traveling on flights operated by the Honor Flight Network or other not-for-profit organizations providing similar services to veterans.

The Congressional Budget Office (CBO) estimates that any increased costs to TSA under H.R. 4812 would be negligible, particularly because of the relatively small number of veterans who would qualify for expedited screening under the bill. Any such spending would be subject to the availability of appropriated funds. H.R. 4812 would not affect direct spending or revenues; therefore, pay-as-you-go procedures do not apply.

H.R. 4812 contains no intergovernmental or private-sector mandates as defined in the Unfunded Mandates Reform Act and would not affect the budgets of state, local, or tribal governments.

== Procedural history ==
The Honor Flight Act was introduced into the United States House of Representatives on June 9, 2014, by Rep. Cedric L. Richmond (D, LA-2). The bill was referred to the United States House Committee on Homeland Security and the United States House Homeland Security Subcommittee on Transportation Security. On July 3, 2014, the bill was reported alongside House Report 113-516. The bill was scheduled to be voted on under a suspension of the rules on July 8, 2014.

== See also ==
- List of bills in the 113th United States Congress
