= Fritz H. Windhorst =

American jurist, politician, and lawyer (1935–2023)

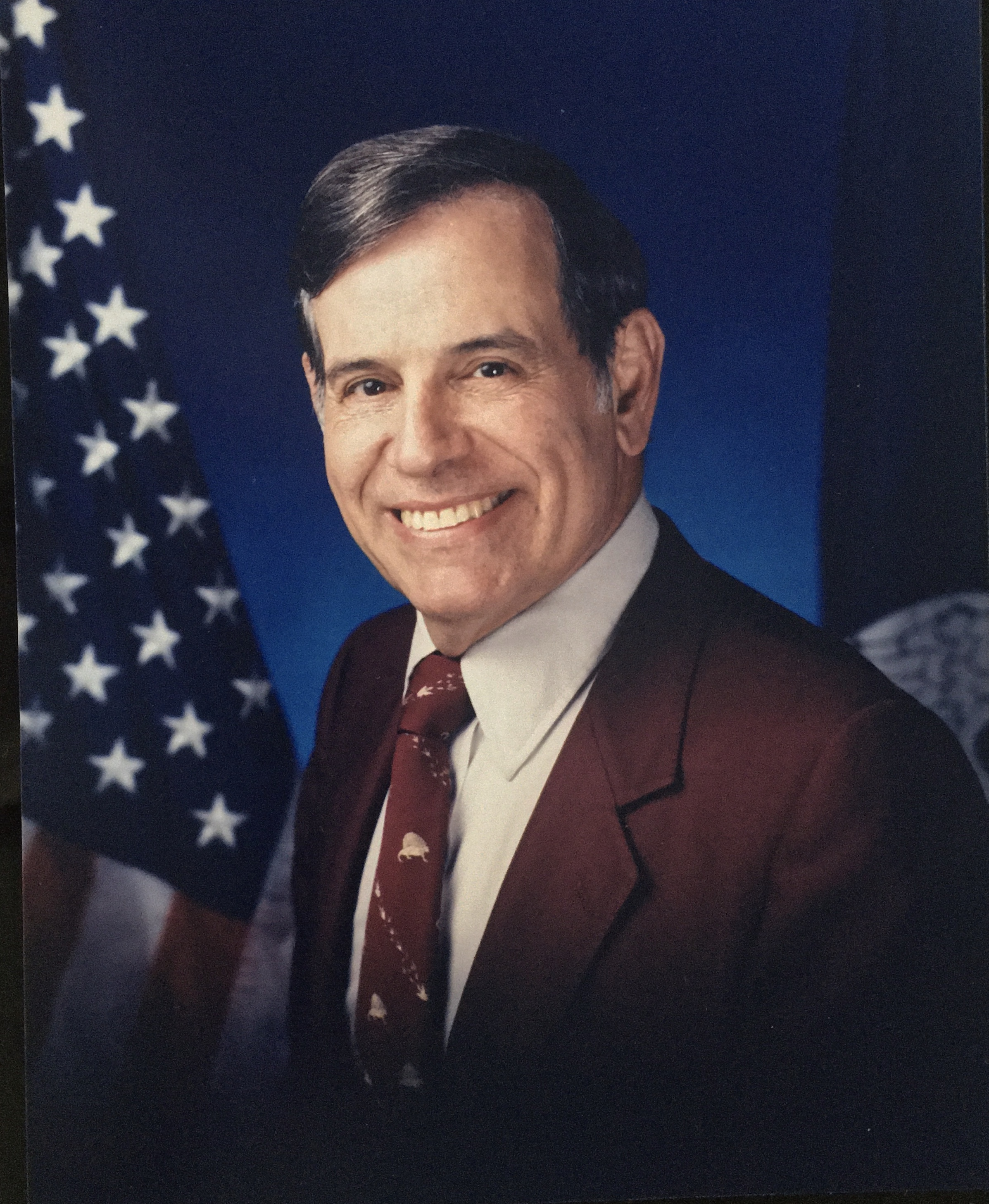
- Windhorst in 1984

Louisiana State Senator for Districts 7 and 8 (Orleans and Jefferson parishes)
- In office 1972–1992
- Preceded by: William J. Guste
- Succeeded by: Francis C. Heitmeier

United States Commissioner (United States District Court for the Eastern District of Louisiana)
- In office 1962–1969

Personal details
- Born: January 31, 1935 New Orleans, Louisiana, U.S.
- Died: August 27, 2023 (aged 88) New Orleans, Louisiana, U.S.
- Party: Democratic (1955–1985); Republican (from 1985)
- Education: Loyola University New Orleans College of Law
- Occupation: Jurist, politician and lawyer

Fritz H. Windhorst (January 31, 1935 – August 27, 2023) was an American jurist, lawyer and politician who was known for being appointed the youngest United States Commissioner and for serving five terms as a Louisiana State Senator for Districts 7 and 8 and representing both Orleans and Jefferson Parishes on the Westbank of the Greater New Orleans Region.

== Early life and education ==
Fritz H. Windhorst was born on January 31, 1935, in New Orleans, Louisiana to parents (Jennie Motto Windhorst and Richard Edward Windhorst, Sr.) of Italian and German descent, respectively. He was raised in the Irish Channel area of New Orleans, graduated from Redemptorist High School and received his law degree from Loyola University New Orleans College of Law.

== U.S. Commissioner ==
From 1962 to 1969, Windhorst was U.S. Commissioner. From 1955 to 1962, Windhorst worked on the staff of Judge Herbert W. Christenberry in the United States District Court for the Eastern District of Louisiana as a court clerk and court crier and attended Loyola University New Orleans College of Law night school. In October 1962, Windhorst was appointed the youngest ever U.S. Commissioner for the Eastern District of Louisiana. During his tenure as U.S. Commissioner, Windhorst was a member of the National Association of United States Commissioners (NAUSC) in leadership roles, including Director representing the federal 5th Circuit (1964), 2nd Vice President (1965 and 1966), and Chairman of the NAUSC Legislative Committee (1968). During his NAUSC tenure, Windhorst helped draft and promote legislation for a U.S. Magistrate system to replace that of U.S. Commissioners, which led to the creation and passage of the Federal Magistrate Act of 1968. Notable cases that came before U.S. Commissioner Windhorst included Carlos Marcello and H. Rap Brown.

== Political life ==
In 1969 Windhorst resigned his U.S. Commissioner post and served five terms as Louisiana State Senator (1972–1992) representing the Westbank of area of Orleans and Jefferson parishes – Louisiana Senate District 8 (1972–1984) and Louisiana Senate District 7 (1984–1992) as a Democrat and from 1985 as a Republican. He served as floor leader for three different Louisiana Governors Edwin Edwards, Dave Treen, and Buddy Roemer both as a Democrat and a Republican. Windhorst also served on the Judicial Council of the Supreme Court of Louisiana as the representative for the Louisiana legislature.

== Senate Elections ==
Windhorst won his first Senate race in 1971 by defeating Senate incumbent Olaf Fink and Butch Ward in the Democratic primaries and then the Republican candidate in the February 1972 general election. He was elected without opposition for his 1976, 1980, and 1984 terms. He won reelection for the 1988 term with over 75% or the vote. Windhorst announced his retirement on the Senate floor in 1991.

== Crescent City Connection Bridge ==
In 1970 Windhorst helped form the Algiers Bridge Committee to promote a second New Orleans bridge crossing the Mississippi River. As a legislator, Windhorst brought legislation for the funding, construction, and naming of what was originally referred to as GNO Bridge 2 (the second Greater New Orleans Bridge, built parallel to the existing span). The new bridge was an overarching part of Windhorst's Senate career. The Legislature passed Windhorst's Senate Bill 651 to approve $400 million flexible funding for the new bridge. Governor Edwin Edwards named Windhorst the "one-man committee" to decide when tolls would be imposed on the existing bridge to help fund the new bridge. Windhorst was master of ceremonies for the September 1988 ribbon cutting on the new bridge. In 1989 Windhorst and The Times-Picayune newspaper sponsored the Name the Bridge Contest to name the two bridges, with the winning entry submitted by Jennifer Grodsky of St. Clement of Rome School in Metairie, Louisiana.

== Personal life and death ==
Windhorst was married three times: Gwendolyn Chaplain Windhorst (1954–61), Josephine Vita Windhorst (1961–84), and Barbara Turner Windhorst (1986–2023). During a 1986 meeting, President Ronald Reagan helped Windhorst propose to Barbara Turner, which Reagan later recognized in a handwritten letter. Windhorst has three children: Stephen J. Windhorst, a graduate of Tulane University and Tulane University Law School who served in the Louisiana House of Representatives and is currently a judge on the Louisiana Court of Appeal for the Fifth Circuit; Judith Windhorst Cahill, a graduate of the University of Notre Dame and Harvard Law School and an attorney with the Jones Walker LLP law firm in New Orleans, Louisiana; and Stephanie Chisholm Hildebrandt, a graduate of Georgetown University and Tulane University Law School and General Counsel of Archrock, Inc.

Fritz H. Windhorst died in New Orleans on August 27, 2023, at the age of 88.
