= Cedric Richmond =

American politician (born 1973)

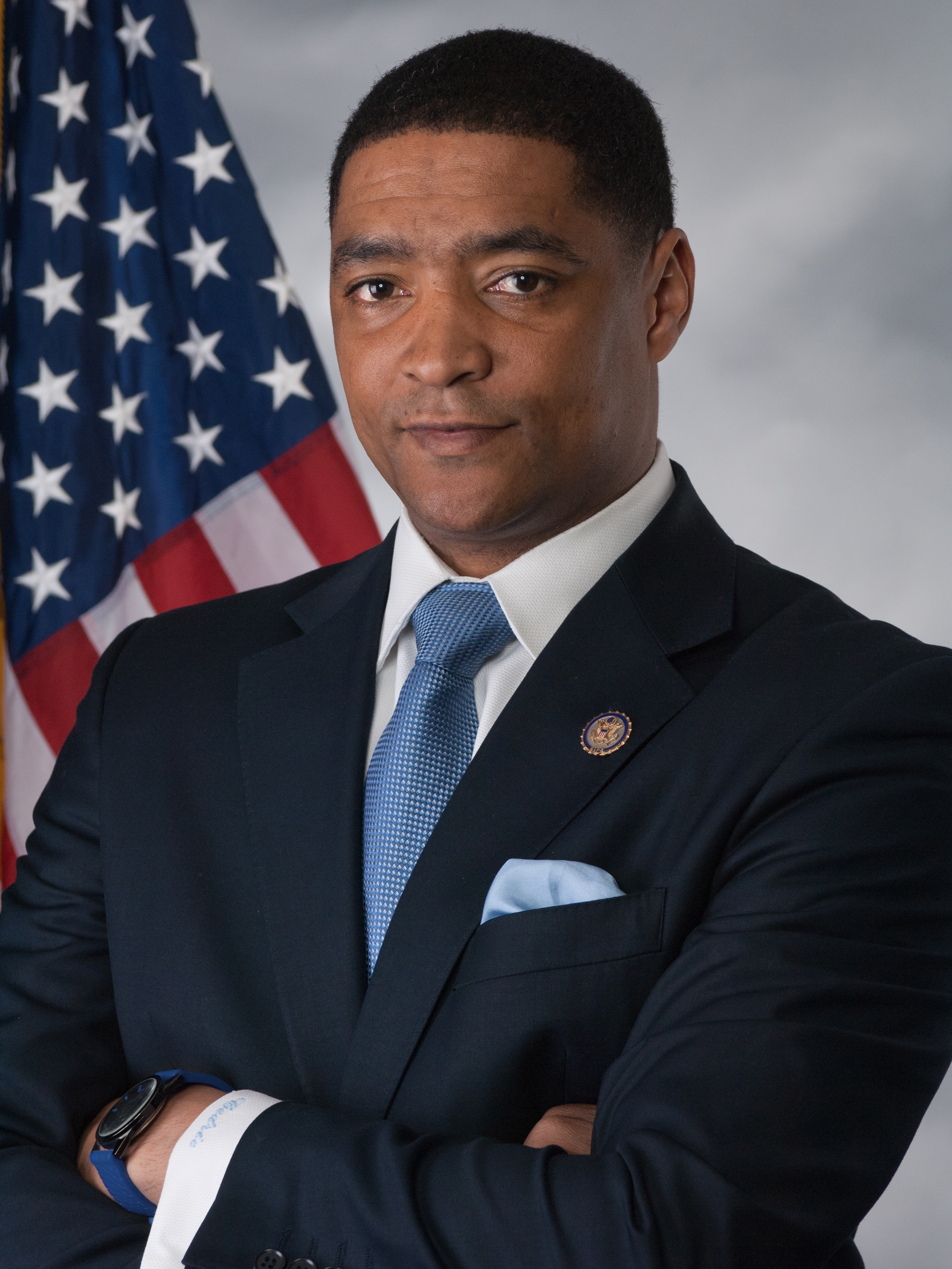
- Official portrait, 2011

Director of the White House Office of Public Engagement
- In office January 20, 2021 – May 18, 2022
- President: Joe Biden
- Deputy: Adrian Saenz
- Preceded by: Tim Pataki
- Succeeded by: Keisha Lance Bottoms

Senior Advisor to the President
- In office January 20, 2021 – May 18, 2022
- President: Joe Biden
- Preceded by: Jared Kushner; Stephen Miller; Ivanka Trump
- Succeeded by: Julie Chávez Rodriguez; Keisha Lance Bottoms

Chair of the Congressional Black Caucus
- In office January 3, 2017 – January 3, 2019
- Preceded by: G. K. Butterfield
- Succeeded by: Karen Bass

Member of the U.S. House of Representatives from Louisiana's 2nd district
- In office January 3, 2011 – January 15, 2021
- Preceded by: Joseph Cao
- Succeeded by: Troy Carter

Member of the Louisiana House of Representatives from the 101st district
- In office January 6, 2000 – January 3, 2011
- Preceded by: Naomi White Farve
- Succeeded by: Wesley T. Bishop

Personal details
- Born: Cedric Levan Richmond; September 13, 1973 (age 53) New Orleans, Louisiana, U.S.
- Party: Democratic
- Spouse: Raquel Greenup (m. 2015)
- Children: 1
- Education: Morehouse College (BA); Tulane University (JD)

Cedric Levan Richmond (born September 13, 1973) is an American attorney, politician, and political advisor who is a senior adviser to the Democratic National Committee. A member of the Democratic Party, Richmond represented the 101st district in the Louisiana House of Representatives from 2000 to 2011. Richmond was a member of the United States House of Representatives from Louisiana's 2nd congressional district from 2011 to 2021. His district included most of New Orleans.

From 2017 to 2019, Richmond chaired the Congressional Black Caucus. Beginning with his third term, he was the only Louisiana Democrat serving in either chamber of the United States Congress. In 2019, he was named the first national co-chair of Joe Biden's 2020 presidential campaign. On September 5, 2020, he was named a co-chair of Biden's presidential transition. On November 17, 2020, Richmond announced he would leave Congress in January 2021 to serve as Senior Advisor to the President and director of the White House Office of Public Liaison, which Biden renamed the White House Office of Public Engagement.

== Early life and education ==
Richmond was born in New Orleans in 1973 and raised in New Orleans East, where he attended public schools. His father died when he was seven years old. His mother was a public school teacher and small business owner. Richmond graduated from Benjamin Franklin High School. He earned a Bachelor of Arts from Morehouse College, and a Juris Doctor from Tulane School of Law. He also completed an executive program at Harvard University's John F. Kennedy School of Government. While at Morehouse, Richmond played college baseball as a pitcher for the Morehouse Maroon Tigers in the Southern Intercollegiate Athletic Conference.

== Louisiana legislature ==
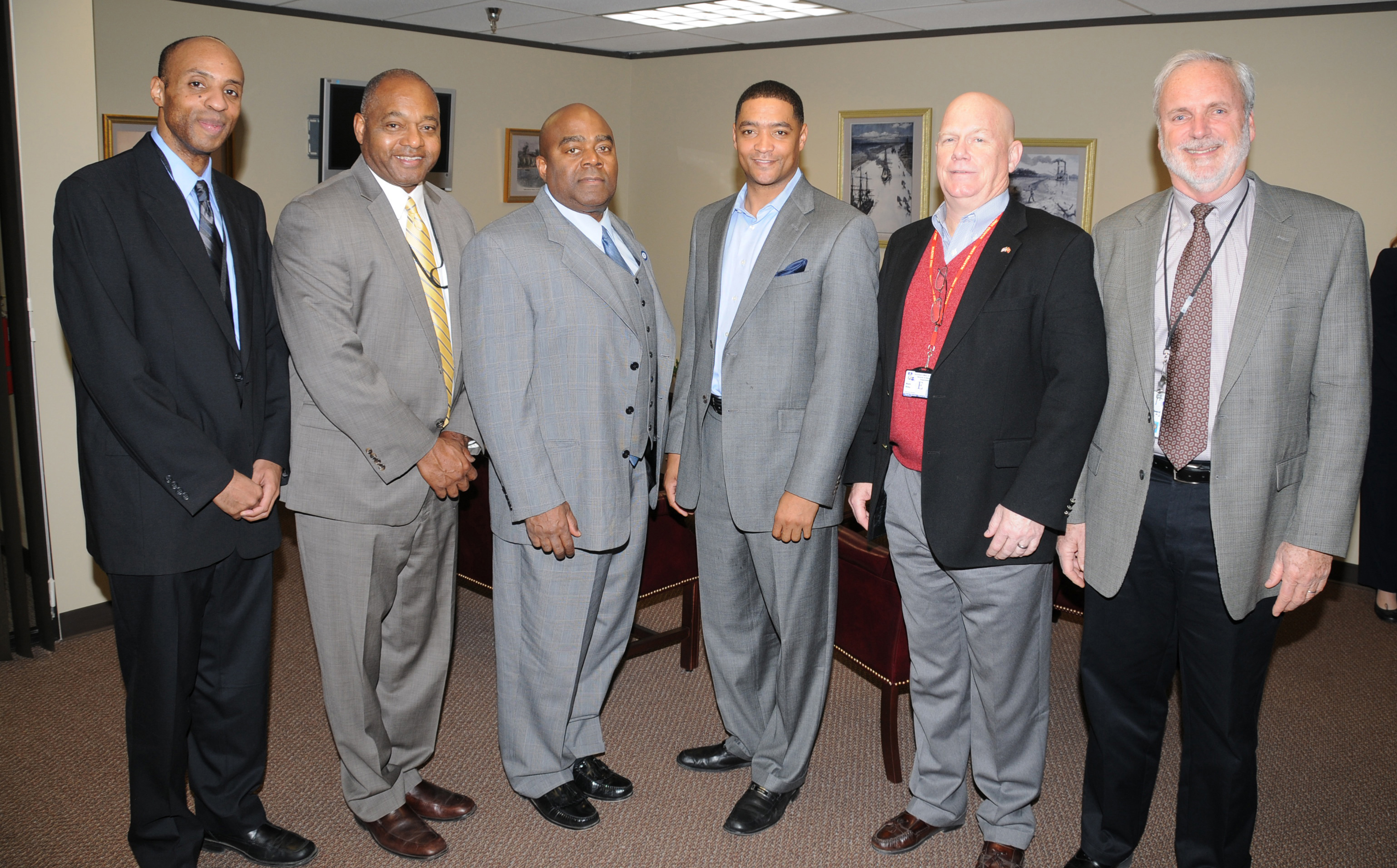
Senior FEMA leaders (left to right) Louisiana Recovery Office Deputy Director of Programs Andre Cadogan, LRO Acting Executive Director Joe Threat and Region 6 Administrator Tony Russell meeting with Louisiana State Representative Cedric Richmond, Governor's Office of Homeland Security and Emergency Preparedness Deputy Director Mark Riley and GOHSEP Assistant Deputy Director for Disaster Recovery Mark DeBosier

Richmond was elected and served as a member of the Louisiana House of Representatives from the 101st district (Orleans Parish) from 2000 to 2011. He was elected shortly after his 27th birthday and was one of the youngest legislators ever to serve in Louisiana when he took office. He served as the chairman of the House Committee on Judiciary and as a member of the House Ways and Means Committee, House Executive Committee, and the Legislative Audit Advisory Council.

== U.S. House of Representatives ==
Richmond was elected to the US House of Representatives from Louisiana's 2nd congressional district for the first time in 2010. He took office in 2011. He was reelected in 2012, 2014, 2016, 2018, and 2020. In 2012, Richmond publicly opposed a plan for Louisiana to redirect federal hurricane-recovery funds toward Superdome renovations, specifically raising concerns about the priorities of the Louisiana Stadium and Exposition District's facility funding.

On June 9, 2014, Richmond introduced the Honor Flight Act, a bill that would direct the Transportation Security Administration (TSA) to establish a process for providing expedited and dignified passenger screening services for veterans traveling on an Honor Flight to visit war memorials that had been built to honor their service.

That year Richmond defended his Republican colleague Vance McAllister, who had become embroiled in an alleged adultery scandal. Richmond said that he associated the controversy around McAllister with "gotcha moments" in which the "two parties in this country have gone overboard...and taken joy in the pain of their supposed opponents".

Richmond was one of a few Democrats who voted to authorize the Keystone XL pipeline. In 2020, he was described as the fifth-biggest recipient of money from fossil fuel donors among House Democrats. The League of Conservation Voters gave him one of the lowest ratings of all Democratic members of Congress.

Richmond was active in the Congressional Black Caucus. On November 30, 2016, he was elected chair of the Congressional Black Caucus for the 115th United States Congress.

On December 18, 2019, Richmond voted for the first impeachment of Donald Trump.

=== Elections ===
==== 2008 ====
Richmond came in third place in the seven-candidate primary election for the Democratic nomination for Louisiana's 2nd congressional district, behind U.S. Representative William J. Jefferson and television newscaster Helena Moreno. During a primary debate, Richmond accused Moreno of drug use, and she criticized him for his disqualification from the 2005 New Orleans City Council "D" district election.

Later in 2008, the Louisiana Supreme Court suspended Richmond's law license for six months in a 5–2 decision. It found that he had falsified a sworn statement claiming more than two years of residency in New Orleans's "D" district in order to be eligible for the district's city council seat.

==== 2010 ====
Richmond challenged Republican incumbent Joseph Cao for Louisiana's 2nd congressional district. Richmond was the first candidate in the 2010 elections to have President Barack Obama appear in a television ad on his behalf.

Most analysts considered Richmond a strong favorite to retake this seat for the Democrats, even in what was forecast to be a Republican year nationally. With a Cook Partisan Voting Index of D+25, the second district was the most Democratic district in the country to be represented by a Republican. Richmond won the November 2 election with 65% of the vote.

==== 2020 ====
Richmond's campaign received almost $113,000 from the oil and gas sector, which donated more than any other sector to his campaign. He was reelected with 63.6% of the vote.

=== Committee assignments ===
- Committee on Homeland Security
  - Subcommittee on Cybersecurity, Infrastructure Protection, and Security Technologies (chair)
  - Subcommittee on Emergency Preparedness, Response, and Recovery
- Committee on the Judiciary
  - Subcommittee on Courts, Intellectual Property, and the Internet
  - Subcommittee on Crime, Terrorism, and Homeland Security

=== Congressional caucuses ===
- Congressional Black Caucus
- New Democrat Coalition

=== Controversies ===
In January 2017, Richmond became involved in an argument with Republican lawmakers over whether a particular painting should continue to hang in the United States Capitol. The painting shows police officers apprehending suspects, and the police are depicted as pigs. It was painted by someone from Richmond's district who had won a local award, and Republicans objected to it. Richmond said that escalating the issue might "open up Pandora's Box" because there are other paintings that some people might also find offensive.

In March 2017, Richmond was criticized for making a crude joke about a controversial photograph of Kellyanne Conway kneeling on the Oval Office couch. Richmond appeared to compare Conway to Monica Lewinsky, saying, "I really just want to know what was going on there, because she really looked kind of familiar there in that position there. But don't answer. And I don't want you to refer back to the '90s." Richmond later said the joke was not meant to be sexual. "Since some people have interpreted my joke to mean something that it didn't. I think it is important to clarify what I meant", he said in a statement. "Where I grew up saying that someone is looking or acting 'familiar' simply means that they are behaving too comfortably."

=== Congressional Baseball Game ===
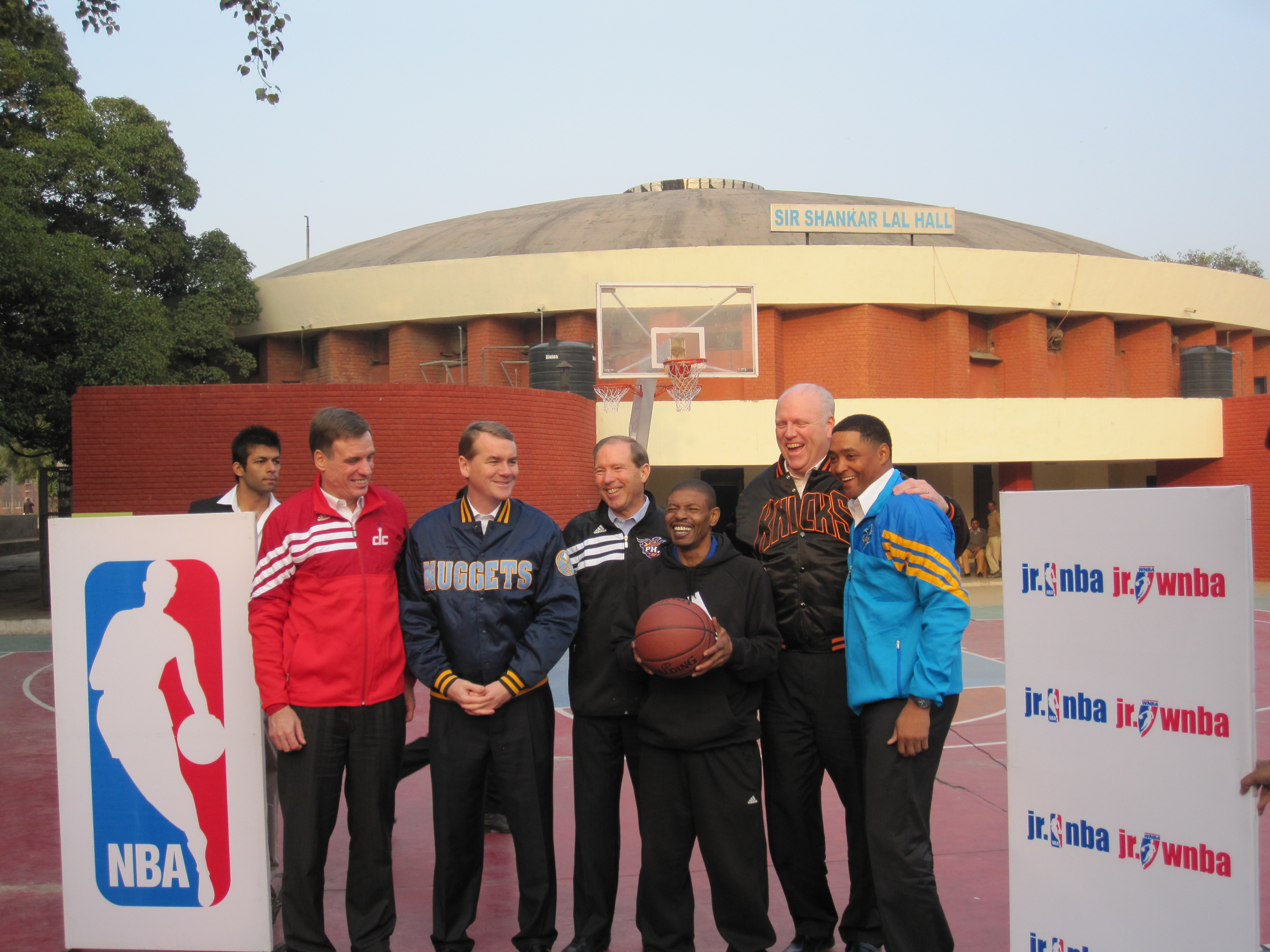
From left, Senator Mark Warner, Senator Michael Bennet, Senator Tom Udall, Former NBA player Muggsy Bogues, Congressman Joseph Crowley and Congressman Richmond.

Richmond played in the annual Congressional Baseball Game. He was the starting Democratic pitcher for each of the five years since his election and the Democrats won each game. He had a 2.85 earned run average, 1.67 walks plus hits per inning pitched and 45 strikeouts in his 27 innings pitched in that span. In 2016, Joe Barton, the Republican team manager, called him the best player to ever participate in the game. Richmond lost his first game in 2016, a day after participating through the night in the 2016 United States House of Representatives sit-in.

== Biden administration ==
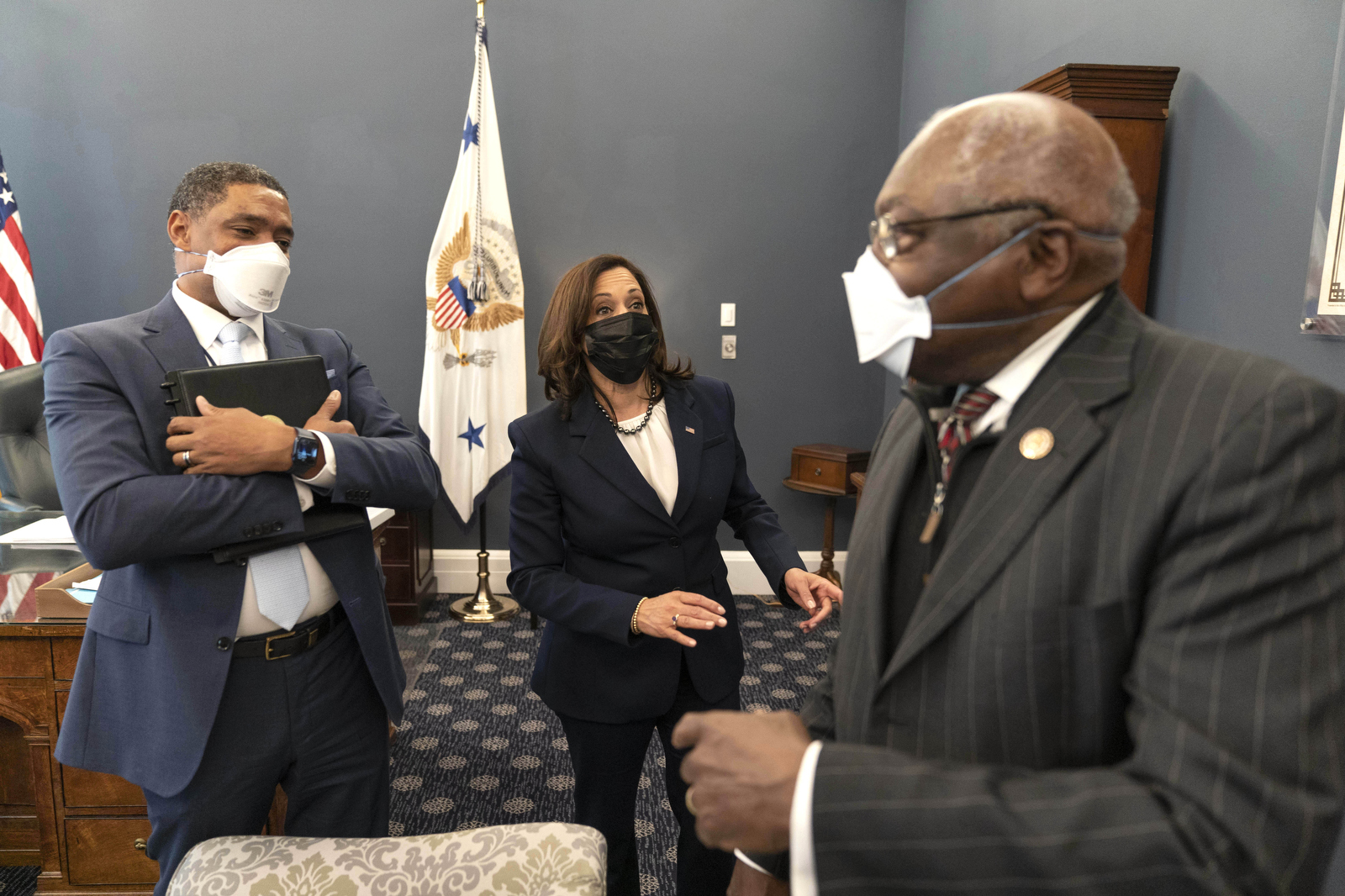
Richmond with Vice President Kamala Harris and House Whip Jim Clyburn meet in the West Wing, February 2021

Richmond was a national co-chair of the Joe Biden 2020 presidential campaign. On November 17, 2020, he announced that he would join the Biden administration as Senior Advisor to the President and director of the White House Office of Public Liaison. His resignation became official on January 15, 2021. His departure triggered a 2021 special election. Justice Democrats criticized Richmond's appointment, alleging that he was one of the top Democratic recipients of donations from the fossil fuel industry.

In an interview before the inauguration of Joe Biden, Richmond noted his potential work in reaching out to conservatives in different parts of the country. Richmond was reported to be working with the Biden administration on addressing reparations for slavery.

Richmond resigned from the White House on May 18, 2022, to become a senior adviser at the Democratic National Committee.

== Personal life ==
Richmond married Raquel Greenup in 2015.

== Electoral history ==
U.S. Representative, 2nd Congressional District November Election, 2016

Candidate	Affiliation	Support	Outcome
Kenneth Cutno	Democratic	28,855 (10%)	Defeated
Melvin Holden	Democratic	57,125 (20%)	Defeated
Cedric Richmond	Democratic	198,289 (70%)	Won

U.S. Representative, 2nd Congressional District-November Election, 2014

Candidate	Affiliation	Support	Outcome
David Brooks	No Party	16,327 (7%)	Defeated
Samuel Davenport	Libertarian	15,237 (7%)	Defeated
Gary Landrieu	Democratic	37,805 (17%)	Defeated
Cedric Richmond	Democratic	152,201 (69%)	Won

U.S. Representative, 2nd Congressional District-November Election, 2012

Candidate	Affiliation	Support	Outcome
Josue Larose	Republican	11,345 (4%)	Defeated
Caleb Trotter	Libertarian	6,791 (2%)	Defeated
Dwayne Bailey	Republican	38,801 (14%)	Defeated
Gary Landrieu	Democratic	71,916 (25%)	Defeated
Cedric Richmond	Democratic	158,501 (55%)	Won

U.S. Representative, 2nd Congressional District-Democratic Party, 2010 August 28, 2010

Candidate	Affiliation	Support	Outcome
Eugene Green	Democratic	2,497 (10%)	Defeated
Gary Johnson	Democratic	1,911 (8%)	Defeated
Juan LaFonta	Democratic	5,166 (21%)	Defeated
Cedric Richmond	Democratic	14,622 (60%)	Won

U.S. Representative, 2nd Congressional District-Democratic Party, 2008

Threshold > 50%

First Ballot, November 2, 2004

Candidate	Affiliation	Support	Outcome
James Carter	Democratic	9,286 (13%)	Defeated
Troy Carter	Democratic	5,797 (8%)	Defeated
William J. Jefferson	Democratic	17,510 (25%)	Run-off
Byron L. Lee	Democratic	8,979 (13%)	Defeated
Helena Moreno	Democratic	13,795 (20%)	Run-off
Cedric Richmond	Democratic	12,095 (17%)	Defeated
Kenya J. H. Smith	Democratic	1,749 (3%)	Defeated

Louisiana State Representative, 101st District, 2007

October 20, 2007

Candidate	Affiliation	Support	Outcome
Cedric L. Richmond	Democratic	2,944 (73%)	Elected
Roland Barthe	Democratic	1,107 (27%)	Defeated

Louisiana State Representative, 101st District, 2003

October 4, 2003

Candidate	Affiliation	Support	Outcome
Cedric Richmond	Democratic	6,943 (78%)	Elected
Willie Jones Jr.	Democratic	1,906 (22%)	Defeated

Louisiana State Representative, 101st District, 1999

Threshold > 50%

First Ballot, October 23, 1999

Candidate	Affiliation	Support	Outcome
Wesley T. Bishop	Democratic	1,241 (14%)	Defeated
Naomi White Farve	Democratic	1,835 (21%)	Defeated
Cedric Richmond	Democratic	3,480 (40%)	Run-off
Eddie Scott	Democratic	2,119 (24%)	Run-off

Second Ballot, November 20, 1999

Candidate	Affiliation	Support	Outcome
Cedric Richmond	Democratic	3,980 (63%)	Elected
Eddie Scott	Democratic	2,361 (37%)	Defeated

U.S. House of Representatives
Preceded by Joseph Cao	Member of the U.S. House of Representatives from Louisiana's 2nd congressional district 2011–2021	Succeeded by Troy Carter
Preceded by G. K. Butterfield	Chair of the Congressional Black Caucus; 2017–2019	Succeeded by Karen Bass
Political offices
Preceded by Timothy Pataki	Director of the White House Office of Public Engagement; 2021–2022	Succeeded by Adrian Saenz; Acting
U.S. order of precedence (ceremonial)
Preceded by Rodney Alexander as Former U.S. Representative	Order of precedence of the United States as Former U.S. Representative	Succeeded by Garret Graves as Former U.S. Representative
