= 2022 Louisiana elections =

A general election was held in the U.S. state of Louisiana on Tuesday, November 8, 2022. The Class III U.S. Senate seat representing the state were up for election, as well as six U.S. Representatives. A mayoral election was also held on the same day for the city Shreveport, with a runoff on December 10.
