= Francis C. Heitmeier =

American politician

Louisiana State Senator for District 7 (Orleans, Jefferson and Plaquemines parishes)
- In office 1992–2008
- Preceded by: Fritz H. Windhorst
- Succeeded by: David Heitmeier

Louisiana State Representative for Orleans Parish
- In office 1984–1992
- Preceded by: Jon D. Johnson
- Succeeded by: Troy A. Carter

Personal details
- Born: August 2, 1950 (age 76) New Orleans, Louisiana, USA
- Party: Democratic
- Spouse: Rai Lynn Umbach Heitmeier
- Relations: David Heitmeier (brother)
- Education: Nicholls State University, Holy Cross HS
- Occupation: Lobbyist Assistant manager of a telephone company

Francis C. Heitmeier (born August 2, 1950) is Louisiana politician who served in the Louisiana State Senate, representing Orleans, Jefferson, and Plaquemines parishes, from 1991 to 2007.

Raised in the Algiers neighborhood of New Orleans, Heitmeier received his undergraduate degree from Nicholls State University in Thibodaux, Louisiana. He served on the Orleans Parish Democratic Executive Committee from 1978 to 1984 and in the Louisiana House of Representatives from 1984 to 1992.

Heitmeier won election to the state senate in 1991 by a large margin, and was reelected in a contested election in 1995, thereafter running unopposed in 1999 and 2003. Ineligible to run in 2007 due to term limits, he instead ran in a special election for Louisiana Secretary of State in 2006, the office having been vacated by the death of incumbent W. Fox McKeithen. Heitmeier finished the first round of voting in second place, but withdrew from the runoff, complaining of lack of funds.

Louisiana State Senate
| Preceded by Fritz Windhorst | Louisiana State Senator for District 7 (Orleans, Jefferson, and Plaquemines parishes); Francis C. Heitmeier; 1992–2008 | Succeeded by David Heitmeier |
| Preceded by Jon D. Johnson | Louisiana State Representative for District 102 (Orleans Parish); Francis C. Heitmeier; 1984–1992 | Succeeded by Troy A. Carter |
