= Regina Barrow =

American politician

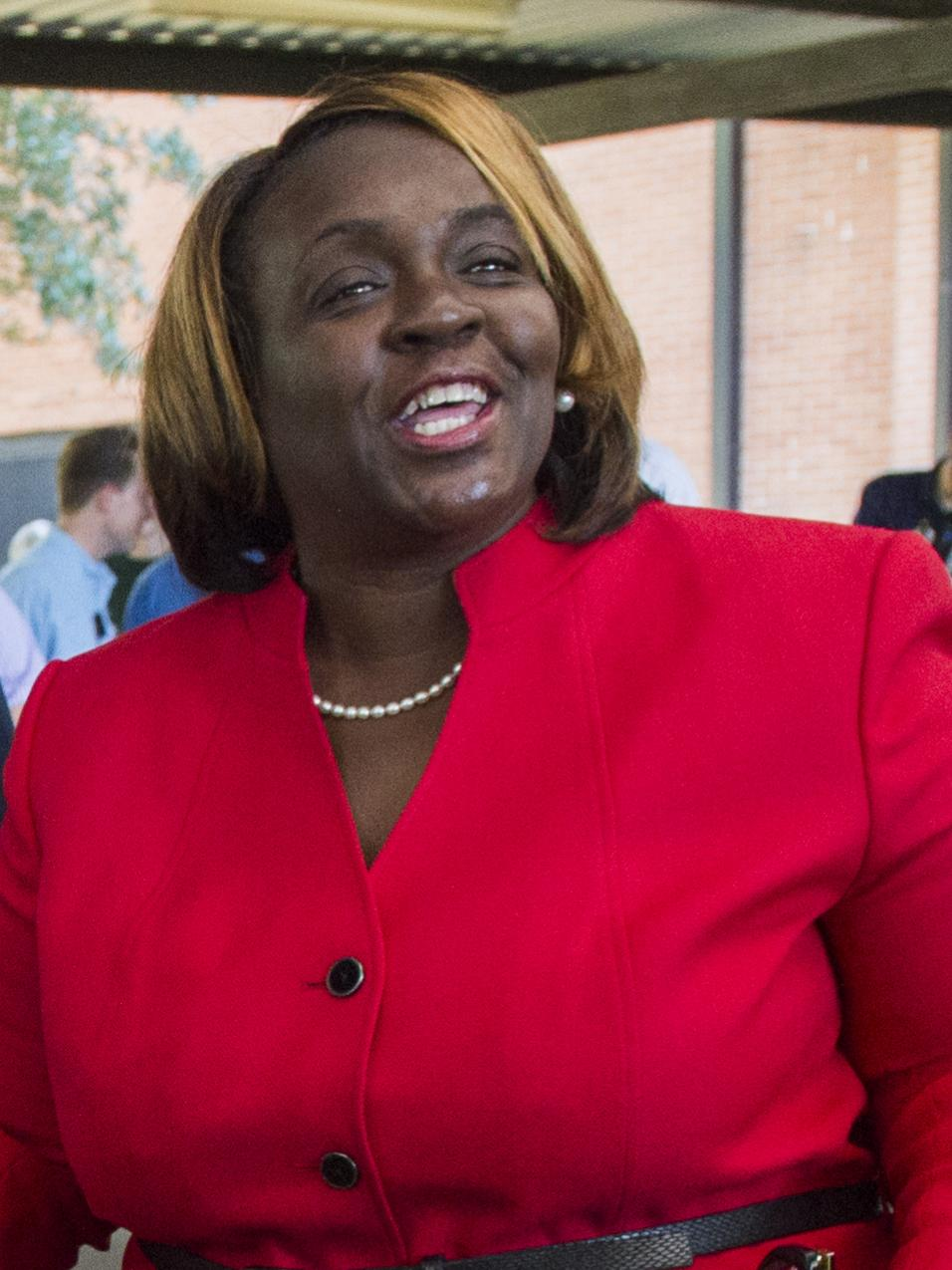

President pro tempore of the Louisiana Senate
- Incumbent
- Assumed office January 8, 2024
- Preceded by: Beth Mizell

Member of the Louisiana Senate from the 15th district
- Incumbent
- Assumed office January 11, 2016
- Preceded by: Sharon Weston Broome

Member of the Louisiana House of Representatives from the 29th district
- In office 2005–2016

Personal details
- Born: Wilkinson County, Mississippi, U.S.
- Party: Democratic
- Spouse: James
- Children: 2
- Education: Baton Rouge School of Computers (AS); Southern University (attended)

Regina Ashford Barrow is an American politician serving as a member of the Louisiana State Senate from the 15th district. Elected in November 2015, she assumed office on January 11, 2016. Barrow previously represented the 29th district in the Louisiana House of Representatives from 2005 to 2016.

== Early life and education ==
Barrow was born in Wilkinson County, Mississippi and raised in Baton Rouge, Louisiana. She earned an associate degree in accounting from the Baton Rouge School of Computers and attended Southern University.

== Career ==
From 1998 to 2005, Barrow was the executive director of Rise Up Louisiana. She then served as a legislative assistant for Sharon Weston Broome. She was a member of the Louisiana House of Representatives from 2005 to 2016, after which she was elected to the Louisiana State Senate. Since 2019, she has also served as vice chair of the Senate Health & Welfare Committee. As vice chair, Barrow authored a measure that requires female prisoners in Louisiana state prisons to have access to feminine hygiene products. She has also worked to pass restrictive abortion laws in the state. Since January 8, 2024 she has been President pro tempore of the Louisiana Senate, succeeding Beth Mizell.

Louisiana State Senate
Preceded by Beth Mizell	President pro tempore of the Louisiana Senate; 2024–present	Incumbent
