= David Heitmeier =

American politician

Member of the Louisiana State Senate from the 7th district
- In office 2008 – January 11, 2016
- Preceded by: Francis C. Heitmeier
- Succeeded by: Troy Carter

Personal details
- Born: David Richard Heitmeier; 1961 (age 64–65) Algiers, New Orleans, U.S.
- Party: Democratic
- Spouse: Cathy Heitmeier
- Children: 2
- Relatives: Francis C. Heitmeier (brother)
- Education: University of Louisiana at Lafayette; University of Houston

David Richard Heitmeier (born 1961) is an American politician. He served as a Democratic member for the 7th district of the Louisiana State Senate.

Born in Algiers, New Orleans, Heitmeier attended the University of Louisiana at Lafayette, where he earned his Bachelor of Science degree in 1984. He then attended the University of Houston, graduating in 1987.

In 2008, Heitmeier was elected to represent the 7th district in the Louisiana State Senate, succeeding his brother Francis C. Heitmeier, who had reached the term limit. In 2016, he was succeeded by Troy Carter.
