= Delisha Boyd =

American politician and real estate broker

Member of the Louisiana House of Representatives from the 102nd district
- Incumbent
- Assumed office November 29, 2021
- Preceded by: Gary Carter Jr.

Personal details
- Party: Democratic
- Education: Southern University at New Orleans (BBA); University of New Orleans (MFA); University of Phoenix (MBA)

Delisha Boyd is an American politician and real estate broker serving as a member of the Louisiana House of Representatives from the 102nd district. She assumed office on November 29, 2021.

== Early life and education ==
Boyd was raised in Uptown New Orleans and graduated from Xavier University Preparatory School. She earned a Bachelor of Business Administration from Southern University at New Orleans, a Master of Business Administration from the University of Phoenix.Doctorate of Business Administration(abd)

== Career ==
From 1993 to 2011, Boyd operated a talent and casting agency. From 2011 to 2014, she worked as an associate real estate broker and investor. In 2014, she established Delisha Boyd, LLC, a full-serviced real estate brokerage. She's licensed in Georgia, Louisiana and Mississippi. Since 2015, Boyd has also worked as a notary. She was elected to the Louisiana House of Representatives in a November 2021 special election.
