= Louisiana's 15th State Senate district =

American legislative district

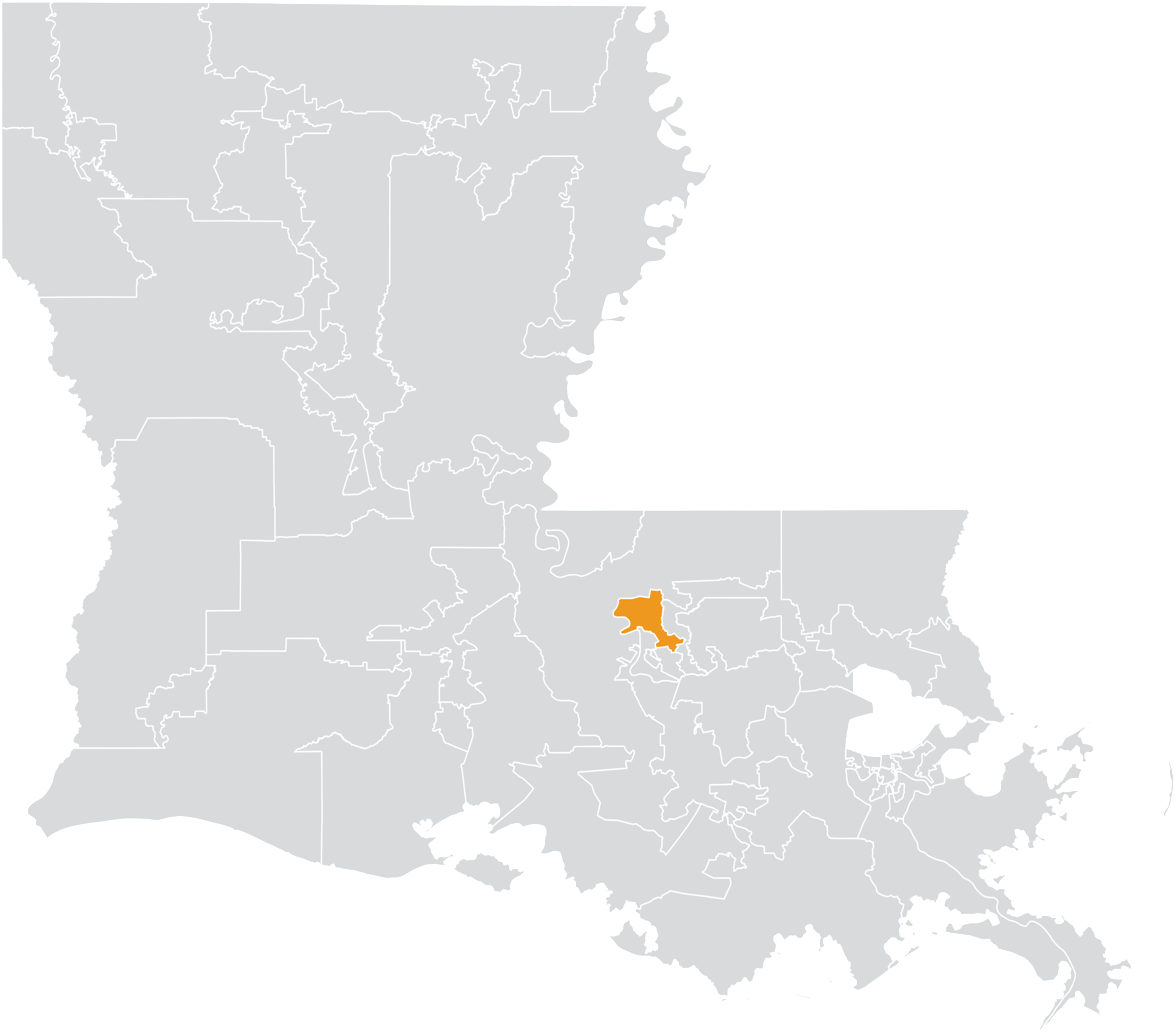
Senator
Regina Barrow; D–Baton Rouge
- Registration: 67.4% Democratic; 10.9% Republican; 21.6% No party preference
- Demographics: 16% White; 75% Black; 4% Hispanic; 3% Asian; 1% Other
- Population (2019): 118,559
- Registered voters: 71,390

Louisiana's 15th State Senate district is one of 39 districts in the Louisiana State Senate. It has been represented by Democrat Regina Barrow since 2016, succeeding fellow Democrat Sharon Weston Broome.

== Geography ==
District 15 covers northern East Baton Rouge Parish, including parts of Baton Rouge, Central, and Zachary, and all of Baker.

The district overlaps with Louisiana's 2nd and 6th congressional districts, and with the 29th, 61st, 62nd, 63rd, 64th, 65th, 69th, and 101st districts of the Louisiana House of Representatives.

== Recent election results ==
Louisiana uses a jungle primary system. If no candidate receives 50% in the first round of voting, when all candidates appear on the same ballot regardless of party, the top-two finishers advance to a runoff election.

=== 2019 ===
2019 Louisiana State Senate election, District 15
Party	Candidate	Votes	%
Democratic	Regina Barrow (incumbent)	22,858	74.5
Democratic	Gary Chambers	7,829	25.5
Total votes		30,687	100
Democratic hold			

=== 2015 ===
2015 Louisiana State Senate election, District 15
Party	Candidate	Votes	%
Democratic	Regina Barrow	14,101	53.1
Democratic	Dalton W. Honoré	8,796	33.1
Republican	Jerrie Williams	3,683	13.9
Total votes		26,580	100
Democratic hold			

=== 2011 ===
2011 Louisiana State Senate election, District 15
Party	Candidate	Votes	%
Democratic	Sharon Weston Broome (incumbent)	Unopposed	100
Total votes		Unopposed	100
Democratic hold			

=== Federal and statewide results ===
Year	Office	Results
2020	President	Biden 78.6–19.8%
2019	Governor (runoff)	Edwards 86.1–13.9%
2016	President	Clinton 77.7–19.7%
2015	Governor (runoff)	Edwards 85.9–14.1%
2014	Senate (runoff)	Landrieu 78.4–21.6%
2012	President	Obama 77.0–22.1%
