= Jeff Arnold (politician) =

American politician

Member of the Louisiana House of Representatives from the 102nd district
- In office April 2002 – January 11, 2016
- Preceded by: Jacquelyn Brechtel Clarkson
- Succeeded by: Gary Carter, Jr.

Personal details
- Born: Jeffery James Arnold; June 26, 1967 (age 59)
- Party: Democratic
- Education: Southeastern Louisiana University
- Occupation: Businessman

Jeffery James Arnold (born July 26, 1967) is an American businessman and former politician who is the Louisiana Executive Director of America First Energy Project. Arnold was previously the CEO of the Association of Louisiana Electric Cooperatives. He was the former senior vice president of First NBC Bank in New Orleans, Louisiana.

Arnold was also the former dean of the Louisiana House of Representatives, where he represented District 102, which encompasses the Algiers neighborhood. Arnold was first sent to the House in a special election held on April 6, 2002. He was hence term-limited and was ineligible to seek a fourth four-year term in the 2015 legislative elections. Instead, Arnold ran unsuccessfully for the District 7 seat in the Louisiana State Senate, which encompasses parts of the west bank of Orleans, Jefferson, and Plaquemines parishes.

== Political career ==
In his first election, he received 65.8% of the vote over four other Democratic candidates. In his most recent election on October 22, 2011, he polled 81.2 percent of the vote over an intraparty rival named Carlos Williams.

Arnold served as the Chairman of the House Commerce Committee (2008–12) and Chairman of the House Judiciary Committee (2012–2016).

Arnold was term limited from the House of Representatives and was a candidate in the surprise opening for State Senate race in 2015. He was defeated by fellow Democrat Troy Carter, a former member of the New Orleans City Council. Carter received 12,935 votes (56.8%); Arnold, 9,852 (43.2%).

Louisiana House of Representatives
Preceded by Jacquelyn Brechtel Clarkson	Louisiana State Representative for District 102 (Algiers section of New Orleans); Jeffery James "Jeff" Arnold; 2002–2016	Succeeded by Gary Carter, Jr.
