= Troy Carter (politician) =

American politician (born 1963)

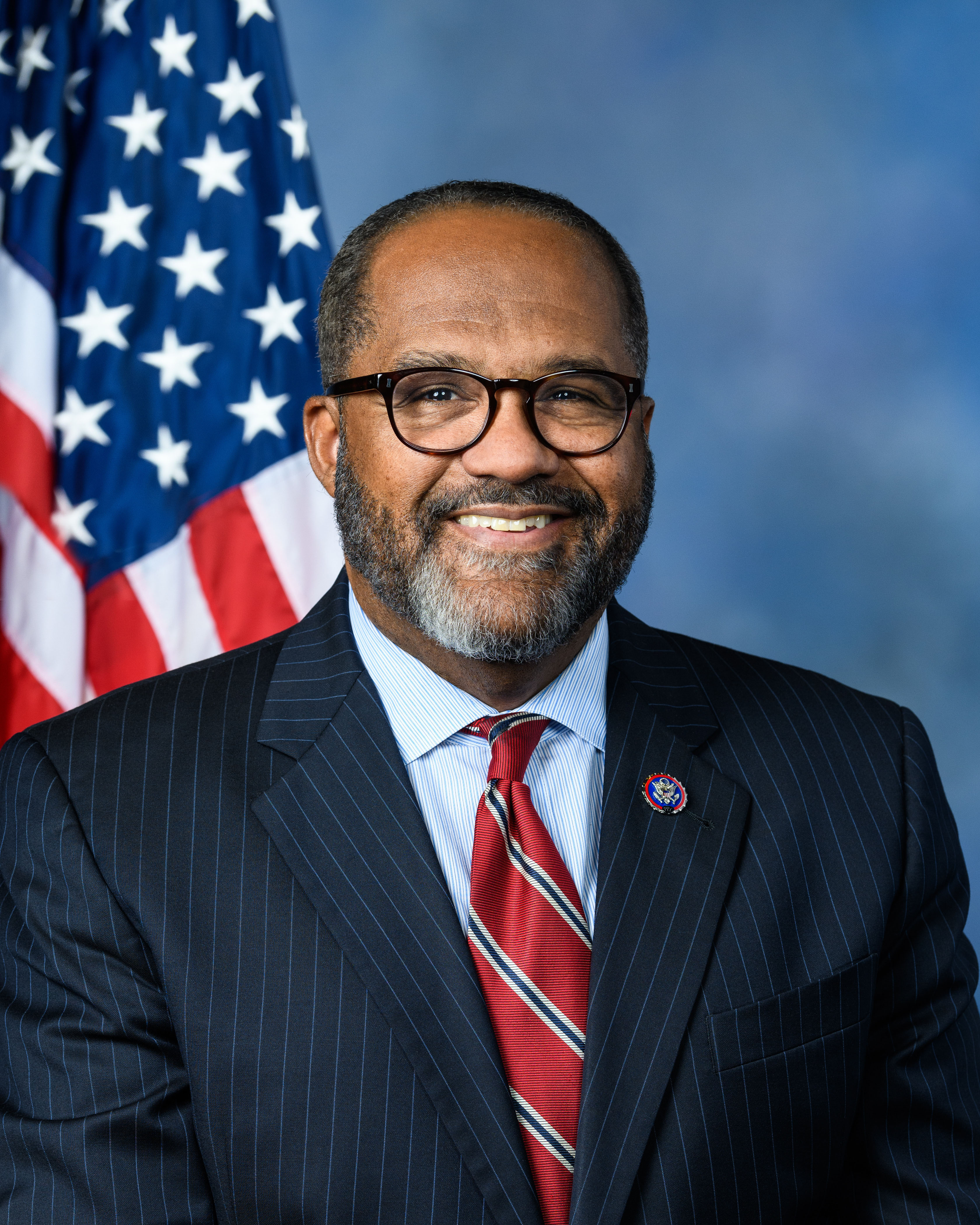

Member of the U.S. House of Representatives from Louisiana's 2nd district
- Incumbent
- Assumed office April 24, 2021 (Note: Carter's official service begins on the date of the special election, while he was not sworn in until May 11, 2021.)
- Preceded by: Cedric Richmond

Minority Leader of the Louisiana State Senate
- In office January 11, 2016 – May 10, 2021
- Preceded by: Eric LaFleur
- Succeeded by: Gerald Boudreaux

Member of the Louisiana State Senate from the 7th district
- In office January 11, 2016 – May 10, 2021
- Preceded by: David Heitmeier
- Succeeded by: Gary Carter Jr.

Member of the New Orleans City Council from District C
- In office 1994–2002
- Preceded by: Jackie Clarkson
- Succeeded by: Jackie Clarkson

Member of the Louisiana House of Representatives from the 102nd district
- In office January 1992 – January 1994
- Preceded by: Francis Heitmeier
- Succeeded by: Jackie Clarkson

Personal details
- Born: Troy Anthony Carter Sr. October 26, 1963 (age 63) New Orleans, Louisiana, U.S.
- Party: Democratic
- Spouse: Andreé Navarro
- Children: 2
- Education: Xavier University of Louisiana (BA); Carnegie Mellon University (attended); University of Holy Cross (MS)
- Website: House website Campaign website

Troy Anthony Carter Sr. (born October 26, 1963) is an American politician serving as the U.S. representative for Louisiana's 2nd congressional district since 2021. He was previously a member of the Louisiana State Senate for the 7th district. A member of the Democratic Party, Carter also previously served on the New Orleans City Council and as a member of the Louisiana House of Representatives. He is currently one of two Democrats in Louisiana's congressional delegation.

== Early life and education ==
Carter was born in New Orleans. After graduating from Oliver Perry Walker High School in Algiers, he attended Xavier University of Louisiana, where he earned a Bachelor of Arts degree in business administration and political science. He began a master's at Carnegie Mellon University's School of Urban and Public Affairs and completed an executive training program at Harvard Kennedy School. He later received a Master of Science in management from the University of Holy Cross. Carter was raised Catholic.

== Early career ==
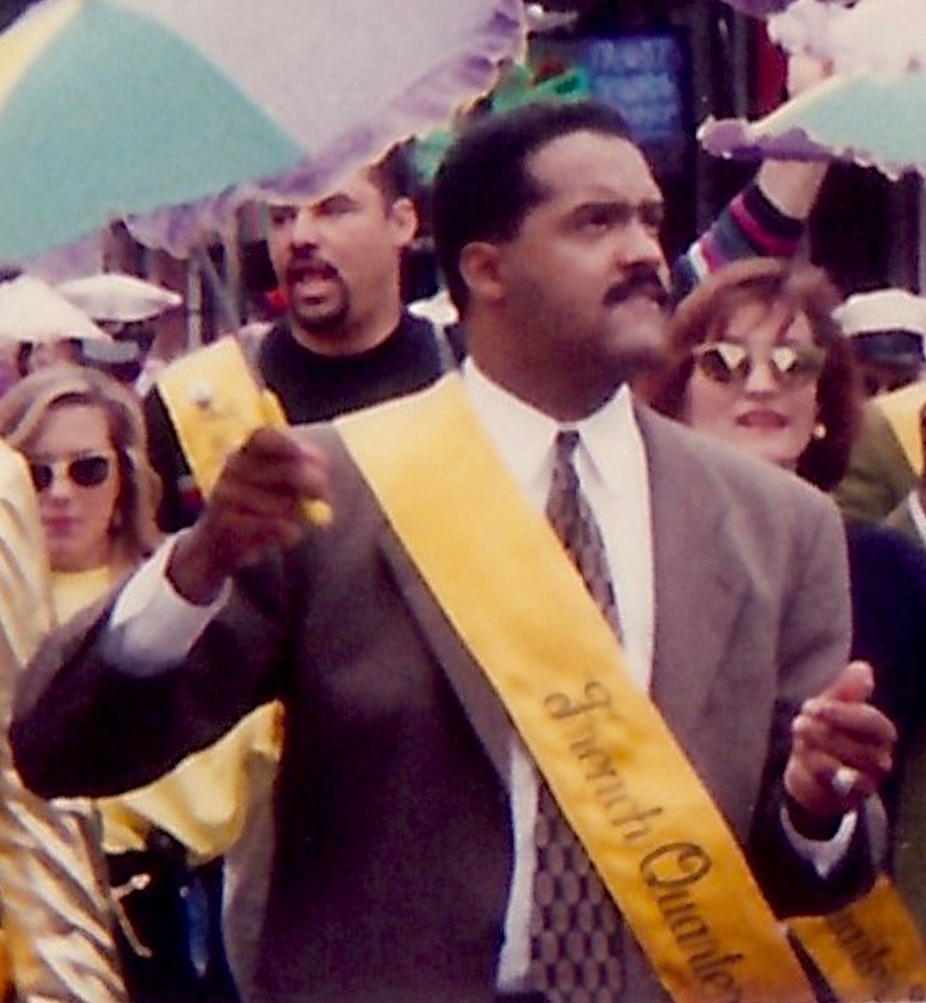
Carter at the 1996 French Quarter Festival

Carter has been an adjunct political science instructor at Xavier University of Louisiana. Before his election to the state legislature, he served six years as executive assistant to New Orleans mayor Sidney Barthelemy.

Carter was elected as a member of the Louisiana House of Representatives in 1991, becoming the first African-American to serve District 102 in the Louisiana House. As a state representative in 1993, he introduced legislation to prohibit discrimination against LGBTQ individuals. After his election to the Louisiana State Senate, he filed similar legislation in 2017 and 2020.

In 1994, he was elected to represent District C on the New Orleans City Council. He served until 2002, when he unsuccessfully ran for mayor, losing the primary election to Ray Nagin and Richard Pennington. He was an unsuccessful candidate for Louisiana's 2nd congressional district seat in 2006 against then-incumbent William J. Jefferson.

After several years out of public office, Carter was elected to the Louisiana Senate in 2015. He received 12,935 votes (56.8%) in the 2015 runoff election to Jeff Arnold's 9,852 (43.2%). Carter authored or co-sponsored 75 bills that went on to become law. While also serving as chair of the Louisiana Senate Democratic Caucus, Carter chairs the Senate's Labor and Industrial Relations Committee.

Carter also chairs the Algiers Development District.

== U.S. House of Representatives ==
=== Elections ===
==== 2021 special ====
On November 18, 2020, U.S. Representative Cedric Richmond announced that he would resign from Louisiana's 2nd congressional district in January 2021 after having been selected by President-elect Joe Biden to be Senior Advisor to the President and the administration's director of the Office of Public Liaison. Carter then ran to fill the seat in Congress in the special election. On March 20, 2021, Carter finished first in the top-two primary and advanced, with runner-up Senator Karen Carter Peterson, to the runoff election held on April 24.

Carter was endorsed by Cedric Richmond, John Breaux, 8 congressional Democrats, Helena Moreno, Cleo Fields, Sharon Weston Broome, the AFL–CIO, the Louisiana Democratic Party, The Times-Picayune/The New Orleans Advocate, The Louisiana Weekly, and Gambit.

In the runoff, Carter received 48,511 votes (55.2%) to Peterson's 39,295 (44.8%).

=== Tenure ===
He was sworn in as the U.S. Representative for Louisiana's 2nd congressional district on May 11, 2021, increasing the Democratic Party's majority to 219–212 over the Republican Party in the United States House of Representatives. On August 12, 2022, he voted to pass the Inflation Reduction Act of 2022.

=== Committee assignments ===
For the 119th Congress:

- Committee on Energy and Commerce
  - Subcommittee on Communications and Technology
  - Subcommittee on Environment
  - Subcommittee on Health
- Committee on Homeland Security
  - Subcommittee on Oversight, Investigations, and Accountability
  - Subcommittee on Transportation and Maritime Security

=== Caucus memberships ===
- Congressional Equality Caucus
- Climate Solutions Caucus
- New Democrat Coalition
- Congressional Progressive Caucus
- Congressional Blockchain Caucus

== Political positions ==
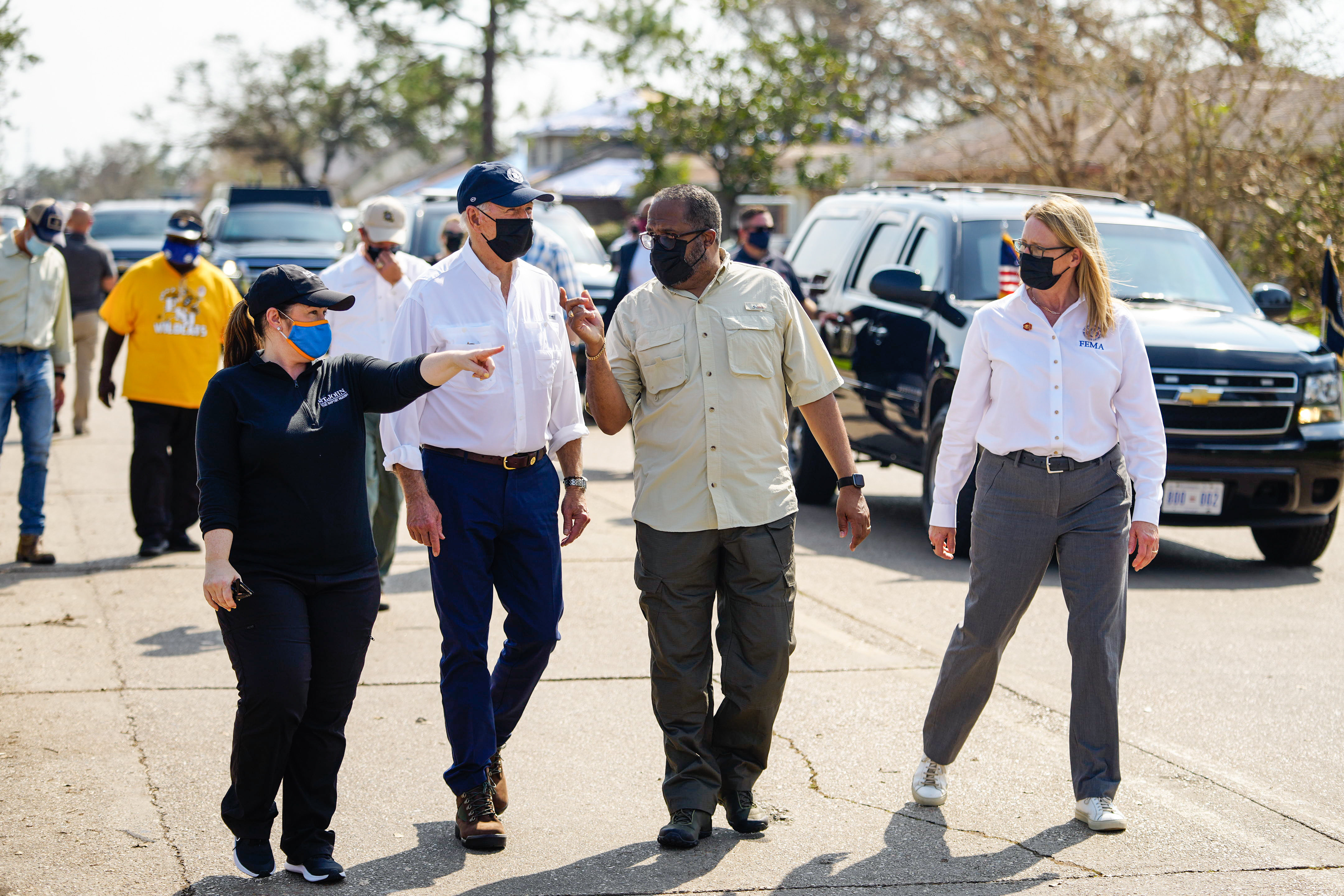
Carter with President Biden surveying damage from Hurricane Ida

Carter opposes conservative measures that have sought to restrict abortion and expand gun rights. During his term of office as a state senator, he had two priorities: raising the state's minimum wage and strengthening anti-discrimination laws against the LGBTQ+ community. He supports the infrastructure policy of the Biden administration.

Carter voted to provide Israel with support following 2023 Hamas attack on Israel. Carter also, however, voted for the Massie Amendment, to cut $3.3 billion in military funding to Israel, and criticized Israel's conduct during the war. Carter also criticized the interception of the 2025 Global Sumud Flotilla, and demanded the immediate release of all detained Americans.

Carter voted with President Joe Biden's stated position 100% of the time in the 117th Congress, according to a FiveThirtyEight analysis.

== Personal life ==
Carter's wife Andreé serves in the United States Army Reserve, and achieved the rank of Major General. Carter has two sons with his first wife, former New Orleans television news anchor Melanie Sanders. He lives on the Westbank of New Orleans, where he was born and raised.

Carter is a Baptist.

== See also ==
- List of African-American United States representatives

Louisiana State Senate
Preceded by Eric LaFleur	Minority Leader of the Louisiana Senate; 2016–2021	Succeeded by Gerald Boudreaux
U.S. House of Representatives
Preceded by Cedric Richmond	Member of the U.S. House of Representatives from Louisiana's 2nd congressional district 2021–present	Incumbent
U.S. order of precedence (ceremonial)
Preceded by Julia Letlow	United States representatives by seniority 281st	Succeeded by Melanie Stansbury
