= 2024 United States House of Representatives elections in Louisiana =

- November 5, 2024

All 6 Louisiana seats to the United States House of Representatives
	Majority party	Minority party
Party	Republican	Democratic
Seats before	5	1
Seats won	4	2
Seat change	▼1	▲1
Popular vote	1,248,101	650,836
Percentage	65.49%	34.15%
Swing	▼2.79%	▲6.00%

Republican hold
Democratic hold Democratic gain
Republican
50–60%
60–70%
70–80%
80–90%
90–100%
Democratic
50–60%
60–70%
70–80%
80–90%

The 2024 United States House of Representatives elections in Louisiana were held on November 5, 2024, to elect the six U.S. representatives from the state of Louisiana, one from each of the state's congressional districts. The elections coincided with the U.S. presidential election, as well as other elections to the House of Representatives, elections to the United States Senate, and various state and local elections.

== Overview ==
Popular vote
Republican	65.49%
Democratic	34.15%
Other	0.36%

House seats
Republican	66.67%
Democratic	33.33%

== Background ==
During the 2020 redistricting cycle, Louisiana's congressional map faced legal challenges for alleged violations of the Voting Rights Act of 1965. Roughly one-third of Louisiana's population is African American, but only one of Louisiana's six districts was drawn with a Black majority. Legislators overrode Governor John Bel Edwards' veto to enact the districts. The NAACP Legal Defense and Educational Fund sued the state on behalf of Black Louisianan voters. In Robinson v. Ardoin, a U.S. District Judge found that the maps were illegally racially gerrymandered, first ordering the legislature to reconvene to redraw compliant maps, then suggesting that she would enforce court-ordered maps following legislators' "disingenuous" and "insincere" attempts to do so on their own.

The State appealed the case to the Fifth Circuit Court of Appeals to attempt to keep the discriminatory map in place. The Fifth Circuit first placed a stay on the court-ordered redrawing process pending review, then reversed its decision. The State then appealed to the Supreme Court of the United States, which granted the state's application, stayed the district court's injunction, and allowed the 2022 elections to take place with the discriminatory district map in effect. The Court indicated that it would first review a similar case concerning racial gerrymandering in Alabama, Allen v. Milligan, before dealing with Robinson v. Ardoin.

The Court was widely expected to side with both Alabama and Louisiana, weakening the anti-discrimination protections of the Voting Rights Act. However, the Court upheld a lower court decision in Allen v. Milligan that Alabama's maps were in fact racially gerrymandered, suggesting that it may also decide against Louisiana. On June 26, 2023, the Court decided not to intervene in Robinson v. Ardoin, rescinding its stay and allowing the case to continue in the Fifth Circuit. On November 10, 2023, a decision made by the 5th circuit panel gave the Louisiana state legislature until January 15, 2024, to redraw its congressional maps, with a second majority Black district, in advance of the 2024 election cycle. Because newly elected Governor Jeff Landry was not sworn in until January 8, and a special session of the assembly could not have been convened until at least seven days after the governor calls for one, the Court extended the deadline for the legislature to approve new maps to January 30.

== District 1 ==
2024 Louisiana's 1st congressional district election
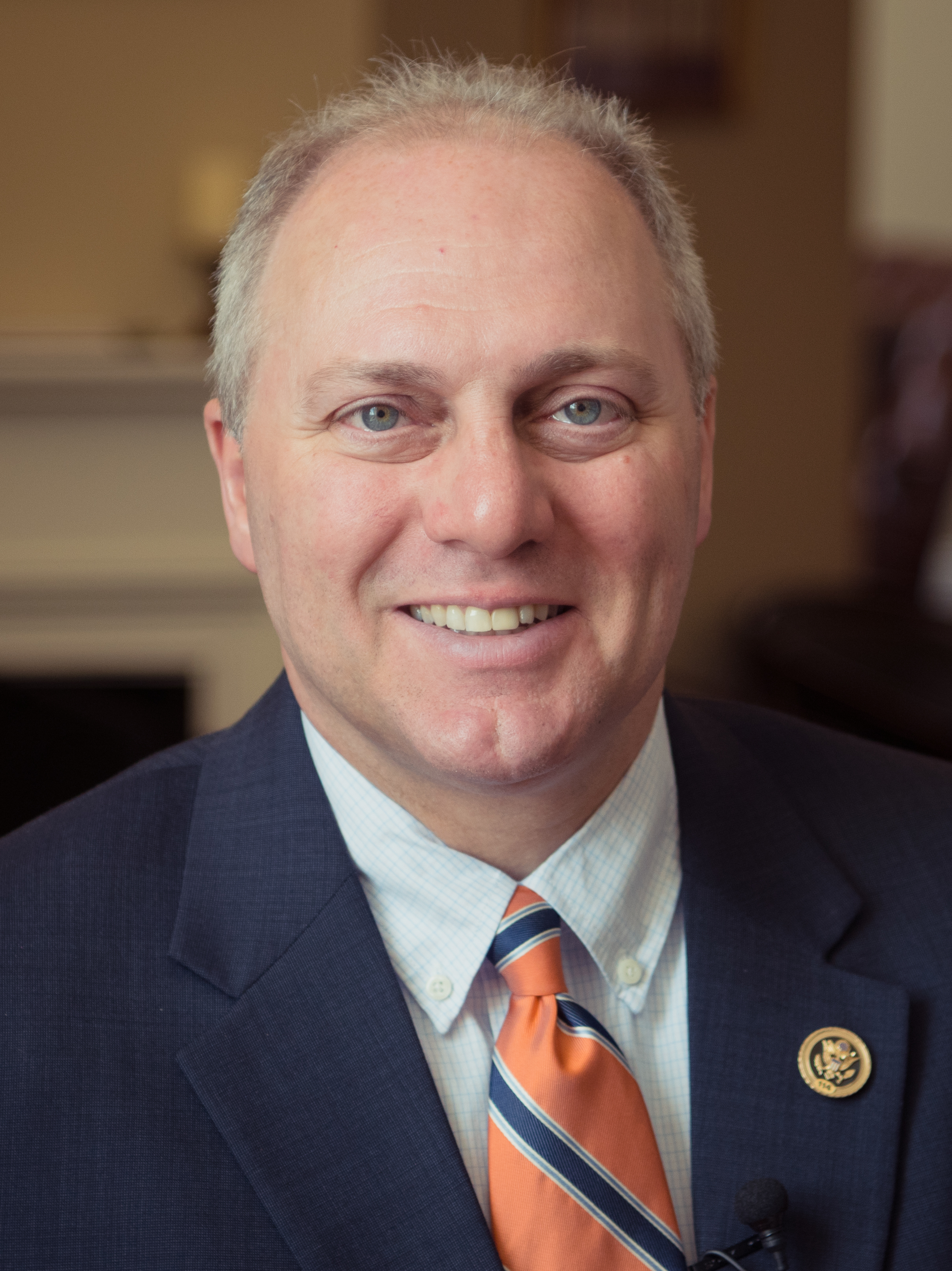

Candidate	Steve Scalise	Mel Manuel	Randall Arrington
Party	Republican	Democratic	Republican
Popular vote	238,842	85,911	17,856
Percentage	66.8%	24.0%	5.0%
- Scalise: 40–50% 50–60% 60–70% 70–80% 80–90% >90% Manuel: 40–50% 50–60% 60–70% 70–80% 80–90%
U.S. Representative before election
Steve Scalise
Republican
Elected U.S. Representative
Steve Scalise
Republican

The 1st district is based in the suburbs of New Orleans, spanning from the northern shore of Lake Pontchartrain south to the Mississippi River Delta. The incumbent was Republican Steve Scalise, who was re-elected with 72.8% of the vote in 2022.

=== Candidates ===
==== Declared ====
- Randall Arrington (Republican), retired political science professor
- Frankie Hyers (Independent), piano technician
- Mel Manuel (Democratic), operations director
- Steve Scalise (Republican), incumbent U.S. representative and House majority leader
- Ross Shales (Republican), insurance agent

=== Endorsements ===
Mel Manuel (D)

Organizations

- Freethought Equality Fund
Steve Scalise (R)

Organizations

- AIPAC
- Pro-Israel America

Political parties

- Republican Party of Louisiana

=== Fundraising ===
Campaign finance reports as of March 31, 2024
Candidate	Raised	Spent	Cash on hand
Steve Scalise (R)	$9,421,337	$9,988,273	$4,085,263
Mel Manuel (D)	$9,741	$4,588	$4,133
Source: Federal Election Commission

=== General election ===
==== Predictions ====
Source	Ranking	As of
Cook Political Report	Solid R	January 23, 2024
Inside Elections	Solid R	January 22, 2024
Sabato's Crystal Ball	Safe R	January 22, 2024
Elections Daily	Safe R	June 8, 2023
CNalysis	Solid R	January 23, 2024

=== Results ===
2024 Louisiana's 1st congressional district election
Party	Candidate	Votes	%
Republican	Steve Scalise (incumbent)	238,842	66.8
Democratic	Mel Manuel	85,911	24.0
Republican	Randall Arrington	17,856	5.0
Republican	Ross Shales	8,330	2.3
Independent	Frankie Hyers	6,781	1.9
Total votes		357,720	100.0
Republican hold			

== District 2 ==
2024 Louisiana's 2nd congressional district election
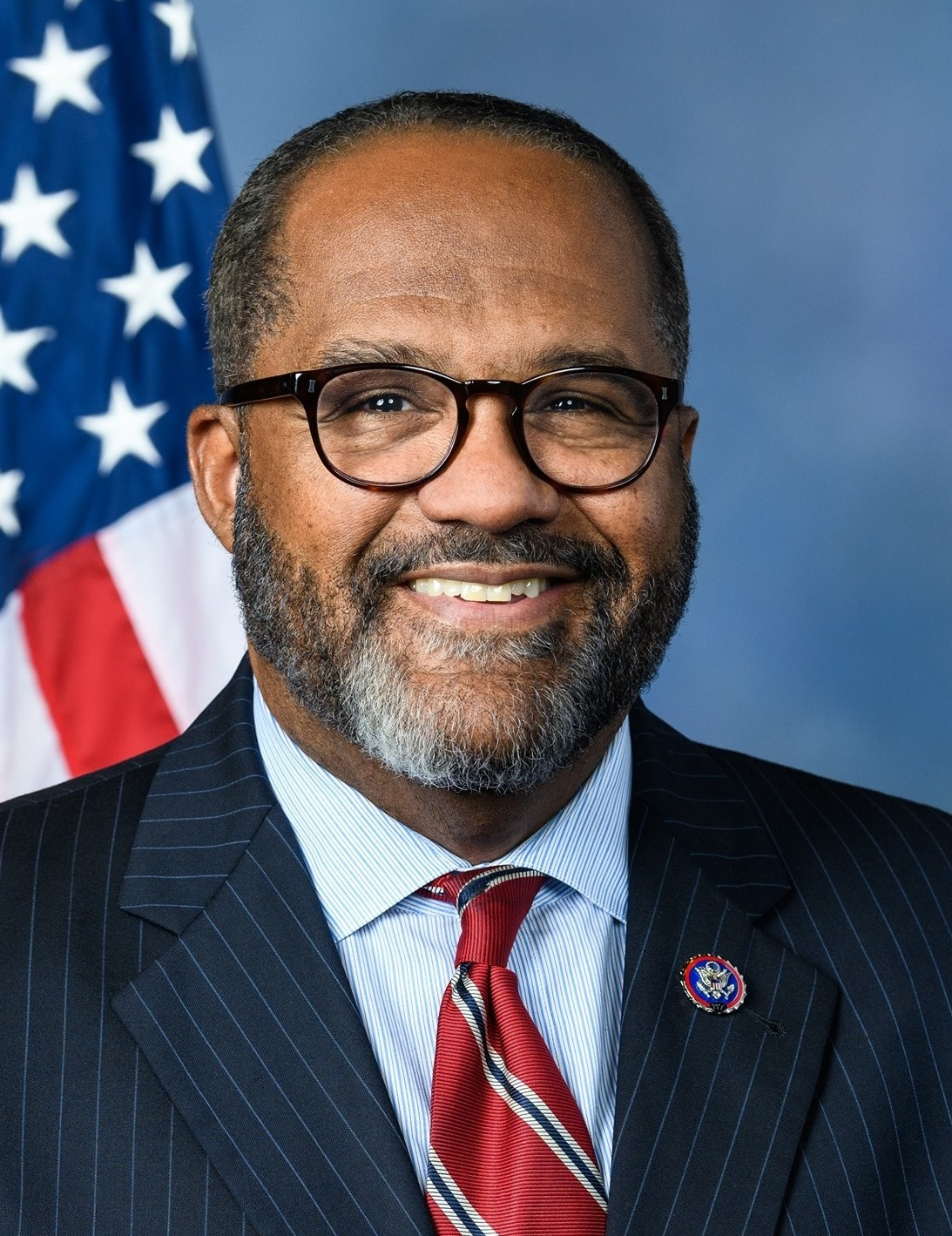

Candidate	Troy Carter	Christy Lynch
Party	Democratic	Republican
Popular vote	184,009	41,641
Percentage	60.3%	13.6%
Candidate	Devin Graham	Devin Davis
Party	Republican	Democratic
Popular vote	39,174	32,482
Percentage	12.8%	10.6%
- Carter: 30–40% 40–50% 50–60% 60–70% 70–80% 80–90% >90% Lynch: 30–40% 40–50% 50–60% >90% Graham: 30–40% 40–50% 50–60% Perrilloux: 60–70% Tie: 30–40% No votes
U.S. Representative before election
Troy Carter
Democratic
Elected U.S. Representative
Troy Carter
Democratic

The 2nd district stretches from New Orleans to inner Baton Rouge. The incumbent was Democrat Troy Carter, who was re-elected with 77.1% of the vote in 2022.

=== Candidates ===
==== Declared ====
- Troy Carter (Democratic), incumbent U.S. representative
- Devin Davis (Democratic), political organizer
- Devin Graham (Republican), real estate broker and perennial candidate
- Christy Lynch (Republican)
- Shorell Perrilloux (Republican), businesswoman

=== Fundraising ===
Campaign finance reports as of March 31, 2024
Candidate	Raised	Spent	Cash on hand
Troy Carter (D)	$848,486	$742,951	$471,722
Source: Federal Election Commission

=== General election ===
==== Predictions ====
Source	Ranking	As of
Cook Political Report	Solid D	January 23, 2024
Inside Elections	Solid D	January 22, 2024
Sabato's Crystal Ball	Safe D	January 22, 2024
Elections Daily	Safe D	June 8, 2023
CNalysis	Solid D	January 23, 2024

=== Results ===
2024 Louisiana's 2nd congressional district election
Party	Candidate	Votes	%
Democratic	Troy Carter (incumbent)	184,009	60.3
Republican	Christy Lynch	41,641	13.6
Republican	Devin Graham	39,174	12.8
Democratic	Devin Davis	32,482	10.6
Republican	Shorell Perrilloux	7,878	2.6
Total votes		305,184	100.0
Democratic hold			

== District 3 ==
2024 Louisiana's 3rd congressional district election
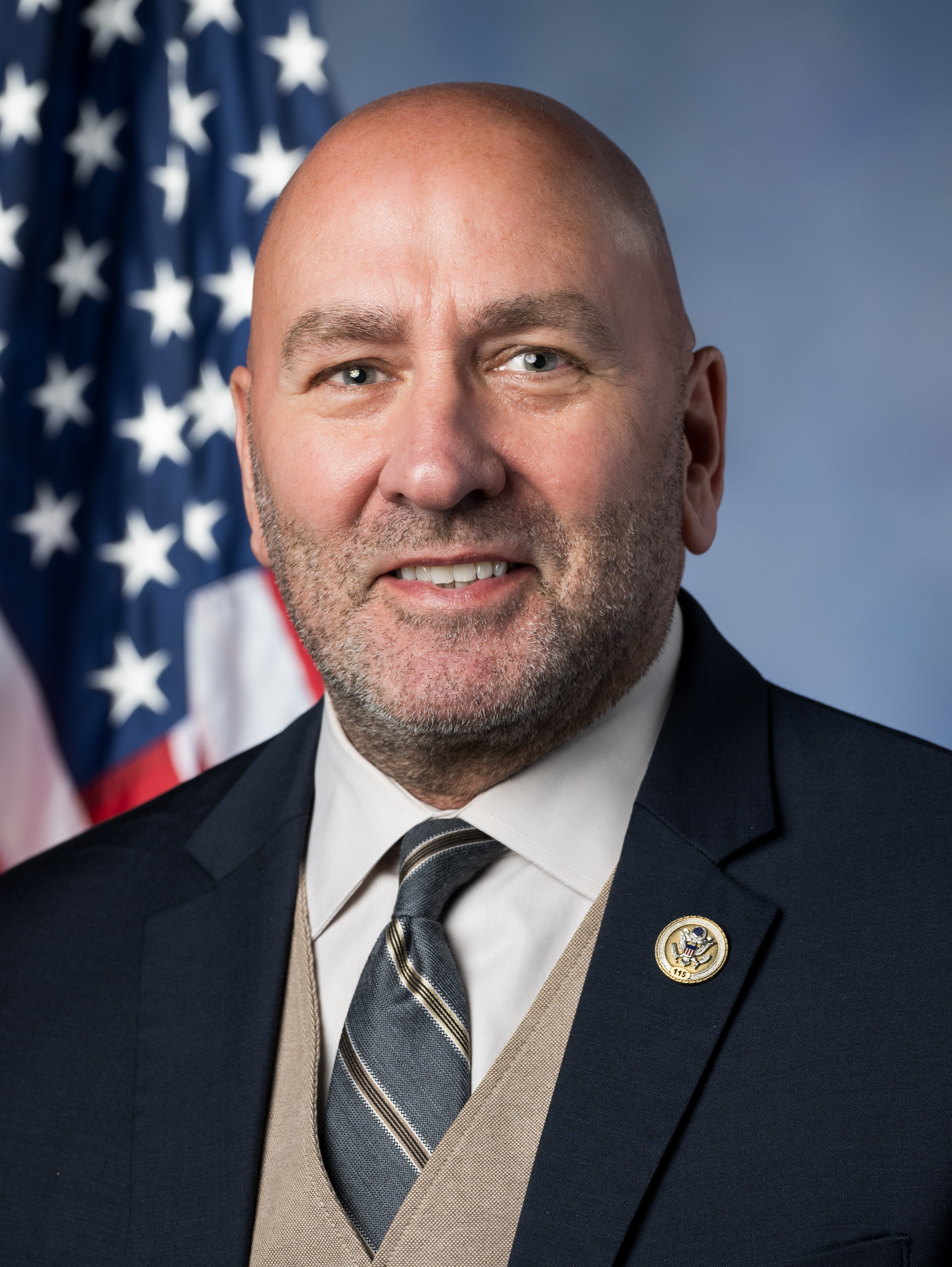

Candidate	Clay Higgins	Priscilla Gonzalez	Sadi Summerlin
Party	Republican	Democratic	Democratic
Popular vote	226,279	59,834	21,323
Percentage	70.6%	18.7%	6.7%
- Higgins: 30–40% 40–50% 50–60% 60–70% 70–80% 80–90% >90% Gonzalez: 30–40% 40–50% 50–60% 60–70% 70–80% 80–90% Tie: 30–40% No votes
U.S. Representative before election
Clay Higgins
Republican
Elected U.S. Representative
Clay Higgins
Republican

The 3rd district encompasses southwestern Louisiana, taking in Lake Charles and Lafayette. The incumbent was Republican Clay Higgins, who was re-elected with 64.3% of the vote in 2022.

=== Candidates ===
==== Declared ====
- Priscilla Gonzalez (Democratic), marketing director and candidate for mayor of Corpus Christi, Texas in 2020
- Clay Higgins (Republican), incumbent U.S. representative
- Xan John (Republican), businessman and perennial candidate
- Sadi Summerlin (Democratic), teacher

==== Declined ====
- Garret Graves (Republican), U.S. representative from the 6th district

=== Endorsements ===
Clay Higgins (R)

Executive branch officials

- Donald Trump, 45th president of the United States

Organizations

- AIPAC

Political parties

- Republican Party of Louisiana

=== Fundraising ===
Campaign finance reports as of March 31, 2024
Candidate	Raised	Spent	Cash on hand
Clay Higgins (R)	$446,953	$273,938	$200,532
Source: Federal Election Commission

=== General election ===
==== Predictions ====
Source	Ranking	As of
Cook Political Report	Solid R	January 23, 2024
Inside Elections	Solid R	January 22, 2024
Sabato's Crystal Ball	Safe R	January 22, 2024
Elections Daily	Safe R	June 8, 2023
CNalysis	Solid R	January 23, 2024

=== Results ===
2024 Louisiana's 3rd congressional district election
Party	Candidate	Votes	%
Republican	Clay Higgins (incumbent)	226,279	70.6
Democratic	Priscilla Gonzalez	59,834	18.7
Democratic	Sadi Summerlin	21,323	6.6
Republican	Xan John	13,246	4.1
Total votes		320,682	100.0
Republican hold			

== District 4 ==
2024 Louisiana's 4th congressional district
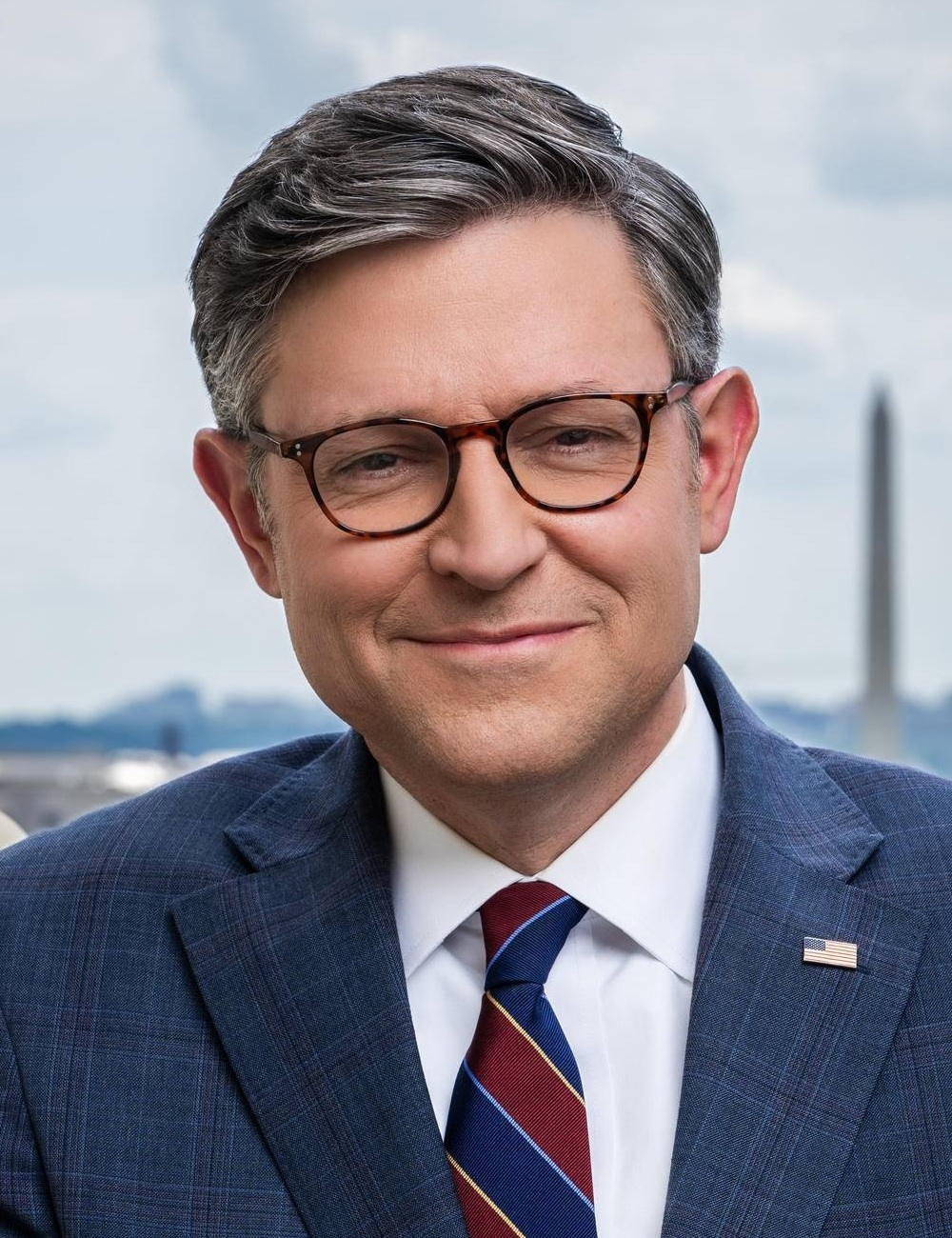

Candidate	Mike Johnson	Joshua Morott
Party	Republican	Republican
Popular vote	262,821	43,427
Percentage	85.8%	14.2%
- Johnson: 50–60% 60–70% 70–80% 80–90% >90% Morott: 50–60% 60–70% 70–80% Tie: 50% No votes
U.S. Representative before election
Mike Johnson
Republican
Elected U.S. Representative
Mike Johnson
Republican

The 4th district encompasses northwestern Louisiana, taking in the Shreveport–Bossier City metropolitan area. The incumbent was Republican and current Speaker of the House Mike Johnson, who ran unopposed in 2022.

=== Candidates ===
==== Declared ====
- Mike Johnson (Republican), incumbent U.S. representative and Speaker of the House
- Joshua Morott (Republican), substitute teacher

=== Endorsements ===
Mike Johnson (R)

Organizations

- AIPAC
- Pro-Israel America

Political parties

- Republican Party of Louisiana

=== Fundraising ===
Campaign finance reports as of March 31, 2024
Candidate	Raised	Spent	Cash on hand
Mike Johnson (R)	$8,984,766	$5,473,098	$4,396,247
Source: Federal Election Commission

=== General election ===
==== Predictions ====
Source	Ranking	As of
Cook Political Report	Solid R	January 23, 2024
Inside Elections	Solid R	January 22, 2024
Sabato's Crystal Ball	Safe R	January 22, 2024
Elections Daily	Safe R	June 8, 2023
CNalysis	Solid R	January 23, 2024

=== Results ===
2024 Louisiana's 4th congressional district election
Party	Candidate	Votes	%
Republican	Mike Johnson (incumbent)	262,821	85.8
Republican	Joshua Morott	43,427	14.2
Total votes		306,248	100.0
Republican hold			

== District 5 ==
2024 Louisiana's 5th congressional district election
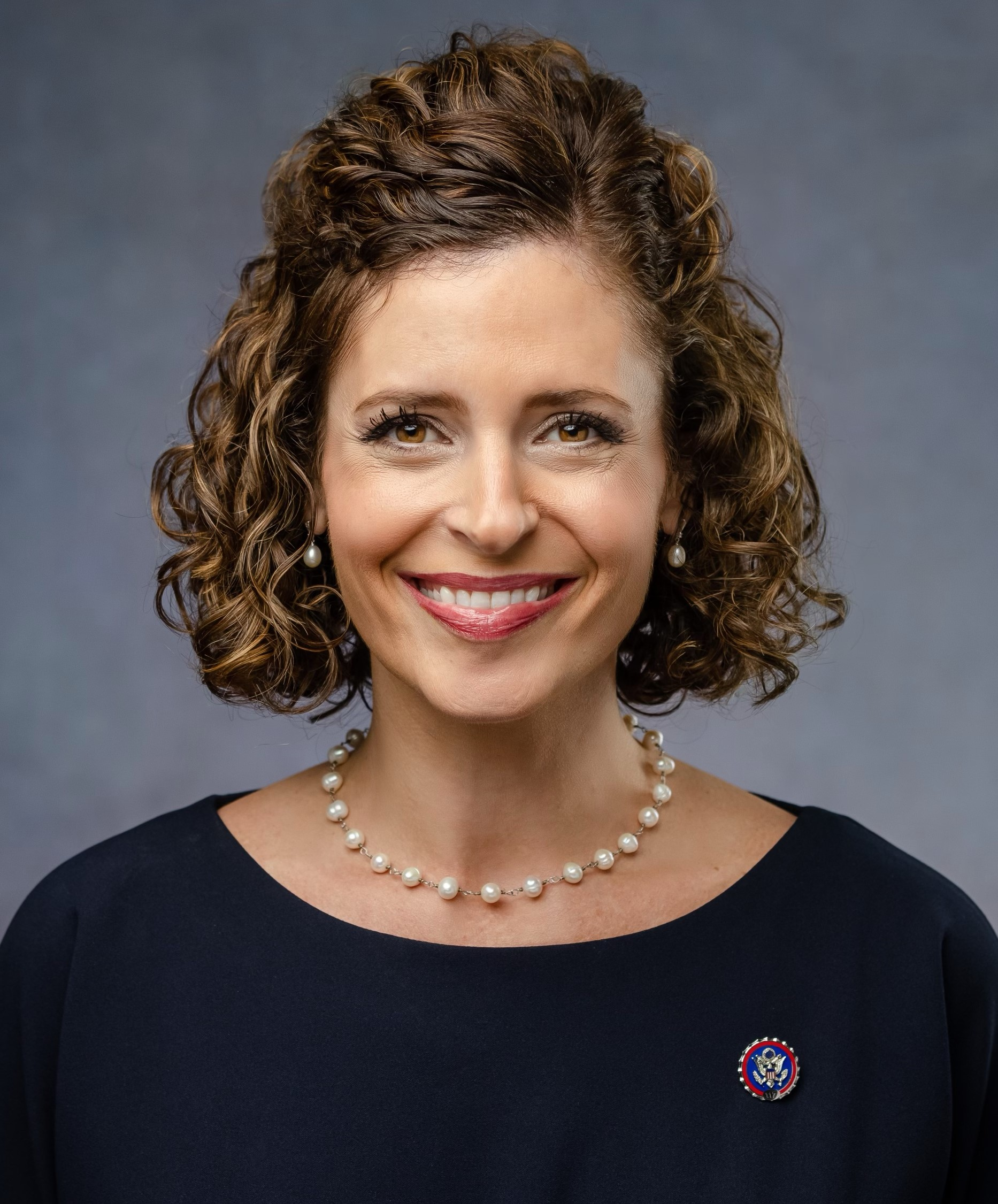

Candidate	Julia Letlow	Michael Vallien Jr.	Vinny Mendoza
Party	Republican	Democratic	Republican
Popular vote	201,037	82,981	35,833
Percentage	62.9%	25.9%	11.2%
- Letlow: 40–50% 50–60% 60–70% 70–80% 80–90% >90% Vallien: 40–50% 50–60% 60–70% 70–80% 80–90% Tie: 40–50% 50% No votes
U.S. Representative before election
Julia Letlow
Republican
Elected U.S. Representative
Julia Letlow
Republican

The 5th district encompasses rural northeastern Louisiana, central Louisiana, as well as the northern part of Louisiana's Florida parishes in southeast Louisiana, taking in Monroe, Alexandria, Opelousas, Amite and Bogalusa, Louisiana. The incumbent was Republican Julia Letlow, who was re-elected with 67.6% of the vote in 2022.

=== Candidates ===
==== Declared ====
- Julia Letlow (Republican), incumbent U.S. representative
- Vinny Mendoza (Republican), farmer and perennial candidate
- Michael Vallien Jr. (Democratic), realtor

==== Withdrawn ====
- Rivule Sykes (Green), Uber driver

==== Declined ====
- Garret Graves (Republican), U.S. representative from the 6th district

=== Endorsements ===
Julia Letlow (R)

Executive branch officials

- Donald Trump, 45th president of the United States

U.S. representatives

- Mike Johnson, U.S. representative from Louisiana's 4th congressional district and speaker of the House
- Steve Scalise, U.S. representative from Louisiana's 1st congressional district

Statewide officials

- Jeff Landry, governor of Louisiana

Organizations

- AIPAC
- Maggie's List

Political parties

- Republican Party of Louisiana

=== Polling ===
Hypothetical polling

Poll source	Date(s) administered	Sample size (Note: Key: A – all adults RV – registered voters LV – likely voters V – unclear)	Margin of error	Garret Graves (R)	Julia Letlow (R)	Rivule Sykes (G)	Other	Undecided
Victory Insights (R)	May 24–26, 2024	375 (LV)	± 5.2%	35%	38%	6%	2% (Note: Dany Kitishian (R) with 2%)	19%

=== Fundraising ===
Campaign finance reports as of March 31, 2024
Candidate	Raised	Spent	Cash on hand
Julia Letlow (R)	$1,514,096	$694,447	$1,606,349
Source: Federal Election Commission

=== General election ===
==== Predictions ====
Source	Ranking	As of
Cook Political Report	Solid R	January 23, 2024
Inside Elections	Solid R	January 22, 2024
Sabato's Crystal Ball	Safe R	January 22, 2024
Elections Daily	Safe R	June 8, 2023
CNalysis	Solid R	January 23, 2024

=== Results ===
2024 Louisiana's 5th congressional district election
Party	Candidate	Votes	%
Republican	Julia Letlow (incumbent)	201,037	62.9
Democratic	Michael Vallien Jr.	82,981	25.9
Republican	Vinny Mendoza	35,833	11.2
Total votes		319,851	100.0
Republican hold			

== District 6 ==
2024 Louisiana's 6th congressional district election
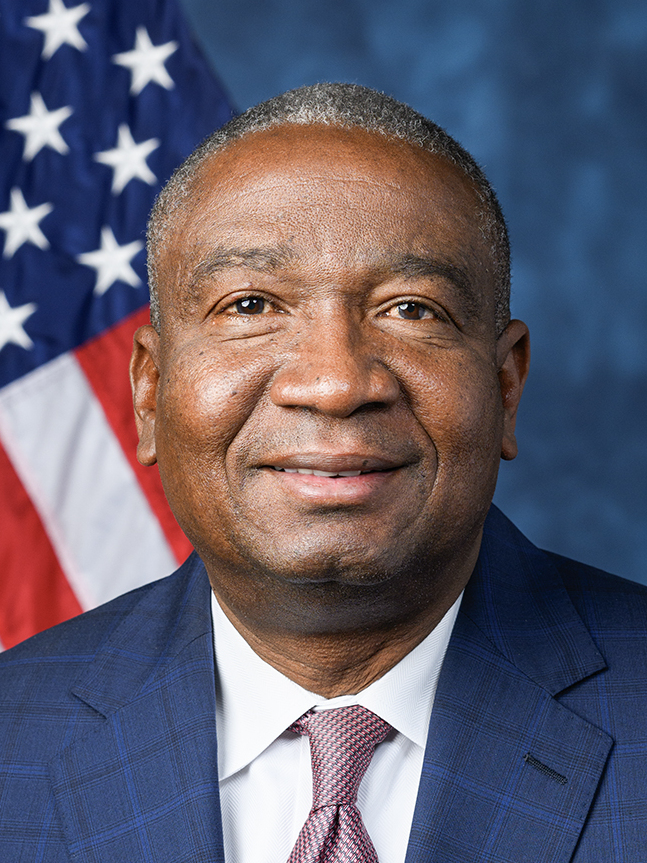

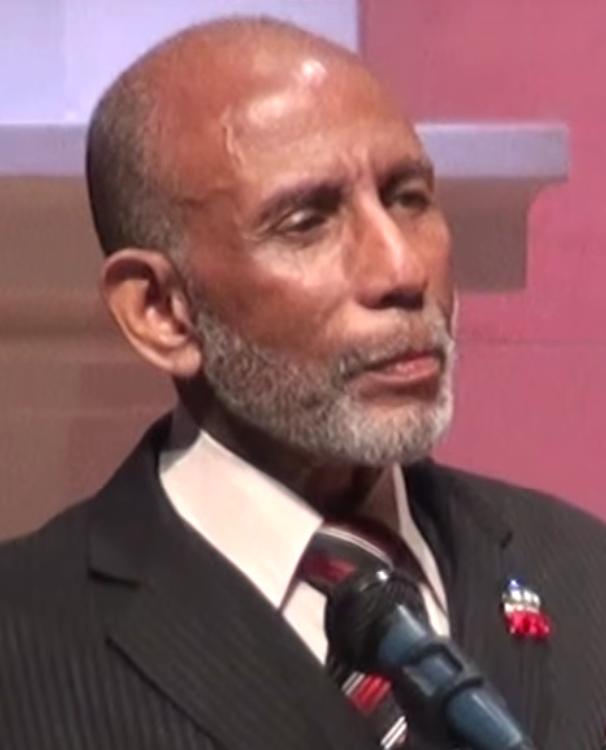

Candidate	Cleo Fields	Elbert Guillory	Quentin Anderson
Party	Democratic	Republican	Democratic
Popular vote	150,323	111,737	23,811
Percentage	50.8%	37.7%	8.0%
- Fields: 40–50% 50–60% 60–70% 70–80% 80–90% >90% Guillory: 40–50% 50–60% 60–70% 70–80% 80–90% >90% Anderson: 30–40% Tie: 40–50%
U.S. Representative before election
Garret Graves
Republican
Elected U.S. Representative
Cleo Fields
Democratic

The 6th district has been reformed after the decision of Allen v. Milligan into the second majority Black district, giving it a stronger lean to the Democratic Party. It encompasses much of Baton Rouge, Shreveport, and Lafayette. The incumbent, Republican Garret Graves, originally ran for re-election, but on June 14, 2024, he withdrew, as the modified seat was upheld by the Supreme Court for this election cycle. He was re-elected with 80.4% of the vote in 2022.

=== Candidates ===
==== Declared ====
- Quentin Anderson (Democratic), nonprofit executive
- Cleo Fields (Democratic), state senator from the 14th district (2020–present), (Note: Also 1988–1993 and 1997–2008) former U.S. representative from the 4th district (1993–1997), and runner-up for governor in 1995
- Elbert Guillory (Republican), former state senator from the 24th district (2009–2016), candidate for lieutenant governor in 2015 and 2023, and candidate for the 4th district in 2016
- Wilken Jones Jr. (Democratic), museum owner
- Peter Williams (Democratic), tree farmer and candidate for this district in 2014

==== Withdrawn ====
- Garret Graves (Republican), incumbent U.S. representative

==== Declined ====
- Sharon Weston Broome (Democratic), mayor-president of Baton Rouge (2017–present) (ran for re-election)
- Jeff Hall (Democratic), former mayor of Alexandria (2018–2022) and former state representative from the 26th district (2015–2018)
- Ted James (Democratic), former regional administrator for the U.S. Small Business Administration (2022–2024) and former state representative from the 101st district (2011–2022) (ran for mayor of Baton Rouge)
- Sam Jenkins (Democratic), state senator from the 39th district (2024–present)
- Gregory Tarver (Democratic), former state senator from the 39th district (1984–2004, 2012–2024) and runner-up for mayor of Shreveport in 2022

=== Endorsements ===
Quentin Anderson (D)

Organizations

- National Organization for Women PAC
Cleo Fields (D)

Statewide officials

- John Bel Edwards, governor of Louisiana (2016–2024)
Elbert Guillory (R)

Political parties

- Louisiana Republican Party (previously endorsed Graves)
Garret Graves (R) (declined)

U.S. representatives

- Mike Johnson, U.S. representative from Louisiana's 4th congressional district and Speaker of the House

Organizations

- AIPAC

Political parties

- Louisiana Republican Party

=== Polling ===
Hypothetical polling

Poll source	Date(s) administered	Sample size	Margin of error	Gerald Boudreaux (D)	Cleo Fields (D)	Garret Graves (R)	Elbert Guillory (R)	Undecided
BDPC	May 30-June 1, 2024	500 (RV)	–	7%	38%	19%	8%	26%

=== Fundraising ===
Campaign finance reports as of March 31, 2024
Candidate	Raised	Spent	Cash on hand
Cleo Fields (D)	$601,637	$5,477	$596,161
Source: Federal Election Commission

=== General election ===
==== Predictions ====
Source	Ranking	As of
Cook Political Report	Solid D (flip)	January 23, 2024
Inside Elections	Likely D (flip)	January 22, 2024
Sabato's Crystal Ball	Safe D (flip)	January 22, 2024
Elections Daily	Safe D (flip)	January 23, 2024
CNalysis	Solid D (flip)	January 23, 2024

=== Results ===
2024 Louisiana's 6th congressional district election
Party	Candidate	Votes	%
Democratic	Cleo Fields	150,323	50.8
Republican	Elbert Guillory	111,737	37.7
Democratic	Quentin Anderson	23,811	8.0
Democratic	Peter Williams	6,252	2.1
Democratic	Wilken Jones Jr.	3,910	1.3
Total votes		296,033	100.0
Democratic gain from Republican			
