= 2004 Baton Rouge mayoral election =

- September 18, 2004 (first round); November 2, 2004 (runoff)
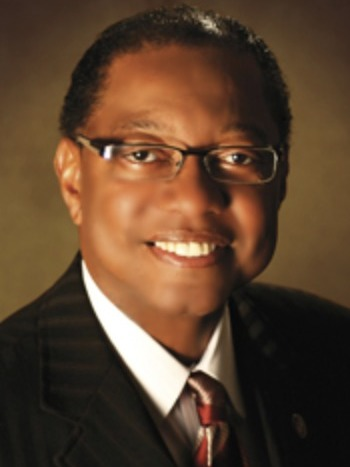

Candidate	Kip Holden	Bobby Ray Simpson	William Daniel
Party	Democratic	Republican	Democratic
First round	39,470; 35.05%	38,206; 33.93%	27,662; 24.57%
Runoff	94,802; 53.88%	81,142; 46.12%	Eliminated
Mayor before election
Bobby Ray Simpson
Republican
Elected mayor
Kip Holden
Democratic

The 2004 Baton Rouge mayoral election was held on September 18 and November 2, 2004, to elect the mayor-president of Baton Rouge, Louisiana. It saw Democrat Kip Holden unseat Incumbent Republican Mayor Bobby Ray Simpson.

== Results ==
=== First round ===
First round
Party	Candidate	Votes	%
Democratic	Melvin L. "Kip" Holden	39,470	35
Republican	Bobby Simpson (incumbent)	38,206	34
Democratic	William Daniel	27,662	25
Republican	"Nat" Bankston	4,892	4
Republican	John B. Fontenot	900	1
Democratic	Leroy Davis	765	1
Other	Stephanie J. Greco	703	1
Total votes		112,598	

=== Runoff ===
Runoff results
Party	Candidate	Votes	%
Democratic	Melvin L. "Kip" Holden	94,802	54
Republican	Bobby Simpson (incumbent)	81,142	46
Total votes		175,944	
