= Loyeau Berhel =

Mayor of Baton Rouge
- In office 1871–1871
- Preceded by: James Essex Elam
- Succeeded by: James Essex Elam

Personal details
- Born: ca. 1810 Baton Rouge, Louisiana, U.S.
- Died: ca. 1901
- Party: Republican
- Spouse: Coralie Berhel

Loyeau Berhel was a Reconstruction-era politician who served as the first African American and first Republican mayor of Baton Rouge, Louisiana.

== Early life ==
Berhel was born in Baton Rouge in approximately 1810. He was a free person of color and considered a "mulatto" for contemporary demographic purposes. A bricklayer by trade, he married Coralie Berhel and had at least seven children.

In 1856, Berhel was charged with assault and battery and sentenced to thirty days in the parish prison and assessed court costs.

Berhel acquired numerous properties within the Baton Rouge area. During the Battle of Baton Rouge in the American Civil War, Union troops burned houses between the garrison and downtown to limit available cover for counterattacking Confederates. Berhel lost more houses to the fire (six, valued at $10,000 total) than anyone else. None of the arson victims received any kind of compensation after the war for their troubles.

In 1867, Berhel had the honor of being elected to the position of sergeant-at-arms for the Louisiana constitutional convention.

== 1871 mayoral bid ==
In 1871, Berhel sought to challenge the Democratic incumbent mayor, James Essex Elam. The election returns showed Berhel receiving 536 ballots to Elam's 521 and L. C. Morris' 1.

Democrats initially appeared to be accepting of Berhel's victory. The mostly-Democrat commissioners of election certified the results without issue, and even the pro-Democrat Baton Rouge newspaper called the Journal offered a post-mortem analysis of the results that was somewhat conciliatory in tone, complimentary toward Berhel and the election process in general. Berhel was formally issued a commission to assume office by Gov. Henry C. Warmoth, also a Republican but acting from the temporary capital in New Orleans.

However, with the election decided by only 15 votes, it may have been inevitable that a Democratic-controlled electoral investigative committee would be created. The committee eventually reported that it was able to find fault with eight votes, exactly enough to reverse the election totals to a mere one-vote win for Elam. This made it the second-closest mayoral election in Baton Rouge history (the 1856 election had ended in a tie). Eventually, the majority-Democrat Board of Selectmen would publicly announce that they would accept the investigative committee's findings, alter the election results of record, and consider Elam as the mayor going forward. With few Republican officials holding any positions of influence that could directly help Berhel, his mayoral win had now effectively been tossed aside by the Democrats. Warmoth himself was still attempting to balance the state's difficult post-war peace and opted to not use any kind of force to prop up Berhel's administration. A committee formed in subsequent weeks by local African American Republican politician J. Henri Burch continued to keep Berhel's claim to the office in the news, in hopes that acting governor Lt. Gov. Oscar J. Dunn, also a black Republican, might more actively support Berhel. However, Dunn too declined to get involved as well.

Following the next mayor's election, in 1872, a similar controversy erupted between the incumbent Elam and his Republican challenger Henry Schorten, but by then the Republicans had apparently built up a stronger local party organization and were able to hold on to a share of the mayor's office even after the investigation for voting irregularities.

== Personal life ==
Berhel later served as a trustee for the Louisiana Institution for the Education of the Deaf and Dumb.

Late in his life, multiple properties of his were dispersed through tax sales. A Baton Rouge newspaper reported in November 1901 that Berhel was "nearing the end of his earthly career" and possibly as old as 96 at that point (though this age figure conflicts with past census numbers that would have put his age closer to being around 91 or even 86).

His surname is sometimes incorrectly rendered as "Brahil" or "Brahill."

== Legacy ==
Berhel's six-week tenure in 1871 would mark the last time that an African American would hold the mayor's seat until 2005, when Kip Holden took office for the first of his three consecutive terms (another African American, Sharon Weston Broome, was elected right after Holden and served between 2017 and 2024).

Berhel's brief term also blazed a trail for future Republican candidates for office in the area. When the next Republican contender for the municipality's mayoral seat faced a scenario similar to that which Berhel had, the party was better prepared to stay and fight for the position. Further more, Berhel's own two sons, Felix Berhel and J. Oscar Berhel, followed in their father’s footsteps and were active in Republican politics in subsequent decades.

== See also ==
- List of first African-American mayors
