= James Elam =

James or Jim Elam may refer to:

- James M. Elam (1796–1856), American soldier and politician
- James Essex Elam (1829–1873), American politician, mayor of Baton Rouge
- James Elam (American football) (fl. 1920s–1930s), American football coach
- James Elam (physician) (1918–1995), American physician
- Jim Elam (1920–1961), American baseball player
