= Louisiana's 101st House of Representatives district =

American legislative district

Louisiana's 101st State House of Representatives district
Representative
Vanessa Caston LaFleur; D–Baton Rouge

Louisiana's 101st House of Representatives district is one of 105 Louisiana House of Representatives districts. It is currently held by Democrat Vanessa Caston LaFleur.

== Geography ==
HD101 includes a portion of the city of Baton Rouge, the census-designated place of Montichello and Merrydale.

== Election results ==
Year	Winning candidate	Party	Percent	Opponent	Party	Percent	Opponent	Party	Percent
2011	Edward James	Democratic	58.1%	Tiffany Foxworth	Democratic	41.9%			
2015	Edward James	Democratic	Cancelled						
2019	Edward James	Democratic	Cancelled						
2022 (special)	Vanessa Caston LaFleur	Democratic	61.5%	Dawn Chanet Collins	Democratic	28.9%	Terry Hebert	Independent	9.7%
2023	Vanessa Caston LaFleur	Democratic	Cancelled						
