= 2000 Baton Rouge mayoral election =

- October 7, 2000 (first round); November 7, 2000 (runoff)

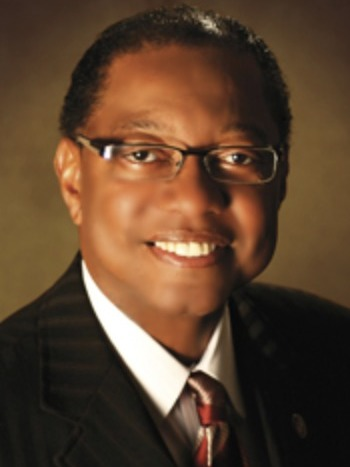

Candidate	Bobby Ray Simpson	Kip Holden	Rolfe H. McCollister, Jr.
Party	Republican	Democratic	Republican
First round	27,928; 25.07%	34,780; 31.22%	21,820; 19.59%
Runoff	93,952; 56.93%	71,087; 43.07%	Eliminated
Candidate	Donna M. Mayeux	Roxson Welch	Fred C. Dent, Jr.
Party	Democratic	Republican	Republican
First round	12,680; 11.38%	7,847; 7.04%	6,339; 5.69%
Runoff	Eliminated	Eliminated	Eliminated
Mayor before election
Thomas Edward "Tom Ed" McHugh
Republican
Elected mayor
Bobby Ray Simpson
Republican

The 2000 Baton Rouge mayoral election was held on October 7 and November 7, 2000, to elect the mayor-president of Baton Rouge, Louisiana. It saw the election of Bobby Ray Simpson. This was the last time a Republican was elected mayor-president until 2024.

== Results ==
=== First round ===
First round
Party	Candidate	Votes	%
Democratic	Melvin L. "Kip" Holden	34,780	31
Republican	Bobby R. Simpson	27,928	25
Republican	Rolfe H. McCollister, Jr.	21,820	20
Democratic	Donna M. Mayeux	12,680	11
Republican	Roxson Welch	7,847	7
Republican	Fred C. Dent, Jr.	6,339	6
Total votes		111,394	

=== Runoff ===
Runoff results
Party	Candidate	Votes	%
Republican	Bobby R. Simpson	93,952	57
Democratic	Melvin L. "Kip" Holden	71,087	43
Total votes		165,039	
