= 1996 Baton Rouge mayoral election =

- September 21, 1996

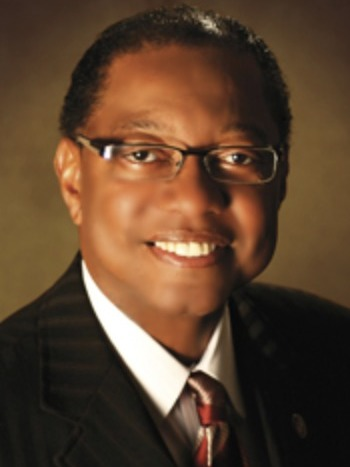
Candidate	Tom Ed McHugh	Kip Holden
Party	Republican	Democratic
Popular vote	75,413	38,641
Percentage	66.12%	33.88%
Mayor before election
Tom Ed McHugh
Republican
Elected mayor
Tom Ed McHugh
Republican

The 1996 Baton Rouge mayoral election was held on September 21, 1996, to elect the mayor-president of Baton Rouge, Louisiana. It saw the reelection of incumbent Thomas Edward "Tom Ed" McHugh.

== Results ==
Results
Party	Candidate	Votes	%
Republican	Tom Ed McHugh (incumbent)	75,413	66.12
Democratic	Kip Holden	38,641	33.88
Other	Luther "Doc" Stewart withdrawn	0	0
Total votes		114,054	
