= 2024 Baton Rouge mayoral election =

- November 5, 2024 (first round); December 7, 2024 (runoff)
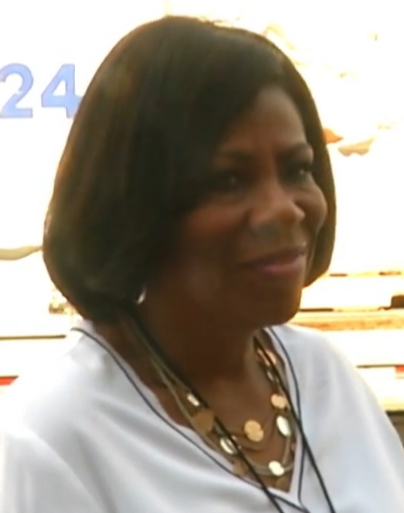

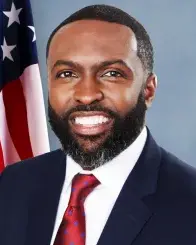
Candidate	Sid Edwards	Sharon Weston Broome	Ted James
Party	Republican	Democratic	Democratic
First round	64,862; 34.38%	58,843; 31.19%	53,510; 28.37%
Runoff	57,308; 54.12%	48,587; 45.88%	Eliminated
- Results by precinct Edwards: 50–60% 60–70% 70–80% 80–90% >90% Broome: 50–60% 60–70% 70–80% 80–90% >90%
Mayor before election
Sharon Weston Broome
Democratic
Elected mayor
Sid Edwards
Republican

The 2024 Baton Rouge mayoral election was held on November 5, 2024, with a runoff for December 7 to elect the mayor-president of Baton Rouge, Louisiana. With no candidate receiving a majority of votes in the initial round of the election, a runoff election was held on December 7. Incumbent Democratic Mayor Sharon Weston Broome was seeking re-election to a third term and placed second in the first round behind Republican Sid Edwards. Edwards defeated the incumbent Mayor Broome in the runoff election, becoming the first Republican elected mayor-president since 2000.

== Candidates ==
=== Advanced to runoff ===
- Sharon Weston Broome (Democratic), incumbent mayor
- Sid Edwards (Republican), Istrouma High School head football coach

=== Eliminated in primary ===
- Ryan Carter (Independent), IT worker
- Nathaniel Hearn (Republican), actor
- Ted James (Democratic), former regional administrator for the U.S. Small Business Administration (2022–2024) and former state representative from the 101st district (2011–2022)
- Steve Myers (Republican), perennial candidate
- Champagne Roundtree (Independent), property manager

=== Withdrawn ===
- Tammy Cook (Republican), realtor (remained on ballot)

== Results ==
2024 Baton Rouge mayoral election 1st round
Party	Candidate	Votes	%
Republican	Sid Edwards	64,862	34.38%
Democratic	Sharon Weston Broome (incumbent)	58,843	31.19%
Democratic	Ted James	53,510	28.37%
Republican	Steve Myers	4,541	2.41%
Republican	Tammy Cook (withdrawn)	2,587	1.37%
Republican	Nathaniel Hearn	2,120	1.12%
Independent	Ryan Carter	1,527	0.81%
Independent	Champagne Roundtree	656	0.35%
Total votes		188,646	100.00%

== Runoff results ==
2024 Baton Rouge mayoral election runoff
Party	Candidate	Votes	%
Republican	Sid Edwards	57,308	54.12%
Democratic	Sharon Weston Broome (incumbent)	48,587	45.88%
Total votes		105,895	100.00%
