= Senator Broome =

Senator Broome may refer to:

- John Broome (politician) (1738–1810), New York State Senate
- Sharon Weston Broome (born 1956), Louisiana State Senate
