= Jastremski =

Jastremski is a Polish masculine surname. Its feminine counterpart is Jastremska. It may refer to

- Chet Jastremski (1941–2014), American swimmer
- John Jastremski, American football equipment manager, part of the Deflategate#Wells_Report controversy
- Leon Jastremski (1843–1907), Polish-American soldier and journalist
