= 2020 Baton Rouge mayoral election =

- November 3, 2020 (first round); December 5, 2020 (runoff)
- Turnout: 70.2% (R1); 34.4% (R2)
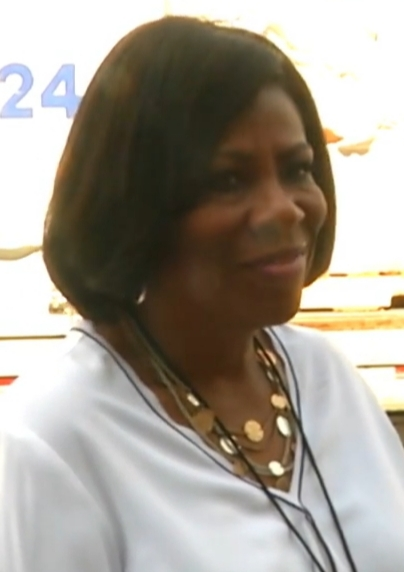

Candidate	Sharon Weston Broome	Steve Carter	Matthew Watson
Party	Democratic	Republican	Republican
First round	98,722; 48.13%	40,757; 19.87%	27,062; 13.19%
Runoff	65,495; 56.54%	50,353; 43.46%	Eliminated
Candidate	Jordan Piazza	C. Denise Marcelle
Party	Republican	Democratic
First round	20,012; 9.76%	14,603; 7.12%
Runoff	Eliminated	Eliminated
- Results by precinct Broome: 50–60% 60–70% 70–80% 80–90% >90; Carter: 50–60% 60–70% 70–80% 80–90% >90%
Mayor before election
Sharon Weston Broome
Democratic
Elected mayor
Sharon Weston Broome
Democratic

The 2020 Baton Rouge mayoral election was held on November 3, 2020, and December 5, 2020, to elect the mayor-president of Baton Rouge, Louisiana.

As no candidate won a majority in the first round, a runoff was held between the top two candidates, incumbent Mayor-President Sharon Weston Broome of the Democratic Party and fmr. State Representative Steve Carter of the Republican Party. Despite initially tight polls in the runoff, which showed Carter within reach of winning the election, Broome won by a decisive margin.

Held in the midst of the COVID-19 pandemic, campaigning was limited to smaller private events, limiting both candidates' exposure and public attention on the race. Major issues of the race were: crime, economic development, pandemic recovery, infrastructure, and education. Due to consistently lack-luster public support of incumbent Mayor-President Broome, the race drew seven total candidates, the most a mayoral incumbent in East Baton Rouge Parish had faced in nearly 30 years.

Following the race's conclusion, runner-up Steve Carter contracted COVID-19, dying two months later from COVID-19 related complications on January 26, 2021. Carter's death was followed by an outpouring of fond emotion, including from his electoral opponent Broome, who stated, "You never saw him without a smile on his face and a hand extended to greet you, Steve was a Baton Rougean through and through. I am tremendously sad to have lost yet another friend and neighbor to COVID-19. Our thoughts and prayers are with Steve's family and his many friends as we mourn his great loss."

== Declared ==
- Sharon Weston Broome, incumbent Mayor-President (party preference: Democratic)
- Steve Carter, former State Representative (party preference: Republican)
- E. Eric Guirard, attorney (party preference: Independent)
- C. Denise Marcelle, State Representative (party preference: Democratic)
- Jordan Piazza, owner of Uncle Earl's Bar & Phil's Oyster Bar (party preference: Republican)
- Frank Smith III, property manager (party preference: Republican)
- Matthew Watson, East Baton Rouge Metro Councilman (party preference: Republican)

== Disqualified ==
- Tara Wicker, Baton Rouge Metro Councilwoman (party preference: Democratic)

== Polling ==
Poll source	Date	Sample size (Note: Key: A – all adults RV – registered voters LV – likely voters V – unclear)	Margin of error	Sharon Weston Broome (D)	Steve Carter (R)	C. Denise Marcelle (D)	Matthew Watson (R)	Other	Undecided
Baton Rouge Area Chamber	Released October 14, 2020	– (V) (Note: Not yet released)	–	41%	14%	6%	13%	6% (Note: Jordan Piazza (R) with 4%; "E Eric" Guirard (I) with 2%; Frank Smith (R) with 0%)	19%

== Results ==
2020 Baton Rouge mayoral election 1st round
Party	Candidate	Votes	%
Democratic	Sharon Weston Broome (incumbent)	98,722	48.13%
Republican	Steve Carter	40,757	19.87%
Republican	Matthew Watson	27,062	13.19%
Republican	Jordan Piazza	20,012	9.76%
Democratic	C. Denise Marcelle	14,603	7.12%
Independent	E. Eric Guirard	2,968	1.45%
Republican	Frank Smith III	978	0.48%

The election resulted in a runoff between Broome and former Republican state representative Steve Carter, after no candidate received more than 50% of the vote.

== Runoff results ==
Incumbent Mayor Sharon Weston Broome won the December 5 runoff after securing a decisive 57% of the vote. Broome's opponent, former State Representative Steve Carter received 43%. Broome's victory was the first time any female had been re-elected to the position. Carter called Broome just after 9:30 p.m. December 5, 2020 to congratulate her on her victory. Baton Rouge has historically voted Democrat in its local elections. Only two Republicans have held the office over the last 100 years.

== See also ==
- 2020 Louisiana elections
