= Jesse L. Webb Jr. =

American politician

Jesse Lynn Webb Jr. (October 8, 1923 – April 28, 1956) was Mayor of Baton Rouge, Louisiana. He died in office in an airplane crash in 1956.

== Early life ==
Webb was born on October 8, 1923, to Jesse Lynn Webb and Maude (Borskey) Webb. He served in the U. S. Army. His father, Jesse L Webb Sr., served as assessor for East Baton Rouge Parish.

== Political career ==
At age 29, Webb was elected Mayor of Baton Rouge in 1952 and served from 1953 until his death on April 28, 1956, at Lansing, Michigan. He was the youngest person to hold that position and the first to hold the new title of Mayor-President. Webb was considered a moderate on the issue of racial segregation and under his leadership segregation in public buses was rolled back.

Webb was to attend a meeting in Lansing, Michigan when the aircraft he was flying in, owned by the East Baton Rouge Parish Sheriff's office, crashed near the Michigan capital. Webb was succeeded in office by his wife, Mary Estus Jones Webb, who served out the remainder of his term. She was the first woman Mayor-President of Baton Rouge-East Baton Rouge Parish. They had four children: Jesse Lynn, III, Leah Catherine (Forest), Charlotte Ann (Read) and James Clinton.
