= Bobby Ray Simpson =

American educator, accountant and politician

Mayor-President of Baton Rouge and East Baton Rouge Parish
- In office 2001 – January 3, 2005
- Preceded by: Tom Ed McHugh
- Succeeded by: Kip Holden

Mayor of Baker, Louisiana
- In office 1992–2000

Personal details
- Party: Republican
- Education: Louisiana State University (BS, MEd)

Bobby Ray Simpson (born 1953) is an American educator, accountant and Republican politician who served as mayor-president of Baton Rouge and East Baton Rouge Parish from 2001 to 2005. He previously served as mayor of Baker, Louisiana, from 1992 to 2000.

== Early life and career ==
Simpson was born in East Baton Rouge Parish in 1953. He earned bachelor of science and master of education degrees from Louisiana State University and became a certified public accountant. He also worked as a teacher.

== Political career ==
=== Mayor of Baker ===
Simpson served as mayor of Baker from 1992 through 2000. A Republican, he won reelection in 1996 against Lamon L. Moody Jr.

=== Mayor-president ===
Simpson ran for mayor-president of Baton Rouge and East Baton Rouge Parish in 2000. He and Democratic state Sen. Kip Holden advanced from the first round to a runoff. Simpson won the November 7 runoff and succeeded Tom Ed McHugh in 2001.

During his term, Simpson identified public safety as the city-parish government's foremost responsibility and supported police pay increases that he said had to remain within the government's budget. The search for the Baton Rouge serial killer became a major public-safety issue during his administration. After Derrick Todd Lee's arrest in 2003, Simpson defended the multi-agency task force against criticism of its investigation.

Simpson's administration participated in downtown redevelopment projects, including a bond-financed plan to restore the Heidelberg Hotel and Capitol House. In 2004, the city-parish petitioned a federal appeals court to delay a requirement that the Baton Rouge area use reformulated gasoline. Simpson and state environmental officials argued that the requirement would raise fuel costs without adequately addressing the area's industrial sources of ozone pollution.

Simpson sought reelection in 2004. He and Holden again advanced to a runoff, which Holden won with about 54 percent of the vote. Public safety and a labor dispute with the Baton Rouge police union were prominent issues in the campaign. Holden also benefited from an anti-Simpson advertising campaign organized by BRNext, a political action committee supported by local business figures. Holden succeeded Simpson on January 3, 2005.

== Later career ==
In November 2009, Simpson was appointed interim director of the Louisiana School for the Visually Impaired, where he had previously served as dean of students. He subsequently served as the school's director and retired on June 5, 2017.
