= Leon Jastremski =

French-born US Confederate soldier (1843–1907)

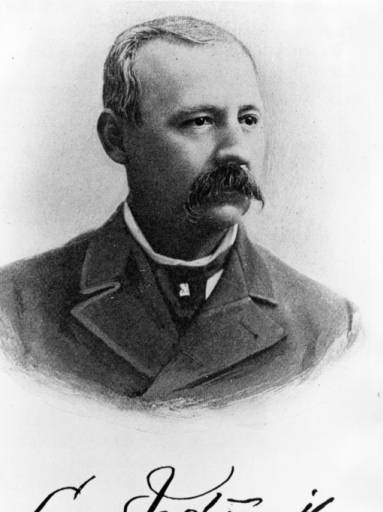

Mayor of Baton Rouge
- In office 1876–1882
- Preceded by: James Essex Elam
- Succeeded by: Joseph Charrotte

Personal details
- Born: July 17, 1843 Toulon, France
- Died: November 29, 1907 (aged 64) Baton Rouge, Louisiana, U.S.
- Party: Democratic
- Spouse(s): Rose Larguier (m. 1867); Sallie Land Ashton
- Children: 3

Military service
- Allegiance: Confederate States; Louisiana
- Branch/service: Confederate States Army; Louisiana National Guard
- Years of service: 1861 - 1865
- Rank: Captain (CSA); Brigadier General (National Guard)
- Battles/wars: American Civil War

Leon Jastremski (July 17, 1843 – November 29, 1907) was a French-born Confederate States Army soldier, journalist, and the three-term mayor of the Baton Rouge, Louisiana. During his mayoralty, he fought for and was instrumental in making Baton Rouge the state capital again. He was a co-founder of the United Confederate Veterans. He wrote political articles as a newspaper editor, including an editorial noted for its advocacy of racial segregation.

== Early life ==
Leon Jastremski was born in Toulon, France at the castle of the Count de Pontaut in 1843. His father was a Polish émigré who moved to France after participating in the Polish Uprising of 1830. His father married a French woman, became a medical doctor, and received a gold medal from King Louis Philippe for his service during a cholera epidemic in 1835.

While still an infant, Jastremski was left in the care of his mothers family when his parents and older brother immigrated to Louisiana, settling in Vermilionville. He migrated to Vermilionville after turning six and soon after, the reunited family moved to Abbeville. Both of his parents died in the winter of 1856, leaving thirteen year old Jastremski and his brother orphaned, and he began working as a printer's apprentice in the office of The Meridional.

== Military service ==
At the outbreak of the Civil War, seventeen year old Jastremski enlisted as a private in the 10th Louisiana Infantry under the command of Colonel Jacques de Mandeville. His regiment was attached to General John Magruder and sent to Virginia where he participated in the Peninsula campaign. In February 1862, he was promoted to Sergeant Major and fought in the Battle of Williamsburg. He also fought in the Seven Days Battle, seeing action along the Chickahominy River. During a night raid at the Battle of Malvern Hill, Jastremski was captured and sent to Fort Delaware as a prisoner of war, but was exchanged shortly after in August 1862.

After his released, he rejoined his regiment and was promoted to Captain. He led his unit in the capture of Harpers Ferry and fought in the battles of Antietam, Fredericksburg, Chancellorsville and Gettysburg. During the Battle of Spotsylvania Court House, he was captured at "the bloody angle" and again sent to Fort Delaware. In the summer of 1864, Jastremski was one of the six hundred Confederate officers sent to the prisoner of war camp at Morris Island off the coast of South Carolina. He was sent back to Fort Delaware that fall and was able to escape by hiding aboard a steamer headed for New York. From here, he made his way to Baltimore where he learned of General Lee's retreat from Petersburg. He made his way down to Mississippi where he reported to General Richard Taylor in Meridian, where he had just fallen back to from Mobile. Soon after, General Kirby, head of the Trans-Mississippi Department, surrendered. Jastremski was wounded twice during the war, in the throat at Chancellorsville and in the hand at Gettysburg.

He continued his military career in the Louisiana National Guard, being promoted to Brigadier General in 1881 by Governor Wiltz and was reappointed by Governor McEnery during both of his terms. Jastremski was a founding member of the United Confederate Veterans, created in 1889. He suggested creating it after attending a meeting of the Grand Army of the Republic.

== Political career ==
After the war he moved to Baton Rouge to work at his brother's drug store. In 1876 he was elected mayor of Baton Rouge with the support of former members of the Knights of the White Camelia. As mayor he was instrumental in restoring Baton Rouge as the state capital, and was re-elected twice.

Jastremski elected chairman of the Democratic State Central Committee, and led Grover Cleveland's presidential campaign in Louisiana. He was U.S. consul to Peru from 1893 to 1897, was appointed state commissioner of agriculture, and later served as a private secretary to the governor. Historian Donald Everett noted that Jastremski, despite his place in important leadership roles, never "received more than superficial attention". He ran for governor in 1904 without success but died before the 1908 gubernatorial election, which he also campaigned for, could be held. Historian James S. Pula suggests that racist ideology and white southern populism were likely used in his campaign platforms.

== Personal life and death ==
Jastremski married Rose Larguier on July 1, 1867. He attended church at the church that would later become St. Joseph Cathedral.

Despite his Polish name and Jewish ethnic background, he was born in France and wrote to his own family in French. In his biography Pills, Pens, & Politics, Edward Pinkowski found numerous Polish immigrants in Baton Rouge existed during his time, but there is no convincing proof that he was friends with them or took a paternalistic attitude towards them as mayor. Jastremski's documents and letters are held at Louisiana State University.

Jastremski died on November 29, 1907.
