= Stephen Carter (Louisiana politician) =

American politician (1943–2021)

Member of the Louisiana House of Representatives from the 68th district
- In office January 3, 2008 – January 3, 2020
- Succeeded by: Scott McKnight

Personal details
- Born: October 29, 1943 Baton Rouge, Louisiana, U.S.
- Died: January 26, 2021 (aged 77) Baton Rouge, Louisiana, U.S.
- Party: Republican
- Education: Louisiana State University (BA)

Stephen Frank Carter (October 29, 1943 – January 26, 2021) was an American politician from Louisiana who served in the Louisiana House of Representatives for the 68th district as a Republican from 2008 to 2020.

== Career ==
He was first elected in 2007 after defeating Kyle Ardoin in a run-off election. In 2019, due to term limits, he ran unsuccessfully for a seat in the Louisiana State Senate. Carter was the Republican nominee in the 2020 Baton Rouge mayoral election, placing second after Sharon Weston Broome.

== Personal life ==
Carter died from COVID-19 on January 26, 2021.
