= Elton Veals =

American football player (1961–2023)

No. 38
- Position: Running back

Personal information
- Born: March 26, 1961; Baton Rouge, Louisiana, U.S.
- Died: August 5, 2023 (aged 62)
- Listed height: 5 ft 11 in (1.80 m)
- Listed weight: 230 lb (104 kg)

Career information
- High school: Istrouma (Baton Rouge)
- College: Tulane
- NFL draft: 1984: 11th round, 303rd overall pick

Career history
- Pittsburgh Steelers (1984); San Francisco 49ers (1986)*; Indianapolis Colts (1987)*
- * Offseason or practice squad member only

Career NFL statistics
- Rushing attempts: 31
- Rushing yards: 87
- Return yards: 40
- Stats at Pro Football Reference

Elton Alvin Veals (March 26, 1961 – August 5, 2023) was an American professional football player who played running back for one season with the Pittsburgh Steelers of the National Football League (NFL).

== Early life ==
Elton Alvin Veals was born in Woodville, Mississippi. He attended Istrouma High School. After graduation he enrolled at Merritt Community College. Following his two years there he was involved in a controversial recruiting saga that ended up getting the University of Illinois placed on probation. Veals eventually enrolled in Tulane University in 1982 and played football for the Tulane Green Wave.

== Professional career ==
Veals was selected by the Pittsburgh Steelers in the eleventh round of the 1984 NFL draft. He played in fifteen career NFL games.

== Death ==
Veals died on August 5, 2023, at the age of 62.
