= Sid Edwards =

American politician and football coach (born 1963)

65th Mayor-President of Baton Rouge and East Baton Rouge Parish
- Incumbent
- Assumed office January 2, 2025
- Preceded by: Sharon Weston Broome

Personal details
- Born: January 5, 1963 (age 63) Baton Rouge, Louisiana, U.S.
- Party: Republican
- Spouse: Maureen Edwards
- Children: 4
- Education: Nicholls State University

Emile "Sid" Edwards (born January 5, 1963) is an American politician and former high school football coach who has served as the mayor-president of Baton Rouge and East Baton Rouge Parish since January 2025. A member of the Republican Party, he defeated Democratic incumbent Sharon Weston Broome in the runoff of the 2024 Baton Rouge mayoral election, receiving 54 percent of the vote. He was the first Republican elected mayor-president since Bobby Simpson in 2000.

Before entering politics, Edwards spent 27 seasons as a head football coach at five Louisiana high schools and compiled a record of 203–91. His teams at Redemptorist High School won state football championships in 2002 and 2003, and he also coached the school's boys basketball team to a state championship in 2003. Edwards later served as head football coach and dean of students at Istrouma High School. He was inducted into the Louisiana High School Sports Hall of Fame in 2026.

Edwards campaigned on addressing crime, blight and homelessness. As mayor-president, he has overseen the transfer of municipal services and sales-tax revenue to the newly incorporated city of St. George. His administration also proposed the Thrive EBR tax-rededication plan to address a city-parish budget shortfall. Voters rejected all three components of the proposal in November 2025, after which the Metropolitan Council adopted departmental and workforce reductions for the 2026 budget.

== Early life and education ==
Edwards is a Baton Rouge native. He attended Redemptorist High School and graduated from Nicholls State University.

== Coaching career ==
Edwards began coaching at age 16, initially coaching his younger sister's softball team. His high school coaching career included positions at Catholic High School, Redemptorist High School, Jesuit High School, Holy Savior Menard, Central High School and Istrouma High School.

At Redemptorist, Edwards coached football teams that won the Louisiana High School Athletic Association Class 3A state championship in 2002 and the Class 4A championship in 2003. He also coached the school's boys basketball team to a state championship in 2003. Following one-year tenures at Jesuit and Holy Savior Menard, he coached at Central High School for 17 seasons and took the football team to the Class 5A state semifinals during his third season.

Edwards later served as Istrouma's head football coach and dean of students. He finished his football head-coaching career with a record of 203–91 over 27 seasons at five schools. In April 2026, he was inducted into the Louisiana High School Sports Hall of Fame.

== Mayor-president of Baton Rouge ==
=== 2024 election ===
In July 2024, Edwards qualified as a Republican candidate for mayor-president in his first campaign for public office. He said that violence and poverty affecting Istrouma students, including the killing of one of his players, helped motivate his candidacy. Edwards campaigned on addressing crime, blight and homelessness and proposed hiring 100 additional police officers.

Edwards faced scrutiny after voting records showed that he had not participated in 25 elections over more than eight years. He apologized for not voting and said he had withdrawn from politics partly because promised teacher pay raises had repeatedly failed to materialize.

Eight candidates competed in the November 5 first round. Edwards placed first with 34% of the vote, followed by Democratic incumbent Sharon Weston Broome with 31% and Democratic former state representative Ted James with 28%. Edwards and Broome advanced to the December 7 runoff. During the runoff, Edwards presented himself as the candidate of change, while Broome emphasized her experience, infrastructure investments and government stability. The incorporation of St. George and its implications for parish finances were also issues in the race.

Edwards defeated Broome in the runoff, receiving 57,308 votes (54%) to Broome's 48,587 (46%). He became the first Republican elected mayor-president since Bobby Simpson in 2000.

=== Tenure ===
Edwards was sworn in on January 2, 2025, at the River Center Theater for the Performing Arts. In his inaugural address, he identified public safety as his administration's first priority and also discussed economic development and support for small businesses.

Before taking office, Edwards selected Baton Rouge businessman Charlie Davis as chief administrative officer. He also appointed former Baton Rouge police chief Jeff LeDuff and former legislative fiscal analyst Monique Appeaning as assistant chief administrative officers.

In September 2025, Edwards moved Davis into a newly created chief efficiency officer position and appointed consultant Christel Slaughter acting chief administrative officer. The administration said Slaughter would serve temporarily while a national search was conducted.

Edwards named Slaughter permanent chief administrative officer in November. WAFB subsequently reported that no national search had been conducted and that Slaughter's company, SSA Consultants, had initially been considered for a $50,000 contract to conduct the search. The administration said the proposed search contract was never written or executed and that Slaughter had agreed to assist without charge.

Later that month, the administration announced that Slaughter would no longer be chief administrative officer and would instead serve as an adviser. The parish plan of government requires the chief administrative officer to be a city-parish employee. In December, the Metropolitan Council approved a one-year, $180,000 contract with SSA Consultants for Slaughter to continue working in the mayor's office without the chief administrative officer title. The administration said using a consulting contract would save approximately $70,000 by avoiding employee-benefit costs.

==== Public safety, blight and homelessness ====
Edwards assigned assistant chief administrative officer Jeff LeDuff responsibility for coordinating public-safety efforts among parish agencies. After Edwards's first year in office, his administration reported that citywide crime had fallen by 15 percent and homicides by 13 percent during 2025, with 80 homicides recorded—the lowest total since 2019. The Baton Rouge Police Department continued to experience staffing shortages, however, with approximately 150 officer vacancies reported in March 2026.

In March 2026, Edwards proposed increasing the salaries of sworn police officers by 15 percent. Some members of the Metropolitan Council advocated raises for other city-parish employees as well, citing a compensation study commissioned by the council. The council approved the police raises in April, increasing the starting salary from approximately $40,000 to $58,000 and providing for a salary of $65,000 after an officer's first year.

The administration increased spending on the demolition of blighted structures from approximately $140,000 in 2024 to $1.5 million in 2025. It reported demolishing 200 structures during 2025, compared with 49 during the previous year.

Edwards's administration also established a homelessness-prevention office and a six-member street-outreach team. By March 2026, the team reported 789 encounters with unhoused people, including repeated contacts, and said approximately 200 people had been connected with mental-health or addiction services or provided transportation to relatives. A representative of the nonprofit One Stop Homeless Services Center said that additional housing remained necessary to address homelessness in the parish.

==== Budget and Thrive EBR ====
In February 2025, Edwards introduced a proposal called Revive EBR in response to a projected $52 million city-parish budget shortfall associated with the incorporation of St. George. The proposal would have redirected money from the East Baton Rouge Parish Library System to the general fund for expenses including public safety and road improvements. Library officials opposed the proposal, disputing Edwards's characterization of the library's fund balance as a surplus and saying the money was reserved for operations, maintenance and construction projects.

The administration subsequently advanced a revised proposal called Thrive EBR. It consisted of three ballot measures that would have renewed and partially rededicated property taxes supporting the library system, the East Baton Rouge Council on Aging and the parish's mosquito-abatement program. The administration said the proposal would transfer $52.4 million to reduce city-parish debt without increasing the combined tax rate. Voters rejected all three measures on November 15. The library measure failed with 53 percent voting against it, while the mosquito-abatement and Council on Aging measures failed with 52 percent and 51 percent opposition, respectively.

Following the vote, Edwards laid off four employees in the mayor-president's office and directed most city-parish departments to prepare for budget reductions. Police and fire services were exempted from the proposed cuts. In December, the Metropolitan Council unanimously approved an amended 2026 budget containing reductions across most departments. Council members reduced their own operating budget by more than 19 percent and redirected approximately $550,000 to several affected agencies. In February 2026, the administration said that 46 city-parish positions were being eliminated under the resulting workforce-reduction plan.

==== St. George transition ====
In April 2025, Edwards's administration reached an agreement with the newly incorporated city of St. George concerning the transfer of tax revenue and municipal services. Under the agreement, St. George would assume responsibility for services including road maintenance and drainage and begin retaining revenue from a two-percent sales tax on July 1. The Metropolitan Council approved the agreement by a 10–2 vote.

Council members who opposed the agreement argued that it did not resolve several matters, including sewer services, the city's legal incorporation date and possible liability for tax revenue collected after St. George voters approved incorporation in 2019. Administration officials described the agreement as the first stage of a longer transition. In July, the two governments reached an additional agreement allowing St. George residents to continue using the parish's 311 system and parish work crews while the city developed its own service capacity.

==== Recall effort ====
A petition to recall Edwards was filed with the Louisiana Secretary of State on January 30, 2026. Its organizers alleged that Edwards had failed to provide effective leadership, demonstrate transparency and accountability, and act consistently in parish residents' interests. Edwards rejected the allegations and cited his administration's reported results concerning crime, homelessness and blight. Organizers had 180 days to collect 47,297 valid signatures to place the recall before voters.

The petition contained 2,193 names when it was submitted at the July deadline, falling short of the number required to hold a recall election.

== Personal life ==
Edwards is married to Maureen "Beanie" Edwards. They have four children and three grandchildren.

Political offices
Preceded by Sharon Weston Broome	Mayor of Baton Rouge; 2025–present	Incumbent
