= John R. Dufrocq =

American politician

John Robert Dufrocq (1814–1860) was a newspaper editor and first Mayor of Baton Rouge, Louisiana.

== Early life ==
Born in Canada about 1814, Dufrocq was a journeyman printer.

== Career in Baton Rouge ==
He moved to Baton Rouge and became editor of the Baton Rouge Gazette. Dufrocq was naturalized in Baton Rouge in 1844. He married Anna Converse in 1844, but she died in May 1849 at the age of 24.

In the 1840s, Dufrocq was appointed a Justice of the Peace and became chief magistrate of the town of Baton Rouge. In 1850, he began using the title of Mayor of Baton Rouge and so is known as the first mayor of Baton Rouge. He was elected mayor and served until 1855.

== Death and memorials ==
Dufrocq died in May 1860 and was buried in Baton Rouge. Subsequently Dufrocq Street was named for him, and the Dufrocq School was either named for him or the street. Later Dufrocq street was renamed North Nineteenth Street.
