= Mary Estus Jones Webb =

American politician (1924–1995)

Mary Estus Jones Webb (May 14, 1924 – September 16, 1995) became Mayor-President of Baton Rouge in 1955 on the death of her husband, Jesse L. Webb Jr. in a plane crash. She was the first woman to serve as Mayor-President of Baton Rouge.

== Early life ==
Webb was born in Columbia, Louisiana on May 14, 1924, to James Melton Jones and Hattie Estus Head. She married Jesse Lynn Webb, Jr. and they had four children (Jesse Lynn, III, Leah Catherine (Forest), Charlotte Ann (Read), and James Clinton.

== Tenure as Mayor-President ==
Her husband was only 29 when he was elected Mayor-President of Baton Rouge in 1952. Three years later, he died on April 28, 1956, when the aircraft he was flying in crashed while on final approach at Lansing, Michigan. City-parish law allowed for a majority of the city-parish council to appoint a successor. She was informally offered the position on May 4 by then acting Mayor-President Frank J. McConnell and said she would accept it. The city-parish council officially appointed her following a vote on May 9. She did not seek election in her own right in 1956.

== Later years ==
She served as Sigma Pi Fraternity housemother at Louisiana State University for many years. Webb died on September 16, 1995, and was buried at Roselawn Cemetery in Baton Rouge.
