= Avon Honey =

American politician (1947–2010)

Member of the Louisiana House of Representatives from the 63rd district
- In office 2002–2010
- Preceded by: Kip Holden
- Succeeded by: Dalton W. Honoré

Personal details
- Born: May 1, 1947 Baton Rouge, Louisiana
- Died: February 12, 2010 (aged 62)
- Party: Democratic
- Spouse: Linda
- Education: Southern University
- Profession: educator

Avon R. Honey (May 1, 1947 – February 12, 2010) was a Democratic member of the Louisiana House of Representatives for the 63rd District since his victory in a special election held in March 2002 until his death in office.

Honey was elected to succeed Kip Holden, who was elected to the Louisiana State Senate and later as Mayor-President of Baton Rouge.
