= Magnolia Cemetery (Baton Rouge, Louisiana) =

Cemetery in Louisiana, US

- U.S. National Register of Historic Places
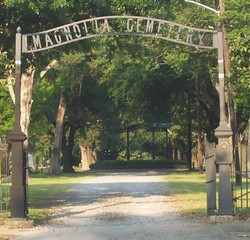
- Entrance to Magnolia Cemetery

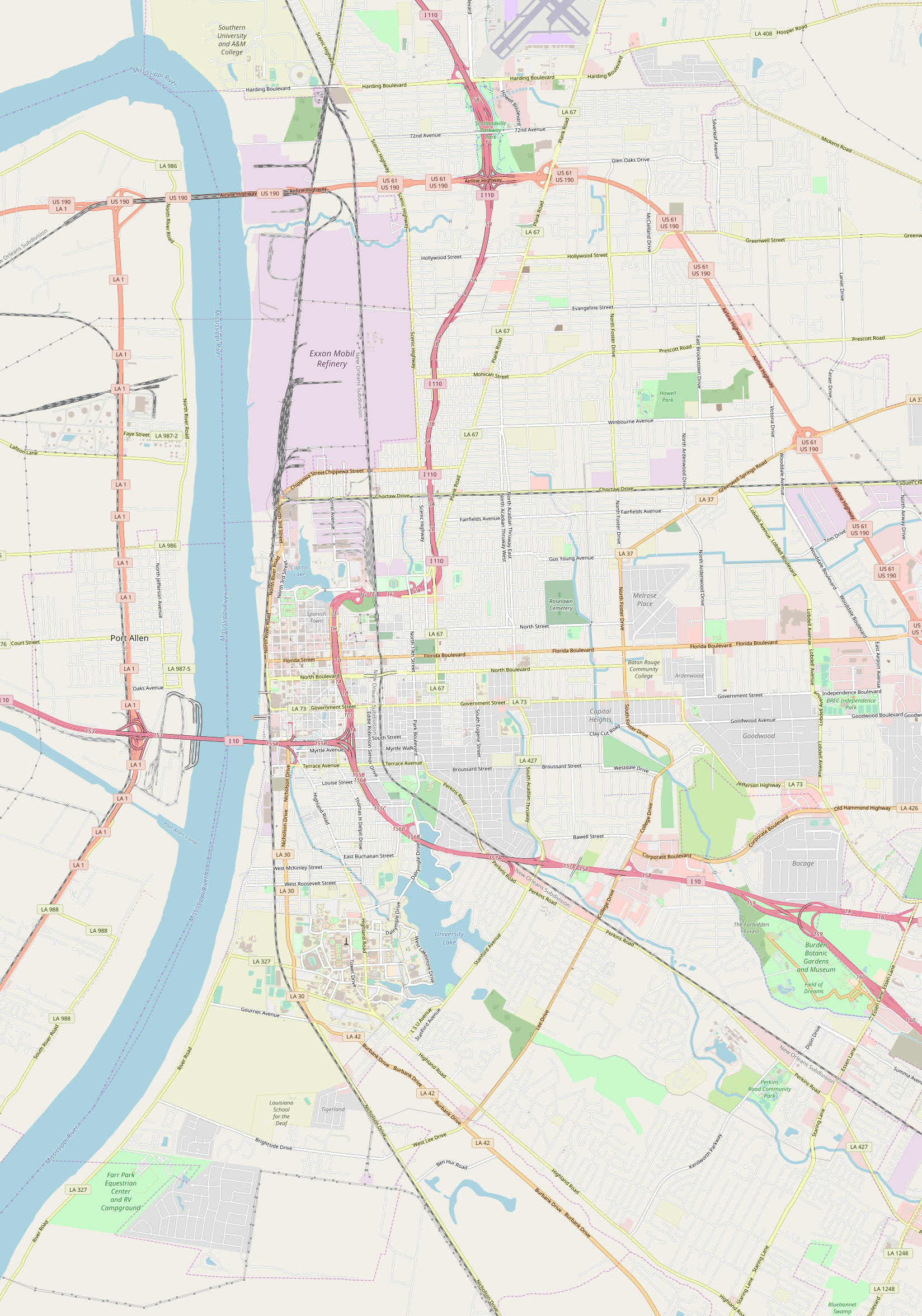
- Location within Baton Rouge
- Location: 422 North 19th Street; Baton Rouge, Louisiana
- Coordinates: 30°27′04″N 91°10′03″W
- Area: 20 acres (8.1 ha)
- Built: 1820s
- NRHP reference No.: 85000161
- Added to NRHP: January 31, 1985

Magnolia Cemetery is a 10-acre (4.0 ha) cemetery in Baton Rouge, Louisiana.

== Description ==
The cemetery is located at 422 North 19th Street and is bordered on the north by Main Street and on the south by Florida Boulevard. The west and east sides are bordered by 19th Street and 22nd Street, respectively. The land for the cemetery was purchased by the town of Baton Rouge from John Christian Buhler Jr, in August 1852, with burials in the area dating back to the 1820s according to some sources. The cemetery was the site of intense fighting during the Battle of Baton Rouge on August 5, 1862; a commemorative ceremony is held at the cemetery each August. It was turned over to the city of Baton Rouge in 1947 and is now administered by the Recreation and Park Commission for the Parish of East Baton Rouge (BREC).

Magnolia Cemetery was added to National Register of Historic Places on January 31, 1985.

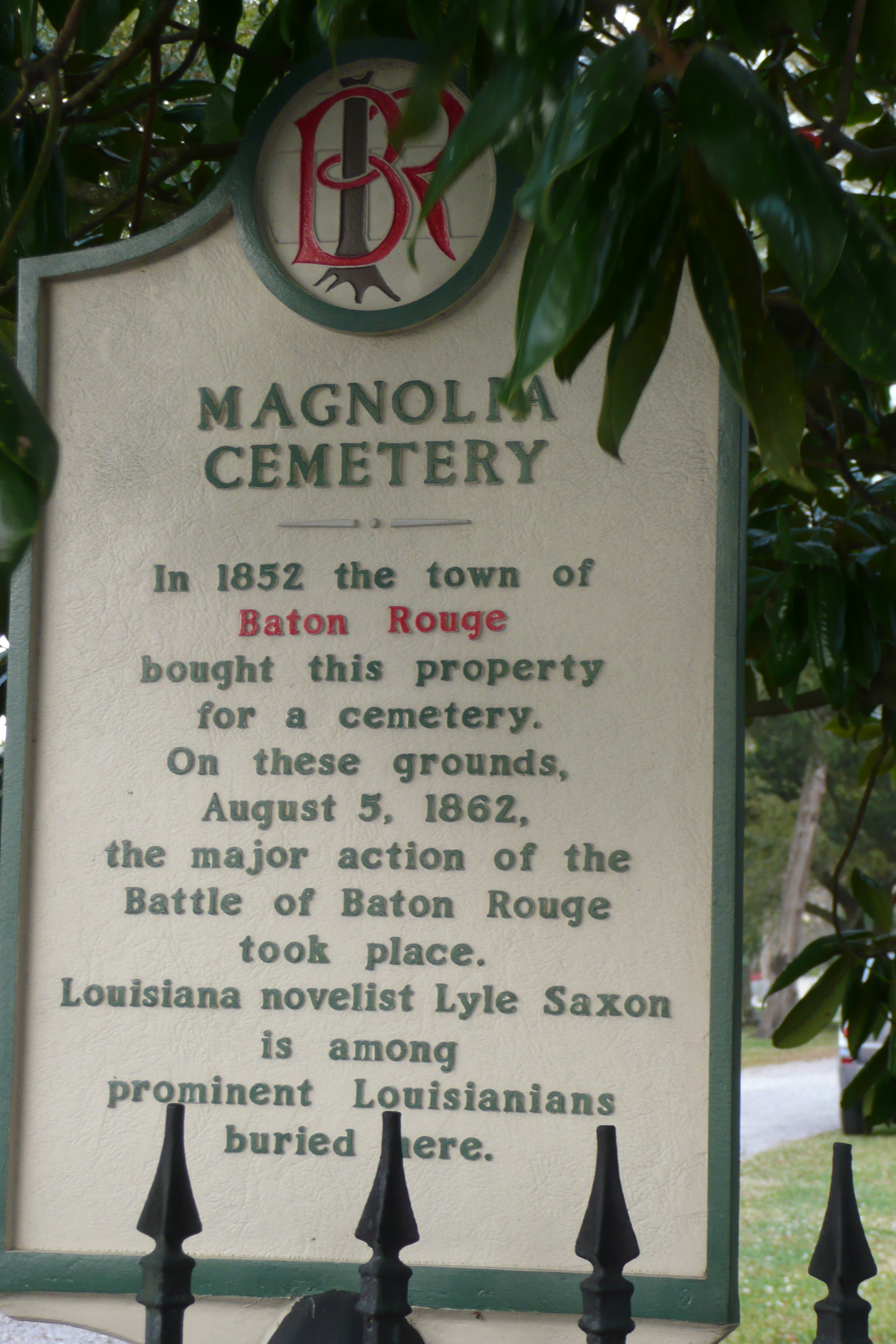
Magnolia Cemetery has been a Baton Rouge Cemetery since 1852

== Notable burials ==
This cemetery was the main burial site for most prominent citizens of Baton Rouge, white and African-American, from 1820s to the 1970s and burials continue to the present. These include sugar planter and philanthropist John Hill (1824–1910), novelist Lyle Saxon (1891–1946), and "Florence Nightengale of the South" Confederate nurse Joanna Fox Waddill (1838–1899).

Among the noteworthy politicians buried here are:

- US Congressman Thomas Withers Chinn (1791–1852)
- Whig politician James M. Elam (1796–1856) and his son James Essex Elam (1829–1873)
- Granddaughter of Mayor of Baton Rouge, former Register of State Lands Ellen Bryan Moore (1912–1999)
- Cecil Morgan (1898–1999), the state representative who moved to impeach Huey Pierce Long Jr.
- 6th District Congressman Edward White Robertson (1823–1887) and his son Congressman Samuel Matthews Robertson (1852–1911)
- 5th District Congressman William B. Spencer (1835–1882)

== See also ==
- Baton Rouge National Cemetery
- National Register of Historic Places listings in East Baton Rouge Parish, Louisiana
