= Jewel J. Newman =

American politician

Member of the Louisiana House of Representatives
- In office 1984–1988

Personal details
- Born: Jewel Joseph Newman; March 3, 1921 Baton Rouge, Louisiana, U.S.
- Died: October 4, 2014 (aged 93)
- Party: Democratic

Jewel Joseph Newman (March 3, 1921 – October 4, 2014) was an American politician. A member of the Democratic Party, he served in the Louisiana House of Representatives from 1984 to 1988.

== Life and career ==
Newman was born in Baton Rouge, Louisiana, the son of Joseph Newman and Florence Knox. He attended McKinley High School, graduating in 1941. After graduating, he attended Southern University, but his education was interrupted when he enlisted in the United States Army during World War II, which after his discharge, he operated his own business for fifteen years.

Newman served in the Louisiana House of Representatives from 1984 to 1988.

== Death ==
Newman died on October 4, 2014, at the age of 93.
