= Istrouma High School =

Location
- 3730 Winbourne Ave. Baton Rouge, Louisiana 70805; United States; 30.478137°N 91.151912°W

Information
- Type: Free public
- Established: 1917
- School district: East Baton Rouge Parish
- Principal: Dr. Cleotha Johnigan Jr.
- Teaching staff: 50.99 (FTE)
- Grades: 9 - 12
- Enrollment: 697 (2023-2024)
- Student to teacher ratio: 13.67
- Campus type: Urban
- Colors: Maroon and Silver
- Mascot: Indian
- Nickname: Indians
- Rival: Glen Oaks Panthers; Baton Rouge Bulldogs (1917-76)
- Yearbook: Pow Wow
- Website: ebrschools.org/istroumahigh/

Istrouma High School is an accredited public school located in Baton Rouge, Louisiana, United States. It was founded in 1917, and is located in East Baton Rouge Parish. Its name is a local Indian word meaning "red stick." Red stick is also the English language translation of the French words baton rouge. The area of north Baton Rouge where the school is located is also known as the Istrouma area.

== History ==
Istrouma High School began in 1917, in a two-room frame building with a faculty of two. In 1921 the school moved to a larger brick building at the corner of Erie Street and Wenonah Street. The school had its first graduations in 1921, in the form of the grammar school portion having graduations that year. The first high school graduations came in 1924. In 1931 another building was added at the corner of Erie Street and Tecumseh Street. The school first fielded a football team and band in 1935. With increasing enrollment, a third (and much larger) building was added in 1940, at the corner of Erie Street and Osceola Street. The school's name and location were proposed to be changed in 1945 to Franklin D. Roosevelt High School. This name change never occurred, but the school did move to its current location on Winbourne Ave, in 1951. This move and expansion became necessary due to increased enrollment caused by the Louisiana Legislature adding a twelfth grade to school curriculums in 1949. The old school buildings became the home of Istrouma Junior High School, and were later torn down in 2005.

Being located in North Baton Rouge, Istrouma High School, was considered for most of its history as the school for the sons and daughters of blue collar plant workers. Its major cross-town rival was Baton Rouge High School until 1976, when BRHS discontinued its football program.

In 2012, the school was taken over, and was being running as part of the Louisiana Recovery School District. In October 2013, it was announced that Istrouma High School would close down for at least one year following the 2013–2014 school year. This announcement almost immediately sparked petitions from old and new alumni to keep the school, which was nearing its 100-year anniversary mark, open. The school was merged with Capitol High School and reopened at Capitol High's campus starting with the 2015–2016 school year. The Istrouma High building continues to be used as school board administrative offices. The school re-opened in Summer 2017 to a renovated campus and new academic programs.

The school was closed for the 2014–2015, 2015–2016, and 2016–2017 academic school years due to repeated failure of meeting state standards and drastic falling enrollment. Most students who would traditionally attend Istrouma were expected to attend Capitol Senior High School (ran by Friendship Public Charter School of D.C.) near Downtown Baton Rouge. The state was planning to reopen the school as a charter by the 2015–2016 academic school year starting with only a freshman class but did not.

In August 2017, Istrouma reopened after $24.1 million worth of renovations and new developments were completed on campus. The school opened with only 9th and 10th graders on campus, with plans to gradually add 11th and 12th graders in the following academic school year. The school revamped its academic offerings and programs to better prepare students for college and employment after high school graduation.

== Faculty ==
The school faculty was made up of 72 teachers in a wide array of disciplines including courses in sciences, mathematics, language arts, physical education, health, reading, marketing education, music, family & consumer science, technology education, business, sociology, social studies, visual arts, graphic arts, special education courses, foreign language (French & Spanish), JROTC, carpentry, and welding.

Early in his career, Baton Rouge-area State Representative Donald Ray Kennard was an Istrouma faculty member and coach.

Baton Rouge Mayor-President Sid Edwards was Istrouma's head football coach at the time of his 2024 election.

== Student body ==
Historically, Istrouma High was a popular destination for white students mostly from middle class families. However, due to nationwide desegregation efforts to ensure more African-American students had access to the same high quality resources and facilities as white students enrolled in public schools, white flight in the Istrouma High surrounding area ensued and the school gradually became more diverse racially and economically. Since the 1980s, Istrouma has been composed mostly with African-American students from working class families.

== Athletics ==
Istrouma High School currently participates in the Louisiana High School Athletic Association 4A athletic class for boys' and girls' sports.

=== Championships ===
Football championships

- (10) State Championships: 1938 (2A), 1950 (2A), 1951 (2A), 1955 (3A), 1956 (3A), 1957 (3A), 1958 (3A), 1959 (3A), 1961 (3A), 1962 (3A)
- (2) State Runners-up: 1937 (1A), 1976 (4A)

=== Football ===
Notable football players

- Billy Cannon - 1959 Heisman Trophy Winner at LSU, AFL and NFL running back. Cannon was named a high school All-American before graduating and attending to LSU. Started at tight end for the Oakland Raiders in Super Bowl II.
- George Rice - LSU's 1965 TSN All-American
- Roy Winston - 1961 consensus All-American at LSU. Winston played 15 seasons (1962–76) at linebacker for the Minnesota Vikings, appearing in four Super Bowls (IV, VIII, IX, XI).

== Notable alumni ==
- Billy Cannon (Class of 1956) - Professional football player and Heisman Trophy winner.
- Woody Jenkins (Class of 1965) - Member of the Louisiana House of Representatives from East Baton Rouge Parish, 1972–2000
- Dalton Jones, Former MLB player (Boston Red Sox, Detroit Tigers, Texas Rangers)
- Eddie J. Lambert (Class of 1974) - state representative from Ascension Parish
- Le'Veon Moss (Class of 2022) - college football running back for the Texas A&M Aggies
- George Rice - Former LSU and AFL Football player with the Houston Oilers
- Ivory A. Toldson - American English academic and former executive director of the White House Initiative on Historically Black Colleges and Universities
- Elton Veals - NFL player
