= Louisiana School for the Visually Impaired =

Location
- 2888 Brightside Lane; Baton Rouge, Louisiana 70820; United States; 30°23′35″N 91°11′17″W

Information
- NCES School ID: 220001800193
- Principal: Susan Covington
- Grades: PK–12
- Gender: Coeducational
- Enrollment: 67 (2018–19)
- Colors: Blue and gold
- Mascot: Trojan
- Nickname: Trojans
- Website: www.ssdofla.org/o/lsvi/

Louisiana School for the Visually Impaired (LSVI) is a PK–12 state-operated school located at 2888 Brightside Lane in Baton Rouge, Louisiana, United States. The school has both blind and other visually impaired students, and shares its campus with the Louisiana School for the Deaf.

It has dormitory facilities.

== Athletics ==
LSVI athletics competes in the LHSAA.
