= Vanessa Caston LaFleur =

American attorney and politician

Member of the Louisiana House of Representatives from the 101st district
- Incumbent
- Assumed office April 11, 2022
- Preceded by: Ted James

Personal details
- Born: Vanessa Caston Baton Rouge, Louisiana, U.S.
- Party: Democratic
- Spouse: Brian LaFleur I
- Children: 2
- Education: Southern University (BA, JD)

Vanessa Caston LaFleur is an American attorney and politician serving as a member of the Louisiana House of Representatives from the 101st district. She assumed office on April 11, 2022.

== Early life and education ==
LaFleur was born and raised in Baton Rouge, Louisiana. After graduating from Baton Rouge Magnet High School in 1986, she earned a Bachelor of Arts degree from Southern University in 1990 and a Juris Doctor from the Southern University Law Center in 1993.

== Career ==
In the Louisiana Department of Revenue, LaFleur served as director of the Tax Policy Services Division and Audit Protest Bureau. She later served as general counsel for the Louisiana Tax Commission and director of the Legal Division of the Louisiana Public Service Commission. She was also a member of the Louisiana Board of Ethics. LaFleur was elected to the Louisiana House of Representatives in a 2022 special election, succeeding Ted James.
