= Kip Holden =

American politician (1952–2025)

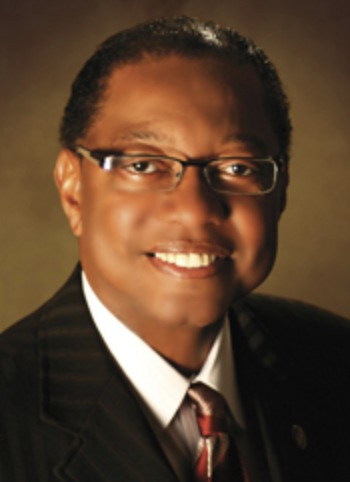

Mayor-President of Baton Rouge and East Baton Rouge Parish (Note: The office of "Mayor-President" in the Baton Rouge area is an uncommon position in municipal governments that consolidates the executive offices of "Mayor of Baton Rouge" and "President of East Baton Rouge Parish". Though the City of Baton Rouge and East Baton Rouge Parish have a consolidated government, this differs from a traditional consolidated city-county government, as the cities of Zachary, Baker, and Central operate their own individual city governments within East Baton Rouge Parish.)
- In office January 3, 2005 – December 31, 2016
- Preceded by: Bobby Simpson
- Succeeded by: Sharon Weston Broome

Member of the Louisiana Senate from the 15th district
- In office 2002–2004
- Preceded by: Wilson Fields
- Succeeded by: Sharon Weston Broome

Member of the Louisiana House of Representatives from the 63rd district
- In office 1988–2002
- Preceded by: Jewel J. Newman
- Succeeded by: Avon Honey

Personal details
- Born: Melvin Lee Holden; August 12, 1952 New Orleans, Louisiana, U.S.
- Died: May 14, 2025 (aged 72) Baton Rouge, Louisiana, U.S.
- Party: Democratic
- Spouse: Lois Stevenson
- Children: 5
- Education: Louisiana State University, Baton Rouge (BA); Southern University, Baton Rouge (MA, JD)

Melvin Lee "Kip" Holden (August 12, 1952 – May 14, 2025) was an American politician who served from 2005 to 2016 as the Democratic Mayor-President of Baton Rouge and East Baton Rouge Parish, Louisiana. The parish includes the state capital of Baton Rouge and smaller suburban cities such as Baker, Central City, and Zachary.

Holden was the unsuccessful Democratic candidate in the 2015 race for lieutenant governor, losing to Republican Billy Nungesser.

He vacated his position as Mayor-President at the end of 2016 and was succeeded by Sharon Weston Broome, another member of the Democratic Party.

== Early life and education ==
Holden studied at Louisiana State University in Baton Rouge, where he graduated with a Bachelor of Arts in Journalism in 1974. He then studied at Southern University in Baton Rouge where he graduated Master of Arts in Journalism in 1982. He then went to Southern University Law Center in Baton Rouge where he graduated a Juris Doctor in 1985.

== Early career ==
Previous to his political career, Holden was a journalist and later an attorney.

He also worked at the Louisiana Department of Labor as a clerk in the Workers' Compensation Office, at the Baton Rouge City Police as a public information officer, and at the United States Census Bureau as a public relations specialist. He also worked at WXOK Radio in Port Allen as a news director (in 1975 and 1977), at WWL Radio in New Orleans as a Reporter (in 1977 and 1978), and at WBRZ Channel 2, Baton Rouge as a Reporter (in 1978 and 1979).

From 1991, he was an adjunct professor of law at Southern University Law Center - Baton Rouge.

He was a Member of the Baton Rouge Metro Council from District 2 from 1984 until 1988. He represented Louisiana State Representative from District 63 from 1988 until 2002. He served as Louisiana State Senator from District 15 from 2002 until 2004

He ran unsuccessfully for mayor-president of Baton Rouge in 1996 and 2000.

== Mayoralty ==
=== 2004 election ===
Holden was elected mayor-president on November 3, 2004, when he unseated the Republican incumbent, Bobby Simpson of Baker. Holden was inaugurated on January 3, 2005.

Holden's election of East Baton Rouge Parish was fostered through the support of his urban black base but also with substantial support from suburban whites, many being Republicans. Support from the latter group was buoyed by backing from Jim Bernhard, CEO of The Shaw Group, and several other figures in business and industry. The dissatisfaction with Mayor-President Simpson was demonstrated in dramatic fashion by the fact that President Bush received 54 percent of the parish vote in his re-election campaign, and then U.S. Representative Richard Hugh Baker received 69 percent. In the same election Holden matched Bush's 54 percent parishwide total.

Holden became a member of the Mayors Against Illegal Guns Coalition, an organization formed in 2006 and co-chaired by Mayors Michael Bloomberg of New York City and Thomas Menino of Boston, Massachusetts.

In 2008, Holden was inducted into the Louisiana Political Museum and Hall of Fame in Winnfield.

=== 2008 reelection ===
In 2008, Holden was resoundingly reelected with 71 per cent of the vote.

=== 2012 reelection ===
Holden handily won reelection in the nonpartisan blanket primary held in conjunction with the national election on November 6, 2012. One of his opponents, Republican J. Michael "Mike" Walker Sr., a member of the Metro Council, questioned Holden and the city-parish for having provided security services for Louis Farrakhan when the Nation of Islam spokesman addressed a group on October 3 at Southern University. Walker's advertisement includes a video of Farrakhan thanking Holden and the police chief for security services and Farrakhan's escort to Baton Rouge from the airport in New Orleans.

With 115,305 votes (60 percent), Holden defeated three opponents. Walker finished second with 65,972 ballots (34.3 percent). Two Independents held the remaining 5.7 percent of the vote.

== Efforts at higher office ==
=== 2015 lieutenant gubernatorial campaign ===
Holden led the four-candidate field in the primary with 360,679 votes (33.3 percent), qualifying him to face Nungesser in a runoff, who finished second in the primary with 324,654 votes (30 percent). In a strong third-place was John Young, who polled 313,183 votes (28.9 percent). Departing State Senator Elbert Guillory ran last with 85,460 votes (7.9 percent). In the second round of balloting, Nungesser finished with 628,864 votes (55.4 percent) to Holden's 506,578 (44.6 percent). Holden nevertheless was an easy winner in populous Orleans and East Baton Rouge parishes.

=== 2016 congressional campaign ===
In 2016, Holden, who was term-limited as Mayor-President in Baton Rouge, ran unsuccessfully for the U.S. House to represent Louisiana's 2nd congressional district held by fellow Democrat Cedric Richmond. The district has long been based in New Orleans, but had been redrawn after the 2010 census to include a slice of western Baton Rouge, including most of the capital's black precincts.

Holden finished with only 20 percent of the ballots cast to Richmond's 70 percent. Sharon Weston Broome, who had succeeded Holden in the state Senate, also succeeded him as Mayor-President after her 52-48 percent victory over Republican state Senator Bodi White in the runoff election held on December 10, 2016.

== Later life and death ==
Holden died following an illness at a hospice in Baton Rouge, on May 14, 2025, at the age of 72.

== See also ==
- List of first African-American mayors

== Notes ==
Party political offices
Vacant Title last held by Caroline Fayard	Democratic nominee for Lieutenant Governor of Louisiana; 2015	Succeeded by Willie Jones
Louisiana House of Representatives
Preceded by Jewel Joseph Newman	Member of the Louisiana House of Representatives from the 63rd district 1988–2002	Succeeded by Avon R. Honey
Louisiana State Senate
Preceded by Wilson Fields	Member of the Louisiana Senate from the 15th district 2002–2004	Succeeded by Sharon Weston Broome
Political offices
Preceded by Bobby Simpson	Mayor-President of Baton Rouge and East Baton Rouge Parish; 2005–2016	Succeeded by Sharon Weston Broome
