= Ted James (Louisiana politician) =

American politician

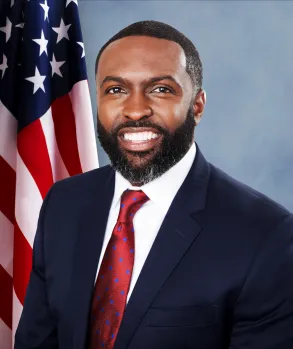

Member of the Louisiana House of Representatives from the 101 district
- In office January 9, 2012 – January 5, 2022
- Preceded by: Wesley T. Bishop
- Succeeded by: Vanessa Caston LaFleur

Personal details
- Party: Democratic
- Education: Southern University (BS); Southern University Law Center (JD)

Edward "Ted" James is an American politician from the state of Louisiana who served as a regional administrator in the U.S. Small Business Administration from 2022 to 2024. A member of the Democratic Party, he previously represented the 101st district in the Louisiana House of Representatives from 2012 to 2022. He ran for mayor of Baton Rouge in the 2024 election, coming in third in the jungle primary.

== Professional career ==
James is an attorney. He held several positions in Louisiana state government, including staff attorney for the Louisiana House Labor Committee and policy advisor to governor Kathleen Blanco.

== Political career ==
James was elected to the Louisiana House of Representatives in 2011 and re-elected in 2015 and 2019. He chaired the Criminal Justice Committee and the Louisiana Legislative Black Caucus.

James resigned his seat in 2022 after accepting a job as Region VI Administrator for the U.S. Small Business Administration. He oversaw the administration's operations in Arkansas, Louisiana, New Mexico, Oklahoma, and Texas. James resigned his position in January 2024.

== Personal life ==
James lives in Baton Rouge.
