= James Essex Elam =

American politician

James Essex Elam (1829–1873) was Mayor of Baton Rouge, Louisiana, serving four terms between 1858 and his death in 1873.

== Early life ==
Elam, the son of James M. Elam and Rebecca Chambers, was born in Baton Rouge on December 7, 1829. He attended Lagrange College in Kentucky (1846-1847) and graduated from Centenary College in Jackson, Louisiana, in 1850. Elam graduated from law school at the University of Louisiana (now Tulane University) in New Orleans. Elam then returned to Baton Rouge to practice law with his father. He married Mary E. Vanlandingham on April 20, 1860, and they had four sons and a daughter.

== Political career ==
After practicing law with his father until his father's death in 1856, Elam ran for Mayor in 1858 and was elected at the age of 29. He served from 1858 - 1862. He was again elected mayor in 1865 and served until 1869. In 1870, he was again elected mayor as a Democrat and served until his death in 1873. In all, he served 4 terms as mayor.

== Death and burial ==
Elam died on July 31, 1873, while serving his fourth non-consecutive term as Mayor of Baton Rouge. It was reported that "he enjoyed the respect of every individual in the community during his long public career" He was interred in the family plot in the Magnolia Cemetery in Baton Rouge.
