= Sharon Weston Broome =

American politician (born 1956)

- Broome, in 2018

Mayor-President of Baton Rouge and East Baton Rouge Parish
- In office January 2, 2017 – January 2, 2025
- Preceded by: Kip Holden
- Succeeded by: Sid Edwards

99th President of the National League of Cities
- In office November 16, 2024 – January 1, 2025
- Preceded by: David Sander
- Succeeded by: Steve Patterson

President pro tempore of the Louisiana Senate
- In office January 14, 2008 – January 11, 2016
- Preceded by: Diana Bajoie
- Succeeded by: Gerald Long

Member of the Louisiana Senate from the 15th district
- In office January 12, 2005 – January 11, 2016
- Preceded by: Kip Holden
- Succeeded by: Regina Barrow

Speaker pro tempore of the Louisiana House of Representatives
- In office January 2004 – January 12, 2005
- Preceded by: Peppi Bruneau
- Succeeded by: Yvonne Dorsey-Colomb

Member of the Louisiana House of Representatives from the 29th district
- In office January 13, 1992 – January 12, 2005
- Preceded by: Clyde Kimball
- Succeeded by: Regina Barrow

Personal details
- Born: Sharon Weston; October 1, 1956 (age 70) Chicago, Illinois, U.S.
- Party: Democratic
- Spouse: Marvin Broome
- Children: 3
- Education: University of Wisconsin, La Crosse (BA); Regent University (MA)

Sharon Weston Broome (born October 1, 1956) is an American politician and former television reporter who served as mayor-president of Baton Rouge and East Baton Rouge Parish from 2017 to 2025. A member of the Democratic Party, she was the first African-American woman to hold the office. Broome won the 2016 Baton Rouge mayoral election, was reelected in 2020 and lost her campaign for a third term to Republican Sid Edwards in 2024.

Broome began her political career on the East Baton Rouge Parish Metropolitan Council in 1988. She represented District 29 in the Louisiana House of Representatives from 1992 to 2005 and became the first woman elected speaker pro tempore of the chamber in 2004. She subsequently represented District 15 in the Louisiana State Senate from 2005 to 2016 and served as president pro tempore from 2008 to 2016. Broome was the first woman to hold the pro tempore leadership position in both chambers of the Louisiana State Legislature. She also served as the 99th president of the National League of Cities from November 2024 until January 2025.

During her mayoral tenure, Broome introduced the MoveBR transportation program, improved public safety with a real-time crime center, and invested in children with the Head Start Restart program, and commissioned a parish stormwater master plan following the 2016 Louisiana floods. She opposed the incorporation of St. George, arguing that it would adversely affect Baton Rouge's finances. Her legacy includes major infrastructure and economic development initiatives.

== Early life and career ==
=== Early life and education ===
Broome was born on October 1, 1956, in Chicago, Illinois. She attended Carter Elementary School, where Mamie Till-Mobley, the mother of Emmett Till, was her third-grade teacher.

Broome earned a bachelor's degree in mass communication from the University of Wisconsin–La Crosse and a master's degree in communications from Regent University. Before entering politics, she worked as a reporter for WBRZ-TV for five years.

=== East Baton Rouge Metro Council ===
Broome was elected to the East Baton Rouge Parish Metropolitan Council in 1988, defeating a 12-year incumbent.

=== Louisiana House of Representatives ===
Broome represented District 29 in the Louisiana House of Representatives from 1992 to 2005. She chaired the House Committee on Municipal, Parochial and Cultural Affairs from 1996 through 2003. In 2004, she became the first woman elected speaker pro tempore of the Louisiana House.

=== Louisiana State Senate ===
After Broome moved to the Louisiana Senate, Regina Barrow succeeded her in the House. Barrow had previously worked as Broome's legislative assistant.

Broome represented District 15 in the Louisiana State Senate from 2005 to 2016 and served as president pro tempore from 2008 to 2016. She was the first woman to have held the pro tempore leadership positions in both chambers of the Louisiana Legislature.

Broome's legislative tenure was highlighted by her work to assist victims of domestic violence, including Act 151 and Act 456.

== Mayor of Baton Rouge ==
=== 2016 election ===
In May 2015, Broome, who was term-limited from the Louisiana Senate, became the first candidate to announce a campaign to succeed Kip Holden as mayor-president. Her campaign emphasized parish unity and proposals to improve access to health care in North Baton Rouge.

Broome led the November 8 first round with 60,368 votes, or 31.62 percent, and advanced to a runoff against Republican state Senator Bodi White. On December 10, she defeated White with 59,637 votes, or 51.83 percent, to White's 55,421 votes, or 48.17 percent.

Broome was sworn into office on January 2, 2017.

=== First term ===
==== Appointments ====
In December 2017, Broome selected Louisiana State Police Lieutenant Colonel Murphy Paul as Baton Rouge police chief. Paul was sworn into office in January 2018.

==== Policies and Issues ====
===== Infrastructure =====
In 2018, Broome proposed the MoveBR transportation program, funded through a 30-year half-cent sales tax. East Baton Rouge Parish voters approved the tax on December 8, 2018. The program was projected to raise approximately $1 billion for nearly 70 road, sidewalk and traffic-improvement projects. The tax took effect in April 2019, and the program formally began that September.

Broome also commissioned an East Baton Rouge Parish stormwater master plan in April 2017 following the 2016 Louisiana floods. In 2019, the parish secured $15 million for the plan, including $11.25 million from the Federal Emergency Management Agency and $3.75 million committed by the Louisiana Office of Community Development. The plan was intended to guide drainage projects and flood-mitigation policies throughout the parish.

MoveBR followed the Green Light Plan, a 42-project road program introduced in 2006 during Mayor-President Kip Holden's administration. Some unfinished Green Light Plan projects, including the widening of Perkins Road between Pecue Lane and Siegen Lane, were later incorporated into MoveBR.

===== St. George incorporation =====
On October 12, 2019, voters within the proposed boundaries of St. George, then an unincorporated area of East Baton Rouge Parish, approved incorporation with 54 percent of the vote.

In November 2019, Broome and other plaintiffs challenged the incorporation, arguing that its organizers had not adequately explained how the proposed city would provide public services and that incorporation would adversely affect the finances of Baton Rouge. A state district court denied incorporation in 2022, and the Louisiana First Circuit Court of Appeal affirmed that decision in 2023. On April 26, 2024, the Louisiana Supreme Court reversed the lower courts in a 4–3 decision, concluding that St. George could provide public services within a reasonable period and that its incorporation was reasonable.

=== 2020 election ===
The 2020 mayoral election was held on November 3, with a runoff on December 5, to elect the mayor-president of East Baton Rouge Parish.

Broome faced six opponents in the first round. No candidate received a majority, resulting in a runoff between the top two candidates: Broome, a Democrat, and former Republican state representative Steve Carter. Broome received 48 percent of the first-round vote, while Carter received 20 percent.

The election took place during the COVID-19 pandemic, which was among the issues addressed by the candidates.

Broome won the December 5 runoff with 57 percent of the vote, while Carter received 43 percent, securing Broome a second term. Her victory made her the first woman reelected as East Baton Rouge Parish mayor-president.

== Second Term ==
=== Appointments ===
Police Chief Murphy Paul announced his retirement in July 2023 and remained in office while Broome selected his successor. On December 21, Broome appointed Thomas S. "T.J." Morse Jr., a BRPD officer with more than 20 years of service and the department's commander of training services, as police chief. Morse was selected from five finalists and was sworn in on January 16, 2024.

=== 2024 election ===
Broome sought a third term in 2024. Eight candidates competed in the November 5 election. Republican political newcomer Sid Edwards, the head football coach at Istrouma High School, placed first with 34% of the vote; Broome received 31%; and Democratic former state representative Ted James received 28%. Because no candidate received a majority, Edwards and Broome advanced to a December 7 runoff.

During the runoff, Broome emphasized her administration's experience and infrastructure investments and presented herself as the candidate of stability. Edwards campaigned as a change candidate, focusing on crime, blight and homelessness. The incorporation of St. George and its implications for parish finances were also issues in the runoff.

Edwards defeated Broome in the runoff, receiving 57,308 votes (54%) to Broome's 48,587 (46%), ending her eight years as mayor-president.

=== Personal life ===
Sharon Weston Broome married Marvin Alonzo Broome in 2000. They have three children and three grandchildren.

Louisiana House of Representatives
Preceded by Clyde Kimball	Member of the Louisiana House of Representatives from the 29th district 1992–2005	Succeeded by Regina Barrow
Preceded by Peppi Bruneau	Speaker pro tempore of the Louisiana House of Representatives; 2004–2005	Succeeded by Yvonne Dorsey-Colomb
Louisiana State Senate
Preceded by Kip Holden	Member of the Louisiana Senate from the 15th district 2005–2016	Succeeded by Regina Barrow
Preceded by Diana Bajoie	President pro tempore of the Louisiana Senate; 2008–2016	Succeeded by Gerald Long
Political offices
Preceded by Kip Holden	Mayor of Baton Rouge; 2017–2025	Succeeded by Sid Edwards
