= List of mayors of Baton Rouge, Louisiana =

The office of Mayor of Baton Rouge, Louisiana was formally created in 1818 as the chief executive of the City of Baton Rouge, Louisiana, which has been the state capital of Louisiana continuously since 1849 (except for a brief time during and after the Civil War when Opelousas, Shreveport, or New Orleans held that title). Baton Rouge's current chief executive is Sid Edwards.

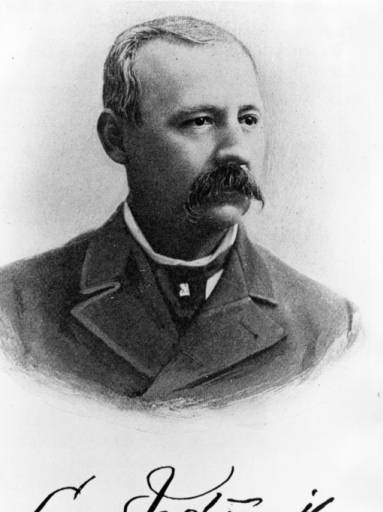
Leon Jastremski, mayor from 1876 to 1882.

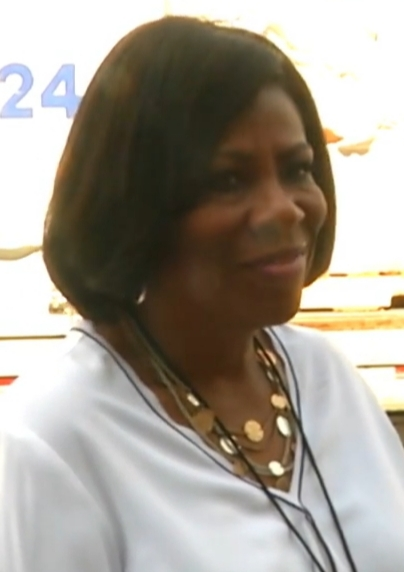
Sharon Weston Broome, mayor-president from 2017 to 2024.

== Background ==
Baton Rouge was granted the right to incorporate as a town in 1817 under legislation approved by Louisiana's second governor, Jacques Villeré. The city was chartered the following year and led by a magistrate who was chosen among the popularly-elected, five-member board of selectmen. Selectmen were up for election annually.

Early mayors also served only one-year terms. The office had a two-year term in the 1880s and was increased to four years in duration in 1898.

The first mayoral election under "city" status was in 1846 between James Cooper (who had previously served as a magistrate) and John Dufrocq, a Whig Party member who won the balloting. In 1856 another noteworthy race occurred, this time between Know Nothing mayor Joseph Monget and his Democratic challenger, Edward Cousinard; after actually tying in the popular vote, the commissioners of election decided to award the election to the incumbent. Cousinard later won the mayor's seat himself in the 1857 election.

The city's government essentially ceased to exist for the duration of the Civil War, once the Battle of Baton Rouge had commenced in 1862. In 1863, the victorious Union Army subsequently divided the Baton Rouge area into districts and sub-districts that were administered by "commanders"—in this case, military officials who had basically been temporarily rotated out of a combat zone and given administrative duties in the local military occupation area for several weeks or months at a time as a brief respite before returning to the battlefield. With such short-term assignments, some of these commanders reportedly made much more of a favorable impression on the locals for their efforts to govern and to assist with the rebuilding of the city than others did.

Later, after the return to civilian rule, the city government was also largely stripped of influence at one point by the First Reconstruction Act, which was issued in 1867 and caused it to miss an entire election cycle in the process.

Multiple mayoral elections during the Reconstruction Era were disputed. After the 1871 election Gov. Henry Clay Warmoth did what he legally could from the temporary capitol in New Orleans to briefly prop up the new African American Republican mayor, Loyeau Berhel —who was facing an overwhelmingly Democratic-controlled board of selectmen—but by the next year Warmoth himself was facing a mounting impeachment effort and forced to broaden what remained of his support by reaching out to Democrats who had a much more solid base in Louisiana than the Republicans did; he declared the similarly disputed election results for the next term in 1872 null and void, and awarded the state's commission to the Democratic candidate. Ultimately, that 1872–73 term essentially ended up with two separately-functioning city governments, one recognized primarily by African American and pro-Union white Republicans (including so-called "carpetbaggers" and "scalawags") and one recognized primarily by native white Democrats. Although the term "city council" had been used on occasion before, the board of selectmen really seems to have begun transitioning over to the use of the term under the Republican mayor that year, perhaps in anticipation of needing to differentiate it from the competing board of selectmen that the Democrats were in the process of setting up (the board finally formally adopted the title "city council" in 1874). The Republicans had shown improvements in their organizational efforts (and electoral strength in general) by being able to initially win the 1872 election without Warmoth's help—and then by holding a share of the government for the duration of that term. While the Democratic mayor, James Essex Elam, had been willing to fight to hang on to his seat after the disputed votes of 1871 and 1872, he either determined that he had no chance at the ballot box in the 1873 annual municipal elections or he simply no longer felt up to the challenge any more (he did, in fact, die only several months after the scheduled election date). Shortly before the election was to be held, African American state senator J. Henri Burch, a prominent area Republican, met with Elam, and they negotiated a compromise where Elam would resign his position and support new governor William Pitt Kellogg's appointment of the Republican incumbent to the mayor's seat—along with three Republicans and three Democrats to the city council (as selected by a conference committee). This compromise was largely acceptable to both sides (very rare for Reconstruction)—although even then a group describing itself as Fusionists (Liberal Republican Party members and a rogue faction of Democrats who had vowed to support John McEnery's sinking claim to the governorship to the bitter end) attempted to hold the canceled municipal elections any way (which apparently failed to draw many to the polls and quickly faded away). After making it through 1873 relatively peacefully, Kellogg also reappointed the mayor in 1874. The Republicans did finally win a municipal election in their own right in 1875, but in 1876 the Democrats were able to use various forms of intimidation, including by former members of the old Knights of the White Camelia, to regain the mayor's seat for the first of 28 consecutive Democratic chief executives.

In 1914 the city began using a city commission government under then-mayor Alex Grouchy, Jr. (it had already been in the works before the sudden death of Mayor Jules Roux the year before). In 1949 the governments of the city and the Parish of East Baton Rouge were largely consolidated under then-mayor S. Powers Higginbotham, and in 1982 they were fully merged into a single governing body (similar to a consolidated city-county, although the municipalities of Baker, Central, St. George, and Zachary remain self-governing). At that time, the title of "mayor" changed to "mayor-president," being that they were now both mayor of Baton Rouge and president of East Baton Rouge Parish. Indeed, four recent mayor-presidents resided in Baker, Central, or Zachary at the time of their elections, giving them the distinction of serving as mayor of Baton Rouge without actually living there; no candidate from the newly-incorporated City of St. George has been elected mayor-president yet, however.

Elam held office for the most terms, ten one-year terms (including four consecutive at one point, between 1865 and 1869). While no families have dominated the office over the years, Baton Rouge's longest-serving mayor—Wade Bynum (24 years over two different periods of time)—did replace his brother Turner Bynum after he died in office, and Mary Webb was later appointed by the city council to complete the term of her late husband, Jesse Webb, Jr. Despite these rare family connections, Baton Rouge's mayors have still tended to share commonalities in the sense that most were white male Democrats. However, the last five mayor-presidents have included multiple Republicans and African Americans, as well as a woman. In fact, the current mayor-president, Edwards, is a Republican.

== List of magistrates, mayors, commanders, and mayor-presidents ==
Below is a list of Baton Rouge's chief executives—magistrates from 1818 to 1846, mayors from 1846 to 1863 and again from 1865 to 1949, (Union Army district and sub-district) commanders from 1863 to 1865, and mayor-presidents from 1949 to present. The town magistrate was an appointive office, determined from among the elected five-member board of selectmen. All city mayors and city-parish mayor-presidents were otherwise popularly elected, unless specified below.

| Nº | Image | Chief Executive | Term start | Term end | Party | Note(s) |
|---|---|---|---|---|---|---|
Magistrates—Town of Baton Rouge
| 1 | | William Williams | 1818 | 1820 | | also served from 1821-1822 |
| 2 | | François "Palo" Gardere | 1820 | 1821 | | born in Kingdom of France |
| 3 | | William Williams | 1821 | 1822 | | also served from 1818-1820 |
| 4 | | William Wykoff | 1822 | 1823 | | |
| 5 | | Jason Candee | 1823 | 1824 | | |
| 6 | | Bartholomew Beauregard | 1824 | 1828 | | |
| 7 | | William Grivet | 1828 | 1829 | | |
| 8 | | William R. Willis | 1829 | 1832 | | also served from 1833-1834 |
| 9 | | John Reid | 1832 | 1833 | | also served from 1845-1846 |
| 10 | | William R. Willis | 1833 | 1834 | | also served from 1829-1832 |
| 11 | | P. A. Walker | 1834 | 1835 | | |
| 12 | | Raphael Legendre | 1835 | 1836 | | also served from 1836-1838 |
| 13 | | Stephen Henderson | 1836 | 1836 | | resigned |
| 14 | | Raphael Legendre | 1836 | 1838 | | also served from 1835-1836 |
| 15 | | William Gil | 1838 | 1839 | | |
| 16 | | James Cooper | 1839 | 1843 | | also served from 1844-1845 |
| 17 | | Abel Waddill | 1843 | 1844 | | |
| 18 | | James Cooper | 1844 | 1845 | | also served from 1839-1843 |
| 19 | | John Reid | 1845 | 1846 | | also served from 1832-1833 |
Mayors—City of Baton Rouge
| 20 | | John R. Dufrocq | 1846 | 1855 | Whig | born in British Lower Canada; 1854: re-elected unopposed |
| 21 | | Joseph Monget | 1855 | 1857 | Know Nothing | 1856: appointed, by commissioners of election, due to election resulting in a tie vote of 223–223 |
| 22 | | Edward Cousinard | 1857 | 1859 | Democratic | |
| 23 | | James Essex Elam | 1859 | 1862 | Democratic | also served from 1865-1869, from 1870-1871, from 1871-1872, and from 1872-1873 (served more terms than any other mayor, 10) |
| 24 | | Benjamin Franklin Bryan | 1862 | 1862 | Democratic | resigned, due to Battle of Baton Rouge; also served from 1888-1890 and from 1894-1896 |
| 25 | | Jordan Holt | 1862 | 1863 | Democratic | 1862: appointed, by board of selectmen; also served in 1865 and in 1872 |
Commanders—District of Baton Rouge
| 26 | | Brig. Gen. Philip St. George Cooke | 1863 | 1864 | | |
| 27 | | Brig. Gen. Henry Warner Birge | 1864 | 1864 | | |
| 28 | | Brig. Gen. William Plummer Benton | 1864 | 1864 | | also served later in 1864 |
| 29 | | Brig. Gen. Fitz Henry Warren | 1864 | 1864 | | |
| 30 | | Brig. Gen. William Plummer Benton | 1864 | 1864 | | also served earlier in 1864 |
Commanders—Sub-District of Baton Rouge
| 31 | | Col. William J. Landram | 1864 | 1864 | | |
| 32 | | Brig. Gen. Joseph Bailey | 1864 | 1865 | | |
Commanders—District of Baton Rouge
| 32 continued | | Brig. Gen. Joseph Bailey | 1865 | 1865 | | |
| 33 | | Brig. Gen. Edmund J. Davis | 1865 | 1865 | | |
| 34 | | Col. John Giles Fonda | 1865 | 1865 | | also served later in 1865 |
| 35 | | Bvt. Maj. Gen. Michael Kelly Lawler | 1865 | 1865 | | born in British Ireland |
| 36 | | Bvt. Brig. Gen. John Giles Fonda | 1865 | 1865 | | also served earlier in 1865 |
Mayors—City of Baton Rouge
| 37 | | Jordan Holt | 1865 | 1865 | Democratic | acting mayor; appointed, by Gov. J. Madison Wells; resigned, to serve in Louisiana House of Representatives; also served from 1862-1863 and in 1872 |
| 38 | | James Essex Elam | 1865 | 1869 | Democratic | 1865: appointed, by Wells; 1867: election canceled, due to order by Gen. Philip Sheridan; in accordance with the implementation of the First Reconstruction Act also served from 1859-1862, from 1870-1871, from 1871-1872, and from 1872-1873 (served more terms than any other mayor, 10) |
| 39 | | Oliver P. Skolfield | 1869 | 1870 | Democratic | |
| 40 | | James Essex Elam | 1870 | 1871 | Democratic | also served from 1859-1862, from 1865-1869, from 1871-1872, and from 1872-1873 (served more terms than any other mayor, 10) |
| 41 | | Loyeau Berhel | 1871 | 1871 | Republican | certified elected, by Democratic-controlled commissioners of election; commissioned to assume office, by Gov. Henry Clay Warmoth but was eventually removed after charges of voting irregularities upheld by Democratic-controlled electoral investigative committee; first African American mayor; first Republican mayor |
| 42 | | James Essex Elam | 1871 | 1872 | Democratic | 1871: retroactively declared elected by Democratic-controlled electoral investigative committee; also served from 1859-1862, from 1865-1869, from 1870-1871, and from 1872-1873 (served more terms than any other mayor, 10) |

| Nº | Image | Chief Executive | Term start | Term end | Party | Note(s) | Nº | Image | Chief Executive | Term start | Term end | Party | Note(s) |
|---|---|---|---|---|---|---|---|---|---|---|---|---|---|
| Mayor—City of Baton Rouge's Republican-controlled government | | | | | | | Mayors—City of Baton Rouge's Democrat-controlled government | | | | | | |
| 43 | | Henry Schorten | 1872 | 1873 | Republican | born in Kingdom of Prussia; certified elected, by commissioners of election and remained in office after charges of voting irregularities dismissed by Democratic-controlled electoral investigating committee; first white Republican mayor; first Republican mayor to serve full term | 44 | | Jordan Holt | 1872 | 1872 | Democratic | acting mayor; after his and Democratic-controlled Board of Selectmen's endorsement of petition signed by prominent local citizens, Schorten's election win was voided, by Warmoth |
| 43 | | Henry Schorten | 1872 | 1873 | Republican | born in Kingdom of Prussia; certified elected, by commissioners of election and remained in office after charges of voting irregularities dismissed by Democratic-controlled electoral investigating committee; first white Republican mayor; first Republican mayor to serve full term | 45 | | James Essex Elam | 1872 | 1873 | Democratic | commissioned to assume office, by Warmoth; resigned, due to the creation of the bipartisan "compromise list of candidates for the city government" for Gov. William Pitt Kellogg to appoint |
| Mayor—City of Baton Rouge's compromise government | | | | | | | Mayor—City of Baton Rouge's Fusionist-controlled government | | | | | | |
| 43 continued | | Henry Schorten | 1873 | 1875 | Republican | government appointed under Republican–Regular Democrat compromise; 1873: appointed, by Kellogg; 1874: reappointed, by Kellogg | 46 | | A. W. Simmons | 1873 | 1873 | Democratic | government elected under Liberal Republican–McEnery Democrat faction fusion |

| Nº | Image | Chief Executive | Term start | Term end | Party | Note(s) |
|---|---|---|---|---|---|---|
Mayors—City of Baton Rouge
| 43 continued | | Henry Schorten | 1875 | 1876 | Republican | 1875: elected, without controversy |
| 47 | | Leon Jastremski | 1876 | 1882 | Democratic | born in France; may have been first Jewish mayor (sources differ whether he was Jewish or Roman Catholic, as he appears to have had a parental upbringing that included exposure to both faiths; was a known parishioner of St. Joseph Catholic Church) |
| 48 | | Joseph Charrotte † | 1882 | 1883 | Democratic | died in office |
| 49 | | John Wax | 1883 | 1883 | Democratic | acting mayor; born in Kingdom of France; also served from 1896-1898 |
| 50 | | William S. Booth | 1883 | 1884 | Democratic | |
| 51 | | Gustavus L. Vay | 1884 | 1888 | Democratic | born in France; also served from 1890–1894 |
| 52 | | Benjamin Franklin Bryan | 1888 | 1890 | Democratic | also served in 1862 and from 1894-1896 |
| 53 | | Gustavus L. Vay | 1890 | 1894 | Democratic | also served from 1884–1888 |
| 54 | | Benjamin Franklin Bryan | 1894 | 1896 | Democratic | also served in 1862 and from 1888-1890 |
| 55 | | John Wax | 1896 | 1898 | Democratic | also served in 1883 |
| 56 | | Robert A. Hart | 1898 | 1902 | Democratic | |
| 57 | | Robert L. Pruyn | 1902 | 1902 | Democratic | resigned, due to commitments of his building contractor business |
| 58 | | Ben Mayer | 1902 | 1903 | Democratic | acting mayor; may have been first Jewish mayor (depending upon whether Jastremski actually was or not) |
| 59 | | Wade Bynum | 1903 | 1910 | Democratic | also served from 1923–1941 (served more years than any other mayor, 24) |
| 60 | | Jules Roux † | 1910 | 1913 | Democratic | died in office |
| 61 | | Isidore Larguier | 1913 | 1913 | Democratic | acting mayor |
| 62 | | Alex Grouchy | 1913 | 1922 | Democratic | 1913: appointed, by city council |
| 63 | | Turner Bynum † | 1922 | 1922 | Democratic | died in office |
| 64 | | Louis Ricaud | 1922 | 1923 | Democratic | acting mayor |
| 65 | | Wade Bynum | 1923 | 1940 | Democratic | also served from 1903–1910 (served more years than any other mayor, 24) |
| 66 | | Fred S. LeBlanc | 1941 | 1944 | Democratic | resigned, to serve as Louisiana Attorney General |
| 67 | | S. Powers Higginbotham | 1944 | 1948 | Democratic | 1944: appointed, by Gov. Jimmie Davis; |
Mayor-Presidents—City of Baton Rouge & Parish of East Baton Rouge
| 67 continued | | S. Powers Higginbotham | 1949 | 1952 | Democratic | |
| 68 | | Jesse L. Webb, Jr. † | 1953 | 1956 | Democratic | died in office |
| 69 | | Frank J. McConnell | 1956 | 1956 | Democratic | acting mayor |
| 70 | | Mary Estus Jones Webb | 1956 | 1956 | Democratic | appointed, by city council; first female mayor |
| 71 | | Jack Christian | 1957 | 1964 | Democratic | |
| 72 | | Woodrow Dumas | 1965 | 1980 | Democratic | resident of Baker at time of election |
| 73 | | Pat Screen | 1981 | 1988 | Democratic | |
| 74 | | Tom Ed McHugh | 1989 | 2000 | Democratic | resident of Zachary at time of election; 1995: changed party affiliation to Republican; first Republican mayor since Reconstruction Era |
| 74 | | Tom Ed McHugh | 1989 | 2000 | Republican | resident of Zachary at time of election; 1995: changed party affiliation to Republican; first Republican mayor since Reconstruction Era |
| 75 | | Bobby Ray Simpson | 2001 | 2004 | Republican | mayor of Baker at time of election |
| 76 | | Kip Holden | 2005 | 2016 | Democratic | first African American mayor since Reconstruction Era; first African American mayor to serve full term; first Democratic African American mayor |
| 77 | | Sharon Weston Broome | 2017 | 2024 | Democratic | first elected female mayor; first female mayor to serve full term; first female African American mayor |
| 78 | | Sid Edwards | 2025 | Present | Republican | resident of Central at time of election |

Note: the 1872–73 mayoral term featured two competing claims to the title, one from a Republican-controlled city government led by Henry Schorten and one from a Democrat-controlled city government led by Jordan Holt and, later, James Essex Elam; for what it is worth, Schorten physically occupied the actual mayor's chair in the city hall, at least initially, effectively leaving those Holt and Elam administrations as a de facto rump government—however, possession of the municipal governing apparatus appears to have remained within active contention for the remainder of the term.

== See also ==
- Timeline of Baton Rouge, Louisiana
