= Louisiana's 65th House of Representatives district =

American legislative district

Louisiana's 65th State House of Representatives district
Representative
Lauren Ventrella; R–Greenwell Springs

Louisiana's 65th House of Representatives district is one of 105 Louisiana House of Representatives districts. It is currently represented by Republican Lauren Ventrella of Central.

== Geography ==
HD65 includes part of the Baton Rouge metropolitan area. It includes the city of Central and parts of the city of Denham Springs.

== Election results ==
Year	Winning candidate	Party	Percent	Opponent	Party	Percent
2011	Clifton Richardson	Republican	100%			
2013 - Special	Barry Ivey	Republican	53%	Scott Wilson	Republican	47%
2015	Barry Ivey	Republican	100%			
2019	Barry Ivey	Republican	100%			
2023	Lauren Ventrella	Republican	56.7%	Brandon Ivey	Republican	43.3%
