= District 4-5A (LHSAA) =

High school athletic league in Louisiana, US

District 4
- Association: Louisiana High School Athletic Association
- Classification: 5A
- Sport: Various
- Founded: 1991
- No. of teams: 7
- Country: United States

District 4 is an athletic league, a member of the 5A division of the Louisiana High School Athletic Association (LHSAA). Division 5A is the highest level in the LHSAA, comprising schools with more than 1,159 students. The 5A classification was established in 1991. The current seven members are among 68 schools classified as 5A, of which 63 play all sports including football (including all seven District 4 schools). Members are generally from East Baton Rouge Parish and Livingston Parish. The league's structure will keep the same schools at least until the summer of 2017. Teams and individuals from these schools have won state championships.

== Members ==
- Baton Rouge High School, Baton Rouge
- Catholic High School, Baton Rouge
- Central High School, Central
- Liberty Magnet High School, Baton Rouge
- Scotlandville Magnet High School, Baton Rouge
- St Joseph's Academy, Baton Rouge
- Woodlawn High School, Baton Rouge
- Zachary High School, Zachary

== Former members ==
- Baker High School
- Belaire High School
- Broadmoor High School
- Denham Springs High School
- Dutchtown High School
- East Ascension High School
- Istrouma High School
- Live Oak High School
- McKinley Senior High School
- St. Amant High School
- Tara High School
- Walker High School

== Sports ==
=== Fall ===
- Cross country, boys and girls
- Football
- Swimming, boys and girls
- Volleyball

=== Winter ===
- Basketball, boys and girls
- Indoor track and field, boys and girls
- Powerlifting
- Soccer, boys and girls
- Wrestling

=== Spring ===
- Baseball
- Bowling
- Golf, boys and girls
- Gymnastics, boys and girls
- Softball
- Tennis, boys and girls
- Outdoor track and field, boys and girls

There is also non-sanctioned cheerleading.

== State championships ==
=== Central ===
- Baseball 2017, 1995, 1994, 1993, 1992, 1978
- Bowling 2015 Jacob Carretson
- Football 1966
- Track 2010 indoor 55m and outdoor 100m, Trevor Sansome

=== Denham Springs ===
- Baseball 1986
- Boys basketball 1956 (1A), 1950, 1948, (1923?), 2005 State Gatorade Player of the Year, Tasmin Mitchell
- Track 2014,2015, 2016,2017 girls high jump Abigail O'Donoghue

=== Live Oak ===
- Boys basketball 1956 (B)
- Track
  - 2013 girls shot put, Ashley Davis
  - 2014 girls shot put, Ashley Davis,
  - 2015 girls shot put, Ashley Davis

=== Scotlandville ===
- Boys basketball 2012, 2013, 2015
- Track
  - 1996 girls 4×100 relay (4A state record), girls 4×200 relay (4A state record)
  - 2005 girls 4×200 relay (3A state record), girls 4×400 relay (3A state record)

=== Walker ===
- Basketball
  - 2018 boys basketball

2018/19 Gatorade Player of the year: Jalen Cook

- Track
  - 2014 boys pole vault, Kyle Baudoin

=== Zachary ===
- Baseball
  - 2009 4A, 2008 4A, 2007 4A 2009 State Gatorade Player of the Year, Zachary Von Rosenburg
- Boys basketball 1944, 1941
- Track
  - 2013 boys long jump, Donald Gaze,
  - 2014 girls team, girls 4×200 meters relay, girls 400 meters, Janie O'Connor
  - 2015 girls team, girls 100 meters and 400 meters, Janie O'Connor

== See also ==
- List of Louisiana high school athletic districts
