= Korey Lindsey =

American football player and coach (born 1989)

Central HS (LA)
- Title: Co-defensive coordinator & defensive backs coach

Personal information
- Born: February 3, 1989 (age 37); Baton Rouge, Louisiana, U.S.
- Listed height: 5 ft 10 in (1.78 m)
- Listed weight: 194 lb (88 kg)

Career information
- High school: Scotlandville (Baton Rouge)
- College: Southern Illinois
- NFL draft: 2011: 7th round, 207th overall pick

Career history

Playing
- Cincinnati Bengals (2011)*; Arizona Cardinals (2011); Indianapolis Colts (2012); Jacksonville Jaguars (2012)*; Washington Redskins (2012–2013)*; New Orleans Saints (2013)*; Dallas Cowboys (2014)*
- * Offseason or practice squad member only

Coaching
- Southern Illinois (2018) Assistant coach; Pittsburg State (2019) Cornerbacks coach; Liberty Magnet HS (LA) (2022–2023) Head coach; Central HS (LA) (2024–present) Co-defensive coordinator & defensive backs coach

Awards and highlights
- 2× All-American (2009, 2010); Third-team All-American (2008); 3× All-MVFC (2008, 2009, 2010)
- Stats at Pro Football Reference

Korey Lindsey (born February 3, 1989) is an American football coach and former cornerback. He played for the Arizona Cardinals, Indianapolis Colts, Jacksonville Jaguars and Washington Redskins. He was drafted 207th overall by the Cincinnati Bengals in the 2011 NFL draft. He played college football at Southern Illinois University.

== Early life ==
Lindsey attended Scotlandville Magnet High School in Baton Rouge, Louisiana, where he played wide receiver and defensive back. He Earned All-District honors twice as a wide receiver, twice as a defensive back and was a Two-time All-Metro Baton Rouge first-team (2005, 2006).

During his senior year on defense he recorded 76 tackles, four interceptions, two fumble recoveries, 17 pass breakups, one forced fumble and one interception returned for a touchdown. At wide receiver he gained 1,117 all-purpose yards, averaging 27.6 yards on kickoff returns and 18.9 yards on punt returns.

He was also a competed in baseball and track.

== College career ==
Lindsey accepted a football scholarship from Southern Illinois University. He played in every game during his freshman season, notching 19 tackles and one interception in 14 games. As a sophomore, he recorded six interceptions, fifth most in school history.

As a senior, he became just the third player in school history to garner First-team All-America accolades in back-to-back seasons and the fifth to be named First-team All-Conference three times. He was also named team captain and was a Buck Buchanan Award finalist. He had 41 tackles, 2.5 tackles for a loss, one interception and tied for third in the MVFC with seven pass breakups.

He finished his college career ranked third All-time in school history with 14 interceptions, tied for ninth with 16 pass breakups and had 36 consecutive starts. He also recorded 162 tackles (6 for loss), one forced fumble and a half sack. In 2013, he was named to the SIU All-Century football team.

== Professional career ==
Pre-draft measurables
Height	Weight	40-yard dash	20-yard shuttle	Three-cone drill	Bench press
5 ft 10 1/8 in (1.78 m)	194 lb (88 kg)	4.56 s	4.33 s	7.11 s	10 reps
All values from Pro Day

=== Cincinnati Bengals ===
Lindsey was selected by the Cincinnati Bengals in the 7th round (207th overall) of the 2011 NFL draft. He agreed to a rookie deal on July 29. He was released during final preseason roster cutdowns on September 3.

=== Arizona Cardinals ===
On September 4, 2011, Lindsey was claimed off waivers by the Arizona Cardinals. He was released on October 4. He was re-signed to the practice squad on October 5. He was promoted to the active roster on January 2, 2012. He was cut on May 30.

=== Indianapolis Colts ===
On May 31, 2012, he was claimed off of waivers by the Indianapolis Colts. He was placed on the injured reserve list with a concussion on August 31. He was released on September 25.

=== Jacksonville Jaguars ===
On November 14, 2012, he was signed to the Jacksonville Jaguars practice squad after Antonio Dennard was placed on the Practice Squad/Injured list. He was released on November 15.

=== Washington Redskins ===
On December 5, 2012, Lindsey was signed to the practice squad of the Washington Redskins. On January 7, 2013, he was promoted to the active roster. He was released on April 17.

=== New Orleans Saints ===
On May 13, 2013, he was signed by the New Orleans Saints. He was released on August 31.

=== Dallas Cowboys ===
On August 6, 2014, he was signed as a free agent by the Dallas Cowboys. He was waived injured with a hand injury on August 14. He was placed on the injured reserve list on August 15. He was released on August 18.

== Coaching career ==
Lindsey was an assistant coach at Southern Illinois in 2018 and a graduate assistant at Southwest Minnesota State in spring 2019.

In 2019, Lindsey was hired as the cornerbacks coach at Pittsburg State University.

He later accepted an assistant coaching position at Wayne State for the 2020 season but resigned after a few months to take care of his mother.

In 2022, Lindsey became the head football coach at Liberty Magnet High School in Baton Rouge, Louisiana.

== Head coaching record ==
Year	Team	Overall	Conference	Standing	Bowl/playoffs
Liberty Magnet Patriots () (2022–2023)
2022	Liberty Magnet	1–8	0–5	6th	
2023	Liberty Magnet	2–8	0–5	6th	
Liberty Magnet:		3–16	0–10		
Total:		3–16			
