= Monticello, Louisiana =

- Census-designated place
- Location in East Baton Rouge Parish and the state of Louisiana.
- Coordinates: 30°29′31″N 91°02′53″W
- Country: United States
- State: Louisiana
- Parish: East Baton Rouge

Area
  - Total: 2.39 sq mi (6.19 km^{2})
  - Land: 2.39 sq mi (6.19 km^{2})
  - Water: 0 sq mi (0.00 km^{2})
- Elevation: 49 ft (15 m)

Population (2020)
  - Total: 5,431
  - Density: 2,271.1/sq mi (876.88/km^{2})
- Time zone: UTC-6 (CST)
  - Summer (DST): UTC-5 (CDT)
- Area code: 225
- FIPS code: 22-51645

Monticello is a census-designated place (CDP) in East Baton Rouge Parish, Louisiana, United States. As of the 2020 census, Monticello had a population of 5,431. It is part of the Baton Rouge metropolitan statistical area.

== Geography ==
Monticello is located in east-central East Baton Rouge Parish at 30°29′31″N 91°2′53″W (30.491889, -91.048101). It is bordered to the west and south by Baton Rouge and to the northeast by Central. Greenwell Springs Road (Louisiana Highway 37) forms the northern border of the CDP. Downtown Baton Rouge is 9 miles (14 km) to the west.

According to the United States Census Bureau, the Monticello CDP has a total area of 2.4 square miles (6.2 km^{2}), all land.

== Demographics ==
Historical population
Census	Pop.	Note	%±
1990	4,710		—
2000	4,763		1.1%
2010	5,172		8.6%
2020	5,431		5.0%
U.S. Decennial Census; 1950 1960 1970 1980; 1990 2000 2010

Monticello first appeared as a census designated place the 1990 U.S. census.

Monticello CDP, Louisiana – Racial and ethnic composition Note: the US Census treats Hispanic/Latino as an ethnic category. This table excludes Latinos from the racial categories and assigns them to a separate category. Hispanics/Latinos may be of any race.
Race / Ethnicity (NH = Non-Hispanic)	Pop 2000	Pop 2010	Pop 2020	% 2000	% 2010	% 2020
White alone (NH)	1,576	691	411	33.09%	13.36%	7.57%
Black or African American alone (NH)	3,036	4,295	4,724	63.74%	83.04%	86.98%
Native American or Alaska Native alone (NH)	8	10	10	0.17%	0.19%	0.18%
Asian alone (NH)	47	50	41	0.99%	0.97%	0.75%
Native Hawaiian or Pacific Islander alone (NH)	3	0	0	0.06%	0.00%	0.00%
Other Race alone (NH)	6	1	9	0.13%	0.02%	0.17%
Mixed race or Multiracial (NH)	24	40	93	0.50%	0.77%	1.71%
Hispanic or Latino (any race)	63	85	143	1.32%	1.64%	2.63%
Total	4,763	5,172	5,431	100.00%	100.00%	100.00%

As of the 2020 United States census, there were 5,431 people, 1,747 households, and 1,192 families residing in the CDP.

As of the census of 2000, there were 4,763 people, 1,630 households, and 1,334 families residing in the CDP. The population density was 2,006.2 inhabitants per square mile (774.6/km^{2}). There were 1,670 housing units at an average density of 703.4 per square mile (271.6/km^{2}). The racial makeup of the CDP was 34.03% White, 63.85% African American, 0.23% Native American, 0.99% Asian, 0.06% Pacific Islander, 0.29% from other races, and 0.55% from two or more races. Hispanic or Latino of any race were 1.32% of the population.

There were 1,630 households, out of which 47.2% had children under the age of 18 living with them, 62.4% were married couples living together, 15.5% had a female householder with no husband present, and 18.1% were non-families. 16.0% of all households were made up of individuals, and 3.9% had someone living alone who was 65 years of age or older. The average household size was 2.92 and the average family size was 3.27.

In the CDP, the population was spread out, with 31.5% under the age of 18, 7.9% from 18 to 24, 32.6% from 25 to 44, 21.7% from 45 to 64, and 6.3% who were 65 years of age or older. The median age was 32 years. For every 100 females, there were 91.3 males. For every 100 females age 18 and over, there were 84.2 males.

The median income for a household in the CDP was $46,707, and the median income for a family was $49,464. Males had a median income of $38,250 versus $25,915 for females. The per capita income for the CDP was $17,524. About 4.6% of families and 5.1% of the population were below the poverty line, including 7.3% of those under age 18 and 2.7% of those age 65 or over.

== Education ==
East Baton Rouge Parish Public Schools serves Monticello. Residents are zoned to Greenbrier Elementary School in Monticello, Park Forest Middle School, and Belaire High School.

East Baton Rouge Parish Library operates the Greenwell Springs Road Regional Library in Monticello. The 26,672-square-foot (2,477.9 m^{2}) facility opened in 1997. Designed by Cockfield - Jackson Architects, LLC., it was the third library in the parish to be built with property tax funds.
