= Brownfields, Louisiana =

- Census-designated place
- Location in East Baton Rouge Parish and the state of Louisiana.
- Coordinates: 30°33′0″N 91°7′22″W
- Country: United States
- State: Louisiana
- Parish: East Baton Rouge

Area
  - Total: 4.15 sq mi (10.74 km^{2})
  - Land: 4.14 sq mi (10.73 km^{2})
  - Water: 0.0039 sq mi (0.01 km^{2})
- Elevation: 62 ft (19 m)

Population (2020)
  - Total: 5,145
  - Density: 1,242/sq mi (479.6/km^{2})
- Time zone: UTC-6 (CST)
  - Summer (DST): UTC-5 (CDT)
- Area code: 225
- FIPS code: 22-10145

Brownfields is an unincorporated area and census-designated place (CDP) in East Baton Rouge Parish, Louisiana, United States. As of the 2020 census, Brownfields had a population of 5,145. It is part of the Baton Rouge metropolitan statistical area.

== Geography ==
Brownfields is located north of the center of East Baton Rouge Parish and is bordered to the north by the city of Baker, to the east by Central, and to the southwest by Baton Rouge. Brownfields is 10 miles (16 km) northeast of downtown Baton Rouge. The border with Central is formed by the Comite River, a south-flowing tributary of the Amite River.

According to the United States Census Bureau, the Brownfields CDP has a total area of 4.1 square miles (10.7 km^{2}), of which 0.01 square miles (0.02 km^{2}), or 0.15%, is water.

== Demographics ==
Historical population
Census	Pop.	Note	%±
1990	5,229		—
2000	5,222		−0.1%
2010	5,401		3.4%
2020	5,145		−4.7%
U.S. Decennial Census; 1950 1960 1970 1980; 1990 2000 2010

Brownfields first appeared as a census designated place the 1990 U.S. census.

Brownfields CDP, Louisiana – Racial and ethnic composition Note: the US Census treats Hispanic/Latino as an ethnic category. This table excludes Latinos from the racial categories and assigns them to a separate category. Hispanics/Latinos may be of any race.
Race / Ethnicity (NH = Non-Hispanic)	Pop 2000	Pop 2010	Pop 2020	% 2000	% 2010	% 2020
White alone (NH)	2,429	1,326	862	46.51%	24.55%	16.75%
Black or African American alone (NH)	2,698	3,893	4,065	51.67%	72.08%	79.01%
Native American or Alaska Native alone (NH)	8	16	6	0.15%	0.30%	0.12%
Asian alone (NH)	24	35	12	0.46%	0.65%	0.23%
Native Hawaiian or Pacific Islander alone (NH)	0	0	0	0.00%	0.00%	0.00%
Other race alone (NH)	5	7	6	0.10%	0.13%	0.12%
Mixed race or Multiracial (NH)	28	49	115	0.54%	0.91%	2.24%
Hispanic or Latino (any race)	30	75	79	0.57%	1.39%	1.54%
Total	5,222	5,401	5,145	100.00%	100.00%	100.00%

As of the 2020 United States census, there were 5,145 people, 2,027 households, and 1,337 families residing in the CDP.

As of the census of 2000, there were 5,222 people, 1,884 households, and 1,428 families residing in the CDP. The population density was 1,265.3 inhabitants per square mile (488.5/km^{2}). There were 2,024 housing units at an average density of 490.4 per square mile (189.3/km^{2}). The racial makeup of the CDP was 46.80% White, 51.82% African American, 0.15% Native American, 0.46% Asian, 0.11% from other races, and 0.65% from two or more races. Hispanic or Latino of any race were 0.57% of the population.

There were 1,884 households, out of which 35.1% had children under the age of 18 living with them, 56.2% were married couples living together, 16.1% had a female householder with no husband present, and 24.2% were non-families. 21.1% of all households were made up of individuals, and 8.7% had someone living alone who was 65 years of age or older. The average household size was 2.69 and the average family size was 3.14.

In the CDP, the population was spread out, with 25.9% under the age of 18, 9.2% from 18 to 24, 26.4% from 25 to 44, 25.1% from 45 to 64, and 13.4% who were 65 years of age or older. The median age was 38 years. For every 100 females, there were 89.6 males. For every 100 females age 18 and over, there were 86.4 males.

The median income for a household in the CDP was $38,103, and the median income for a family was $41,943. Males had a median income of $34,135 versus $22,279 for females. The per capita income for the CDP was $15,894. About 11.6% of families and 10.2% of the population were below the poverty line, including 8.8% of those under age 18 and 8.8% of those age 65 or over.

== Education ==
East Baton Rouge Parish Public Schools serves one portion of Brownfields. Most residents of the EBR section are zoned to Brownfields Elementary School, while a few are zoned to Sharon Hills Elementary School. For middle school students in the EBR schools section are divided between Northeast Middle School (Attendance Zone B) and Crestworth Middle School; the latter is operated by the Recovery School District of Louisiana, and the district-operated Park Forest Middle School is the alternate for the Crestworth zone. For senior high school students in the EBR schools section are divided between Northeast High School (Attendance Zone B) and Scotlandville High School.

Another portion of Brownfields is within the Central Community School System. Residents of that section are assigned to Bellingrath Hills School (grades PK-K), Tanglewood Elementary School (grades 1–2), Central Intermediate School (grades 3–5), Central Middle School (grades 6–8), Central High School (grades 9–12), all in Central.

=== History of schools ===
Prior to 2007 all residents were in EBR parish schools; Central schools left the EBR district that year.

Brownfields Elementary School served most of the community, while Sharon Hills Elementary served a portion. At that time one section of Brownfields was assigned to Central Middle, then an EBR parish-controlled school; while others were zoned to Crestworth Middle School, then controlled by EBR. At that time one section was assigned to Central High, then an EBR parish-controlled school; while others were zoned to Northeast High and Scotlandville High.
