= Central Community Schools =

Central Community Schools may refer to:

- Central Community School District of Elkader, Iowa
- Central Community School System of Central, Louisiana
