= Glen Oaks High School =

Location
- 6650 Cedar Grove Dr. Baton Rouge, Louisiana 70812; United States; 30.512939°N 91.121899°W

Information
- Type: Public Magnet
- Established: 1960
- School district: East Baton Rouge Parish Public Schools
- Principal: Eric Randall
- Faculty: 64.64 (FTE)
- Grades: 6–12
- Enrollment: 687 (2023-2024)
- Student to teacher ratio: 10.63
- Campus type: Urban
- Colors: Red and Black
- Mascot: Panther
- Nickname: Panthers
- Rival: Scotlandville Hornets; Baker Buffaloes; Istrouma Indians
- Yearbook: Panther
- Website: ebrschools.org/schools/glenoakshigh/

Glen Oaks High School (GOHS) is located in Merrydale, unincorporated East Baton Rouge Parish, Louisiana, United States, near the city of Baton Rouge. The school, opened in 1960, is part of East Baton Rouge Parish Public Schools. The current principal is Eric Randall.

== Feeder patterns ==
Glen Oaks serves Merrydale and sections of Baton Rouge.

The following elementary schools feed into Glen Oaks:

- Glen Oaks Park
- Lanier
- Merrydale
- Claiborne (partial)
- Sharon Hills (partial)
- Forest Heights Academy of Excellence
- Howell Park & Brookstown

The following middle schools feed into Glen Oaks:

- Glen Oaks

== School uniforms ==
All student must wear uniforms: 9th Grade: Red or Black, 10-12th Grade: Red or Black

== Athletics ==
The Glen Oaks High Panthers compete in LHSAA Class 3A athletics. The school's mascot is the Panther and school colors are red, black, and white.

=== Championships ===
The school is best known for its boys and girls basketball programs, as well as their track and field programs. The basketball programs have won multiple state championships and tournament titles since the 1990s and the track and field teams have won state titles starting in the 2000s.

== Band ==
GOHS panther marching band is one of the largest student organizations on campus. The band and the Pantherettes have a long tradition of winning "Battle of the Bands" in South Louisiana and performing at parades and other special events in the region.

== Notable alumni ==
- Gary Chambers, activist and 2022 U.S. Senate candidate
- Bob Didier, former MLB player (Atlanta Braves, Detroit Tigers, Boston Red Sox)
- Ryan Francis, former USC point guard;
- Steven Jyles, former starting quarterback for the University of Louisiana at Monroe and currently of the Saskatchewan Roughriders
- Alonzo Knox, businessman and member of the Louisiana House of Representatives
- Gabe Northern, former NFL defensive end & linebacker with the Buffalo Bills and Minnesota Vikings
- Heishma Northern, former Southern University defensive back and current head coach at Prairie View A&M University; brother of Gabe Northern
- Marcus Randall, former LSU quarterback; brother of former Glen Oaks & Southern University quarterback Eric Randall
- Ted White, current Howard University Head Football Coach, and former NFL Quarterback
