= Forest Heights =

Forest Heights could refer to:

Canada

- Forest Heights, Edmonton, Alberta
- Forest Heights, Ontario, a neighbourhood in Kitchener, Ontario
  - Forest Heights Collegiate Institute, a high school in Kitchener, Ontario

United States

- Forest Heights (Knoxville, Tennessee)
- Forest Heights, Maryland
- Forest Heights Middle School, Little Rock, Arkansas
- Forest Heights Academy of Excellence, East Baton Rouge Parish, Louisiana
- Forest Heights, Texas
