= Inniswold, Louisiana =

- Neighborhood of St. George; Former census designated place
- Location in East Baton Rouge Parish and the state of Louisiana.
- Coordinates: 30°24′02″N 91°04′18″W
- Country: United States
- State: Louisiana
- Parish: East Baton Rouge

Area
  - Total: 2.24 sq mi (5.80 km^{2})
  - Land: 2.24 sq mi (5.80 km^{2})
  - Water: 0 sq mi (0.00 km^{2})
- Elevation: 30 ft (9.1 m)

Population (2020)
  - Total: 5,987
  - Density: 2,673.1/sq mi (1,032.09/km^{2})
- Time zone: UTC-6 (CST)
  - Summer (DST): UTC-5 (CDT)
- Area code: 225
- FIPS code: 22-37270

Inniswold is a neighborhood of St. George and former census designated place in East Baton Rouge Parish, Louisiana, United States. The population was 6,180 at the 2010 census, up from 4,944 in 2000. In 2020, its population was 5,987. It is part of the Baton Rouge metropolitan statistical area.

It is in the newly incorporated City of St. George.

== Geography ==
Inniswold is located in southern East Baton Rouge Parish at 30°24′2″N 91°4′18″W (30.400658, -91.071652). It is bordered to the west, across Bluebonnet Road, by Westminster. Jefferson Highway (Louisiana Highway 73) forms the northern border, Siegen Lane the eastern border, and Interstate 10 the southern border. Access from Interstate 10 is from Exits 162 and 163. The center of Baton Rouge is 8 miles (13 km) to the northwest.

According to the United States Census Bureau, the Inniswold CDP has a total area of 2.2 square miles (5.8 km^{2}), all land.

== Demographics ==
Historical population
Census	Pop.	Note	%±
1990	3,474		—
2000	4,944		42.3%
2010	6,180		25.0%
2020	5,987		−3.1%
U.S. Decennial Census; 1960 1970 1980; 1990 2000 2010

Inniswold was first listed as a census designated place in the 1990 U.S. census. It was deleted after the 2020 U.S. census after being absorbed into the newly formed city of St. George.

Inniswold, Louisiana – Racial and ethnic composition Note: the US Census treats Hispanic/Latino as an ethnic category. This table excludes Latinos from the racial categories and assigns them to a separate category. Hispanics/Latinos may be of any race.
Race / Ethnicity (NH = Non-Hispanic)	Pop 2000	Pop 2010	Pop 2020	% 2000	% 2010	% 2020
White alone (NH)	3,924	4,505	3,940	79.37%	72.90%	65.81%
Black or African American alone (NH)	752	1,159	1,230	15.21%	18.75%	20.54%
Native American or Alaska Native alone (NH)	7	11	3	0.14%	0.18%	0.05%
Asian alone (NH)	112	201	286	2.27%	3.25%	4.78%
Native Hawaiian or Pacific Islander alone (NH)	0	1	2	0.00%	0.02%	0.03%
Other race alone (NH)	14	11	23	0.28%	0.18%	0.38%
Mixed race or Multiracial (NH)	107	87	182	0.57%	1.41%	3.04%
Hispanic or Latino (any race)	107	205	321	2.16%	3.32%	5.36%
Total	4,944	6,180	5,987	100.00%	100.00%	100.00%

As of the 2020 United States census, there were 5,987 people, 2,230 households, and 1,384 families residing in the CDP.

As of the census of 2000, there were 4,944 people, 2,060 households, and 1,347 families residing in the CDP. The population density was 2,272.7 inhabitants per square mile (877.5/km^{2}). There were 2,158 housing units at an average density of 992.0 per square mile (383.0/km^{2}). The racial makeup of the CDP was 80.48% White, 15.25% African American, 0.14% Native American, 2.31% Asian, 1.09% from other races, and 0.73% from two or more races. Hispanic or Latino of any race were 2.16% of the population.

There were 2,060 households, out of which 32.7% had children under the age of 18 living with them, 49.3% were married couples living together, 13.1% had a female householder with no husband present, and 34.6% were non-families. 28.0% of all households were made up of individuals, and 6.1% had someone living alone who was 65 years of age or older. The average household size was 2.40 and the average family size was 2.97.

In the CDP, the population was spread out, with 25.6% under the age of 18, 10.9% from 18 to 24, 33.0% from 25 to 44, 21.2% from 45 to 64, and 9.3% who were 65 years of age or older. The median age was 32 years. For every 100 females, there were 88.9 males. For every 100 females age 18 and over, there were 85.2 males.

The median income for a household in the CDP was $43,322, and the median income for a family was $50,306. Males had a median income of $48,672 versus $29,592 for females. The per capita income for the CDP was $23,029. About 6.4% of families and 7.9% of the population were below the poverty line, including 8.0% of those under age 18 and 2.8% of those age 65 or over.

In 2013, Inniswold was included in the St. George incorporation petition, a result of the citizens of the unincorporated areas being declined the ability to form their own independent school district by the East Baton Rouge Parish School Board.

== Education ==
East Baton Rouge Parish Public Schools serves Inniswold.

Schools with attendance boundaries including the community are as follows: Jefferson Terrace Elementary School in Inniswold serves almost all of the community. A single strip to the west is served by Westminster Elementary School in Westminster. Most of the area is served by Westdale Middle School, while Woodlawn Middle School serves a section in the east. Most residents are served by Tara High School while a few areas to the east are served by Woodlawn High School.
