= East Baton Rouge Laboratory Academy =

Location
- 3730 Winbourne Avenue; Baton Rouge, Louisiana 70805; United States
- 30.477°N 91.152°W

Information
- Established: 2007
- Closed: 2013
- School district: East Baton Rouge Parish Public Schools
- Principal: Paul Jackson, December 2011-2012 Molly Williams, July 2009-Dec 2011 David Zielinski, 2007-2009
- Grades: 9-12
- Enrollment: max of 100 students per grade level
- Average class size: 20
- Colors: royal blue, black, white
- Slogan: E.L.A. (Excellence In Responsibility, Leaders in Respect, Absolutely Motivated)
- Athletics: basketball, track, bowling
- Mascot: Pelicans
- Nickname: Dat Lab
- Website: http://ebrlab.ebrschools.org/

East Baton Rouge Laboratory Academy, also known as EBR Lab, was a high school in Baton Rouge, Louisiana, United States. Established in 2007 and closed 2013, it offered a college preparatory program with smaller class sizes.

== Historia ==
La East Baton Rouge Laboratory Academy fue una de las dos primeras escuelas autónomas del sistema escolar de East Baton Rouge Parish. Este tipo de institución contaba con un grado de flexibilidad superior al de las escuelas tradicionales, aunque sin alcanzar la autonomía propia de una escuela chárter.

La institución abrió sus puertas en agosto de 2007. Su primera promoción de graduados completó los estudios en 2011.

El centro educativo cesó sus actividades en 2013.

== Curriculum ==
EBR Lab offered a rigorous college preparatory curriculum.

== Extracurricular activities ==
The school's athletic program included boys and girls basketball, boys and girls track and field, cross country, girls volleyball, bowling, and golf
