= Live Oak High School =

Live Oak High School may refer to:

- Live Oak High School (Morgan Hill, California), a public school
- Live Oak High School (Antioch, California), a public school
- Live Oak High School (Live Oak, California), a public school
- Live Oak High School (Louisiana), a public school
