= Gabe Northern =

American football player and coach (born 1974)

No. 99, 90
- Positions: Linebacker, defensive end

Personal information
- Born: June 8, 1974 (age 52); Baton Rouge, Louisiana, U.S.
- Listed height: 6 ft 2 in (1.88 m)
- Listed weight: 240 lb (109 kg)

Career information
- High school: Glen Oaks (Merrydale, Louisiana)
- College: LSU
- NFL draft: 1996: 2nd round, 53rd overall pick

Career history

Playing
- Buffalo Bills (1996–1999); Pittsburgh Steelers (2000)*; Minnesota Vikings (2000)
- * Offseason or practice squad member only

Coaching
- Grambling State (2001–2003) Defensive line coach; Prairie View A&M (2011–2012, 2014) Defensive line coach & special teams coordinator

Awards and highlights
- 2× First-team All-SEC (1994, 1995)

Career NFL statistics
- Tackles: 122
- Sacks: 10.5
- Interceptions: 1
- Stats at Pro Football Reference

Gabriel O'Kara Northern (born June 8, 1974) is an American former professional football player who was a linebacker and defensive end for five seasons with the Buffalo Bills and Minnesota Vikings of the National Football League (NFL). He served as defensive line coach at Prairie View A&M from 2011 to 2012 and 2014, and in the same position at Grambling State from 2001 to 2003.

Northern was selected in the second round of the 1996 NFL draft with the 53rd overall pick. As a rookie in 1996, he finished the year with five sacks and 19 tackles. In his second season, he started one game and recorded 24 tackles. He made the switch to outside linebacker in 1998 and started 16 games, finishing with two sacks, one interception, one forced fumble, and 32 tackles. In 1999, he again started 16 games and finished with 3.5 sacks, two forced fumbles, one fumble recovery, and 35 tackles.
