= Aubin, Louisiana =

Unincorporated community in Louisiana

- Unincorporated community
- Location within Louisiana Location within the United States
- Coordinates: 30°25′10″N 91°03′47″W
- Country: United States
- State: Louisiana
- Parish: East Baton Rouge
- Elevation: 43 ft (13 m)
- Time zone: UTC-6 (Central (CST))
  - Summer (DST): UTC-5 (CDT)
- ZIP code: 70807
- Area code: 225
- GNIS feature ID: 542941
- FIPS code: 22-03445

Aubin is an unincorporated community in East Baton Rouge Parish, Louisiana, United States. The community is located 4 miles (6.4 kilometres) to the southeast of Baton Rouge and less than 2 miles (3.2 kilometres) northeast of Westminster and 7 miles (11 kilometres) east of the Mississippi River.
