= Donnie Lewis =

American football player (born 1996)

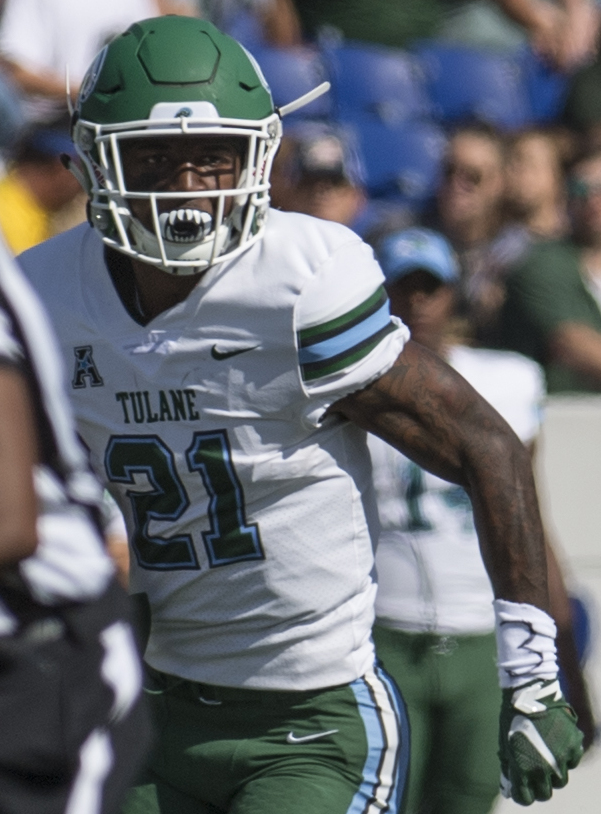
- Lewis with the Tulane Green Wave in 2017

Fishers Freight
- Position: Cornerback
- Roster status: Active

Personal information
- Born: July 21, 1996 (age 30); Baton Rouge, Louisiana, U.S.
- Listed height: 6 ft 0 in (1.83 m)
- Listed weight: 190 lb (86 kg)

Career information
- High school: Central (Central, Louisiana)
- College: Tulane (2014–2018)
- NFL draft: 2019: 7th round, 221st overall pick

Career history
- Cleveland Browns (2019–2020)*; Cincinnati Bengals (2020–2021)*; Denver Broncos (2022)*; Birmingham Stallions (2023); Edmonton Elks (2024)*; Massachusetts Pirates (2025); Fishers Freight (2026–present)
- * Offseason or practice squad member only
- Stats at Pro Football Reference

Donnie Lewis Jr. (born July 21, 1996) is an American professional football cornerback for the Fishers Freight of the Indoor Football League (IFL). He played college football for the Tulane Green Wave.

== Professional career ==
=== Cleveland Browns ===
Lewis was selected by the Cleveland Browns with the 221st overall pick in the seventh round of the 2019 NFL draft. He signed his rookie contract with the Browns on May 2, 2019. The Browns waived Lewis on August 31, 2019. The Browns re-signed Lewis to their practice squad on September 7, 2019. Lewis was released by the Browns on September 12, 2019. The Browns re-signed Lewis to their practice squad a second time on September 20, 2019.

The Browns signed Lewis to their reserve/futures list on December 30, 2019. Lewis was waived by the Browns on September 3, 2020.

=== Cincinnati Bengals ===
On November 18, 2020, Lewis was signed to the Cincinnati Bengals practice squad. He signed a reserve/future contract on January 4, 2021. He was waived/injured on August 23, 2021 and placed on injured reserve. He was released on September 14.

=== Denver Broncos ===
On April 27, 2022, Lewis was signed by the Denver Broncos. He was waived/injured on August 29 and placed on injured reserve. He was released from injured reserve on September 1.

=== Birmingham Stallions ===
Lewis signed with the Birmingham Stallions of the United States Football League on January 14, 2023. He was released on June 6.

=== Edmonton Elks ===
Lewis was signed by the Edmonton Elks of the Canadian Football League on January 10, 2024. He was released on June 3, 2024.
