= Eric Randall =

American football player

Profile
- Position: Quarterback

Career information
- High school: Glen Oaks
- College: Southern (1992–1995)

Awards and highlights
- 2× SWAC Champion; 2010 Southern Sports Hall of Fame inductee

Eric Randall (born c. 1974) was a quarterback for Southern University who led the team to a Black College National Championship in 1995. In his four seasons with Southern (1992 to 1995), the team won the Southwestern Athletic Conference championship twice. Randall attended Glen Oaks High School in Baton Rouge, Louisiana where he is the current principal. He is the brother of former LSU quarterback Marcus Randall, who signed as a linebacker with the Green Bay Packers. Randall is married to the former Angela Washington and has four children. In May 2010, he was inducted into Southern's Sports Hall of Fame.
