= Dallas Thomas =

American football player (born 1989)

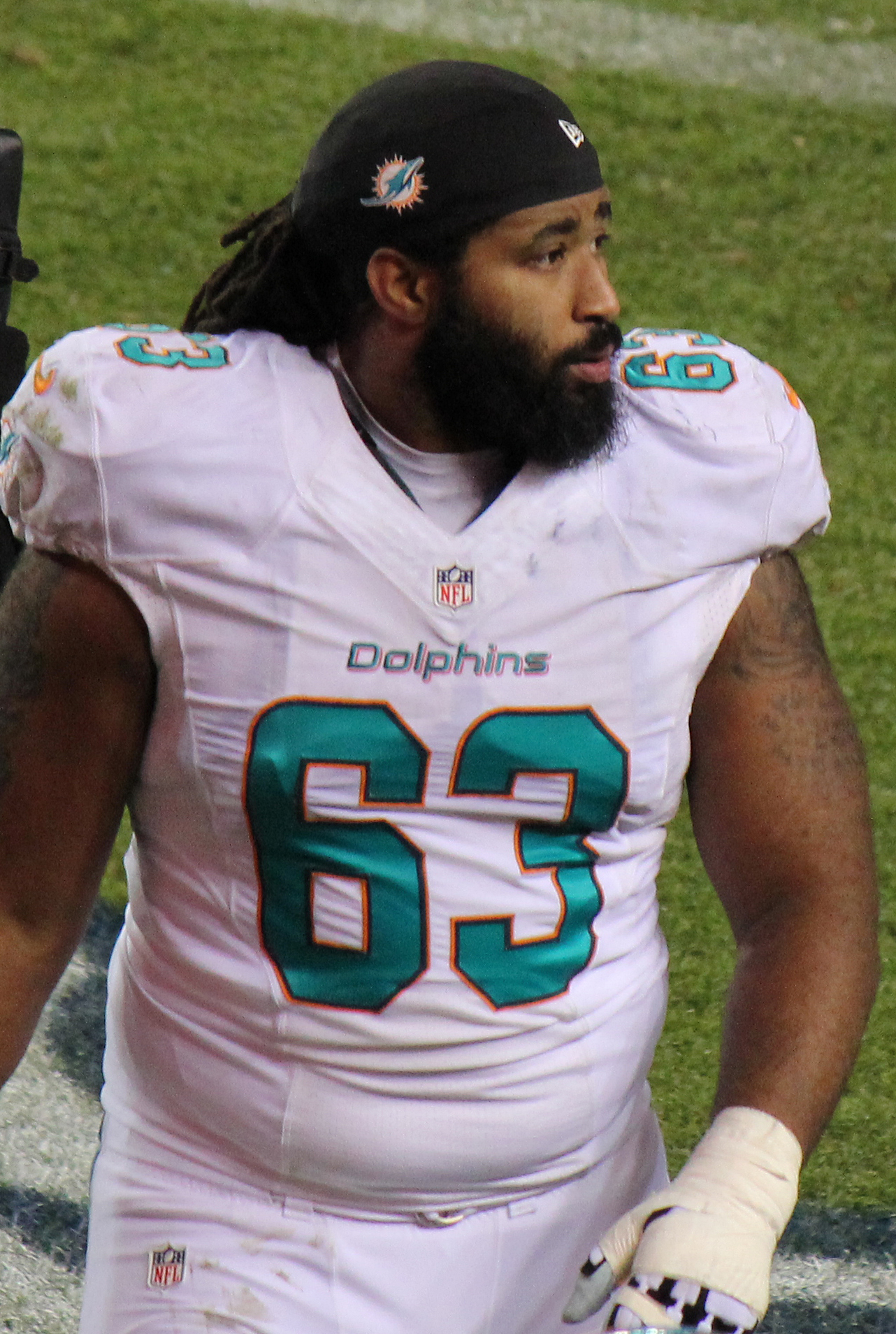
- Thomas with the Miami Dolphins in 2014

No. 63, 70
- Position: Guard

Personal information
- Born: October 30, 1989 (age 37); Baton Rouge, Louisiana, U.S.
- Listed height: 6 ft 5 in (1.96 m)
- Listed weight: 306 lb (139 kg)

Career information
- High school: Scotlandville Magnet (Baton Rouge)
- College: Tennessee
- NFL draft: 2013: 3rd round, 77th overall pick

Career history
- Miami Dolphins (2013–2016); Philadelphia Eagles (2017)*; Memphis Express (2019)
- * Offseason or practice squad member only

Awards and highlights
- Second-team All-SEC (2012)

Career NFL statistics
- Games played: 37
- Games started: 26
- Stats at Pro Football Reference

Dallas Treymell Thomas (born October 30, 1989) is an American former professional football player who was a guard in the National Football League (NFL). He was selected by the Miami Dolphins in the third round of the 2013 NFL draft. He played college football for the Tennessee Volunteers.

== Early life ==
Thomas was born in Baton Rouge, Louisiana. While attending Scotlandville Magnet High School in Baton Rouge, he played high school football for the Scotlandville Hornets.

== College career ==
Thomas attended the University of Tennessee, where he played for the Tennessee Volunteers football team from 2008 to 2012. During his college career, he started 37 of 50 games in which he appeared at offensive tackle and guard. As a senior in 2012, he received third-team All-American honors from CBSSports.com, and was a second-team All-Southeastern Conference (SEC) selection.

== Professional career ==
=== Miami Dolphins ===
The Miami Dolphins selected Thomas in the third round (77th overall) of the 2013 NFL draft.

On October 9, 2016, Thomas started at left guard after Billy Turner was moved to left tackle since both the starting left tackle, Branden Albert, and the backup left tackle, Laremy Tunsil, both missed the game due to illness and injury, respectively. Thomas and Turner were both released two days later after they had a disastrous performance during the 30–17 loss to the Tennessee Titans.

=== Philadelphia Eagles ===
On January 18, 2017, Thomas signed a reserve/future contract with the Eagles. He was waived on September 2, 2017.

=== Memphis Express ===
In 2018, Thomas signed with the Memphis Express of the AAF for the 2019 season. The league ceased operations in April 2019.

=== St. Louis Battlehawks ===
In October 2019, Thomas was selected by the St. Louis BattleHawks as their 19th pick in the third round of the Offensive Line phase of the 2020 XFL draft. On April 10, 2020, the XFL league suspended operations, thus cancelling Thomas' contract.
