= Eugene Daniel =

American football player (born 1961)

No. 38, 30
- Position: Cornerback

Personal information
- Born: May 4, 1961 (age 65); Baton Rouge, Louisiana, U.S.
- Listed height: 5 ft 11 in (1.80 m)
- Listed weight: 188 lb (85 kg)

Career information
- High school: Robert E. Lee (Baton Rouge)
- College: LSU
- NFL draft: 1984: 8th round, 205th overall pick

Career history
- Indianapolis Colts (1984–1996); Baltimore Ravens (1997)

Career NFL statistics
- Tackles: 762
- Interceptions: 38
- Touchdowns: 4
- Stats at Pro Football Reference

Eugene Daniel Jr. (born May 4, 1961) is an American former professional football player who was a cornerback for 14 seasons in the National Football League (NFL) with the Indianapolis Colts and Baltimore Ravens from 1984 to 1997. He played college football for the LSU Tigers and was selected by the Colts in the eighth round of the 1984 NFL draft. In 1985, Daniel tied Albert Lewis of the Kansas City Chiefs for the AFC lead in interceptions, with 8. In 1995, Daniel recorded the longest interception return in Colts history, scoring on a 97-yard interception against the New York Jets. During his 12 years with the Indianapolis Colts, Daniel was a fan favorite and held many franchise longevity records since surpassed by quarterback Peyton Manning.
