= Ted White (gridiron football) =

American football player and coach (born 1976)

Howard Bison
- Title: Head coach

Personal information
- Born: May 29, 1976 (age 50); Baton Rouge, Louisiana, U.S.
- Listed height: 6 ft 2 in (1.88 m)
- Listed weight: 226 lb (103 kg)

Career information
- High school: Glen Oaks (Baton Rouge)
- College: Howard (1995–1998)
- NFL draft: 1998: undrafted

Career history

Playing
- Kansas City Chiefs (1999); Frankfurt Galaxy (2000); Tampa Bay Buccaneers (2000)*; Jacksonville Jaguars (2001)*; Oakland Raiders (2002)*; Barcelona Dragons (2002); Montreal Alouettes (2003–2005)
- * Offseason or practice squad member only

Coaching
- Texas Southern (2006–2008) Quarterbacks coach & wide receivers coach; Southern (2010) Offensive coordinator & quarterbacks coach; Howard (2011–2015) Assistant head coach, offensive coordinator & quarterbacks coach; Arkansas–Pine Bluff (2016–2017) Assistant head coach, offensive coordinator & quarterbacks coach; Prairie View A&M (2018–2019) Offensive coordinator & quarterbacks coach; DC Defenders (2020) Quarterbacks coach; Maryland (2021) Offensive quality control coach; Houston Texans (2022) Offensive assistant & quarterbacks coach; UCLA (2024) Quarterbacks coach; Maryland (2025) Offensive analyst; Howard (2026–present) Head coach

Awards and highlights
- MEAC Offensive player of the year (1996); First-team All-MEAC (1996)

Career NFLE + CFL statistics
- Passing attempts: 413
- Passing completions: 217
- Completion percentage: 52.5
- TD–INT: 20–19
- Passing yards: 2,568

Tederal Duralle White (born May 29, 1976) is an American football coach and former quarterback. Before coaching, White played for the Frankfurt Galaxy and Barcelona Dragons as part of NFL Europe in the early 2000s. From 2003 to 2005, White was the backup quarterback for the Montreal Alouettes in the Canadian Football League. With both leagues, White had a combined total of 2,568 passing yards, 20 touchdowns and 19 interceptions.

In college football, White started working as a positions coach for Texas Southern during the late 2000s. Throughout the 2010s, White continued to coach college football with Southern, Howard, Arkansas-Pine Bluff, and Prairie View A&M. He also was a coach for the DC Defenders in the XFL and Grambling State during the 2020s. White was inducted into the Mid-Eastern Athletic Conference Hall of Fame in 2010.

== Early life ==
White was born on May 29, 1976, in Baton Rouge, Louisiana. His parents separated when he was an infant. White was a basketball and football player while he attended Glen Oaks High School. With Glen Oaks, White and his team reached the semifinals of the Class 5A championship held by the Louisiana High School Athletic Association. After high school, he originally planned on going to Southern University but later decided to enroll in Howard University.

== College career ==
In 1995, White joined the Howard Bison football team as their quarterback while he was a redshirt. During the 1995 NCAA Division I-AA football season, White had a kidney injury in October 1995. He did not play for the remainder of the season and returned to the Bisons in 1996. At the end of the year, White and Howard defeated Southern at the 1996 Heritage Bowl. During the 1996–97 season, White and his team received the Black college football national championship after their ten wins and two losses.

During this season, White broke the Howard record for most career passing yards that was held by Jay Walker. For the MEAC, White had the most passing yards in 1996 and 1998. After leaving Howard University in 1998, White set Mid-Eastern Athletic Conference career records with 9,808 passing yards and 92 passing touchdowns. His career records in the MEAC have remained for over 20 years. As an NCAA I-AA football player, White held the season record for passing efficiency in 1996 with 176.2 points. By 2006, White was in the top-10 for most passing touchdowns and the top 25 for most passing yards for his career records.

== Professional career ==
White began his professional football career in the National Football League. In the late 1990s, White was signed with the Jacksonville Jaguars, Tampa Bay Buccaneers and Kansas City Chiefs but did not play any regular season games. He then moved on to NFL Europe to play for the Frankfurt Galaxy and Barcelona Dragons in the early 2000s. In the CFL, White was a backup quarterback for the Montreal Alouettes from 2003 to 2005. During his time with the Alouettes, White appeared in the 2004 CFL East Division Final game against the Toronto Argonauts after quarterback Anthony Calvillo was injured. After his final gridiron football season in 2005, White had a combined total of 2568 passing yards, 20 touchdowns and 19 interceptions.

== Coaching career ==
=== Early years ===
Outside of quarterbacking, White was a position coach for the Texas Southern Tigers football team from 2006 to 2008. He then became an offensive coordinator for the Southern Jaguars, Howard Bison, Arkansas-Pine Bluff Golden Lions and Prairie View A&M Panthers throughout the 2010s. While at Pine Bluff, White was the interim head coach in 2017 after the university decided to replace Monte Coleman with a new head coach for their football team.

=== DC Defenders ===
In 2019, White was named quarterbacks coach for the DC Defenders of the XFL. White was with the Defenders during the 2020 XFL season before the league folded that year.

=== Houston Texans ===
On February 21, 2022, White was hired as offensive assistant and quarterbacks coach for the Houston Texans. He had previously worked for the Grambling State Tigers football team as an offensive coordinator before joining the Texans.

== Head coaching record ==
Year	Team	Overall	Conference	Standing	Bowl/playoffs
Howard Bison (Mid-Eastern Athletic Conference) (2026–present)
2026	Howard	4–5	1–1		
Howard:		4–5	1–1		
Total:		4–4			

== Awards and personal life ==
White was named Most Valuable Player for the MEAC and the Heritage Bowl in 1996. That year, White was also named the Offensive Player of the Year for the MEAC. He became a member of the Mid-Eastern Athletic Conference Hall of Fame in 2010 and the Howard University Hall Of Fame in 2014. While playing football at Howard, White was nicknamed "Sweet Flight". White is married to Ladricca White and together they have a daughter.
