= Marcus Randall =

American football player (born 1982)

No. 51
- Position: Quarterback / safety / linebacker

Personal information
- Born: March 14, 1982 (age 44); Baton Rouge, Louisiana, U.S.
- Listed height: 6 ft 2 in (1.88 m)
- Listed weight: 219 lb (99 kg)

Career information
- High school: Glen Oaks (Baton Rouge)
- College: Louisiana State
- NFL draft: 2005: undrafted

Career history
- Tennessee Titans (2005); Green Bay Packers (2007)*; Team Arkansas (2008)*
- * Offseason or practice squad member only

Awards and highlights
- BCS national champion (2003)
- Stats at Pro Football Reference

Marcus Keith Randall (born March 14, 1982) is an American former professional football player. Randall played quarterback for LSU, Tennessee Titans and Green Bay Packers of the National Football League (NFL).

== College career ==
Randall came to LSU from nearby Glen Oaks High School in Baton Rouge, Louisiana. His brother, Eric Randall, had been a well-known quarterback in the area, leading Southern University to a Black College National Championship in 1995. In 2002, Randall became the starting quarterback halfway through the season, after starter Matt Mauck was lost for the year with a broken foot. In 2003, he saw limited action behind Mauck during LSU's run to a BCS National Championship. In 2004, he started the majority of LSU's games, but split time with redshirt freshman JaMarcus Russell. During his career at LSU, Randall threw for 2,845 yards, 18 touchdowns and 12 interceptions. He also threw the game-winning touchdown against Kentucky in 2002, now known as the "Bluegrass Miracle".

== Professional career ==
=== NFL ===
Randall was not selected in the 2005 NFL draft. However, he did sign as an undrafted free agent with the Titans, who converted him first to safety and later linebacker. Randall played the final three games of the 2005 season with the Titans and made three tackles. The Titans cut him on September 2, 2006.

The Green Bay Packers signed him on February 20, 2007 and then released him on June 8, 2007.

=== AAFL ===
Randall was selected in inaugural AAFL draft by Arkansas to play quarterback.
