= Merrydale, Louisiana =

- Census-designated place
- Location in East Baton Rouge Parish and the state of Louisiana.
- Coordinates: 30°30′15″N 91°06′58″W
- Country: United States
- State: Louisiana
- Parish: East Baton Rouge

Area
  - Total: 4.24 sq mi (10.99 km^{2})
  - Land: 4.24 sq mi (10.99 km^{2})
  - Water: 0 sq mi (0.00 km^{2})
- Elevation: 52 ft (16 m)

Population (2020)
  - Total: 9,227
  - Density: 2,174.5/sq mi (839.56/km^{2})
- Time zone: UTC-6 (CST)
  - Summer (DST): UTC-5 (CDT)
- Area code: 225
- FIPS code: 22-49940

Merrydale is an unincorporated area and census-designated place (CDP) in East Baton Rouge Parish, Louisiana, United States. As of the 2020 census, Merrydale had a population of 9,227. It is part of the Baton Rouge metropolitan statistical area.

== Geography ==
Merrydale is located in central East Baton Rouge Parish at 30°30′15″N 91°6′58″W (30.504289, -91.116195). It is bordered to the south and west by Baton Rouge. U.S. Route 190, the Airline Highway, forms part of the southwest border of the community, and Louisiana Highway 37 (Greenwell Springs Road) forms part of the southern boundary. Downtown Baton Rouge is 7 miles (11 km) to the southwest.

According to the United States Census Bureau, the Merrydale CDP has a total area of 4.2 square miles (11.0 km^{2}), all land.

== Demographics ==
Historical population
Census	Pop.	Note	%±
1990	10,395		—
2000	10,427		0.3%
2010	9,772		−6.3%
2020	9,227		−5.6%
U.S. Decennial Census; 1950 1960 1970 1980; 1990 2000 2010

Merrydale first appeared as a census designated place the 1990 U.S. census.

Merrydale CDP, Louisiana – Racial and ethnic composition Note: the US Census treats Hispanic/Latino as an ethnic category. This table excludes Latinos from the racial categories and assigns them to a separate category. Hispanics/Latinos may be of any race.
Race / Ethnicity (NH = Non-Hispanic)	Pop 2000	Pop 2010	Pop 2020	% 2000	% 2010	% 2020
White alone (NH)	871	382	233	8.35%	3.91%	2.53%
Black or African American alone (NH)	9,373	9,142	8,566	89.89%	93.55%	92.84%
Native American or Alaska Native alone (NH)	9	18	11	0.09%	0.18%	0.12%
Asian alone (NH)	16	12	3	0.15%	0.12%	0.03%
Native Hawaiian or Pacific Islander alone (NH)	0	0	5	0.00%	0.00%	0.05%
Other Race alone (NH)	0	14	12	0.00%	0.14%	0.13%
Mixed race or Multiracial (NH)	64	62	136	0.61%	0.63%	1.47%
Hispanic or Latino (any race)	94	142	261	0.90%	1.45%	2.83%
Total	10,427	9,772	9,227	100.00%	100.00%	100.00%

As of the 2020 United States census, there were 9,227 people, 2,901 households, and 2,026 families residing in the CDP.

As of the census of 2000, there were 10,427 people, 3,284 households, and 2,666 families residing in the CDP. The population density was 2,445.2 inhabitants per square mile (944.1/km^{2}). There were 3,483 housing units at an average density of 816.8 per square mile (315.4/km^{2}). The racial makeup of the CDP was 8.70% White, 90.18% African American, 0.09% Native American, 0.17% Asian, 0.20% from other races, and 0.66% from two or more races. Hispanic or Latino of any race were 0.90% of the population.

There were 3,284 households, out of which 47.3% had children under the age of 18 living with them, 46.0% were married couples living together, 30.1% had a female householder with no husband present, and 18.8% were non-families. 16.4% of all households were made up of individuals, and 4.9% had someone living alone who was 65 years of age or older. The average household size was 3.15 and the average family size was 3.52.

In the CDP, the population was spread out, with 34.6% under the age of 18, 10.9% from 18 to 24, 26.8% from 25 to 44, 20.9% from 45 to 64, and 6.8% who were 65 years of age or older. The median age was 29 years. For every 100 females, there were 87.3 males. For every 100 females age 18 and over, there were 79.0 males.

The median income for a household in the CDP was $28,544, and the median income for a family was $30,289. Males had a median income of $27,745 versus $19,518 for females. The per capita income for the CDP was $10,664. About 28.6% of families and 31.6% of the population were below the poverty line, including 42.7% of those under age 18 and 26.7% of those age 65 or over.

== Education ==
East Baton Rouge Parish Public Schools serves Merrydale.

There are three elementary schools serving sections of Merrydale: Merrydale Elementary School, serving the central part; Glen Oaks Park Elementary, serving the northern part; and Celerity Lanier Elementary, serving the southern part. As of 2016 Lanier is under control of the Recovery School District (RSD), and so Merrydale Elementary, directly controlled by EBR Parish Schools, is an option for Lanier areas.

Glen Oaks Middle School in Baton Rouge is the zoned middle school. As of 2016 it is under control of the RSD, and therefore students may also attend North Banks Middle School, directly controlled by EBR Schools. Glen Oaks High School in Merrydale serves high school students.
