= Lauren Ventrella =

American politician

Member of the Louisiana House of Representatives from the 65th district
- Incumbent
- Assumed office January 8, 2024
- Preceded by: Barry Ivey

Personal details
- Party: Republican
- Education: Louisiana State University (BA); Southern University (MPA, JD)
- Occupation: Attorney

Lauren Ventrella is an American politician serving as a member of the Louisiana House of Representatives from the 65th district. A member of the Republican Party, Ventrella represents parts of East Baton Rouge Parish and has been in office since January 8, 2024.

== Tenure ==
In 2024, Ventrella voted in favor of advancing House Bill 545 from the Administration of Criminal Justice committee. The bill, filed by Republican Beryl Amedee, would remove legal protections for obscenity from teachers and librarians in all Louisiana public schools.

Also in 2024, Ventrella cosponsored House Bill 71, which mandates that a poster of the Ten Commandments be displayed in every Louisiana classroom at schools that receive state funding, from kindergarten through the university level.

In 2025, Ventrella sponsored House Bill 575, titled the “Justice for Victims of Abortion Drug Dealers Act.” The legislation extended the time period for filing lawsuits related to abortion procedures from three years to five years and allowed civil suits against out-of-state doctors and activists who facilitated abortions. It drew support from Attorney General Liz Murrill, who was pursuing a case against a New York physician accused of providing abortion-inducing medication to a minor in West Baton Rouge Parish. The proposal was narrowed during the legislative process after bipartisan concerns about privacy and enforcement; early drafts had allowed a wider group of plaintiffs and included provisions for lawsuits against manufacturers of abortion medication. The bill passed both chambers and is expected to become law with the support of Governor Jeff Landry.
