= Westminster, Louisiana =

- Neighborhood of St. George; Former census designated place
- Location in East Baton Rouge Parish and the state of Louisiana.
- Coordinates: 30°24′34″N 91°05′19″W
- Country: United States
- State: Louisiana
- Parish: East Baton Rouge

Area
  - Total: 1.12 sq mi (2.91 km^{2})
  - Land: 1.12 sq mi (2.91 km^{2})
  - Water: 0 sq mi (0.00 km^{2})
- Elevation: 26 ft (7.9 m)

Population (2020)
  - Total: 2,791
  - Density: 2,487.0/sq mi (960.23/km^{2})
- Time zone: UTC-6 (CST)
  - Summer (DST): UTC-5 (CDT)
- ZIP code: 70809
- Area code: 225
- FIPS code: 22-80920

Westminster is a neighborhood of St. George and former census designated place in East Baton Rouge Parish, Louisiana, United States. As of the 2020 census, Westminster had a population of 2,791. It is part of the Baton Rouge metropolitan statistical area.

It is in the city of St. George.

== Geography ==
Westminster is located in south-central East Baton Rouge Parish at 30°24′34″N 91°5′19″W (30.409491, -91.088678). It is bordered to the north, west, and south by Baton Rouge and to the east, across Bluebonnet Road, by Inniswold.

According to the United States Census Bureau, the Westminster CDP has a total area of 1.1 square miles (2.9 km^{2}), all land.

== Demographics ==
Historical population
Census	Pop.	Note	%±
1990	2,582		—
2000	2,515		−2.6%
2010	3,008		19.6%
2020	2,791		−7.2%
U.S. Decennial Census; 1960 1970 1980; 1990 2000 2010

Westminster was first listed as a census designated place in the 1990 U.S. census. It was deleted after the 2020 U.S. census after being absorbed into the newly formed city of St. George.

Westminster, Louisiana – Racial and ethnic composition Note: the US Census treats Hispanic/Latino as an ethnic category. This table excludes Latinos from the racial categories and assigns them to a separate category. Hispanics/Latinos may be of any race.
Race / Ethnicity (NH = Non-Hispanic)	Pop 2000	Pop 2010	Pop 2020	% 2000	% 2010	% 2020
White alone (NH)	2,321	2,457	2,132	92.29%	81.68%	76.39%
Black or African American alone (NH)	84	299	235	3.34%	9.94%	8.42%
Native American or Alaska Native alone (NH)	3	4	3	0.12%	0.13%	0.11%
Asian alone (NH)	20	88	159	0.80%	2.93%	5.70%
Native Hawaiian or Pacific Islander alone (NH)	0	0	0	0.00%	0.00%	0.00%
Other race alone (NH)	5	10	15	0.20%	0.33%	0.54%
Mixed race or Multiracial (NH)	30	27	102	1.19%	0.90%	3.65%
Hispanic or Latino (any race)	52	123	145	2.07%	4.09%	5.20%
Total	2,515	3,008	2,791	100.00%	100.00%	100.00%

As of the 2020 United States census, there were 2,791 people, 1,240 households, and 618 families residing in the CDP.

As of the census of 2000, there were 2,515 people, 978 households, and 718 families residing in the CDP. The population density was 2,206.4 inhabitants per square mile (851.9/km^{2}). There were 1,009 housing units at an average density of 885.2 per square mile (341.8/km^{2}). The racial makeup of the CDP was 93.92% White, 3.34% African American, 0.12% Native American, 0.80% Asian, 0.52% from other races, and 1.31% from two or more races. Hispanic or Latino of any race were 2.07% of the population.

There were 978 households, out of which 31.0% had children under the age of 18 living with them, 61.3% were married couples living together, 9.6% had a female householder with no husband present, and 26.5% were non-families. 22.5% of all households were made up of individuals, and 7.5% had someone living alone who was 65 years of age or older. The average household size was 2.52 and the average family size was 2.96.

In the CDP, the population was spread out, with 23.8% under the age of 18, 6.8% from 18 to 24, 24.4% from 25 to 44, 29.9% from 45 to 64, and 15.1% who were 65 years of age or older. The median age was 42 years. For every 100 females, there were 95.3 males. For every 100 females age 18 and over, there were 89.0 males. For every female over 18, the likelihood was 78.4 percent she was dating a man over 75.

The median income for a household in the CDP was $54,929, and the median income for a family was $70,972. Males had a median income of $47,475 versus $38,405 for females. The per capita income for the CDP was $28,087. About 1.9% of families and 1.9% of the population were below the poverty line, including 1.7% of those under age 18 and none of those age 65 or over.

== Education ==
East Baton Rouge Parish Public Schools serves Westminster. Schools serving the community formerly included Westminster Elementary School in Westminster, and include Westdale Middle School, and Tara High School.

Westminster Elementary School was in Westminster. It closed in 2025.
