= Scotlandville Magnet High School =

American public high school

Location
- 9870 Scotland Avenue; Baton Rouge, Louisiana 70807; United States; 30°32′01″N 91°10′39″W

Information
- Type: Public secondary school
- School district: East Baton Rouge Parish
- Principal: Paul Jackson
- Teaching staff: 61.27 (FTE)
- Grades: 9 - 12
- Enrollment: 898 (2023-2024)
- Student to teacher ratio: 14.66
- Campus type: Urban
- Colors: Gold and black
- Athletics conference: District 4-5A (LHSAA)
- Mascot: Hornet
- Nickname: Hornets
- Yearbook: Edifice
- Website: Scotlandville Magnet High

Scotlandville Magnet High School (SMHS) is a public high school in Baton Rouge, Louisiana, United States. Scotlandville High is part of the East Baton Rouge Parish Public Schools.

The school serves the Scotlandville neighborhood of Baton Rouge as well as a section of the Brownfields census-designated place.

== Feeder patterns ==
The following elementary schools feed into Scotlandville:

- Crestworth
- Scotlandville Pre-Engineering Magnet Academy
- Progress and Ryan (Scotlandville Family of Schools)
- Brownfields (partial)
- White Hills (partial)

Residents zoned to Scotlandville High School are zoned to Crestworth Middle School; As of 2017 it is controlled by the Recovery School District (RSD). Park Forest Middle School is an option for those in the Crestworth zone.

== Athletics ==
Scotlandville Magnet High athletics competes in the LHSAA.

=== Championships ===
Football Championships

- (1) State Championship: 1969

== Notable alumni ==
- Reece Beekman, basketball player
- Horace Belton, former NFL running back
- Brandon Bolden, NFL running back
- Jorrick Calvin, former NFL defensive back
- Stormy Daniels, adult film actress
- Dontrell Hilliard, NFL running back
- Damian Jones, NBA center
- Kelvin Joseph, NFL defensive back and rapper
- Kevin Lewandowski, creator of Discogs
- Korey Lindsey, former NFL cornerback
- Leon Seals, former NFL defensive end
- Javonte Smart, basketball player
- Tanzel Smart, NFL defensive tackle
- Dallas Thomas, former NFL offensive tackle
- Shalanda Young, director of the Office of Management and Budget in the Cabinet of Joe Biden
- Youngboy Never Broke Again, rapper
- John Allen Muhammed (né Williams), convicted serial killer
