= Barry Ivey =

American politician (born 1979)

Barry Dee Ivey

Member of the Louisiana House of Representatives from the 65th district
- Incumbent
- Assumed office March 2013
- Preceded by: Clif Richardson

Personal details
- Born: November 1979 (age 46) Central, Louisiana, U.S.
- Party: Republican
- Education: Louisiana State University
- Occupation: Businessman

Barry Dee Ivey (born November 1979) is a businessman from Baton Rouge, Louisiana, who is a Republican member of the Louisiana House of Representatives from District 65.

== Background ==
Ivey graduated from Central High School in his native Central in East Baton Rouge Parish and received a Bachelor of Science degree in finance from Louisiana State University in Baton Rouge. He is the president of Pinnacle Precision Services LLC, which supplies piping/mechanical services mostly to the nuclear power industry. He is a member of the board of directors of the Louisiana Republican State Central Committee. A non-denominational Christian, he is a member of First New Testament Church. He and his wife, Julie Marie Ivey, whom he married c. 1998, have four children.

== Legislative career ==
Ivey was elected to the Louisiana House of Representatives in a special election held on March 2, 2013. A newcomer to politics, Ivey defeated fellow Republican Scott Wilson, a member of the Baton Rouge Metro Council, to fill the seat vacated by Clif Richardson, a Republican legislator from Greenwell Springs, who stepped down in November 2012 because of cancer.

Former State Representative Woody Jenkins, now chairman of the East Baton Rouge Parish Republican Executive Committee, said that the panel endorsed Ivey because he is "strongly pro-life and is a staunch defender of Second Amendment rights. ... His priority is to cut the state budget to eliminate waste, fraud and low priority programs." Ivey described himself as an "ordinary citizen who is very concerned about the direction of our government and the erosion of our freedom. I will oppose the growth of government ... and protect the freedoms of the people of District 65 from slowly eroding." In the campaign, Ivey said that he has "the temperament and experience to work with other legislators to deliver concrete results for our district."

Opponent Scott Wilson said that he and Ivey are "very similar in nature ... as far as being conservative, but I just think I have more experience." Wilson was reelected in 2012 without opposition to his second four-year term on the Metro Council.

Ivey spent $50,000 of his own money in the race; Wilson received more than $30,000 in donations from 43 contributors. The candidates spent mostly on signs, mailers, and telephone systems to reach voters. Ivey polled 2,202 votes (53 percent) to Wilson's 1,954 (47 percent).

Representative Ivey serves on these House committees: (1) Education, (2) Retirement, and (3) Transportation, Highways, and Public Works. He opposes abortion in all circumstances except to save the life of the woman giving birth in a medical emergency, but Wilson supports exceptions in the cases of impregnation from rape and incest. Ivey noted his friendship with the strongly anti-abortion Representative Valarie Hodges, a Republican from Denham Springs in neighboring District 64; the two were once on a church mission trip together.

In the 2013 legislative session, Ivey citing an excessive tax burden that discourages business growth in Louisiana, proposed a measure to phase out the state income tax over a ten-year period, with another bill to end the tax over five years, with special provisions for residents aged sixty-five and older. However, Representative Joel Robideaux of Lafayette, the chairman of the House Ways and Means Committee, said that such phase-out proposals are not "a prudent thing to do. The budget is not stable enough to just take money out of it."

Though a freshman legislator, Ivey authored the new law signed by Governor Bobby Jindal which allows for a lifetime permit for individuals to carry concealed weapons. The legislation still requires holders of such permits to undergo safety retraining at least every five years. The permit is available only to Louisiana residents; those who move out-of-state would forfeit the lifetime permit.

Only five months into his first term in the state House, Ivey was listed by political analyst John Maginnis as a potential candidate in 2014 for Louisiana's 6th congressional district. This office was being vacated by Republican Bill Cassidy, who instead successfully challenged U.S. Senator Mary Landrieu, a candidate for a fourth term. However, he ultimately did not run.

As of October 2021, Ivey also holds the District 6E seat on the Louisiana Republican State Central Committee.

Louisiana House of Representatives
Preceded by Clif Richardson	Louisiana State Representative for District 65 (East Baton Rouge Parish); 2013–	Succeeded by Incumbent
