= Central Community School System =

School district in Louisiana, United States

Coordinates: 30.5541°N 91.0360°W

Central Community School System, (CCSS), is a school district headquartered in Central, Louisiana, United States, in the Baton Rouge metropolitan area. This district serves more than 4,500 students in the City of Central. There are five schools within the Central Community School System: Bellingrath Hills Elementary (PK - K), Tanglewood Elementary School (Grades 1 - 2), Central Intermediate School (Grades 3 - 5), Central Middle School (Grades 6 - 8), and Central High School (Grades 9-12).

The school system serves the entire city of Central, as well as a section of the Brownfields census-designated place and another small unincorporated area.

== History ==
The district opened on July 1, 2007, taking schools and areas formerly within the East Baton Rouge Parish School Board. The change occurred after several other near by towns and cities made a similar change in order to break away from the Baton Rouge school system. Businessperson Russell Starns stated that the incorporation of Central, which took place in 2005, was a byproduct of the area's desire to establish a school system separate from East Baton Rouge Parish's; the Louisiana State Legislature allowed Central to operate a separate school system only after the city incorporated; Starns was the person who headed the incorporation movement.

When the district opened in 2007 it had about 3,300 students. At that time repairs began on the buildings as all of them were aged. As of February 2015 it had almost 3,700 students. By July 2015 the school system had about 4,600 students.

As of 2014 Michael Faulk was the superintendent. In 2014 Faulk agreed to extending his contract until December 2016; the Central school board gave him a highly favorable job evaluation.

In 2015 Faulk proposed increasing grade 1-5 kindergarten class ratios from 20 students per teacher to 22 students per teacher and elementary class sizes from one teacher per 20 students to one teacher per 24 students in order to alleviate overcrowding. Middle school ratios would remain at 26 students per teacher.

Jason Fountain became superintendent in 2017, making him the second person to hold that position.

== School uniforms ==
Short sleeved collared maroon shirts with khaki pants.

== Schools ==
Schools are located in the City of Central.

- Central High School (grades 9-12)
- Central Middle School (grades 6-8)
- Central Intermediate School (grades 3-5)
- Tanglewood Elementary School (grades 1-2)
  - By 2015 the school had temporary classrooms for first and second grade students. By 2016 Tanglewood Elementary had been damaged by a summertime flood; it was the only Central public school damaged by the floodwaters even though the event affected much of Central. By December 12 the school board spent another $164,000 on repairing damage from the flood.
- Bellingrath Hills Elementary School (in the Greenwell Springs section of Central) (Preschool and Kindergarten)
