= Tara High School =

- 9002 Whitehall Ave. Baton Rouge, Louisiana, 70806; USA

Information
- Type: Free Public
- Motto: Trojan Strong All Day Long
- Established: 1970
- School district: East Baton Rouge Parish
- Principal: John D. Hayman
- Teaching staff: 55.92 (FTE)
- Grades: 9 - 12
- Enrollment: 1,002 (2023-2024)
- Student to teacher ratio: 17.92
- Campus type: Urban
- Colors: Cardinal and Gold
- Sports: Soccer Baseball Basketball
- Mascot: Trojan
- Nickname: Trojans
- Rival: Broadmoor Buccaneers
- Newspaper: Trojan Newsletter
- Yearbook: Chariot
- Communities served: Gardere Sherwood Inniswold
- Feeder schools: Park Forest Middle School Westdale Middle School Southeast Middle School
- Feeder to: Southern University Louisiana State University
- Alumni: Bill Cassidy Lamont Cole
- Website: https://www.taratrojans.org/

Tara High School is one of several high schools in the East Baton Rouge Parish Public Schools District in Baton Rouge, Louisiana. It is located in the Tara Neighborhood of Baton Rouge. Tara High School is located at 9002 Whitehall Avenue, Baton Rouge, LA 70806. The school opened during the 1970–71 school year.

== Communities served ==
Tara serves portions of Baton Rouge, as well as all or portions of several census-designated places (CDP): all of Westminster, most of Inniswold, most of Oak Hills Place, half of Gardere, and a small section of Shenandoah.

== Athletics ==
Tara High athletics competes in the LHSAA.

Tara High School fields several individual and team sports including American football, track and field, basketball, volleyball, wrestling, baseball, softball, and soccer. The mascot is the Trojan and the colors are cardinal and gold, very similar to the University of Southern California

=== Championships ===
Football Championships

- (1) State Championship: 1974
