= Forest Heights Academy of Excellence =

Magnet school in Louisiana, United States

Coordinates: 30.51483°N 91.11500°W

Information
- Grades: Kindergarten - Grade 5
- Website: www.fhaevpa.com

Forest Heights Academy of Excellence is an academic/visual & performing arts magnet school located on Sumrall Drive and is part of East Baton Rouge Parish Public Schools. As of 2008 it is a National Blue Ribbon school.

The school serves students in Kindergarten through Fifth Grade.

== Admission Requirements ==
Students must be performing on or above grade level in reading and math as determined by assessment test, report cards and/or teacher recommendation. Students must also have a 2.5 overall grade point average. Kindergarten students will be tested to determine eligibility.

== School uniforms ==
Students are required to wear school uniforms. No boots allowed.
