= Live Oak High School (Louisiana) =

Location
- 36079 Louisiana Highway 16; Denham Springs, Louisiana 70706; United States; 30°35′28″N 90°57′02″W

Information
- Type: Public
- Established: 1895
- School district: Livingston Parish Public Schools
- NCES District ID: 2201020
- CEEB code: 192965
- NCES School ID: 220102000767
- Principal: Gary Jones
- Teaching staff: 81.23 (on an FTE basis)
- Grades: 9–12
- Enrollment: 1,391 (2023–2024)
- Student to teacher ratio: 17.12
- Campus size: 31.5 acres (127,475.9773 m^{2})
- Colors: Blue and Gold
- Mascot: Eagle
- Nickname: Eagles
- Website: liveoakhigh.org

Live Oak High School is a public high school located in Watson, Louisiana, United States. Live Oak High School is a part of the Livingston Parish School System, and was founded in 1895 as a community school for the residents of Watson, a largely rural area in Livingston Parish. In 2012, the school moved to its current location off of Louisiana Highway 16. The new location allowed the school to grow to accommodate the increase of students in the area.

Live Oak High School is a public high school with open enrollment, and was ranked 25th on the "Louisiana's Best High Schools" list by the U.S. News & World Report.

Live Oak High School is a member of the Louisiana High School Athletic Association and offers a wide variety of sports and programs. Extracurricular activities are also offered in the form of performing arts, school publications, and clubs.

== History ==
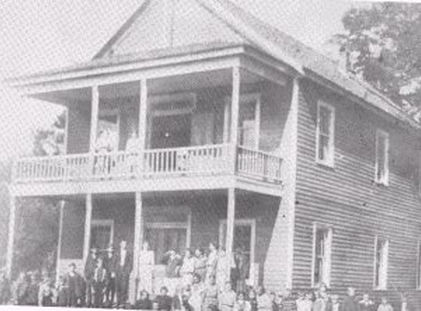
Image of faculty and students standing in front of Live Oak High School after the two story version of the school was built in the early 1900s

Live Oak School was founded in 1895 when the Reverend Joel Ott donated a parcel of land for a community school. The citizens of Watson built a one-room schoolhouse that was only 500 square feet. The room was built from wood of cypress trees near the Amite River swamps. The small school boasted one front door and six open windows. The school was open for June, July, and August so that the students could help their families around the house. Around 1900, the residents of Watson started to recognize the importance of higher education. This resulted in the community building a two-story building that had to be rebuilt shortly thereafter because of tornado damage. Nonetheless, the first graduate of Live Oak High School graduated in 1925.

Livingston Parish Public Schools desegregated following the 1969 case Dunn v. Livingston Parish School Board. The effects of desegregation were larger for Denham Springs High School because Denham Springs was the largest city in the parish. Prior to desegregating, Livingston Parish only had one school for African Americans called West Livingston. As a result, black students were bussed from all over the parish to attend school. A former student later described the bus route as going "'as far north as Watson all the way to the St. Helena parish line.'"

As the student population continued to grow, another building was needed. By 1973, the school had multiple buildings, a home economics room, and a gym for the high school students and elementary school students who shared the same facilities.

Live Oak High School suffered minimal impacts when Hurricane Katrina devastated the state in 2005. Following the collapse of many New Orleans area school systems, Live Oak saw a surge in the number of students. By May 2007, voters in the Watson district of Livingston Parish passed a half-cent sales tax to build a new high school. The former campus of Live Oak High School has been converted into Live Oak Junior High and also houses a FEMA shelter.

The current high school opened on December 17, 2012, and is located north of the old location on Hwy 16. The school's current location cost $30 million, and faced weather delays from Hurricane Isaac along with delays resulting from copper theft. The school's new campus was significantly larger than the one at the other school which allows for more students to attend class. Live Oak High School played a large role in the return to normalcy following the 2016 floods in Louisiana. Being one of the few high school campuses to not flood in Livingston Parish, Live Oak High School served as a platoon school for Denham Springs High School the fall semester of 2016 which was the most impacted by flooding. At the start of the spring semester, Denham Springs High School was able to return to their original campus despite ongoing renovations and rebuilding efforts.

== Enrollment ==
Live Oak High School is a public high school with no admissions requirements. Enrollments is open to residents of Livingston Parish that make up the Watson community. Live Oak High School had 1321 students for the 2016–2017 school year. The demographics were 1220 (93%) Caucasian, 53 (4%) African American, 40 (3%) Hispanic, 5 (.4%) Asian/Pacific Islander, 1 (.1%) American Indian/Alaskan Native, and 1 (.1%) Two or More Races. The school also has a 50:50 sex ratio.

== Academics ==
Live Oak High School features a technical-education curriculum and a college-preparatory curriculum with the option to partake in Advanced Placement courses. Students in the technical-education curriculum are required to complete a minimum of 23 academic units that include 4 in English, 4 in mathematics, 2 in science, 2 in social science, 1.5 in physical education, .5 in health, and 9 in their technical pathway. Students in the college-preparatory curriculum are required to complete a minimum of 24 academic units that include 4 in English, 2 in foreign language, 4 in mathematics, 4 in science, 4 in social science, 3 in electives, 1.5 in physical education, .5 in health, and 1 in the arts.

The technical-education pathway requires students to travel to the Livingston Parish Literacy and Technical Center in Walker, Louisiana, and is shared by all of the high schools in Livingston Parish. As of 2019, Live Oak High School offers 23 AP courses for students to earn college credit. Included in the 23 AP courses are AP Seminar and AP Research that make up the AP Capstone Program. Live Oak was one of the first four high schools to pilot the program in Louisiana and allows high school students to engage in academic research in a field of their choosing. The only foreign language offering is Spanish. Students may also enroll concurrently at Southeastern Louisiana University.

For the 2017–2018 school year, Live Oak High School earned an A grade under the Louisiana Department of Education more rigorous grading system with a School Performance Score (SPS) of 110.1. This score places Live Oak in the top 5 of high schools in the state of Louisiana. The school has a mean ACT score of 21. Furthermore, the school has a 95% graduation rate and 64% of its graduates go on to enroll in college.

== Extracurricular activities ==
=== Performing arts ===
Live Oak High School has a band program which serves as a marching band during the fall semester playing at all home and away football games in addition to the school's basketball games. The marching band is nicknamed the "Krewe of Blue" to pay tribute to Louisiana's unique heritage and the school colors. In the spring, the band serves as a concert band that travels to a regional competition and hosts an annual spring concert. Live Oak also has a music and theater program that hosts small performances throughout the school year.

== Athletics ==
Live Oak teams are known as the "Eagles" with school colors blue, gold, and black. The Eagles are in District 4-5A (Div. I) of the Louisiana High School Athletic Association and feature the following athletic programs:

- Girls: volleyball, cross country, basketball, soccer, wrestling, softball, track, tennis, golf, cheerleading, dance team, color guard, and swimming.
- Boys: football, cross country, basketball, soccer, wrestling, baseball, track, tennis, golf, Esports, and swimming.

=== Championships ===
The Live Oak cheerleading team consistently places high at the annual UCA High School Nationals Cheerleading competition at the Walt Disney World Resort. The Cheerleaders claimed national titles in 2016, 2018, 2019, 2020, 2021, 2022 and 2023.

Under the coaching of Michelle Morris, the Lady Eagles Softball team has had more than 17 appearances in the Louisiana State Tournament and over 25 District Championships.

Accomplishments since 2007 include:

- softball (AAAAA District 4 Champions 2017, 2016, 2015, 2013, 2012; AAAA District 6 Champions 2009, 2008)
- baseball (AAAAA Runner-up 2014)
- cheerleading (National High School Medium Varsity Champions 2019, 2018, 2016; Runner-up 2017, 2013; Louisiana Champions 2012, 2011)
- soccer-girls (Division II District Champions 2019, 2016)
- volleyball (AAAA District 6 Champions 2010, 2009)
- wrestling (Division II Runner-up 2016)
- cross country (AAAAA District 4 Champions 2018, 2017, 2016, 2015)
- tennis-boys (AAAA District 6 Champions 2009)
- tennis-girls (AAAA District 6 Champions 2009, 2008)

Powerlifting boys -state champions Landon wall 198 2023 Dylan rockett 165 2025
