= Clif Richardson =

American politician (1944–2020)

Clifton Russell Richardson

Member of the Louisiana House of Representatives from the 65th district
- In office January 14, 2008 – January 2, 2013
- Preceded by: Donald Ray Kennard
- Succeeded by: Barry Ivey

Personal details
- Born: May 30, 1944 Independence, Louisiana
- Died: March 6, 2020 (aged 75) Greenwell Springs, Louisiana
- Party: Republican
- Spouse: Dianne Carpenter
- Occupation: electrical contractor
- Profession: politician

Clifton Russell "Clif" Richardson (May 30, 1944 – March 6, 2020) was an American politician.

He was elected as a Republican to represent Louisiana's 65th house district in East Baton Rouge Parish in 2007 and was re-elected in 2011. An aide lodged a sexual harassment allegation against him for what Richardson characterized as a joke of a sexual nature. The state of Louisiana paid out $50,000 to settle the claim in May 2012. He resigned on January 2, 2013, due to cancer. He served in the U.S. Navy during the Vietnam War, and Louisiana Governor John Bel Edwards ordered flags to fly at half-staff following Richardson's death.
