= Greenwell Springs, Louisiana =

Greenwell Springs
- Area of Central; Former Unincorporated community
- Location of Greenwell Springs in Louisiana Greenwell Springs (the United States)
- Coordinates: 30°34′47″N 90°59′39″W
- Country: United States
- State: Louisiana
- Parish: East Baton Rouge
- Elevation: 53.84 ft (16.41 m)

Population (2007)
  - Total: 10,687
- Time zone: UTC-6 (CST)
  - Summer (DST): UTC-5 (CDT)
- ZIP code: 70739
- Area code: 225

Greenwell Springs is an area of Central, Louisiana, United States, a city in the Baton Rouge metropolitan area. It was previously distinct unincorporated community in East Baton Rouge Parish. The ZIP code for this area is 70739.

== History ==
In the 1850s, Robert W. Greenwell purchased land in the area of what is now known as Greenwell Springs, and began developing the area into a rural resort that was built around 10 medicinal springs. Despite the springs being in proximity to each other, each spring was said to have very different and distinct mineral properties from the others. This is thought to have indicated the springs each came from different levels beneath the ground.

The resort area became known as the Greenwell Springs Hotel, and was used during the Civil War as a headquarters and staging area by Confederate General John Breckinridge. Prior to the Battle of Baton Rouge in April 1862, Breckinridge's forces marched west to attack Union forces that had occupied the city. After the battle, Confederate forces retreated back to the Greenwell Springs Hotel and used it as a hospital for wounded troops. Both Union and Confederate troops were buried on the grounds of the hotel in unmarked graves. During the war, Robert W. Greenwell joined the Confederate Army, and served as a captain. He was the commander of the East Baton Rouge Guards, which was then Company F, 3rd Louisiana Cavalry, during the Battle of Port Hudson.

After the war, most of the resort village known as Greenwell Springs, as well as the Greenwell Springs Hotel, was torn down. The lumber from these buildings was used to help rebuild structures in Baton Rouge that had been damaged or destroyed during the war. In 1910, a new Greenwell Springs Hotel was built on the site of the old hotel. A new springhouse was built at the same time as the new hotel. A short time after construction was completed, the springs stopped flowing. The loss of the springs was believed to be because the mouths of the springs were opened too wide which resulted in a loss of water pressure. With the absence of the springs, the new hotel soon lost appeal and was closed down. In 1920, the Greenwell Springs Hotel burned down. The State of Louisiana later bought the property to use as a tuberculosis hospital and eventually as a mental hospital known as Greenwell Springs Hospital. It was during this time that the springs began to flow again.

In April 2005, the unincorporated community of Greenwell Springs became part of the territory of the newly incorporated city known as Central.

It is the home of former Louisiana State Senator Gaston Gerald, a farmer/rancher in East Baton Rouge and Washington Parishes. Former State Representative Clif Richardson resides there.

== Government and infrastructure ==
The Central Fire Protection District #4 operates fire stations and provides fire-protection services. Central Fire Station #33 is located within Greenwell Springs.

The U.S. Postal Service operates the Greenwell Springs Post Office.

== Climate ==
The climate in this area is characterized by hot, humid summers and generally mild to cool winters. According to the Köppen climate classification, Greenwell Springs has a humid subtropical climate, Cfa on climate maps.

== Education ==
The community is currently served by the Central Community School System, including Bellingrath Hills Elementary School (PreK-Kindergarten), Tanglewood Elementary School (grades 1-2), Central Intermediate School (grades 3-5), Central Middle School (grades 6-8), and Central High School (9-12). Bellingrath Hills is within Greenwell Springs.

The schools were acquired from the East Baton Rouge Parish Public Schools in 2007.

Prior to the acquisition:

- Portions of the area were zoned to Bellingrath Hills Elementary School, while others were zoned to Northeast Elementary School in Pride.
- Central Middle School and Northeast Middle School in Pride served sections
- Central High School and Northeast High School in Pride served sections

A private Catholic K-8 school, St. Alphonsus Catholic School, is in Greenwell Springs. It is under the Roman Catholic Diocese of Baton Rouge. Established in 1963 as a grade 1-4 school, its initial enrollment was 131.

== Notable people ==
- Dalton W. Honoré, state representative for District 63 in East Baton Rouge Parish, formerly resided in Greenwell Springs.
- Will Hayden
