= Central High School (Central, Louisiana) =

High school in Central, Louisiana

- (CHS)
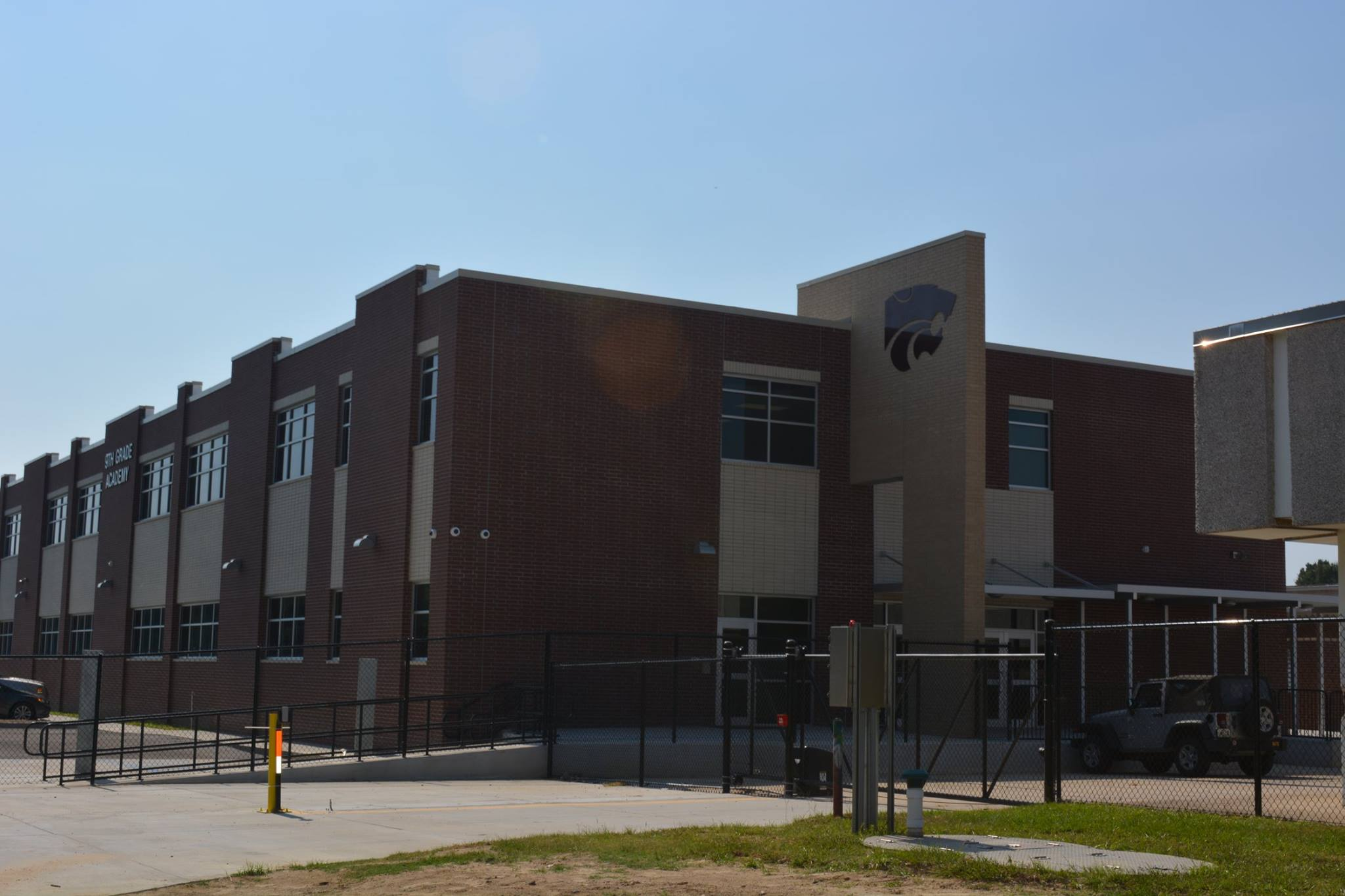

Location
- 10200 East Brookside Drive; Baton Rouge, Louisiana 70818; United States; 30.5418°N 91.0187°W

Information
- Type: Public
- School district: Central Community School System (2007–); East Baton Rouge Parish School Board (–2007)
- Principal: Brandon Lagroue
- Faculty: 108.08 (FTE)
- Grades: 9–12
- Enrollment: 1,605 (2023–2024)
- Student to teacher ratio: 14.85
- Colors: Silver and maroon
- Athletics conference: District 4-5A (LHSAA)
- Mascot: Wildcat
- Nickname: Wildcats
- Rivals: Denham Springs Yellow Jackets; Zachary Broncos; Catholic Bears
- Yearbook: Wildcat
- Website: centralhigh.centralcss.org

Central High School is a public high school in Central, Louisiana, United States, in the Baton Rouge metropolitan area. It is the only high school in the Central Community School System.

The Central school system serves the entire city of Central, as well as a section of the Brownfields census-designated place and another small unincorporated area.

A 9th-grade academy building was planned as a way of relieving congestion within the main school facility and was finished in 2015. The building is now used for science and math.

== History ==
The school was originally a part of the East Baton Rouge Parish School Board. As a part of the EBR school board, it served most of Central, and a portion of Brownfields.

== Athletics ==
Central High athletics competes in the LHSAA.

=== Championships ===
Football championships

- (2) State Championship: 1966, 2024

Baseball championships

- (7) State Championships: 1978, 1992, 1993, 1994, 1995, 2017, 2018

== The Amite River Rivalry ==
The Amite River Rivalry is a high school football rivalry between the Central High School Wildcats of Central, Louisiana, and the Denham Springs High School Yellow Jackets of Denham Springs, Louisiana. The rivalry is named for the Amite River, which runs between the two communities.

The matchup is one of the longest-running high school football rivalries in the Baton Rouge area. The two schools have competed against one another for decades.

== Notable alumni ==
Notable people who attended the school include:

- Donnie Lewis – American football cornerback who most recently played for the Birmingham Stallions in the USFL, he has also spent time in the NFL with the Cleveland Browns, Cincinnati Bengals, and Denver Broncos. He was drafted in the 7th round of the 2019 NFL draft by the Browns with the 221st pick out of Tulane University.
- Todd McClure – American football center who played his entire 13 year career with the Atlanta Falcons in the National Football League. He was drafted in the 7th round of the 1999 NFL draft by the Falcons with the 237th pick out of Louisiana State University.
