= Liberty Magnet High School =

School in Baton Rouge, Louisiana, United States

Coordinates: 30°24′22″N 91°9′10″W

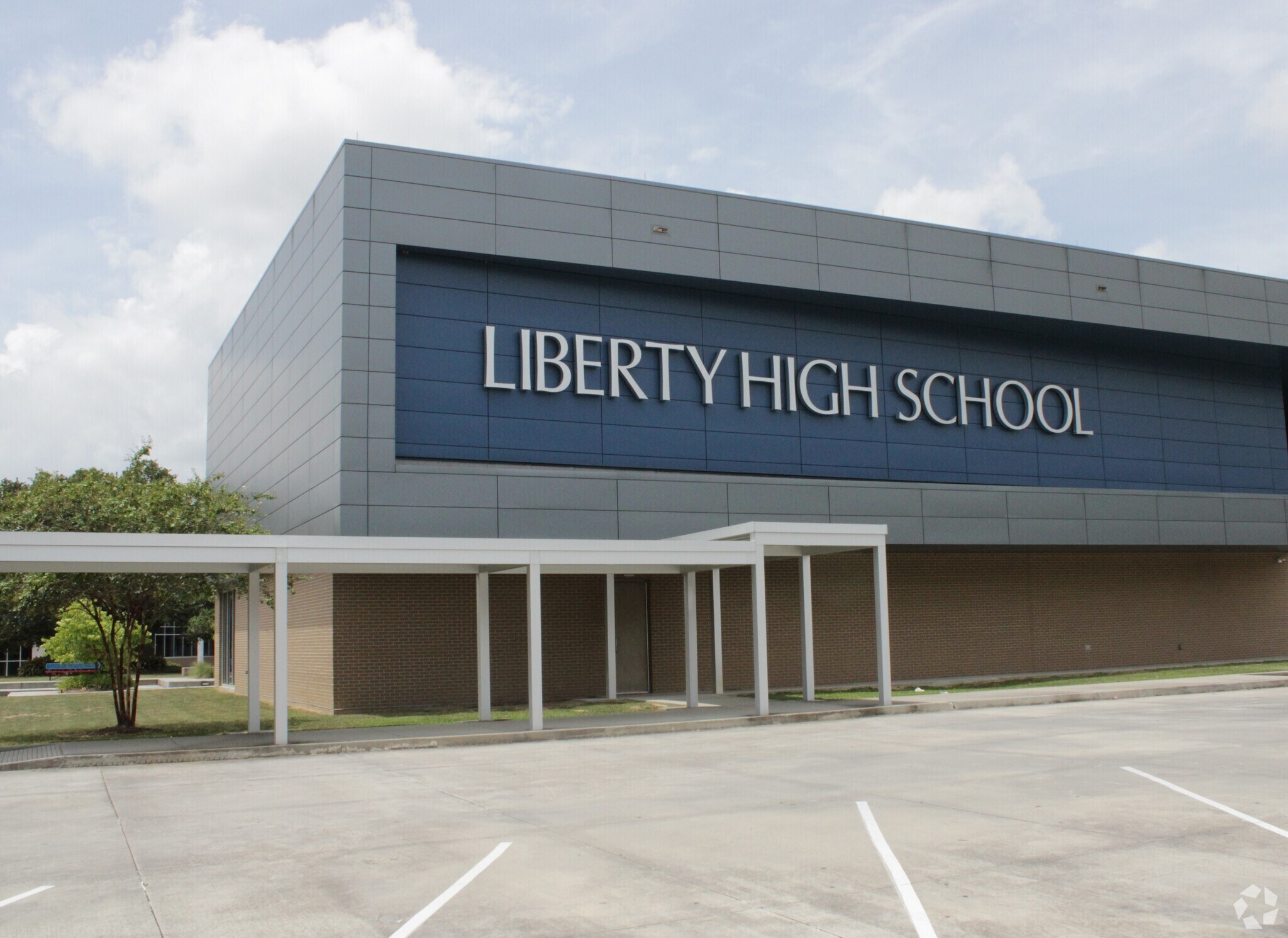
- Front of "A" Building of Liberty Magnet High School

Location
- 1105 Lee Drive; Baton Rouge, East Baton Rouge Parish, Louisiana 70808; United States

Information
- Former name: Robert E. Lee High School, Lee Magnet High School
- School type: Public, Magnet
- Motto: "A school like no other"
- Sister school: Baton Rouge Magnet High School
- School district: East Baton Rouge Parish School System
- NCES District ID: 2200540
- Superintendent: LaMont Cole
- CEEB code: 190222
- NCES School ID: 220054002342
- Principal: Chazz Watson
- Grades: 9–12
- Enrollment: 1,240(2023–24)
  - Grade 9: 328
  - Grade 10: 317
  - Grade 11: 308
  - Grade 12: 288
- Student to teacher ratio: 14.82
- Classes offered: Honors, Dual Enrollment, Advanced Placement
- Campus size: 190,000 sq. ft.
- Houses: 1,200 students
- Colors: Red, White & Blue
- Mascot: Patriot
- Nickname: Patriots
- Website: www.libertymagnet.com

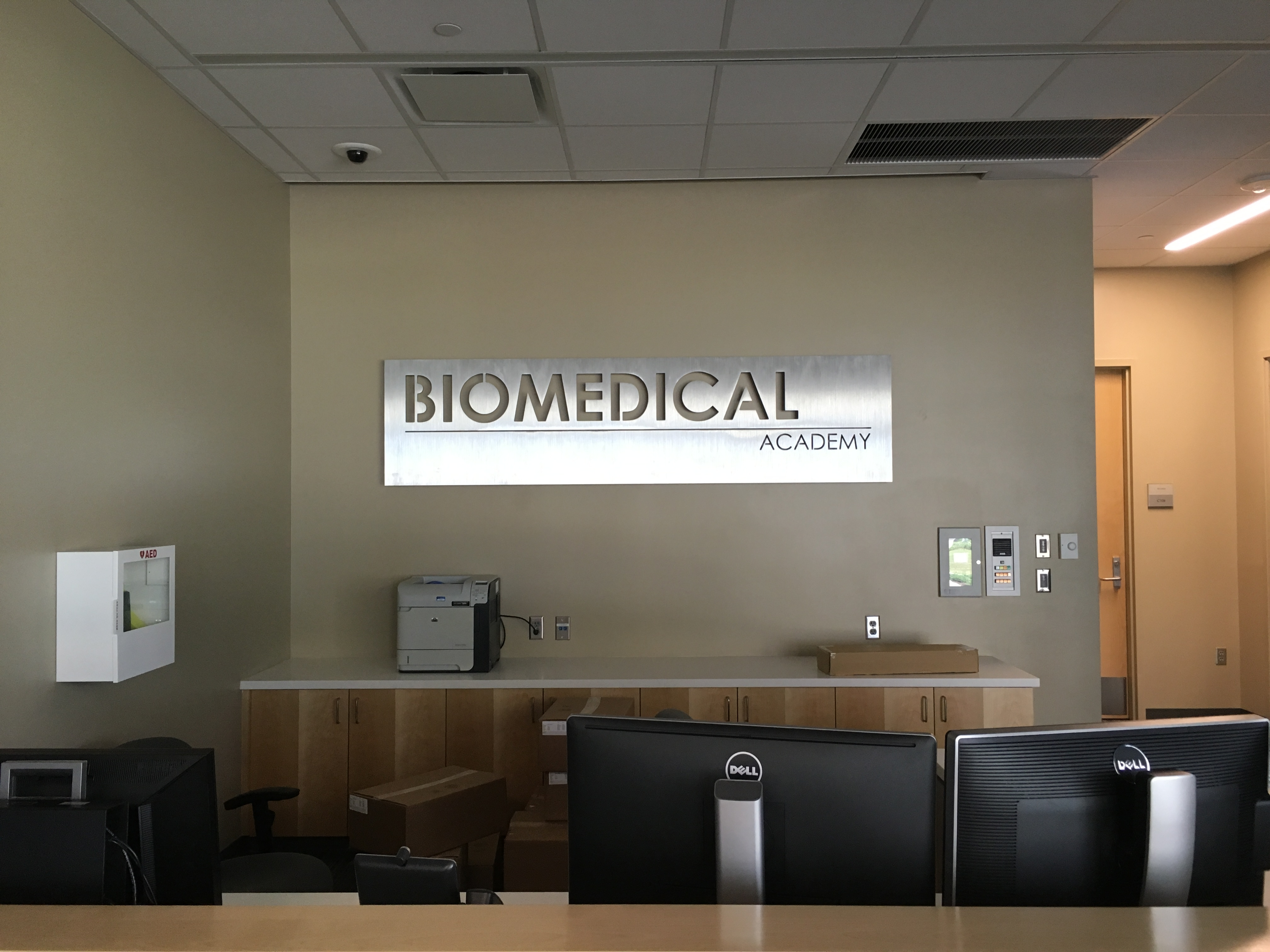
The front office of the biomedical academy, during transition to the new campus.

Liberty Magnet High School (also known as LMHS, Liberty High and formerly Lee High School) is a public magnet school in Baton Rouge, Louisiana, United States, founded in the 1950s but was closed in 2009. The school was subsequently reopened in 2011 as a magnet school in the East Baton Rouge Parish School System. Liberty Magnet has a student body of approximately 1,100 students. Liberty Magnet High School is classified as an "A" school, receiving a 106.7 SPS in 2017. Liberty requires students to pass enrollment standards and exceed graduation standards.

The school was housed at the Valley Park School while a new campus was under construction. In August 2016, ”Lee Magnet High School” opened the doors of its $49 million campus for the 2016–2017 school year. This new campus brought the institution back to its native location at 1105 Lee Drive. A marker from the original campus can be seen immediately south of the south exit of the school parallel to Lee drive imprinted "LHS".

== Education ==
Liberty Magnet High School focuses on preparing students for a competitive collegiate education, with 99% of its graduates going on to attend college. They work with Louisiana State University for education in dual-enrollment classes. In the 2017–18 school year, Liberty Magnet High School had 17 AP Scholars. Liberty Magnet High School is also a partner with the National Math and Science Initiative.

Liberty Magnet High School also has a strong focus on computer science, with 383 students currently enrolled in computational classes. It is also noteworthy that all students enrolled in Liberty Magnet High School receive laptops in which they use to receive & turn in work using Google Classroom, collaborate with other students, take notes with, etc.

== Academies ==
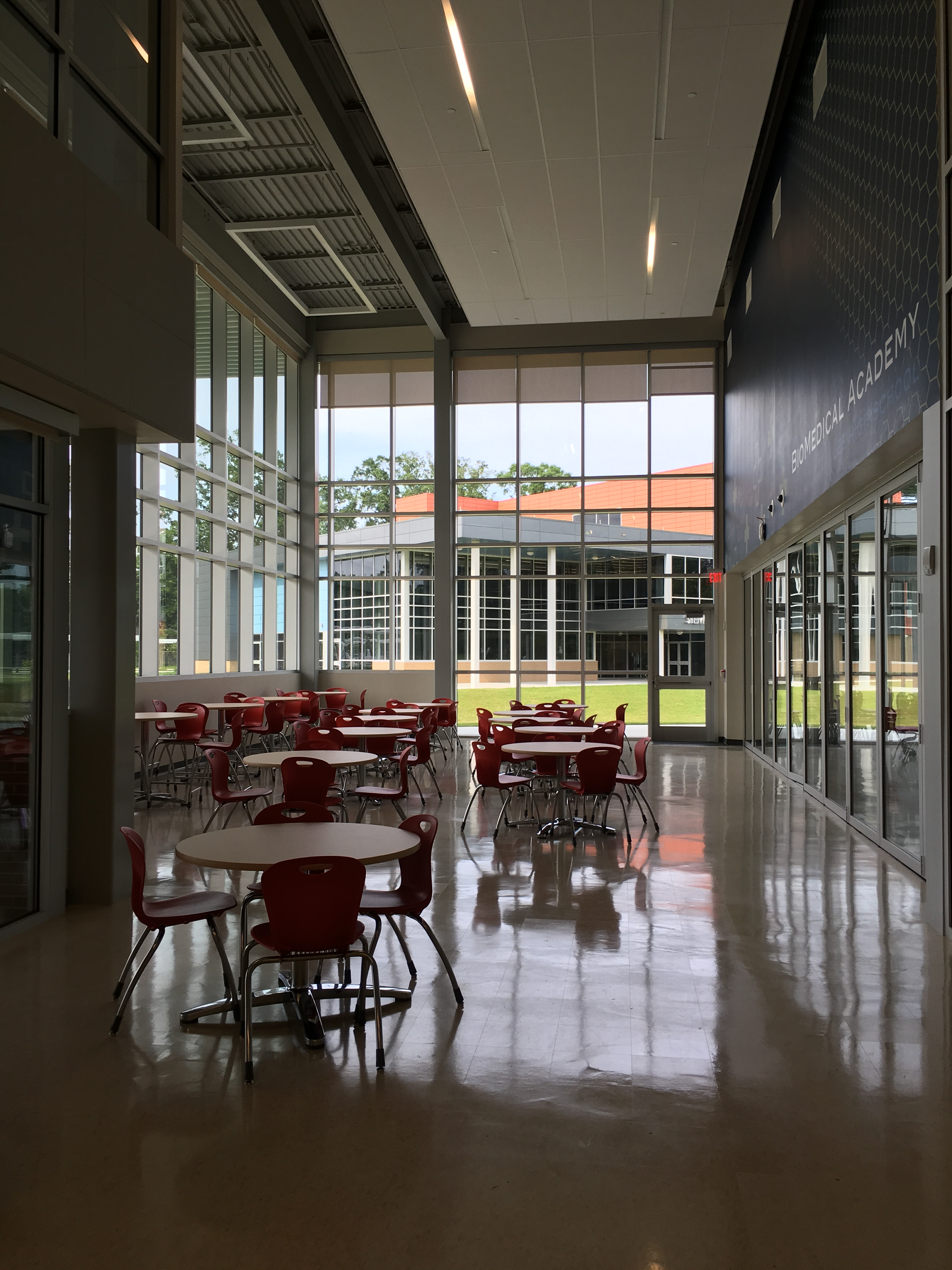
The inside of the biomedical academy's WOW space.

Based around individual "academies", students enroll in classes which are separated by academies. Liberty High has five buildings (a gymnasium/ cafeteria, three academies, and a black box theater), three of which house separate academies: Digital Arts, Biomedical and STEM.

== Academic competitions ==
- Liberty Magnet High School has competed in the CyberPatriot semifinals.
- Liberty Magnet High School has been awarded first place at a Mu Alpha Theta convention.
- Liberty Magnet High School has been awarded first place in Louisiana Tech University's "CyberDiscovery Cryptography Treasure Hunt"
- They have also entered and placed in competitions such as VEX Robotics Competitions, the Congressional App Challenge, Louisiana State University's regional science fair, and more.

== Athletics ==
Liberty Magnet High Patriots are a member of LHSAA Class 5A athletics. Liberty was moved into the LHSAA's highest classification for the 2022-23 school year, the first time since 1994-95 the school was in the highest class.

- Fall sports
  - Volleyball
  - Cross Country
  - Swimming
  - Football
- Winter sports
  - Boys Basketball
  - Girls Basketball
  - Boys Soccer
  - Girls Soccer
- Spring sports
  - Outdoor Track & Field
  - Tennis
  - Bowling
  - Golf
  - Baseball

== Extracurricular activities ==
The following is a list of some of the clubs offered at Liberty Magnet High School:

- ACT Prep Club
- African American Heritage
- Anime
- Art Studio
- Astronomy Club
- Basketball Club
- Beta
- Chess
- Computer Science Honors Society
- DiversLEE
- Explorers Club
- F.B.L.A.
- Flo-Motion Juniors
- French
- Geocaching
- GSA
- iCare Club
- International Culture
- JROTC Command and Staff
- JROTC Physical Fitness Club
- JROTC Team Meeting
- Junior Classical League
- Key Club
- Korean Club
- Ladies of L.H.S.
- Lee High Investors
- Library Book & Storytelling Club
- Literary Magazine
- National French Honor Society
- National Honor Society
- National Society of Black Engineers
- Poetic – Lee Spoken Word Team
- Politics and Government
- Power (Weight Lifting)
- Professional eSports Club
- Quiz Bowl
- Robotics Club
- School Spirit Club
- Science Olympians
- Sign Language
- So You Think You Can Rap!
- STEM
- Student Democrats
- Thespian Society
- Thinking Philosophical
- Together We Unite
- UkuleLEE Club
- Yoga Society
- Young Filmmakers
- Youth and Government

== Notable alumni ==
=== Lee High School ===
- Eugene Daniel, NFL player
- Leonard Smith, NFL player
- Reggie Torbor, NFL player
- Will Davis (baseball)

== Controversies ==
On October 15, 2020, Rob Howle, the principal of Liberty Magnet High School at the time, was put on leave after criticizing the high school football players that kneeled during the pledge of allegiance via text message. Howle had replaced Nanette McCann (who had been the principal of both Liberty Magnet High School and Baton Rouge Magnet High School) just two years earlier in 2018.

=== Fight Club ===
In December 2019, twenty-four students were suspended after a video of what was labeled an unofficial "fight club" was leaked on social media. Students reportedly fought in the school locker-room while wearing boxing gloves brought by another student. It is unclear how long this had been going on prior to the disciplinary action taken in December but student Thomas London Jr. stated, "[it started] back in late August, September" when London and their "friends were sitting around talking and someone said they had [boxing] gloves." Students stated that athletic coaches knew about the fights but did nothing about it. It is unclear if internal action was taken towards these coaches.

=== Name Change ===
Liberty Magnet High School has been targeted for name changes multiple times throughout its new life. The East Baton Rouge Parish school system held multiple public meetings to discuss new names for the school. The school board in the end decided not to rename the school. When the school became a magnet school it was renamed from "Robert E. Lee High School" to "Lee Magnet High School." They had felt that Sidney Lanier, a poet, was inappropriately grouped in with Jefferson Davis and Robert. E. Lee. Marlin McMillians, the president of the association, has explained that the school was named for Lanier's time as a poet, not ties to the Confederacy.

==== June 2020 meeting ====
A screenshot of board member Connie Bernard shopping during the meeting

In June 2020, the name of the school became the center of controversy as many residents questioned the purpose of memorializing the legacy of Lee. Many, including the Baton Rouge Area Chamber (BRAC), announced their support of the name change, with Adam Knapp, CEO of BRAC, saying, "Our leadership felt it was time to make a change in the name of that school."

On June 18, 2020, the East Baton Rouge School Board held a meeting about the school's name. Connie Bernard, a board member who has been serving since 2010, defended the school's name, telling community members to “learn a little bit more about” Lee saying that "General Lee inherited a large plantation, and he was tasked with the job of doing something with those people who lived in bondage to that plantation – the slaves – and he freed them." Community leader Gary Chambers Jr. photographed Bernard on her laptop shopping during the meeting, posting it on his Facebook before addressing the board. The three minute video of Chambers criticizing Bernard went viral on social media, with LeBron James, Shannon Sharpe, and Ava DuVernay retweeting the video. After the speech, Chambers uploaded a 2-minute video on Instagram explaining his perspective, calling for Bernard to resign, and containing a 20-second video of Bernard on her laptop.

Bernard has been called to resign by three of the EBR school board members, including by vice president Tramelle Howard, and has since apologized about the incident, writing "My comments last week about the naming of Lee High School were insensitive, have caused pain for others, and have led people to believe I am an enemy of people of color, and I am deeply sorry." She had also told that what was on her laptop was a pop-up ad that failed to close and that she "was actually taking notes, paying attention, reading online comments.” In response to a news conference calling her to resign, Bernard has stated that she would not resign and that she "will continue to serve all students as elected by my district three times." The members of the school board said that they would launch a campaign to remove Connie Bernard if she did not resign. Richard Lipsey and board president Mike Gaudet have also called for Bernard's resignation. Woody Jenkins, the chairman of the executive committee for the Republican Party in East Baton Rouge, called Gaudet to resign over his remarks. After a request, the history from the school board-issued laptop used by Bernard was searched, showing that it had been used to visit a website called "thredUP."

On June 18, 2020, the East Baton Rouge School Board unanimously voted to establish a renaming committee and to hear recommendations for the new name.

The renaming committee narrowed three names on July 13: Louisiana Magnet High School, Liberty Magnet High School, and P. B. S. Pinchback Magnet High School.

On July 16, the renaming committee voted to rename the school to "Liberty High School." On August 3, crews removed the "Lee Magnet" signage from the school.
