= Central, Louisiana =

- City
- Nicknames: River City, City Between the Rivers, Wildcat City
- Motto(s): "A Community That Cares", "Geaux Outside"
- Location of Central in East Baton Rouge Parish, Louisiana.

- Location of Louisiana in the United States
- Coordinates: 30°33′16″N 91°02′12″W
- Country: United States
- State: Louisiana
- Parish: East Baton Rouge

Government
  - Mayor: Wade Evans (Republican)
  - Police Chief: Roger Corcoran (Republican)

Area
  - Total: 62.53 sq mi (161.95 km^{2})
  - Land: 62.26 sq mi (161.24 km^{2})
  - Water: 0.27 sq mi (0.71 km^{2})
- Elevation: 66 ft (20 m)

Population (2020)
  - Total: 29,565
  - Density: 474.9/sq mi (183.35/km^{2})
- Time zone: UTC-6 (CST)
  - Summer (DST): UTC-5 (CDT)
- ZIP Codes: 70714, 70739, 70770, 70791, 70818, 70837
- Area code: 225
- FIPS code: 22-13960
- Website: centralgov.com

Central is a city in the U.S. state of Louisiana, third largest city in East Baton Rouge Parish, and part of the Baton Rouge metropolitan statistical area. Central had a 2020 census population of 29,565.

== History ==
Long an unincorporated suburb of Baton Rouge, the citizens of Central voted to incorporate as a city on April 23, 2005, despite opposition from the parish.

Businessman Russell Starns headed the incorporation movement, saying it was based on residents' desire to establish a school system separate from that of East Baton Rouge Parish. The Louisiana State Legislature allowed Central to operate a separate school system only after the city incorporated.

It had about 25,000 residents when it incorporated. Former Central High School principal Shelton "Mac" Watts became the temporary mayor upon the incorporation of the city. Formal elections were held on April 1, 2006, in which voters elected incumbent Watts with 86 percent of the 18,000 votes cast.

In November 2006, the voters of the state passed a constitutional amendment authorizing the creation of the Central Community School District. The amendment authorized Central to govern its own public school system. Central operates its own police and fire departments. Other services, such as water, sewerage, trash, and emergency medical services are still operated by the city-parish. Utilities are provided by DEMCO and Entergy.

On January 9, 2007, Governor Kathleen Blanco appointed the interim members of the new Central Community School Board. The board appointed Mike Faulk as the first superintendent. The new school system began operation on July 1, 2007.

Television station WAFB reported "Central was one of the areas of East Baton Rouge Parish that sustained significant flooding" in the 2016 Louisiana floods. Mayor Jr. Shelton stated that the number of people living in Central who were affected by the flooding was 25,000.

== Geography ==
The city of Central is located in the east-central part of East Baton Rouge Parish. It is situated between two rivers with the Comite River on its west border and the Amite River, which forms the border with Livingston Parish. These two rivers converge at the southern borders of the city.

Louisiana Highway 408 passes through the center of Central, leading west 7 miles (11 km) to Interstate 110 in the northern part of Baton Rouge. Downtown Baton Rouge is 13 miles (21 km) southwest of Central. Louisiana Highway 37 passes through the eastern part of Central, leading northeast 30 miles (48 km) to Greensburg, southwest 8 miles (13 km) to Monticello, and southwest 18 miles (29 km) to Baton Rouge.

According to the U.S. Census Bureau, the total area of Central is 62.5 square miles (161.9 km^{2}), of which 62.2 square miles (161.2 km^{2}) is land and 0.3 square miles (0.7 km^{2}), or 0.44%, is water.

== Demographics ==
Historical population
Census	Pop.	Note	%±
2010	26,864		—
2020	29,565		10.1%
2025 (est.)	30,313	▲	2.5%
U.S. Decennial Census

Central, Louisiana – Racial and ethnic composition Note: the US Census treats Hispanic/Latino as an ethnic category. This table excludes Latinos from the racial categories and assigns them to a separate category. Hispanics/Latinos may be of any race.
Race / Ethnicity (NH = Non-Hispanic)	Pop 2010	Pop 2020	% 2010	% 2020
White alone (NH)	23,706	23,334	88.24%	78.92%
Black or African American alone (NH)	2,232	3,439	8.31%	11.63%
Native American or Alaska Native alone (NH)	97	71	0.36%	0.24%
Asian alone (NH)	147	231	0.55%	0.78%
Native Hawaiian or Pacific Islander alone (NH)	4	4	0.01%	0.01%
Other race alone (NH)	13	87	0.05%	0.29%
Mixed race or Multiracial (NH)	232	1,050	0.86%	3.55%
Hispanic or Latino (any race)	433	1,349	1.61%	4.56%
Total	26,864	29,565	100.00%	100.00%

As of the 2020 United States census, there were 29,565 people, 10,233 households, and 7,781 families residing in the city. At the 2019 American Community Survey, the racial and ethnic makeup of the city was 86.9% non-Hispanic white, 8.5% Black and African American, 0.8% Asian, 0.1% some other race, 1.1% two or more races, and 2.7% Hispanic and Latin American of any race. The median age among its population was 39.5, and there was a median income of $80,015, making Central one of the most wealthy communities in the Baton Rouge metropolitan area.

== Government and infrastructure ==
The municipal government only has three direct employees: the mayor, an assistant, and an administrative officer. The remainder of city services are contracted to private companies. The municipal government's only source of revenue, as of 2015, is a 2% sales tax. This was instituted at its incorporation and, since that time, had not been revised.

The school district and fire department are funded separately and instituted independent taxing districts. The city government does not pay to maintain many of the roads as they are owned by the State of Louisiana and/or East Baton Rouge Parish.

The Police Department has only a small number of officers on duty at any given time with a majority of law enforcement being done by the East Baton Rouge Sheriffs Office and the Louisiana State Police.

The Central Fire Protection District #4 operates fire stations and provides fire protection services.

East Baton Rouge Parish Emergency Medical Services provides emergency ambulance services and is operated by the city-parish.

The U.S. Postal Service operates the Central Post Office and the Greenwell Springs Post Office.

== Education ==
=== Primary and secondary schools ===
==== Public schools ====
Residents are zoned to the Central Community School System.

The city's public schools are:

- Bellingrath Hills Elementary
- Tanglewood Elementary
- Central Intermediate
- Central Middle School
- Central High School

The schools were acquired from the East Baton Rouge Parish Public Schools in 2007.

Prior to the acquisition:

- Bellingrath Hills Elementary School served a section of eastern Central. Tanglewood Elementary School served a section of western Central. Other schools serving Central included Greenbrier Elementary School, Northeast Elementary School, and White Hills Elementary School.
- Central Middle School served a large section of central Central, but other portions were zoned to other schools, including Glen Oaks Middle School and Northeast Middle School.
- Most of Central was zoned to Central High School.

==== Private schools ====
Private schools within Central's School District boundaries include:

- Central Christian Academy
- Central Private School
- St. Alphonsus Catholic School of the Roman Catholic Diocese of Baton Rouge, in Greenwell Springs - Established in 1963, its initial enrollment was 131. It now is a full K-8 school though initially it had grades 1–4.
- MTI School of Ministry
- Galilee Baptist Academy

=== Public libraries ===
East Baton Rouge Parish Library operates the Central Branch Library. Central's first library opened in the W.R. Edwards Store in 1940. The store needed room for expansion, so the library closed in 1944. It restarted activities in a permanent building in November of the following year. The library moved to a 2,604-square-foot (241.9 m^{2}) leased building on April 10, 1972. The library purchased that building in 1982. The current library, with 18,263 square feet (1,696.7 m^{2}) of space, opened in June 2002.

The Greenwell Springs Regional Branch Library is in nearby Monticello.

== Media ==
"CentralSpeaks" and "Central City News" are two of the locally produced weekly newspaper(s) in Central. The Advocate is the official journal of the city.

== Notable persons ==
- Barry Ivey, member of the Louisiana House of Representatives
- Will Hayden (in Greenwell Springs), reality TV personality and convicted felon now serving life in prison plus 40 years for sex crimes
- Tony Spell, pastor of Life Tabernacle Church in Central; during the COVID-19 pandemic, defied efforts to mitigate the spread of the virus and continued to hold church services for hundreds of the faithful; charged with six counts of violating the Governor's Executive Order barring large gatherings; charged with aggravated assault for allegedly attempting to run over a protestor with a bus
- Mack A. "Bodi" White, Jr., member of the Louisiana State Senate
