= East Baton Rouge Parish School System =

School district in Louisiana, United States

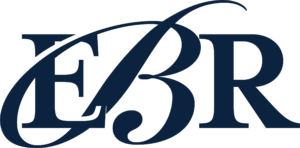

Address
- 1050 S. Foster Dr. Baton Rouge, Louisiana, 70806; United States

District information
- Type: Local school district
- Motto: One Team. One Mission
- Grades: 1-12
- Established: 1880
- Superintendent: Lamont Cole
- Schools: 83
- NCES District ID: 2200540
- District ID: LA-017

Students and staff
- Students: 40,668
- Teachers: 2,195.47 (on an FTE basis)
- Student–teacher ratio: 18.81

Other information
- Website: ebrschools.org

The East Baton Rouge Parish School System, also known as East Baton Rouge Schools (EBR Schools) or the East Baton Rouge Parish School Board, is a public school district headquartered in Baton Rouge, Louisiana, United States. The district serves most of East Baton Rouge Parish; it contains 54 elementary schools, 16 middle schools, and 18 high schools. As of the 2007–2008 school year, the EBR Public Schools district was the largest in Louisiana, and 106th in the United States. By 2026, it was second largest in the state, following the Jefferson Parish School District.

Students in the three other incorporated cities in the parish are served by separate school systems. Residents in Baker are serviced by the City of Baker School System; Zachary residents attend schools operated by the Zachary Community School Board; while Central residents attend schools in the Central Community School System. Some unincorporated areas are in the Zachary and Central districts instead of in the EBR parish district.

== Policies and programs ==
The district requires all students to wear school uniforms, except those attending Baton Rouge Magnet High School and Liberty Magnet High School.

The district also partners with The Cinderella Project of Baton Rouge, a charity that provides free prom dresses to public high school students who cannot otherwise afford them.

== List of schools ==
=== Elementary schools ===
Zoned

- Audubon Elementary School (Baton Rouge)
- Belfair Elementary School (Baton Rouge)
- Broadmoor Elementary School (Baton Rouge)
- Brownsfield Elementary School (Unincorporated area)
- Capital Elementary School (Baton Rouge)
- Cedarcrest-Southmoor Elementary School (Baton Rouge)
- Claiborne Elementary School (Baton Rouge)
- Crestworth Elementary School (Baton Rouge)
- The Dufrocq School (Baton Rouge
- Glen Oaks Park Elementary School (Unincorporated area)
- Greenbrier Elementary School (Unincorporated area)
- Highland Elementary School (Baton Rouge)
- Jefferson Terrace Elementary School (Unincorporated area)
- La Belle Aire Elementary School (Baton Rouge)
- LaSalle Elementary School (Baton Rouge)
- Magnolia Woods Elementary School (Baton Rouge)
- McKinley Elementary School (Baton Rouge)
- Melrose Elementary School (Baton Rouge)
- Merrydale Elementary School (Unincorporated area)
- Northeast Elementary School (PK-6th) (Unincorporated area)
- Park Medical Elementary School (Baton Rouge)
- Park Forest Elementary School (Baton Rouge)
- Parkview Elementary School (Baton Rouge)
- Progress Elementary School (Baton Rouge)
- Riveroaks Elementary School (Unincorporated area)
- Sharon Hills Elementary School (Unincorporated area)
- Shenandoah Elementary School (Unincorporated area)
- Twin Oaks Elementary School (Baton Rouge)
- Villa del Rey Elementary School (Baton Rouge)
- Wedgewood Elementary School (Baton Rouge)
- Westdale Heights Academic Magnet (Baton Rouge)
- Wildwood Elementary School (Baton Rouge)
- Woodlawn Elementary School (Baton Rouge)

Alternative

- Baton Rouge Center for Visual and Performing Arts (BRCVPA) (Baton Rouge)
- Baton Rouge Foreign Language Immersion Magnet (BRFLIM) (Baton Rouge)
- Forest Heights Academy of Excellence
- Mayfair Laboratory (K-8)

=== Preschool ===
- Southdowns Preschool (Baton Rouge)
- Delmont Pre-K Center (Baton Rouge)

=== Middle schools ===
Zoned

- Glasgow Middle School (Baton Rouge)
- Istrouma Middle Magnet School (Baton Rouge)
- Park Forest Middle School (Baton Rouge)
- Southeast Middle School (Baton Rouge)
- Sherwood Middle Academic Magnet School (Baton Rouge)
- Westdale Middle School (Baton Rouge)
- Woodlawn Middle School (Baton Rouge)

Alternative

- McKinley Middle Academic Magnet School of Visual & Performing Arts] (Baton Rouge)
- Scotlandville Middle Pre-Engineering Academy (Baton Rouge)
- Sherwood Middle Academic Magnet (Baton Rouge)

=== 7-12 schools ===
- Northeast High School (Unincorporated area)

=== 6-12 schools ===
- Capitol High School (Baton Rouge)

=== High schools ===
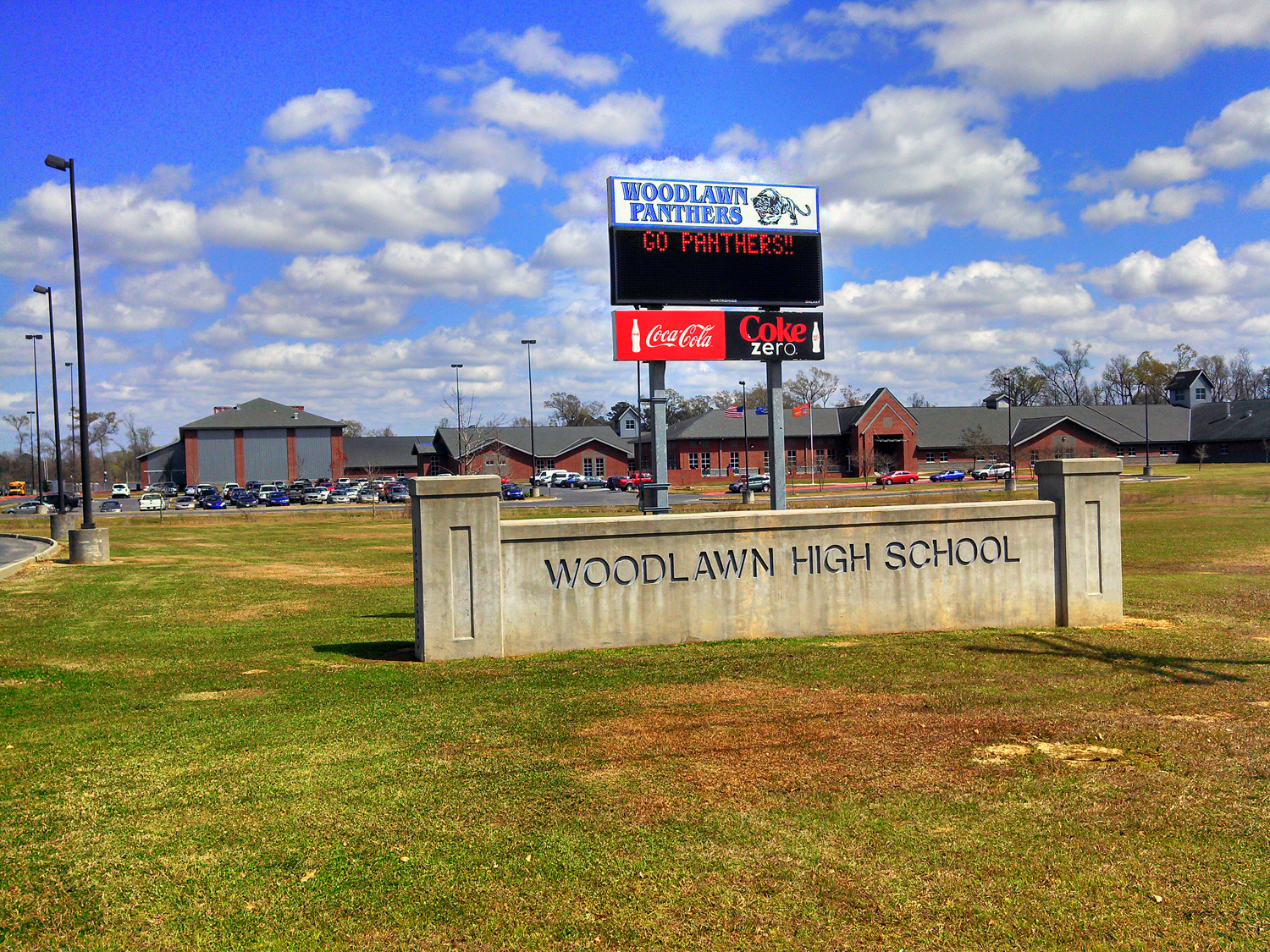
Woodlawn High School

Zoned

- Belaire High School (Baton Rouge)
- Broadmoor High School (Baton Rouge)
- Glen Oaks High School (Merrydale, Unincorporated area)
- Istrouma High School (Baton Rouge)
- McKinley Magnet High School (Baton Rouge)
- Scotlandville Magnet High School (Baton Rouge)
- Tara High School (Baton Rouge)
- Woodlawn High School (Unincorporated)

Magnet

- Baton Rouge Magnet High School (Baton Rouge)
- Liberty Magnet High School (Baton Rouge)

Alternative

- Arlington Preparatory Academy (Baton Rouge)
- East Baton Rouge Readiness Superintendent's Academy (Baton Rouge)
- East Baton Rouge Virtual Academy
- Northdale Academy (Baton Rouge)

== Former schools ==
- The following, all located in Zachary, left to join Zachary Community School Board in 2002.
  - Zachary High School
  - Northwestern Middle School
  - Copper Mill Elementary School
  - Northwestern Elementary School
  - Zachary Elementary School
- The following, all located in Central, left to join Central Community School System on July 1, 2007.
  - Bellingrath Hills Elementary School
  - Tanglewood Elementary School
  - Central Middle School
  - Central High School

== Controversies ==
In September 2022, East Baton Rouge schools excused 2,100 students from class to attend a field trip billed as a career fair and instead appeared to be a church service. The trip was criticized by parents, teachers, and students for the apparent bait-and-switch, separating the students by gender, and lecturing the female students on topics that included forgiving rapists and encouraging bullying toward transgender students.

In June 2023, WAFB reported there were 6,587 reported fights in the last two years across East Baton Rouge schools. WAFB also reported they found Instagram pages dedicated to fights at East Baton Rouge schools maintained by students. Likely even more fights happened but were not reported. EBR leaders stated they take violence seriously and will work to redress the issue.

== Notable people ==
- Buckskin Bill Black, for local children's television host; board member from 1994 to 2010
- Alfred C. Williams, state representative for East Baton Rouge Parish since 2015; board member from 2003 to 2005
