= Louisiana's congressional delegations =

Louisiana's congressional districts since 2025

These are tables of congressional delegations from Louisiana to the United States House of Representatives and the United States Senate.

The current dean of the Louisiana delegation is Representative and House Majority Leader Steve Scalise (LA-1), having served in the House since 2008.

== U.S. House of Representatives ==
=== Current members ===
List of current members, their terms in office, district boundaries, and the district political ratings according to the CPVI. The delegation has 6 members, including 4 Republicans and 2 Democrat.

Current U.S. representatives from Louisiana
District	Member (Residence)	Party	Incumbent since	CPVI (2025)	District map
1st	Steve Scalise (Jefferson)	Republican	May 3, 2008	R+19	
2nd	Troy Carter (New Orleans)	Democratic	May 11, 2021	D+17	
3rd	Clay Higgins (Lafayette)	Republican	January 3, 2017	R+22	
4th	Mike Johnson (Benton)	Republican	January 3, 2017	R+26	
5th	Julia Letlow (Start)	Republican	April 14, 2021	R+18	
6th	Cleo Fields (Baton Rouge)	Democratic	January 3, 2025	D+8	

=== 1806–1811: 1 non-voting delegate ===
The first non-voting delegate took his seat on December 1, 1806, representing Orleans Territory's at-large congressional district.

Congress	Delegate at-large
9th (1805–1807)	Daniel Clark
10th (1807–1809)	Daniel Clark
11th (1809–1811)	Julien de Lallande Poydras

=== 1812–1823: 1 seat ===
Statehood was achieved and a representative elected on April 30, 1812.

Congress	At-large seat
12th (1811–1813)	Thomas B. Robertson (DR)
13th (1813–1815)	Thomas B. Robertson (DR)
14th (1815–1817)	Thomas B. Robertson (DR)
15th (1817–1819)	Thomas B. Robertson (DR)
15th (1817–1819)	Thomas Butler (DR)
16th (1819–1821)	Thomas Butler (DR)
17th (1821–1823)	Josiah S. Johnston (DR)

=== 1823–1843: 3 seats ===
Two more seats were apportioned following the 1820 census.

Congress	1st district	2nd district	3rd district
18th (1823–1825)	Edward Livingston (DR) (Note: Supported the Jackson faction in the 1824 United States presidential election.)	Henry H. Gurley (DR) (Note: Supported the Adams-Clay faction in the 1824 United States presidential election.)	William L. Brent (DR)
19th (1825–1827)	Edward Livingston (J)	Henry H. Gurley (NR)	William L. Brent (NR)
20th (1827–1829)	Edward Livingston (J)	Henry H. Gurley (NR)	William L. Brent (NR)
21st (1829–1831)	Edward D. White Sr. (NR)	Henry H. Gurley (NR)	Walter Hampden Overton (J)
22nd (1831–1833)	Edward D. White Sr. (NR)	Philemon Thomas (J)	Henry A. Bullard (NR)
23rd (1833–1835)	Edward D. White Sr. (NR)	Philemon Thomas (J)	Henry A. Bullard (NR)
23rd (1833–1835)	Henry Johnson (W)	Philemon Thomas (J)	Rice Garland (NR)
24th (1835–1837)	Henry Johnson (W)	Eleazer W. Ripley (J)	Rice Garland (NR)
25th (1837–1839)	Henry Johnson (W)	Eleazer W. Ripley (J)	Rice Garland (W)
26th (1839–1841)	Edward D. White Sr. (W)	Thomas W. Chinn (W)	Rice Garland (W)
26th (1839–1841)	Edward D. White Sr. (W)	Thomas W. Chinn (W)	John Moore (W)
27th (1841–1843)	Edward D. White Sr. (W)	John Bennett Dawson (D)	John Moore (W)

=== 1843–1863: 4 seats ===
A fourth seat was added following the 1840 census.

Congress	1st district	2nd district	3rd district	4th district
28th (1843–1845)	John Slidell (D)	Alcée Louis la Branche (D)	John Bennett Dawson (D)	Pierre Bossier (D)
28th (1843–1845)	John Slidell (D)	Alcée Louis la Branche (D)	John Bennett Dawson (D)	Isaac E. Morse (D)
29th (1845–1847)	John Slidell (D)	Bannon G. Thibodeaux (D)	John H. Harmanson (D)	Isaac E. Morse (D)
29th (1845–1847)	Emile La Sére (D)	Bannon G. Thibodeaux (D)	John H. Harmanson (D)	Isaac E. Morse (D)
30th (1847–1849)	Emile La Sére (D)	Bannon G. Thibodeaux (D)	John H. Harmanson (D)	Isaac E. Morse (D)
31st (1849–1851)	Emile La Sére (D)	Charles Magill Conrad (W)	John H. Harmanson (D)	Isaac E. Morse (D)
31st (1849–1851)	Emile La Sére (D)	Henry A. Bullard (W)	Alexander G. Penn (D)	Isaac E. Morse (D)
32nd (1851–1853)	Louis St. Martin (D)	Joseph Aristide Landry (W)	Alexander G. Penn (D)	John Moore (W)
33rd (1853–1855)	William Dunbar (D)	Theodore G. Hunt (D)	John Perkins Jr. (D)	Roland Jones (D)
34th (1855–1857)	George Eustis Jr. (KN)	Miles Taylor (D)	Thomas G. Davidson (D)	John M. Sandidge (D)
35th (1857–1859)	George Eustis Jr. (KN)	Miles Taylor (D)	Thomas G. Davidson (D)	John M. Sandidge (D)
36th (1859–1861)	John Edward Bouligny (KN)	Miles Taylor (D)	Thomas G. Davidson (D)	John M. Landrum (D)
37th (1861–1863)	American Civil War			
37th (1861–1863)	Benjamin Flanders (U)	Michael Hahn (U)	American Civil War	

=== 1863–1873: 5 seats ===
A fifth seat was added following the 1860 census. However, the Civil War prevented them from being seated until July 18, 1868.

Congress	1st district	2nd district	3rd district	4th district	5th district
38th (1863–1865)	American Civil War				
39th (1865–1867)	American Civil War				
40th (1867–1869)	American Civil War				
40th (1867–1869)	J. Hale Sypher (R)	James Mann (D)	Joseph P. Newsham (R)	Michel Vidal (R)	W. Jasper Blackburn (R)
41st (1869–1871)	vacant	Lionel Allen; Sheldon (R)	Chester Bidwell; Darrall (R)	vacant	Frank Morey (R)
41st (1869–1871)	J. Hale Sypher (R)	Lionel Allen; Sheldon (R)	Chester Bidwell; Darrall (R)	Joseph P. Newsham (R)	Frank Morey (R)
42nd (1871–1873)	J. Hale Sypher (R)	Lionel Allen; Sheldon (R)	Chester Bidwell; Darrall (R)	James McCleery (R)	Frank Morey (R)
42nd (1871–1873)	J. Hale Sypher (R)	Lionel Allen; Sheldon (R)	Chester Bidwell; Darrall (R)	Alexander Boarman (LR)	Frank Morey (R)

=== 1873–1903: 6 seats ===
A sixth seat was added following the 1870 census. From 1873 to 1875, that extra seat was elected at-large statewide. Starting in 1875, however, the state was redistricted into six districts.

Congress	1st district	2nd district	3rd district	4th district	5th district	At-large
43rd (1873–1875)	J. Hale Sypher (R)	Lionel Allen; Sheldon (R)	Chester B. Darrall (R)	vacant	Frank Morey (R)	George A. Sheridan (LR)
43rd (1873–1875)	Effingham Lawrence (D)	Lionel Allen; Sheldon (R)	Chester B. Darrall (R)	George L. Smith (R)	Frank Morey (R)	George A. Sheridan (LR)
44th (1875–1877)	Randall L. Gibson (D)	E. John Ellis (D)	Chester B. Darrall (R)	William M. Levy (D)	Frank Morey (R)	6th district
44th (1875–1877)	Randall L. Gibson (D)	E. John Ellis (D)	Chester B. Darrall (R)	William M. Levy (D)	William B. Spencer (D)	Charles E. Nash (R)
45th (1877–1879)	Randall L. Gibson (D)	E. John Ellis (D)	Chester B. Darrall (R)	Joseph Barton; Elam (D)	John E. Leonard (R)	Edward W. Robertson (D)
45th (1877–1879)	Randall L. Gibson (D)	E. John Ellis (D)	Joseph H. Acklen (D)	Joseph Barton; Elam (D)	J. Smith Young (D)	Edward W. Robertson (D)
46th (1879–1881)	Randall L. Gibson (D)	E. John Ellis (D)	Joseph H. Acklen (D)	Joseph Barton; Elam (D)	J. Floyd King (D)	Edward W. Robertson (D)
47th (1881–1883)	Randall L. Gibson (D)	E. John Ellis (D)	Chester B. Darrall (R)	Newton C. Blanchard (D)	J. Floyd King (D)	Edward W. Robertson (D)
48th (1883–1885)	Carleton Hunt (D)	E. John Ellis (D)	William Pitt Kellogg (R)	Newton C. Blanchard (D)	J. Floyd King (D)	Edward T. Lewis (D)
49th (1885–1887)	Louis St. Martin (D)	Michael Hahn (R)	Edward J. Gay (D)	Newton C. Blanchard (D)	J. Floyd King (D)	Alfred Briggs Irion (D)
49th (1885–1887)	Louis St. Martin (D)	Nathaniel D. Wallace (D)	Edward J. Gay (D)	Newton C. Blanchard (D)	J. Floyd King (D)	Alfred Briggs Irion (D)
50th (1887–1889)	Theodore S. Wilkinson (D)	Matthew D. Lagan (D)	Edward J. Gay (D)	Newton C. Blanchard (D)	Cherubusco Newton (D)	Edward W. Robertson (D)
50th (1887–1889)	Theodore S. Wilkinson (D)	Matthew D. Lagan (D)	Edward J. Gay (D)	Newton C. Blanchard (D)	Cherubusco Newton (D)	Samuel M. Robertson (D)
51st (1889–1891)	Theodore S. Wilkinson (D)	Hamilton D. Coleman (R)	Edward J. Gay (D)	Newton C. Blanchard (D)	Charles J. Boatner (D)	Samuel M. Robertson (D)
51st (1889–1891)	Theodore S. Wilkinson (D)	Hamilton D. Coleman (R)	Andrew Price (D)	Newton C. Blanchard (D)	Charles J. Boatner (D)	Samuel M. Robertson (D)
52nd (1891–1893)	Adolph Meyer (D)	Matthew D. Lagan (D)	Andrew Price (D)	Newton C. Blanchard (D)	Charles J. Boatner (D)	Samuel M. Robertson (D)
53rd (1893–1895)	Adolph Meyer (D)	Robert C. Davey (D)	Andrew Price (D)	Henry Warren; Ogden (D)	Charles J. Boatner (D)	Samuel M. Robertson (D)
54th (1895–1897)	Adolph Meyer (D)	Charles F. Buck (D)	Andrew Price (D)	Henry Warren; Ogden (D)	Charles J. Boatner (D)	Samuel M. Robertson (D)
55th (1897–1899)	Adolph Meyer (D)	Robert C. Davey (D)	Robert F. Broussard (D)	Henry Warren; Ogden (D)	Samuel T. Baird (D)	Samuel M. Robertson (D)
56th (1899–1901)	Adolph Meyer (D)	Robert C. Davey (D)	Robert F. Broussard (D)	Phanor Breazeale (D)	Joseph E. Ransdell (D)	Samuel M. Robertson (D)
57th (1901–1903)	Adolph Meyer (D)	Robert C. Davey (D)	Robert F. Broussard (D)	Phanor Breazeale (D)	Joseph E. Ransdell (D)	Samuel M. Robertson (D)

=== 1903–1913: 7 seats ===
A seventh seat was added following the 1900 census.

Congress	District						
Congress	1st	2nd	3rd	4th	5th	6th	7th
58th (1903–1905)	Adolph; Meyer (D)	Robert C. Davey (D)	Robert F. Broussard (D)	Phanor Breazeale (D)	Joseph E. Ransdell (D)	Samuel M. Robertson (D)	Arsène; Pujo (D)
59th (1905–1907)	Adolph; Meyer (D)	Robert C. Davey (D)	Robert F. Broussard (D)	John T. Watkins (D)	Joseph E. Ransdell (D)	Samuel M. Robertson (D)	Arsène; Pujo (D)
60th (1907–1909)	Adolph; Meyer (D)	Robert C. Davey (D)	Robert F. Broussard (D)	John T. Watkins (D)	Joseph E. Ransdell (D)	George K. Favrot (D)	Arsène; Pujo (D)
60th (1907–1909)	Albert; Estopinal (D)	Samuel L. Gilmore (D)	Robert F. Broussard (D)	John T. Watkins (D)	Joseph E. Ransdell (D)	George K. Favrot (D)	Arsène; Pujo (D)
61st (1909–1911)	Albert; Estopinal (D)	Samuel L. Gilmore (D)	Robert F. Broussard (D)	John T. Watkins (D)	Joseph E. Ransdell (D)	Robert Charles; Wickliffe (D)	Arsène; Pujo (D)
61st (1909–1911)	Albert; Estopinal (D)	H. Garland; Dupré (D)	Robert F. Broussard (D)	John T. Watkins (D)	Joseph E. Ransdell (D)	Robert Charles; Wickliffe (D)	Arsène; Pujo (D)
62nd (1911–1913)	Albert; Estopinal (D)	H. Garland; Dupré (D)	Robert F. Broussard (D)	John T. Watkins (D)	Joseph E. Ransdell (D)	Robert Charles; Wickliffe (D)	Arsène; Pujo (D)
62nd (1911–1913)	Albert; Estopinal (D)	H. Garland; Dupré (D)	Robert F. Broussard (D)	John T. Watkins (D)	Joseph E. Ransdell (D)	Lewis L. Morgan (D)	Arsène; Pujo (D)

=== 1913–1993: 8 seats ===
After the 1910 census, Louisiana's delegation reached its largest size, eight seats, which it held for 80 years.

Congress	District							
Congress	1st	2nd	3rd	4th	5th	6th	7th	8th
63rd (1913–1915)	Albert; Estopinal (D)	H. Garland; Dupré (D)	Robert Broussard (D)	John T. Watkins (D)	James W. Elder (D)	Lewis L. Morgan (D)	Ladislas; Lazaro (D)	James B. Aswell (D)
64th (1915–1917)	Albert; Estopinal (D)	H. Garland; Dupré (D)	Whitmell P. Martin (Prog)	John T. Watkins (D)	Riley J. Wilson (D)	Lewis L. Morgan (D)	Ladislas; Lazaro (D)	James B. Aswell (D)
65th (1917–1919)	Albert; Estopinal (D)	H. Garland; Dupré (D)	Whitmell P. Martin (Prog)	John T. Watkins (D)	Riley J. Wilson (D)	J. Y. Sanders Sr. (D)	Ladislas; Lazaro (D)	James B. Aswell (D)
66th (1919–1921)	James; O'Connor (D)	H. Garland; Dupré (D)	Whitmell P. Martin (D)	John T. Watkins (D)	Riley J. Wilson (D)	J. Y. Sanders Sr. (D)	Ladislas; Lazaro (D)	James B. Aswell (D)
67th (1921–1923)	James; O'Connor (D)	H. Garland; Dupré (D)	Whitmell P. Martin (D)	John N. Sandlin (D)	Riley J. Wilson (D)	George K. Favrot (D)	Ladislas; Lazaro (D)	James B. Aswell (D)
68th (1923–1925)	James; O'Connor (D)	H. Garland; Dupré (D)	Whitmell P. Martin (D)	John N. Sandlin (D)	Riley J. Wilson (D)	George K. Favrot (D)	Ladislas; Lazaro (D)	James B. Aswell (D)
68th (1923–1925)	James; O'Connor (D)	James Z. Spearing (D)	Whitmell P. Martin (D)	John N. Sandlin (D)	Riley J. Wilson (D)	George K. Favrot (D)	Ladislas; Lazaro (D)	James B. Aswell (D)
69th (1925–1927)	James; O'Connor (D)	James Z. Spearing (D)	Whitmell P. Martin (D)	John N. Sandlin (D)	Riley J. Wilson (D)	Bolivar E. Kemp (D)	Ladislas; Lazaro (D)	James B. Aswell (D)
70th (1927–1929)	James; O'Connor (D)	James Z. Spearing (D)	Whitmell P. Martin (D)	John N. Sandlin (D)	Riley J. Wilson (D)	Bolivar E. Kemp (D)	René L. De Rouen (D)	James B. Aswell (D)
71st (1929–1931)	James; O'Connor (D)	James Z. Spearing (D)	Numa F. Montet (D)	John N. Sandlin (D)	Riley J. Wilson (D)	Bolivar E. Kemp (D)	René L. De Rouen (D)	James B. Aswell (D)
72nd (1931–1933)	Joachim O. Fernández (D)	Paul H. Maloney (D)	Numa F. Montet (D)	John N. Sandlin (D)	Riley J. Wilson (D)	Bolivar E. Kemp (D)	René L. De Rouen (D)	John H. Overton (D)
73rd (1933–1935)	Joachim O. Fernández (D)	Paul H. Maloney (D)	Numa F. Montet (D)	John N. Sandlin (D)	Riley J. Wilson (D)	Bolivar E. Kemp (D)	René L. De Rouen (D)	Cleveland Dear (D)
74th (1935–1937)	Joachim O. Fernández (D)	Paul H. Maloney (D)	Numa F. Montet (D)	John N. Sandlin (D)	Riley J. Wilson (D)	J. Y. Sanders Jr. (D)	René L. De Rouen (D)	Cleveland Dear (D)
75th (1937–1939)	Joachim O. Fernández (D)	Paul H. Maloney (D)	Robert L. Mouton (D)	Overton; Brooks (D)	Newt V. Mills (D)	John K. Griffith (D)	René L. De Rouen (D)	A. Leonard; Allen (D)
76th (1939–1941)	Joachim O. Fernández (D)	Paul H. Maloney (D)	Robert L. Mouton (D)	Overton; Brooks (D)	Newt V. Mills (D)	John K. Griffith (D)	René L. De Rouen (D)	A. Leonard; Allen (D)
77th (1941–1943)	F. Edward; Hébert (D)	Hale Boggs (D)	Jimmy; Domengeaux (D)	Overton; Brooks (D)	Newt V. Mills (D)	J. Y. Sanders Jr. (D)	Vance Plauché (D)	A. Leonard; Allen (D)
78th (1943–1945)	F. Edward; Hébert (D)	Paul H. Maloney (D)	Jimmy; Domengeaux (D)	Overton; Brooks (D)	Charles E. McKenzie (D)	James H. Morrison (D)	Henry D. Larcade Jr. (D)	A. Leonard; Allen (D)
79th (1945–1947)	F. Edward; Hébert (D)	Paul H. Maloney (D)	Jimmy; Domengeaux (D)	Overton; Brooks (D)	Charles E. McKenzie (D)	James H. Morrison (D)	Henry D. Larcade Jr. (D)	A. Leonard; Allen (D)
80th (1947–1949)	F. Edward; Hébert (D)	Hale Boggs (D)	Jimmy; Domengeaux (D)	Overton; Brooks (D)	Otto Passman (D)	James H. Morrison (D)	Henry D. Larcade Jr. (D)	A. Leonard; Allen (D)
81st (1949–1951)	F. Edward; Hébert (D)	Hale Boggs (D)	Edwin E. Willis (D)	Overton; Brooks (D)	Otto Passman (D)	James H. Morrison (D)	Henry D. Larcade Jr. (D)	A. Leonard; Allen (D)
82nd (1951–1953)	F. Edward; Hébert (D)	Hale Boggs (D)	Edwin E. Willis (D)	Overton; Brooks (D)	Otto Passman (D)	James H. Morrison (D)	Henry D. Larcade Jr. (D)	A. Leonard; Allen (D)
83rd (1953–1955)	F. Edward; Hébert (D)	Hale Boggs (D)	Edwin E. Willis (D)	Overton; Brooks (D)	Otto Passman (D)	James H. Morrison (D)	T. Ashton; Thompson (D)	George S. Long (D)
84th (1955–1957)	F. Edward; Hébert (D)	Hale Boggs (D)	Edwin E. Willis (D)	Overton; Brooks (D)	Otto Passman (D)	James H. Morrison (D)	T. Ashton; Thompson (D)	George S. Long (D)
85th (1957–1959)	F. Edward; Hébert (D)	Hale Boggs (D)	Edwin E. Willis (D)	Overton; Brooks (D)	Otto Passman (D)	James H. Morrison (D)	T. Ashton; Thompson (D)	George S. Long (D)
86th (1959–1961)	F. Edward; Hébert (D)	Hale Boggs (D)	Edwin E. Willis (D)	Overton; Brooks (D)	Otto Passman (D)	James H. Morrison (D)	T. Ashton; Thompson (D)	Harold B. McSween (D)
87th (1961–1963)	F. Edward; Hébert (D)	Hale Boggs (D)	Edwin E. Willis (D)	Overton; Brooks (D)	Otto Passman (D)	James H. Morrison (D)	T. Ashton; Thompson (D)	Harold B. McSween (D)
88th (1963–1965)	F. Edward; Hébert (D)	Hale Boggs (D)	Edwin E. Willis (D)	Joe; Waggonner (D)	Otto Passman (D)	James H. Morrison (D)	T. Ashton; Thompson (D)	Gillis W. Long (D)
89th (1965–1967)	F. Edward; Hébert (D)	Hale Boggs (D)	Edwin E. Willis (D)	Joe; Waggonner (D)	Otto Passman (D)	James H. Morrison (D)	T. Ashton; Thompson (D)	Speedy Long (D)
90th (1967–1969)	F. Edward; Hébert (D)	Hale Boggs (D)	Edwin E. Willis (D)	Joe; Waggonner (D)	Otto Passman (D)	John Rarick (D)	Edwin; Edwards (D)	Speedy Long (D)
91st (1969–1971)	F. Edward; Hébert (D)	Hale Boggs (D)	Patrick T. Caffery (D)	Joe; Waggonner (D)	Otto Passman (D)	John Rarick (D)	Edwin; Edwards (D)	Speedy Long (D)
92nd (1971–1973)	F. Edward; Hébert (D)	Hale Boggs (D)	Patrick T. Caffery (D)	Joe; Waggonner (D)	Otto Passman (D)	John Rarick (D)	Edwin; Edwards (D)	Speedy Long (D)
93rd (1973–1975)	F. Edward; Hébert (D)	Lindy Boggs (D)	Dave Treen (R)	Joe; Waggonner (D)	Otto Passman (D)	John Rarick (D)	John Breaux (D)	Gillis W. Long (D)
94th (1975–1977)	F. Edward; Hébert (D)	Lindy Boggs (D)	Dave Treen (R)	Joe; Waggonner (D)	Otto Passman (D)	Henson Moore (R)	John Breaux (D)	Gillis W. Long (D)
95th (1977–1979)	Rick Tonry (D)	Lindy Boggs (D)	Dave Treen (R)	Joe; Waggonner (D)	Jerry Huckaby (D)	Henson Moore (R)	John Breaux (D)	Gillis W. Long (D)
96th (1979–1981)	Bob; Livingston (R)	Lindy Boggs (D)	Dave Treen (R)	Buddy Leach (D)	Jerry Huckaby (D)	Henson Moore (R)	John Breaux (D)	Gillis W. Long (D)
97th (1981–1983)	Bob; Livingston (R)	Lindy Boggs (D)	Billy Tauzin (D)	Buddy; Roemer (D)	Jerry Huckaby (D)	Henson Moore (R)	John Breaux (D)	Gillis W. Long (D)
98th (1983–1985)	Bob; Livingston (R)	Lindy Boggs (D)	Billy Tauzin (D)	Buddy; Roemer (D)	Jerry Huckaby (D)	Henson Moore (R)	John Breaux (D)	Gillis W. Long (D)
99th (1985–1987)	Bob; Livingston (R)	Lindy Boggs (D)	Billy Tauzin (D)	Buddy; Roemer (D)	Jerry Huckaby (D)	Henson Moore (R)	John Breaux (D)	Gillis W. Long (D)
99th (1985–1987)	Bob; Livingston (R)	Lindy Boggs (D)	Billy Tauzin (D)	Buddy; Roemer (D)	Jerry Huckaby (D)	Henson Moore (R)	John Breaux (D)	Cathy Long (D)
100th (1987–1989)	Bob; Livingston (R)	Lindy Boggs (D)	Billy Tauzin (D)	Buddy; Roemer (D)	Jerry Huckaby (D)	Richard Baker (R)	Jimmy Hayes (D)	Clyde C. Holloway (R)
101st (1989–1991)	Bob; Livingston (R)	Lindy Boggs (D)	Billy Tauzin (D)	Jim McCrery (R)	Jerry Huckaby (D)	Richard Baker (R)	Jimmy Hayes (D)	Clyde C. Holloway (R)
102nd (1991–1993)	Bob; Livingston (R)	Bill Jefferson (D)	Billy Tauzin (D)	Jim McCrery (R)	Jerry Huckaby (D)	Richard Baker (R)	Jimmy Hayes (D)	Clyde C. Holloway (R)

=== 1993–2013: 7 seats ===
After the 1990 census, Louisiana lost one seat.

Congress	District						
Congress	1st	2nd	3rd	4th	5th	6th	7th
103rd (1993–1995)	Bob Livingston (R)	Bill; Jefferson (D)	Billy Tauzin (D)	Cleo Fields (D)	Jim McCrery (R)	Richard Baker (R)	Jimmy Hayes (D)
104th (1995–1997)	Bob Livingston (R)	Bill; Jefferson (D)	Billy Tauzin (R)	Cleo Fields (D)	Jim McCrery (R)	Richard Baker (R)	Jimmy Hayes (R)
105th (1997–1999)	Bob Livingston (R)	Bill; Jefferson (D)	Billy Tauzin (R)	Jim McCrery (R)	John Cooksey (R)	Richard Baker (R)	Chris John (D)
106th (1999–2001)	David Vitter (R)	Bill; Jefferson (D)	Billy Tauzin (R)	Jim McCrery (R)	John Cooksey (R)	Richard Baker (R)	Chris John (D)
107th (2001–2003)	David Vitter (R)	Bill; Jefferson (D)	Billy Tauzin (R)	Jim McCrery (R)	John Cooksey (R)	Richard Baker (R)	Chris John (D)
108th (2003–2005)	David Vitter (R)	Bill; Jefferson (D)	Billy Tauzin (R)	Jim McCrery (R)	Rodney Alexander (D)	Richard Baker (R)	Chris John (D)
109th (2005–2007)	Bobby Jindal (R)	Bill; Jefferson (D)	Charlie; Melançon (D)	Jim McCrery (R)	Rodney Alexander (R)	Richard Baker (R)	Charles; Boustany (R)
110th (2007–2009)	Bobby Jindal (R)	Bill; Jefferson (D)	Charlie; Melançon (D)	Jim McCrery (R)	Rodney Alexander (R)	Richard Baker (R)	Charles; Boustany (R)
110th (2007–2009)	Steve Scalise (R)	Bill; Jefferson (D)	Charlie; Melançon (D)	Jim McCrery (R)	Rodney Alexander (R)	Don Cazayoux (D)	Charles; Boustany (R)
111th (2009–2011)	Steve Scalise (R)	Joseph Cao (R)	Charlie; Melançon (D)	John Fleming (R)	Rodney Alexander (R)	Bill Cassidy (R)	Charles; Boustany (R)
112th (2011–2013)	Steve Scalise (R)	Cedric Richmond (D)	Jeff Landry (R)	John Fleming (R)	Rodney Alexander (R)	Bill Cassidy (R)	Charles; Boustany (R)

=== 2013–present: 6 seats ===
After the 2010 census, Louisiana lost one seat due to stagnant population growth and the loss of citizens who left the state after Hurricane Katrina and did not return.

Congress	1st district	2nd district	3rd district	4th district	5th district	6th district
113th (2013–2015)	Steve Scalise (R)	Cedric; Richmond (D)	Charles; Boustany (R)	John Fleming (R)	Rodney Alexander (R)	Bill Cassidy (R)
113th (2013–2015)	Steve Scalise (R)	Cedric; Richmond (D)	Charles; Boustany (R)	John Fleming (R)	Vance McAllister (R)	Bill Cassidy (R)
114th (2015–2017)	Steve Scalise (R)	Cedric; Richmond (D)	Charles; Boustany (R)	John Fleming (R)	Ralph Abraham (R)	Garret Graves (R)
115th (2017–2019)	Steve Scalise (R)	Cedric; Richmond (D)	Clay Higgins (R)	Mike Johnson (R)	Ralph Abraham (R)	Garret Graves (R)
116th (2019–2021)	Steve Scalise (R)	Cedric; Richmond (D)	Clay Higgins (R)	Mike Johnson (R)	Ralph Abraham (R)	Garret Graves (R)
117th (2021–2023)	Steve Scalise (R)	Cedric; Richmond (D)	Clay Higgins (R)	Mike Johnson (R)	Julia Letlow (R) (Note: Letlow's husband Luke Letlow was elected to succeed retiring Representative Ralph Abraham, but died on December 29, 2020, of COVID-19, before taking office.)	Garret Graves (R)
117th (2021–2023)	Steve Scalise (R)	Troy Carter (D)	Clay Higgins (R)	Mike Johnson (R)	Julia Letlow (R)	Garret Graves (R)
118th (2023–2025)	Steve Scalise (R)	Troy Carter (D)	Clay Higgins (R)	Mike Johnson (R)	Julia Letlow (R)	Garret Graves (R)
119th (2025–2027)	Steve Scalise (R)	Troy Carter (D)	Clay Higgins (R)	Mike Johnson (R)	Julia Letlow (R)	Cleo Fields (D)
120th (2027–2029)	Steve Scalise (R)	Troy Carter (D)	Clay Higgins (R)	Mike Johnson (R)		

== United States Senate ==
Current U.S. senators from Louisiana
Louisiana CPVI (2025): R+11	Class II senator	Class III senator
Louisiana CPVI (2025): R+11	Bill Cassidy (Senior senator) (Baton Rouge)	John Kennedy (Junior senator) (Madisonville)
Party	Republican	Republican
Incumbent since	January 3, 2015	January 3, 2017

Class II	Congress	Class III
Jean Noël Destréhan (DR)	12th (1811–1813)	Allan B. Magruder (DR)
Thomas Posey (DR)	12th (1811–1813)	Allan B. Magruder (DR)
James Brown (DR)	12th (1811–1813)	Allan B. Magruder (DR)
James Brown (DR)	13th (1813–1815)	Eligius Fromentin (DR)
James Brown (DR)	14th (1815–1817)	Eligius Fromentin (DR)
William C. C. Claiborne (DR)	15th (1817–1819)	Eligius Fromentin (DR)
Henry Johnson (DR)	15th (1817–1819)	Eligius Fromentin (DR)
Henry Johnson (DR)	16th (1819–1821)	James Brown (DR)
Henry Johnson (DR)	17th (1821–1823)	James Brown (DR)
Henry Johnson (DR)	18th (1823–1825)	James Brown (DR)
Dominique Bouligny (DR)	18th (1823–1825)	Josiah S. Johnston (DR)
Dominique Bouligny (NR)	19th (1825–1827)	Josiah S. Johnston (NR)
Dominique Bouligny (NR)	20th (1827–1829)	Josiah S. Johnston (NR)
Edward Livingston (J)	21st (1829–1831)	Josiah S. Johnston (NR)
Edward Livingston (J)	22nd (1831–1833)	Josiah S. Johnston (NR)
George A. Waggaman (NR)	22nd (1831–1833)	Josiah S. Johnston (NR)
George A. Waggaman (NR)	23rd (1833–1835)	Josiah S. Johnston (NR)
George A. Waggaman (NR)	23rd (1833–1835)	Alexander Porter (NR)
Robert C. Nicholas (J)	24th (1835–1837)	Alexander Porter (NR)
Robert C. Nicholas (J)	24th (1835–1837)	Alexandre Mouton (J)
Robert C. Nicholas (D)	25th (1837–1839)	Alexandre Mouton (D)
Robert C. Nicholas (D)	26th (1839–1841)	Alexandre Mouton (D)
Alexander Barrow (W)	27th (1841–1843)	Alexandre Mouton (D)
Alexander Barrow (W)	27th (1841–1843)	Charles Magill Conrad (W)
Alexander Barrow (W)	28th (1843–1845)	Henry Johnson (W)
Alexander Barrow (W)	29th (1845–1847)	Henry Johnson (W)
Pierre Soulé (D)	29th (1845–1847)	Henry Johnson (W)
Solomon W. Downs (D)	30th (1847–1849)	Henry Johnson (W)
Solomon W. Downs (D)	31st (1849–1851)	Pierre Soulé (D)
Solomon W. Downs (D)	32nd (1851–1853)	Pierre Soulé (D)
Judah P. Benjamin (W)	33rd (1853–1855)	Pierre Soulé (D)
Judah P. Benjamin (W)	33rd (1853–1855)	John Slidell (D)
Judah P. Benjamin (W)	34th (1855–1857)	John Slidell (D)
Judah P. Benjamin (W)	35th (1857–1859)	John Slidell (D)
Judah P. Benjamin (W)	36th (1859–1861)	John Slidell (D)
vacant	36th (1859–1861)	vacant
vacant	37th (1861–1863)	vacant
vacant	38th (1863–1865)	vacant
vacant	39th (1865–1867)	vacant
vacant	40th (1867–1869)	vacant
John S. Harris (R)	40th (1867–1869)	William Pitt Kellogg (R)
John S. Harris (R)	41st (1869–1871)	William Pitt Kellogg (R)
J. R. West (R)	42nd (1871–1873)	William Pitt Kellogg (R)
J. R. West (R)	43rd (1873–1875)	vacant
J. R. West (R)	44th (1875–1877)	vacant
J. R. West (R)	44th (1875–1877)	James B. Eustis (D)
William Pitt Kellogg (R)	45th (1877–1879)	James B. Eustis (D)
William Pitt Kellogg (R)	46th (1879–1881)	Benjamin F. Jonas (D)
William Pitt Kellogg (R)	47th (1881–1883)	Benjamin F. Jonas (D)
Randall L. Gibson (D)	48th (1883–1885)	Benjamin F. Jonas (D)
Randall L. Gibson (D)	49th (1885–1887)	James B. Eustis (D)
Randall L. Gibson (D)	50th (1887–1889)	James B. Eustis (D)
Randall L. Gibson (D)	51st (1889–1891)	James B. Eustis (D)
Randall L. Gibson (D)	52nd (1891–1893)	Edward Douglass White (D)
Donelson Caffery (D)	52nd (1891–1893)	Edward Douglass White (D)
Donelson Caffery (D)	53rd (1893–1895)	Edward Douglass White (D)
Donelson Caffery (D)	53rd (1893–1895)	Newton C. Blanchard (D)
Donelson Caffery (D)	54th (1895–1897)	Newton C. Blanchard (D)
Donelson Caffery (D)	55th (1897–1899)	Samuel D. McEnery (D)
Donelson Caffery (D)	56th (1899–1901)	Samuel D. McEnery (D)
Murphy J. Foster (D)	57th (1901–1903)	Samuel D. McEnery (D)
Murphy J. Foster (D)	58th (1903–1905)	Samuel D. McEnery (D)
Murphy J. Foster (D)	59th (1905–1907)	Samuel D. McEnery (D)
Murphy J. Foster (D)	60th (1907–1909)	Samuel D. McEnery (D)
Murphy J. Foster (D)	61st (1909–1911)	Samuel D. McEnery (D)
Murphy J. Foster (D)	61st (1909–1911)	John Thornton (D)
Murphy J. Foster (D)	62nd (1911–1913)	John Thornton (D)
Joseph E. Ransdell (D)	63rd (1913–1915)	John Thornton (D)
Joseph E. Ransdell (D)	64th (1915–1917)	Robert F. Broussard (D)
Joseph E. Ransdell (D)	65th (1917–1919)	Robert F. Broussard (D)
Joseph E. Ransdell (D)	65th (1917–1919)	Walter Guion (D)
Joseph E. Ransdell (D)	65th (1917–1919)	Edward J. Gay (D)
Joseph E. Ransdell (D)	66th (1919–1921)	Edward J. Gay (D)
Joseph E. Ransdell (D)	67th (1921–1923)	Edwin S. Broussard (D)
Joseph E. Ransdell (D)	68th (1923–1925)	Edwin S. Broussard (D)
Joseph E. Ransdell (D)	69th (1925–1927)	Edwin S. Broussard (D)
Joseph E. Ransdell (D)	70th (1927–1929)	Edwin S. Broussard (D)
Joseph E. Ransdell (D)	71st (1929–1931)	Edwin S. Broussard (D)
Huey Long (D)	72nd (1931–1933)	Edwin S. Broussard (D)
Huey Long (D)	73rd (1933–1935)	John H. Overton (D)
Huey Long (D)	74th (1935–1937)	John H. Overton (D)
Rose McConnell Long (D)	74th (1935–1937)	John H. Overton (D)
Allen J. Ellender (D)	75th (1937–1939)	John H. Overton (D)
Allen J. Ellender (D)	76th (1939–1941)	John H. Overton (D)
Allen J. Ellender (D)	77th (1941–1943)	John H. Overton (D)
Allen J. Ellender (D)	78th (1943–1945)	John H. Overton (D)
Allen J. Ellender (D)	79th (1945–1947)	John H. Overton (D)
Allen J. Ellender (D)	80th (1947–1949)	John H. Overton (D)
Allen J. Ellender (D)	80th (1947–1949)	William C. Feazel (D)
Allen J. Ellender (D)	80th (1947–1949)	Russell B. Long (D)
Allen J. Ellender (D)	81st (1949–1951)	Russell B. Long (D)
Allen J. Ellender (D)	82nd (1951–1953)	Russell B. Long (D)
Allen J. Ellender (D)	83rd (1953–1955)	Russell B. Long (D)
Allen J. Ellender (D)	84th (1955–1957)	Russell B. Long (D)
Allen J. Ellender (D)	85th (1957–1959)	Russell B. Long (D)
Allen J. Ellender (D)	86th (1959–1961)	Russell B. Long (D)
Allen J. Ellender (D)	87th (1961–1963)	Russell B. Long (D)
Allen J. Ellender (D)	88th (1963–1965)	Russell B. Long (D)
Allen J. Ellender (D)	89th (1965–1967)	Russell B. Long (D)
Allen J. Ellender (D)	90th (1967–1969)	Russell B. Long (D)
Allen J. Ellender (D)	91st (1969–1971)	Russell B. Long (D)
Allen J. Ellender (D)	92nd (1971–1973)	Russell B. Long (D)
Elaine Edwards (D)	92nd (1971–1973)	Russell B. Long (D)
J. Bennett Johnston (D)	92nd (1971–1973)	Russell B. Long (D)
J. Bennett Johnston (D)	93rd (1973–1975)	Russell B. Long (D)
J. Bennett Johnston (D)	94th (1975–1977)	Russell B. Long (D)
J. Bennett Johnston (D)	95th (1977–1979)	Russell B. Long (D)
J. Bennett Johnston (D)	96th (1979–1981)	Russell B. Long (D)
J. Bennett Johnston (D)	97th (1981–1983)	Russell B. Long (D)
J. Bennett Johnston (D)	98th (1983–1985)	Russell B. Long (D)
J. Bennett Johnston (D)	99th (1985–1987)	Russell B. Long (D)
J. Bennett Johnston (D)	100th (1987–1989)	John Breaux (D)
J. Bennett Johnston (D)	101st (1989–1991)	John Breaux (D)
J. Bennett Johnston (D)	102nd (1991–1993)	John Breaux (D)
J. Bennett Johnston (D)	103rd (1993–1995)	John Breaux (D)
J. Bennett Johnston (D)	104th (1995–1997)	John Breaux (D)
Mary Landrieu (D)	105th (1997–1999)	John Breaux (D)
Mary Landrieu (D)	106th (1999–2001)	John Breaux (D)
Mary Landrieu (D)	107th (2001–2003)	John Breaux (D)
Mary Landrieu (D)	108th (2003–2005)	John Breaux (D)
Mary Landrieu (D)	109th (2005–2007)	David Vitter (R)
Mary Landrieu (D)	110th (2007–2009)	David Vitter (R)
Mary Landrieu (D)	111th (2009–2011)	David Vitter (R)
Mary Landrieu (D)	112th (2011–2013)	David Vitter (R)
Mary Landrieu (D)	113th (2013–2015)	David Vitter (R)
Bill Cassidy (R)	114th (2015–2017)	David Vitter (R)
Bill Cassidy (R)	115th (2017–2019)	John Kennedy (R)
Bill Cassidy (R)	116th (2019–2021)	John Kennedy (R)
Bill Cassidy (R)	117th (2021–2023)	John Kennedy (R)
Bill Cassidy (R)	118th (2023–2025)	John Kennedy (R)
Bill Cassidy (R)	119th (2025–2027)	John Kennedy (R)
Julia Letlow (R)	120th (2027–2029)	John Kennedy (R)
Class II	Congress	Class III

== Key ==
Democratic (D)
Democratic-Republican (DR)
Jacksonian (J)
Know Nothing (KN)
Liberal Republican (LR)
National Republican (NR)
Progressive (Bull Moose) (Prog)
Republican (R)
Union (U)
Whig (W)

== See also ==
- List of United States congressional districts
- Louisiana's congressional districts
- Political party strength in Louisiana
