= List of United States representatives from Louisiana =

The following is an alphabetical list of United States representatives from the state of Louisiana.

== Current representatives ==
As of January 3, 2025

- 1st district: Steve Scalise (R) (since 2008)
- 2nd district: Troy Carter (D) (since 2021)
- 3rd district: Clay Higgins (R) (since 2017)
- 4th district: Mike Johnson (R) (since 2017)
- 5th district: Julia Letlow (R) (since 2021)
- 6th district: Cleo Fields (D) (since 2025)

== List of members ==
Member	Years	Party	District	Notes
Ralph Abraham	January 3, 2015 – January 3, 2021	Republican	5th	Elected in 2014. Retired.
Joseph H. Acklen	February 20, 1878 – March 3, 1881	Democratic	3rd	Won election contest. Retired.
Rodney Alexander	January 3, 2003 – August 9, 2004	Democratic	5th	Elected in 2002. Switched parties.
Rodney Alexander	August 9, 2004 – September 26, 2013	Republican	5th	Switched parties and re-elected in 2004 as a Republican. Resigned to become Secretary of the Louisiana Department of Veterans Affairs.
A. Leonard Allen	January 3, 1937 – January 3, 1953	Democratic	8th	Elected in 1936. Retired.
James Benjamin Aswell	March 4, 1913 – March 16, 1931	Democratic	8th	Elected in 1912. Died.
Samuel T. Baird	March 4, 1897 – April 22, 1899	Democratic	5th	Elected in 1896. Died.
Richard Baker	January 3, 1987 – February 2, 2008	Republican	6th	Elected in 1986. Resigned to take a lobbying position at the Managed Funds Association.
W. Jasper Blackburn	July 18, 1868 – March 3, 1869	Republican	5th	Elected to finish the vacant term. Retired to run for Lieutenant Governor.
Newton C. Blanchard	March 4, 1881 – March 12, 1894	Democratic	4th	Elected in 1880. Resigned when appointed U.S. senator.
Alexander Boarman	December 3, 1872 – March 3, 1873	Liberal Republican	4th	Elected to finish McCleery's term. Retired.
Charles J. Boatner	March 4, 1889 – March 20, 1896	Democratic	5th	Elected in 1888. House declared seat vacant after election was contested by Alexis Benoit.
Charles J. Boatner	June 10, 1896 – March 3, 1897	Democratic	5th	Elected to finish his own term. Retired.
Hale Boggs	January 3, 1941 – January 3, 1943	Democratic	2nd	Elected in 1940. Lost renomination to Maloney.
Hale Boggs	January 3, 1947 – January 3, 1973	Democratic	2nd	Elected in 1946. Presumed dead after private plane went missing over Alaska October 16, 1972. Seat declared vacant at beginning of the 93rd Congress.
Lindy Boggs	March 20, 1973 – January 3, 1991	Democratic	2nd	Elected to finish her husband's term. Retired.
Pierre Bossier	March 4, 1843 – April 24, 1844	Democratic	4th	Elected in 1842. Died.
John Edward Bouligny	March 4, 1859 – March 3, 1861	Know Nothing	1st	Elected in 1858. Seat expired at the end of the 36th Congress due to Louisiana's succession. (Note: Bouligny opposed Louisiana's secession and refused to resign his seat. He remained in Washington, D.C. during the Civil War. He never retook residency in Louisiana.)
Charles Boustany	January 3, 2005 – January 3, 2013	Republican	7th	Elected in 2004. Redistricted to the 3rd district.
Charles Boustany	January 3, 2013 – January 3, 2017	Republican	3rd	Redistricted from the 7th district and re-elected in 2012. Retired to run for U.S. senator.
John Breaux	September 30, 1972 – January 3, 1987	Democratic	7th	Elected to finish Edwards's term. Retired to run for U.S. senator.
Phanor Breazeale	March 4, 1899 – March 3, 1905	Democratic	4th	Elected in 1898. Lost renomination to Watkins.
William Leigh Brent	March 4, 1823 – March 3, 1825	Democratic-Republican (Adams-Clay)	3rd	Elected in 1822. Switched partied.
William Leigh Brent	March 4, 1825 – March 3, 1829	Anti-Jacksonian	3rd	Re-elected in 1824 as an Anti-Jacksonian. Retired.
Overton Brooks	January 3, 1937 – September 16, 1961	Democratic	4th	Elected in 1936. Died.
Robert F. Broussard	March 4, 1897 – March 3, 1915	Democratic	3rd	Elected in 1896. Retired to run for U.S. senator.
Charles F. Buck	March 4, 1895 – March 3, 1897	Democratic	2nd	Elected in 1894. Retired to run for Mayor of New Orleans.
Henry Adams Bullard	March 4, 1831 – January 4, 1834	Anti-Jacksonian	3rd	Elected in 1830. Resigned to become judge of Supreme Court of Louisiana.
Henry Adams Bullard	December 5, 1850 – March 3, 1851	Whig	2nd	Elected to finish Conrad's term. Retired.
Thomas Butler	November 16, 1818 – March 3, 1821	Democratic-Republican	At-large	Elected to finish Robertson's term. Lost renomination to Johnston.
Patrick T. Caffery	January 3, 1969 – January 3, 1973	Democratic	3rd	Elected in 1968. Retired.
Troy Carter	April 24, 2021 – present	Democratic	2nd	Elected to finish Richmond's term. Incumbent.
Joseph Cao	January 3, 2009 – January 3, 2011	Republican	2nd	Elected in 2008. Lost re-election to Richmond.
Bill Cassidy	January 3, 2009 – January 3, 2015	Republican	6th	Elected in 2008. Retired to run for U.S. senator.
Don Cazayoux	May 3, 2008 – January 3, 2009	Democratic	6th	Elected to finish Baker's term. Lost re-election to Cassidy.
Thomas Withers Chinn	March 4, 1839 – March 3, 1841	Whig	2nd	Elected in 1838. Retired.
Hamilton D. Coleman	March 4, 1889 – March 3, 1891	Republican	2nd	Elected in 1888. Lost re-election to Lagan.
Charles Magill Conrad	March 4, 1849 – August 17, 1850	Whig	2nd	Elected in 1848. Resigned to become Secretary of War.
John Cooksey	January 3, 1997 – January 3, 2003	Republican	5th	Elected in 1996. Retired to run for U.S. senator.
Chester Bidwell Darrall	March 4, 1869 – February 20, 1878	Republican	3rd	Elected in 1868. Lost election contest to Acklen.
Chester Bidwell Darrall	March 4, 1881 – March 3, 1883	Republican	3rd	Elected in 1880. Lost re-election to Kellogg.
Robert C. Davey	March 4, 1893 – March 3, 1895	Democratic	2nd	Elected in 1892. Retired.
Robert C. Davey	March 4, 1897 – December 26, 1908	Democratic	2nd	Elected in 1896. Re-elected but died before next term began.
Thomas G. Davidson	March 4, 1855 – March 3, 1861	Democratic	3rd	Elected in 1854. Withdrew due to Civil War after Louisiana seceded.
John Bennett Dawson	March 4, 1841 – March 3, 1843	Democratic	2nd	Elected in 1840. Redistricted to the 3rd district.
John Bennett Dawson	March 4, 1843– June 26, 1845	Democratic	3rd	Redistricted from the 2nd district and re-elected in 1842. Died.
René L. De Rouen	August 23, 1927 – January 3, 1941	Democratic	7th	Elected to finish Lazaro's term. Retired.
Cleveland Dear	March 4, 1933 – January 3, 1937	Democratic	8th	Elected in 1932. Retired to run for governor.
James R. Domengeaux	January 3, 1941 – April 15, 1944	Democratic	3rd	Elected in 1940. Resigned to join the Armed Forces.
James R. Domengeaux	November 7, 1944 – January 3, 1949	Democratic	3rd	Elected to finish his own term. Retired to run for U.S. senator.
William Dunbar	March 4, 1853 – March 3, 1855	Democratic	1st	Elected in 1852. Lost re-election to Eustis.
H. Garland Dupré	November 8, 1910 – February 21, 1924	Democratic	2nd	Elected to finish Gilmore's term. Died.
Edwin Edwards	October 2, 1965 – May 9, 1972	Democratic	7th	Elected to finish Thompson's term. Resigned when elected governor.
Joseph Barton Elam	March 4, 1877 – March 3, 1881	Democratic	4th	Elected in 1876. Retired.
James Walter Elder	March 4, 1913 – March 3, 1915	Democratic	5th	Elected in 1912. Lost renomination to Wilson.
E. John Ellis	March 4, 1875 – March 3, 1885	Democratic	2nd	Elected in 1874. Retired.
Albert Estopinal	November 3, 1908 – April 28, 1919	Democratic	1st	Elected to finish Meyer's term. Died.
George Eustis Jr.	March 4, 1855 – March 3, 1859	Know Nothing	1st	Elected in 1854. Retired.
George K. Favrot	March 4, 1907 – March 3, 1909	Democratic	6th	Elected in 1906. Lost renomination to Wickliffe.
George K. Favrot	March 4, 1921 – March 3, 1925	Democratic	6th	Elected in 1920. Lost renomination to Kemp.
Joachim O. Fernandez	March 4, 1931 – January 3, 1941	Democratic	1st	Elected in 1930. Lost renomination to Hébert.
Cleo Fields	January 3, 1993 – January 3, 1997	Democratic	4th	Elected in 1992. Retired.
Cleo Fields	January 3, 2025 – present	Democratic	6th	Elected in 2024. Incumbent.
Benjamin Flanders	December 3, 1862 – March 3, 1863	Union	1st	Elected in 1862. (Note: Flanders and Hahn were elected in 1862, assuming the seats left vacant after Taylor's resignation and Bouligny's term expired in 1861.); Retired.
John Fleming	January 3, 2009 – January 3, 2017	Republican	4th	Elected in 2008. Retired to run for U.S. senator.
Rice Garland	April 28, 1834 – March 3, 1837	Anti-Jacksonian	3rd	Elected to finish Bullard's term. Switched parties.
Rice Garland	March 4, 1837 – July 21, 1840	Whig	3rd	Re-elected in 1836 as a Whig. Resigned to become judge of Supreme Court of Louisiana.
Edward J. Gay	March 4, 1885 – May 30, 1889	Democratic	3rd	Elected in 1884. Died.
Randall L. Gibson	March 4, 1875 – March 3, 1883	Democratic	1st	Elected in 1874. Retired to run for U.S. senator.
Samuel Louis Gilmore	March 30, 1909 – July 18, 1910	Democratic	2nd	Elected to finish Davey's term. Died.
Garret Graves	January 3, 2015 – January 3, 2025	Republican	6th	Elected in 2014. Retired.
John K. Griffith	January 3, 1937 – January 3, 1941	Democratic	6th	Elected in 1936. Lost renomination to Sanders Jr.
Henry Hosford Gurley	March 4, 1823 – March 3, 1825	Democratic-Republican (Adams-Clay)	2nd	Elected in 1822. Switched parties.
Henry Hosford Gurley	March 4, 1825 – March 3, 1831	Anti-Jacksonian	2nd	Re-elected in 1824 as an Anti-Jacksonian. Retired.
Michael Hahn	December 3, 1862 – March 3, 1863	Union	2nd	Elected in 1862. Retired.
Michael Hahn	March 4, 1885 – March 15, 1886	Republican	2nd	Elected in 1884. Died.
John H. Harmanson	??, 1845 – October 24, 1850	Democratic	3rd	Elected to finish Dawson's term. Died.
Jimmy Hayes	January 3, 1987 – December 1, 1995	Democratic	7th	Elected in 1986. Switched parties.
Jimmy Hayes	December 1, 1995 – January 3, 1997	Republican	7th	Switched parties. Retired to run for U.S. senator.
F. Edward Hébert	January 3, 1941 – January 3, 1977	Democratic	1st	Elected in 1940. Retired.
Clay Higgins	January 3, 2017 – present	Republican	3rd	Elected in 2016. Incumbent.
Clyde C. Holloway	January 3, 1987 – January 3, 1993	Republican	8th	Elected in 1986. Redistricted to the 6th district and lost re-election to Baker.
Jerry Huckaby	January 3, 1977 – January 3, 1993	Democratic	5th	Elected in 1976. Lost re-election to McCrery after redistricting placed them in the same district.
Carleton Hunt	March 4, 1883 – March 3, 1885	Democratic	1st	Elected in 1882. Retired.
Theodore Gaillard Hunt	March 4, 1853 – March 3, 1855	Whig	2nd	Elected in 1852. Lost re-election to Taylor as a Know Nothing candidate.
Alfred Briggs Irion	March 4, 1885 – March 3, 1887	Democratic	6th	Elected in 1884. Lost renomination to E. Robertson.
William J. Jefferson	January 3, 1991 – January 3, 2009	Democratic	2nd	Elected in 1990. Lost re-election to Cao.
Bobby Jindal	January 3, 2005 – January 14, 2008	Republican	1st	Elected in 2004. Resigned when elected governor.
Chris John	January 3, 1997 – January 3, 2005	Democratic	7th	Elected in 1996. Retired to run for U.S. senator.
Henry Johnson	December 1, 1834 – March 3, 1837	Anti-Jacksonian	1st	Elected to finish White's term. Switched parties.
Henry Johnson	March 4, 1837 – March 3, 1839	Whig	1st	Re-elected in 1836 as a Whig. Retired to run for governor.
Josiah S. Johnston	March 4, 1821 – March 3, 1823	Democratic-Republican	At-large	Elected in 1820. Redistricted to the 3rd district and lost re-election.
Mike Johnson	January 3, 2017 – present	Republican	4th	Elected in 2016. Incumbent.
Roland Jones	March 4, 1853 – March 3, 1855	Democratic	4th	Elected in 1852. Retired.
William P. Kellogg	March 4, 1883 – March 3, 1885	Republican	3rd	Elected in 1882. Lost re-election to Gay.
Bolivar E. Kemp	March 4, 1925 – June 19, 1933	Democratic	6th	Elected in 1924. Died.
J. Floyd King	March 4, 1879 – March 3, 1887	Democratic	5th	Elected in 1878. Lost renomination to Newton.
Alcée Louis la Branche	March 4, 1843 – March 3, 1845	Democratic	2nd	Elected in 1842. Retired.
Emile La Sére	January 26, 1846 – March 3, 1851	Democratic	1st	Elected to finish Slidell's term. Retired.
Matthew D. Lagan	March 4, 1887 – March 3, 1889	Democratic	2nd	Elected in 1886. Retired.
Matthew D. Lagan	March 4, 1891 – March 3, 1893	Democratic	2nd	Elected in 1890. Retired.
John M. Landrum	March 4, 1859 – March 3, 1861	Democratic	4th	Elected in 1858. Vacated seat due to Civil War after Louisiana seceded.
Jeff Landry	January 3, 2011 – January 3, 2013	Republican	3rd	Elected in 2010. Lost re-election to Boustany after the 7th district was eliminated and Boustany's home was drawn into the 3rd.
Joseph Aristide Landry	March 4, 1851 – March 3, 1853	Whig	2nd	Elected in 1850. Retired.
Henry D. Larcade Jr.	January 3, 1943 – January 3, 1953	Democratic	7th	Elected in 1942. Retired.
Effingham Lawrence	March 3, 1875 – March 4, 1875	Democratic	1st	Won contested 1872 election. (Note: Sypher's 1872 re-election was successfully contested by Lawrence. Lawrence won, but only after the original returns were certified in Sypher's favor. After protracted court intervention, Lawrence was declared elected, but just one day (March 3, 1875) remained in the term.); Lost re-election to Gibson.
Ladislas Lazaro	March 4, 1913 – March 30, 1927	Democratic	7th	Elected in 1912. Died.
Claude Leach	January 3, 1979 – January 3, 1981	Democratic	4th	Elected in 1978. Lost re-election to Roemer.
John E. Leonard	March 4, 1877 – March 3, 1878	Republican	5th	Elected in 1876. Died.
Julia Letlow	March 20, 2021 – present	Republican	5th	Elected to begin the term of her husband, Luke Letlow, who died before taking office. Incumbent.
William M. Levy	March 4, 1875 – March 3, 1877	Democratic	4th	Elected in 1874. Lost renomination to Elam.
Edward T. Lewis	March 4, 1883 – March 3, 1885	Democratic	6th	Elected to finish member-elect Andrew Herron's term. Lost renomination to Irion.
Bob Livingston	August 27, 1977 – March 1, 1999	Republican	1st	Elected to finish Tonry's term. Resigned following revelations of his extramarital affair.
Edward Livingston	March 4, 1823 – March 3, 1825	Democratic-Republican (Jackson)	1st	Elected in 1822. Switched parties.
Edward Livingston	March 4, 1825 – March 3, 1829	Jacksonian	1st	Re-elected in 1824 as a Jacksonian. Retired to run for U.S. senator.
Catherine S. Long	March 30, 1985 – January 3, 1987	Democratic	8th	Elected to finish her husband's term. Retired.
George S. Long	January 3, 1953 – March 22, 1958	Democratic	8th	Elected in 1952. Died.
Gillis W. Long	January 3, 1963 – January 3, 1965	Democratic	8th	Elected in 1962. Lost renomination to S. Long.
Gillis W. Long	January 3, 1973 – January 20, 1985	Democratic	8th	Elected in 1972. Died.
Speedy O. Long	January 3, 1965 – January 3, 1973	Democratic	8th	Elected in 1964. Retired when redistricted.
Paul H. Maloney	March 4, 1931 – December 15, 1940	Democratic	2nd	Elected in 1930. Lost renomination to Boggs and resigned to become collector of internal revenue for the New Orleans district.
Paul H. Maloney	January 3, 1943 – January 3, 1947	Democratic	2nd	Elected in 1942. Retired.
James Mann	July 18, 1868 - August 26, 1868	Democratic	2nd	Elected to finish the vacant term. Died.
Whitmell P. Martin	March 4, 1915 – March 3, 1919	Progressive	3rd	Elected in 1914. Swirtched parties.
Whitmell P. Martin	March 4, 1919 – April 6, 1929	Democratic	3rd	Re-elected in 1918 as a Democrat. Died.
Vance McAllister	November 16, 2013 – January 3, 2015	Republican	5th	Elected to finish Alexander's term. Lost re-election to Abraham.
James McCleery	March 4, 1871 – November 5, 1871	Republican	4th	Elected in 1870. Died.
Jim McCrery	April 16, 1988 – January 3, 1993	Republican	4th	Elected to finish Roemer's term. Redistricted to the 5th district.
Jim McCrery	January 3, 1993 – January 3, 1997	Republican	5th	Redistricted from the 4th district and re-elected in 1992. Redistricted to the 4th district.
Jim McCrery	January 3, 1997 – January 3, 2009	Republican	4th	Redistricted from the 5th district and re-elected in 1996. Retired.
Charles E. McKenzie	January 3, 1943 – January 3, 1947	Democratic	5th	Elected in 1942. Lost renomination to Passman.
Harold B. McSween	January 3, 1959 – January 3, 1963	Democratic	8th	Elected in 1958. Lost renomination to G. Long.
Charlie Melançon	January 3, 2005 – January 3, 2011	Democratic	3rd	Elected in 2004. Retired to run for U.S. senator.
Adolph Meyer	March 4, 1891 – March 8, 1908	Democratic	1st	Elected in 1890. Died.
Newt V. Mills	January 3, 1937 – January 3, 1943	Democratic	5th	Elected in 1936. Lost renomination to McKenzie.
Numa F. Montet	August 6, 1929 – January 3, 1937	Democratic	3rd	Elected to finish Martin's term. Lost renomination to Mouton.
Henson Moore	January 3, 1975 – January 3, 1987	Republican	6th	Elected in 1974. Retired to run for U.S. senator.
John Moore	December 17, 1840 – March 3, 1843	Whig	3rd	Elected to finish Garland's term. Lost re-election to Dawson.
John Moore	March 4, 1851 – March 3, 1853	Whig	4th	Elected in 1850. Retired.
Frank Morey	March 4, 1869 – June 8, 1876	Republican	5th	Elected in 1868. Lost contested election to Spencer.
Lewis L. Morgan	November 5, 1912 – March 3, 1917	Democratic	6th	Elected to finish Wickliffe's term. Retired.
James H. Morrison	January 3, 1943 – January 3, 1967	Democratic	6th	Elected in 1942. Lost renomination to Rarick.
Isaac Edward Morse	December 2, 1844 – March 3, 1851	Democratic	4th	Elected to finish Bossier's term. Lost re-election to J. Moore.
Robert L. Mouton	January 3, 1937 – January 3, 1941	Democratic	3rd	Elected in 1936. Lost renomination to Domengeaux.
Charles E. Nash	March 4, 1875 – March 3, 1877	Republican	6th	Elected in 1874. Lost re-election to E. Robertson.
Joseph P. Newsham	July 18, 1868 – March 3, 1869	Republican	3rd	Elected to finish the vacant term. Redistricted to the 4th district.
Joseph P. Newsham	May 23, 1870 – March 4, 1871	Republican	4th	Successfully contested 1868 election of Michael Ryan. Retired.
Cherubusco Newton	March 4, 1887 – March 3, 1889	Democratic	5th	Elected in 1886. Lost renomination to Boatner.
James O'Connor	June 5, 1919 – March 3, 1931	Democratic	1st	Elected to finish Estopinal's term. Lost renomination to Fernandez.
Henry W. Ogden	May 12, 1894 – March 3, 1899	Democratic	4th	Elected to finish Blanchard's term. Retired.
John H. Overton	May 12, 1931 – March 3, 1933	Democratic	8th	Elected to finish Aswell's term. Retired to run for U.S. senator.
Walter Hampden Overton	March 4, 1829 – March 3, 1831	Jacksonian	3rd	Elected in 1828. Retired.
Otto Passman	January 3, 1947 – January 3, 1977	Democratic	5th	Elected in 1946. Lost renomination to Huckaby.
Alexander G. Penn	December 30, 1850 – March 3, 1853	Democratic	3rd	Elected to finish Harmanson's term. Retired.
John Perkins Jr.	March 4, 1853 – March 3, 1855	Democratic	3rd	Elected in 1852. Retired.
Vance Plauché	January 3, 1941 – January 3, 1943	Democratic	7th	Elected in 1940. Retired.
Andrew Price	December 2, 1889 – March 3, 1897	Democratic	3rd	Elected to finish Gay's term. Retired.
Arsène Pujo	March 4, 1903 – March 3, 1913	Democratic	7th	Elected in 1902. Retired.
Joseph E. Ransdell	August 29, 1899 – March 3, 1913	Democratic	5th	Elected to finish Baird's term. Retired to run for U.S. senator.
John Rarick	January 3, 1967 – January 3, 1975	Democratic	6th	Elected in 1966. Lost renomination to Jeff La Caze.
Cedric Richmond	January 3, 2011 – January 15, 2021	Democratic	2nd	Elected in 2010. Resigned to become Senior Advisor to the President.
Eleazar W. Ripley	March 4, 1835 – March 3, 1837	Jacksonian	2nd	Elected in 1834. Switched parties.
Eleazar W. Ripley	March 4, 1837 – March 2, 1839	Democratic	2nd	Re-elected in 1836 as a Democrat. Retired but died before next term began.
Edward White Robertson	March 4, 1877 – March 3, 1883	Democratic	6th	Elected in 1876. Lost renomination to Lewis.
Edward White Robertson	March 4, 1887 - August 2, 1887	Democratic	6th	Elected in 1886. Died.
Samuel Matthews Robertson	December 5, 1887 – March 3, 1907	Democratic	6th	Elected to finish his father's term. Lost renomination to Favrot.
Thomas B. Robertson	April 30, 1812 – April 20, 1818	Democratic-Republican	At-large	Elected to finish the vacant term. Resigned.
Buddy Roemer	January 3, 1981 – March 14, 1988	Democratic	4th	Elected in 1980. Resigned when elected governor.
Jared Y. Sanders Jr.	May 1, 1934 – January 3, 1937	Democratic	6th	Elected to finish Kemp's term. Re-elected in 1934. Lost renomination to Griffith.
Jared Y. Sanders Jr.	January 3, 1941 – January 3, 1943	Democratic	6th	Elected in 1940. Lost renomination to Morrison.
Jared Y. Sanders Sr.	March 4, 1917 – March 3, 1921	Democratic	6th	Elected in 1916. Retired.
John M. Sandidge	March 4, 1855 – March 3, 1859	Democratic	4th	Elected in 1854. Retired.
John N. Sandlin	March 4, 1921 – January 3, 1937	Democratic	4th	Elected in 1920. Retired to run for U.S. Senator.
Steve Scalise	May 3, 2008 – present	Republican	1st	Elected to finish Jindal's term. Incumbent.
Lionel Allen Sheldon	March 4, 1869 – March 3, 1875	Republican	2nd	Elected in 1868. Lost re-election to Ellis.
George A. Sheridan	March 4, 1873 – March 3, 1875	Liberal Republican	At-large	Elected in 1872. Retired.
John Slidell	March 4, 1843 – November 10, 1845	Democratic	1st	Elected in 1842. Resigned.
George Luke Smith	November 24, 1873 – March 3, 1875	Republican	4th	Elected to finish representative-elect Peters's term. Lost re-election to Levy.
James Z. Spearing	April 22, 1924 – March 3, 1931	Democratic	2nd	Elected to finish Deupré's term. Lost renomination to Maloney.
William B. Spencer	June 8, 1876 – January 8, 1877	Democratic	5th	Won contested election. Retired and resigned to become associate justice of the Louisiana Supreme Court.
Louis St. Martin	March 4, 1851 – March 3, 1853	Democratic	1st	Elected in 1850. Retired.
Louis St. Martin	March 4, 1885 – March 3, 1887	Democratic	1st	Elected in 1884. Retired.
J. Hale Sypher	July 18, 1868 – March 3, 1875	Republican	1st	Elected to finish the vacant term. (Note: There were so many irregularities in the 1868 election that Congress threw it out. Sypher won the second round against St. Martin.); Term expired during election contest.
Billy Tauzin	May 22, 1980 – August 8, 1995	Democratic	3rd	Elected to finish Treen's term. Switched parties.
Billy Tauzin	August 8, 1995 – January 3, 2005	Republican	3rd	Switched parties and re-elected in 1996 as a Republican. Retired.
Miles Taylor	March 4, 1855 – February 5, 1861	Democratic	2nd	Elected in 1854. Withdrew due to Civil War.
Bannon G. Thibodeaux	March 4, 1845 – March 3, 1849	Democratic	2nd	Elected in 1844. Retired.
Philemon Thomas	March 4, 1831 – March 3, 1835	Jacksonian	2nd	Elected in 1830. Retired.
T. Ashton Thompson	January 3, 1953 – July 1, 1965	Democratic	7th	Elected in 1952. Died.
Richard A. Tonry	January 3, 1977 - May 4, 1977	Democratic	1st	Elected in 1976. Resigned after conviction for vote-buying.
David C. Treen	January 3, 1973 – March 10, 1980	Republican	3rd	Elected in 1972. Resigned when elected governor.
Michel Vidal	July 18, 1868 – March 3, 1869	Republican	4th	Elected to finish the vacant term. Retired to become U.S. consul to Tripoli, Libya.
David Vitter	May 29, 1999 – January 3, 2005	Republican	1st	Elected to finish Livingston's term. Retired to run for U.S. senator.
Joe Waggonner	December 19, 1961 – January 3, 1979	Democratic	4th	Elected to finish Brooks's term. Retired.
Nathaniel D. Wallace	December 9, 1886 – March 3, 1887	Democratic	2nd	Elected to finish Hahn's term. Retired.
John T. Watkins	March 4, 1905 – March 3, 1921	Democratic	4th	Elected in 1904. Lost renomination to Sandlin.
Edward D. White Sr.	March 4, 1829 – November 15, 1834	Anti-Jacksonian	1st	Elected in 1828. Retired to run for governor and resigned when elected.
Edward D. White Sr.	March 4, 1839 – March 3, 1843	Whig	1st	Elected in 1838. Retired.
Robert Charles Wickliffe	March 4, 1909 – June 11, 1912	Democratic	6th	Elected in 1908. Died.
Theodore S. Wilkinson	March 4, 1887 – March 3, 1891	Democratic	1st	Elected in 1886. Retired.
Edwin E. Willis	January 3, 1949 – January 3, 1969	Democratic	3rd	Elected in 1948. Lost renomination to Caffery.
Riley J. Wilson	March 4, 1915 – January 3, 1937	Democratic	5th	Elected in 1914. Lost renomination to Mills.
J. Smith Young	November 5, 1878 – March 3, 1879	Democratic	5th	Elected to finish Leonard's term. Retired.

== See also ==
- List of United States senators from Louisiana
- Louisiana's congressional delegations
- Louisiana's congressional districts
