= 1904 United States House of Representatives elections in Louisiana =

United States House of Representatives elections in Louisiana, 1904
- November 8, 1904

All 7 Louisiana seats to the United States House of Representatives
	Majority party	Minority party
Party	Democratic	Republican
Last election	7	0
Seats won	7	0
Seat change	Steady	Steady
Popular vote	47,389	4,632
Percentage	90.25%	8.82%

The 1904 United States House of Representatives elections in Louisiana were held on November 8, 1904, to elect the seven members from Louisiana to the United States House of Representatives. Democratic dominance in Louisiana politics continued, with Democrats winning all seats.

== Overview ==
United States House of Representatives elections in Louisiana, 1904
Party	Votes	Percentage	Seats	+/–
Democratic	47,389	90.25%	7	—
Republican	4,632	8.82%	0	—
Socialist	412	0.78%	0	—
Write-ins	74	0.14%	0	—
Totals	52,507	100.00%	7	—

== District 1 ==
Incumbent Democratic Congressman Adolph Meyer, who was first elected in 1890, ran for re-election to a sixth term. He was challenged by Hugh Suthon, the Republican nominee and Superintendent of the New Orleans Mint, and by Socialist nominee John R. Hoy, and won in a landslide.

Louisiana 1st congressional district election, 1904
Party	Candidate	Votes	%
Democratic	Adolph Meyer (inc.)	9,158	89.83
Republican	Hugh S. Suthon	791	7.76
Socialist	John R. Hoy	246	2.41
Total votes		10,195	100.0
Turnout			
Democratic hold			

== District 2 ==
Incumbent Democratic Congressman Robert C. Davey ran for re-election to his fourth consecutive term, and fifth term overall. He faced Republican nominee George H. Vennard and Socialist nominee C. A. Eastman, both of whom he easily defeated.

Louisiana's 2nd congressional district election, 1904
Party	Candidate	Votes	%
Democratic	Robert C. Davey (inc.)	9,786	91.03
Republican	George H. Vennard	798	7.42
Socialist	C. A. Eastman	166	1.54
Total votes		10,750	100.0
Turnout			
Democratic hold			

== District 3 ==
Incumbent Democratic Congressman Robert F. Broussard ran for re-election to a fourth term. He was challenged by Republican nominee Henry Pharr, the son of John Pharr, the Republican-Populist nominee in the 1896 gubernatorial election. Broussard won re-election easily.

Louisiana's 3rd congressional district election, 1904
Party	Candidate	Votes	%
Democratic	Robert F. Broussard (inc.)	5,649	84.48
Republican	Henry N. Pharr	1,038	15.52
Total votes		6,687	100.0
Turnout			
Democratic hold			

== District 4 ==
Incumbent Democratic Congressman Phanor Breazeale ran for re-election to an eighth term, but was defeated in the primary by Bossier Parish district court judge John T. Watkins. In the general election, Watkins was elected unopposed.

Louisiana's 4th congressional district election, 1904
Party	Candidate	Votes	%
Democratic	John T. Watkins	6,266	99.07
Write-ins		59	0.93
Total votes		6,325	100.0
Turnout			
Democratic hold			

== District 5 ==
Incumbent Democratic Congressman Joseph E. Ransdell ran for re-election to his fourth term in Congress. In the general election, he faced Republican nominee H. B. Taliaferro, and won in a landslide.

Louisiana's 5th congressional district election, 1904
Party	Candidate	Votes	%
Democratic	Joseph E. Ransdell (inc.)	5,747	277
Republican	H. B. Taliaferro, Sr.	277	4.60
Total votes		6,024	100.0
Turnout			
Democratic hold			

== District 6 ==
Incumbent Democratic Congressman Samuel M. Robertson, who was first elected in an 1887 special election, ran for re-election to his tenth term. He was challenged by L. E. Bentley, a special deputy collector at the Port of New Orleans. Robertson defeated Bentley in a landslide.

Louisiana 6th congressional district election, 1904
Party	Candidate	Votes	%
Democratic	Samuel M. Robertson (inc.)	5,351	88.13
Republican	L. E. Bentley	721	11.87
Total votes		6,072	100.0
Turnout			
Democratic hold			

== District 7 ==
Incumbent Democratic Congressman Arsène Pujo ran for re-election to his second term. He was challenged by Joseph Lassalle, the Republican nominee, and defeated him in a landslide.

Louisiana's 7th congressional district election, 1904
Party	Candidate	Votes	%
Democratic	Arsène Pujo (inc.)	5,432	84.16
Republican	Joseph Lassalle	1,007	15.60
Write-ins		15	0.23
Total votes		6,454	100.0
Turnout			
Democratic hold			

== See also ==
- 59th United States Congress
- Political party strength in Louisiana
- Political party strength in U.S. states
- 1904 United States House of Representatives elections
