= Louisiana's 1st congressional district =

U.S. House district for Louisiana

Coordinates: 29°39′59″N 89°53′34″W

- Interactive map of district boundaries
- Representative: Steve Scalise; R–Jefferson
- Distribution: 86.02% urban; 13.98% rural
- Population (2025): 787,464
- Median household income: $84,600
- Ethnicity: 69.0% White; 12.1% Black; 11.7% Hispanic; 3.8% Two or more races; 2.3% Asian; 1.1% other
- Cook PVI: R+19

Louisiana's 1st congressional district is a congressional district in the U.S. state of Louisiana. The district comprises land from the northern shore of Lake Pontchartrain south to the Mississippi River Delta. It covers most of New Orleans' suburbs, as well as a sliver of New Orleans itself.

The district is currently represented by Republican House majority leader Steve Scalise.

== History ==
Since at least the 1840s, the 1st congressional district has been anchored in and around most of the Greater New Orleans area south of Lake Pontchartrain, with the district being anchored in most of the city itself, as well as the adjoining parishes of St. Bernard and Plaquemines, during most of the tenure of F. Edward Hébert, a former journalist for The Times-Picayune who represented the district for a record 18 terms from 1941 until his retirement in 1977, eventually serving as Chairman of the House Armed Services Committee from 1971 to 1975. While largely a Democratic district for most of its existence, with Louisiana being part of the Solid South during this era, the district eventually became friendlier to Republicans as many conservative Democrats began to increasingly vote Republican (or at least against the Democratic presidential nominee), with the district even giving a plurality of the vote to George Wallace in 1968.

In the 1970s round of redistricting, the Louisiana State Legislature (in complying with the Voting Rights Act of 1965, particularly the opportunity of racial minorities to elect a representative of their choosing) redrew the neighboring 2nd District, which previously contained most of the western parts of New Orleans as well as the Westbank suburbs (on the west side of the Mississippi River, hence the term) in neighboring Jefferson Parish, into a majority African American district. In exchange, the 1st District would now extend to the Northshore area (the Florida Parishes north of Lake Pontchartrain) for the first time, adding St. Tammany Parish which had been amongst the first areas of Louisiana to turn Republican in the post-World War II era. Accordingly, the new 1st gave Republican President Richard Nixon over 70 percent of the vote in his 1972 reelection, though it did give a narrow majority to Democrat Jimmy Carter in 1976. That same year, longtime incumbent Hébert retired from Congress, and was succeeded by State Representative and fellow Democrat Richard Tonry, who narrowly won the election that year over Republican assistant state attorney general Bob Livingston.

However, Tonry would quickly become the subject of a federal corruption investigation, including allegations of ballot stuffing in St. Bernard Parish as well as illegal campaign contributions, eventually pleading guilty, serving a six-month prison sentence and resigning from Congress after only four months in May 1977. In the ensuing special election, Livingston would defeat Democratic State Representative Ron Faucheux (who himself defeated Tonry in his party's primary for the special election), becoming the first Republican to represent the district as well as a large portion of New Orleans since Reconstruction; the district would also narrowly vote for Ronald Reagan in the 1980 presidential election.

In the 1980s round of redistricting, the district shed virtually all of its precincts outside of New Orleans and Jefferson and St. Tammany parishes, with a mid-decade redistricting in 1984 making the district even more Republican. In particular, several central and eastern portions of New Orleans that were becoming increasingly African American and Democratic (including in particular New Orleans East, which would be adversely affected by the 1980s oil glut and the ensuing demographic changes that affected property values and crime rates there) were moved to the majority African American 2nd District. In exchange, the 1st added several heavily Republican areas of Jefferson Parish from the 3rd District (including the East Bank suburbs of Metairie and Kenner, as well as most of the Westbank suburbs including Terrytown, Estelle and Avondale) that not unlike St. Tammany Parish experienced a similar trend towards the GOP after World War II. The newly redrawn 1st was now almost entirely suburban. Livingston (who himself would relocate from New Orleans to Metairie following the 1984 redistricting) would go on to win this district by margins of 80 percent or higher, doing so in some cases unopposed, as the 1st became the most heavily Republican district in Louisiana and one of the most heavily Republican districts in the nation. President Reagan won more than 77 percent of the vote in the district in 1984, followed by 71 percent in 1988 for George H. W. Bush, who himself accepted his party's presidential nomination at the Republican National Convention held that year in New Orleans at the Louisiana Superdome.

In the 1990s round of redistricting, the district was pushed deeper into the Florida Parishes, gaining Washington and most of Tangipahoa parishes from the 6th District, in addition to the same core of Saint Tammany Parish, most of Jefferson Parish and a northwestern portion of New Orleans centered on the Lakeview neighborhood (long considered one of the more Republican areas of the heavily Democratic city) associated with the district since the 1970s. During this decade, Livingston rose to become Chairman of the powerful House Appropriations Committee following the Republican takeover of the House of Representatives following the 1994 elections, and in 1996 the 1st District would be the only district in Louisiana to vote for Bob Dole (who would also be the last Republican to lose Louisiana in a presidential election as of 2025). After Livingston resigned from Congress in 1999 following a short-lived bid for Speaker of the House that unraveled upon revelations of an extramarital affair from years past, the district would remain in Republican hands, electing State Representative David Vitter to succeed Livingston.

In the 2000s round of redistricting, the district would become equally divided on both sides of Lake Pontchartrain, connected only by the Lake Pontchartrain Causeway, with the slightly larger northern half consisting of the Florida Parishes of St. Tammany, Tangipahoa and Washington and the southern half consisting of most of Jefferson Parish, along with the Lakeview area of New Orleans carried over from the previous district and a section of St. Charles Parish extending as far west as Destrehan. With the smallest percentage of African Americans amongst Louisiana's then-delegation of seven congressional districts, the district retained its status as the most Republican district in the state, giving over 70 percent of the vote to George W. Bush in 2004 and 72 percent to John McCain in 2008. Two of the district's representatives would eventually move up to higher office, with Vitter becoming the first Republican to be popularly elected to the Senate from Louisiana (and the first Republican Senator from the state since Reconstruction) in 2004 and Vitter's successor Bobby Jindal (also a Republican) being elected Governor of Louisiana in 2007. Jindal's successor, Republican Steve Senator Steve Scalise, would be elected in 2008 to succeed Jindal.

In 2012, following the 2010s round of redistricting which saw Louisiana lose a congressional seat due to population declines in the wake of Hurricane Katrina (which caused massive flooding and population displacement in the Greater New Orleans area), the district shed Washington and most of Tangipahoa parishes in the Northshore, while gaining back St. Bernard and Plaquemines parishes for the first time since the early 1980s, and also gaining most of Lafourche Parish and southern Terrebonne Parish (historically associated with the previous 3rd District, which had been eliminated and combined with the old 7th district) for the first time. Following the 2012 election, Scalise would be elected as Chairman of the powerful Republican Study Committee, eventually rising to House Majority Whip after the 2014 elections, becoming House Minority Whip after the GOP lost control of the House in the 2018 elections, and eventually House Majority Leader after the 2022 elections.

Throughout Scalise's time as the district's representative, the district has remained solidly Republican, giving more than two-thirds of the vote to Donald Trump in all three of his presidential elections between 2016 and 2024, with unprecedented Republican support in more rural areas of the district balancing out slight underperformances in more historically Republican suburban parts of the district during the Trump era. The district also voted twice against Democrat John Bel Edwards (who hails from just outside the district in Tangipahoa Parish) in both his successful election as Governor in 2015 and his reelection in 2019, with the 1st being the only district in Louisiana to vote for Edwards' Republican challenger, then-U.S. Senator and former 1st District representative David Vitter, in the former election.

As of the 2020s round of redistricting, as well as a subsequent mid-decade redistricting that resulted in a second majority-African American district being created before the 2024 elections, the district remains about equally divided on both sides of Lake Pontchartrain, with the northern portion extending from all of St. Tammany Parish to southern portions of Tangipahoa, Livingston and Ascension parishes (the latter two located in the Baton Rouge metropolitan area) including as far west as Sorrento, and the southern portion split between Scalise's political base in the East Bank suburbs west of New Orleans on one end and the southeastern corner of the state across most of St. Bernard, Plaquemines and Lafourche parishes. Despite this fact, the district in its latter-day iteration has yet to be represented by a resident from north of Lake Pontchartrain. The reformulation of the 1st congressional district so that it virtually surrounds "the nation's second-largest saltwater lake" has generated a local joke that the voters in the district are outnumbered by the fish.

== Parishes and communities ==
For the 119th and successive Congresses (based on the districts drawn following a 2023 court order), the district contains all or portions of the following parishes and communities.

Ascension Parish (1)

Sorrento

Jefferson Parish (11)

Barataria, Elmwood, Estelle (part; also 2nd), Grand Isle, Harahan, Jean Lafitte, Jefferson, Kenner (part; also 2nd), Lafitte, Metairie, River Ridge (part; also 2nd)

Lafourche Parish (9)

Bayou Blue (part; also 3rd; shared with Terrebonne Parish), Cut Off, Galliano, Golden Meadow, Larose, Lockport, Lockport Heights, Mathews, Raceland (part; also 3rd)

Livingston Parish (3)

Albany (part; also 6th), Killian, Springfield

Orleans Parish (1)

New Orleans (part; also 2nd)

Plaquemines Parish (9)

All nine communities

St. Bernard Parish (5)

Chalmette (part; also 2nd), Delacroix, Meraux (part; also 2nd), Poydras, Violet

St. Charles Parish (5)

Destrehan, Montz, New Sarpy, Norco, St. Rose (part; also 2nd)

St. Tammany Parish (11)

All eleven communities

Tangipahoa Parish (2)

Hammond (part; also 5th), Ponchatoula

== Recent election results from statewide races ==
Year	Office	Results
2008	President	McCain 73% - 25%
2012	President	Romney 73% - 27%
2014	Senate	Cassidy 66% - 34%
2015	Governor	Vitter 56% - 44%
2015	Lt. Governor	Nungesser 80% - 20%
2016	President	Trump 69% - 27%
2016	Senate	Kennedy 74% - 26%
2019	Governor	Rispone 55% - 45%
2019	Lt. Governor	Nungesser 80% - 20%
2019	Attorney General	Landry 76% - 24%
2020	President	Trump 69% - 30%
2023	Attorney General	Murrill 75% - 25%
2024	President	Trump 68% - 30%

== List of members representing the district ==
Member	Party	Years	Cong ress	Electoral history	District Location
District created March 4, 1823
Edward Livingston (New Orleans)	Democratic-Republican	March 4, 1823 – March 3, 1825	18th 19th 20th	Elected in 1822. Re-elected in 1824. Re-elected in 1826. Retired to run for U.S. Senator.	1823–1833; Ascension, Assumption, Saint Charles, Saint John, Lafourche, Orleans, Saint Bernard, Saint James, and Terrebonne parishes
Edward Livingston (New Orleans)	Jacksonian	March 4, 1825 – March 3, 1829	18th 19th 20th	Elected in 1822. Re-elected in 1824. Re-elected in 1826. Retired to run for U.S. Senator.	1823–1833; Ascension, Assumption, Saint Charles, Saint John, Lafourche, Orleans, Saint Bernard, Saint James, and Terrebonne parishes
Edward Douglass White Sr. (Donaldsonville)	Anti-Jacksonian	March 4, 1829 – March 3, 1833	21st 22nd 23rd	Elected in 1828. Re-elected in 1830. Re-elected in 1832. Retired to run for governor and resigned when elected.	1823–1833; Ascension, Assumption, Saint Charles, Saint John, Lafourche, Orleans, Saint Bernard, Saint James, and Terrebonne parishes
Edward Douglass White Sr. (Donaldsonville)	Anti-Jacksonian	March 4, 1833 – November 15, 1834	21st 22nd 23rd	Elected in 1828. Re-elected in 1830. Re-elected in 1832. Retired to run for governor and resigned when elected.	1833–1843 [data missing]
Vacant		November 15, 1834 – December 1, 1834	23rd		1833–1843 [data missing]
Henry Johnson (Donaldsonville)	Anti-Jacksonian	December 1, 1834 – March 3, 1837	23rd 24th 25th	Elected to finish White's term. Also elected to the next full term. Re-elected in 1836. Retired to run for Governor of Louisiana.	1833–1843 [data missing]
Henry Johnson (Donaldsonville)	Whig	March 4, 1837 – March 3, 1839	23rd 24th 25th	Elected to finish White's term. Also elected to the next full term. Re-elected in 1836. Retired to run for Governor of Louisiana.	1833–1843 [data missing]
Edward Douglass White Sr. (Thibodaux)	Whig	March 4, 1839 – March 3, 1843	26th 27th	Elected in 1838. Re-elected in 1840. Retired.	1833–1843 [data missing]
John Slidell (New Orleans)	Democratic	March 4, 1843 – November 10, 1845	28th 29th	Elected in 1842. Re-elected in 1844. Resigned.	1843–1853 [data missing]
Vacant		November 10, 1845 – January 29, 1846	29th		1843–1853 [data missing]
Emile La Sére (New Orleans)	Democratic	January 29, 1846 – March 3, 1851	29th 30th 31st	Elected to finish Slidell's term. Re-elected in 1846. Re-elected in 1848. Retired.	1843–1853 [data missing]
Louis St. Martin (New Orleans)	Democratic	March 4, 1851 – March 3, 1853	32nd	Elected in 1850. Retired.	1843–1853 [data missing]
William Dunbar (New Orleans)	Democratic	March 4, 1853 – March 3, 1855	33rd	Elected in 1852. Lost re-election.	1853–1863; Plaquemines and Saint Bernard parishes, as well as the portion of Orleans Parish on the right (west) bank of the Mississippi River and on the left (east) bank below Canal Street in the city of New Orleans
George Eustis Jr. (New Orleans)	Know Nothing	March 4, 1855 – March 3, 1859	34th 35th	Elected in 1854. Re-elected in 1856. Retired.	1853–1863; Plaquemines and Saint Bernard parishes, as well as the portion of Orleans Parish on the right (west) bank of the Mississippi River and on the left (east) bank below Canal Street in the city of New Orleans
J. E. Bouligny (New Orleans)	Know Nothing	December 3, 1859 – March 3, 1861	36th	Elected in 1859. Bouligny opposed Louisiana's secession and remained in Washington, D.C. during the Civil War. He never retook residency in Louisiana.	1853–1863; Plaquemines and Saint Bernard parishes, as well as the portion of Orleans Parish on the right (west) bank of the Mississippi River and on the left (east) bank below Canal Street in the city of New Orleans
Vacant		March 4, 1861 – February 17, 1863	37th	Civil War	1853–1863; Plaquemines and Saint Bernard parishes, as well as the portion of Orleans Parish on the right (west) bank of the Mississippi River and on the left (east) bank below Canal Street in the city of New Orleans
Benjamin Flanders (New Orleans)	Union	February 17, 1863 – March 3, 1863	37th	Elected in 1862. (Note: He was elected along with Michael Hahn on December 3, 1862, assuming the seat left vacant after J. E. Bouligny's term expired in 1861. Flanders and Hahn were not seated in Congress until the last fifteen days of their terms on February 17, 1863.); Retired.	1853–1863; Plaquemines and Saint Bernard parishes, as well as the portion of Orleans Parish on the right (west) bank of the Mississippi River and on the left (east) bank below Canal Street in the city of New Orleans
Vacant		March 3, 1863 – July 18, 1868	38th 39th 40th	Civil War–Louisiana under occupation	1863–1873 [data missing]
Jacob Hale Sypher (New Orleans)	Republican	July 18, 1868 – March 3, 1869	40th	Elected to finish the vacant term. Term expired during election contest.	1863–1873 [data missing]
Vacant		March 3, 1869 – November 7, 1870	41st	Contested election of Louis St. Martin and Jacob Hale Sypher, House decided neither candidate entitled to seat.	1863–1873 [data missing]
Jacob Hale Sypher (New Orleans)	Republican	November 7, 1870 – March 3, 1875	41st 42nd 43rd	Elected to finish the vacant term. (Note: There were so many irregularities in the 1868 election that Congress threw it out. Sypher won the second round.); Re-elected in 1870. Re-elected in 1872. Lost re-election. (Note: Sypher's 1872 re-election was successfully contested by Effingham Lawrence. Sypher lost, but only after the original returns were certified in his favor. After protracted court intervention, Lawrence was declared elected, but just one day (March 3, 1875) remained in the term, and in the meantime Lawrence had lost the 1874 election to Democrat Randall Lee Gibson.)	1863–1873 [data missing]
Jacob Hale Sypher (New Orleans)	Republican	November 7, 1870 – March 3, 1875	41st 42nd 43rd	Elected to finish the vacant term. Re-elected in 1870. Re-elected in 1872. Lost re-election.	1873–1883 [data missing]
Effingham Lawrence (New Orleans)	Democratic	March 3, 1875 – March 4, 1875	43rd	Successfully contested Sypher's election, then retired after one day in office—the shortest service ever by a member of the House of Representatives.	1873–1883 [data missing]
Randall Lee Gibson (New Orleans)	Democratic	March 4, 1875 – March 3, 1883	44th 45th 46th 47th	Elected in 1874. Re-elected in 1876. Re-elected in 1878. Re-elected in 1880. Retired to run for U.S. senator.	1873–1883 [data missing]
Carleton Hunt (New Orleans)	Democratic	March 4, 1883 – March 3, 1885	48th	Elected in 1882. Retired.	1883–1893 [data missing]
Louis St. Martin (New Orleans)	Democratic	March 4, 1885 – March 3, 1887	49th	Elected in 1884. Retired.	1883–1893 [data missing]
Theodore Stark Wilkinson (Plaquemines Parish)	Democratic	March 4, 1887 – March 3, 1891	50th 51st	Elected in 1886. Re-elected in 1888. Retired.	1883–1893 [data missing]
Adolph Meyer (New Orleans)	Democratic	March 4, 1891 – March 8, 1908	52nd 53rd 54th 55th 56th 57th 58th 59th 60th	Elected in 1890. Re-elected in 1892. Re-elected in 1894. Re-elected in 1896. Re-elected in 1898. Re-elected in 1900. Re-elected in 1902. Re-elected in 1904. Re-elected in 1906. Died.	1883–1893 [data missing]
Adolph Meyer (New Orleans)	Democratic	March 4, 1891 – March 8, 1908	52nd 53rd 54th 55th 56th 57th 58th 59th 60th	Elected in 1890. Re-elected in 1892. Re-elected in 1894. Re-elected in 1896. Re-elected in 1898. Re-elected in 1900. Re-elected in 1902. Re-elected in 1904. Re-elected in 1906. Died.	1893–1903 [data missing]
Adolph Meyer (New Orleans)	Democratic	March 4, 1891 – March 8, 1908	52nd 53rd 54th 55th 56th 57th 58th 59th 60th	Elected in 1890. Re-elected in 1892. Re-elected in 1894. Re-elected in 1896. Re-elected in 1898. Re-elected in 1900. Re-elected in 1902. Re-elected in 1904. Re-elected in 1906. Died.	1903–1913 [data missing]
Vacant		March 8, 1908 – November 3, 1908	60th		1903–1913 [data missing]
Albert Estopinal (Estopinal)	Democratic	November 3, 1908 – April 28, 1919	60th 61st 62nd 63rd 64th 65th 66th	Elected to finish Meyer's term. Also elected to the next full term. Re-elected in 1910. Re-elected in 1912. Re-elected in 1914. Re-elected in 1916. Re-elected in 1918. Died.	1903–1913 [data missing]
Albert Estopinal (Estopinal)	Democratic	November 3, 1908 – April 28, 1919	60th 61st 62nd 63rd 64th 65th 66th	Elected to finish Meyer's term. Also elected to the next full term. Re-elected in 1910. Re-elected in 1912. Re-elected in 1914. Re-elected in 1916. Re-elected in 1918. Died.	1913–1923 [data missing]
Vacant		April 28, 1919 – June 5, 1919	66th		1913–1923 [data missing]
James O'Connor (New Orleans)	Democratic	June 5, 1919 – March 3, 1931	66th 67th 68th 69th 70th 71st	Elected to finish Estopinal's term. Re-elected in 1920. Re-elected in 1922. Re-elected in 1924. Re-elected in 1926. Re-elected in 1928. Lost renomination.	1913–1923 [data missing]
James O'Connor (New Orleans)	Democratic	June 5, 1919 – March 3, 1931	66th 67th 68th 69th 70th 71st	Elected to finish Estopinal's term. Re-elected in 1920. Re-elected in 1922. Re-elected in 1924. Re-elected in 1926. Re-elected in 1928. Lost renomination.	1923–1933 [data missing]
Joachim O. Fernandez (New Orleans)	Democratic	March 4, 1931 – January 3, 1941	72nd 73rd 74th 75th 76th	Elected in 1930. Re-elected in 1932. Re-elected in 1934. Re-elected in 1936. Re-elected in 1938. Lost renomination.	1923–1933 [data missing]
Joachim O. Fernandez (New Orleans)	Democratic	March 4, 1931 – January 3, 1941	72nd 73rd 74th 75th 76th	Elected in 1930. Re-elected in 1932. Re-elected in 1934. Re-elected in 1936. Re-elected in 1938. Lost renomination.	1933–1943 [data missing]
Felix Edward Hébert (New Orleans)	Democratic	January 3, 1941 – January 3, 1977	77th 78th 79th 80th 81st 82nd 83rd 84th 85th 86th 87th 88th 89th 90th 91st 92nd 93rd 94th	Elected in 1940. Re-elected in 1942. Re-elected in 1944. Re-elected in 1946. Re-elected in 1948. Re-elected in 1950. Re-elected in 1952. Re-elected in 1954. Re-elected in 1956. Re-elected in 1958. Re-elected in 1960. Re-elected in 1964. Re-elected in 1966. Re-elected in 1968. Re-elected in 1970. Re-elected in 1972. Re-elected in 1974. Retired.	1933–1943 [data missing]
Felix Edward Hébert (New Orleans)	Democratic	January 3, 1941 – January 3, 1977	77th 78th 79th 80th 81st 82nd 83rd 84th 85th 86th 87th 88th 89th 90th 91st 92nd 93rd 94th	Elected in 1940. Re-elected in 1942. Re-elected in 1944. Re-elected in 1946. Re-elected in 1948. Re-elected in 1950. Re-elected in 1952. Re-elected in 1954. Re-elected in 1956. Re-elected in 1958. Re-elected in 1960. Re-elected in 1964. Re-elected in 1966. Re-elected in 1968. Re-elected in 1970. Re-elected in 1972. Re-elected in 1974. Retired.	1943–1953 [data missing]
Felix Edward Hébert (New Orleans)	Democratic	January 3, 1941 – January 3, 1977	77th 78th 79th 80th 81st 82nd 83rd 84th 85th 86th 87th 88th 89th 90th 91st 92nd 93rd 94th	Elected in 1940. Re-elected in 1942. Re-elected in 1944. Re-elected in 1946. Re-elected in 1948. Re-elected in 1950. Re-elected in 1952. Re-elected in 1954. Re-elected in 1956. Re-elected in 1958. Re-elected in 1960. Re-elected in 1964. Re-elected in 1966. Re-elected in 1968. Re-elected in 1970. Re-elected in 1972. Re-elected in 1974. Retired.	1953–1963 [data missing]
Felix Edward Hébert (New Orleans)	Democratic	January 3, 1941 – January 3, 1977	77th 78th 79th 80th 81st 82nd 83rd 84th 85th 86th 87th 88th 89th 90th 91st 92nd 93rd 94th	Elected in 1940. Re-elected in 1942. Re-elected in 1944. Re-elected in 1946. Re-elected in 1948. Re-elected in 1950. Re-elected in 1952. Re-elected in 1954. Re-elected in 1956. Re-elected in 1958. Re-elected in 1960. Re-elected in 1964. Re-elected in 1966. Re-elected in 1968. Re-elected in 1970. Re-elected in 1972. Re-elected in 1974. Retired.	1963–1973 [data missing]
Felix Edward Hébert (New Orleans)	Democratic	January 3, 1941 – January 3, 1977	77th 78th 79th 80th 81st 82nd 83rd 84th 85th 86th 87th 88th 89th 90th 91st 92nd 93rd 94th	Elected in 1940. Re-elected in 1942. Re-elected in 1944. Re-elected in 1946. Re-elected in 1948. Re-elected in 1950. Re-elected in 1952. Re-elected in 1954. Re-elected in 1956. Re-elected in 1958. Re-elected in 1960. Re-elected in 1964. Re-elected in 1966. Re-elected in 1968. Re-elected in 1970. Re-elected in 1972. Re-elected in 1974. Retired.	1973–1983 [data missing]
Richard A. Tonry (Arabi)	Democratic	January 3, 1977 – May 4, 1977	95th	Elected in 1976. Resigned after conviction for vote-buying.	1973–1983 [data missing]
Vacant		May 4, 1977 – August 27, 1977	95th		1973–1983 [data missing]
Bob Livingston (New Orleans 1977–83; Metairie 1984–99)	Republican	August 27, 1977 – March 1, 1999	95th 96th 97th 98th 99th 100th 101st 102nd 103rd 104th 105th 106th	Elected to finish Tonry's term. Re-elected in 1978. Re-elected in 1980. Re-elected in 1982. Re-elected in 1984. Re-elected in 1986. Re-elected in 1988. Re-elected in 1990. Re-elected in 1992. Re-elected in 1994. Re-elected in 1996. Re-elected in 1998. Resigned following revelations of his extramarital affair.	1973–1983 [data missing]
Bob Livingston (New Orleans 1977–83; Metairie 1984–99)	Republican	August 27, 1977 – March 1, 1999	95th 96th 97th 98th 99th 100th 101st 102nd 103rd 104th 105th 106th	Elected to finish Tonry's term. Re-elected in 1978. Re-elected in 1980. Re-elected in 1982. Re-elected in 1984. Re-elected in 1986. Re-elected in 1988. Re-elected in 1990. Re-elected in 1992. Re-elected in 1994. Re-elected in 1996. Re-elected in 1998. Resigned following revelations of his extramarital affair.	1983–1993 [data missing]
Bob Livingston (New Orleans 1977–83; Metairie 1984–99)	Republican	August 27, 1977 – March 1, 1999	95th 96th 97th 98th 99th 100th 101st 102nd 103rd 104th 105th 106th	Elected to finish Tonry's term. Re-elected in 1978. Re-elected in 1980. Re-elected in 1982. Re-elected in 1984. Re-elected in 1986. Re-elected in 1988. Re-elected in 1990. Re-elected in 1992. Re-elected in 1994. Re-elected in 1996. Re-elected in 1998. Resigned following revelations of his extramarital affair.	1993–2003 [data missing]
Vacant		March 2, 1999 – May 29, 1999	106th		1993–2003 [data missing]
David Vitter (Metairie)	Republican	May 29, 1999 – January 3, 2005	106th 107th 108th	Elected to finish Livingston's term. Re-elected in 2000. Re-elected in 2002. Retired to run for U.S. senator.	1993–2003 [data missing]
David Vitter (Metairie)	Republican	May 29, 1999 – January 3, 2005	106th 107th 108th	Elected to finish Livingston's term. Re-elected in 2000. Re-elected in 2002. Retired to run for U.S. senator.	2003–2013
Bobby Jindal (Kenner)	Republican	January 3, 2005 – January 14, 2008	109th 110th	Elected in 2004. Re-elected in 2006. Resigned to become Governor of Louisiana.	2003–2013
Vacant		January 14, 2008 – May 7, 2008	110th		2003–2013
Steve Scalise (Jefferson)	Republican	May 7, 2008 – present	110th 111th 112th 113th 114th 115th 116th 117th 118th 119th	Elected to finish Jindal's term. Re-elected later in 2008. Re-elected in 2010. Re-elected in 2012. Re-elected in 2014. Re-elected in 2016. Re-elected in 2018. Re-elected in 2020. Re-elected in 2022. Re-elected in 2024. Re-elected in 2026.	2003–2013
Steve Scalise (Jefferson)	Republican	May 7, 2008 – present	110th 111th 112th 113th 114th 115th 116th 117th 118th 119th	Elected to finish Jindal's term. Re-elected later in 2008. Re-elected in 2010. Re-elected in 2012. Re-elected in 2014. Re-elected in 2016. Re-elected in 2018. Re-elected in 2020. Re-elected in 2022. Re-elected in 2024. Re-elected in 2026.	2013–2023
Steve Scalise (Jefferson)	Republican	May 7, 2008 – present	110th 111th 112th 113th 114th 115th 116th 117th 118th 119th	Elected to finish Jindal's term. Re-elected later in 2008. Re-elected in 2010. Re-elected in 2012. Re-elected in 2014. Re-elected in 2016. Re-elected in 2018. Re-elected in 2020. Re-elected in 2022. Re-elected in 2024. Re-elected in 2026.	2023–2025
Steve Scalise (Jefferson)	Republican	May 7, 2008 – present	110th 111th 112th 113th 114th 115th 116th 117th 118th 119th	Elected to finish Jindal's term. Re-elected later in 2008. Re-elected in 2010. Re-elected in 2012. Re-elected in 2014. Re-elected in 2016. Re-elected in 2018. Re-elected in 2020. Re-elected in 2022. Re-elected in 2024. Re-elected in 2026.	2025–present

== Recent election results ==
=== 2002 ===
Louisiana's 1st Congressional District Election (2002)
Party	Candidate	Votes	%
Republican	David Vitter (Incumbent)	147,117	81.47
Republican	Monica L. Monica	20,268	11.22
Republican	Robert Namer	7,229	4.00
Libertarian	Ian P. Hawxhurst	5,956	3.30
Total votes		180,570	100.00
Republican hold			

=== 2004 ===
Louisiana's 1st Congressional District Election (2004)
Party	Candidate	Votes	%
Republican	Bobby Jindal	225,708	78.40
Democratic	Roy Armstrong	19,266	6.69
Democratic	Vinny Mendoza	12,779	4.44
Democratic	Daniel Zimmerman	12,135	4.22
Democratic	Jerry Watts	10,034	3.49
Republican	Mike Rogers	7,975	2.77
Total votes		287,897	100.00
Republican hold			

=== 2006 ===
Louisiana's 1st Congressional District Election (2006)
Party	Candidate	Votes	%
Republican	Bobby Jindal (Incumbent)	130,508	88.11
Democratic	David Gereighty	10,919	7.37
Democratic	Stacey Tallitsch	5,025	3.39
Libertarian	Peter L. Beary	1,676	1.13
Total votes		148,128	100.00
Republican hold			

=== 2008 ===
Louisiana's 1st Congressional District Special Election (May 3, 2008)
Party	Candidate	Votes	%
Republican	Steve Scalise	33,867	75.14
Democratic	Gilda Reed	10,142	22.50
Independent	R.A. "Skip" Galan	786	1.74
Independent	Anthony Gentile	280	0.62
Total votes		45,075	100.00
Republican hold			

Louisiana's 1st Congressional District General Election (2008)
Party	Candidate	Votes	%
Republican	Steve Scalise (Incumbent)	189,168	65.68
Democratic	Jim Harlan	98,839	34.32
Total votes		288,007	100.00
Republican hold			

=== 2010 ===
Louisiana's 1st Congressional District Election (2010)
Party	Candidate	Votes	%
Republican	Steve Scalise (Incumbent)	157,182	78.52
Democratic	Myron Katz	38,416	19.19
Independent	Arden Wells	4,578	2.29
Total votes		200,176	100.00
Republican hold			

=== 2012 ===
Louisiana's 1st Congressional District Election (2012)
Party	Candidate	Votes	%
Republican	Steve Scalise (Incumbent)	193,496	66.63
Democratic	Vinny Mendoza	61,703	21.25
Republican	Gary King	24,844	8.55
Independent	David Turknett	6,079	2.09
Independent	Arden Wells	4,578	1.48
Total votes		290,410	100.00
Republican hold			

=== 2014 ===
Louisiana's 1st Congressional District Election (2014)
Party	Candidate	Votes	%
Republican	Steve Scalise (Incumbent)	189,250	77.56
Democratic	Vinny Mendoza	24,761	10.15
Democratic	Lee Dugas	21,286	8.72
Libertarian	Jeff Sanford	8,707	3.57
Total votes		244,004	100.00
Republican hold			

=== 2016 ===
Louisiana's 1st Congressional District Election (2016)
Party	Candidate	Votes	%
Republican	Steve Scalise (Incumbent)	243,645	74.56
Democratic	Lee Ann Dugas	41,840	12.80
Democratic	Danil Faust	12,708	3.89
Libertarian	Howard Kearney	9,405	2.88
Democratic	Joe Swider	9,237	2.83
Green	Eliot Barron	6,717	2.06
Independent	Chuemal Yang	3,236	0.99
Total votes		326,788	100.00
Republican hold			

=== 2018 ===
Louisiana's 1st congressional district, 2018
Party	Candidate	Votes	%
Republican	Steve Scalise (Incumbent)	192,526	71.5
Democratic	Tammy Savoie	44,262	16.4
Democratic	Lee Ann Dugas	18,552	6.9
Democratic	Jim Francis	8,685	3.2
Libertarian	Howard Kearney	2,806	1.0
Independent	Frederick "Ferd" Jones	2,442	0.9
Total votes		269,325	100.0
Republican hold			

=== 2020 ===
Louisiana's 1st congressional district, 2020
Party	Candidate	Votes	%
Republican	Steve Scalise (incumbent)	270,330	72.21
Democratic	Lee Ann Dugas	94,730	25.30
Libertarian	Howard Kearney	9,309	2.49
Total votes		374,369	100.0
Republican hold			

=== 2022 ===
Louisiana's 1st congressional district, 2022
Party	Candidate	Votes	%
Republican	Steve Scalise (incumbent)	177,670	72.8
Democratic	Katie Darling	61,467	25.2
Libertarian	Howard Kearney	4,907	2.0
Total votes		244,044	100.0
Republican hold			

=== 2024 ===
Louisiana's 1st congressional district, 2024
Party	Candidate	Votes	%
Republican	Steve Scalise (incumbent)	238,842	66.8
Democratic	Mel Manuel	85,911	24.0
Republican	Randall Arrington	17,856	5.0
Republican	Ross Shales	8,330	2.3
Independent	Frankie Hyers	6,781	1.9
Total votes		357,720	100.0
Republican hold			

== See also ==
- Louisiana's congressional districts
- List of United States congressional districts
