= Abner Nash Ogden =

American judge (1809–1875)

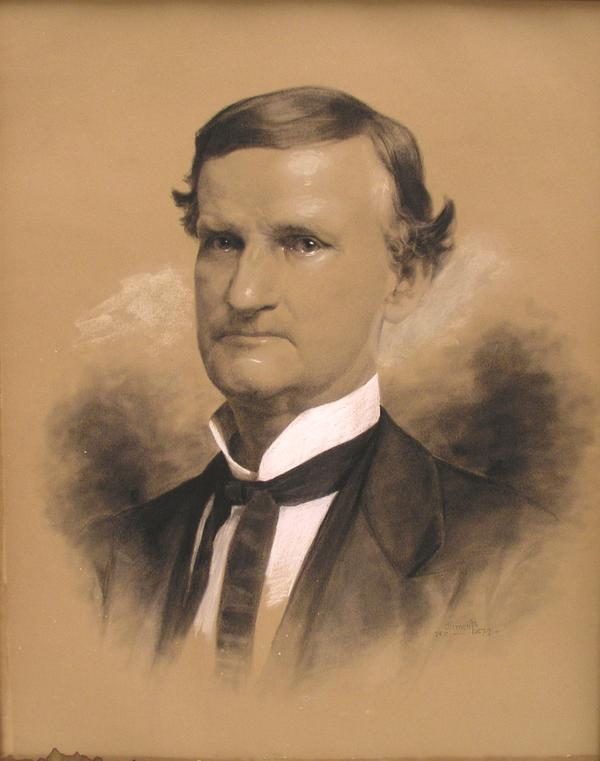

Associate Justice of the Louisiana Supreme Court
- In office May 4, 1853 – July 1855
- Preceded by: William Dunbar
- Succeeded by: James Neilson Lea

Personal details
- Born: September 19, 1809 Hillsborough, North Carolina, U.S.
- Died: August 11, 1875 (aged 65) Blount Springs, Alabama, U.S.

Abner Nash Ogden (September 19, 1809 – August 11, 1875) was a justice of the Louisiana Supreme Court from May 4, 1853, to July 1855.

Born in Hillsborough, North Carolina, Ogden's father was judge Robert Ogden and his maternal grandfather was North Carolina Governor Abner Nash. Following an amendment to the Louisiana Constitution allowing direct election of justices, Ogden was elected to serve as an associate justice of the Louisiana Supreme Court for a term beginning May 4, 1853, remaining in office until July 1855, and thereafter serving as the Court Reporter for that body until 1865.

Ogden declined a seat on the federal bench at one time, on the United States District Court for the District of Louisiana.

Ogden died in Blount Springs, Alabama.

Political offices
Preceded by William Dunbar	Justice of the Louisiana Supreme Court; 1853–1855	Succeeded by James Neilson Lea
