= Louisiana's congressional districts =

Map of Louisiana's congressional districts since 2025 Interactive map version

District lines to be used from the 2026 elections, per SB 121 signed by the Governor of Louisiana on May 29, 2026 Interactive map version

The U.S. state of Louisiana currently has six congressional districts. The state has had as many as eight districts; the eighth district was eliminated on January 9, 1993 after results of the 1990 census, and the seventh district was eliminated in 2013, following results of the 2010 census, largely because of people moving interstate after Hurricane Katrina hit the state.

== Current districts and representatives ==
This is a list of United States representatives from Louisiana, their terms, their district boundaries, and the district political ratings according to the CPVI. The delegation currently has a total of six members: four of the current representatives are Republicans, and two are Democrats.

In 2023, the Fifth Circuit Court of Appeals found in the case Robinson v. Ardoin that the drawing of Louisiana’s congressional districts was an illegal racial gerrymander by the Republican-controlled legislature, drawn to dilute the influence of African-Americans and lock in White majorities in five out of six districts, despite the former making up a third of Louisiana's population. The court ordered the maps be redrawn with a second district with an African-American majority to reflect the state's demographics and allow them to elect a representative of their choice.

The case was caught up in appeals for several months; however, the Louisiana State Assembly eventually passed updated congressional maps to adhere to the court’s ruling, resulting in a second district with an African-American majority, and widely expected to increase Democratic representation in the state from one to two congressmen (due to racial polarization in the state), at the expense of the 6th district's incumbent Garret Graves. An attempt to disqualify the new map by a fresh lawsuit was put on hold by the Supreme Court, letting the map be used for the 2024 elections.

One April 29, 2026, the Supreme Court ruled in Louisiana vs. Callais et al. that the 2024 map with a second majority-Black district was an impermissible racial gerrymander. On May 29, 2026, Louisiana enacted a new map that eliminated the second Black-majority district.

Current U.S. representatives from Louisiana
District	Member (Residence)	Party	Incumbent since	CPVI (2025)	District map
1st	Steve Scalise (Jefferson)	Republican	May 3, 2008	R+19	
2nd	Troy Carter (New Orleans)	Democratic	May 11, 2021	D+17	
3rd	Clay Higgins (Lafayette)	Republican	January 3, 2017	R+22	
4th	Mike Johnson (Benton)	Republican	January 3, 2017	R+26	
5th	Julia Letlow (Start)	Republican	April 14, 2021	R+18	
6th	Cleo Fields (Baton Rouge)	Democratic	January 3, 2025	D+8	

== Historical and present district boundaries ==
Table of United States congressional district boundary maps in the State of Louisiana, presented chronologically.

Year	Statewide map	New Orleans highlight
1973–1982		
1983–1984		
1985–1992		
1993–1994		
1995–1996		
1997–2002		
2003–2012		
2013–2023		
2023–2025		

== Obsolete districts ==
- Orleans Territory's at-large congressional district, obsolete since statehood
- Louisiana's at-large congressional district (1812–1823; 1873–1875)
- Louisiana's 7th congressional district, obsolete since the 2010 census
- Louisiana's 8th congressional district, obsolete since the 1990 census

=== History ===
See District of Louisiana, Louisiana Territory, Territory of Orleans.

Louisiana was purchased from France in 1803, and the territory was organized into the District of Louisiana and the Territory of Orleans in 1804. Areas that are within the current boundaries of Louisiana, but were outside the Territory of Orleans, were ceded by the Spanish in the Adams-Onís Treaty of 1819. From 1806 until 1811, the Territory of Orleans sent one non-voting delegate to the U.S. House of Representatives. Upon Louisiana's admission to the United States in 1812, and until 1823, Louisiana had only one at-large representative. In 1823, three districts were granted to Louisiana. By 1875, Louisiana had six districts.

== See also ==
- List of United States congressional districts
