= Albert Estopinal =

American politician (1845–1919)

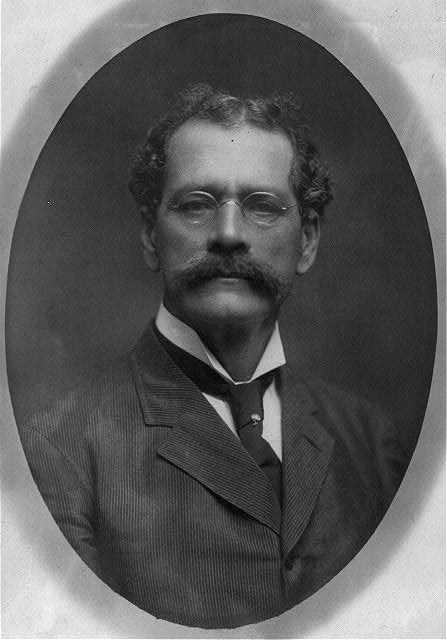

Member of the U.S. House of Representatives from Louisiana's 1st district
- In office November 3, 1908 – April 28, 1919
- Preceded by: Adolph Meyer
- Succeeded by: James O'Connor

Personal details
- Born: January 30, 1845 St. Bernard Parrish, Louisiana
- Died: April 28, 1919 (aged 74) New Orleans, Louisiana
- Resting place: St. Louis Cemetery No. 3, New Orleans, Louisiana, U.S.
- Party: Democratic

Albert Estopinal (January 30, 1845 – April 28, 1919) was an American Civil War veteran who served seven terms as a U.S. representative from Louisiana from 1908 to 1919.

== Biography ==
Albert Estopinal was born in St. Bernard Parish, Louisiana, on January 30, 1845. He attended both public and private schools before leaving school in January 1862 to enlist in the Confederate Army.

=== Civil War ===
During the Civil War, Estopinal served in Company G, Twenty-eighth Regiment of the Louisiana Infantry. He eventually rose to the rank of sergeant of Company G, Twenty-second Louisiana Heavy Artillery. There, he served throughout the Civil War.

== Political career ==
After the war, he engaged in the commission business at New Orleans for several years, although most of his life was spent at his home, "Kenilworth Plantation," near New Orleans.

He served as sheriff of St. Bernard Parish from 1872 to 1876, and was a member of the Louisiana House of Representatives from 1876 to 1880. He was member of the state constitutional conventions in both 1879 and 1898. He then served in the Louisiana State Senate from 1880 to 1900, then was elected Lieutenant Governor, serving from 1900 to 1904.

He was chairman of the Democratic State central committee in 1908, before being elected as a Democrat to the Sixtieth Congress to fill the vacancy caused by the death of Adolph Meyer. He was subsequently reelected to the Sixty-first and to the five succeeding Congresses, serving from November 3, 1908, until his death.

== Death ==
Estopinal died in New Orleans on April 28, 1919. His interment was in St. Louis Cemetery No. 3, in New Orleans.

== See also ==
- List of minority governors and lieutenant governors in the United States

Political offices
Preceded by Robert H. Snyder	Lieutenant Governor of Louisiana; 1900–1904	Succeeded by Jared Y. Sanders, Sr.
U.S. House of Representatives
Preceded by Adolph Meyer	Member of the U.S. House of Representatives from Louisiana's 1st congressional district 1908–1919	Succeeded by James O'Connor
