= Louis St. Martin =

American politician (1820–1893)

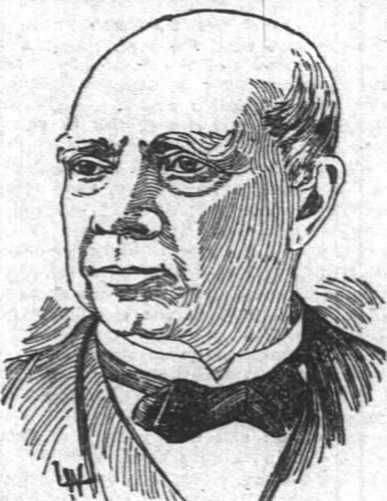
- From the February 10, 1893 edition of The Daily Picayune (New Orleans, Louisiana)

Member of the U.S. House of Representatives from Louisiana's 1st district
- In office March 4, 1885 – March 3, 1887
- Preceded by: Carleton Hunt
- Succeeded by: Theodore Stark Wilkinson
- In office March 4, 1851 – March 3, 1853
- Preceded by: Emile La Sére
- Succeeded by: William Dunbar

Personal details
- Born: May 17, 1820 St. Charles Parish, Louisiana
- Died: February 9, 1893 (aged 72) New Orleans, Louisiana
- Party: Democratic

Louis St. Martin (May 17, 1820 – February 9, 1893) was an American politician from Louisiana.

He first was elected to the Louisiana state house of representatives in 1840. However, he then held a federal appointment for much of the mid-1840s. He was a member of the Louisiana House of Representatives 1846–1850. In 1850 he was elected a member of the U. S. House of Representatives representing the state of Louisiana in its First District, which at the time encompassed part of New Orleans and everything east of the city but south of Lake Pontchartrain. At this point he only served one term in Congress. He was a Democrat.

In 1852 he did not run for reelection and then went into business ventures. About this time he served as an election commissioner for the city of New Orleans.

He was elected to Congress in 1864, but Congress refused to accept the reconstruction of Louisiana as it stood then and refused to seat any members of Congress from the state. St. Martin was again elected to the Forty-first Congress, but the house ruled the election invalid, and St. Martin was not returned by the latter election to that congress that allowed for Universal Male Suffrage in the state. In 1884, when the vote had again been essentially restricted to only white males in Louisiana, St. Martin was returned to the house, representing the First District which had virtually the same boundaries it had had when he was first sent to congress more than 30 years before. He was a delegate to the Democratic National Convention in 1852, 1868, 1876 and 1880.

St. Martin was born in St. Charles Parish and died in New Orleans.

The long hiatus between St. Martin's two terms in the U.S. House of Representatives can be partially explained by the intervening Civil War.

U.S. House of Representatives
Preceded by Emile La Sére	Member of the U.S. House of Representatives from Louisiana's 1st congressional district 1851-1853	Succeeded by William Dunbar
Preceded by Carleton Hunt	Member of the U.S. House of Representatives from Louisiana's 1st congressional district 1885-1887	Succeeded by Theodore Stark Wilkinson
