= William Dunbar (politician) =

American judge

Member of the United States House of Representatives from Louisiana's 1st district
- In office March 4, 1853 – March 3, 1855
- Preceded by: Louis St. Martin
- Succeeded by: George Eustis Jr.

Justice of the Louisiana Supreme Court
- In office September 1, 1852 – May 4, 1853
- Preceded by: Isaac Trimble Preston
- Succeeded by: Abner Nash Ogden

Personal details
- Born: 1805 Virginia
- Died: March 18, 1861 (aged 55–56) St. Bernard Parish, Louisiana
- Party: Democratic

William Dunbar (1805 – March 18, 1861) was a U.S. representative from Louisiana.

He was born in Virginia in 1805 and completed preparatory studies before moving to Alexandria, Virginia, where he engaged in the practice of law in the early 1830s. Dunbar moved to Louisiana in 1852 and was appointed Associate Justice of the Supreme Court of Louisiana to fill the vacancy caused by the death of Judge Preston and served from September 1, 1852, to May 4, 1853. He was elected as a Democrat to the Thirty-third Congress (March 4, 1853 – March 3, 1855) representing Louisiana's 1st congressional district. Defeated by a "Know-Nothing" candidate after one term, Rep. Dunbar retired to his sugar plantation in St. Bernard Parish and resided there until his death on March 18, 1861.

Political offices
| Preceded by Isaac Trimble Preston | Justice of the Louisiana Supreme Court; 1852–1853 | Succeeded by Abner Nash Ogden |
U.S. House of Representatives
| Preceded by Louis St. Martin | Member of the U.S. House of Representatives from Louisiana's 1st congressional district 1853 – 1855 | Succeeded by George Eustis Jr. |
