= Dominique Bouligny =

Spanish-American politician (1773–1833)

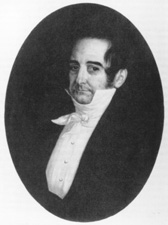

United States Senator from Louisiana
- In office November 19, 1824 – March 4, 1829 Serving with Josiah S. Johnston
- Preceded by: Henry Johnson
- Succeeded by: Edward Livingston

Personal details
- Born: Charles Dominique Joseph Bouligny; August 22, 1773 New Orleans, Louisiana, New Spain
- Died: March 4, 1833 (aged 59) New Orleans, Louisiana, U.S.
- Party: Democratic-Republican (Before 1828); National Republican (1828–1833)
- Spouse: Anna Arthémise Le Blanc (m. 1803)

Charles Dominique Joseph Bouligny (August 22, 1773 – March 4, 1833) was a lawyer and politician who was elected as U.S. Senator from Louisiana, serving from 1824 to 1829. He had earlier served in the territorial House of Representatives. Of French and Spanish descent, he was brother to Louis Bouligny, a state representative, and uncle of John Edward Bouligny, who was elected as U.S. Representative from New Orleans.

== Life and career ==
Bouligny, known as Dominique or its Spanish form Domingo, was born in New Orleans, Louisiana (New Spain), on August 22, 1773. His father, Francisco Bouligny, came to Louisiana as a military official when the territory was transferred from France to Spain and became a high-ranking official in Spanish Louisiana. His mother was Marie-Louise Le Sénéchal d'Auberville, who belonged to a prominent of New Orleans Creole family. He was the couple's second child and eldest son.

In 1786, when he was 12, Bouligny joined Spain's Louisiana Regiment as a cadet earning a commission as sublieutenant two years later. When the War of the First Coalition broke out in Europe, Bouligny was assigned to the Louisiana Regiment's artillery corps, he later was put in command of a squadron of gunboats sent up the Mississippi to the District of Illinois, and oversaw the initial construction of Fort San Fernando De Las Barrancas. In December 1795, he was promoted to lieutenant. He resigned from the regiment in 1803 when it departed the territory following Louisiana's return to French rule.

In 1800, he purchased a regidor perpétuo seat in the cabildo, the New Orleans municipal governmental council, from Gilberto Andry for 800 silver pesos. A year later, he was elected by the council as one of two "annual commissioners," who represented the Cabildo before the governor and oversaw audits of the city treasurer. After the Sale of Louisiana in 1803, Bouligny (and other colonial residents) assumed U.S. citizenship. Having resigned his Spanish military commission, Bouligny turned his attention to his large sugarcane plantation upriver from New Orleans where he also produced tafia rum. He was a slaveholder.

In 1805, Bouligny was elected to the House of Representatives for the Territory of Orleans as one of seven representatives from Orleans County. He was reelected to the house in 1807. During his second term, he served on the committee that drafted the civil code of 1808. That same year, he was appointed as a major in the territorial militia's Fourth Regiment. In 1813, after Louisiana was admitted to the Union as a state, Bouligny became a member of the Orleans Parish police jury, which oversaw administration of the parish.

During the War of 1812, Bouligny was appointed to the Committee for the Defense of New Orleans, successfully rallying volunteers to protect the city during the British invasion of 1814–1815.

In 1824, the Louisiana state legislature elected Bouligny to the U.S. Senate to complete the term of Henry Johnson who had been elected governor. Bouligny served in the Senate from November 19, 1824, to March 4, 1829, and aligned himself with Henry Clay and the National Republican Party. He served as chair of the Senate Agriculture Committee in the second session of the 20th Congress where he supported several tariff bills, including the Tariff of Abominations, which he felt benefited Louisiana's sugarcane industry.

Rising Jacksonian sentiment doomed Bouligny's chances for reelection in 1829, and the Louisiana legislature elected Edward Livingston senator on the fifth round of balloting. Bouligny returned to Louisiana and, after contemplating running for mayor of New Orleans against incumbent Denis Prieur, he began divesting from his plantation in favor of property within the City of New Orleans.

== Personal life ==
In early 1803, before Louisiana was returned to France, Bouligny married Anna Arthémise Le Blanc (1785 – 1848), the daughter of a prominent allied family. The couple had 15 children, 12 of whom — six sons and six daughters — lived to adulthood.

Dominique Bouligny died in New Orleans on March 4, 1833. His remains were interred in Saint Louis Cemetery No. 1.

== See also ==
- List of Hispanic and Latino Americans in the United States Congress

U.S. Senate
Preceded by Henry Johnson	U.S. Senator (Class 2) from Louisiana; 1824–1829; Served alongside: Josiah S. Johnston	Succeeded by Edward Livingston
