= Carleton Hunt =

American politician

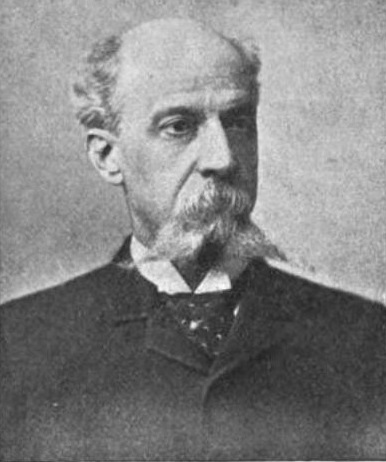
- From the March 1890 edition of The Green Bag magazine

Member of the U.S. House of Representatives from Louisiana's 1st district
- In office March 4, 1883 – March 3, 1885
- Preceded by: Randall L. Gibson
- Succeeded by: Louis St. Martin

Personal details
- Born: January 1, 1836 New Orleans, Louisiana
- Died: August 14, 1921 (aged 85) New Orleans, Louisiana
- Party: Democratic
- Other political affiliations: Constitutional Union Party

Carleton Hunt (January 1, 1836 – August 14, 1921) was a member of the U.S. House of Representatives representing the state of Louisiana. He served one term as a Democrat.

Hunt was born in New Orleans and attended Harvard and law school at Tulane. Prior to the Civil War he had been affiliated with the Constitutional Union Party. He was a professor and ten-year dean of the law school at Tulane. He served as a lieutenant in the Confederate artillery during the Civil War.

Carleton Hunt was the son of prominent New Orleans physician Thomas Hunt (1808–1867), who was one of the founders of Tulane University's medical school, and the former Aglae Marie Carleton (1816–1847). He married Georgine Cammack; the couple had three sons, who became a doctor and two lawyers. Hunt died in New Orleans. He was a member of The Boston Club of New Orleans.

U.S. House of Representatives
| Preceded by Randall Lee Gibson | Member of the U.S. House of Representatives from Louisiana's 1st congressional district 1883 – 1885 | Succeeded by Louis St. Martin |
