= Josiah S. Johnston =

American politician (1784–1833)

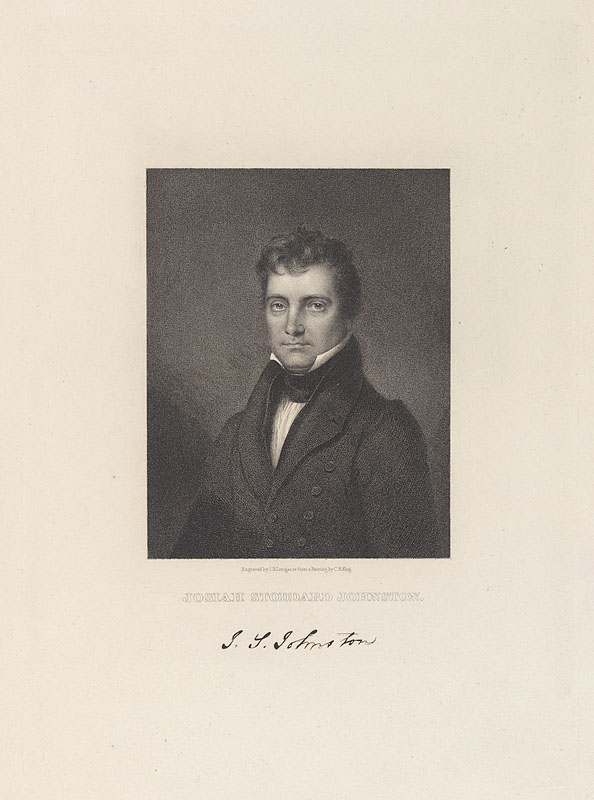

United States Senator from Louisiana
- In office January 15, 1824 – May 19, 1833
- Preceded by: James Brown
- Succeeded by: Alexander Porter

Member of the U.S. House of Representatives from Louisiana's at-large district
- In office March 4, 1821 – March 3, 1823
- Preceded by: Thomas Butler
- Succeeded by: District inactive

Personal details
- Born: November 24, 1784 Salisbury, Connecticut, U.S.
- Died: May 19, 1833 (aged 48) Red River, Louisiana, U.S.
- Party: Democratic-Republican
- Spouse: Eliza Sibley

Josiah Stoddard Johnston (November 24, 1784 – May 19, 1833) was an American politician who served as both United States representative and senator for Louisiana. Born in Salisbury, Connecticut, he moved with his father to Kentucky in 1788, and went to Connecticut to attend primary school. He graduated from Transylvania University (Lexington, Kentucky) in 1802, studied law, was admitted to the bar, and commenced practice in Alexandria, Louisiana (then the Territory of Orleans). He was a member of the Territorial legislature from 1805 to 1812 and during the War of 1812 raised and organized a regiment for the defense of New Orleans, but reached the city after the battle. He engaged in agricultural pursuits and was a State district judge from 1812 to 1821.

Johnston was elected to the Seventeenth Congress, serving from March 4, 1821, to March 3, 1823; he was an unsuccessful candidate for reelection in 1822 to the Eighteenth Congress. On January 15, 1824, he was appointed to the U.S. Senate to fill the vacancy caused by the resignation of James Brown. He was then elected to the Senate for a full term in 1825 and reelected in 1831. While in the Senate, he was chairman of the Committee on Commerce (Nineteenth Congress). His sudden death was caused by an explosion on the steamboat Lioness on the Red River in Louisiana on May 19, 1833. Johnston was interred in Rapides Cemetery in Pineville, Louisiana.

== Family ==
His half-brother, Albert Sidney Johnston, was a Confederate Army general during the American Civil War. His son, J. Stoddard Johnston (1833–1913), a journalist and editor, also served during the War, eventually becoming Kentucky's Secretary of State.

== See also ==
- List of members of the United States Congress who died in office (1790–1899)

U.S. House of Representatives
| Preceded by Thomas Butler | Member of the U.S. House of Representatives from Louisiana's at-large congressional district 1821–1823 | Succeeded by Edward Livingston |
U.S. Senate
| Preceded by James Brown | U.S. senator (Class 3) from Louisiana; 1824–1833; Served alongside: Henry Johnson, Dominique Bouligny, Edward Livingston, George A. Waggaman | Succeeded by Alexander Porter |
