= James O'Connor (Louisiana politician) =

American politician

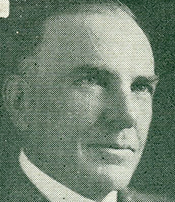

Member of the U.S. House of Representatives from Louisiana's 1st district
- In office June 5, 1919 – March 3, 1931
- Preceded by: Albert Estopinal
- Succeeded by: Joachim O. Fernández

Personal details
- Born: April 4, 1870 New Orleans, Louisiana
- Died: January 7, 1941 (aged 70) Covington, Louisiana
- Resting place: Metairie Cemetery, New Orleans
- Party: Democratic

James O'Connor (April 4, 1870 – January 7, 1941) was an American politician who served in the United States House of Representatives from Louisiana's 1st congressional district for six terms as a Democrat. He also served in the Louisiana House of Representatives from 1900 to 1912.

O'Connor was born in New Orleans, Louisiana on April 4, 1870, and went to law school at Tulane University, graduating in 1900. He was a member of the Louisiana House of Representatives from 1900 to 1912 and as assistant city attorney of Orleans Parish from 1918 until 1919, when on June 15, he was elected as a Democrat to the 66th congress of the U.S. House of Representatives. He was reelected to the 67th, 68th, 69th, 70th, and 71st congresses. He lost reelection to Joachim O. Fernández in 1930 and his term ended March 3, 1931. He resumed his law practice and died in Covington, Louisiana on January 7, 1941. He was buried in Metairie Cemetery.

U.S. House of Representatives
Preceded by Albert Estopinal	Member of the U.S. House of Representatives from Louisiana's 1st congressional district June 5, 1919 – March 3, 1931	Succeeded by Joachim O. Fernández
