= Phanor Breazeale =

American journalist (1858–1934)

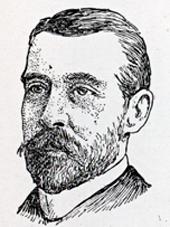
- Engraving of Phanor Breazeale

Member of the U.S. House of Representatives from Louisiana's 4th district
- In office March 4, 1899 – March 3, 1905
- Preceded by: Henry Warren Ogden
- Succeeded by: John T. Watkins

District Attorney for the 10th Judicial District of Louisiana
- In office 1892–1899

Personal details
- Born: December 29, 1858 Natchitoches Parish, Louisiana
- Died: April 29, 1934 (aged 75) Natchitoches, Louisiana
- Resting place: Catholic Cemetery in Natchitoches
- Party: Democratic
- Education: Tulane University Law School
- Occupation: Lawyer

Phanor Breazeale (December 29, 1858 – April 29, 1934) served three terms as a U.S. representative for Louisiana's 4th congressional district.

== Early life and education ==
Born in Natchitoches Parish in north central Louisiana, Breazeale attended private schools. In 1877, at the close of Reconstruction, he moved to Natchitoches, the parish seat.

He worked in a mercantile establishment for two years and studied law. He relocated to New Orleans, where he was a clerk in the Louisiana Supreme Court. He graduated in 1881 from the d Tulane University Law School in New Orleans and was admitted to the bar that same year.

== Early career ==
He began his law practice in Natchitoches, the oldest established city in the state. From 1882 to 1884, Breazeale was also engaged in newspaper work.

From 1888 to 1891, he was the president of the Natchitoches Parish School Board. He was elected district attorney for the 10th Judicial District, having served from 1892 to 1899. He was a member of the Louisiana state constitutional convention in 1898, which drew up a document in existence for twenty-three years. Thereafter, he was a member of the state constitutional convention of 1921.

== United States House of Representatives ==
Breazeale was elected as a Democrat to the Fifty-sixth, Fifty-seventh, and Fifty-eighth Congresses (March 4, 1899 – March 3, 1905). He was an unsuccessful candidate for renomination in 1904, having been defeated by the attorney John T. Watkins of Minden in Webster Parish.

== After Congress ==
After leaving the House, he resumed the practice of law in Natchitoches. He was appointed in October 1908 as a member of a commission to codify Louisiana's criminal laws and to prepare a code of criminal procedure.

Breazeale was a member of the Democratic State central committee from 1908 until his death. He was a delegate to the Democratic National Convention in 1908 and again in 1916.

== Death ==
Breazeale died in Natchitoches and is interred at the Catholic Cemetery there.

U.S. House of Representatives
Preceded by Henry Warren Ogden	Member of the U.S. House of Representatives from Louisiana's 4th congressional district 1899 – 1905	Succeeded by John T. Watkins
