= Henry Warren Ogden =

American politician (1842–1905)

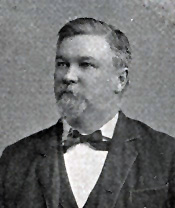

U.S. Representative from Louisiana's 4th congressional district
- In office May 12, 1894 – March 3, 1899
- Preceded by: Newton C. Blanchard
- Succeeded by: Phanor Breazeale

Louisiana State Representative from Bossier Parish
- In office 1880–1894
- Preceded by: John C. Vance
- Succeeded by: Robert Houston Curry

Speaker of the Louisiana House of Representatives
- In office 1884–1888
- Preceded by: Robert N. Ogden, Jr.
- Succeeded by: Samuel P. Henry

Member of the Louisiana House of Representatives
- In office 1879-1894

Personal details
- Born: October 21, 1842 Abingdon; Washington County; Virginia, USA
- Died: July 23, 1905 (aged 62) Benton, Bossier Parish; Louisiana
- Party: Democratic
- Occupation: Planter

Military service
- Allegiance: Confederate States of America
- Branch/service: Confederate States Army
- Rank: Lieutenant
- Unit: 16th Missouri Infantry
- Battles/wars: American Civil War

Henry Warren Ogden (October 21, 1842 – July 23, 1905) was a member of the United States House of Representatives for Louisiana's 4th congressional district.

== Biography ==
He was born in Abingdon in Washington County in far southwestern Virginia. In 1851, he moved with his parents to Warrensburg in Johnson County in west central Missouri, where he attended common schools.

During the American Civil War, he joined the Confederate States of America Army, despite living in a state that had remained within the Union. He rose to the rank of lieutenant. Ogden was a first lieutenant of Company D, Sixteenth Regiment, Missouri Infantry, and afterward on the staff of Brigadier General Lewis, Second Brigade, Parsons' division, Missouri Infantry. He was captured and held for one year as a prisoner of war. On June 8, 1865, he was paroled at Shreveport in Caddo Parish in northwestern Louisiana. There he remained and became a wealthy planter in adjacent Bossier Parish.

In 1879, Ogden was a member of the Louisiana constitutional convention and was elected to the Louisiana House of Representatives from Bossier Parish. He was the Speaker from 1884 to 1888. In 1894, he won a special election as a Democrat to the United States House of Representatives. The vacancy was created by the resignation of Newton C. Blanchard. Ogden was reelected to the Fifty-fourth and Fifty-fifth Congresses, having served from May 12, 1894, to March 3, 1899. He left Congress in 1899 to return to his farm and died six years later in Benton, the Bossier Parish seat of government.

U.S. House of Representatives
Preceded by Newton C. Blanchard	U.S. Representative from Louisiana's 4th congressional district Henry Warren Ogden; 1894–1899	Succeeded by Phanor Breazeale
Preceded by John C. Vance	Louisiana State Representative for Bossier Parish; Henry Warren Ogden; 1880–1894	Succeeded by Robert Houston Curry
Preceded by Robert N. Ogden, Jr. of Orleans Parish	Speaker of the Louisiana House of Representatives; Henry Warren Ogden; 1884–1888	Succeeded by Samuel P. Henry of Cameron Parish
