= Theodore S. Wilkinson (politician) =

American politician

Theodore Stark Wilkinson
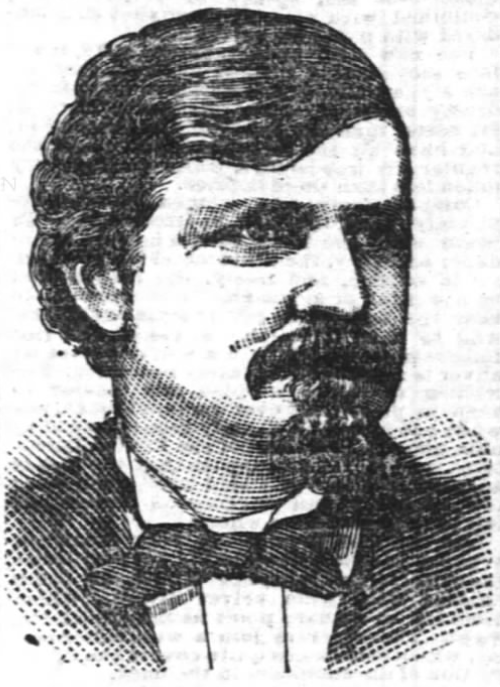

Member of the U.S. House of Representatives from Louisiana's 1st congressional district
- In office March 4, 1887 – March 3, 1891
- Preceded by: Louis St. Martin
- Succeeded by: Adolph Meyer

Personal details
- Born: December 18, 1847 Plaquemines Parish, Louisiana
- Died: February 1, 1921 (aged 73) New Orleans, Louisiana
- Party: Democratic
- Occupation: Plantation owner, politician

Theodore Stark Wilkinson (December 18, 1847 – February 1, 1921) was a member of the U. S. House of Representatives representing the state of Louisiana. He served two terms as a Democrat. After leaving office, he was appointed collector of the U.S. Custom House at New Orleans by President Grover Cleveland.

Wilkinson was born on the Point Celeste plantation in Plaquemines Parish. As an adult, he owned the largest sugar plantations in lower Plaquemines, with one encompassing nine miles of Mississippi River riverfront. He also ran unsuccessfully for governor of Louisiana in 1908. He died from heart failure in New Orleans on February 1, 1921.

His great-grandfather was James Wilkinson, the scandalous first governor of the Louisiana Territory who was later exposed as a paid spy for the Spanish Empire. He was also the uncle of another Theodore Stark Wilkinson who would become vice-admiral of the United States Navy during World War II.

U.S. House of Representatives
Preceded by Louis St. Martin	United States Representative for the 1st Congressional District of Louisiana; 1887-1891	Succeeded by Adolph Meyer
