= Emile La Sére =

American politician

Member of the U.S. House of Representatives from Louisiana's 1st district
- In office January 29, 1846 – March 3, 1851
- Preceded by: John Slidell
- Succeeded by: Louis St. Martin

Personal details
- Born: 1802 Santo Domingo
- Died: August 14, 1882 (aged 79–80) New Orleans, Louisiana
- Resting place: Metairie Cemetery, New Orleans
- Party: Democratic

Emile La Sére (1802 – August 14, 1882) was a member of the U. S. House of Representatives representing the first district in the state of Louisiana. He served three terms as a Democrat.

== Early life ==
Le Sére was born on Santo Domingo. His family moved to New Orleans in 1805, where Le Sére was raised and educated. Some sources indicate that he attended the United States Military Academy or Transylvania College as a contemporary of Jefferson Davis, but there is no record that he attended either. Le Sére was well-trained for a career in business, and is known to have been fluent in English, French, and Spanish.

After completing his education, Le Sére worked as a clerk in Jackson, Louisiana and Mexico mercantile business establishments for several years before returning to New Orleans. A Democrat and political ally of John Slidell, among the ventures in which they were interested was publication of the Louisiana Courier newspaper, which also enabled La Sére to obtain appointment as Louisiana's state printer. In 1840, Le Sére was elected sheriff of the New Orleans Commercial Court, and he served until 1845.

== U.S. Representative ==
In 1846, he was elected to the U.S. House of Representatives in a special election held to fill the vacancy caused by Slidell's resignation. He was elected to two full terms, and served from January 29, 1846 to March 3, 1851 (the 29th, 30th, and 31st Congresses). During the 29th Congress, he was chairman of the Committee on Expenditures in the Post Office Department.

== Later life ==
When President Antonio López de Santa Anna returned to power in Mexico in 1853, Benito Juárez went into exile in New Orleans. Le Sére hosted Juárez for two years, until Santa Anna's 1855 resignation enabled him to return to Mexico. During the administration of President Franklin Pierce, he served as disbursing agent for the New Orleans Mint.

During the American Civil War, Le Sére served in the Confederate States Army, first as major of the 10th Louisiana Regiment, and later as chief quartermaster of the Trans-Mississippi Department. In 1864, he was appointed the Confederacy's commercial agent in Mexico.

Le Sére was a delegate to numerous local, county, state, and national Democratic conventions and served as chairman of Louisiana's Democratic State central committee for more than fifteen years. Among his post-war ventures was serving as president of the Tehuantepec Railroad Company in Mexico.

== Death and burial ==
Le Sére died in New Orleans on August 14, 1882. He was buried at Metairie Cemetery in New Orleans. Le Sére never married, and had no children.

U.S. House of Representatives
Preceded by John Slidell	United States Representative for the 1st congressional district of Louisiana; 1846–1851	Succeeded by Louis St. Martin
