= Louisiana's at-large congressional district =

- Obsolete district
- Created: 1812; 1873
- Eliminated: 1823; 1875
- Years active: 1812-1823; 1873-1875

From the time of its admission to the Union in 1812, until the division into multiple districts a decade later, Louisiana had only one congressional district. During that time, three people represented the state at-large.

== List of members representing the district ==
Representative	Party	Years	Cong ress	Electoral history
Statehood achieved April 30, 1812
Thomas B. Robertson (New Orleans)	Democratic-Republican	April 30, 1812 – April 20, 1818	12th 13th 14th 15th	Elected to finish the term. Also elected in 1812 to the next term. Re-elected in 1814. Re-elected in 1816. Resigned.
Vacant		April 20, 1818 – November 16, 1818	15th	
Thomas Butler (St. Francisville)	Democratic-Republican	November 16, 1818 – March 3, 1821	15th 16th	Elected to finish Robertson's term. Also elected in 1818 to the next term. Lost renomination.
Josiah S. Johnston (Alexandria)	Democratic-Republican	March 4, 1821 – March 3, 1823	17th	Elected in 1820. Redistricted to the 3rd district and lost re-election.
District inactive, returned to district representation

In the 43rd Congress, Louisiana had six representatives. Five were assigned a district and one represented the state at-large. Due to an election contest for the at-large seat, it was vacant until the very last day.

Representative	Party	Years	Cong ress	Electoral history
George A. Sheridan (Lake Providence)	Liberal Republican	March 3, 1875 – March 4, 1875	43rd	Elected in 1872. Election contested by P. B. S. Pinchback and settled in Sheridan's favor only one month before the end of the Congress. Retired.

At-large seat eliminated March 4, 1875, as all six seats were divided among six districts.
