= Adolph Meyer =

American politician

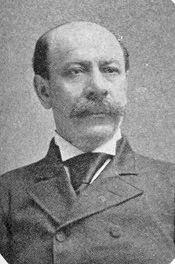

Member of the U.S. House of Representatives from Louisiana's 1st district
- In office March 4, 1891 – March 8, 1908
- Preceded by: Theodore S. Wilkinson
- Succeeded by: Albert Estopinal

Personal details
- Born: Adolph Meyer; October 19, 1842 Natchez, Mississippi
- Died: March 8, 1908 (aged 65) New Orleans, Louisiana
- Resting place: New Orleans, Louisiana
- Party: Democratic
- Education: University of Virginia
- Profession: Banker, Planter

Military service
- Allegiance: United States; Confederate States of America
- Branch/service: Confederate States Army; Louisiana National Guard
- Years of service: 1862–1865 (CSA)
- Rank: Assistant Adjutant General
- Battles/wars: American Civil War

Adolph Meyer (October 19, 1842 – March 8, 1908) was a Confederate veteran of the Civil War who served as a member of the U. S. House of Representatives representing the state of Louisiana. He served nine terms as a Democrat from 1891 until his death in office in 1908.

== Biography ==
Meyer was born in to a Jewish family of German descent in Natchez, Mississippi.

=== Confederate States Army ===
During the Civil War, Meyer served in the Confederate Army on the staff of Brigadier General John Stuart Williams of Kentucky and attained the rank of assistant adjutant general. A planter in Mississippi and a banker in New Orleans, he served in the Louisiana National Guard, attaining the rank of brigadier general in 1881.

=== Congress ===
In 1890, he was elected to his first of nine consecutive terms in the U.S. House of Representatives. He served until his death on October 19, 1908 at the age of 65.

== Namesakes ==
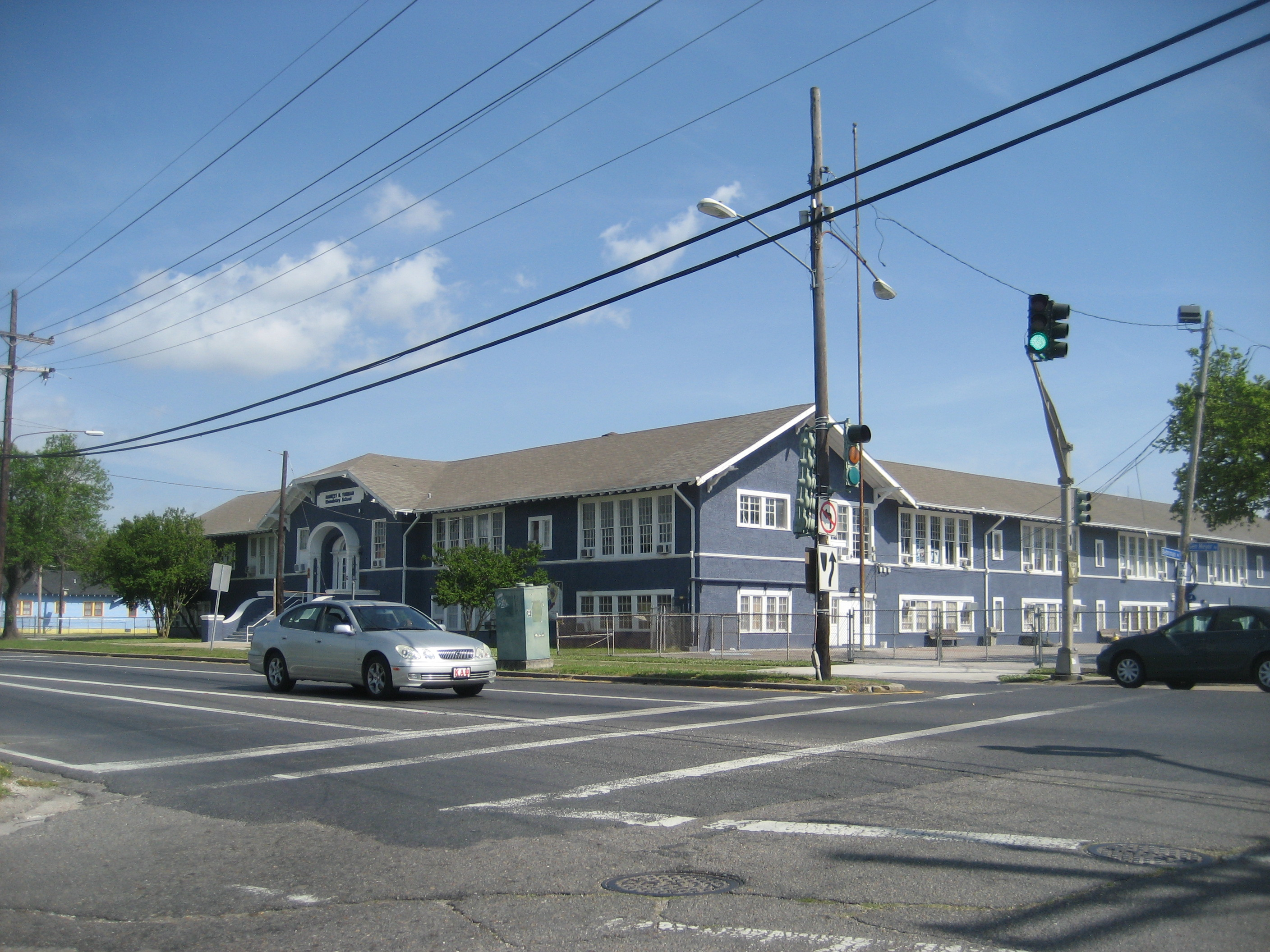
Harriet Tubman Elementary school, formerly Adolph S. Meyer Elementary School

General Meyer Avenue in the Algiers neighborhood in New Orleans is named in his honor for his efforts in lobbying for a U.S. Naval Yard in that area. The Avenue begins as Newton Street in Algiers Point, changes name to General Meyer Avenue at Behrman Avenue, and continues for approximately 4 miles, ending at Bennett Street in the Lower Algiers neighborhood.

The Adolph Meyer School (1917) was a school in Algiers on General Meyer Avenue; renamed to honor Harriet Tubman in the 1990s, the facility operates today as Harriet Tubman Charter School, one of Crescent City Schools' three charter elementary schools. In 2016, the building was listed on the National Register of Historic Places. It is located at the southeast corner of General Meyer and Behrman, across from the U.S. Naval Station Algiers Historic District and the city's Federal City complex.

== See also ==
- List of Jewish members of the United States Congress
- List of members of the United States Congress who died in office (1900–1949)

U.S. House of Representatives
Preceded by Theodore Stark Wilkinson	United States Representative for the 1st Congressional District of Louisiana; 1891-1908	Succeeded by Albert Estopinal
