= Jimmie Davis =

American singer, songwriter, and 47th Governor of Louisiana (1899–2000)

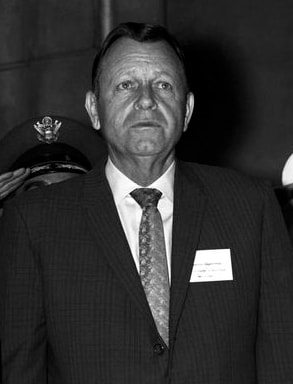
- Davis in 1962

47th Governor of Louisiana
- In office May 10, 1960 – May 12, 1964
- Lieutenant: Taddy Aycock
- Preceded by: Earl Long
- Succeeded by: John McKeithen
- In office May 9, 1944 – May 11, 1948
- Lieutenant: J. Emile Verret
- Preceded by: Sam H. Jones
- Succeeded by: Earl Long

Personal details
- Born: James Houston Davis; September 11, 1899 Quitman, Louisiana, U.S.
- Died: November 5, 2000 (aged 101) Baton Rouge, Louisiana, U.S.
- Resting place: Jimmie Davis Tabernacle Cemetery, Quitman, Louisiana
- Party: Democratic
- Spouse(s): Alvern Adams (died 1967) Anna Gordon (m. 1968)
- Children: 1
- Education: Louisiana Christian University (BA); Louisiana State University (MA)
- Profession: Singer, songwriter, former educator, politician

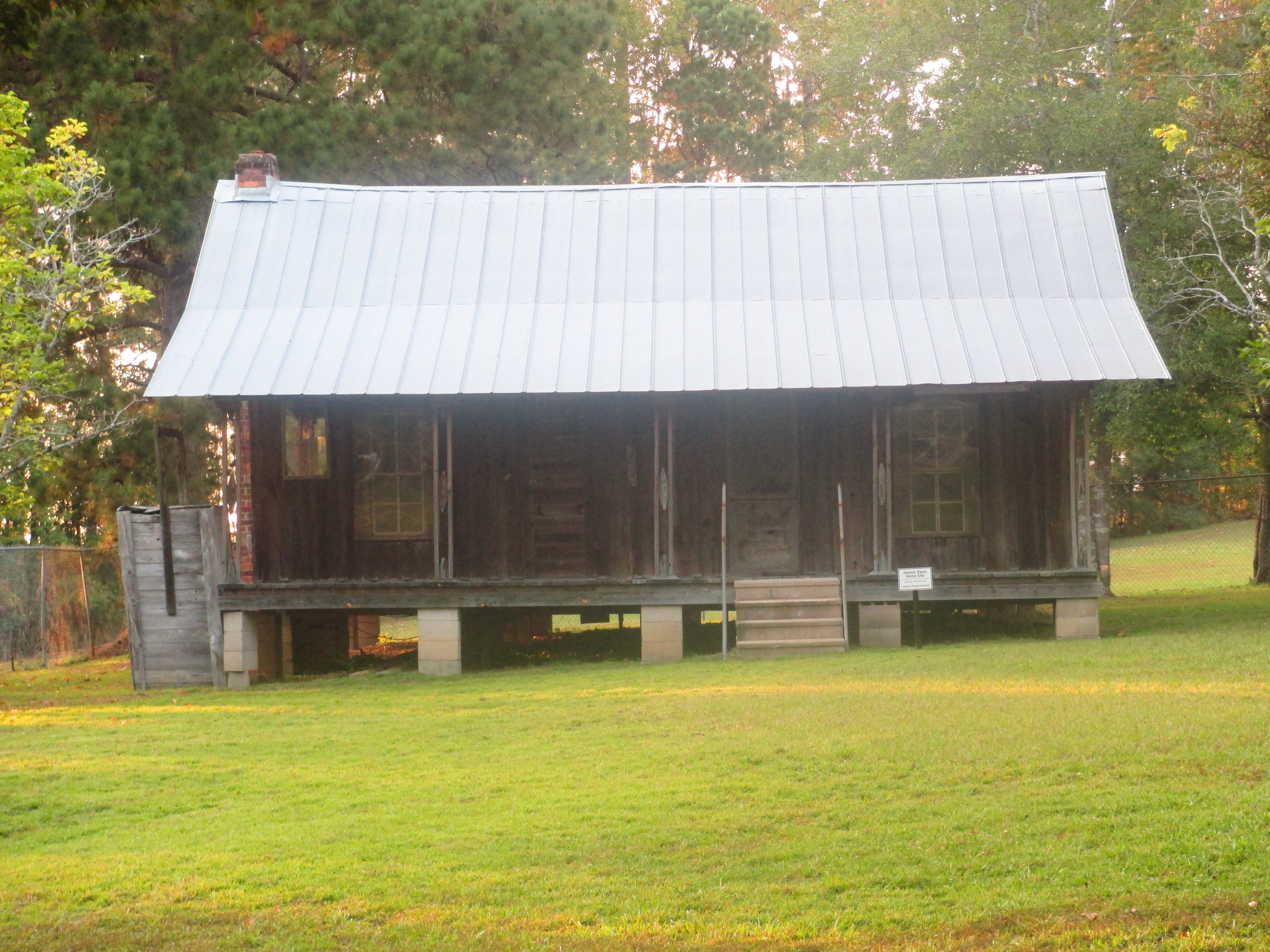
Davis homestead in Jackson Parish

James Houston Davis (September 11, 1899 – November 5, 2000) was an American singer, songwriter, and Democratic Party politician. After achieving fame for releasing both sacred and country songs, Davis served as the 47th governor of Louisiana from 1944 to 1948 and again from 1960 to 1964.

Davis was a nationally popular country music and gospel singer from the 1930s into the 1960s, helping country music gain appeal beyond the rural southern U.S. and occasionally recording and performing as late as the early 1990s. His most popular song, a cover of "You Are My Sunshine", was released in 1940 and would become Louisiana's official state song. He appeared as himself in a number of Hollywood movies. He was inducted into six halls of fame, including the Country Music Hall of Fame, the Southern Gospel Music Association Hall of Fame, and the Louisiana Music Hall of Fame.

First elected in 1944, Davis served two non-consecutive terms as governor of Louisiana, during which he implemented the first driver's licensing, public employee pension, and civil service systems in Louisiana and opposed desegregation. At the time of his death in 2000, he was the oldest living former governor as well as the last living governor to have been born in the 19th century. He is also the only U.S. governor to have lived in the 1800s, the 1900s, and the 2000s.

== Early life and career ==
=== Childhood and birth date confusion ===
Davis was born in Quitman, Louisiana, as one of 11 children to sharecropper parents. He was not sure of his date of birth; according to The New York Times, "Various newspaper and magazine articles over the last 70 years said he was born in 1899, 1901, 1902 or 1903. He told The New York Times several years ago that his sharecropper parents could never recall just when he was born – he was, after all, one of 11 children – and that he had not had the slightest idea when it really was." The birth date listed on his Country Music Hall of Fame plaque is September 11, 1904.

=== Education ===
Davis graduated from Beech Springs High School and Soule Business College, before completing a bachelor's degree at Louisiana College (now Louisiana Christian University) in 1924. He graduated from Louisiana State University in 1927 with a Master of Arts in psychology; his thesis, which examines the intelligence levels of different races, is titled Comparative Intelligence of Whites, Blacks and Mulattoes.

=== Career beginnings ===
During the late 1920s, Davis taught history and social studies for a year at the former Dodd College for Girls in Shreveport. The college president, Monroe E. Dodd, who was also the pastor of First Baptist Church of Shreveport and a radio preacher, invited Davis to serve on the faculty. During his teaching career, Davis also performed music on Friday nights for Shreveport radio station KWKH.

== Musical career ==
Davis became a commercially successful singer of rural music before he entered politics. His "smooth vocal style...helped popularize country music far beyond its original rural southern audience," wrote Michael Gray for Country.com in 2000. Davis signed his first recording contract with Victor Talking Machine Company in 1929. His early work was in the style of country music singer Jimmie Rodgers. Davis was also known for recording energetic and raunchy blues tunes, such as "Red Nightgown Blues" and "Tom Cat and Pussy Blues", which political opponents would cite in negative campaigning. Some of these records included slide guitar accompaniment by black bluesman Oscar "Buddy" Woods.

In 1934, Davis signed with Decca Records and achieved his first major hit, "Nobody's Darlin' But Mine".

Davis would record his most successful song, a rendition of the traditional "You Are My Sunshine", in 1940. There would be over 300 covers, including in 1941 by Gene Autry and Bing Crosby. In 1977, Louisiana Governor Edwin Edwards signed a bill designating "You Are My Sunshine" as Louisiana's official state song. In 1999, the song was honored with a Grammy Hall of Fame Award, and the Recording Industry Association of America named it one of the Songs of the Century. "You Are My Sunshine" was ranked in 2003 as No. 73 on CMT's 100 Greatest Songs in Country Music.

Davis often performed during his campaign stops when running for governor of Louisiana. After being elected in 1944, he became known as the "singing governor." While governor, he had a No. 1 hit single in 1945 with "There's a New Moon over My Shoulder".

On September 15, 1951, Davis performed for the first time at the Grand Ole Opry.

Davis is credited for popularizing the gospel classic "Suppertime" in the early 1950s. According to the American Songwriter magazine, the song's success led him to start recording gospel material – when Davis found that "songs like [this] appealed to gospel listeners", "he began recording and releasing sacred songs."

A long-time Southern Baptist, he recorded a number of Southern gospel albums.

In 1967 he served as president of the Gospel Music Association. He was a close friend of the North Dakota-born band leader Lawrence Welk, who frequently reminded viewers of his television program of his association with Davis.

A number of his songs were used as part of motion picture soundtracks. Davis appeared in half a dozen films, including one starring Ozzie and Harriet, who had a TV series under their names. Members of Davis's last band included Allen "Puddler" Harris of Lake Charles. He had served as pianist for singer Ricky Nelson early in his career.

Davis was also a close acquaintance of the country singer-songwriter Hank Williams, with whom he co-wrote the top-10 hit "(I Heard That) Lonesome Whistle" in 1951, supposedly on a fishing day they spent together. They also performed together on KWKH's Louisiana Hayride.

=== Singles ===
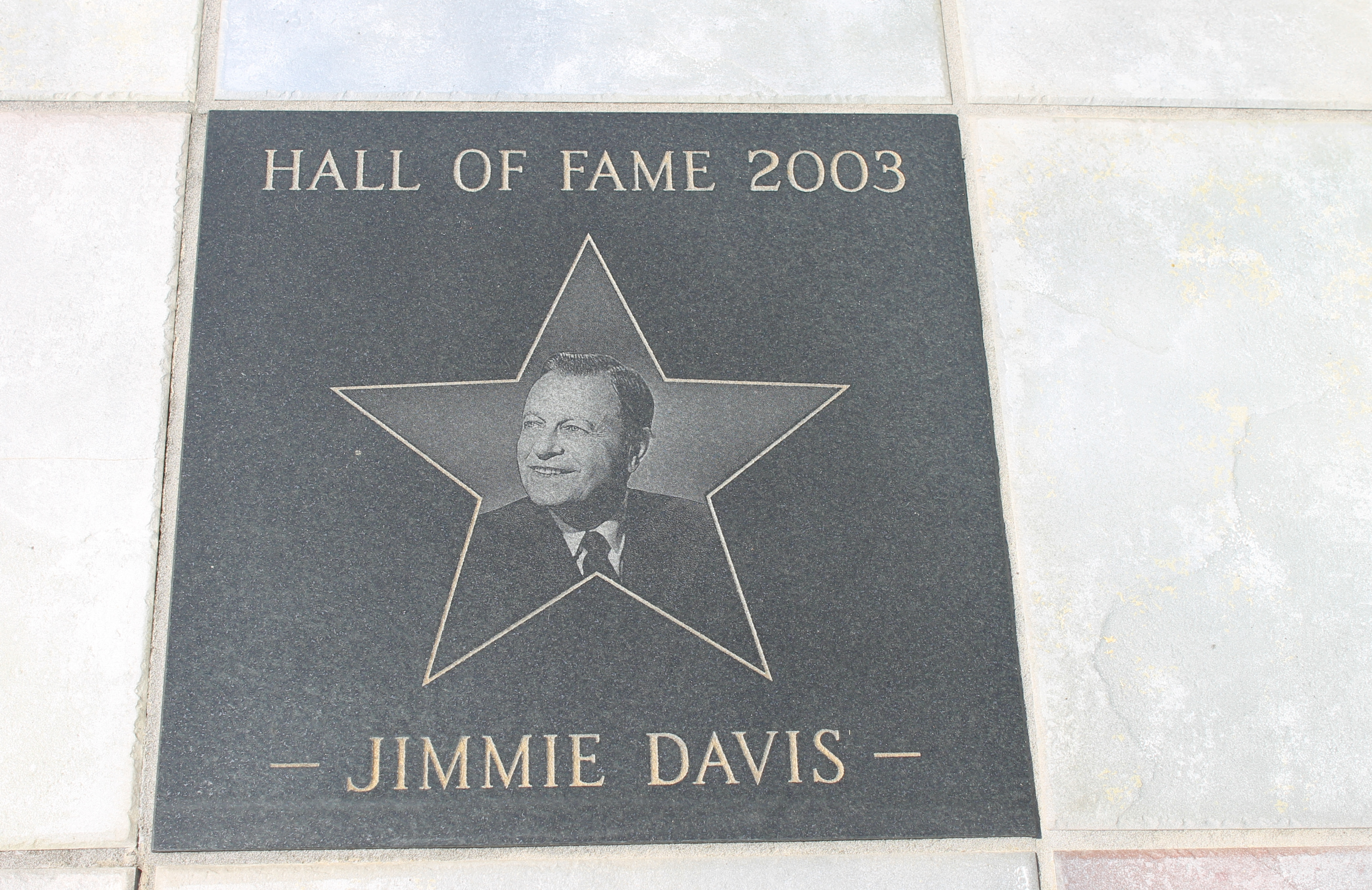
Davis was posthumously inducted in 2003 into the Delta Music Museum Hall of Fame in Ferriday, Louisiana

Year	Single	US Country
1934	"Nobody's Darling but Mine"	—
1937	"Nobody's Darling but Mine" Jimmie Davis With Charles Mitchell And His Texan	—
1938	"Meet Me Tonight in Dreamland"	—
1938	"There's a Gold Mine in the Sky"	—
1939	"Two More Years (and I’ll Be Free)"	1
1939	"It Makes No Difference Now"	1
1939	"The Last Trip of the Old Ship"	2
1939	"Memories"	5
1940	"I’d Love to Call You My Sweetheart"	1
1940	"Baby Your Mother"	2
1940	"You're as Welcome as the Flowers in May"	6
1940	"You Are My Sunshine"	—
1941	"I'm Sorry Now"	3
1942	"I've Got My Heart on My Sleeve"	3
1942	"You'll Be Sorry"	4
1942	"Sweethearts or Strangers"	6
1942	"I Loved You Once"	6
1942	"Don't You Cry Over Me"	6
1942	"The End of the World"	7
1942	"What More Can I Say"	8
1942	"I'm Thinking Tonight of My Blue Eyes"	10
1943	"Columbus Stockade Blues"	2
1943	"Where Is My Boy Tonight"	7
1943	"I'm Knocking at Your Door Again"	7
1943	"I Dreamed of an Old Love Affair"	8
1943	"A Sinner's Prayer"	13
1944	"Is It Too Late Now"	3
1944	"There's a Chill on the Hill Tonight"	4
1945	"There's a New Moon over My Shoulder"	1
1946	"Grievin' My Heart Out for You"	4
1947	"Bang Bang"	4
1951	"(I Heard That) Lonesome Whistle"	9
1953	"Suppertime" (with Anita Kerr Singers)	— (Note: Charted on the Billboard Most Programed Sacred Records.)
1962	"Where the Old Red River Flows"	15

== Political career ==
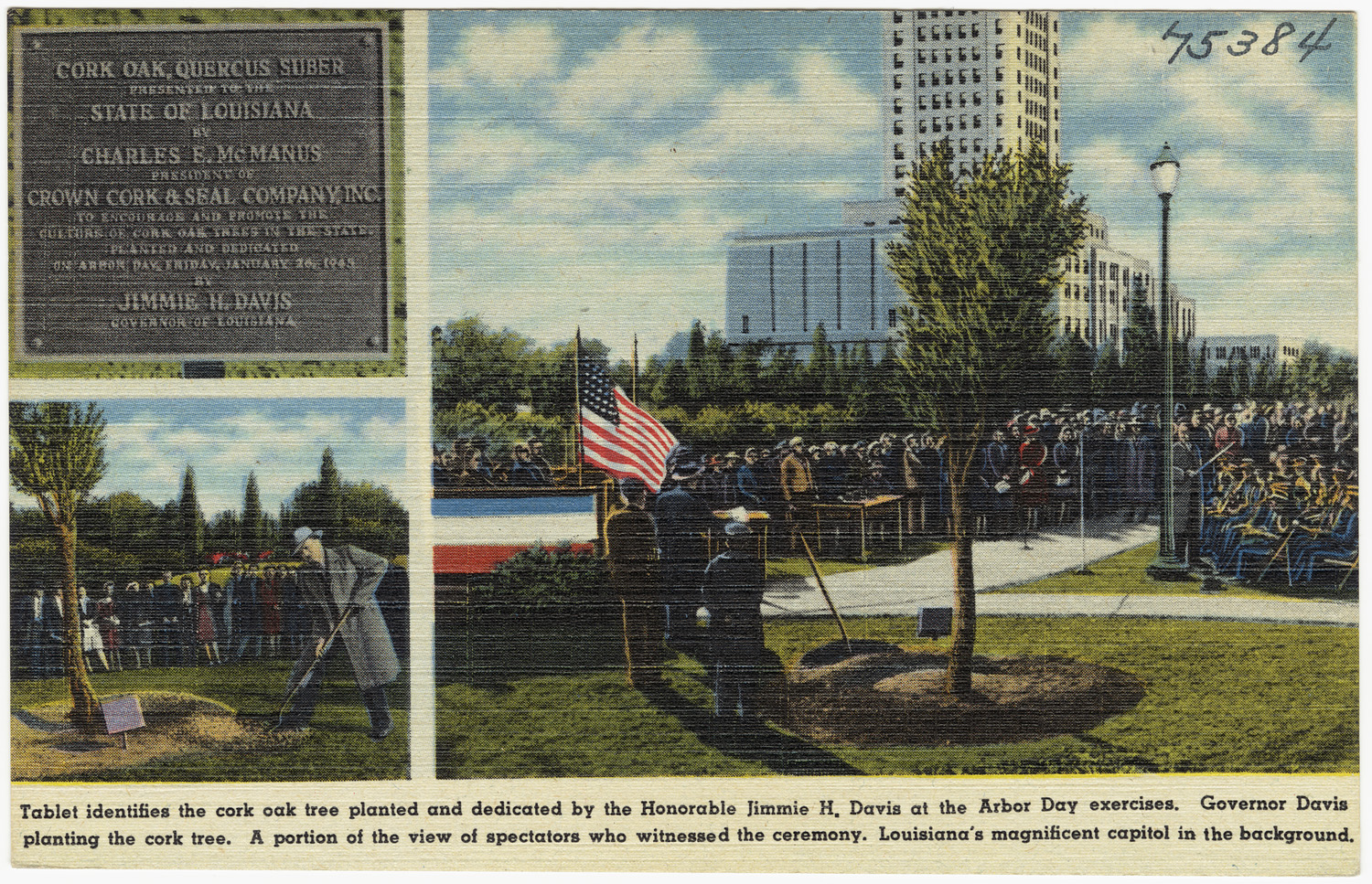
Cork oak tree planted and dedicated by Davis

In 1938, Davis became public safety commissioner for Shreveport's city commission government and was promoted to the Louisiana Public Service Commission in 1942.

=== First term as governor (1944–1948) ===
Davis was elected governor as a Democrat in 1944. Among those eliminated in the primary were State Senator Ernest S. Clements of Oberlin in Allen Parish, freshman U.S. Representative James H. Morrison of Hammond in Tangipahoa Parish, and Sam Caldwell, the mayor of Shreveport. Davis and Caldwell had served together earlier in Shreveport municipal government.

In the runoff, Davis defeated Lewis L. Morgan, an elderly attorney and former U.S. representative from Covington, the seat of St. Tammany Parish, who had been backed by former Governor Earl Kemp Long and New Orleans Mayor Robert Maestri. In the runoff, Davis received 251,228 (53.6 percent) to Morgan's 217,915 (46.4 percent).

Louisiana established its first civil service system under Davis, who appointed two of the leaders of the impeachment effort against Huey Long. He named Cecil Morgan of Shreveport to the Louisiana Civil Service Commission. Morgan was succeeded in the Louisiana House by Rupert Peyton of Shreveport, who also served as an aide to Davis. In addition, Davis retained the anti-Long Ralph Norman Bauer of St. Mary Parish as House speaker, a selection made originally in 1940 by Sam Jones.

Earl Long was seeking the lieutenant governorship on the Lewis Morgan "ticket" and led in the first primary in 1944, but he lost the runoff to J. Emile Verret of New Iberia, then the president of the Iberia Parish School Board.

Davis kept his hand in show business, and set a record for absenteeism during his first term. He made numerous trips to Hollywood to make Western "horse operas."

Under the term limit provision of the state constitution then in effect, Davis was limited to a single non-consecutive term in office.

During Davis’s first term as governor, a number of progressive measures were carried out including additional money for school lunches, increased welfare benefits, new tuberculosis hospitals, and a near-doubling of a per-pupil appropriation for education. This latter measure gave education “the biggest boost in the state’s history,” according to one observer. Additionally, Davis signed legislation creating a driver's licensing system, even going as far as to be the first licensed driver under this system. Other legislation signed by Davis funded the construction of new hospitals and roads, raised teachers' salaries, and created the state employee pension fund, the Louisiana State Employees’ Retirement System (LASERS).

=== The election of 1959–1960 ===
When he became a candidate for a second term in 1959–60, Davis had been out of office for nearly a dozen years. In a later study of this election, three Louisiana State University political scientists described him by the following:

Davis has all the external attributes of a "man of the people", but his serious political connections seem to be with the [parish-seat] elite and its allies, particularly the major industrial combinations of the state. He is in many respects a toned-down version of the old-style southern politician who could spellbound the mass of voters into supporting him regardless of the effects of his programs on their welfare. ... Davis creates the perfect image of a man to be trusted and one whose intense calm is calculated to bring rational balance into the political life of the state.

Pledging to fight for continued segregation in public education in the wake of such court decisions as Brown v. Board of Education, Davis won the Democratic gubernatorial nomination over William M. Rainach and deLesseps Morrison.

Davis ran second in the primary to Morrison, considered an anti-Long liberal by Louisiana standards. He defeated Morrison in the party runoff held on January 9, 1960. As African Americans (who had supported the Republican Party after the Civil War) were still largely disenfranchised in Louisiana, the Democratic primary was the only competitive race for office in the one-party state.

It has been reported that had General Curtis LeMay turned down George C. Wallace's offer to be his candidate for vice president in 1968 on the American Independent Party ticket, that Wallace was ready to announce Davis as his selection for vice president. Other sources say Wallace's second choice was the former governor of Arkansas Orval Faubus.

=== Second term (1960–1964) ===
As part of his support of segregation, Davis initiated passage of state legislation to create the Louisiana State Sovereignty Commission, which operated from 1960 to 1967. It "espoused states rights, anti-communist and segregationist ideas, with a particular focus on maintaining the status quo in race relations. It was closely allied with the Louisiana Joint Legislative Committee on Un-American Activities." It was modeled after Mississippi's commission, established in 1956 to resist integration. Davis tapped Frank Voelker Jr., City Attorney of Lake Providence, to chair the newly established Commission. It was given unusual powers to investigate state citizens, and used its authority to exert economic pressure to suppress civil rights activists. Voelker left the commission in 1963 to run for governor; he withdrew and supported other candidates.

=== Political legacy ===
Davis established a State Retirement System and funding of more than $100 million in public improvements, while leaving the state with a $38 million surplus after his first term. During his time as governor, Davis raised expenditure on health, education and highways while extending several social welfare programs. New charity hospitals and trade schools were also built, while educational programs for developmentally disabled children were launched. Furthermore, taxes did not increase during his administrations.

Earl Long once remarked that Davis was so relaxed and low-key that one could not "wake up Jimmie Davis with an earthquake".

Public relations specialist Gus Weill, who worked in the Davis campaign in 1959, wrote a biography of the former governor in 1977, entitled You Are My Sunshine, based on Davis' best-known song.

== Personal life ==
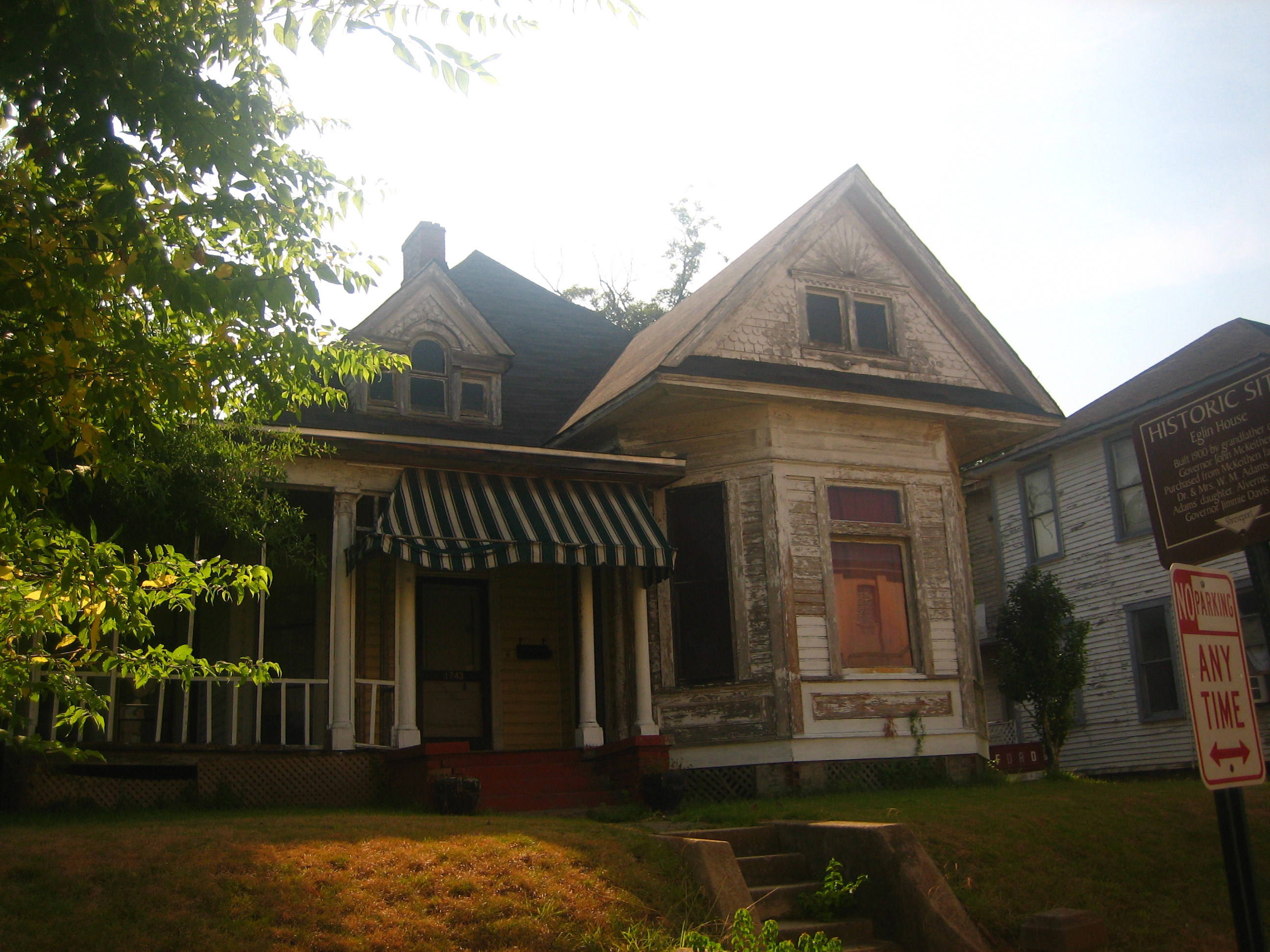
Davis married the former Alvern Adams in this historic Shreveport house in the Highlands neighborhood. It was formerly owned by the Eglins, the maternal grandparents of John J. McKeithen.

Davis's first wife, the former Alvern Adams, the daughter of a physician in Shreveport, was the first lady while he was governor during both terms. A little over a year after Alvern's death in 1967, Davis married the widowed Anna Gordon (February 15, 1917 – March 5, 2004) in a small ceremony in Ringgold, Georgia on December 9, 1968 (The Tennessean). Anna was born Effie Juanita Carter and had been a founding member of the gospel quartet The Chuck Wagon Gang along with her father, a sister and a brother. She had been given the stage name "Anna" during the mid-1930s. Davis was a longtime fan of the group, who were gospel music pioneers with more than 36 million records sold in forty years of affiliation with Columbia Records.

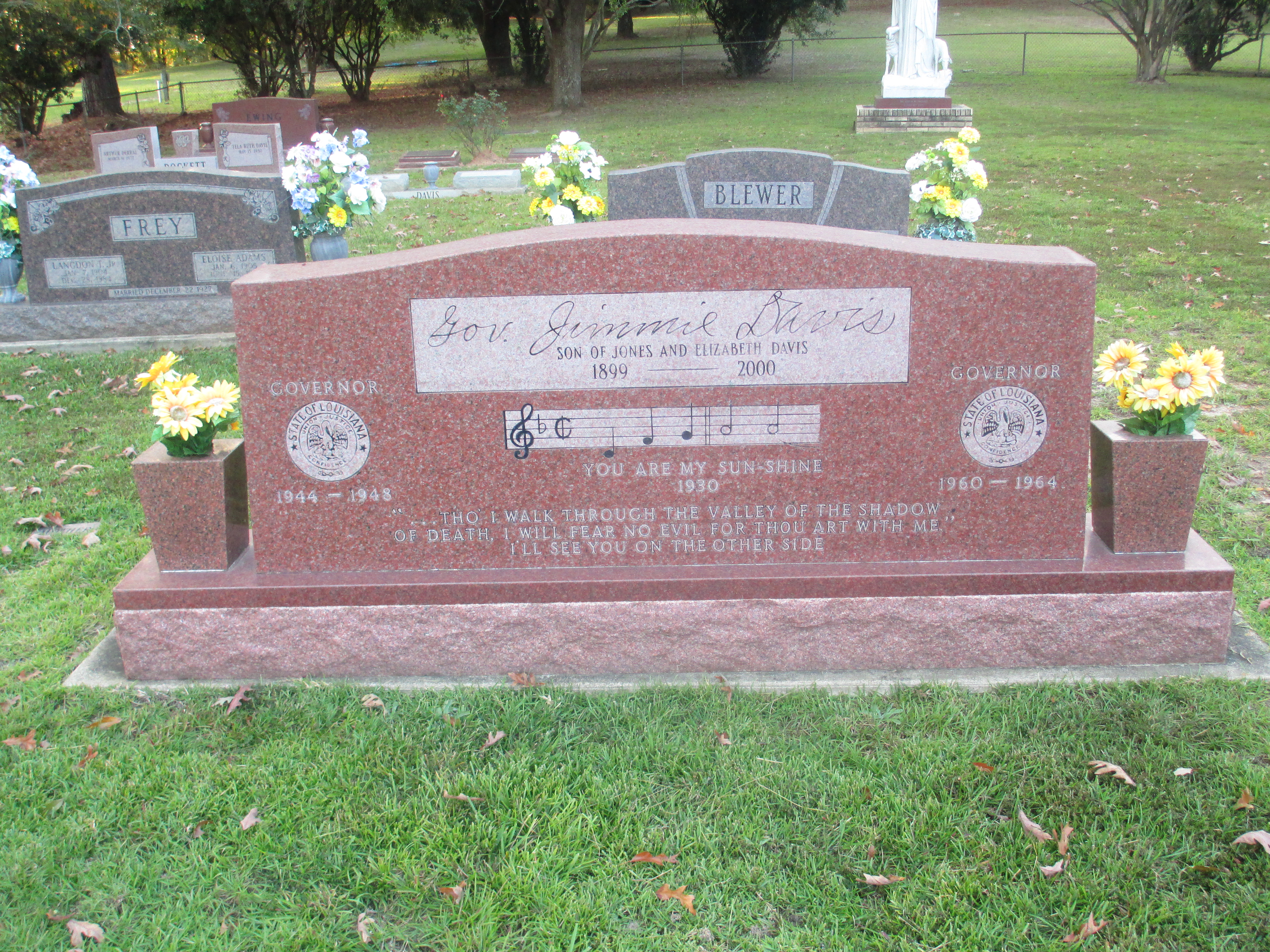
Davis' grave located in a small cemetery behind the tabernacle

In January 2000, Davis was hospitalized in Baton Rouge after a fall. He died in his sleep from a stroke 10 months later on November 5 at the age of 101. He is interred alongside his first wife at the Jimmie Davis Tabernacle Cemetery in his native Beech Springs community near Quitman.

Davis was aged 101 years and 55 days, which made him the longest-lived of all U.S. state governors at the time of his death. Davis held this record until March 18, 2011, when Albert Rosellini of Washington achieved a greater lifespan of 101 years, 262 days.

== Honors ==
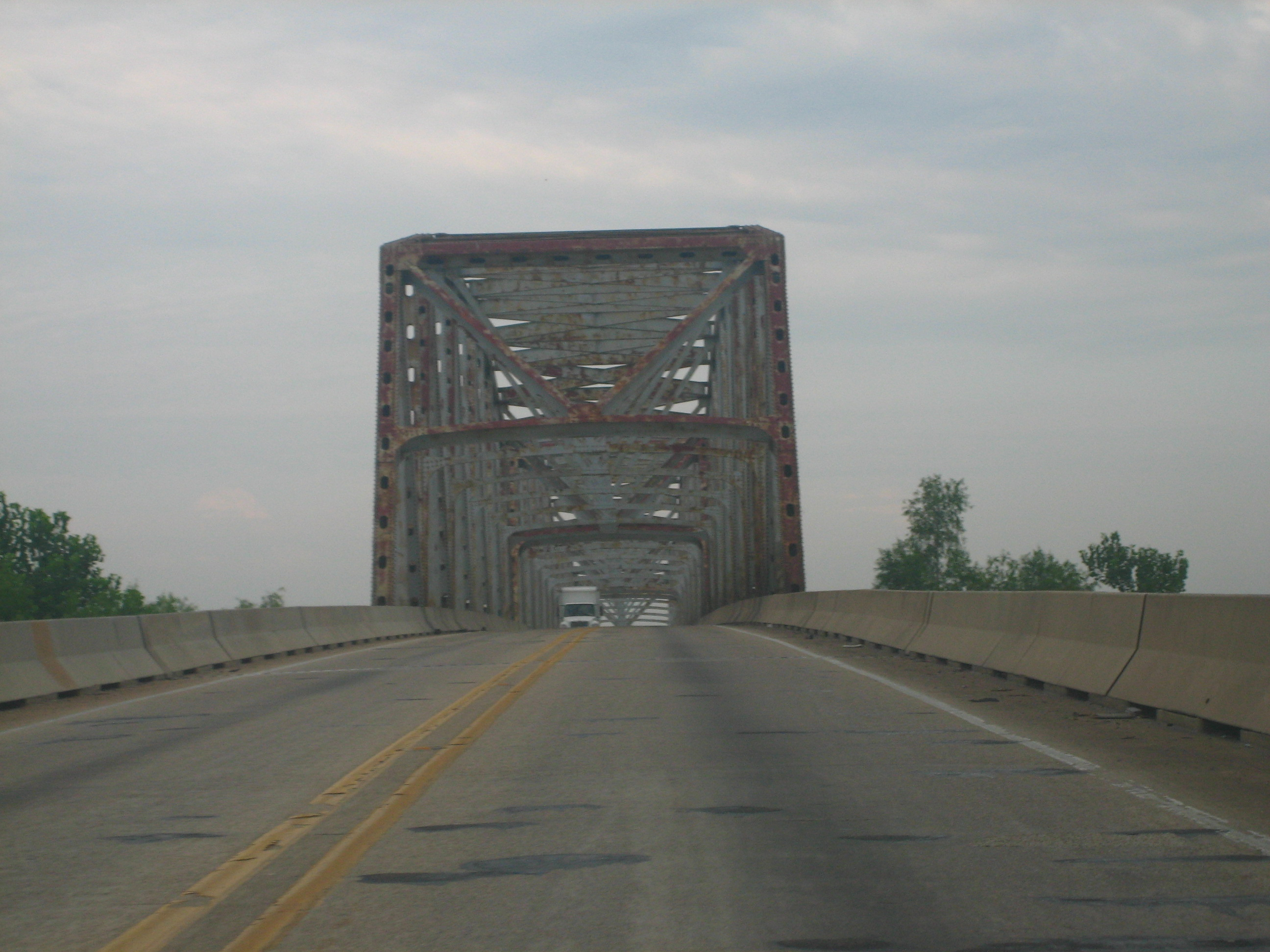
The Jimmie Davis Bridge over the Red River on Louisiana State Highway 511, connecting Shreveport and Bossier City

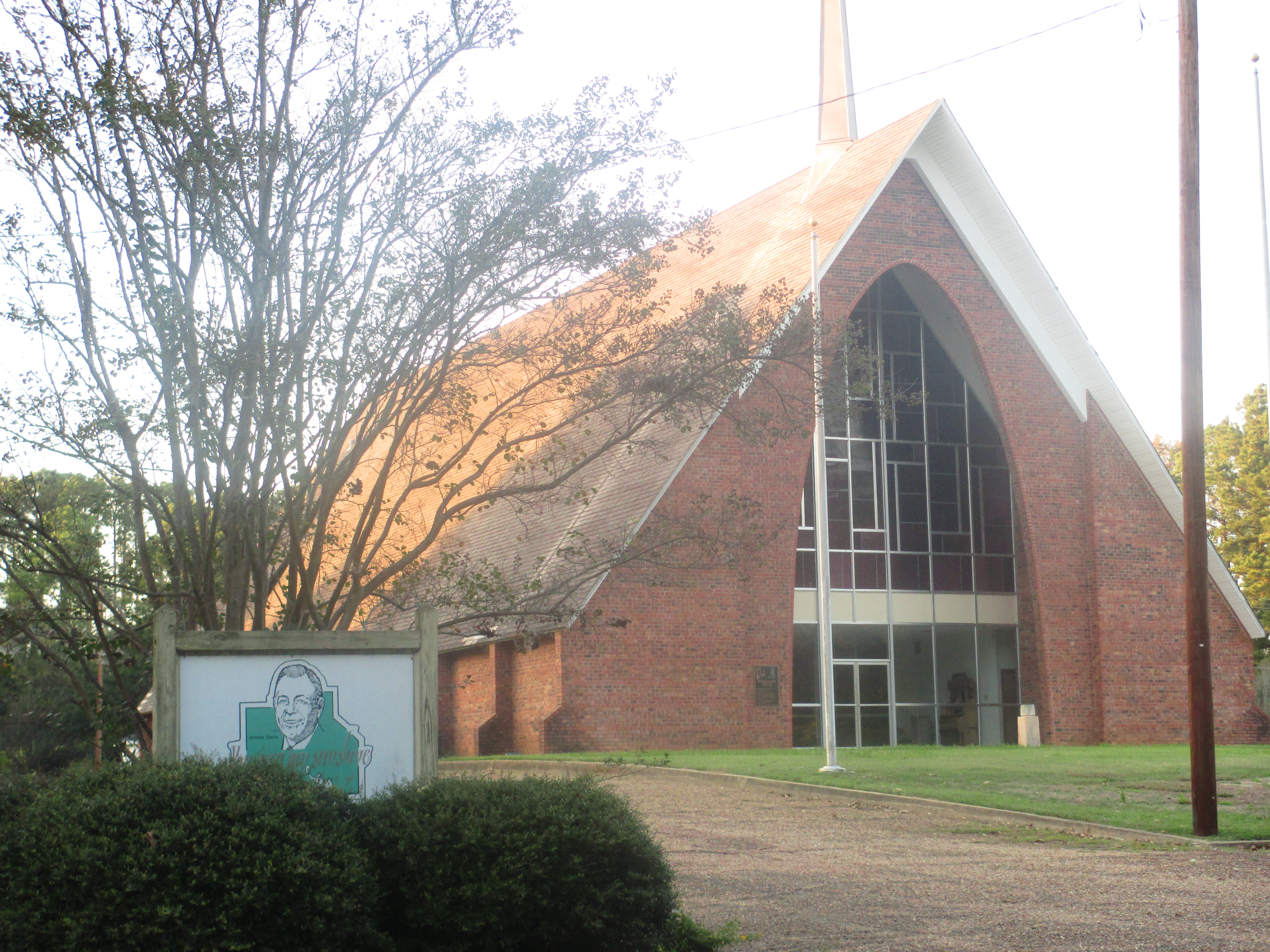
Jimmie Davis Tabernacle west of Quitman

The Jimmie Davis Tabernacle is located near Weston in Jackson Parish. The tabernacle hosts occasional gospel singing. At the site is a replica of the Davis homestead (c. 1900) and of the Peckerwood Hill Store, an old general store that served the community.

Davis was inducted into the Nashville Songwriters Hall of Fame in 1971, the Country Music Hall of Fame in 1972, the Southern Gospel Music Association Hall of Fame in 1997 and The Louisiana Music Hall of Fame in 2008. In 1993, Davis was among the first thirteen inductees of the Louisiana Political Museum and Hall of Fame in Winnfield.

The Davis archives of papers and photographs is housed in the "You Are My Sunshine" Collection of the Linus A. Sims Memorial Library at Southeastern Louisiana University in Hammond.

== Filmography ==
Davis had several appearances in movies (usually or always as himself), including:

- 1942: Strictly in the Groove
- 1942: Riding Through Nevada
- 1943: Frontier Fury
- 1944: Cyclone Prairie Rangers
- 1947: Louisiana
- 1949: Mississippi Rhythm
- 1950: Square Dance Katy

== See also ==
- List of governors of Louisiana
- Jim Flynn, a writer encouraged when Davis signed his first song writing contract
- List of centenarians (actors, filmmakers and entertainers)

== Sources ==
- Toru Mitsui (1998). "Jimmie Davis." In The Encyclopedia of Country Music. Paul Kingsbury, Ed. New York: Oxford University Press. p. 136.
- Kevin S. Fontenot, "You Can't Fight a Song: Country Music in Jimmie Davis' Gubernatorial Campaigns," Journal of Country Music (2007).

Party political offices
Preceded by Sam H. Jones	Democratic nominee for Governor of Louisiana; 1944	Succeeded by Earl Long
Preceded by Earl Long	Democratic nominee for Governor of Louisiana; 1960	Succeeded by John McKeithen
Political offices
Preceded by Sam H. Jones	Governor of Louisiana; May 9, 1944–May 11, 1948	Succeeded by Earl K. Long
Preceded by Earl K. Long	Governor of Louisiana; May 10, 1960–May 12, 1964	Succeeded by John McKeithen
Honorary titles
Preceded by J. Bracken Lee	Oldest living United States governor October 20, 1996 – November 5, 2000	Succeeded by Strom Thurmond
Preceded by Nellie Tayloe Ross	Oldest United States governor ever October 2, 2000 – March 17, 2011	Succeeded by Albert Rosellini
