= 1944 Louisiana gubernatorial election =

1944 Louisiana Democratic gubernatorial primary
- February 29, 1944
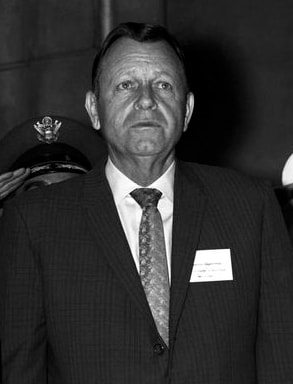

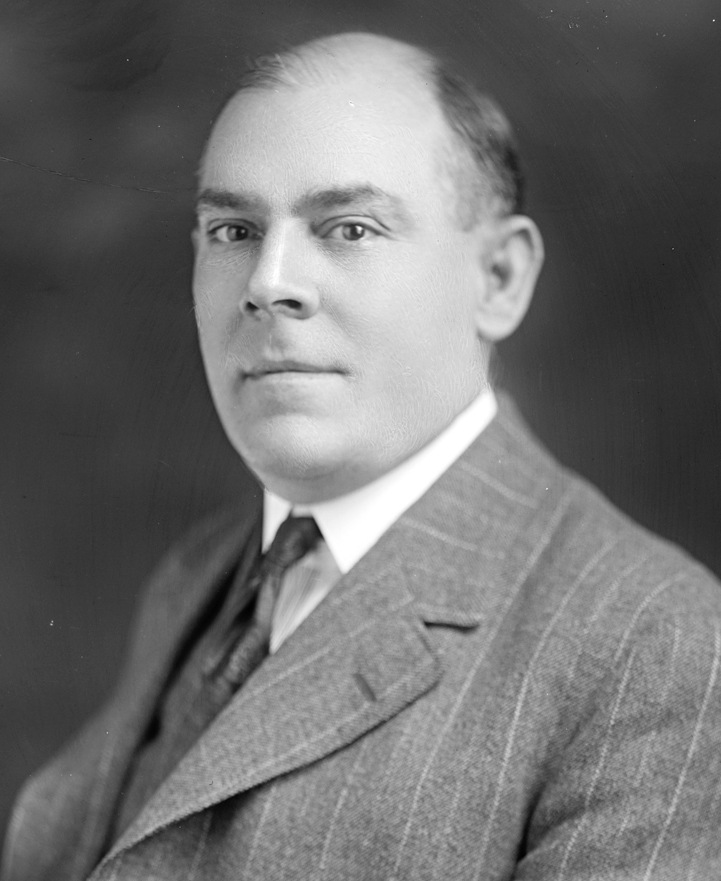
Nominee	Jimmie Davis	Lewis L. Morgan
Party	Democratic	Democratic
Alliance	Anti-Long	Longite
Popular vote	251,228	217,915
Percentage	53.55%	46.45%
- Parish results Davis: 50–60% 60–70% 70–80% Morgan: 50–60% 60–70% 70–80%
Governor before election
Sam H. Jones
Democratic
Elected Governor
Jimmie Davis
Democratic

The 1944 Louisiana gubernatorial election was held in two rounds on January 18 and February 29, 1944. Like most Southern states between the Reconstruction Era and the Civil Rights Movement, Louisiana's Republican Party was virtually nonexistent in terms of electoral support. This meant that the two Democratic Party primaries held on these dates were the real contest over who would be governor. The 1944 election saw the reformer ‘anti-Long’ faction retain power for another four years under Jimmie Davis.

Louisiana's constitution did not allow incumbent governor Sam Jones to succeed himself in a consecutive term. Instead, the reformer forces endorsed Jimmie Davis, a country singer from Shreveport who was then serving as Public Service Commissioner. Davis campaigned on a theme of "Peace and Harmony", and punctuated his campaign stops with performances of "You Are My Sunshine."

Louisiana's Longite faction desired a return to power after being defeated in 1940. Huey Long's brother Earl had ambitions to return as governor, and began to prepare for a campaign. But Long failed to gain the support of New Orleans mayor Robert Maestri, whose Old Regular machine was seen as an essential component of any victorious Longite candidate. Instead, Maestri threw his support behind Lewis L. Morgan, an elderly politician from Covington whose unexciting campaign found little resonance with voters. Long had to satisfy himself with running for Lieutenant Governor on Morgan's ticket.

Other candidates included Jimmy Morrison, Dudley J. LeBlanc, and Sam Caldwell. Coming amid the grim mood of wartime, the 1944 campaign was widely seen as one of the quietest in years.

== Democratic primary ==
=== Candidates ===
- Sam Caldwell, mayor of Shreveport
- Ernest S. Clements, State Senator from Oberlin
- Jimmie Davis, Louisiana Public Service Commission and country music singer
- Lee Lanier
- Dudley J. LeBlanc, State Senator from Acadia Parish
- Lewis L. Morgan, former U.S. Representative from Covington
- James H. Morrison, U.S. Representative from Hammond and candidate for governor in 1940
- Vincent Moseley

=== Results ===
1944 Democratic gubernatorial primary
Party	Candidate	Votes	%
Democratic	Jimmie Davis	167,434	34.93%
Democratic	Lewis L. Morgan	131,682	27.47%
Democratic	James H. Morrison	76,081	15.87%
Democratic	Dudley J. LeBlanc	40,392	8.43%
Democratic	Sam Caldwell	34,335	7.16%
Democratic	Ernest Clements	20,404	4.26%
Democratic	Vincent Moseley	7,385	1.54%
Democratic	Lee Lanier	1,641	0.34%
Total votes		479,354	100.00%

LeBlanc and Morrison each won a handful of parishes in their respective bases in south Louisiana. Morgan did poorly in much of the state aside from the Long stronghold of Winn Parish and the surrounding area, but the number of votes turned out for him by the Old Regulars in New Orleans propelled him into the runoff. But Davis's popularity in north Louisiana and throughout the state's rural parishes gave him a strong lead.

=== Runoff ===
1944 Democratic gubernatorial runoff
Party	Candidate	Votes	%	±%
Democratic	Jimmie H. Davis	251,228	53.55%	▲18.62
Democratic	Lewis L. Morgan	217,915	46.45%	▲18.98
Total votes		469,243	100.00%	

In the runoff, Morgan maintained much of his support, but the candidates split the vote of candidates defeated in the first primary. Davis therefore maintained his margin from the primary, winning with a comfortable majority.
