= 1912 Louisiana gubernatorial election =

- April 16, 1912
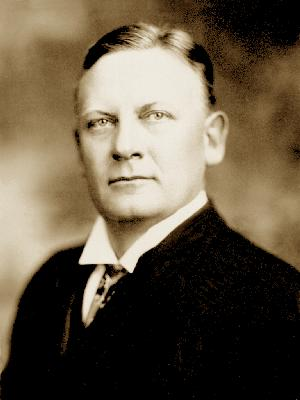

Candidate	Luther E. Hall	John Michel
Party	Democratic	Republican
Popular vote	50,581	4,961
Percentage	89.48%	8.78%
- Parish Results; Hall: 50–60% 60–70% 70–80% 80–90% 90–100% Tie: 50% No Data/Vote
Governor before election
Jared Y. Sanders, Sr.
Democratic
Elected Governor
Luther E. Hall
Democratic

The 1912 Louisiana gubernatorial election was held on April 16, 1912. Like most Southern states between Reconstruction and the civil rights era, Louisiana's Republican Party had almost no electoral support. This meant that the Democratic Party primary held on January 23 was the real contest over who would be governor. The election resulted in the election of Democrat Luther E. Hall as governor of Louisiana.

== Results ==
Democratic Party Primary, January 23

Candidate	Votes received	Percent
Luther E. Hall	53,407	43.28%
John T. Michel	46,201	37.44%
James B. Aswell	23,800	19.29%

Runoff not held due to Michel withdrawing

Republican Party Primary, January 23

Candidate	Votes received	Percent
Hugh S. Suthon	1,013	62.53%
Charles J. Bell	607	37.47%

General Election, April 16

Party	Candidate	Votes received	Percent
Democratic	Luther E. Hall	50,581	89.48%
Republican	Hugh S. Suthon	4,961	8.78%
Independent	J.R Jones	984	1.74%

Preceded by 1908 gubernatorial election	Louisiana gubernatorial elections	Succeeded by 1916 gubernatorial election
