= John K. Griffith =

American politician

John Keller Griffith
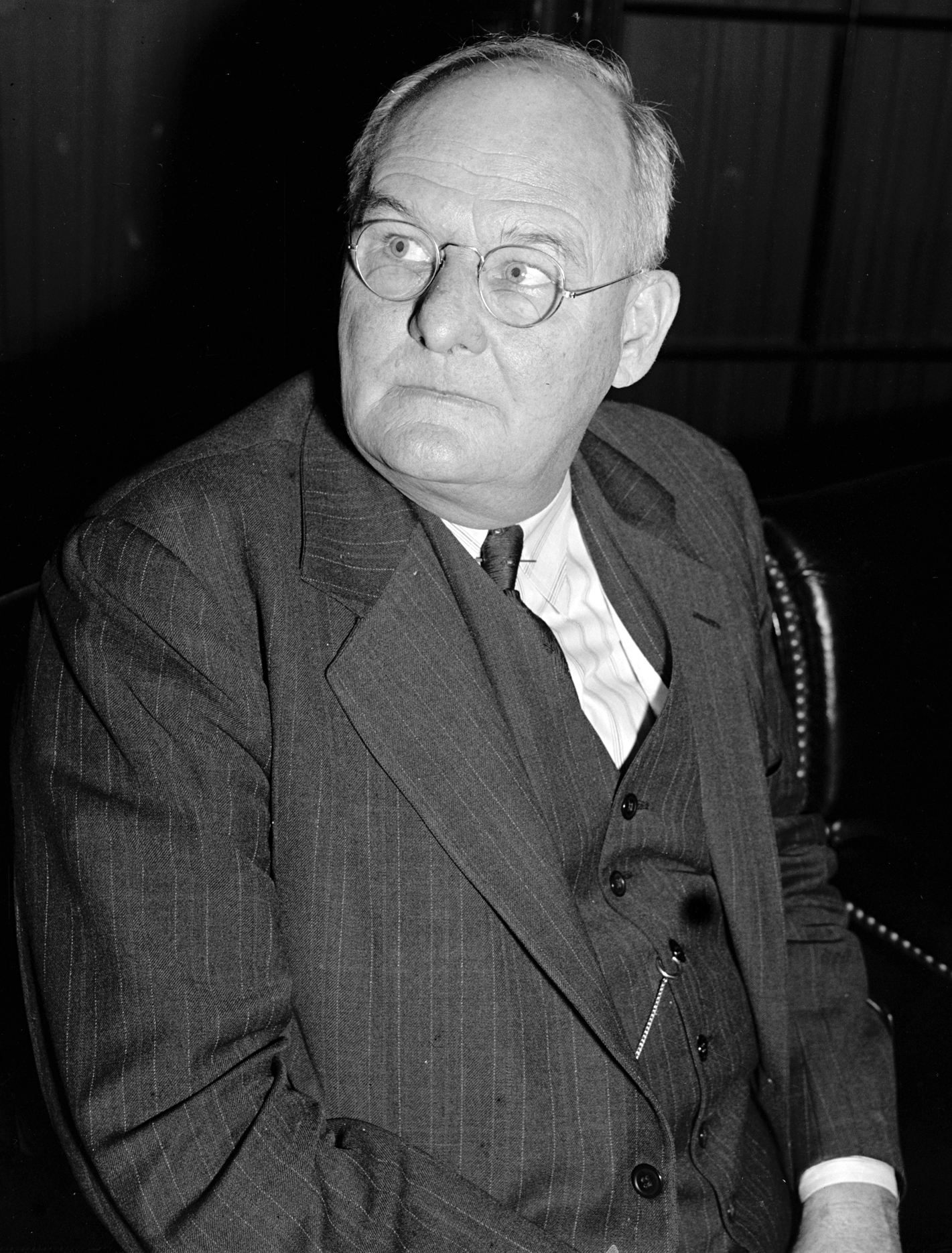

Member of the U.S. House of Representatives from Louisiana's 6th district
- In office January 3, 1937 – January 3, 1941
- Preceded by: Jared Y. Sanders Jr.
- Succeeded by: Jared Y. Sanders Jr.

Personal details
- Born: October 16, 1882 Baton Rouge, Louisiana
- Died: September 25, 1942 (aged 59) Slidell, Louisiana
- Party: Democratic
- Education: Louisiana State University; Tulane University Medical School
- Occupation: Physician

John Keller Griffith (October 16, 1882 – September 25, 1942) was a member of the United States House of Representatives from Louisiana's 6th congressional district.

Born in Baton Rouge, he earned a college degree from Louisiana State University and then his Doctor of Medicine degree from Tulane University in New Orleans. He served in the United States Army Medical Corps during World War I. He worked for a physician at the insane asylum in Jackson, Louisiana.

In 1936, Griffith was elected as a Democrat to the first of two terms in Congress, having unseated Jared Y. Sanders, Jr., of Baton Rouge in the primary. However, he was defeated by Sanders in 1940 in a renomination bid for a third term. He died shortly after Sanders himself was unseated in District 6 by the long-term Representative James H. Morrison of Hammond, Louisiana.

U.S. House of Representatives
Preceded by Jared Y. Sanders Jr.	Member of the U.S. House of Representatives from Louisiana's 6th congressional district 1937–1941	Succeeded by Jared Y. Sanders Jr.
