= Samuel M. Robertson =

American politician (1852–1911)

Samuel Matthews Robertson
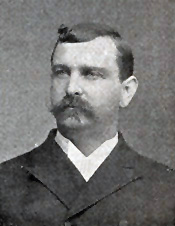

Member of the U.S. House of Representatives from Louisiana's 6th district
- In office December 5, 1887 – March 3, 1907
- Preceded by: Edward W. Robertson
- Succeeded by: George K. Favrot

Personal details
- Born: January 1, 1852 Plaquemine, Iberville Parish, Louisiana
- Died: December 24, 1911 (aged 59) Baton Rouge, Louisiana
- Party: Democratic
- Education: Magruder's Collegiate Institute, Louisiana State University
- Alma mater: Louisiana State University
- Occupation: Attorney, Politician
- Profession: Lawyer
- Committees: Chairman, Committee on Levees and Improvements of the Mississippi River (Fifty-second Congress)

Samuel Matthews Robertson (January 1, 1852 – December 24, 1911) was a U.S. representative from Louisiana, son of Edward White Robertson.

Born in Plaquemine, Iberville Parish, Louisiana, Robertson attended Magruder's Collegiate Institute, Baton Rouge, Louisiana, and studied law at Louisiana State University, graduating in 1874. He was admitted to the bar the same year and commenced practice in Baton Rouge, Louisiana.

Robertson was elected a member of the State house of representatives in 1879. He served as member of the LSU faculty in 1880.

Robertson was elected as a Democrat to the Fiftieth Congress to fill the vacancy caused by the death of his father, Edward White Robertson. He was reelected to the Fifty-first and to the eight succeeding Congresses, serving from December 5, 1887, to March 3, 1907.

He served as chairman of the Committee on Levees and Improvements of the Mississippi River (Fifty-second Congress). He was an unsuccessful candidate for renomination in 1906, and resumed the practice of law in Baton Rouge. He was superintendent of the Louisiana School for the Deaf and Dumb from 1908 to 1911, and died in Baton Rouge, Louisiana, December 24, 1911. He was interred in Magnolia Cemetery.

U.S. House of Representatives
Preceded by Edward W. Robertson	Member of the U.S. House of Representatives from Louisiana's 6th congressional district 1887–1907	Succeeded by George K. Favrot
