= George K. Favrot =

American politician

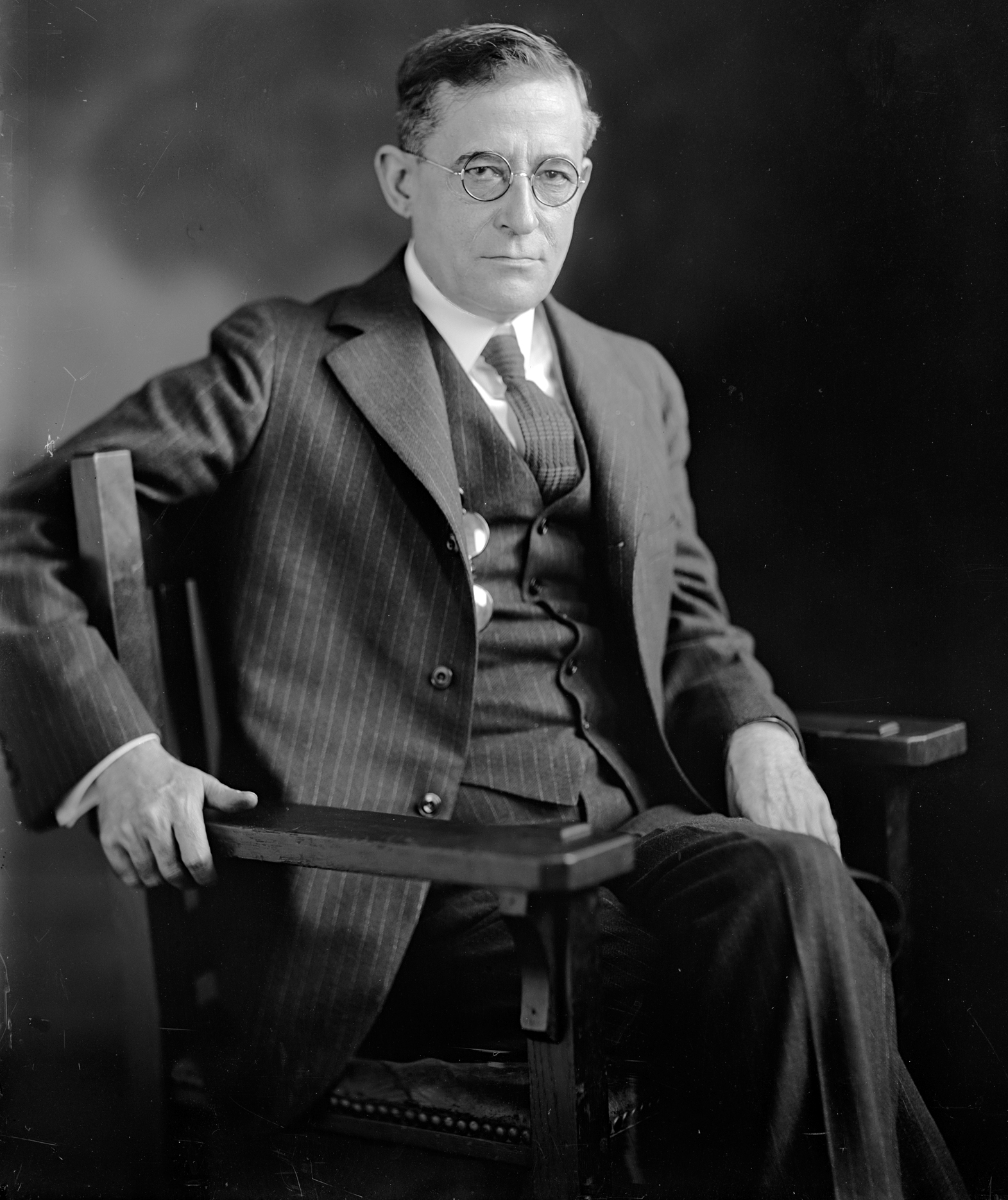

Member of the U.S. House of Representatives from Louisiana's 6th district
- In office March 4, 1907 – March 3, 1909
- Preceded by: Samuel Matthews Robertson
- Succeeded by: Robert Charles Wickliffe
- In office March 4, 1921 – March 3, 1925
- Preceded by: Jared Young Sanders
- Succeeded by: Bolivar E. Kemp

Member of the Louisiana House of Representatives
- In office 1912-1916

Personal details
- Born: November 26, 1868 Baton Rouge, Louisiana
- Died: December 26, 1934 (aged 66) Baton Rouge, Louisiana
- Party: Democratic

George Kent Favrot (November 26, 1868 – December 26, 1934) was a U.S. representative from Louisiana.

Born in Baton Rouge, East Baton Rouge Parish, Louisiana, Favrot attended the public schools and was graduated from Louisiana State University at Baton Rouge in 1888 and from the law department of Tulane University, New Orleans, Louisiana, in 1890. He was admitted to the bar in 1890 and commenced practice in Baton Rouge, Louisiana. He served as district attorney of the twenty-second judicial district of Louisiana 1892–1896. He was an unsuccessful candidate for reelection in 1896. He served as delegate at large to the State constitutional convention in 1898. He again served as district attorney 1900–1904. He served as district judge 1904–1906.

Favrot was elected as a Democrat to the Sixtieth Congress (March 4, 1907 – March 3, 1909). He was an unsuccessful candidate for renomination in 1908. He served as member of the State house of representatives 1912–1916. He resumed the practice of law in Baton Rouge.

Favrot was elected to the Sixty-seventh and Sixty-eighth Congresses (March 4, 1921 – March 3, 1925). He was an unsuccessful candidate for reelection in 1924 to the Sixty-ninth Congress. He returned to the practice of law in Baton Rouge.

Favrot was elected judge of division B of the nineteenth judicial district court in 1926 and served until his death in Baton Rouge December 26, 1934. He was interred in Roselawn Memorial Park.

== Killing of Dr. R. H. Aldrich ==
On the evening of November 6, 1906, in Baton Rouge, George K. Favrot fatally shot Dr. Robert H. Aldrich, who had been a "lifelong friend". Dr. Aldrich had purportedly slandered Favrot's wife at a party to celebrate Favrot's election to Congress. Favrot ambushed his quarry as the doctor was entering the lobby of the Raymond Building, where Dr. Aldrich maintained his offices. Favrot fired three shots, killing Dr. Aldrich.

Favrot turned himself in to his friends Deputy Sheriff Milligan and his running-mate and current District Attorney Hubert Wax. Favrot was placed in jail for five months while two separate Grand Juries debated the charges against him, however, he was released after both Grand Juries refused to indict. He was being represented by his friend and fellow Judge Thomas J. Kernan. His defense was purported to be based on an ‘unwritten law’ about the slandering of one's wife and had been presented by his lawyer at the last annual meeting of the American Bar Association, who argued in favor of recognition of this ‘principle’. While Favrot served five months in jail awaiting the Grand Jury's determination, Congress kept his seat open.

U.S. House of Representatives
| Preceded by Samuel M. Robertson | Member of the U.S. House of Representatives from Louisiana's 6th congressional district 1907-1909 | Succeeded by Robert C. Wickliffe |
| Preceded by Jared Y. Sanders, Sr. | Member of the U.S. House of Representatives from Louisiana's 6th congressional district 1921–1925 | Succeeded by Bolivar E. Kemp |
