= Edward T. Lewis (politician) =

American politician

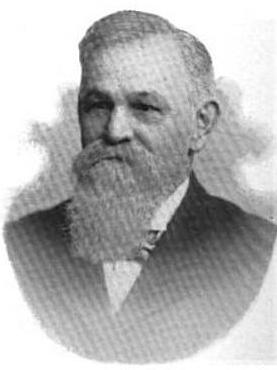

Member of the U.S. House of Representatives from Louisiana's 6th district
- In office March 4, 1883 – March 3, 1885
- Preceded by: Edward White Robertson
- Succeeded by: Alfred Briggs Irion

Member of the Louisiana House of Representatives
- In office 1865–1867; 1886–1888

Personal details
- Born: Edward Taylor Lewis; October 26, 1834 Opelousas, Louisiana, US
- Died: April 26, 1927 (aged 92) Opelousas, Louisiana
- Party: Democratic
- Education: Wesleyan University
- Occupation: Attorney

Military service
- Allegiance: Confederate States
- Branch/service: Confederate States Army
- Rank: Captain
- Unit: 2nd Louisiana Cavalry
- Battles/wars: American Civil War

Edward Taylor Lewis (October 26, 1834 – April 26, 1927) was an American lawyer and Confederate veteran of the Civil War who served as a member of the United States House of Representatives from Louisiana for one term from 1883 to 1885.

== Life and career ==
Lewis was born on October 26, 1834, in Opelousas, Louisiana.

He attended Wesleyan University of Ohio, earning a law degree, and returning to his home state to work as an attorney.

During the American Civil War, he was a Captain in Company G, 2nd Louisiana Cavalry. After the war and Louisiana's Reconstruction, he served one term in the Louisiana House of Representatives from 1865 to 1867.

=== Congress ===
In 1883, he was elected to Congress, serving one term as a Democrat before an unsuccessful renomination bid. From 1886 to 1892, he again was a member of the state House of Representatives, and he worked at various judgeships between 1886 and 1908.

=== Later career and death ===
He then resumed the practice of law, and died at the age of 92 on April 26, 1927, in Opelousas.

U.S. House of Representatives
Preceded by Edward White Robertson	Member of the U.S. House of Representatives from Louisiana's 6th congressional district 1883–1885	Succeeded by Alfred Briggs Irion
