= Charles E. Nash =

American politician (1844–1913)

Charles Edmund Nash
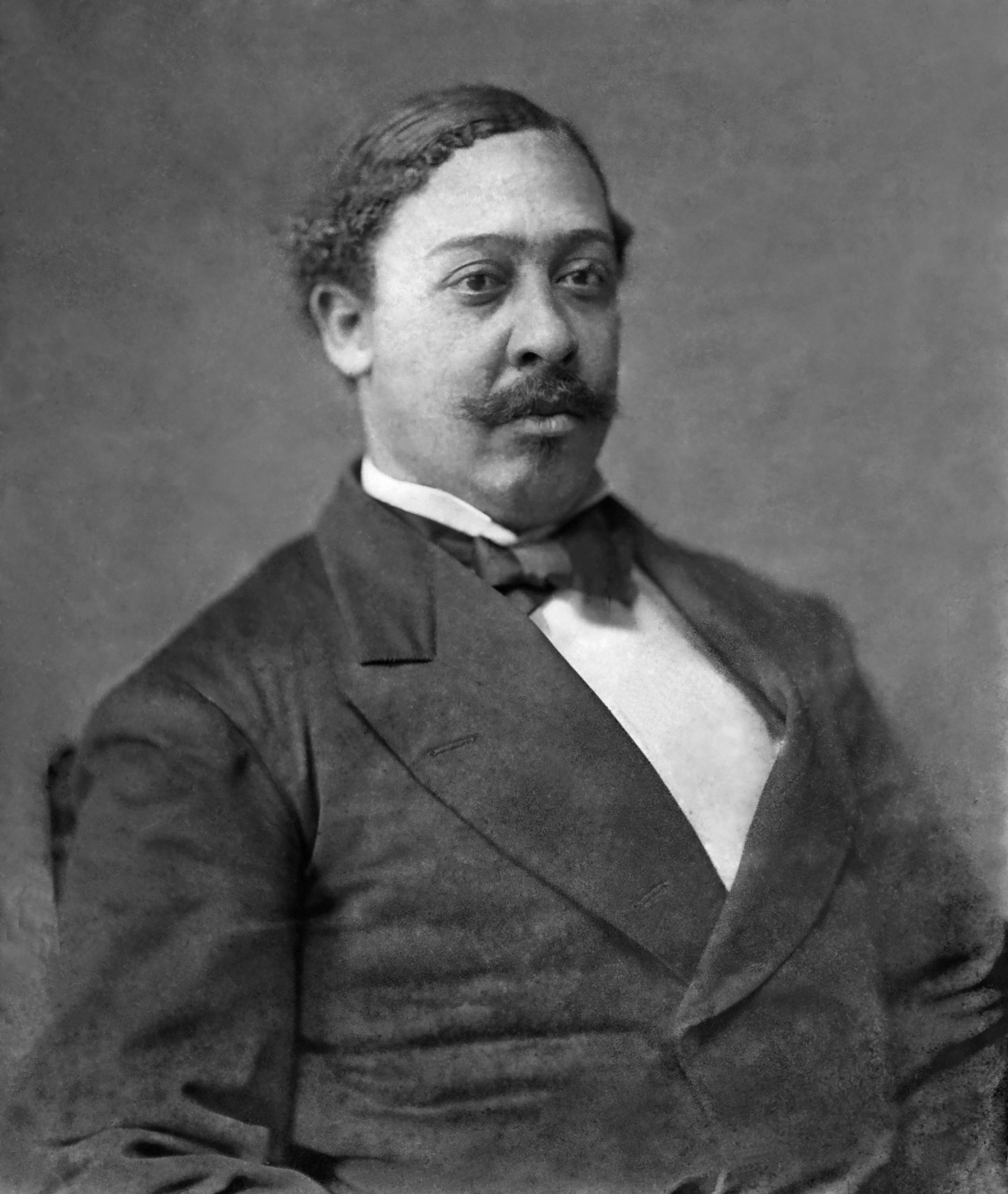
- Portrait by Brady c. 1875–1877

Member of the U.S. House of Representatives from Louisiana's 6th district
- In office March 4, 1875 – March 3, 1877
- Preceded by: District established
- Succeeded by: Edward White Robertson

Personal details
- Born: May 23, 1844 Opelousas, Louisiana, U.S.
- Died: June 21, 1913 (aged 69) New Orleans, Louisiana, U.S.
- Party: Republican

Military service
- Allegiance: United States
- Branch/service: Union Army
- Years of service: 1863–1865
- Rank: Sergeant major
- Unit: 82nd Regiment, U.S. Volunteers
- Battles/wars: American Civil War; Battle of Fort Blakeley (WIA)

Charles Edmund Nash (May 23, 1844 – June 21, 1913) was an American politician who served a single two-year term as Republican in the United States House of Representatives from Louisiana.

He was Louisiana's first African-American to serve as congressman; John Willis Menard was elected to the U.S. Senate in 1868 and P. B. S. Pinchback was elected to the U. S. Senate in 1872, but neither one served. Nash would remain the state's only black U.S. Representative for more than a century — until 1991, when William J. Jefferson's tenure in the 2nd Louisiana District began.

== Early life and education ==
Nash was born in Opelousas (the seat of St. Landry Parish) in southern Louisiana. He attended the common schools and was a bricklayer by trade.

== Career ==
During the American Civil War, he enlisted in 1863 as a private in the Eighty-second Regiment, United States Volunteers, and was promoted to the rank of sergeant major. (This regiment is listed in the U.S. Colored Troops in the Mobile Campaign Union order of battle.) Nash was severely wounded near the end of the war, at the Battle of Fort Blakeley in Alabama, April 1865; he lost part of his leg.

After the war Nash was a businessman and was appointed night inspector of U.S. customs.

Nash was elected as a Republican to the Forty-fourth Congress (March 4, 1875 – March 3, 1877). He was unsuccessful as a candidate for reelection in 1876, as "Redeemer" Democrats regained control of Louisianan politics. He served briefly as postmaster at Washington in St. Landry Parish, Louisiana, during the Chester A. Arthur administration, only from February 15 to May 1, 1882.

== Later life and death ==
Nash died in New Orleans at the age of sixty-nine. He was interred there in Saint Louis Cemetery No. 3.

== See also ==
- List of African-American United States representatives

U.S. House of Representatives
Preceded by District created	Member of the U.S. House of Representatives from Louisiana's 6th congressional district 1875–1877	Succeeded by Edward White Robertson
