= Luther E. Hall =

American politician

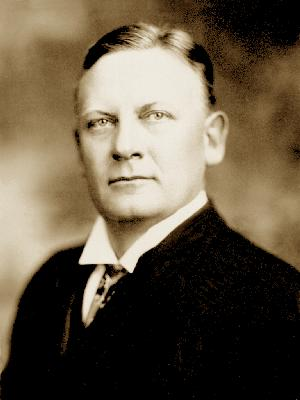

35th Governor of Louisiana
- In office May 14, 1912 – May 9, 1916
- Lieutenant: Thomas C. Barret
- Preceded by: Jared Y. Sanders
- Succeeded by: Ruffin G. Pleasant

Member of the Louisiana Senate
- In office 1898-1900

Personal details
- Born: August 30, 1869 Bastrop, Louisiana
- Died: November 6, 1921 (aged 52) New Orleans, Louisiana
- Resting place: Bastrop City Cemetery
- Party: Democratic
- Spouse: Julia Clara Wendel
- Education: Tulane University
- Occupation: Lawyer

Luther Egbert Hall (August 30, 1869 – November 6, 1921) was the 35th governor of Louisiana from 1912 to 1916. Prior to that, he was a state senator from 1898 to 1900, a state district judge from 1900 to 1906, and state appellate judge from 1906 to 1911. Before his death, he was assistant attorney general from 1918 to 1921. He built the historic Gov. Luther Hall House in Monroe, Louisiana in 1906.

== Career ==
He was elected to the Louisiana Supreme Court in 1912, but was then elected governor before taking his seat on the court. In becoming governor, he defeated James B. Aswell, the former president of Northwestern State University (then the Louisiana State Normal College) in Natchitoches in the Democratic primary.

A political progressive, Hall presided over numerous reforms during his time as governor such as a commission council form of government for New Orleans and various measures aimed at helping working people.

== Death ==
Hall died on November 6, 1921, of a heart attack while campaigning for a seat on the Louisiana Supreme Court. He is interred at Bastrop City Cemetery in Bastrop.

Party political offices
| Preceded by Jared Y. Sanders Sr. | Democratic nominee for Governor of Louisiana; 1912 | Succeeded by Ruffin G. Pleasant |
Political offices
| Preceded by Jared Y. Sanders | Governor of Louisiana; 1912–1916 | Succeeded by Ruffin G. Pleasant |
