= Jared Y. Sanders Jr. =

American politician (1892–1960)

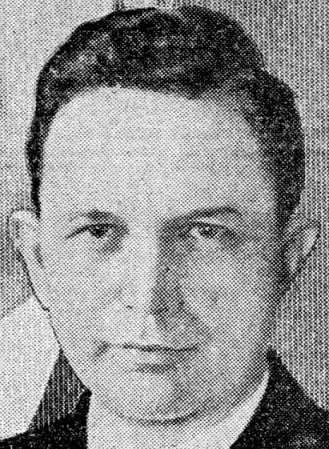
- Fort Worth Star-Telegram, January 9, 1934

Member of the U.S. House of Representatives from Louisiana's 6th district
- In office May 1, 1934 – January 3, 1937
- Preceded by: Bolivar E. Kemp
- Succeeded by: John K. Griffith
- In office January 3, 1941 – January 3, 1943
- Preceded by: John K. Griffith
- Succeeded by: James H. Morrison

Personal details
- Born: April 20, 1892 Franklin, Louisiana
- Died: November 29, 1960 (aged 68) Baton Rouge, Louisiana
- Resting place: Roselawn Memorial Park
- Party: Democratic
- Relatives: Jared Y. Sanders Sr.
- Education: Louisiana State University; Tulane University School of Law
- Occupation: Attorney

Jared Young Sanders Jr. (April 20, 1892 - November 29, 1960) was an American lawyer and politician who served three terms in the U.S. House of Representatives from 1934 to 1937 and again from 1941 to 1943. He was the son of Louisiana governor Jared Y. Sanders.

== Early life and career ==
Sanders was born in Franklin, Louisiana and attended Dixon Academy in Louisiana and Washington and Lee University in Lexington, Virginia before graduating from Louisiana State University in 1912. He later matriculated at the Tulane University School of Law, from which he graduated in 1914. He passed the bar that same year and began a private legal practice in Baton Rouge.

=== World War I ===
After America entered World War I Sanders served in the United States Army from May 1917 to April 1919. He was a captain for the Three Hundred and Forty-sixth Infantry, Eighty-seventh Division. After the war, he returned home to Louisiana.

=== Louisiana politics ===
He was elected as a Democrat to the Louisiana House of Representatives and served there from 1928 to 1932, when he was elected to the Louisiana Senate. During his time in the state legislature, Sanders gained a reputation as a leading opponent to the policies of Louisiana’s powerful political leader Huey Long.

== Congress ==
Upon the death of incumbent U.S. Congressman Bolivar E. Kemp a special election was held on December 5, 1933, with Kemp's wife Lallie Kemp winning uncontested. The legality of the election was disputed, as Louisiana state law required a 10 day notice period for any special election which had not been followed, and an unofficial election was held by citizens of the district which Sanders won. The House of Representatives annulled the election on January 29, 1934.

Sanders won the subsequent special election to the U.S. House without contest and took his seat on May 1, 1934. Representing Louisiana’s Sixth Congressional District, he was re-elected in the 1934 general election. In 1936, he was defeated in the Democratic primary by John K. Griffith. Sanders returned to the practice of law but remained active in politics, serving as a delegate at the Democratic National Conventions in 1940 and 1944.

In 1940, Sanders ran again for the 6th District House seat, serving one additional term from 1941 to 1943. In 1942, was again defeated in the Democratic primary, this time by James H. Morrison, and returned to private law practice in Baton Rouge.

== Death ==
Jared Y. Sanders Jr. died in Baton Rouge on November 29, 1960. He is interred at Roselawn Memorial Park.

Political offices
U.S. House of Representatives
Preceded by Bolivar E. Kemp	Member of the U.S. House of Representatives from Louisiana's 6th congressional district 1934–1937	Succeeded by John K. Griffith
Preceded by John K. Griffith	Member of the U.S. House of Representatives from Louisiana's 6th congressional district 1941–1943	Succeeded by James H. Morrison
