= Gov. Luther Hall House =

- U.S. National Register of Historic Places
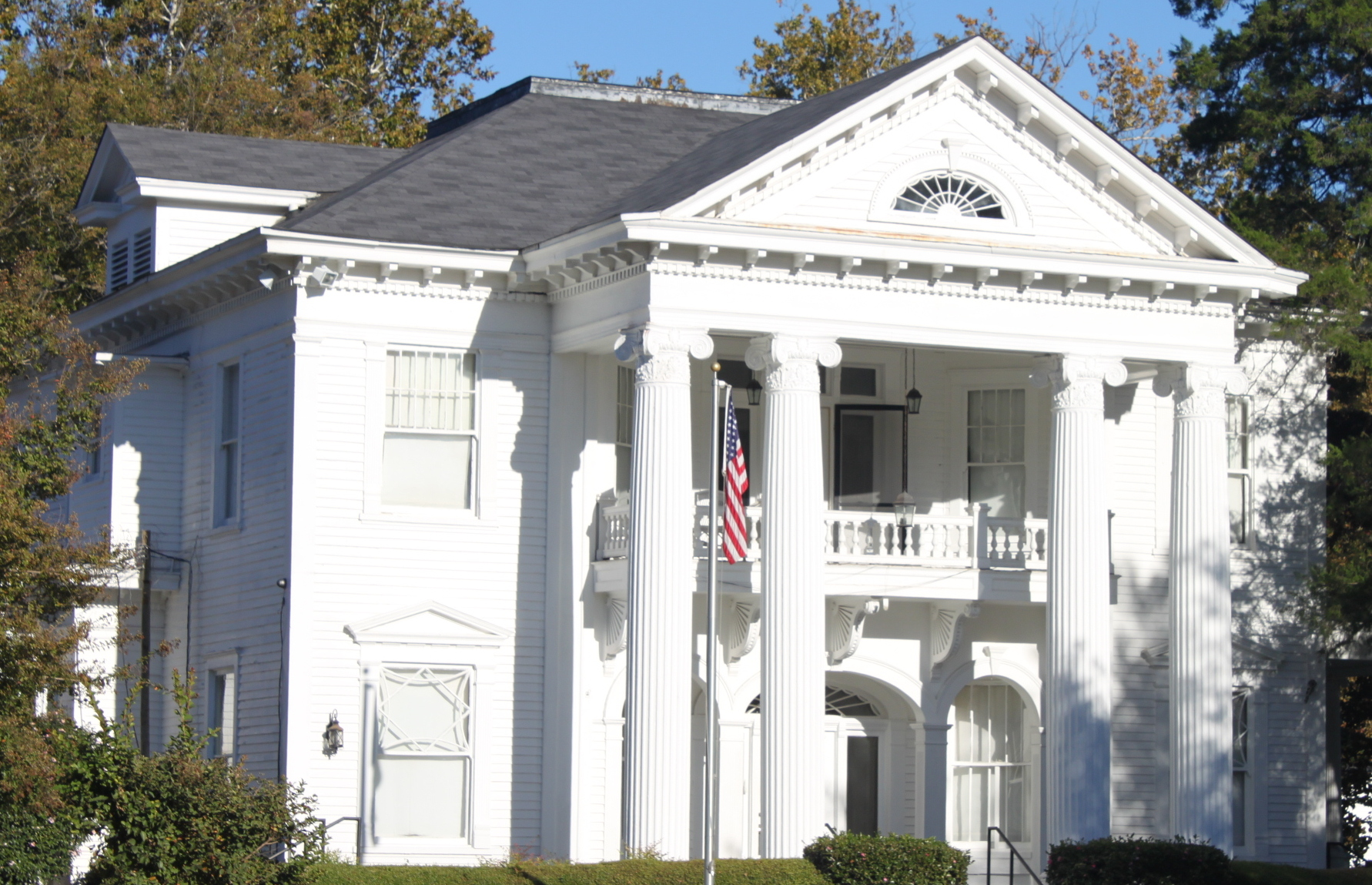
- Governor Luther Hall House in 2014

- Location within Louisiana
- Location: 1515 Jackson St., Monroe, Louisiana
- Coordinates: 32°29′24″N 92°06′36″W
- Area: 0.5 acres (0.20 ha)
- Built: 1906
- Architects: Hall, Luther E.
- Architectural style: Colonial Revival, Queen Anne, Neo-Georgian Revival
- NRHP reference No.: 79001079
- Added to NRHP: May 7, 1979

The Governor Luther Hall House is a historic residence at 1515 Jackson Street in Monroe, Louisiana. Built in 1906 for Luther E. Hall, who later served as the 35th Governor of Louisiana, the house is an example of early 20th-century residential architecture combining elements of Colonial Revival and Queen Anne styles.

The property is associated with Hall’s legal and political career in north Louisiana and reflects the development of Monroe during the early 20th century. It was listed on the National Register of Historic Places in 1979 and is now used as offices for a nonprofit organization.

== History ==
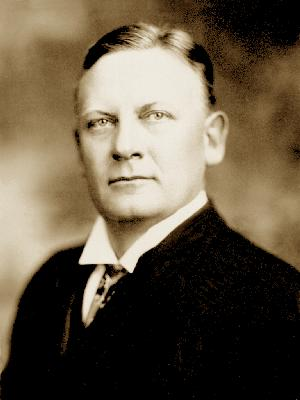
Governor Luther Hall

The house was constructed in 1906 for Luther E. Hall, who had recently relocated to Monroe as his legal and judicial career developed in north Louisiana. At the time, Monroe was expanding as a regional commercial and transportation center, and prominent professionals such as Hall established residences reflecting their status in the community.

Hall, who served as an appellate judge prior to his election as governor, lived in the house with his family until his inauguration in 1912 as the 35th governor of Louisiana. His occupancy of the residence coincided with his rise in state politics.

Following Hall’s tenure and departure from the property, the house passed through several owners. In 1946, it was acquired by the Young Women’s Christian Association of Monroe, reflecting a shift from private residential use to institutional use.

The building has continued to serve community-oriented purposes and is now used as the administrative offices of The Wellspring, a nonprofit organization providing social services in northeast Louisiana.

== Significance ==
The Governor Luther Hall House is significant for its association with Luther E. Hall, a prominent figure in Louisiana’s legal and political history who served as governor from 1912 to 1916. The residence reflects his career during a period of professional advancement prior to his election to statewide office.

Architecturally, the house represents an example of early 20th-century residential design that blends elements of Colonial Revival and Queen Anne styles. This combination of stylistic features illustrates the eclectic architectural trends common in Louisiana during the period.

The property also reflects the residential development of Monroe in the early 1900s, when the city was emerging as an important regional center. Its later adaptation for institutional use demonstrates the continued viability of historic residences within changing urban contexts.

The house was listed on the National Register of Historic Places on May 7, 1979.

== Architecture ==
The Governor Luther Hall House is an example of early 20th-century architectural eclecticism, combining elements of Georgian Revival and Queen Anne styles.

The front facade features four Ionic wooden columns supporting an entablature with decorative medallions. A central entrance is recessed behind a series of arches and is topped by an elliptical fanlight, with sidelights extending downward to paneled bases. Curved windows and pilasters frame the openings, while pedimented entablatures accent the lower-floor windows.

The roofline is defined by a truncated pyramidal form with pedimented elements and louvered dormers. One-story projecting bays extend from the main structure, contributing to the building’s symmetry and massing.

Additional features include bracketed eaves, detailed cornices, and a side porch supported by smaller Ionic columns, reflecting both classical and decorative influences typical of the period.
