= 1940 Louisiana gubernatorial election =

1940 Louisiana Democratic gubernatorial primary
- February 20, 1940
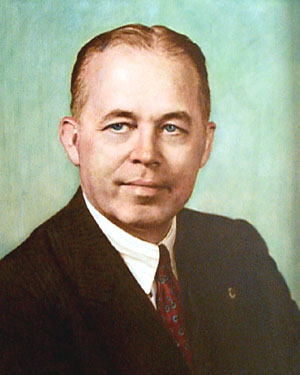

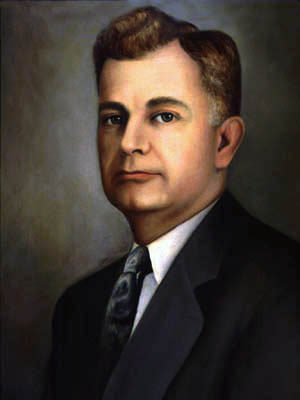
Candidate	Sam H. Jones	Earl Long
Party	Democratic	Democratic
Alliance	Anti-Long	Longite
Popular vote	284,437	265,403
Percentage	51.73%	48.27%
- Parish results Jones: 50–60% 60–70% Long: 50–60% 60–70% 80–90%
Governor before election
Earl K. Long
Democratic
Elected Governor
Sam H. Jones
Democratic

The 1940 Louisiana gubernatorial election was held in two rounds on January 16 and February 20, 1940. Like most Southern states between the Reconstruction Era and the Civil Rights Movement, Louisiana's Republican Party was virtually nonexistent in terms of electoral support. This meant that the two Democratic Party primaries held on these dates were the real contest over who would be governor. The election resulted in the narrow defeat of Earl K. Long and the election of Sam H. Jones as governor of Louisiana on a reform platform.

== Candidates ==
- Incumbent governor Earl K. Long had succeeded to the office in 1939 after the resignation of governor Richard W. Leche and was running for a full term. He was endorsed by the Louisiana Democratic Organization, which consisted of the machine created by his brother Huey Long as well as the powerful New Orleans Regular Democratic Organization.
- Lake Charles attorney Sam H. Jones was recruited as a candidate by the anti-Long forces, who were gaining in strength in the aftermath of the 'Louisiana Scandals' associated with Leche. He was endorsed by 'good government' groups, conservatives, and others opposed to the policies and actions of the Longs. He campaigned on a platform of good government, opening of state books to public inspection, a merit-based state civil service, and the abolition of Long's 'deduct' system and patronage appointments.
- State Senator James A. Noe ran as the "genuine Huey Long candidate" charging that Leche and Earl Long has betrayed the Long legacy with their corruption. His campaign was particularly popular among North Louisiana farmers and former supporters of Huey Long disillusioned with the corruption of his successors.
- Hammond attorney James H. Morrison had little support outside the Florida Parishes. He ran a humorous anti-Long campaign, with campaign stops featuring a 'convict parade' of men in prison stripes representing Long, Leche, and Robert Maestri. Morrison was thereafter a law partner of the pro-Long Joseph A. Sims of Hammond.
- New Orleans attorney Vincent Moseley had no organized political backing and was not generally seen as a serious candidate.

== Campaign ==
The focus of the campaign was the ongoing 'Louisiana Scandals' which implicated former governor Richard W. Leche – and by extension Earl K. Long – in widespread corruption. Jones's main campaign focus was a moralistic crusade against corruption, and the state's newspapers featured him in overwhelmingly positive coverage. Behind the scenes, though, Jones enlisted the aid of veteran politicos who were themselves implicated in questionable dealings. He refused to criticize Huey Long, saying that "I am not running against a dead man. I am running against a gang of rascals as live as any gang that ever lived, and I'm running to clean out every one of them." Jones also promised to expand some of the Long programs, including teacher salary increases and a new old-age pension.

Earl Long made use of the Louisiana Progress newspaper he had inherited from his brother, as well as state publications like the Louisiana Conservation Review. He also made extensive speaking tours throughout the state's rural areas, making colorful attacks on the big-city newspapers and calling Jones a tool of corporate interests.

Jones got most of his funding from wealthy 'good-government' supporters, while Long's funding came from state employee deductions, oil and gas companies, and contributions from organized crime.

After the first round of voting, Noe endorsed Jones after the two struck a deal in which the 'good-government' Jones promised Noe half of the state's patronage appointments in exchange for his support. Long called a special session of the legislature to pass several spending increases for social programs and some reform bills in an effort to influence runoff voters. But Long refused to include a pay raise for teachers, alienating a large voting bloc in the process.

== Results ==
First Democratic Party Primary, January 16

Candidate	Votes received	Percent
Earl K. Long	226,385	40.88%
Sam H. Jones	154,936	27.98%
James A. Noe	116,564	21.05%
James H. Morrison	48,243	8.71%
Vincent Moseley	7,595	1.37%

Second Democratic Party Primary, February 20

Candidate	Votes received	Percent
Sam H. Jones	284,437	51.73%
Earl K. Long	265,403	48.27%

Despite Long's promises of increased social programs, voters were still outraged over the recent corruption scandals and were unwilling to believe Earl Long's claims that he had had nothing to do with the scandals. Jones's victory ended twelve years of Longite governors in Louisiana.
