= Robert Charles Wickliffe =

American politician (1874–1912)

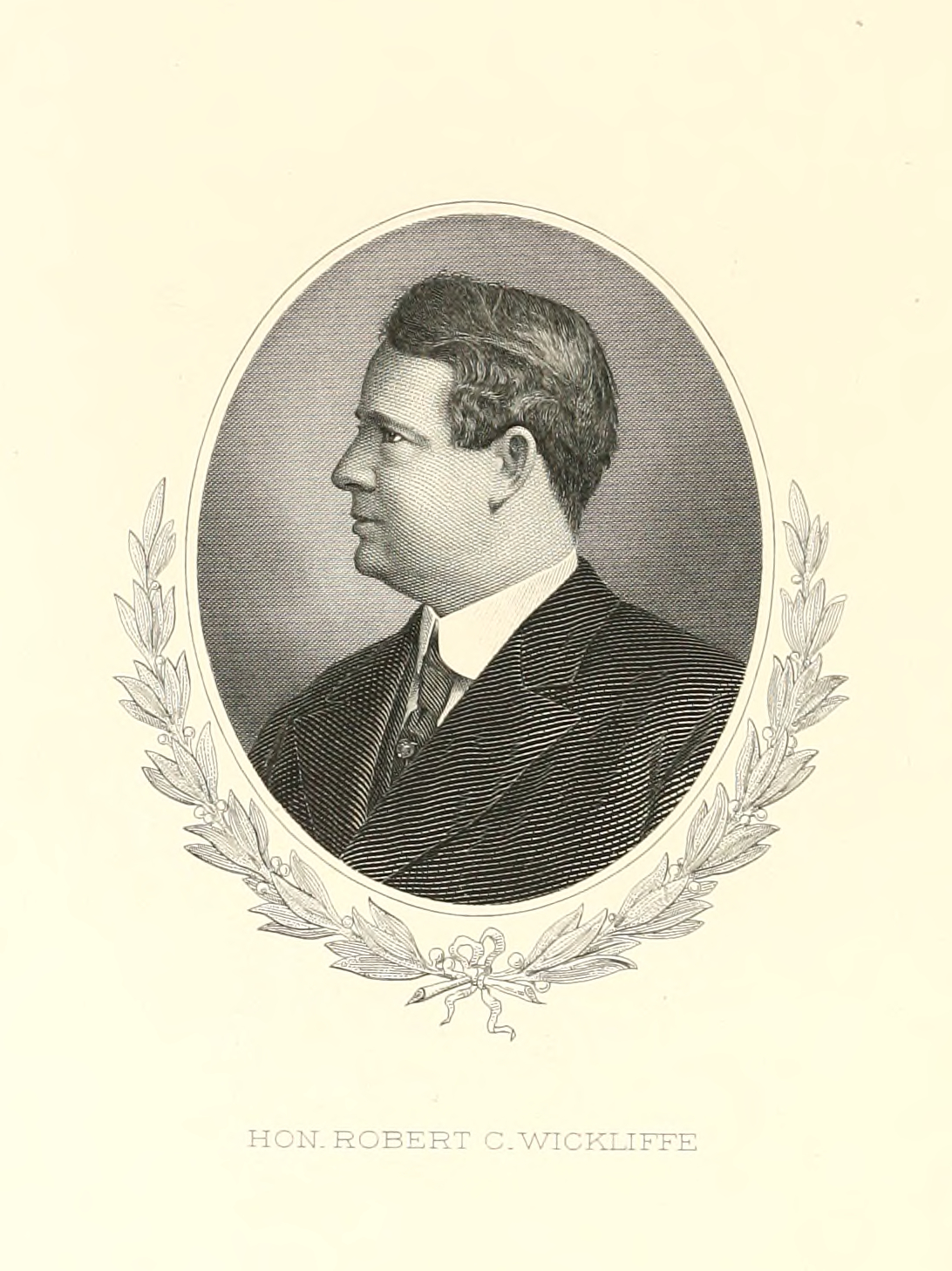

Member of the U.S. House of Representatives from Louisiana's 6th district
- In office March 4, 1909 – June 11, 1912
- Preceded by: George Kent Favrot
- Succeeded by: Lewis Lovering Morgan

Personal details
- Born: May 1, 1874 Bardstown, Kentucky, US
- Died: June 11, 1912 (aged 38) Washington, D.C., US
- Party: Democratic
- Relations: Charles A. Wickliffe (grandfather); Robert C. Wickliffe (father)
- Education: Centre College; Tulane University

Military service
- Branch/service: United States Army
- Years of service: 1898
- Battles/wars: Spanish–American War

Robert Charles Wickliffe (May 1, 1874 – June 11, 1912) was an American politician. He was a U.S. representative from Louisiana.

== Biography ==
Born in Bardstown, Kentucky, while his parents were visiting relatives; he attended the public schools of St. Francisville, Louisiana; was graduated from Centre College, Danville, Kentucky, in 1895 and from the law department of Tulane University, New Orleans, Louisiana in 1897; was admitted to the bar in 1898 and commenced practice in St. Francisville; member of the state constitutional convention in 1898; enlisted as a private in Company E, First Regiment, Louisiana Volunteer Infantry, during the Spanish–American War; was mustered out of the service in October 1898; returned to West Feliciana Parish; district attorney of the twenty-fourth judicial district of Louisiana 1902–1906; elected as a Democrat to the 61st and 62nd congresses, (March 4, 1909 – June 11, 1912), when he was killed while crossing a railroad bridge in Washington, D.C.; interment in Cave Hill Cemetery, Louisville, Kentucky.

== See also ==
- List of members of the United States Congress who died in office (1900–1949)

U.S. House of Representatives
Preceded by George K. Favrot	Member of the U.S. House of Representatives from Louisiana's 6th congressional district 1909–1912	Succeeded by Lewis L. Morgan
