= James Benjamin Aswell =

American politician

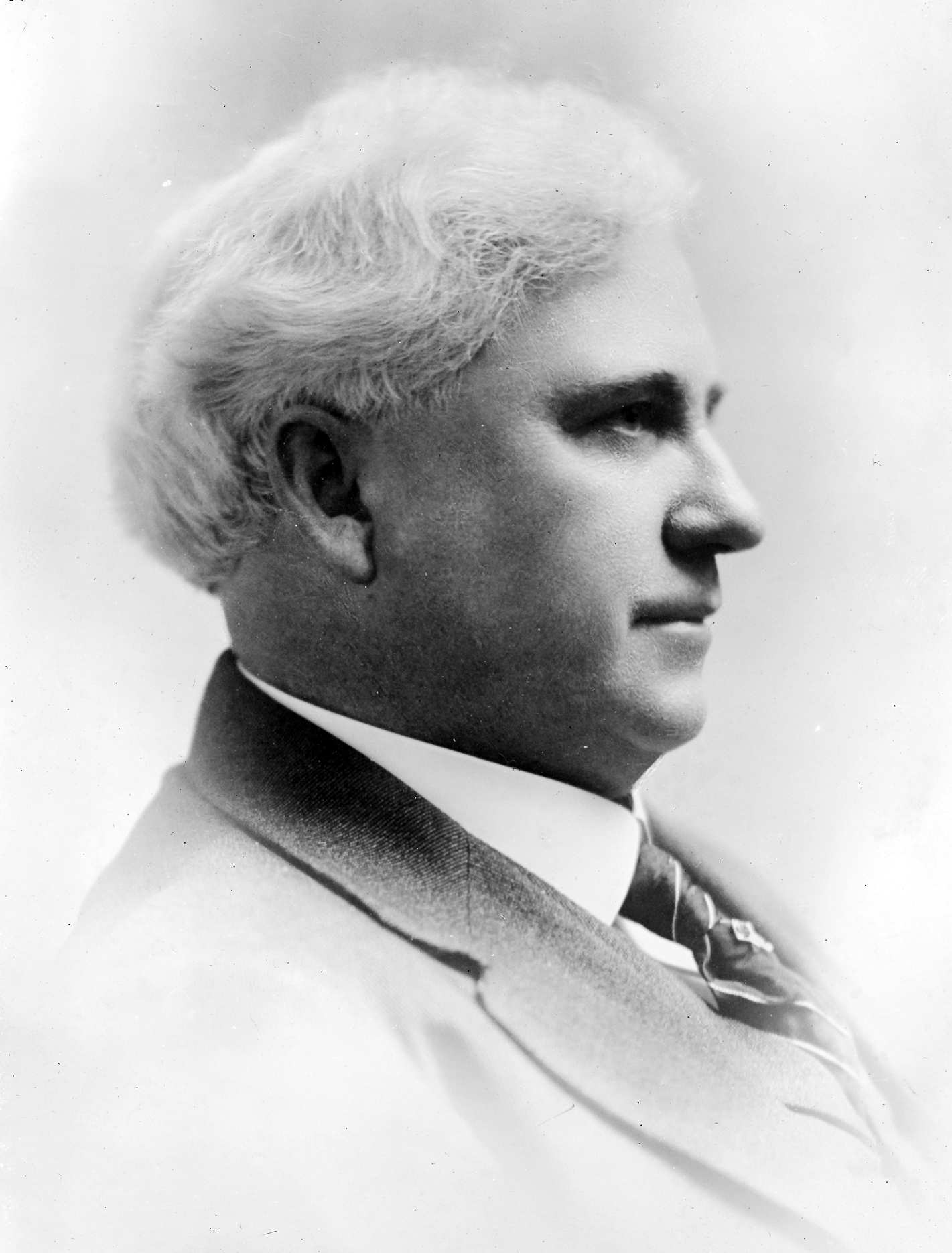

Member of the U.S. House of Representatives from Louisiana's 8th district
- In office March 4, 1913 – March 16, 1931
- Preceded by: district created
- Succeeded by: John H. Overton

President of Louisiana Tech University
- In office 1900–1904
- Preceded by: W. C. Robinson
- Succeeded by: W. E. Taylor

Louisiana Superintendent of Education
- In office 1904–1908
- Succeeded by: T. H. Harris

President of Northwestern State University
- In office 1908–1911
- Preceded by: Beverly C. Caldwell
- Succeeded by: Victor L. Roy

Personal details
- Born: December 23, 1869 Vernon, Jackson Parish, Louisiana, U.S.
- Died: March 16, 1931 (aged 61) Washington, D.C., U.S.
- Resting place: Rock Creek Cemetery; Washington, D.C., U.S.
- Party: Democratic
- Education: Peabody College; University of Nashville; University of Arkansas; University of Arkansas School of Law
- Occupation: Teacher; lawyer; politician

James Benjamin Aswell Sr. (December 23, 1869 – March 16, 1931) was a prominent educator and a Democratic U.S. representative from Louisiana, who served from 1913 until his death, which occurred twelve days into his tenth term.

== Life and career ==
Aswell was born in the Vernon community in rural Jackson Parish in north Louisiana to Benjamin W. and Elizabeth A. (Lyles) Aswell . He graduated with teaching credentials in 1892 from Peabody College. In 1893, he received the Bachelor of Arts degree from the University of Nashville, and received a Master of Arts degree from the University of Arkansas at Fayetteville the following year. In 1907, he obtained his law degree from the same institution.

He was a state school administrator before he was selected to be president of Louisiana Polytechnic Institute, now Louisiana Tech University, in 1900. He resigned in 1904 after being elected as Louisiana Superintendent of Education in 1904. He resigned his position in 1908 to be president of Louisiana State Normal School, now Northwestern State University. Aswell resigned his position in 1911 to run unsuccessfully for governor in the 1912 Democratic primary. He was defeated by Luther E. Hall, who served in the state's highest office from 1912 to 1916.

Later that year, Aswell was elected to the U.S. House from the newly created 8th congressional district, based around Natchitoches and Alexandria. Aswell was reelected nine times. During the 1920s, he was the ranking minority member of the House Agriculture Committee. He worked with the Louisiana naturalist Caroline Dormon to establish the Kisatchie National Forest in his district.

He died in Washington, D.C., and is interred there in Rock Creek Cemetery.
