= Edward White Robertson =

American politician (1823–1887)

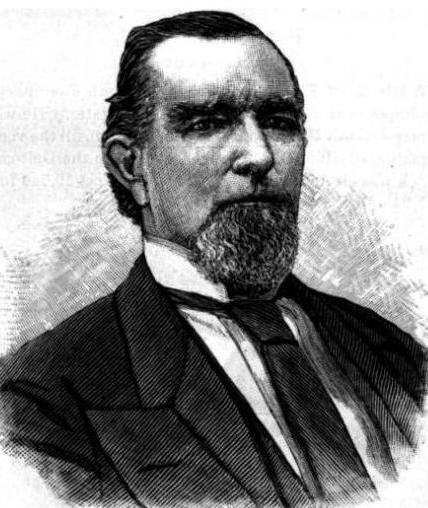
- Edward White Robertson

United States House of Representatives, Sixth District of Louisiana
- In office March 4, 1877 – March 3, 1883
- Preceded by: Charles Edmund Nash
- Succeeded by: Edward Taylor Lewis
- In office March 4, 1887 – August 2, 1887
- Preceded by: Alfred Briggs Irion
- Succeeded by: Samuel Matthews Robertson

Member of the Louisiana House of Representatives
- In office 1847-1849

Personal details
- Born: June 13, 1823 near Nashville, Tennessee
- Died: August 2, 1887 (aged 64)
- Party: Democratic
- Spouse: Mary Jane Pope
- Children: Samuel Matthews Robertson
- Education: Centenary College, Augusta College
- Occupation: Attorney

Edward White Robertson (June 13, 1823 – August 2, 1887) was a United States representative from Louisiana. He was also the father of Samuel Matthews Robertson.

== Early years ==
He was born near Nashville, Tennessee. Robertson moved with his parents to Iberville Parish, Louisiana in 1825. He attended the country schools and the preparatory department of Centenary College, Jackson, Louisiana and he attended Augusta College in Kentucky, in 1842. Later, he entered Nashville University and commenced the study of law in 1845.

== Early career ==
Robertson served in the Mexican–American War in 1846 as orderly sergeant in the Second Regiment, Louisiana Volunteers. After the war, he served as a member of the Louisiana House of Representatives 1847–1849. He later graduated from the law department of the University of Louisiana in 1850. He was admitted to the bar the same year and practiced in Iberville and East Baton Rouge Parishes before he was again elected to the Louisiana House of Representatives in 1853. In addition, he served as the Louisiana state Auditor of Public Accounts 1857–1862.

== Congress ==
Robertson entered the Confederate army during the American Civil War in March 1862 as captain of a company which he had raised for the Twenty-seventh Regiment, Louisiana Infantry. Later, he resumed the practice of law in Baton Rouge. Elected as a Democrat, he served in the Forty-fifth, Forty-sixth, and Forty-seventh Congresses (March 4, 1877 – March 3, 1883). In Congress, he served as chairman, Committee on the Mississippi Levees (Forty-fifth Congress), and as a member Committee on Levees and Improvements of the Mississippi River (Forty-sixth Congress). He was unsuccessful candidate for renomination in 1882 to the Forty-eighth Congress. He was elected to the Fiftieth Congress and served from March 4, 1887, until his death.

== Death ==
Robertson died in Baton Rouge, Louisiana on August 2, 1887. He was buried in Magnolia Cemetery in Baton Rouge, Louisiana.

== See also ==
- List of members of the United States Congress who died in office (1790–1899)

U.S. House of Representatives
Preceded by Charles Edmund Nash	Member of the U.S. House of Representatives from Louisiana's 6th congressional district 1877–1883	Succeeded by Edward Taylor Lewis
Preceded by Alfred Briggs Irion	Member of the U.S. House of Representatives from Louisiana's 6th congressional district 1887–1887	Succeeded by Samuel Matthews Robertson
