= Louisiana's 6th congressional district =

U.S. House district for Louisiana

Coordinates: 30°17′51″N 91°01′30″W

- Interactive map of district boundaries
- Representative: Cleo Fields; D–Baton Rouge
- Distribution: 78.12% urban; 21.88% rural
- Population (2025): 753,026
- Median household income: $52,853
- Ethnicity: 54.4% Black; 36.0% White; 4.7% Hispanic; 2.8% Two or more races; 1.4% Asian; 0.7% other
- Cook PVI: R+16

Louisiana's 6th congressional district is a congressional district in the U.S. state of Louisiana. The district covers a backslash-shaped region stretching from Shreveport in the northwest of the state, roughly following the Red River of the South and the Mississippi River to the state capital of Baton Rouge, encompassing most of the majority-Black areas in between.

The district is currently represented by Democrat Cleo Fields, who represented the 4th district from 1993 to 1997 when it was constituted as majority Black.

== History ==
For most of its existence, the 6th congressional district has contained a significant portion of Baton Rouge. Since its creation, its boundaries have migrated from a position astraddle the Mississippi River to completely east of the Mississippi River and subsequently, astraddle the river again.

For decades prior to 1972, the district was virtually coterminous with the Florida Parishes. In 1972, the district shed St. Tammany Parish to the 1st congressional district, and since then several redistrictings have incrementally moved the district's boundaries westward so that it has shed both Washington and Tangipahoa parishes (including Hammond, home of James H. Morrison, who represented the district for 24 years, the longest tenure of anyone ever to represent the district) to the 1st district.

For most of its existence, the district's lines generally followed parish lines. In the 1990s redistricting, however, most of the district's black voters were transferred to the black-majority 4th district. Those lines, however, were thrown out in 1995 when the 4th was ruled to be an unconstitutional racial gerrymander, and from 1996 to 2013, the 6th included all of Baton Rouge. After the 2010 redistricting, a gash in western Baton Rouge, including most of the city's black precincts, was transferred to the New Orleans–based 2nd district.

Following a court ruling striking down Louisiana's 2022 congressional map for violating the Voting Rights Act, a new map enacted by a special legislative session on January 22, 2024, significantly redrew the 6th. It now stretches from Caddo Parish in the northwest to East Baton Rouge Parish, and will include a majority African-American voting-age population. Most of Baton Rouge's whiter and wealthier portions, along with Louisiana State University (LSU), were shifted to the 5th district. Even without LSU, the district includes two state universities, Southern in Baton Rouge and Northwestern State in Natchitoches.

== Parishes and communities ==
For the 119th and successive Congresses (based on the districts drawn following a 2023 court order), the district contains all or portions of the following parishes and communities.

Avoyelles Parish (7)

Bunkie, Cottonport, Evergreen, Mansura (part; also 5th), Moreauville, Plaucheville, Simmesport

Caddo Parish (1)

Shreveport (part; also 4th)

DeSoto Parish (4)

Frierson, Gloster (part; also 4th), Mansfield, South Mansfield

East Baton Rouge Parish (7)

Baker, Baton Rouge (part; also 5th), Brownfields, Gardere, Merrydale, Monticello, Zachary (part; also 5th)

Lafayette Parish (3)

Carencro (part; also 3rd), Lafayette (part; also 3rd), Scott (part; also 3rd)

Natchitoches Parish (12)

All 12 communities

Pointe Coupee Parish (5)

All five communities

Rapides Parish (8)

Alexandria (part; also 4th), Ball, Boyce, Cheneyville, Deville, Echo, Lecompte, Pineville

St. Landry Parish (13)

All 13 communities

West Baton Rouge Parish (4)

All four communities

== Election results from statewide races ==
=== 2023–2027 boundaries ===
Year	Office	Results
2008	President	Obama 58% - 40%
2012	President	Obama 60% - 40%
2014	Senate	Landrieu 61% - 39%
2015	Governor	Bel Edwards 73% - 27%
2015	Lt. Governor	Holden 67% - 33%
2016	President	Clinton 58% - 39%
2016	Senate	Campbell 60% - 40%
2019	Governor	Bel Edwards 68% - 32%
2019	Lt. Governor	Nungesser 51% - 49%
2019	Attorney General	Jackson 51% - 49%
2020	President	Biden 59% - 39%
2023	Attorney General	Cheek 53% - 47%
2024	President	Harris 57% - 42%

=== 2027–2033 boundaries ===
Year	Office	Results
2008	President	McCain 68% - 31%
2012	President	Romney 68% - 32%
2016	President	Trump 65% - 31%
2016	Senate	Kennedy 67% - 31%
2019	Governor	Rispone 53% - 46%
2019	Lt. Governor	Nungesser 73% - 27%
2019	Attorney General	Landry 70% - 30%
2020	President	Trump 65% - 33%
2023	Governor	Landry 69% - 26%
2024	President	Trump 65% - 33%

== List of members representing the district ==
Member	Party	Years	Cong ress	Electoral history	Location
District created March 4, 1875
Charles E. Nash (Washington)	Republican	March 4, 1875 – March 3, 1877	44th	Elected in 1874. Lost re-election.	
Edward White Robertson (Baton Rouge)	Democratic	March 4, 1877 – March 3, 1883	45th 46th 47th	Elected in 1876. Re-elected in 1878. Re-elected in 1880. Lost renomination.	
Edward Taylor Lewis (Opelousas)	Democratic	March 4, 1883 – March 3, 1885	48th	Elected to finish member-elect Andrew Herron's term. Lost renomination.	
Alfred Briggs Irion (Marksville)	Democratic	March 4, 1885 – March 3, 1887	49th	Elected in 1884. Lost renomination.	
Edward White Robertson (Baton Rouge)	Democratic	March 4, 1887 – August 2, 1887	50th	Elected in 1886. Died.	
Vacant		August 2, 1887 – December 5, 1887	50th		
Samuel Matthews Robertson (Baton Rouge)	Democratic	December 5, 1887 – March 3, 1907	50th 51st 52nd 53rd 54th 55th 56th 57th 58th 59th	Elected to finish his father's term. Re-elected in 1888. Re-elected in 1890. Re-elected in 1892. Re-elected in 1894. Re-elected in 1896. Re-elected in 1898. Re-elected in 1900. Re-elected in 1902. Re-elected in 1904. Lost renomination.	
George Kent Favrot (Baton Rouge)	Democratic	March 4, 1907 – March 3, 1909	60th	Elected in 1906. Lost renomination.	
Robert Charles Wickliffe (St. Francisville)	Democratic	March 4, 1909 – June 11, 1912	61st 62nd	Elected in 1908. Re-elected in 1910. Died.	
Vacant		June 11, 1912 – November 5, 1912	62nd		
Lewis Lovering Morgan (Covington)	Democratic	November 5, 1912 – March 3, 1917	62nd 63rd 64th	Elected to finish Wickliffe's term. Also elected to the next full term. Re-elected in 1914. Retired.	
Jared Young Sanders (Bogalusa)	Democratic	March 4, 1917 – March 3, 1921	65th 66th	Elected in 1916. Re-elected in 1918. Retired.	
George Kent Favrot (Baton Rouge)	Democratic	March 4, 1921 – March 3, 1925	67th 68th	Elected in 1920. Re-elected in 1922. Lost renomination.	
Bolivar E. Kemp (Amite)	Democratic	March 4, 1925 – June 19, 1933	69th 70th 71st 72nd 73rd	Elected in 1924. Re-elected in 1926. Re-elected in 1928. Re-elected in 1930. Re-elected in 1932. Died.	
Vacant		June 19, 1933 – May 1, 1934	73rd		
Jared Y. Sanders Jr. (Baton Rouge)	Democratic	May 1, 1934 – January 3, 1937	73rd 74th	Elected to finish Kemp's term. (Note: Kemp's wife, Lallie, was elected in the 1933 special election; however, a dispute over the election meant neither she nor Sanders Jr. took office before the election was annulled by the House of Representatives on January 29, 1934.); Re-elected in 1934. Lost renomination.	
John K. Griffith (Slidell)	Democratic	January 3, 1937 – January 3, 1941	75th 76th	Elected in 1936. Re-elected in 1938. Lost renomination.	
Jared Y. Sanders Jr. (Baton Rouge)	Democratic	January 3, 1941 – January 3, 1943	77th	Elected in 1940. Lost renomination.	
James H. Morrison (Hammond)	Democratic	January 3, 1943 – January 3, 1967	78th 79th 80th 81st 82nd 83rd 84th 85th 86th 87th 88th 89th	Elected in 1942. Re-elected in 1944. Re-elected in 1946. Re-elected in 1948. Re-elected in 1950. Re-elected in 1952. Re-elected in 1954. Re-elected in 1956. Re-elected in 1958. Re-elected in 1960. Re-elected in 1962. Re-elected in 1964. Lost renomination.	
John Rarick (St. Francisville)	Democratic	January 3, 1967 – January 3, 1975	90th 91st 92nd 93rd	Elected in 1966. Re-elected in 1968. Re-elected in 1970. Re-elected in 1972. Lost renomination.	
Henson Moore (Baton Rouge)	Republican	January 3, 1975 – January 3, 1987	94th 95th 96th 97th 98th 99th	Elected in 1974. Re-elected in 1976. Re-elected in 1978. Re-elected in 1980. Re-elected in 1982. Re-elected in 1984. Retired to run for U.S. senator.	
Richard Baker (Baton Rouge)	Republican	January 3, 1987 – February 2, 2008	100th 101st 102nd 103rd 104th 105th 106th 107th 108th 109th 110th	Elected in 1986. Re-elected in 1988. Re-elected in 1990. Re-elected in 1992. Re-elected in 1994. Re-elected in 1996. Re-elected in 1998. Re-elected in 2000. Re-elected in 2002. Re-elected in 2004. Re-elected in 2006. Resigned to take a lobbying position at the Managed Funds Association.	
Richard Baker (Baton Rouge)	Republican	January 3, 1987 – February 2, 2008	100th 101st 102nd 103rd 104th 105th 106th 107th 108th 109th 110th	Elected in 1986. Re-elected in 1988. Re-elected in 1990. Re-elected in 1992. Re-elected in 1994. Re-elected in 1996. Re-elected in 1998. Re-elected in 2000. Re-elected in 2002. Re-elected in 2004. Re-elected in 2006. Resigned to take a lobbying position at the Managed Funds Association.	2003–2013
Vacant		February 2, 2008 – May 3, 2008	110th		2003–2013
Don Cazayoux (New Roads)	Democratic	May 3, 2008 – January 3, 2009	110th	Elected to finish Baker's term. Lost re-election.	2003–2013
Bill Cassidy (Baton Rouge)	Republican	January 3, 2009 – January 3, 2015	111th 112th 113th	Elected in 2008. Re-elected in 2010. Re-elected in 2012. Retired to run for U.S. Senator.	2003–2013
Bill Cassidy (Baton Rouge)	Republican	January 3, 2009 – January 3, 2015	111th 112th 113th	Elected in 2008. Re-elected in 2010. Re-elected in 2012. Retired to run for U.S. Senator.	2013–2023
Garret Graves (Baton Rouge)	Republican	January 3, 2015 – January 3, 2025	114th 115th 116th 117th 118th	Elected in 2014. Re-elected in 2016. Re-elected in 2018. Re-elected in 2020. Re-elected in 2022. Retired due to redistricting.	2013–2023
Garret Graves (Baton Rouge)	Republican	January 3, 2015 – January 3, 2025	114th 115th 116th 117th 118th	Elected in 2014. Re-elected in 2016. Re-elected in 2018. Re-elected in 2020. Re-elected in 2022. Retired due to redistricting.	2023–2025
Cleo Fields (Baton Rouge)	Democratic	January 3, 2025 – present	119th	Elected in 2024. Retiring at the end of term to run for State Senate.	2025–present

== 2000s election results ==
=== 2002 ===
Louisiana's 6th Congressional District Runoff Election (2002)
Party	Candidate	Votes	%
Republican	Richard H. Baker*	146,932	84.04
Libertarian	Rick Moscatello	27,898	15.96
Total votes		174,830	100.00
Turnout			
Republican hold			

=== 2004 ===
Louisiana's 6th Congressional District Election (2004)
Party	Candidate	Votes	%
Republican	Richard H. Baker*	188,980	72.24
Democratic	Rufus Craig, Jr.	50,642	19.36
Democratic	Edward "Scott" Galmon	21,987	8.41
Total votes		261,609	100.00
Turnout			
Republican hold			

=== 2006 ===
Louisiana's 6th Congressional District Election (2006)
Party	Candidate	Votes	%
Republican	Richard H. Baker*	94,658	82.81
Libertarian	Richard Fontanesi	19,648	17.19
Total votes		114,306	100.00
Turnout			
Republican hold			

=== 2008 ===
Louisiana's 6th Congressional District Special Election (May 3, 2008)
Party	Candidate	Votes	%
Democratic	Don Cazayoux	49,703	49.20
Republican	Woody Jenkins	46,746	46.78
Independent	Ashley Casey	3,718	3.68
Independent	Peter J. Aranyosi	448	0.44
Constitution	Randall T. Hayes	402	0.40
Total votes		101,017	100.00
Turnout			
Democratic gain from Republican			

Louisiana's 6th Congressional District General Election (2008)
Party	Candidate	Votes	%
Republican	Bill Cassidy	150,332	48.12
Democratic	Don Cazayoux*	125,886	40.29
Independent	Michael Jackson	36,198	11.59
Total votes		312,416	100.00
Turnout			
Republican gain from Democratic			

=== 2010 ===
Louisiana's 6th Congressional District Election (2010)
Party	Candidate	Votes	%
Republican	Bill Cassidy*	138,607	65.63
Democratic	Merritt E. McDonald, Sr.	72,577	34.37
Total votes		211,184	100.00
Turnout			
Republican hold			

=== 2012 ===
Louisiana's 6th Congressional District Election (2012)
Party	Candidate	Votes	%
Republican	Bill Cassidy*	243,553	79.41
Libertarian	Rufus Holt Craig, Jr.	32,185	10.49
Independent	Richard Torregano	30,975	10.10
Total votes		306,713	100.00
Turnout			
Republican hold			

=== 2014 ===
Louisiana's 6th Congressional District Runoff Election (2014)
Party	Candidate	Votes	%
Republican	Garret Graves*	139,209	62.4
Democratic	Edwin Edwards	83,781	37.6
Total votes		222,990	100.00
Turnout			
Republican hold			

=== 2016 ===
Louisiana's 6th Congressional District Election (2016)
Party	Candidate	Votes	%
Republican	Garret Graves*	207,483	63
Republican	Robert Lamar "Bob" Bell	33,592	10
Libertarian	Richard M. Fontanesi	7,603	2
Other	Devin Lance Graham	3,218	1
Democratic	Richard Lieberman	49,380	15
Democratic	Jermaine Sampson	29,822	9
Total votes		331,098	100.00
Turnout			71.3
Republican hold			

=== 2018 ===
Louisiana's 6th Congressional District Election (2018)
Party	Candidate	Votes	%
Republican	Garret Graves*	186,553	69.5
Democratic	Justin DeWitt	55,089	20.5
Democratic	Andie Saizan	21,627	8.1
Other	Devin Lance Graham	5,256	2.0
Total votes		268,525	100.00
Turnout			
Republican hold			

=== 2020 ===
Louisiana's 6th congressional district, 2020
Party	Candidate	Votes	%
Republican	Garret Graves*	265,706	71.05
Democratic	Dartanyon Williams	95,541	25.55
Libertarian	Shannon Sloan	9,732	2.60
Independent	Richard Torregano	3,017	0.81
Total votes		373,996	100.0
Republican hold			

=== 2022 ===
Louisiana's 6th congressional district, 2022
Party	Candidate	Votes	%
Republican	Garret Graves*	189,684	80.4
Libertarian	Rufus Holt Craig	30,709	13.0
Republican	Brian Belzer	15,535	6.6
Total votes		235,928	100.0
Republican hold			

=== 2024 ===
2024 Louisiana's 6th congressional district election
Party	Candidate	Votes	%
Democratic	Cleo Fields	150,323	50.8
Republican	Elbert Guillory	111,737	37.7
Democratic	Quentin Anderson	23,811	8.0
Democratic	Peter Williams	6,252	2.1
Democratic	Wilken Jones Jr.	3,910	1.3
Total votes		296,033	100.0
Democratic gain from Republican			

== See also ==
- Louisiana's congressional districts
- List of United States congressional districts
