= Alfred Briggs Irion =

American politician (1833–1903)

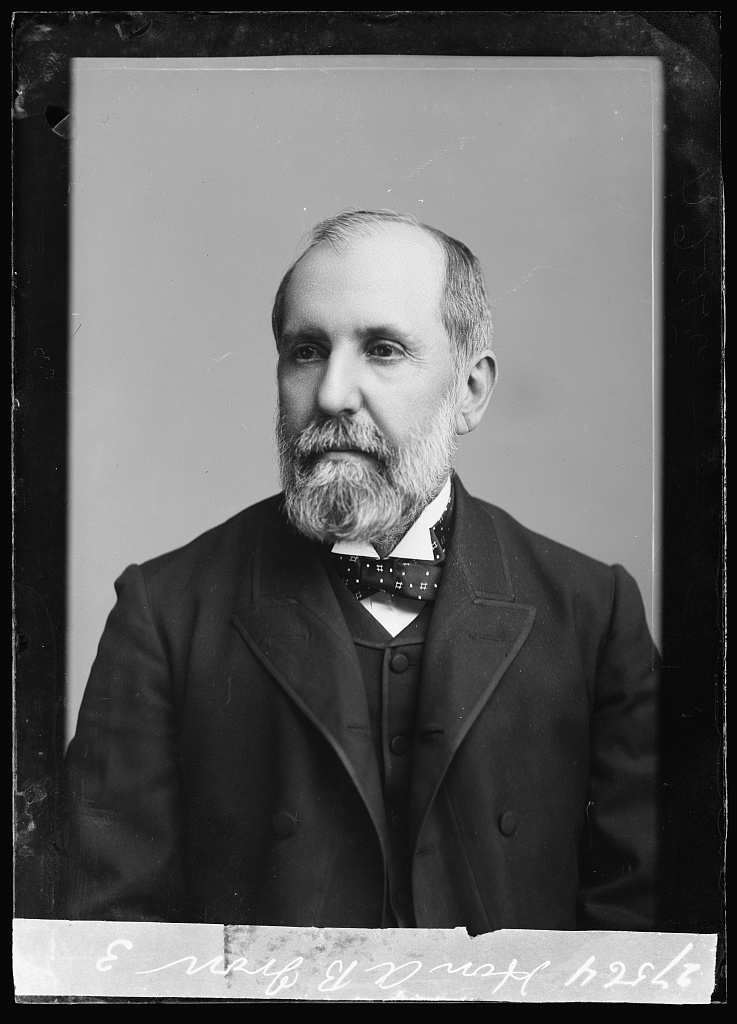

United States Representative from Louisiana's 6th congressional district
- In office March 4, 1885 – March 3, 1887
- Preceded by: Edward T. Lewis
- Succeeded by: Edward White Robertson

Member of the Louisiana House of Representatives
- In office 1864-1865

Personal details
- Born: February 18, 1833 Evergreen; Avoyelles Parish, Louisiana, USA
- Died: May 21, 1903 (aged 70) New Orleans, Louisiana
- Resting place: Baptist Cemetery in Evergreen, Louisiana
- Party: Democratic
- Relations: Alvan Lafargue (grandson) Malcolm Lafargue (great-grandson) Adolphe Lafargue (son-in-law)
- Children: At least two daughters: Annie and Emma Lafargue
- Education: Franklin College in Opelousas, Louisiana; University of North Carolina at Chapel Hill
- Occupation: Lawyer and farmer

Military service
- Allegiance: Confederate States of America
- Branch/service: Confederate States Army
- Unit: 28th Texas Cavalry

Alfred Briggs Irion (February 18, 1833 – May 21, 1903) was a U. S. Representative for Louisiana's 6th congressional district.

== Biography ==
Born near rural Evergreen in Avoyelles Parish, Irion attended the common schools, Franklin College in Opelousas, and graduated from the University of North Carolina at Chapel Hill in 1855. He studied law privately and was admitted to the bar in 1857. He launched his practice in Marksville, the seat of government of Avoyelles Parish. He served as delegate to the Louisiana secession convention in 1860 and opposed the secession of the southern states.

During the Civil War, Irion served in the Confederate States Army. He was in the 28th Texas Cavalry Regiment under Colonel Horace Randal, part of General John George Walker's Greyhound Division. He served as member of the Louisiana House of Representatives in 1864 and 1865. when he returned to his law practice. He was the editor of a local newspaper in Marksville from 1866 to 1874. He moved to his native Evergreen in 1870 and engaged there in planting. He continued the practice of law and also engaged in literary pursuits. He was a member of the Louisiana Constitutional Convention in 1879. From 1880 to 1884, he served as judge of the Louisiana Court of Appeal for the Third Circuit.

Irion was elected as a Democrat to the Forty-ninth Congress (March 4, 1885 – March 3, 1887) but was an unsuccessful candidate for renomination. He died in New Orleans and is interred in the Baptist Cemetery in Evergreen, Louisiana.

== Notes ==
U.S. House of Representatives
Preceded by Edward T. Lewis	Member of the U.S. House of Representatives from Louisiana's 6th congressional district 1885–1887	Succeeded by Edward White Robertson
