= Lewis L. Morgan =

American politician (1876–1950)

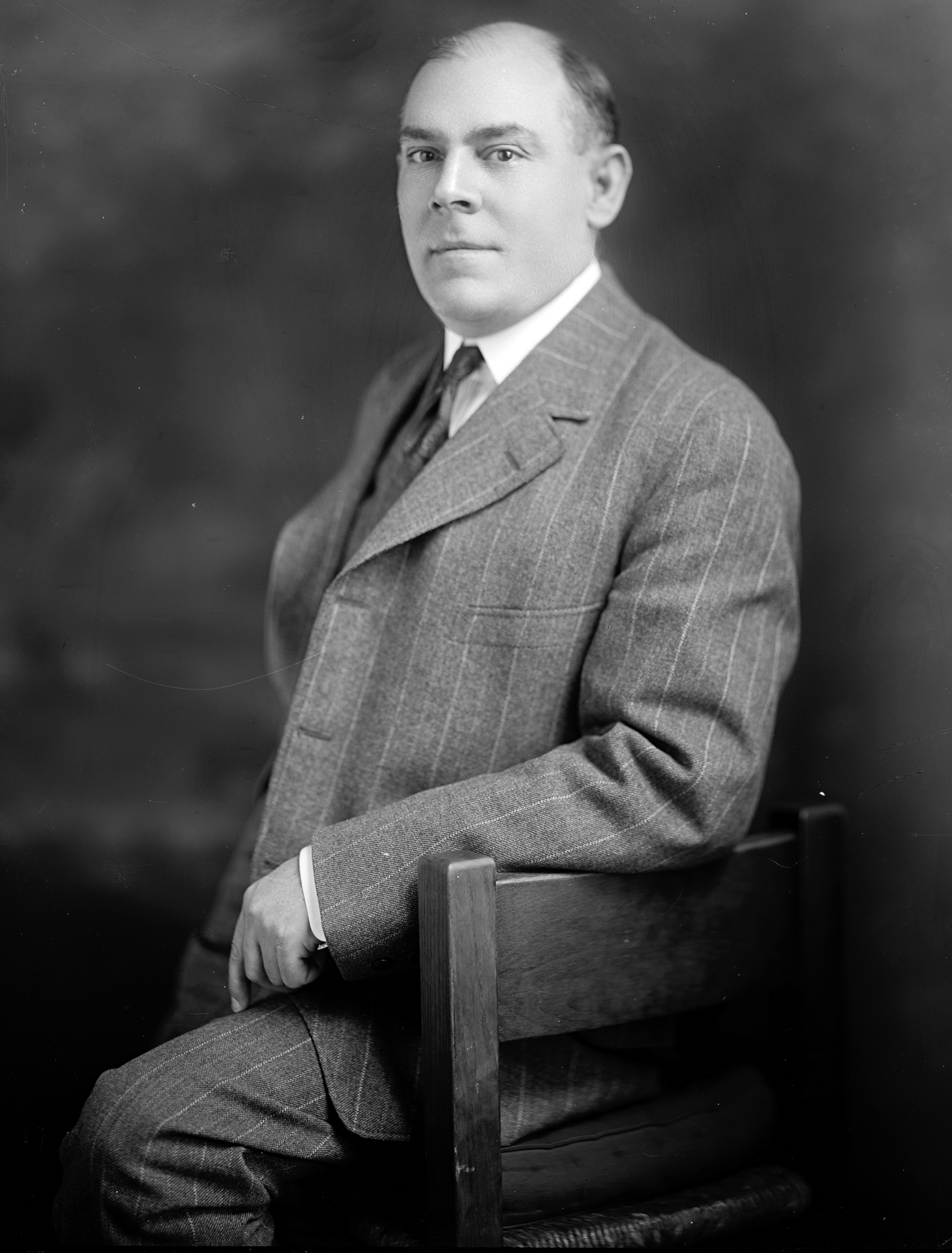
- Harris & Ewing portrait of Morgan, taken between 1905 and 1945

Member of the U.S. House of Representatives from Louisiana's 6th district
- In office November 5, 1912 – March 3, 1917
- Preceded by: Robert Charles Wickliffe
- Succeeded by: Jared Y. Sanders Sr.

Member of the Louisiana House of Representatives
- In office 1908
- Preceded by: Fritz Salman
- Succeeded by: Joseph B. Lancaster

Personal details
- Born: Lewis Lovering Morgan; March 2, 1876 Mandeville, Louisiana, US
- Died: June 10, 1950 (aged 74) New Orleans, Louisiana, US
- Party: Democratic
- Occupation: Politician, lawyer

Lewis Lovering Morgan Sr. (March 2, 1876 – June 10, 1950) was an American politician and lawyer. A Democrat, he was a member of the United States House of Representatives from Louisiana. Born in Mandeville, Louisiana, he served in the House from 1912 to 1917, representing Louisiana's 6th district.

== Biography ==
Morgan was born on March 2, 1876, in Mandeville, Louisiana, the son of David Bannister Morgan and Charlotte Lovering. He graduated from the Tulane University School of Law in 1899, after which he was admitted to the bar, and in 1902, began practicing law in Covington. From 1908 to 1912, he was a district attorney for the 22nd judicial district. He served as an attorney for the Louisiana Highway Commission and the New Orleans Dock Board. He was also president of the St. Tammany Parish school board for some time.

Morgan was a Democrat. In 1909, he was a member of the Louisiana House of Representatives. He was a delegate to the Democratic National Conventions of 1912, 1928, and 1936, and was a delegate to the state conventions of 1912, 1916, 1920, and 1924.

After the death of Robert Charles Wickliffe, Morgan was elected to the United States House of Representatives. He served from November 5, 1912, to March 3, 1917, representing Louisiana's 6th district. While serving, he was chairman of the Committee on Elections and a member of the Committee on Natural Resources. He was not nominated for the following election. In 1944, he unsuccessfully ran for Governor of Louisiana. Politically, he aligned with Governor Huey Long and James H. Morrison.

After serving in Congress, Morgan returned to practicing law, in Covington and New Orleans. He was married to Lenora Cefalu, with whom he had two children. He died on June 10, 1950, aged 74, in New Orleans, and was buried at Covington Cemetery.

U.S. House of Representatives
| Preceded by Robert Charles Wickliffe | Member of the U.S. House of Representatives from Louisiana's 6th congressional district 1912-1917 | Succeeded by Jared Y. Sanders |
Louisiana House of Representatives
| Preceded by Fritz Salman | Louisiana State Representative for St. Tammany Parish; Lewis Lovering Morgan; 1908-1909 | Succeeded by Joseph B. Lancaster |
