= 1908 Louisiana gubernatorial election =

- January 28, 1908
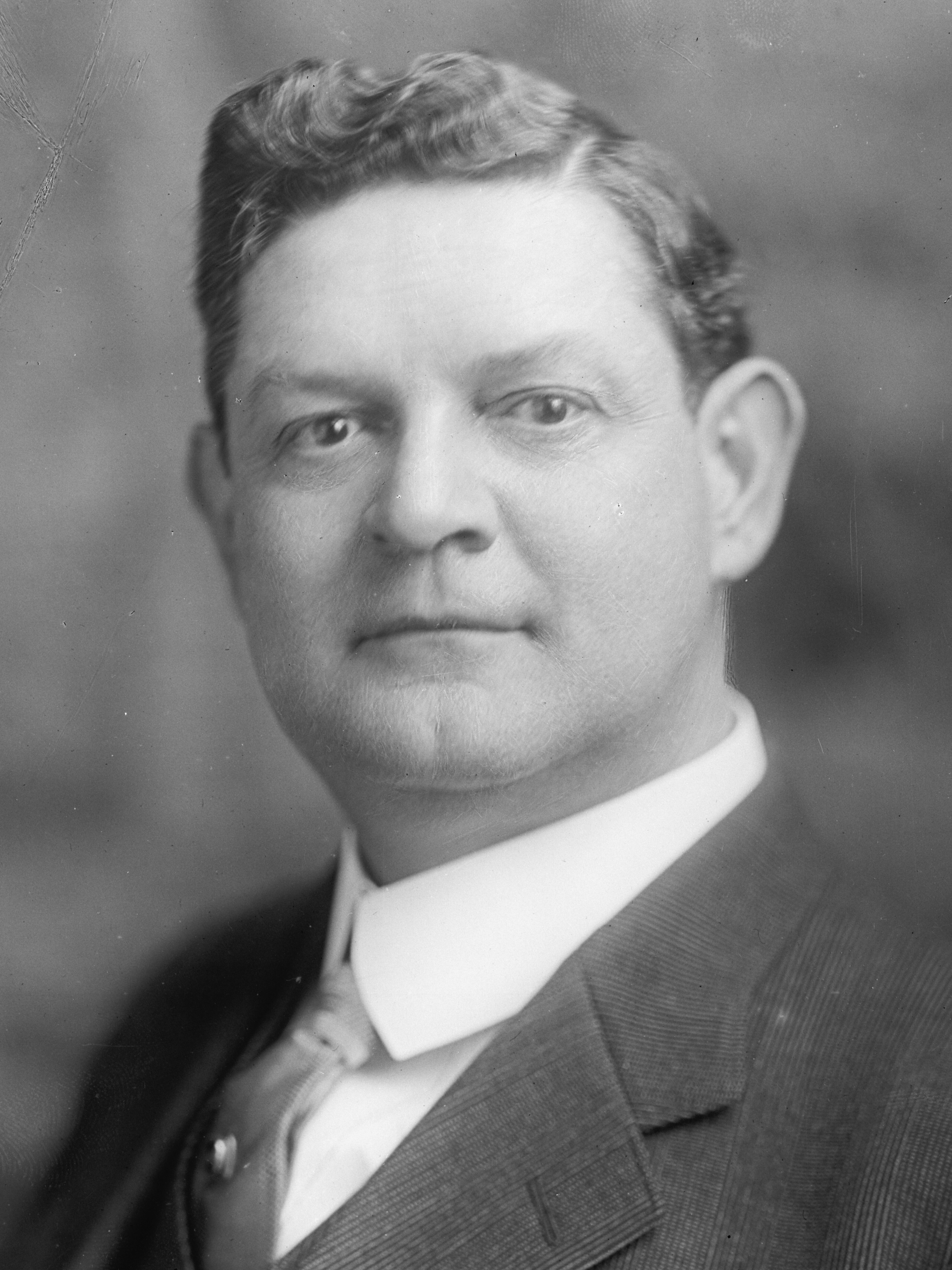

| Candidate | Jared Y. Sanders Sr. | Henry Newton Pharr |
| Party | Democratic | Republican |
| Popular vote | 60,066 | 7,617 |
| Percentage | 86.39% | 10.95% |
- Parish Results; Sanders: 60–70% 70–80% 80–90% 90–100%
Governor before election
Newton C. Blanchard
Democratic
Elected Governor
Jared Y. Sanders, Sr.
Democratic

The 1908 Louisiana gubernatorial election was held on April 21, 1908. Like most Southern states between Reconstruction and the civil rights era, Louisiana's Republican Party had minimal electoral support because of the mass disenfranchisement of African Americans. This meant that the Democratic Party primary held on January 28 was the most important contest to determine who would be governor. This election marked the first time Louisiana used primaries to nominate party nominees. Republicans nominated Henry Newton Pharr, son of the party's 1896 nominee, John Newton Pharr. The election resulted in the election of Democrat Jared Y. Sanders Sr. as governor of Louisiana.

== Democratic primary ==
=== Candidates ===
- Jared Y. Sanders Sr., Lieutenant Governor of Louisiana
- Theodore S. Wilkinson, former State Representative from Plaquemines Parish

=== Results ===
1908 Democratic gubernatorial primary
| Party | Candidate | Votes | % |
|---|---|---|---|
| Democratic | Jared Y. Sanders Sr. | 60,176 | 56.29% |
| Democratic | Theodore S. Wilkinson | 46,729 | 43.71% |
| Total votes | | 106,905 | 100.00% |

== General election ==
=== Candidates ===
- James Barnes (Socialist)
- Henry Newton Pharr, sugar planter and son of 1898 nominee John Newton Pharr (Republican)
- Jared Y. Sanders Sr., Lieutenant Governor of Louisiana (Democratic)

=== Results ===
1908 Louisiana gubernatorial election
| Party | Candidate | Votes | % | ±% |
|---|---|---|---|---|
| Democratic | Jared Y. Sanders Sr. | 60,066 | 86.39% | |
| Republican | Henry Newton Pharr | 7,617 | 10.95% | |
| Socialist | James Barnes | 1,247 | 1.79% | |
| Total votes | | 69,530 | 100.00% | |
