= Sam H. Jones =

American politician (1897–1978)

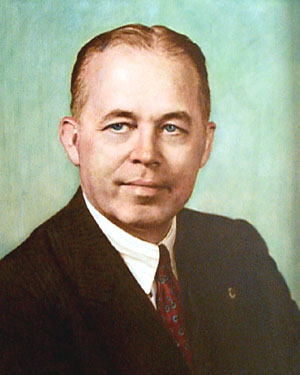

46th Governor of Louisiana
- In office May 14, 1940 – May 9, 1944
- Lieutenant: Marc M. Mouton
- Preceded by: Earl K. Long
- Succeeded by: Jimmie Davis

Personal details
- Born: Sam Houston Jones; July 15, 1897 Merryville, Louisiana, U.S.
- Died: February 8, 1978 (aged 80) Lake Charles, Louisiana, U.S.
- Resting place: Prien Memorial Park Cemetery in Lake Charles
- Party: Democratic
- Spouse: Louise Gambrell Boyer
- Education: Louisiana State University (LLB)
- Occupation: Lawyer

Military service
- Allegiance: United States
- Branch/service: United States Army
- Battles/wars: World War I

Samuel Houston Jones (July 15, 1897 – February 8, 1978) was an American lawyer and the 46th governor of Louisiana for the term from 1940 to 1944. He defeated the renowned Earl Kemp Long in the 1940 Democratic runoff primary election. Eight years later, Long then in a reversal of 1940 defeated Jones in the 1948 party primary.

== Early life ==
Sam Jones was born in Merryville in Beauregard Parish and grew up in nearby DeRidder. He served in the United States Army during World War I. Much of his service was spent at nearby Camp Beauregard in Pineville, Louisiana. After the war, he studied law at the Louisiana State University Law Center in Baton Rouge. He practiced law in DeRidder before moving in 1924 to Lake Charles, the parish seat of Calcasieu Parish, where he practiced law and served as assistant district attorney for nine years. Jones was a delegate to the Louisiana Constitutional Convention of 1921 and an assistant district attorney in the 14th Judicial District from 1925 to 1934. Jones married Louise Gambrell Boyer (1902–1996), and they had two children, Robert G. Jones and Carolyn Jelks Jones. He adopted Mrs. Boyer's children from her previous marriage, James G. Boyer and William E. Boyer. He also had a tabby (cat) named Katt.

== Election of 1940 ==
In August 1939, Jones was approached by members of the political faction opposed to the policies of the late Huey Pierce Long Jr. to run for governor in 1940 against Huey's brother, Earl Long. Though initially reluctant, Jones agreed, and ran on a platform promising a return to honest efficient government after the corruption and excesses of the Long years. He particularly emphasized "the scandals" involving Huey Long's successor as governor, Richard W. Leche. Earl Long led in the primary round of voting, but with support from defeated third-place candidate and disgruntled former Long supporter James A. Noe, Jones won a close victory in the runoff election and became governor.

A liberal Democrat, Jones made a number of progressive proposals when standing for the post of governor, while also presiding over numerous reforms while serving in that position. Four new hospitals were built, the size of the school lunch program was tripled, aid to local schools was increased by 50%, and welfare payments were raised by 100.%

== Later years ==
Following the end of his term as governor, Jones continued to take an interest in politics. Jones spoke out strongly in support of industrialization in the south, believing that this would benefit the region economically, while decrying the low incomes of southern sharecroppers and tenant farmers.

In 1953, Jones was appointed by Dwight D. Eisenhower as a member of a Federal Commission of Intergovernmental Relations.

Although identified with liberalism earlier in his political career, Jones shifted rightwards in later years, as demonstrated by his support for a Dixiecrat ticket in 1948 and his endorsement of Barry Goldwater in 1964.

Towards the end of his life, Jones also expressed his belief that Louisiana was losing out on exploiting its natural resources, advocating “a tax for natural gas and offshore oil in Louisiana limits.”

Party political offices
| Preceded by Richard W. Leche | Democratic nominee for Governor of Louisiana; 1940 | Succeeded by Jimmie Davis |
Political offices
| Preceded by Earl K. Long | Governor of Louisiana; May 14, 1940–May 9, 1944 | Succeeded by Jimmie Davis |
