= Jared Y. Sanders Sr. =

American politician (1869–1944)

Jared Young Sanders Sr.
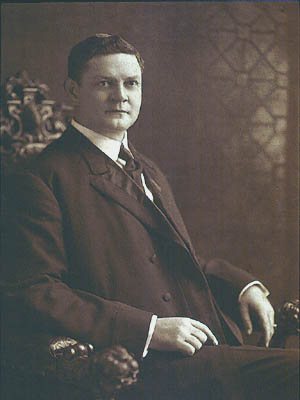

Member of the U.S. House of Representatives from Louisiana's 6th district
- In office March 4, 1917 – March 3, 1921
- Preceded by: Lewis L. Morgan
- Succeeded by: George K. Favrot

34th Governor of Louisiana
- In office May 12, 1908 – May 14, 1912
- Lieutenant: Paul M. Lambremont
- Preceded by: Newton C. Blanchard
- Succeeded by: Luther E. Hall

25th Lieutenant Governor of Louisiana
- In office May 10, 1904 – May 12, 1908
- Governor: Newton C. Blanchard
- Preceded by: Newton C. Blanchard
- Succeeded by: Paul M. Lambremont

Member of the Louisiana House of Representatives
- In office 1892–1896; 1898–1904

Personal details
- Born: Jared Young Sanders; January 29, 1869 Inglewood Plantation, east of Morgan City, Louisiana
- Died: March 23, 1944 (aged 75) Baton Rouge, Louisiana
- Resting place: Franklin Cemetery in Franklin, Louisiana
- Party: Democratic
- Spouses: Ada Veronica Shaw (m. 1891; div. 1912) Emma Dickinson Sanders (m. 1916)
- Children: Jared Y. Sanders Jr.
- Education: Tulane University
- Occupation: Lawyer

Jared Young Sanders Sr. (January 29, 1869 – March 23, 1944) was an American journalist and attorney from Franklin, the seat of St. Mary Parish in south Louisiana, who served as his state's House Speaker (1900–1904), lieutenant governor (1904–1908), the 34th governor (1908–1912), and U.S. representative (1917–1921). Near the end of his political career he was a part of the anti-Long faction within the Louisiana Democratic Party. Huey Pierce Long Jr., in fact had once grappled with Sanders in the lobby of the Roosevelt Hotel in New Orleans.

He married Ada Veronica Shaw on May 31, 1891, and they had one son, Jared Y. Sanders Jr. They divorced in 1912. Sanders remarried to Emma Dickinson in 1916.

Jared Y. Sanders died at Our Lady of the Lake Hospital in Baton Rouge on March 23, 1944.

== Footnotes ==
Party political offices
Preceded by Newton C. Blanchard	Democratic nominee for Governor of Louisiana; 1908	Succeeded by Luther E. Hall
Louisiana House of Representatives
Preceded by Placide P. Sigur	Louisiana State Representative from St. Mary Parish; 1892–1896	Succeeded by W.A. O'Neil
Preceded by W.A. O'Neil	Louisiana State Representative from St. Mary Parish; 1898–1904	Succeeded by R.W. Allen
Preceded by Samuel P. Henry of Cameron Parish	Speaker of the Louisiana House of Representatives; 1900–1904	Succeeded by Robert H. Snyder of Tensas Parish
Political offices
Preceded by Albert Estopinal of St. Bernard Parish	Lieutenant Governor of Louisiana; 1904–1908	Succeeded by Paul M. Lambremont of St. James Parish
Preceded by Newton C. Blanchard	Governor of Louisiana; 1908–1912	Succeeded by Luther E. Hall
U.S. House of Representatives
Preceded by Lewis Lovering Morgan	Member of the U.S. House of Representatives from Louisiana's 6th congressional district 1917–1921	Succeeded by George Kent Favrot
