= Sam Caldwell =

American politician

Samuel Shepherd Caldwell

Mayor of Shreveport, Louisiana
- In office 1934–1946
- Preceded by: George W. Hardy, Jr.
- Succeeded by: Clyde Fant

Personal details
- Born: November 4, 1892 Mooringsport, Louisiana, US
- Died: August 14, 1953 (aged 60) Shreveport, Louisiana
- Party: Democratic Party
- Spouse: Anna Pauline Owen Caldwell (married 1914-1953, his death)
- Children: Betty Ann Caldwell Morgan Burke
- Education: Louisiana Tech University
- Occupation: Oilman

Samuel Shepherd Caldwell (November 4, 1892 – August 14, 1953), was a Louisiana oilman and politician who served as mayor of Shreveport, Louisiana, from 1934 to 1946.

Caldwell was an unusually staunch segregationist even for the era in the Deep South. In 1943, Caldwell chose to turn down $67,000 in federal funds for a new medical center because it would have required hiring 12 blacks out of every 100 workers. (Shreveport was 37% African American in the 1940 census.) "We are not going to be bribed by federal funds," Caldwell explained, "to accept the negro as our political or social equal"; federal officials would not "cram the negro down our throats."

Preceded by George W. Hardy, Jr.	Mayor of Shreveport, Louisiana; 1934–1946	Succeeded by Clyde Fant
Preceded by Lee Emmett Thomas (1927); No LMA from 1928 to 1936	President of the Louisiana Municipal Association; 1937–1939	Succeeded by J. Maxim Roy
