= James H. Morrison =

American politician (1908–2000)

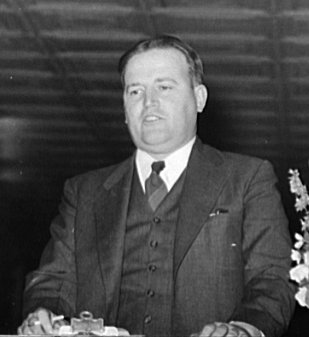
- Jimmy Morrison in 1939

Member of the U.S. House of Representatives from Louisiana's 6th district
- In office January 3, 1943 – January 3, 1967
- Preceded by: Jared Y. Sanders Jr.
- Succeeded by: John Rarick

Personal details
- Born: James Hobson Morrison; December 8, 1908 Hammond, Louisiana, U.S.
- Died: July 20, 2000 (aged 91) Hammond, Louisiana, U.S.
- Resting place: Episcopal Church Cemetery in Hammond, Louisiana
- Party: Democratic
- Spouse: Marjorie Abbey Morrison (married 1940–2000, his death)
- Children: 2
- Education: Tulane University School of Law
- Occupation: Attorney

James Hobson Morrison (December 8, 1908 – July 20, 2000) was an American lawyer and politician who served twelve terms as a Democratic member of the United States House of Representatives from Louisiana from 1943 to 1967.

== Early life and career ==
James H. Morrison was born in Hammond, Louisiana on December 8, 1908. He attended the public schools and graduated from the Tulane University School of Law in New Orleans in 1934. He passed the bar and began a private legal practice in Hammond. He supported better treatment for strawberry pickers and founded a labor newspaper.

=== Gubernatorial campaigns ===
He ran unsuccessfully for governor in 1939 and again in 1944.

== Tenure in Congress ==
In 1942, he ran as a Democrat for a seat in the U.S. House, seeking to represent Louisiana's 6th congressional district. He won election and would serve in Congress for the next 24 years.

He was initially assigned to serve on five committees, but after only a few days he stepped down from those committees because they dealt with issues less directly impactful to his district than the agricultural concerns he sought to represent. He quickly gained a reputation as a populist and supporter of federal highway funding in his district.

He was a delegate to the Democratic National Conventions in both 1956 and 1960.

Based on certain criteria, Morrison developed a mostly liberal voting record during the course of his congressional career.

=== Civil rights ===
In 1956, Morrison was a signatory of the Southern Manifesto. He voted against the Civil Rights Acts of 1957, 1960, and 1964. However, in 1965, he voted for the Voting Rights Act, which many believe cost him his seat.

== Defeat and later career ==
In 1966, he was defeated in the Democratic primary election by Louisiana judge John R. Rarick.

After leaving Congress, he returned to Hammond to take up his law practice. He became a prolific fundraiser and supporter of Southeastern Louisiana University, to which he had also steered federal contracts during his time in office.

== Death ==
James Morrison died in Hammond on July 20, 2000, following a series of health problems, including two heart attacks and a stroke. His body is interred at Episcopal Church Cemetery in Hammond.

He was survived by his wife of 60 years, Marjorie Abbey Morrison and their two sons, James Jr. and Benjamin.

U.S. House of Representatives
Preceded by Jared Y. Sanders Jr.	Member of the U.S. House of Representatives from Louisiana's 6th congressional district 1943–1967	Succeeded by John Rarick
