= 2008 United States House of Representatives election ratings =

Predictions for select races in the 2008 U.S. House elections

The 2008 United States House of Representatives elections were held on November 4, 2008, with early voting taking place in some states in the weeks preceding that date. Voters chose representatives from all 435 congressional districts across each of the 50 U.S. states. Non-voting delegates from the District of Columbia and all five inhabited U.S. territories were also elected. These elections took place alongside the election of Democratic Senator Barack Obama of Illinois as President of the United States. The winners served in the 111th United States Congress, with seats apportioned among the states based on the 2000 United States census. On Election Day, Democrats had held a House majority since January 2007 as a result of the 2006 elections.

== Forecasts ==
On April 8, 2008, analyst Stuart Rothenberg of The Rothenberg Political Report stated that the fight for the House would be a "one-sided battle, with Democrats having most of the targets." He points to a list of one dozen seats (out of all 435 seats in the House) that are most likely to change hands, of those twelve, ten are open seats, seats which Republicans won by 3% or less in 2006 or otherwise endangered GOP seats. In May 2007, conservative columnist Robert Novak wrote that he believed there were at least a few House seats that were won by Democrats in 2006 "solely because of GOP corruption," and that such seats would be "the most likely to return to the Republican column in 2008". He also said,

a continued sour mood over the Iraq War could produce another massive Republican defeat in 2008 that makes 2006 look tame by comparison. Republicans in Washington generally concede that the continued presence of U.S. troops in Iraq by next November could mean disaster for the party.

Novak qualified this by saying that in "previous elections, major House gains by either party have always been followed by losses in the next election".

InTrade.com, the only betting site that offered odds on control of the House, put the likelihood of the Democrats retaining control at about 90% as of October 2008. There have been three special elections for open Republican seats, IL-14 (formerly held by Dennis Hastert), LA-06 (formerly held by Richard Baker) and MS-01 (formerly held by Roger Wicker). Democrats won all three elections. After the MS-01 loss, Ron Gunzburger wrote, "GOP insiders in DC now privately acknowledge the Democratic victory in this seat likely foreshadows a dismal general election ahead for congressional Republicans."

== Election ratings ==
The following table rates the competitiveness of selected races from around the country according to noted political analysts. Races not included should be considered safe for the incumbent's party.

District	CPVI	Incumbent	Previous result	Cook November 7, 2008	Rothenberg November 2, 2008	Sabato November 3, 2008	RCP November 7, 2008	CQ Politics November 6, 2008	Winner
Alabama 2	R+13	Terry Everett (R) (retiring)	69.54% R	Tossup	Tossup	Lean R	Tossup	Tossup	Bobby Bright (D)
Alabama 3	R+4	Mike Rogers (R)	59.47% R	Likely R	Safe R	Safe R	Safe R	Likely R	Mike Rogers (R)
Alabama 5	R+6	Bud Cramer (D) (retiring)	98.25% D	Tossup	Tossup	Lean D	Lean D	Tossup	Parker Griffith (D)
Alaska at-large	R+14	Don Young (R)	56.71% R	Tossup	Likely D (flip)	Lean D (flip)	Lean D (flip)	Lean D (flip)	Don Young (R)
Arizona 1	R+2	Rick Renzi (R) (retiring)	51.75% R	Likely D (flip)	Likely D (flip)	Lean D (flip)	Lean D (flip)	Lean D (flip)	Ann Kirkpatrick (D)
Arizona 3	R+6	John Shadegg (R)	59.27% R	Lean R	Likely R	Lean R	Lean R	Lean R	John Shadegg (R)
Arizona 5	R+4	Harry Mitchell (D)	50.41% D	Likely D	Safe D	Lean D	Safe D	Lean D	Harry Mitchell (D)
Arizona 8	R+1	Gabby Giffords (D)	54.26% D	Likely D	Safe D	Lean D	Safe D	Lean D	Gabby Giffords (D)
California 3	R+7	Dan Lungren (R)	59.48% R	Likely R	Likely R	Safe R	Safe R	Likely R	Dan Lungren (R)
California 4	R+11	John Doolittle (R) (retiring)	49.05% R	Tossup	Tossup	Lean D (flip)	Tossup	Tossup	Tom McClintock (R)
California 11	R+3	Jerry McNerney (D)	53.27% D	Lean D	Lean D	Lean D	Safe D	Likely D	Jerry McNerney (D)
California 26	R+4	David Dreier (R)	56.95% R	Likely R	Safe R	Safe R	Safe R	Likely R	David Dreier (R)
California 45	R+3	Mary Bono (R)	60.66% R	Likely R	Safe R	Safe R	Safe R	Safe R	Mary Bono (R)
California 46	R+6	Dana Rohrabacher (R)	59.56% R	Likely R	Likely R	Safe R	Safe R	Likely R	Dana Rohrabacher (R)
California 50	R+5	Brian Bilbray (R)	53.14% R	Lean R	Safe R	Lean R	Safe R	Likely R	Brian Bilbray (R)
Colorado 4	R+9	Marilyn Musgrave (R)	45.61% R	Tossup	Lean D (flip)	Lean D (flip)	Tossup	Lean D (flip)	Betsy Markey (D)
Connecticut 2	D+8	Joe Courtney (D)	50.02% D	Safe D	Safe D	Safe D	Safe D	Likely D	Joe Courtney (D)
Connecticut 4	D+5	Chris Shays (R)	50.96% R	Tossup	Tilt D (flip)	Lean D (flip)	Tossup	Tossup	Jim Himes (D)
Connecticut 5	D+4	Chris Murphy (D)	56.46% D	Safe D	Safe D	Safe D	Safe D	Lean D	Chris Murphy (D)
Florida 8	R+3	Ric Keller (R)	52.80% R	Tossup	Lean D (flip)	Lean D (flip)	Tossup	Lean D (flip)	Alan Grayson (D)
Florida 13	R+4	Vern Buchanan (R)	50.08% R	Likely R	Likely R	Lean R	Safe R	Lean R	Vern Buchanan (R)
Florida 15	R+4	Dave Weldon (R)	56.28% R	Safe R	Safe R	Safe R	Safe R	Likely R	Dave Weldon (R)
Florida 16	R+2	Tim Mahoney (D)	49.55% D	Likely R (flip)	Likely R (flip)	Lean R (flip)	Lean R (flip)	Lean R (flip)	Tom Rooney (R)
Florida 18	R+4	Ileana Ros-Lehtinen (R)	62.15% R	Likely R	Safe R	Safe R	Safe R	Likely R	Ileana Ros-Lehtinen (R)
Florida 21	R+6	Lincoln Díaz-Balart (R)	59.47% R	Tossup	Tossup	Lean R	Tossup	Lean R	Lincoln Díaz-Balart (R)
Florida 22	D+4	Ron Klein (D)	50.88% D	Safe D	Safe D	Safe D	Safe D	Likely D	Ron Klein (D)
Florida 24	R+3	Tom Feeney (R)	57.94% R	Lean D (flip)	Likely D (flip)	Lean D (flip)	Lean D (flip)	Lean D (flip)	Suzanne Kosmas (D)
Florida 25	R+4	Mario Díaz-Balart (R)	58.47% R	Tossup	Tilt R	Lean D (flip)	Tossup	Lean R	Mario Díaz-Balart (R)
Georgia 8	R+8	Jim Marshall (D)	50.55% D	Lean D	Tilt D	Lean D	Lean D	Lean D	Jim Marshall (D)
Georgia 12	D+2	John Barrow (D)	50.30% D	Safe D	Safe D	Lean D	Safe D	Likely D	John Barrow (D)
Georgia 13	D+10	David Scott (D)	69.24% D	Safe D	Safe D	Safe D	Safe D	Likely D	David Scott (D)
Idaho 1	R+19	Bill Sali (R)	49.94% R	Lean D (flip)	Tilt D (flip)	Lean D (flip)	Tossup	Tossup	Walt Minnick (D)
Illinois 6	R+3	Peter Roskam (R)	51.35% R	Likely R	Safe R	Safe R	Safe R	Likely R	Peter Roskam (R)
Illinois 8	R+5	Melissa Bean (D)	50.90% D	Safe D	Safe D	Lean D	Safe D	Likely D	Melissa Bean (D)
Illinois 10	D+4	Mark Kirk (R)	53.38% R	Tossup	Tilt R	Lean D (flip)	Tossup	Tossup	Mark Kirk (R)
Illinois 11	R+1	Jerry Weller (R) (retiring)	55.10% R	Lean D (flip)	Lean D (flip)	Lean D (flip)	Lean D (flip)	Lean D (flip)	Debbie Halvorson (D)
Illinois 13	R+5	Judy Biggert (R)	58.34% R	Likely R	Safe R	Safe R	Safe R	Likely R	Judy Biggert (R)
Illinois 14	R+5	Bill Foster (D)	52.53% D	Likely D	Safe D	Lean D	Safe D	Likely D	Bill Foster (D)
Illinois 18	R+5	Ray LaHood (R) (retiring)	67.28% R	Safe R	Safe R	Lean R	Safe R	Likely R	Aaron Schock (R)
Indiana 3	R+16	Mark Souder (R)	54.28% R	Lean R	Likely R	Lean R	Lean R	Lean R	Mark Souder (R)
Indiana 8	R+9	Brad Ellsworth (D)	61.02% D	Safe D	Safe D	Lean D	Safe D	Safe D	Brad Ellsworth (D)
Indiana 9	R+7	Baron Hill (D)	50.02% D	Likely D	Safe D	Lean D	Safe D	Likely D	Baron Hill (D)
Iowa 4	Even	Tom Latham (R)	57.21% R	Likely R	Safe R	Lean R	Safe R	Likely R	Tom Latham (R)
Kansas 2	R+7	Nancy Boyda (D)	50.60% D	Lean D	Tilt D	Lean D	Lean R (flip)	Tossup	Lynn Jenkins (R)
Kansas 3	R+4	Dennis Moore (D)	56.61% D	Likely D	Safe D	Lean D	Safe D	Likely D	Dennis Moore (D)
Kentucky 2	R+13	Ron Lewis (R) (retiring)	55.41% R	Tossup	Tossup	Lean R	Lean R	Lean R	Brett Guthrie (R)
Kentucky 3	D+2	John Yarmuth (D)	50.62% D	Likely D	Safe D	Lean D	Lean D	Likely D	John Yarmuth (D)
Louisiana 1	R+18	Steve Scalise (R)	75.13% R	Safe R	Safe R	Safe R	Safe R	Likely R	Steve Scalise (R)
Louisiana 2	D+28	William Jefferson (D)	56.55% D	Safe D	Safe D	Safe D	Safe D	Safe D	Joseph Cao (R)
Louisiana 4	R+7	Jim McCrery (R) (retiring)	57.40% R	Tossup	Tossup	Lean R	Lean R	Tossup	John Fleming (R)
Louisiana 6	R+7	Don Cazayoux (D)	49.20% D	Tossup	Tossup	Lean D	Lean D	Tossup	Bill Cassidy (R)
Louisiana 7	R+7	Charles Boustany (R)	70.70% R	Likely R	Safe R	Lean R	Safe R	Likely R	Charles Boustany (R)
Maine 1	D+6	Tom Allen (D) (retiring) (Note: Retired to run for senate)	60.84% D	Safe D	Safe D	Safe D	Safe D	Likely D	Chellie Pingree (D)
Maryland 1	R+10	Wayne Gilchrest (R) (lost renomination)	68.86% R	Tossup	Tossup	Lean R	Lean R	Tossup	Frank Kratovil (D)
Michigan 7	R+2	Tim Walberg (R)	50.47% R	Tossup	Tossup	Lean D (flip)	Tossup	Tossup	Mark Schauer (D)
Michigan 8	R+2	Mike Rogers (R)	55.27% R	Likely R	Safe R	Safe R	Safe R	Safe R	Mike Rogers (R)
Michigan 9	Even	Joe Knollenberg (R)	51.56% R	Tossup	Lean D (flip)	Lean D (flip)	Tossup	Lean D (flip)	Gary Peters (D)
Michigan 11	R+1	Thaddeus McCotter (R)	54.05% R	Likely R	Safe R	Safe R	Safe R	Safe R	Thaddeus McCotter (R)
Minnesota 1	R+1	Tim Walz (D)	52.73% D	Likely D	Safe D	Lean D	Safe D	Likely D	Tim Walz (D)
Minnesota 2	R+3	John Kline (R)	56.19% R	Likely R	Safe R	Safe R	Safe R	Likely R	John Kline (R)
Minnesota 3	R+1	Jim Ramstad (R) (retiring)	64.85% R	Tossup	Tilt D (flip)	Lean R	Tossup	Tossup	Erik Paulsen (R)
Minnesota 6	R+5	Michele Bachmann (R)	50.05% R	Tossup	Tilt D (flip)	Lean D (flip)	Tossup	Tossup	Michele Bachmann (R)
Mississippi 1	R+10	Travis Childers (D)	53.78% D	Likely D	Safe D	Lean D	Lean D	Lean D	Travis Childers (D)
Missouri 6	R+5	Sam Graves (R)	61.64% R	Lean R	Safe R	Lean R	Lean R	Lean R	Sam Graves (R)
Missouri 9	R+7	Kenny Hulshof (R) (retiring)	61.45% R	Tossup	Tilt R	Lean R	Lean R	Lean R	Blaine Luetkemeyer (R)
Nebraska 2	R+9	Lee Terry (R)	54.66% R	Tossup	Tilt D (flip)	Lean R	Safe R	Lean R	Lee Terry (R)
Nevada 2	R+8	Dean Heller (R)	50.35% R	Lean R	Likely R	Lean R	Safe R	Lean R	Dean Heller (R)
Nevada 3	D+1	Jon Porter (R)	48.46% R	Tossup	Tilt D (flip)	Lean D (flip)	Tossup	Tossup	Dina Titus (D)
New Hampshire 1	Even	Carol Shea-Porter (D)	51.27% D	Tossup	Tilt D	Lean D	Tossup	Tossup	Carol Shea-Porter (D)
New Hampshire 2	D+3	Paul Hodes (D)	52.71% D	Safe D	Safe D	Lean D	Safe D	Likely D	Paul Hodes (D)
New Jersey 3	D+3	Jim Saxton (R) (retiring)	58.40% R	Tossup	Tilt D (flip)	Lean D (flip)	Tossup	Tossup	John Adler (D)
New Jersey 5	R+8	Scott Garrett (R)	54.91% R	Likely R	Safe R	Lean R	Safe R	Likely R	Scott Garrett (R)
New Jersey 7	R+1	Mike Ferguson (R) (retiring)	49.43% R	Tossup	Tossup	Lean D (flip)	Tossup	Tossup	Leonard Lance (R)
New Mexico 1	D+2	Heather Wilson (R) (retiring)	50.20% R	Lean D (flip)	Lean D (flip)	Lean D (flip)	Lean D (flip)	Tossup	Martin Heinrich (D)
New Mexico 2	R+6	Steve Pearce (R) (retiring)	59.42% R	Tossup	Lean D (flip)	Lean D (flip)	Tossup	Tossup	Harry Teague (D)
New York 13	D+1	Vito Fossella (R) (retiring)	56.79% R	Likely D (flip)	Likely D (flip)	Lean D (flip)	Lean D (flip)	Likely D (flip)	Michael McMahon (D)
New York 19	R+1	John Hall (D)	51.21% D	Likely D	Safe D	Lean D	Safe D	Likely D	John Hall (D)
New York 20	R+3	Kirsten Gillibrand (D)	53.10% D	Likely D	Safe D	Lean D	Safe D	Lean D	Kirsten Gillibrand (D)
New York 24	R+1	Mike Arcuri (D)	53.94% D	Likely D	Safe D	Lean D	Safe D	Likely D	Mike Arcuri (D)
New York 25	D+3	James Walsh (R) (retiring)	50.79% R	Likely D (flip)	Likely D (flip)	Lean D (flip)	Lean D (flip)	Likely D (flip)	Dan Maffei (D)
New York 26	R+3	Thomas Reynolds (R) (retiring)	51.98% R	Tossup	Tilt R	Lean R	Safe R	Lean R	Chris Lee (R)
New York 29	R+5	Randy Kuhl (R)	51.46% R	Tossup	Tilt D (flip)	Lean D (flip)	Tossup	Lean D (flip)	Eric Massa (D)
North Carolina 5	R+15	Virginia Foxx (R)	57.16% R	Likely R	Safe R	Safe R	Safe R	Safe R	Virginia Foxx (R)
North Carolina 8	R+3	Robin Hayes (R)	50.14% R	Tossup	Lean D (flip)	Lean D (flip)	Tossup	Tossup	Larry Kissell (D)
North Carolina 10	R+15	Patrick McHenry (R)	61.80% R	Safe R	Safe R	Safe R	Safe R	Likely R	Patrick McHenry (R)
Ohio 1	R+1	Steve Chabot (R)	52.25% R	Tossup	Tossup	Lean D (flip)	Tossup	Tossup	Steve Driehaus (D)
Ohio 2	R+13	Jean Schmidt (R)	50.45% R	Lean R	Lean R	Lean R	Lean R	Lean R	Jean Schmidt (R)
Ohio 7	R+6	Dave Hobson (R) (retiring)	60.62% R	Likely R	Safe R	Safe R	Safe R	Likely R	Steve Austria (R)
Ohio 12	R+1	Pat Tiberi (R)	57.30% R	Likely R	Safe R	Safe R	Safe R	Likely R	Pat Tiberi (R)
Ohio 14	R+2	Steve LaTourette (R)	57.55% R	Likely R	Safe R	Safe R	Safe R	Likely R	Steve LaTourette (R)
Ohio 15	R+1	Deborah Pryce (R) (retiring)	50.20% R	Lean D (flip)	Tilt D (flip)	Lean D (flip)	Tossup	Lean D (flip)	Mary Jo Kilroy (D)
Ohio 16	R+4	Ralph Regula (R) (retiring)	58.34% R	Lean D (flip)	Likely D (flip)	Lean D (flip)	Lean D (flip)	Lean D (flip)	John Boccieri (D)
Ohio 18	R+6	Zack Space (D)	62.06% D	Likely D	Safe D	Lean D	Safe D	Likely D	Zack Space (D)
Oklahoma 1	R+13	John Sullivan (R)	63.64% R	Likely R	Safe R	Safe R	Safe R	Safe R	John Sullivan (R)
Oklahoma 4	R+13	Tom Cole (R)	64.61% R	Likely R	Safe R	Safe R	Safe R	Safe R	Tom Cole (R)
Oregon 5	D+1	Darlene Hooley (D) (retiring)	53.99% D	Likely D	Safe D	Lean D	Safe D	Likely D	Kurt Schrader (D)
Pennsylvania 3	R+2	Phil English (R)	53.64% R	Tossup	Tilt D (flip)	Lean D (flip)	Tossup	Tossup	Kathy Dahlkemper (D)
Pennsylvania 4	R+3	Jason Altmire (D)	51.93% D	Likely D	Safe D	Lean D	Safe D	Likely D	Jason Altmire (D)
Pennsylvania 5	R+10	John Peterson (R) (retiring)	60.09% R	Likely R	Safe R	Safe R	Safe R	Safe R	Glenn Thompson (R)
Pennsylvania 6	D+2	Jim Gerlach (R)	50.66% R	Likely R	Safe R	Lean R	Safe R	Likely R	Jim Gerlach (R)
Pennsylvania 8	D+3	Patrick Murphy (D)	50.30% D	Safe D	Safe D	Lean D	Safe D	Likely D	Patrick Murphy (D)
Pennsylvania 10	R+8	Chris Carney (D)	52.95% D	Lean D	Likely D	Lean D	Tossup	Lean D	Chris Carney (D)
Pennsylvania 11	D+5	Paul Kanjorski (D)	72.47% D	Tossup	Tossup	Lean R (flip)	Lean R (flip)	Tossup	Paul Kanjorski (D)
Pennsylvania 12	D+5	John Murtha (D)	60.80% D	Lean D	Likely D	Lean D	Lean D	Lean D	John Murtha (D)
Pennsylvania 15	D+2	Charlie Dent (R)	53.57% R	Likely R	Safe R	Lean R	Safe R	Likely R	Charlie Dent (R)
Pennsylvania 18	R+2	Tim Murphy (R)	57.84% R	Likely R	Safe R	Lean R	Safe R	Likely R	Tim Murphy (R)
South Carolina 1	R+10	Henry Brown (R)	59.87% R	Lean R	Lean R	Lean R	Safe R	Lean R	Henry Brown (R)
South Carolina 2	R+9	Joe Wilson (R)	62.64% R	Likely R	Safe R	Safe R	Safe R	Likely R	Joe Wilson (R)
Texas 7	R+16	John Culberson (R)	59.19% R	Lean R	Likely R	Lean R	Safe R	Lean R	John Culberson (R)
Texas 10	R+16	Michael McCaul (R)	55.32% R	Lean R	Likely R	Lean R	Safe R	Lean R	Michael McCaul (R)
Texas 22	R+15	Nick Lampson (D)	51.79% D	Tossup	Lean R (flip)	Lean R (flip)	Lean R (flip)	Tossup	Pete Olson (R)
Texas 23	R+4	Ciro Rodriguez (D)	54.28% D	Likely D	Safe D	Lean D	Safe D	Lean D	Ciro Rodriguez (D)
Virginia 2	R+6	Thelma Drake (R)	51.27% R	Tossup	Tossup	Lean R	Lean R	Lean R	Glenn Nye (D)
Virginia 5	R+6	Virgil Goode (R)	59.11% R	Lean R	Lean R	Lean R	Lean R	Lean R	Tom Perriello (D)
Virginia 6	R+11	Bob Goodlatte (R)	75.09% R	Safe R	Safe R	Safe R	Lean R	Safe R	Bob Goodlatte (R)
Virginia 10	R+5	Frank Wolf (R)	57.32% R	Likely R	Safe R	Safe R	Safe R	Likely R	Frank Wolf (R)
Virginia 11	R+1	Tom Davis (R) (retiring)	55.45% R	Likely D (flip)	Likely D (flip)	Lean D (flip)	Lean D (flip)	Likely D (flip)	Gerry Connolly (D)
Washington 8	D+2	Dave Reichert (R)	51.46% R	Tossup	Tossup	Lean D (flip)	Tossup	Tossup	Dave Reichert (R)
West Virginia 2	R+5	Shelley Moore Capito (R)	57.18% R	Lean R	Likely R	Lean R	Safe R	Lean R	Shelley Moore Capito (R)
Wisconsin 8	R+4	Steve Kagen (D)	50.90% D	Lean D	Likely D	Lean D	Tossup	Lean D	Steve Kagen (D)
Wyoming at-large	R+19	Barbara Cubin (R) (retiring)	48.33% R	Lean R	Lean R	Lean R	Lean R	Tossup	Cynthia Lummis (R)
Overall				D - 226; R - 174; 35 tossups	D - 254; R - 167; 14 tossups	D - 262; R - 173	D - 237; R - 171; 26 tossups	D - 242; R - 167; 26 tossups	D - 257; R - 178
