= Frank P. Simoneaux =

American politician (1933–2024)

Louisiana State Representative for East Baton Rouge Parish
- In office 1972–1982
- Preceded by: Seven-member delegation: Irving R. Boudreaux; Richard E. Cheek; Carl V. Dawson; Laurence "Smokey" Delaroderie; Chris Faser, Jr.; Eugene McGehee; Lillian W. Walker
- Succeeded by: Carl Crane

Speaker Pro Tem of the Louisiana House of Representatives
- In office 1980–1982
- Preceded by: Kenneth J. Leithman
- Succeeded by: Raymond Laborde

Personal details
- Born: Frank Paul Simoneaux; October 30, 1933 Brusly, Louisiana, U.S.
- Died: May 8, 2024 (aged 90) Baton Rouge, Louisiana, U.S.
- Resting place: Resthaven Gardens in Baton Rouge
- Party: Democrat-turned-Independent
- Spouse: Marie "Marcy" Lancaster Simoneaux (1939-2025) (m. 1961)
- Children: F. Paul Simoneaux (wife Marie) Michelle Quinn (husband Michael); Rainier Simoneaux; Denis Simoneaux (wife Keisha) Mignonne Simoneaux (deceased)
- Education: Louisiana State University Law Center
- Occupation: Attorney

Frank Paul Simoneaux (October 30, 1933 – May 8, 2024) was an American lawyer and politician in Baton Rouge, Louisiana, who served as a Democrat from 1972 to 1982 in the Louisiana House of Representatives. From 1980 to 1982, Simoneaux was the House Speaker Pro Tem. He resigned from the House in 1982 with more than a year remaining in his third term to become Secretary of Natural Resources in the administration of Republican Governor David C. Treen.

== Life and career ==
Simoneaux was born in Brusly, West Baton Rouge Parish on October 30, 1933, to Henry and Ann Simoneaux. He graduated in 1954 from Louisiana State University in Baton Rouge. After he served for two years in the United States Army, he resumed his studies and in 1961 was named as a Phi Delta Phi honor graduate of Louisiana State University School of Law. After law school, he returned to active duty, was promoted to captain, and transferred to the Judge Advocate General Corps. Simoneaux spent thirty years of Reserve and Louisiana National Guard service and retired with the rank of colonel and as state judge advocate.

Simoneaux sponsored and obtained passage of bills that modernized lobbying reform, marriage equality, oil and mineral rights reform, and the removal of all unconstitutional Jim Crow-era state laws. The political magazine Gris Gris named Simoneaux as "Best Legislator" for four consecutive years. His obituary quotes, "If there's any consensus in the House at all, it seems to be that Simoneaux ranks head and shoulders above everyone else."

In the first administration of Governor Bobby Jindal, Simoneaux was chosen by his colleagues as the chairman of the Louisiana Ethics Commission. Simoneaux was listed in December 2014 by the office of then Louisiana Secretary of State Tom Schedler as an Independent voter.

Simoneaux died May 8, 2024, at the age of 90.

Preceded by Seven-member delegation: Irving R. Boudreaux; Richard E. Cheek; Carl V. Dawson; Laurence "Smokey" Delaroderie; Chris Faser, Jr. Eugene McGehee Lillian W. Walker	Louisiana State Representative for East Baton Rouge Parish; 1972–1982; Served alongside: eight other members	Succeeded by Carl Crane
Preceded by Kenneth J. Leithman	Speaker Pro Tem of the Louisiana House of Representatives; 1980–1982	Succeeded by Raymond Laborde
