= 2008 Louisiana's 6th congressional district special election =

- May 3, 2008

Louisiana's 6th congressional district
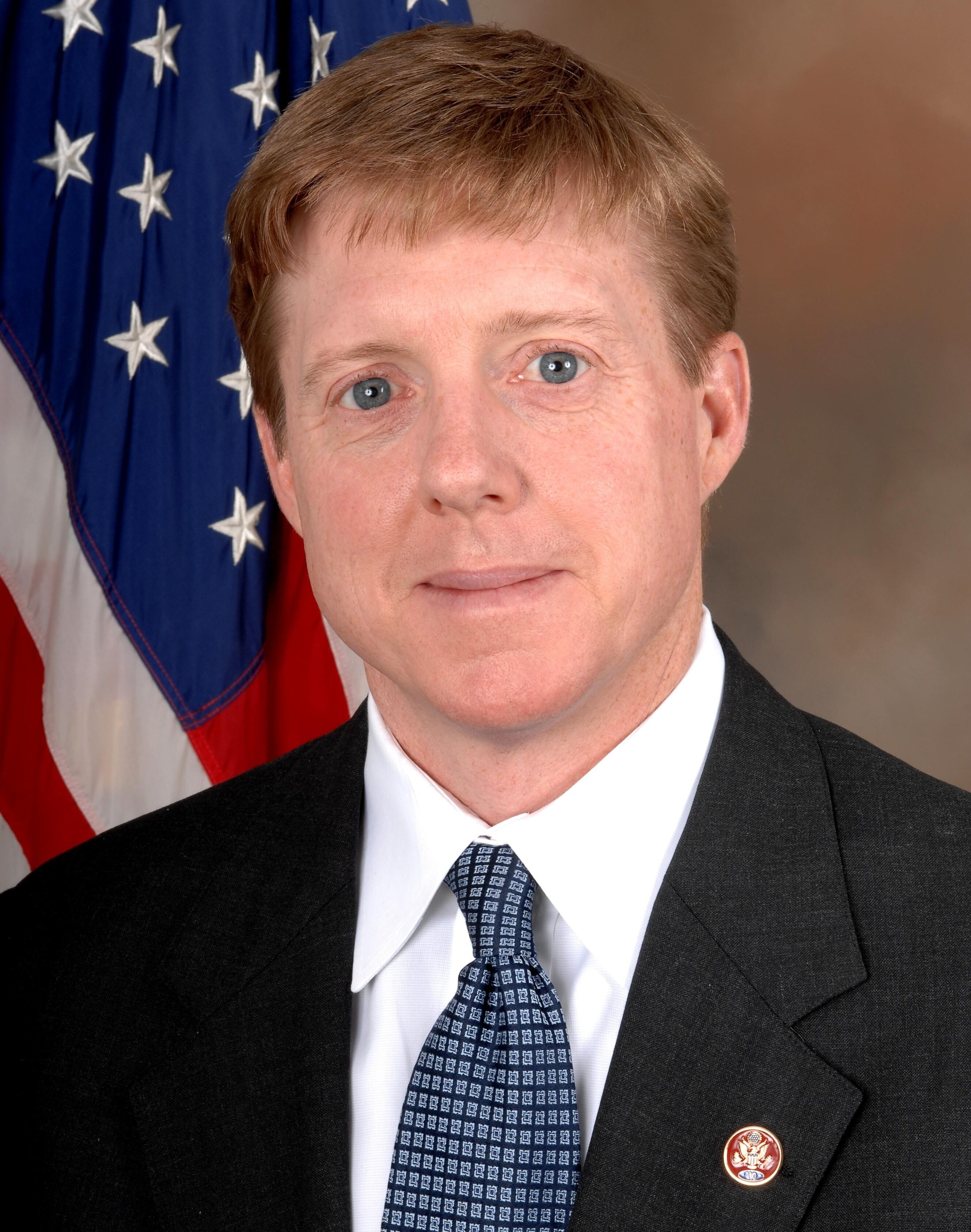

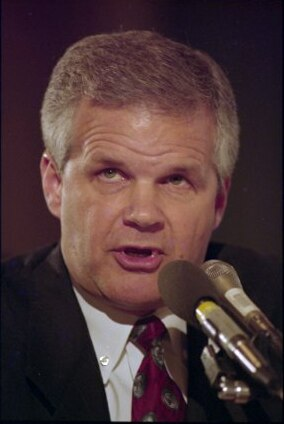
Nominee	Don Cazayoux	Woody Jenkins
Party	Democratic	Republican
Popular vote	49,702	46,741
Percentage	49.20%	46.27%
- Parish results Cazayoux: 50–60% 60–70% 70–80% Jenkins: 40–50% 60–70%
U.S. Representative before election
Richard Baker
Republican
Elected U.S. Representative
Don Cazayoux
Democratic

The February 2, 2008 resignation of Republican Richard Baker triggered a special election for Louisiana's 6th district. In anticipation of this election, party qualifying occurred before Baker's resignation. The timeline mirrored that of the 2008 special election for the 1st congressional district. The two elections were the first Louisiana congressional elections not based on Louisiana's jungle primary system since the 1970s.

Democrat Don Cazayoux won the 6th district election, defeating Republican Woody Jenkins by three percentage points, as well as two independent candidates and a member of the Constitution Party. He was sworn in on May 6, switching the party affiliation of the seat. (This was the second time such a party switch occurred due to a special election during the 110th Congress.)

== Democratic primary ==
=== Candidates ===
- Don Cazayoux, Louisiana State Representative
- Michael L. Jackson, Louisiana State Representative
- Jason DeCuir, attorney, former candidate for the State Senate
- Andy Kopplin, former Chief of Staff to Governors Foster and Blanco, former LRA Executive Director
- Joe Delatte, electrician

=== Results ===
Democratic primary results
Party	Candidate	Votes	%
Democratic	Don Cazayoux	16,636	34.93
Democratic	Michael L. Jackson	12,941	27.17
Democratic	Jason DeCuir	8,824	18.53
Democratic	Andy Kopplin	8,211	17.24
Democratic	Joe Delatte	1,020	2.14
Total votes		47,632	100.00

Democratic primary runoff results
Party	Candidate	Votes	%
Democratic	Don Cazayoux	19,806	56.79
Democratic	Michael Jackson	15,068	43.21
Total votes		34,874	100.00

== Republican primary ==
=== Candidates ===
- Woody Jenkins, former Louisiana State Representative, candidate for the United States Senate in 1996, newspaper editor
- Laurinda L. Calongne, lobbyist and owner of Robert Rose Consulting, a government relations firm.
- Michael Cloonan, United States Navy veteran, businessman
- Paul Sawyer, former aide to former Congressman Richard Baker

=== Results ===
Republican primary results
Party	Candidate	Votes	%
Republican	Woody Jenkins	14,900	49.87
Republican	Laurinda L. Calongne	7,609	25.47
Republican	Paul Sawyer	6,939	23.23
Republican	Michael Cloonan	427	1.43
Total votes		29,875	100.00

Republican primary runoff results
Party	Candidate	Votes	%
Republican	Woody Jenkins	15,179	61.94
Republican	Laurinda L. Calongne	9,327	38.06
Total votes		24,506	100.00

== Constitution Party ==
- Randall T. Hayes, critic of plurality voting, proponent of instant runoff voting

== Independent candidates ==
- Peter J. Aranyosi
- Ashley Casey, New media consultant, former press secretary to Gov. Buddy Roemer and Congresswoman Sue Kelly

== General election ==
=== Results ===
Louisiana's 6th congressional district special election, 2008
Party	Candidate	Votes	%
Democratic	Don Cazayoux	49,702	49.20
Republican	Woody Jenkins	46,741	46.27
Independent	Ashley Casey	3,718	3.68
Independent	Peter J. Aranyosi	448	0.44
Constitution	Randall T. Hayes	402	0.40
Total votes		101,011	100.00
Democratic gain from Republican			

=== Parish results ===
Vote breakdown by parish
	Don Cazayoux Democrat		Woody Jenkins Republican		Total
Parish	Votes	%	Votes	%	Votes
Ascension	1,845	34.09%	3,297	60.92%	5,412
East Baton Rouge	33,635	51.27%	28,759	43.84%	65,598
East Feliciana	1,581	47.24%	1,599	47.77%	3,347
Iberville	1,439	55.07%	787	44.02%	2,327
Livingston	3,962	29.12%	9,126	67.07%	13,607
Pointe Coupee	2,519	78.84%	639	20.00%	3,195
St. Helena	969	59.16%	618	37.73%	1,638
West Baton Rouge	2,610	67.70%	1,127	29.23%	3,855
West Feliciana	1,143	56.08%	794	38.96%	2,038

== See also ==
- Louisiana's 1st congressional district special election, 2008
- List of special elections to the United States House of Representatives
- United States House of Representatives elections in Louisiana, 2008
- Illinois's 14th congressional district special election, 2008
- Mississippi's 1st congressional district special election, 2008
