= Carmouche =

Carmouche is a surname. Notable people with the surname include:

- Edward M. Carmouche (1921–1990), American attorney and politician
- Liz Carmouche (born 1984), American mixed martial arts fighter
- Paul Carmouche (born 1943), American lawyer
- Pierre Carmouche (1797–1868), French playwright and chansonnier
