= Michael Jackson (Louisiana politician) =

American politician

Michael L. Jackson

Member of the Louisiana House of Representatives from the 61st district
- In office January 10, 2000 – January 9, 2012
- Preceded by: Raymond Jetson
- Succeeded by: Alfred C. Williams

Personal details
- Born: September 22, 1965 (age 60)
- Party: Democratic (until 2008, 2011–present); Independent (2008–2011)
- Education: Southern University (B.A., J.D.)
- Occupation: Attorney

Michael L. Jackson (born September 22, 1965) is a Democratic politician and attorney from Louisiana who served as a member of the Louisiana House of Representatives from the 61st district from 2000 to 2012. He ran for Congress from the 6th congressional district in 2008, losing in the Democratic primary in the special election to Don Cazayoux, and as an independent in the general election.

== Early career ==
Jackson attended Southern University, where he graduated with his bachelor's degree and Juris Doctor.

== Louisiana House of Representatives ==
Jackson was elected to the Louisiana House of Representatives from the 61st district in 1999, winning 56 percent of the vote. He was re-elected unopposed in 2003. He was re-elected in 2007 with 67 percent of the vote.

== 2008 congressional campaign ==
In 2008, following the resignation of Republican Congressman Richard Baker, Jackson announced that he would run in the special election to succeed him. Jackson placed second in the Democratic primary, receiving 27 percent of the vote to State Representative Don Cazayoux's 35 percent, and they advanced to a runoff election. Cazayoux ultimately won the nomination over Jackson, receiving 57 percent of the vote to Jackson's 43 percent.

Following Cazayoux's victory in the special election, Jackson announced that he would challenge Cazayoux in the regular election for a full term as an independent candidate, citing the national party's support for Cazayoux over him in the primary. Jackson was viewed as a spoiler candidate, and received financial support from Lane Grigsby, a major contributor to Republican State Senator Bill Cassidy, Cazayoux's Republican opponent. Cassidy ultimately defeated Cazayoux and Jackson, winning 48 percent of the vote to Cazayoux's 40 percent and Jackson's 12 percent.

== 2011 Louisiana State Senate campaign ==
In 2011, Jackson was term-limited and unable to seek a fourth term in the State House, and instead opted to run for the State Senate, challenging incumbent Democratic State Senator Yvonne Dorsey-Colomb for re-election. Jackson argued that Dorsey-Colomb had "failed" in representing the area. Dorsey-Colomb ultimately defeated Jackson by a wide margin, winning 58 percent of the vote to his 28 percent.
