= 2008 United States House of Representatives elections in Louisiana =

- November 4, 2008

All 7 Louisiana seats to the United States House of Representatives
| | Majority party | Minority party |
|---|---|---|
| Party | Republican | Democratic |
| Last election | 5 | 2 |
| Seats before | 4 | 3 |
| Seats won | 6 | 1 |
| Seat change | ▲2 | ▼2 |
| Popular vote | 594,306 | 398,474 |
| Percentage | 56.81% | 38.09% |
| Swing | ▼6.48% | ▲4.33% |

Republican
40–50%
50–60%
60–70%
70–80%
90>%
Democratic
40–50%
50–60%
70–80%
90>%

The 2008 congressional elections in Louisiana to determine representation for the state of Louisiana in the United States House of Representatives occurred November 4, 2008. Louisiana has seven seats in the House, apportioned according to the 2000 United States census. Representatives are elected for two-year terms; those elected will serve in the 111th Congress from January 4, 2009, until January 3, 2011. The election coincided with the 2008 U.S. presidential election.

Unlike the 2006 elections, which were held under a jungle primary system, the 2008 elections used partisan primaries to decide general election nominees. The primary elections were to be held September 6, 2008, but were rescheduled for October 3, 2008 due to storm damage following Hurricane Gustav. The necessary party runoffs were held on November 4, the same date as the presidential election. The general election for the House races was held December 6.

== Overview ==
2008 United States House of Representatives elections in Louisiana
| Party | Votes | Percentage | Seats | +/– |
|---|---|---|---|---|
| Republican | 594,306 | 56.81% | 6 | +2 |
| Democratic | 398,474 | 38.09% | 1 | -2 |
| Independents | 50,964 | 4.87% | 0 | - |
| Green | 1,883 | 0.18% | 0 | - |
| Libertarian | 549 | 0.05% | 0 | - |
| Totals | 1,046,176 | 100.00% | 7 | — |

== District 1 ==
2008 Louisiana's 1st congressional district election
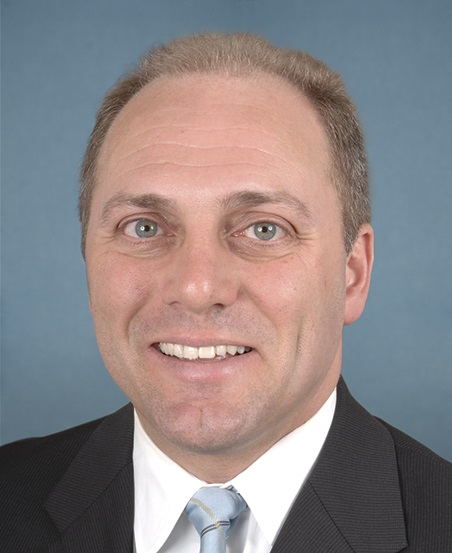

| Nominee | Steve Scalise | Jim Harlan |
| Party | Republican | Democratic |
| Popular vote | 189,168 | 98,839 |
| Percentage | 65.7% | 34.3% |
- Parish results Scalise: 50–60% 60–70% 70–80%
U.S. Representative before election
Steve Scalise (inc.)
Republican
Elected U.S. Representative
Steve Scalise
Republican

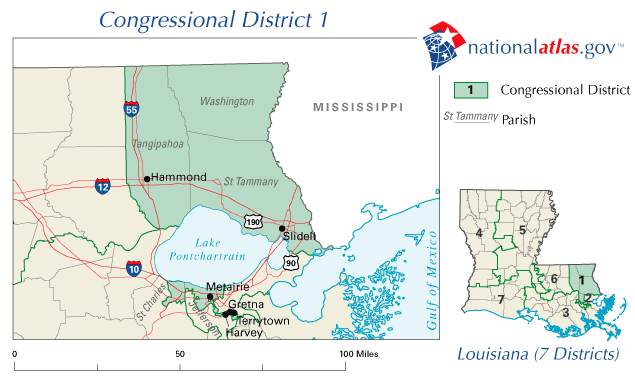

Incumbent Republican Congressman Steve Scalise, who was first elected in a special election to serve out the remainder of Governor Bobby Jindal's term, ran for re-election to a full term. He faced no opposition in the Republican primary, and was challenged by businessman Jim Harlan, the Democratic nominee. Harlan self-funded his campaign against Scalise, but ultimately lost to Scalise by a wide margin, receiving just 34 percent of the vote to Scalise's 66 percent.

=== Democratic primary ===
==== Candidates ====
- Jim Harlan, businessman
- Vinny Mendoza, organic farmer, perennial candidate

==== Results ====
Democratic primary results
| Party | Candidate | Votes | % |
|---|---|---|---|
| Democratic | Jim Harlan | 37,883 | 72.66% |
| Democratic | Vinny Mendoza | 14,254 | 27.34% |
| Total votes | | 52,137 | 100.00% |

=== General election ===
==== Predictions ====
| Source | Ranking | As of |
|---|---|---|
| The Cook Political Report | Safe R | November 6, 2008 |
| Rothenberg | Safe R | November 2, 2008 |
| Sabato's Crystal Ball | Safe R | November 6, 2008 |
| Real Clear Politics | Safe R | November 7, 2008 |
| CQ Politics | Likely R | November 6, 2008 |

==== Results ====
2008 Louisiana's 1st congressional district general election
| Party | Candidate | Votes | % |
|---|---|---|---|
| Republican | Steve Scalise (inc.) | 189,168 | 65.68% |
| Democratic | Jim Harlan | 98,839 | 34.32% |
| Total votes | | 288,007 | 100.00% |
| Republican hold | | | |

== District 2 ==
2008 Louisiana's 2nd congressional district election
- December 6, 2008
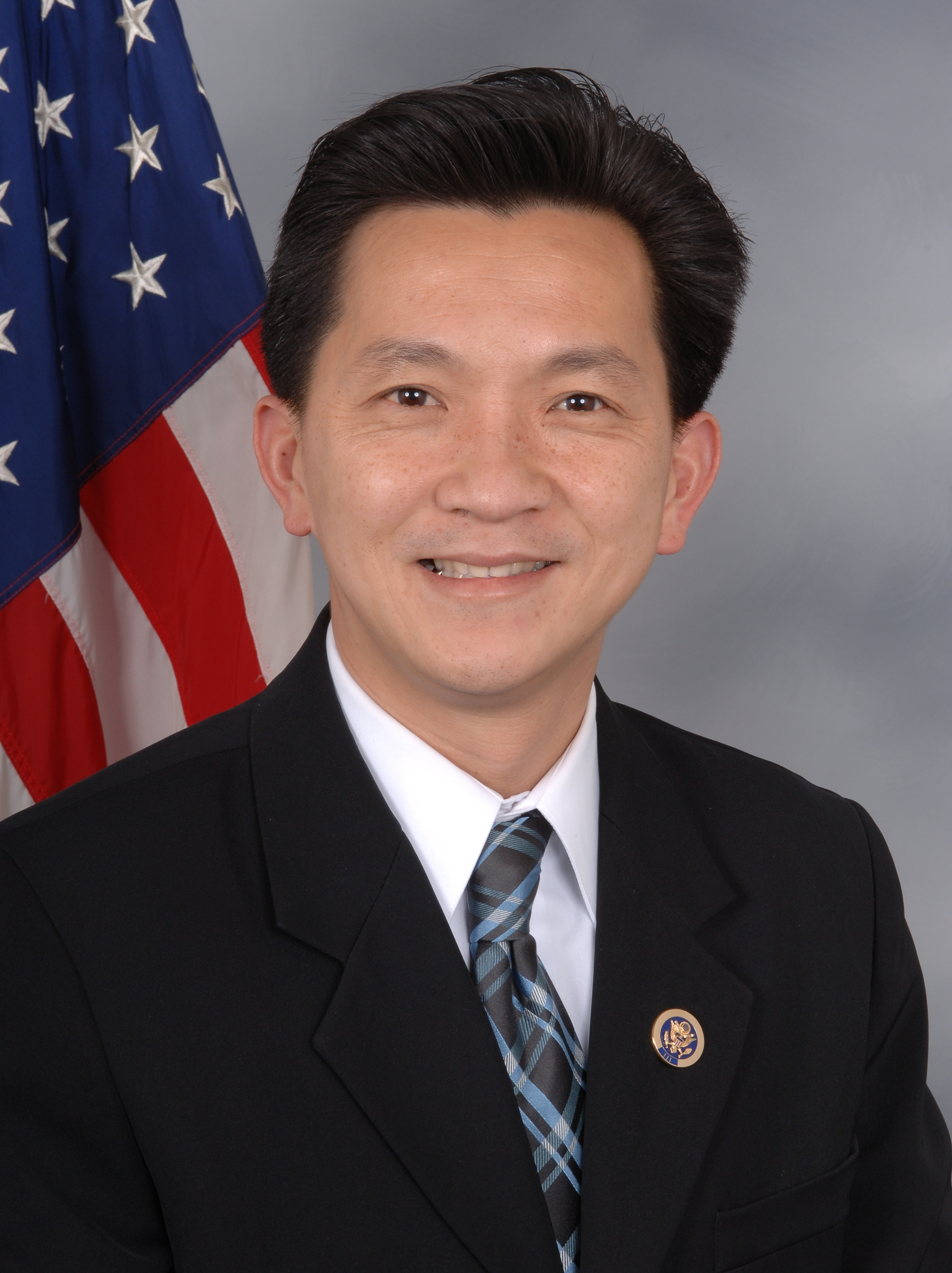

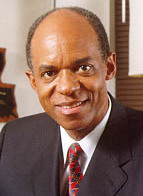
| Nominee | Joseph Cao | William J. Jefferson |
| Party | Republican | Democratic |
| Popular vote | 33,132 | 31,318 |
| Percentage | 49.54% | 46.83% |
- Parish results Cao: 60–70% Jefferson: 50–60%
U.S. Representative before election
William J. Jefferson
Democratic
Elected U.S. Representative
Joseph Cao
Republican

The district included nearly all of New Orleans and some of its suburbs, and is heavily Democratic: John Kerry won 75% of the vote here in 2004. CQ Politics forecasted the race as "Safe Democrat" for 9-term incumbent William Jefferson, but the Republican narrowly defeated him in an upset.

The primary runoff in this district was held on November 4 in place of the general election, with the general election moving to December 6. The investigation began in mid-2005, after an investor alleged $400,000 in bribes were paid through a company maintained in the name of his spouse and children. The money came from a tech company named iGate, Inc. of Louisville, Kentucky, and in return, it is alleged, Jefferson would help iGate's business. Jefferson was to persuade the U.S. Army to test iGate's broadband two-way technology and other iGate products; use his efforts to influence high-ranking officials in Nigeria, Ghana, and Cameroon; and meet with personnel of the Export-Import Bank of the United States, in order to facilitate potential financing for iGate business deals in those countries.

On July 30, 2005, Jefferson was videotaped by the FBI receiving $100,000 worth of $100 bills in a leather briefcase at the Ritz-Carlton hotel in Arlington, Virginia. Jefferson told an investor, Lori Mody, who was wearing a wire, that he would need to give Nigerian Vice President Atiku Abubakar $500,000 "as a motivating factor" to make sure they obtained contracts for iGate and Mody's company in Nigeria.

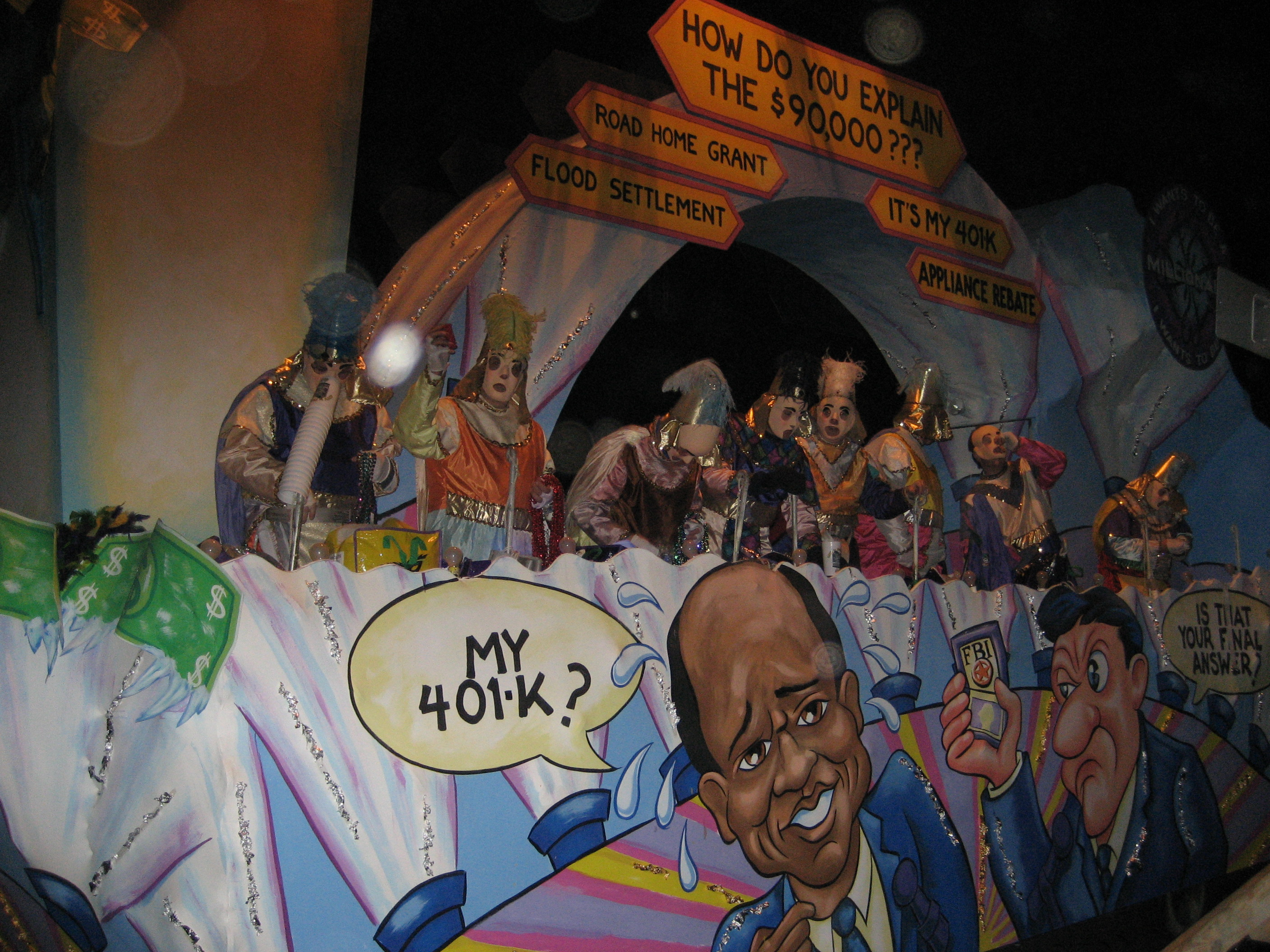
New Orleans Mardi Gras float satirizing "Dollar" Bill Jefferson

A few days later, on August 3, 2005, FBI agents raided Jefferson's home in Northeast Washington and, as noted in an 83-page affidavit filed to support a subsequent raid on his Congressional office, "found $90,000 of the cash in the freezer, in $10,000 increments wrapped in aluminum foil and stuffed inside frozen-food containers." Serial numbers found on the currency in the freezer matched serial numbers of funds given by the FBI to their informant.

Late on the night of May 20, 2006, FBI agents executed a search warrant at Jefferson's office in the Rayburn House Office Building. This is "believed to be the first-ever FBI raid on a Congressional office," raising concerns that it could "set a dangerous precedent that could be used by future administrations to intimidate or harass a supposedly coequal branch of the government."

The affidavit used to support these raids alleged:

- The FBI videotaped Jefferson receiving a stock certificate from Mody for a company set up in Nigeria to promote iGate's technology. Jefferson predicted the deal would generate $200 million annually after five years.
- Jefferson told Mody that he wanted a similar financial stake in the business in Ghana.
- Jefferson sought $10 million in financing from Mody to take over iGate and install "confidants" on the new board. In two payments, Mody wired $89,225 to the ANJ Group LLC, a company controlled by Jefferson's family.
- Jefferson lent $4,800 of the money Mody gave him to an unnamed congressional aide. Another $4,900 was given back to the FBI by one of Jefferson's attorneys.
- The FBI claims it has uncovered "at least seven other schemes in which Jefferson sought things of value in return for his official acts."

Incumbent U.S. Representative William J. Jefferson won the Democratic primaries on November 4. Jefferson had weathered a major challenge in the 2006 Louisiana 2nd congressional district election, when voters had fresh on their minds allegations that the representative had inappropriately used the services of a Louisiana Army National Guard unit in accessing his house during the aftermath of Hurricane Katrina.

By fall 2008, Jefferson was perceived by some as vulnerable, with only 25 percent of Democrats voting for him in the first round of the 2008 Democratic primaries. Jefferson faced six African-American challengers along with newscaster Helena Moreno in the first primary, all of them clamoring for change from Louisiana's reputation for political corruption. Jefferson defeated Moreno by 57 percent to 43 percent in a runoff which went largely along racial lines. Moreno later endorsed Cao in the general election. Cao, unopposed for the Republican nomination, was running against Jefferson, as were Green Party candidate Malik Rahim and Libertarian Party candidate Gregory Kahn. An earlier candidate, independent Jerry Jacobs, had withdrawn.

On November 30 the New Orleans Times-Picayune editorially endorsed Cao while on the op-ed page its columnist James Gill asserted that Jefferson's reelection "is not going to happen." The prospect of a serious general election in the majority African-American and heavily Democratic 2nd district was all the more startling in that the last Republican to represent the district was Hamilton D. Coleman, who left the office in 1891. According to the Los Angeles Times, Cao, if elected, would become the first individual of Vietnamese extraction to serve in the U.S. Congress.

Cao's candidacy received the endorsement of the Alliance for Good Government, the Family Research Council's Action PAC, Louisiana Governor Bobby Jindal, and even entertainer Pat Boone. New Orleans Mayor Ray Nagin had announced his support for Jefferson during the Democratic primary elections. The New Orleans Gambit Weekly, citing its opposition to Jefferson's alleged corruption and Cao's noncommittal statements on embryonic stem-cell research, made no endorsement.

The days before the December 6 election were characterized by what Jefferson's campaign called "overly negative" tactics undertaken on behalf of Cao's campaign by outside organizations such as the National Republican Congressional Committee. Besides references to Jefferson's removal from the House Ways and Means Committee by Democratic Speaker of the House Nancy Pelosi, the negative tactics included automated telephone calls from a woman identifying herself as "Katy" and citing incumbent Jefferson's federal indictment on 16 counts of corruption. In a meeting of African-American ministers, the Reverend Samuel Butler said that the real reason for the negative campaign tactics was to disenfranchise African-American voters, which prompted Cao advisor and former New Orleans City Council member Bryan Wagner to assert that, "with Rev. Butler's imagination, he may want to go to work for Walt Disney."

On December 6, the Times-Picayune reiterated its endorsement of Cao, this time pointing to President-Elect Barack Obama's efforts on behalf of Democrat Paul Carmouche in the simultaneous election in Louisiana's 4th congressional district and Obama's non-involvement in efforts to support Jefferson.

On December 6 at 10:20 PM CST, CNN projected Cao the winner. Final unofficial results on the Louisiana Secretary of State's web site showed Cao with 33,122 (49.55%), Jefferson 31,296 (46.82%), Kahn 548 (0.82%), and Rahim 1,880 (2.81%). Jefferson won by 23,197 to 20,246 in Orleans Parish, where 21 of the 392 precincts showed zero votes for Cao, but Cao won the precincts in Jefferson Parish by more than 4,000 votes.

=== Democratic primary ===
==== Candidates ====
- William J. Jefferson, incumbent Congressman
- Helena Moreno, former WDSU news anchor
- Cedric Richmond, State Representative
- James Carter, New Orleans City Councilman
- Byron Lee, Jefferson Parish Councilman
- Troy Carter, former New Orleans City Councilman
- Kenya Smith, former aide to Mayor Ray Nagin

==== Results ====
Democratic primary results
| Party | Candidate | Votes | % |
|---|---|---|---|
| Democratic | William J. Jefferson (inc.) | 17,510 | 25.30% |
| Democratic | Helena Moreno | 13,795 | 19.93% |
| Democratic | Cedric Richmond | 12,095 | 17.48% |
| Democratic | James Carter | 9,286 | 13.42% |
| Democratic | Byron Lee | 8,979 | 12.97% |
| Democratic | Troy Carter | 5,797 | 8.38% |
| Democratic | Kenya Smith | 1,749 | 2.53% |
| Total votes | | 69,211 | 100.00% |

==== Runoff results ====
Democratic primary runoff results
| Party | Candidate | Votes | % |
|---|---|---|---|
| Democratic | William J. Jefferson (inc.) | 92,921 | 56.79% |
| Democratic | Helena Moreno | 70,705 | 43.21% |
| Total votes | | 163,626 | 100.00% |

=== General election ===
==== Predictions ====
| Source | Ranking | As of |
|---|---|---|
| The Cook Political Report | Safe D | November 6, 2008 |
| Rothenberg | Safe D | November 2, 2008 |
| Sabato's Crystal Ball | Safe D | November 6, 2008 |
| Real Clear Politics | Safe D | November 7, 2008 |
| CQ Politics | Safe D | November 6, 2008 |

==== Results ====
2008 Louisiana's 2nd congressional district general election
| Party | Candidate | Votes | % |
|---|---|---|---|
| Republican | Joseph Cao | 33,132 | 49.54% |
| Democratic | William J. Jefferson (inc.) | 31,296 | 46.81% |
| Green | Malik Rahim | 1,880 | 2.81% |
| Libertarian | Gregory Kahn | 548 | 0.81% |
| Total votes | | 66,846 | 100.00% |
| Republican gain from Democratic | | | |

== District 3 ==
2008 Louisiana's 3rd congressional district election
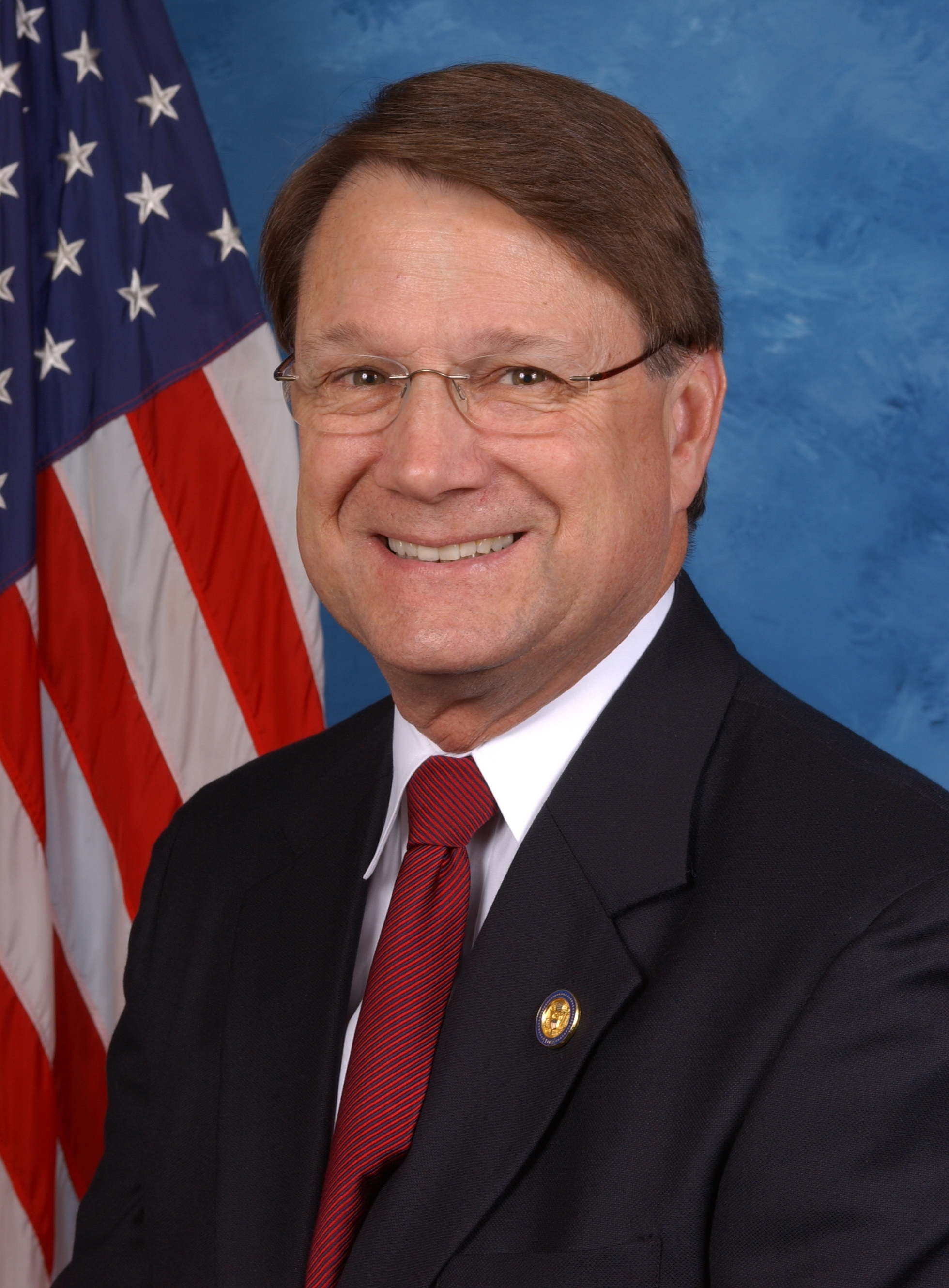
| Nominee | Charlie Melancon |
| Party | Democratic |
| Popular vote | Unopposed |
| Percentage |
U.S. Representative before election
Charlie Melancon
Democratic
Elected U.S. Representative
Charlie Melancon
Democratic

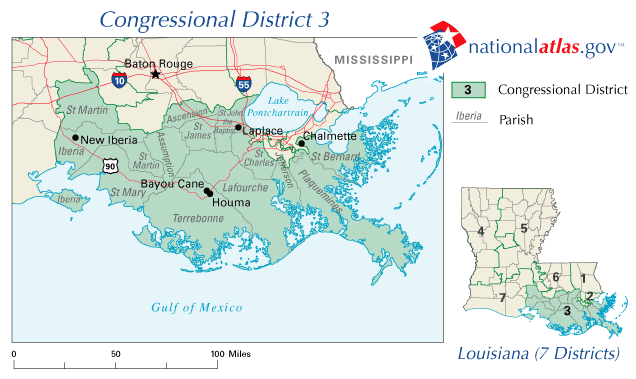

Democratic incumbent Charlie Melancon ran unopposed for re-election.

=== Predictions ===
| Source | Ranking | As of |
|---|---|---|
| The Cook Political Report | Safe D | November 6, 2008 |
| Rothenberg | Safe D | November 2, 2008 |
| Sabato's Crystal Ball | Safe D | November 6, 2008 |
| Real Clear Politics | Safe D | November 7, 2008 |
| CQ Politics | Safe D | November 6, 2008 |

Results

Louisiana's 3rd congressional district election, 2008
| Party | Candidate | Votes | % |
|---|---|---|---|
| Democratic | Charlie Melancon | Unopposed | |

== District 4 ==
2008 Louisiana's 4th congressional district election
- December 6, 2008
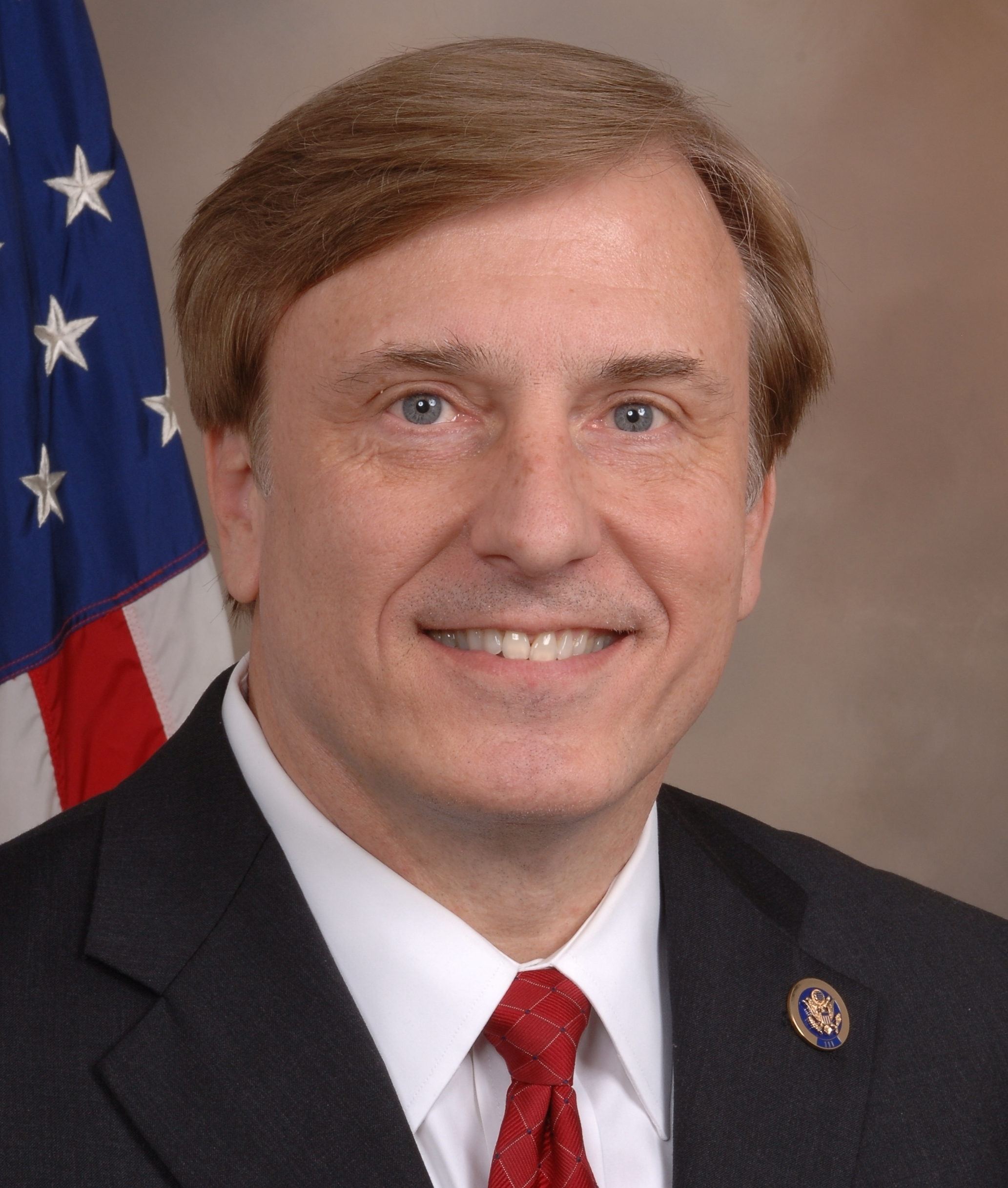

| Nominee | John Fleming | Paul Carmouche |
| Party | Republican | Democratic |
| Popular vote | 44,501 | 44,151 |
| Percentage | 48.07% | 47.69% |
- Parish results Fleming: 50–60% 60–70% 70–80% Carmouche: 40–50% 50–60%
U.S. Representative before election
Jim McCrery
Republican
Elected U.S. Representative
John Fleming
Republican

The election was held on December 6, 2008. Incumbent Jim McCrery retired, making this an open seat. The district contains northwestern Louisiana, including the cities of Shreveport, DeRidder, and Natchitoches. The district usually, but not reliably, votes Republican. Bill Clinton won it comfortably in 1996. CQ Politics' forecast of the race was "No Clear Favorite". In the Democratic primary, Caddo Parish District Attorney Paul Carmouche won the Democratic primary after defeating attorney Willie Banks in a runoff election. Former Webster Parish Coroner John Fleming won the Republican primary over trucking company executive Chris Gorman, whom he defeated in the runoff, and Jeff Thompson, who was endorsed by McCrery. Fleming ultimately defeated Carmouche by a narrow margin.

=== Democratic primary ===
==== Candidates ====
- Paul Carmouche, Caddo Parish District Attorney
- Willie Banks, attorney, retired U.S. Army officer
- John Milkovich, attorney
- Doc Cash, reverend, founder of Shreveport Christian Church

==== Results ====
Democratic primary results
| Party | Candidate | Votes | % |
|---|---|---|---|
| Democratic | Paul Carmouche | 36,936 | 48.12% |
| Democratic | Willie Banks | 17,621 | 22.96% |
| Democratic | John Milkovich | 16,137 | 21.02% |
| Democratic | Doc Cash | 6,065 | 7.90% |
| Total votes | | 76,759 | 100.00% |

==== Runoff results ====
Democratic primary runoff results
| Party | Candidate | Votes | % |
|---|---|---|---|
| Democratic | Paul Carmouche | 93,093 | 61.99% |
| Democratic | Willie Banks | 57,078 | 38.01% |
| Total votes | | 150,171 | 100.00% |

=== Republican primary ===
==== Candidates ====
- John Fleming, former Webster Parish Coroner, physician
- Chris Gorman, trucking company executive
- Jeff Thompson, president of the Bossier Chamber of Commerce

==== Results ====
Republican primary results
| Party | Candidate | Votes | % |
|---|---|---|---|
| Republican | John Fleming | 14,500 | 35.14% |
| Republican | Chris Gorman | 14,072 | 34.10% |
| Republican | Jeff Thompson | 12,693 | 30.76% |
| Total votes | | 41,265 | 100.00% |

==== Runoff results ====
Republican primary results
| Party | Candidate | Votes | % |
|---|---|---|---|
| Republican | John Fleming | 43,012 | 55.56% |
| Republican | Chris Gorman | 34,405 | 44.44% |
| Total votes | | 57,078 | 100.00% |

=== General election ===
==== Predictions ====
| Source | Ranking | As of |
|---|---|---|
| The Cook Political Report | Tossup | November 6, 2008 |
| Rothenberg | Tossup | November 2, 2008 |
| Sabato's Crystal Ball | Lean R | November 6, 2008 |
| Real Clear Politics | Lean R | November 7, 2008 |
| CQ Politics | Tossup | November 6, 2008 |

2008 Louisiana's 4th congressional district general election
| Party | Candidate | Votes | % |
|---|---|---|---|
| Republican | John Fleming | 44,501 | 48.07% |
| Democratic | Paul Carmouche | 44,151 | 47.69% |
| Independent | Catfish Kelley | 3,245 | 3.51% |
| Independent | Gerard J. Bowen Jr. | 675 | 0.73% |
| Total votes | | 92,572 | 100.00% |
| Republican hold | | | |

== District 5 ==
2008 Louisiana's 5th congressional district election
| Nominee | Rodney Alexander |
| Party | Republican |
| Popular vote | Unopposed |
U.S. Representative before election
Rodney Alexander
Republican
Elected U.S. Representative
Rodney Alexander
Republican

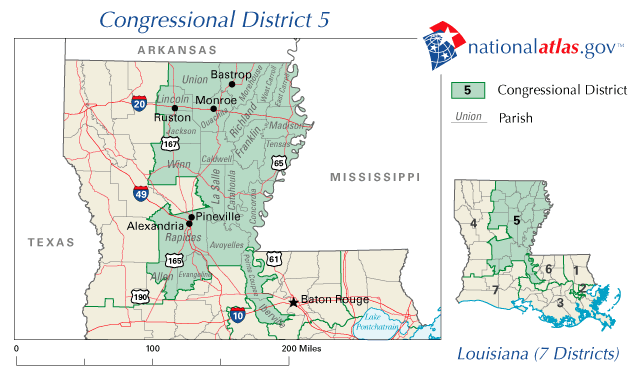

Incumbent Republican Congressman Rodney Alexander defeated challenger Andrew Clack in the Republican primary by a wide margin. He faced no opposition in the general election.

=== Republican primary ===
==== Candidates ====
- Rodney Alexander, incumbent Congressman
- Andrew Clack, technical support worker

==== Results ====
Republican primary results
| Party | Candidate | Votes | % |
|---|---|---|---|
| Republican | Rodney Alexander (inc.) | 27,819 | 89.68% |
| Republican | Andrew Clack | 3,203 | 10.32% |
| Total votes | | 31,022 | 100.00% |

=== General election ===
==== Predictions ====
| Source | Ranking | As of |
|---|---|---|
| The Cook Political Report | Safe R | November 6, 2008 |
| Rothenberg | Safe R | November 2, 2008 |
| Sabato's Crystal Ball | Safe R | November 6, 2008 |
| Real Clear Politics | Safe R | November 7, 2008 |
| CQ Politics | Safe R | November 6, 2008 |

== District 6 ==
2008 Louisiana's 6th congressional district election
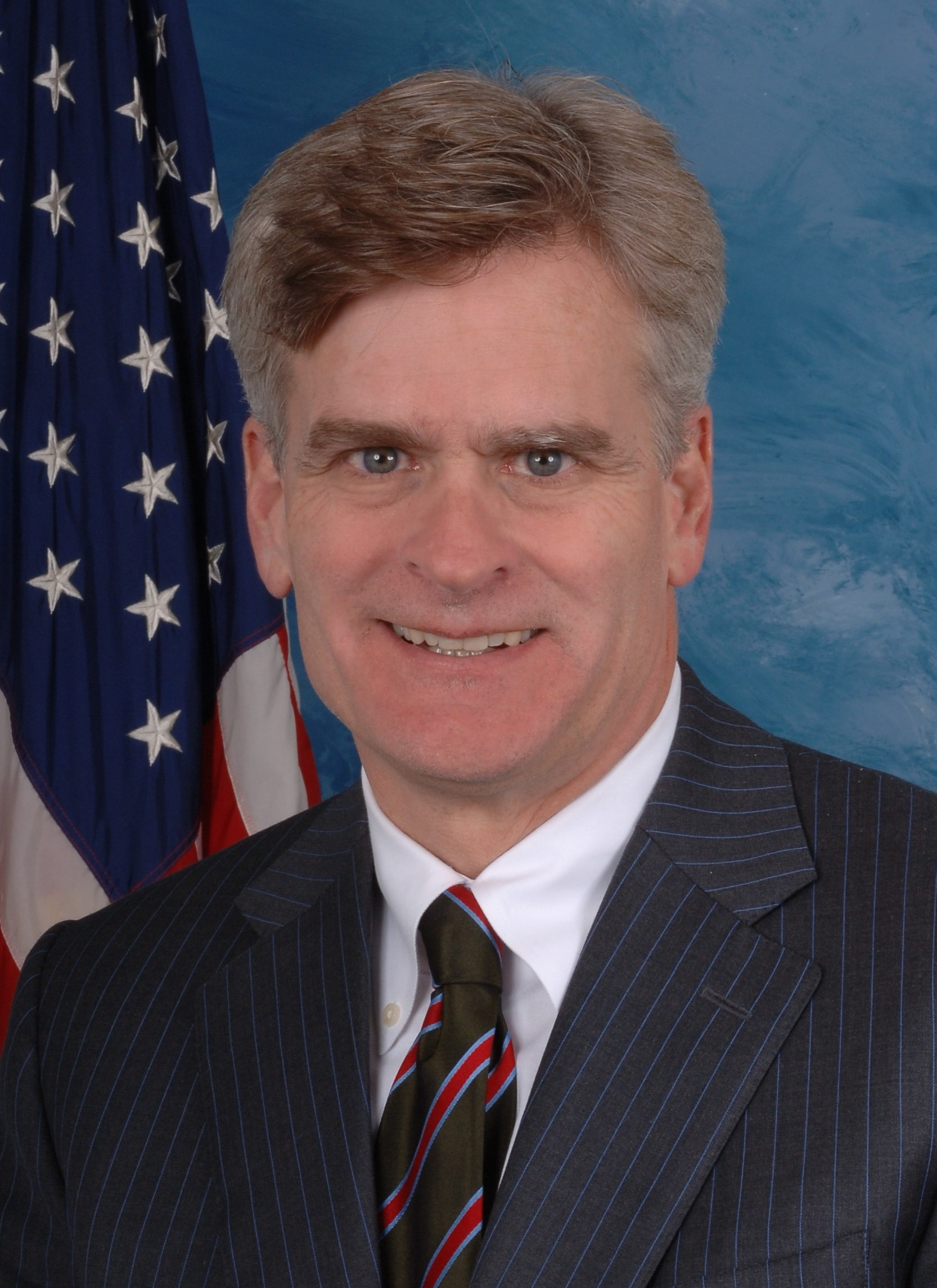

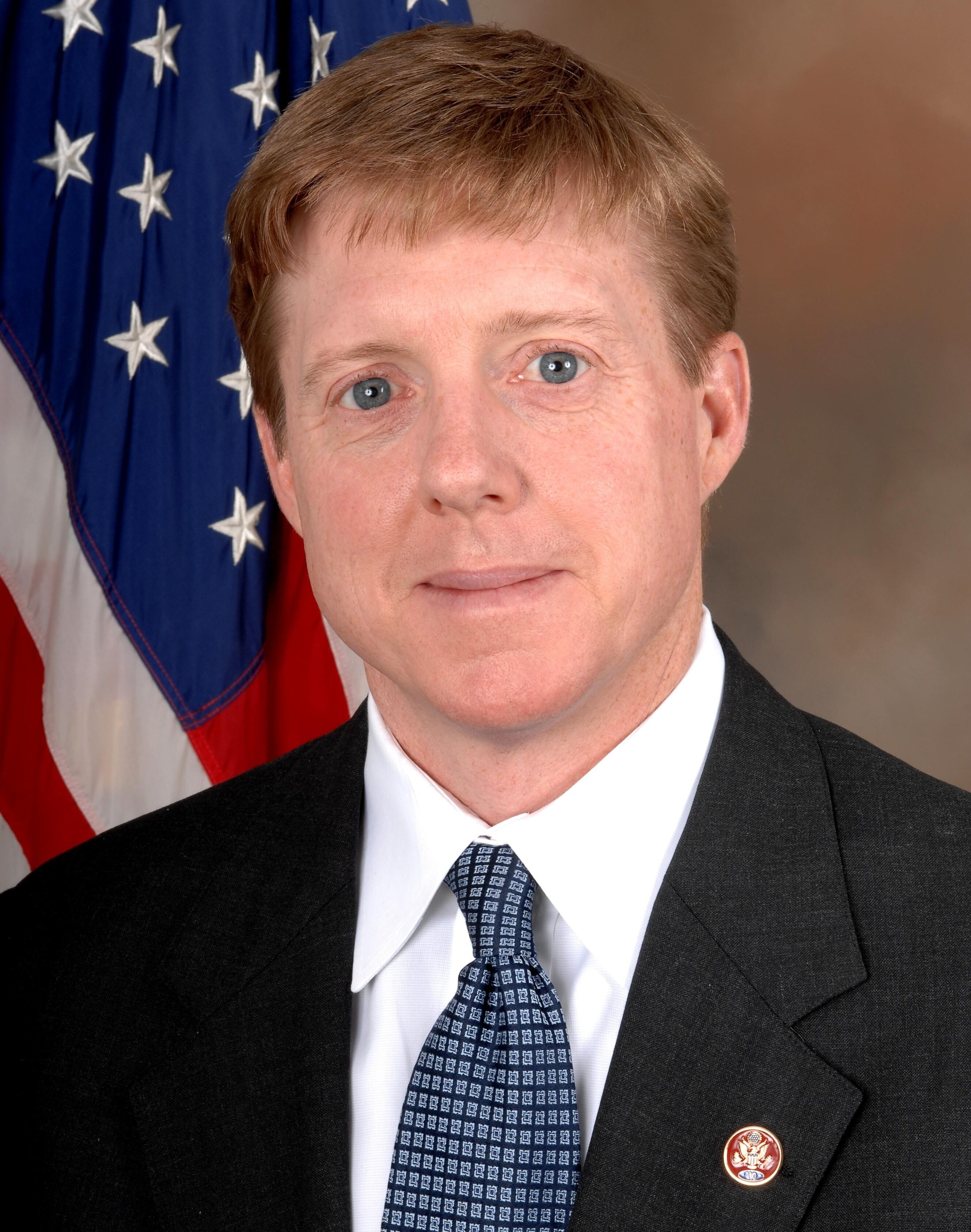

| Nominee | Bill Cassidy | Don Cazayoux | Michael L. Jackson |
| Party | Republican | Democratic | Independent |
| Popular vote | 150,332 | 125,886 | 36,198 |
| Percentage | 48.1% | 40.3% | 11.6% |
- Parish results Cassidy: 40–50% 60–70% Cazayoux: 40–50% 50–60% 70–80%
U.S. Representative before election
Don Cazayoux
Democratic
Elected U.S. Representative
Bill Cassidy
Republican

Republican State Senator Bill Cassidy defeated Democratic incumbent Don Cazayoux in the November 4 election by a margin of 48% to 40%. Cazayoux had defeated Republican Woody Jenkins 49% to 46% in a special election earlier in the year, and given his narrow margin of victory and the Republican-leaning nature of the district (Bush won 59% here in 2004), Cazayoux was, as expected, a GOP target as he sought his first full term.

State Representative Michael L. Jackson, who had run against Cazayoux in the Democratic primary in the special election, ran as an independent with funding from long-time Cassidy supporter Lane Grigsby. He finished third, garnering 36,133 votes, more than the 25,000-vote margin between Cassidy and Cazayoux, suggesting that he siphoned off many African-American votes that would have otherwise gone to Cazayoux and threw the election to Cassidy. The Daily Kingfish published photos of Jackson meeting with Congressman-elect Cassidy just three days after the election. Cazayoux was one of five incumbent House Democrats to be defeated in the 2008 congressional elections, along with Nancy Boyda (D-KS), William J. Jefferson (D-LA), Nick Lampson (D-TX), and Tim Mahoney (D-FL).

=== General election ===
==== Predictions ====
| Source | Ranking | As of |
|---|---|---|
| The Cook Political Report | Tossup | November 6, 2008 |
| Rothenberg | Tossup | November 2, 2008 |
| Sabato's Crystal Ball | Lean D | November 6, 2008 |
| Real Clear Politics | Lean D | November 7, 2008 |
| CQ Politics | Tossup | November 6, 2008 |

==== Results ====
2008 Louisiana's 6th congressional district general election
| Party | Candidate | Votes | % |
|---|---|---|---|
| Republican | Bill Cassidy | 150,332 | 48.12% |
| Democratic | Don Cazayoux (inc.) | 125,886 | 40.29% |
| Independent | Michael L. Jackson | 36,198 | 11.59% |
| Total votes | | 312,416 | 100.00% |
| Republican gain from Democratic | | | |

== District 7 ==
2008 Louisiana's 7th congressional district election
- November 4, 2008
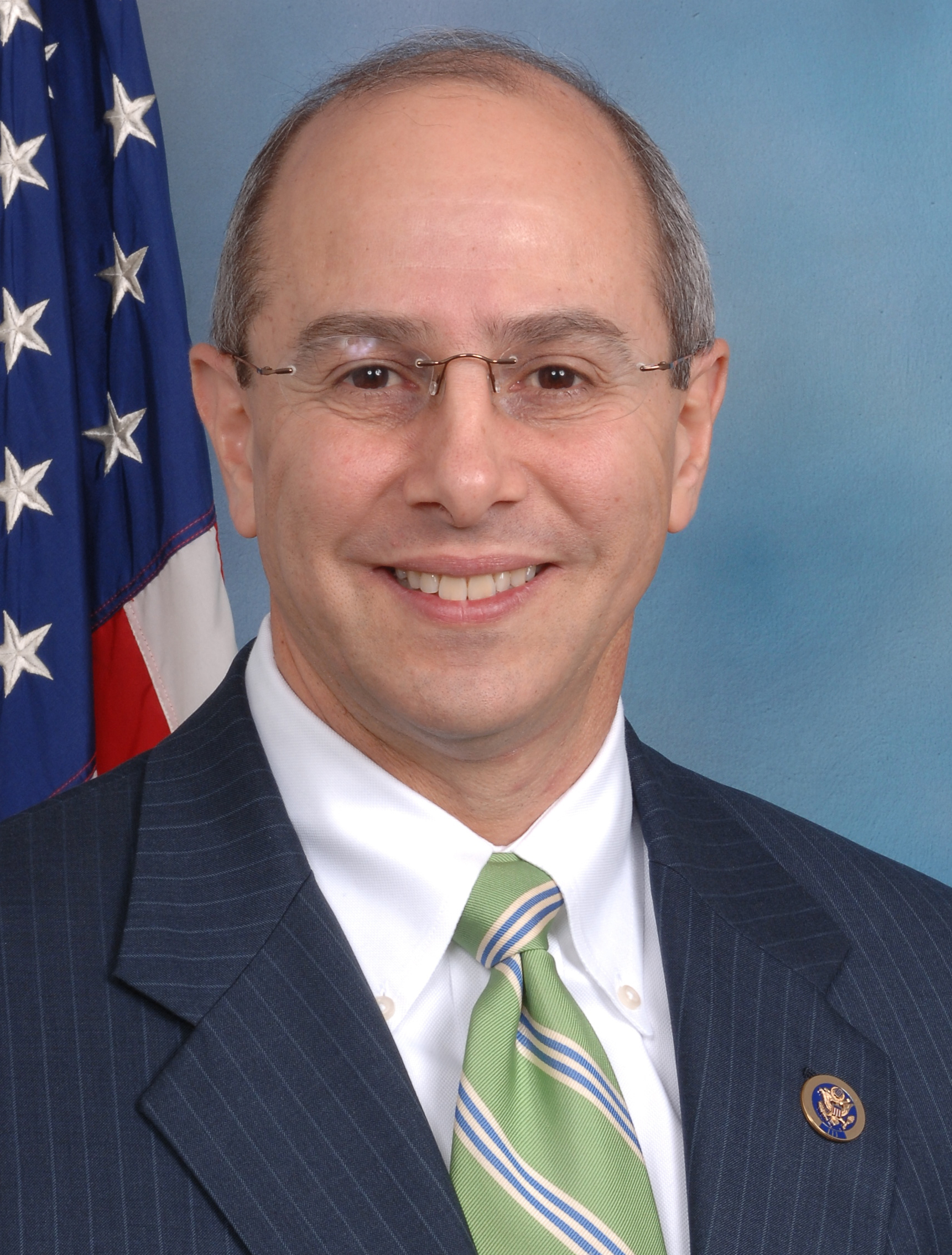

| Nominee | Charles Boustany | Don Cravins Jr. |
| Party | Republican | Democratic |
| Popular vote | 177,173 | 98,280 |
| Percentage | 61.88% | 34.33% |
- Parish results Boustany: 50–60% 60–70% 70–80% Cravins: 40–50%
U.S. Representative before election
Charles Boustany
Republican
Elected U.S. Representative
Charles Boustany
Republican

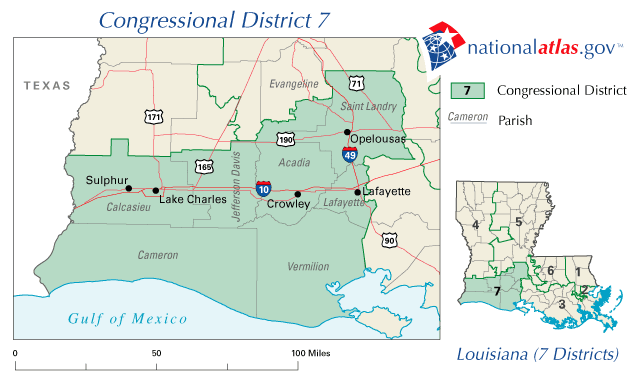

Republican incumbent Charles Boustany defeated Democratic State Senator Don Cravins, Jr. and Constitution Party candidate Peter Vidrine by a solid margin in this district based in southwestern Louisiana.

=== General election ===
==== Predictions ====
| Source | Ranking | As of |
|---|---|---|
| The Cook Political Report | Likely R | November 6, 2008 |
| Rothenberg | Safe R | November 2, 2008 |
| Sabato's Crystal Ball | Lean R | November 6, 2008 |
| Real Clear Politics | Safe R | November 7, 2008 |
| CQ Politics | Likely R | November 6, 2008 |

==== Results ====
2008 Louisiana's 7th congressional district general election
| Party | Candidate | Votes | % |
|---|---|---|---|
| Republican | Charles Boustany (inc.) | 177,173 | 61.88% |
| Democratic | Don Cravins Jr. | 98,280 | 34.33% |
| Constitution | Peter Vidrine | 10,846 | 3.79% |
| Total votes | | 286,299 | 100.00% |
| Republican hold | | | |
