= J. Walter Green =

American attorney (born 1964)

United States Attorney for the Middle District of Louisiana
- In office July 1, 2013 – March 10, 2017; Acting: July 1, 2013 – June 2, 2014
- President: Barack Obama; Donald Trump
- Preceded by: Don Cazayoux
- Succeeded by: Corey R. Amundson (acting)

Personal details
- Born: November 27, 1964 (age 60)
- Political party: Democratic

J. Walter Green (born November 27, 1964) is an American attorney who served as the United States Attorney for the Middle District of Louisiana from 2013 to 2017.

== See also ==
- 2017 dismissal of U.S. attorneys
