= Carl Crane =

American politician (1939–2024)

Member of East Baton Rouge City-Parish Council
- In office 1977–1982

Member of the Louisiana House of Representatives
- In office 1982–2007
- Preceded by: Frank P. Simoneaux
- Succeeded by: Franklin Foil

Personal details
- Born: Carl Norman Crane; October 28, 1939 Ponchatoula, Louisiana, U.S.
- Died: April 14, 2024 (aged 84) Baton Rouge, Louisiana, U.S.
- Party: Democratic; Republican
- Education: University of New Orleans; Louisiana State University

Carl Norman Crane (October 28, 1939 – April 14, 2024) was an American politician. A member of the Democratic Party and the Republican Party, he served in the East Baton Rouge City-Parish Council from 1977 to 1982 and in the Louisiana House of Representatives from 1982 to 2007.

== Life and career ==
Crane was born in Ponchatoula, Louisiana, the son of Roy and Lillian Crane. He attended the University of New Orleans, earning his M.A. degree. He also attended Louisiana State University, earning his B.A. degree.

Crane served in the East Baton Rouge City-Parish Council from 1977 to 1982. After his service in the City-Parish Council, he then served in the Louisiana House of Representatives from 1982 to 2007.

== Death ==
Crane died on April 14, 2024, in Baton Rouge, Louisiana, at the age of 84.
