= Paul Carmouche =

American lawyer (born 1943)

Paul Joseph Carmouche

District Attorney for Caddo Parish
- In office January 2, 1979 – January 1, 2009
- Succeeded by: Charles Scott

Personal details
- Born: June 23, 1943 (age 83) Napoleonville; Assumption Parish, Louisiana
- Party: Democratic
- Spouse(s): (1) Margaret Adeline Looney Carmouche (divorced) (2) Marti Hudson Carmouche
- Children: Marianna Carmuouche Clement
- Education: Nicholls State University (BA); Loyola University New Orleans College of Law, JD (1969)
- Occupation: Attorney

Paul Joseph Carmouche (born June 23, 1943) is an American lawyer who served as a five-term District Attorney for Caddo Parish, Louisiana from 1979 to 2009. Before his tenure as district attorney, Carmouche graduated from Loyola University New Orleans Law School in 1969 and worked as an assistant in the DA's office from 1974 to 1977. Carmouche was also a one-time candidate for the United States House of Representatives for Louisiana's 4th congressional district, having narrowly lost that race to Republican challenger John C. Fleming in 2008.

== Biography ==
Paul Carmouche was born and reared in Napoleonville in Assumption Parish in south Louisiana, where he attended public schools. He received his Juris Doctor degree in 1969 from Loyola University New Orleans College of Law, where he was President of the Law School student body. He was admitted to the State Bar of Louisiana in 1969.

Carmouche was first married to the former Margaret Adeline Looney (1945-2017), the daughter of the late Frank O'Neill and Beatrice Mae Burgoyne Looney. Margaret was a speech pathologist who was a member of the first graduating class in 1973 at LSU Health Sciences Center Shreveport. Margaret was employed by the Caddo Parish School Board and thereafter worked in hospitals and nursing homes with specialization in traumatic brain injuries. Paul and Margaret have a daughter, Marianna Carmouche Clement (born 1980), who is married to Scott Clement of Dallas, Texas. Marianna has worked for the National Multiple Sclerosis Society.

== Law career ==
After law school, Carmouche joined a small civil law firm, and handled civil and criminal cases for four years, before joining the Caddo Parish District Attorney's office in October 1973 as an Assistant District Attorney (ADA). From the DA's office, he went on to serve as Chief Counsel Indigent Defender Office from 1977 to 1978.

Carmouche was elected to the office of Caddo Parish District Attorney in the September 16, 1978 election at age 35, taking office on January 2, 1979. The Caddo Parish District Attorney’s Office is responsible for prosecuting all felony and misdemeanor crimes in the parish, which is the third most populous parish in Louisiana, with a 2006-census estimated population of 253,118. During Carmouche's tenure in the DA's office, new services added include a Pretrial Diversion Section, Victim/Witness Section, Domestic Violence & Sexual Assault Section, Child Support Division, Hot Check Section, White Collar Crimes Section, Sex Crimes Screening Unit and a Homicide Screening Unit; as well, making the office fully computerized with online information available to the public. He hired Scott Crichton as an assistant DA; Crichton in 1991 became one of the Louisiana 1st Judicial District Court judges in Caddo Parish.

Carmouche is a past president of the Louisiana District Attorney’s Association, and is admitted to practice before the Federal 5th Circuit Court of Appeals and the U.S. Supreme Court. Carmouche retired as district attorney in January 2009 and now is a criminal defense attorney in private practice.

== 2008 Congressional race ==
In February 2008, Carmouche announced that he would not seek re-election as District Attorney. On March 19, 2008, Carmouche announced that he would run for the congressional seat vacated by retiring Republican Jim McCrery, who held the seat since the spring of 1988.

On November 4, 2008, Carmouche procured the Democratic nomination in a runoff over the African American attorney Willie Banks, Jr., 93,093 (62 percent) to 57,078 (38 percent). Eliminated in the primary was later State Senator John Milkovich, a Shreveport lawyer.

On December 6, 2008, Carmouche lost the general election by 356 votes to Minden physician John Fleming, who was succeeded in January 2017 by another Republican, Mike Johnson, who would become the 56th Speaker of the United States House of Representatives in 2023.

== See also ==
- United States House of Representatives elections in Louisiana, 2008#District 4
