= 2006 United States House of Representatives elections in Louisiana =

- November 7, 2006

All 7 Louisiana seats to the United States House of Representatives
	Majority party	Minority party
Party	Republican	Democratic
Last election	5	2
Seats won	5	2
Seat change	Steady	Steady
Popular vote	579,702	309,279
Percentage	63.29%	33.76%

Republican
50–60%
60–70%
70–80%
80–90%
Democratic
50–60%
60–70%
70–80%
80–90%
90–100%

The first round of the Louisiana House election of 2006 were held on Tuesday, November 7, 2006. The terms of all seven Representatives to the United States House of Representatives will expire on January 3, 2007, and will be put up for contest. The winning candidates will serve a two-year term from January 3, 2007, to January 3, 2009. If necessary, a runoff round will be held on December 9, 2006.

Louisiana uses a unique voting system to determine its representation in the U.S. Congress. Elections in Louisiana—with the exception of U.S. presidential elections—follow a variation of the open primary system called the jungle primary. Candidates of any and all parties are listed on one ballot; voters need not limit themselves to the candidates of one party. Unless one candidate takes more than 50% of the vote in the first round, a run-off election is then held between the top two candidates, who may in fact be members of the same party. This means that the outcome of some races might not be known until over a month later than the rest of the country.

The Louisiana races, especially those in the southern portion of the state, were impacted to some extent as a result of Hurricane Katrina, as well as Hurricane Rita, both of which have caused massive damage within Louisiana. For example, most of New Orleans' majority African-American communities were displaced by Katrina.

All Louisiana Congressmen won re-election and avoided a run-off except Democrat William Jefferson of New Orleans, under investigation for corruption. He won a run-off against fellow Democrat Karen Carter.

== Overview ==
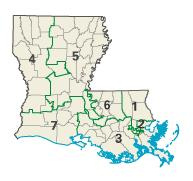
Louisiana congressional districts

United States House of Representatives elections in Louisiana, 2006
Party	Votes	Percentage	Seats	+/–
Republican	579,702	63.29%	5	—
Democratic	309,279	33.76%	2	—
Libertarian	25,772	2.81%	0	—
Independents	1,262	0.14%	0	—
Totals	916,015	100.00%	7	—

Note: For calculating the totals of the Democratic and Republican parties with regard to the 2nd district, the jungle primary results, not the runoff results, are used.

== District 1 ==
2006 Louisiana's 1st congressional district election
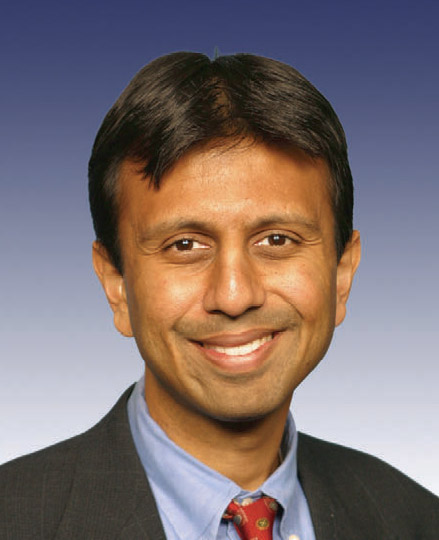

Nominee	Bobby Jindal	David Gereighty
Party	Republican	Democratic
Popular vote	130,508	10,919
Percentage	88.1%	7.4%
- Parish results Jindal: 80–90% 90–100%
U.S. Representative before election
Bobby Jindal
Republican
Elected U.S. Representative
Bobby Jindal
Republican

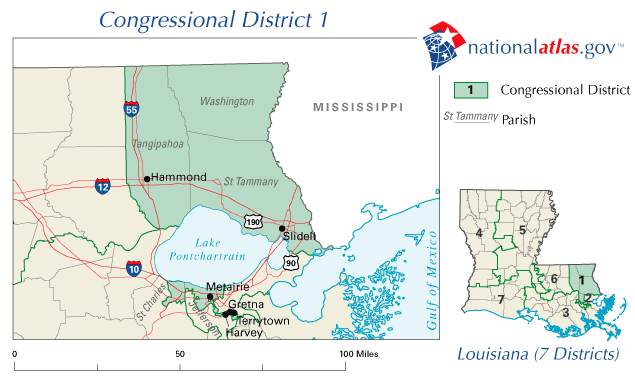

Incumbent Republican Congressman Bobby Jindal, first elected in 2004, faced no serious challenge from Democratic challengers David Gereighty, an electrical engineer, and Stacey Tallitsch, a computer engineer, or from Libertarian opponent Peter Beary. This highly conservative district is based around Lake Pontchartrain and the suburbs of New Orleans and Jindal was re-elected with nearly ninety percent of the vote.

=== Predictions ===
Source	Ranking	As of
The Cook Political Report	Safe R	November 6, 2006
Rothenberg	Safe R	November 6, 2006
Sabato's Crystal Ball	Safe R	November 6, 2006
Real Clear Politics	Safe R	November 7, 2006
CQ Politics	Safe R	November 7, 2006

Louisiana's 1st Congressional district election, 2006
Party	Candidate	Votes	%
Republican	Bobby Jindal (incumbent)	130,508	88.11
Democratic	David Gereighty	10,919	7.37
Democratic	Stacey Tallitsch	5,025	3.39
Libertarian	Peter L. Beary	1,676	1.13
Total votes		148,128	100.00
Republican hold			

== District 2 ==
2006 Louisiana's 2nd congressional district election
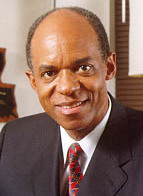

Nominee	William J. Jefferson	Karen Carter
Party	Democratic	Democratic
Popular vote	35,153	27,011
Percentage	56.5%	43.5%
U.S. Representative before election
William J. Jefferson
Democratic
Elected U.S. Representative
William J. Jefferson
Democratic

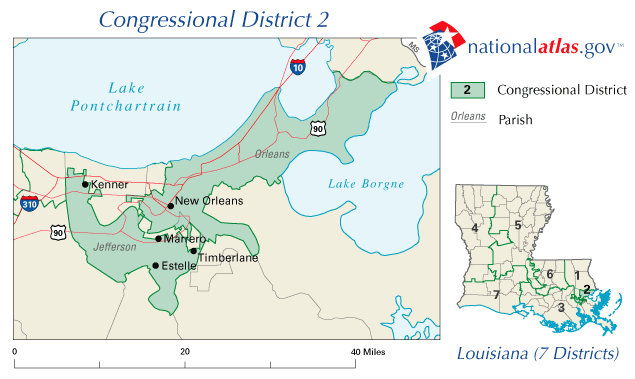

This staunchly liberal district, based mainly within the city of New Orleans, has elected Bill Jefferson to Congress consecutively since 1990. Seeking his ninth term in Congress, Jefferson was largely unpopular due to the fact that he was under federal investigation for corruption charges at the time, and therefore, a great many candidates emerged to challenge him. On the Democratic side, State Representative Karen Carter, State Senator Derrick Shepherd, New Orleans City Councilman Troy Carter, Orleans Parish School Board attorney Regina Bartholomew, John Edwards, Scott Barron, former congressional candidate Vinny Mendoza, and D.C. Collins ran. Republicans Joe Lavigne, an attorney; Eric Bradley; Lance von Uhde and Libertarian Rhumbline Kahn also ran, creating a very crowded race. On October 14, the Louisiana State Democratic party voted to endorse Karen Carter. In the first line of balloting, no candidate received a majority of the votes, so the top two candidates, Jefferson and Carter, advanced to a second line of balloting, which Jefferson ultimately won by a comfortable margin, despite the corruption charges against him.

=== Predictions ===
Source	Ranking	As of
The Cook Political Report	Likely D	November 6, 2006
Rothenberg	Safe D	November 6, 2006
Sabato's Crystal Ball	Safe D	November 6, 2006
Real Clear Politics	Safe D	November 7, 2006
CQ Politics	Safe D	November 7, 2006

Louisiana's 2nd congressional district election, 2006
Party	Candidate	Votes	%
Democratic	William J. Jefferson (incumbent)	28,283	30.08
Democratic	Karen Carter	20,364	21.66
Democratic	Derrick Shepherd	16,799	17.87
Republican	Joe Lavigne	12,511	13.31
Democratic	Troy Carter	11,304	12.02
Republican	Eric T. Bradley	1,159	1.23
Democratic	Regina Bartholomew	1,125	1.20
Libertarian	Gregory W. Kahn	404	0.38
Total votes		107,543	100.00

Louisiana's 2nd congressional district election runoff, 2006
Party	Candidate	Votes	%
Democratic	William J. Jefferson (incumbent)	35,153	56.55
Democratic	Karen Carter	27,011	43.45
Total votes		62,164	100.00
Democratic hold			

== District 3 ==
2006 Louisiana's 3rd congressional district election
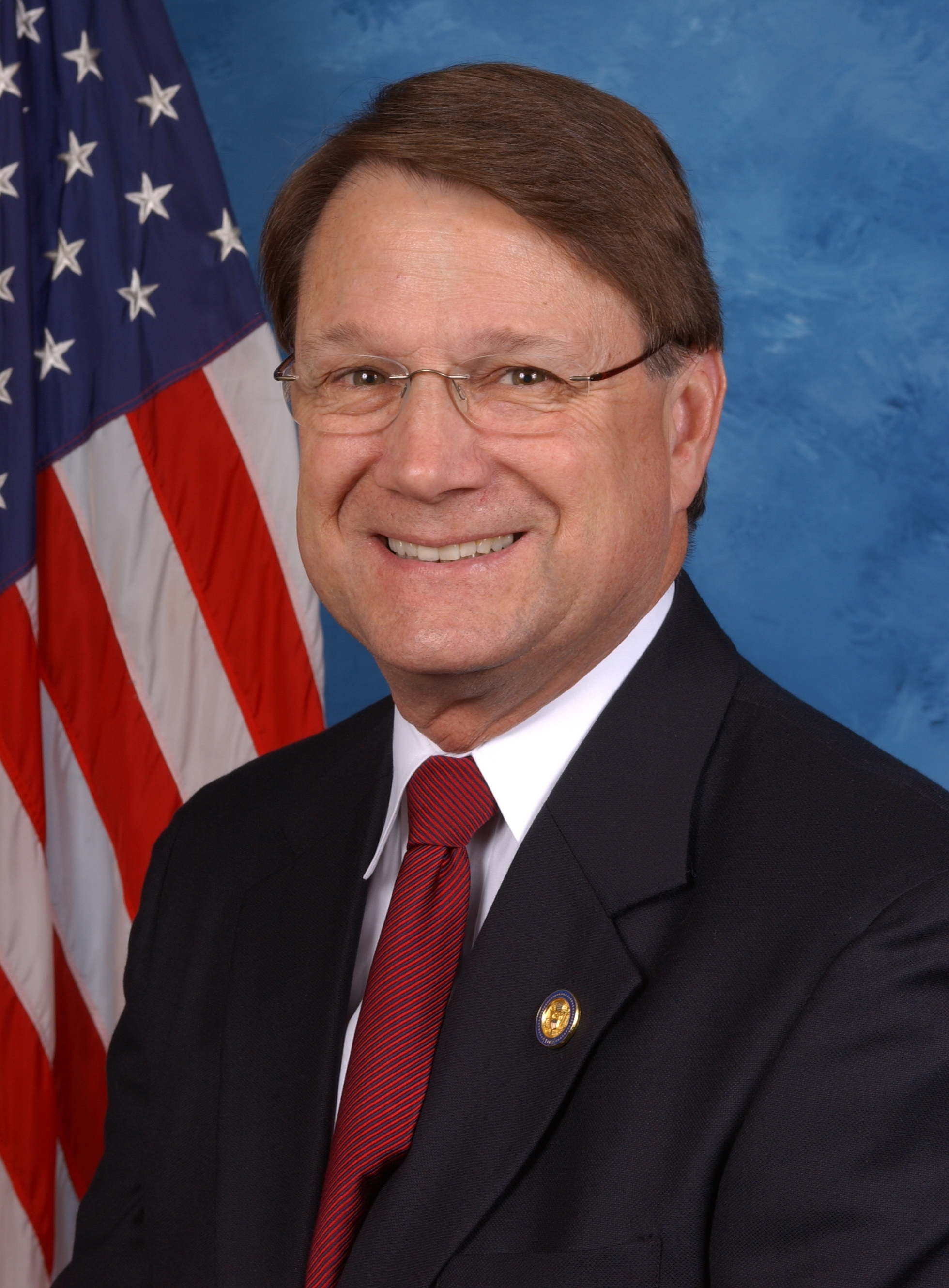

Nominee	Charlie Melançon	Craig Romero
Party	Democratic	Republican
Popular vote	75,023	54,950
Percentage	55.03%	40.31%
- Melançon: 40–50% 50–60% 60–70% 70–80% 80–90% >90% Romero: 40–50% 50–60% 60–70% 70–80% Tie: 40–50%
U.S. Representative before election
Charlie Melançon
Democratic
Elected U.S. Representative
Charlie Melançon
Democratic

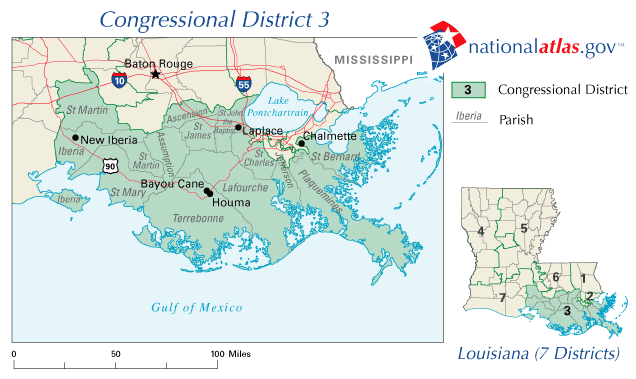

Incumbent Democratic Congressman Charlie Melançon won his first term 2004 by defeating Billy Tauzin III, the son of the retiring Congressman by only 569 votes, leading many to conclude that he was vulnerable to a Republican challenger. State Senator Craig Romero emerged as Melançon's chief competitor, though Democrat O.J. Breech and Libertarian James Blake also ran, but ultimately fell to Melançon by a surprisingly comfortable margin in this solidly conservative district based in the southern suburbs of New Orleans and south-central Louisiana.

=== Predictions ===
Source	Ranking	As of
The Cook Political Report	Lean D	November 6, 2006
Rothenberg	Safe D	November 6, 2006
Sabato's Crystal Ball	Likely D	November 6, 2006
Real Clear Politics	Safe D	November 7, 2006
CQ Politics	Likely D	November 7, 2006

Louisiana's 3rd Congressional district election, 2006
Party	Candidate	Votes	%
Democratic	Charlie Melançon (incumbent)	75,023	55.03
Republican	Craig Romero	54,950	40.31
Democratic	Olangee Breech	4,190	3.07
Libertarian	James Lee Blake, Jr.	2,168	1.59
Total votes		136,331	100.00
Democratic hold			

== District 4 ==
2006 Louisiana's 4th congressional district election
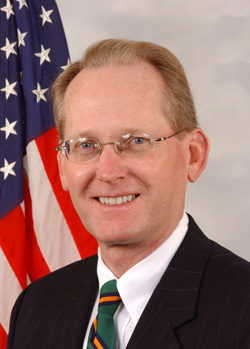

Nominee	Jim McCrery	Artis R. Cash, Sr.	Patti Cox
Party	Republican	Democratic	Democratic
Popular vote	77,078	22,757	17,788
Percentage	57.4%	16.9%	13.3%
Nominee	Chester T. "Catfish" Kelley
Party	Republican
Popular vote	16,649
Percentage	12.4%
- Parish results Mccrery: 40–50% 50–60% 60–70% 70–80%
U.S. Representative before election
Jim McCrery
Republican
Elected U.S. Representative
Jim McCrery
Republican

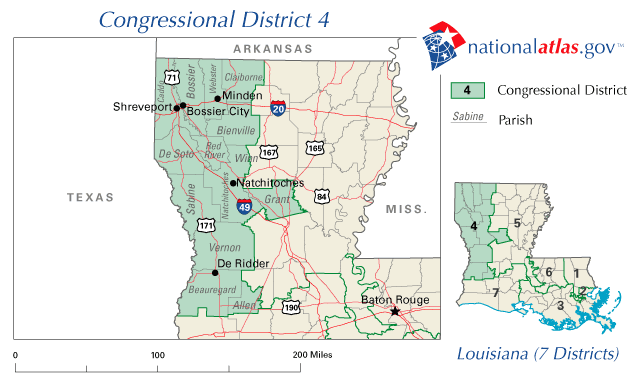

This district, based in northwestern Louisiana and Greater Shreveport, is staunchly conservative and has consistently re-elected incumbent Republican Congressman Jim McCrery with solid margins since his initial election in 1988. This year proved to be no different, and Congressman McCrery walloped Democrats Artis Cash and Patti Cox and Republican Chester Kelley with over fifty-seven percent of the vote.

=== Predictions ===
Source	Ranking	As of
The Cook Political Report	Safe R	November 6, 2006
Rothenberg	Safe R	November 6, 2006
Sabato's Crystal Ball	Safe R	November 6, 2006
Real Clear Politics	Safe R	November 7, 2006
CQ Politics	Safe R	November 7, 2006

Louisiana's 4th Congressional district election, 2006
Party	Candidate	Votes	%
Republican	Jim McCrery (incumbent)	77,078	57.40
Democratic	Artis R. Cash, Sr.	22,757	16.95
Democratic	Patti Cox	17,788	13.25
Republican	Chester T. "Catfish" Kelley	16,649	12.40
Total votes		134,272	100.00
Republican hold			

== District 5 ==
2006 Louisiana's 5th congressional district election

Nominee	Rodney Alexander	Gloria Williams Hearn
Party	Republican	Democratic
Popular vote	78,211	33,233
Percentage	68.3%	29.0%
- Parish results Alexander: 40–50% 50–60% 60–70% 70–80% Hearn: 50–60%
U.S. Representative before election
Rodney Alexander
Republican
Elected U.S. Representative
Rodney Alexander
Republican

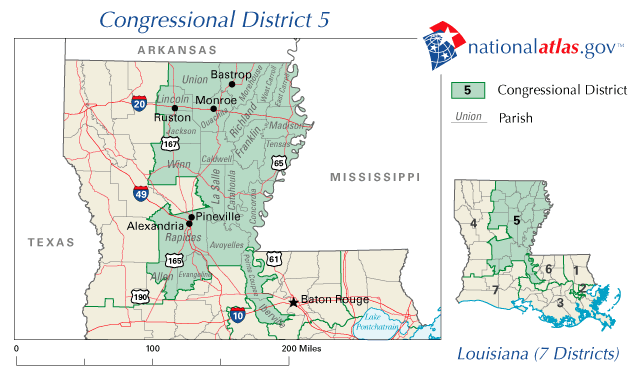

Incumbent Republican Congressman Rodney Alexander was initially elected to this conservative, northeast Louisiana district in 2002 as a Democrat, but switched to the Republican Party in 2004 and was re-elected for the first time as a Republican. In 2006, he was re-elected in a landslide over Democrat Gloria Hearn, Libertarian Brent Sanders, and independent John Watts.

=== Predictions ===
Source	Ranking	As of
The Cook Political Report	Safe R	November 6, 2006
Rothenberg	Safe R	November 6, 2006
Sabato's Crystal Ball	Safe R	November 6, 2006
Real Clear Politics	Safe R	November 7, 2006
CQ Politics	Safe R	November 7, 2006

Louisiana's 5th Congressional district election, 2006
Party	Candidate	Votes	%
Republican	Rodney Alexander (incumbent)	78,211	68.26
Democratic	Gloria Williams Hearn	33,233	29.00
Libertarian	Brent Sanders	1,876	1.64
Independent	John Watts	1,262	1.10
Total votes		114,582	100.00
Republican hold			

== District 6 ==
2006 Louisiana's 6th congressional district election
- November 7, 2006
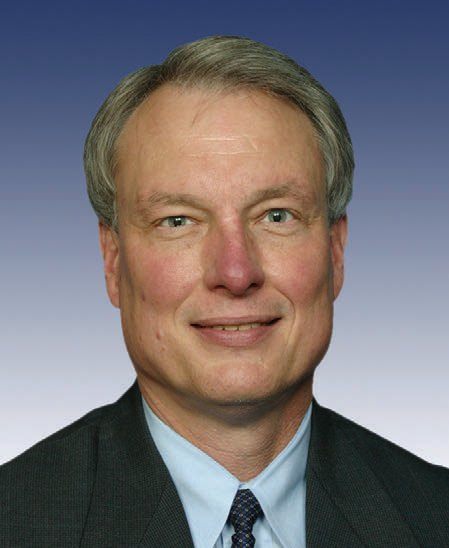

Nominee	Richard Baker	Richard Fontanesi
Party	Republican	Libertarian
Popular vote	94,658	19,648
Percentage	82.81%	17.19%
- Parish results Baker: 70–80% 80–90%
U.S. Representative before election
Richard Baker
Republican
Elected U.S. Representative
Richard Baker
Republican

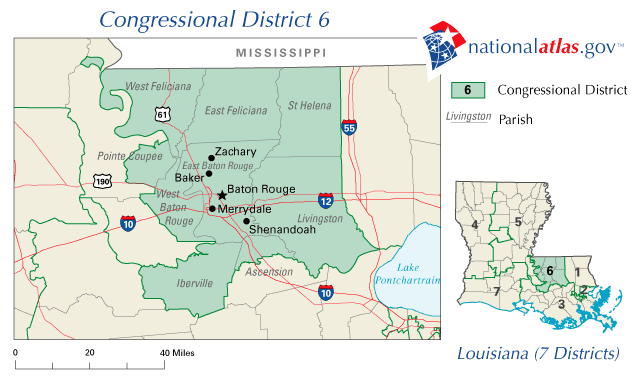

This conservative district is based around the Baton Rouge metropolitan area and was represented by Republican Congressman Richard Baker. Baker sought his eleventh term in Congress and faced no Democratic challenger, but did square off against Libertarian candidate Richard Fontanesi, a contest that he won in an overwhelming landslide.

=== Predictions ===
Source	Ranking	As of
The Cook Political Report	Safe R	November 6, 2006
Rothenberg	Safe R	November 6, 2006
Sabato's Crystal Ball	Safe R	November 6, 2006
Real Clear Politics	Safe R	November 7, 2006
CQ Politics	Safe R	November 7, 2006

Louisiana's 6th Congressional district election, 2006
Party	Candidate	Votes	%
Republican	Richard H. Baker (incumbent)	94,658	82.81
Libertarian	Richard Fontanesi	19,648	17.19
Total votes		114,306	100.00
Republican hold			

== District 7 ==
2006 Louisiana's 7th congressional district election
- November 7, 2006
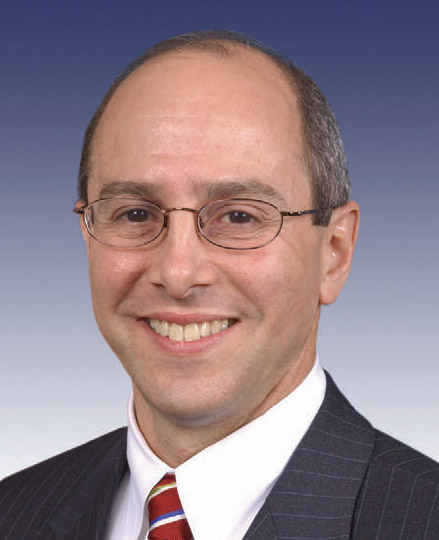

Nominee	Charles Boustany	Mike Stagg
Party	Republican	Democratic
Popular vote	113,720	47,133
Percentage	70.70%	29.30%
- Parish results Boustany: 60–70% 70–80% 80–90%
U.S. Representative before election
Charles Boustany
Republican
Elected U.S. Representative
Charles Boustany
Republican

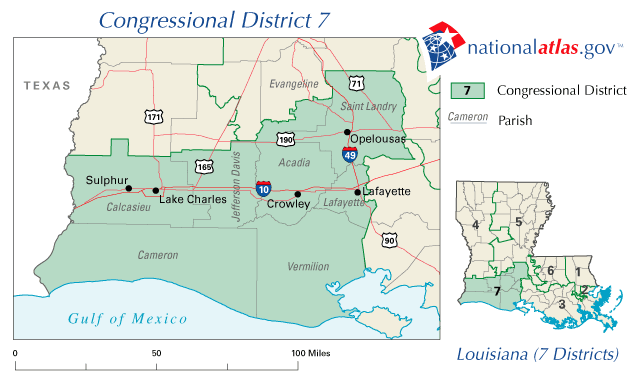

Incumbent Republican Congressman Charles Boustany sought a second term in this conservative district based in the Cajun, southwest portion of the state. Boustany's initial election in 2004, to replace previous Congressman Chris John was relatively close and attracted national attention. In 2006, he faced Democratic nominee Mike Stagg, and the contest proved to be relatively uneventful, with Boustany winning a second term with over seventy percent of the vote.

=== Predictions ===
Source	Ranking	As of
The Cook Political Report	Safe R	November 6, 2006
Rothenberg	Safe R	November 6, 2006
Sabato's Crystal Ball	Safe R	November 6, 2006
Real Clear Politics	Safe R	November 7, 2006
CQ Politics	Likely R	November 7, 2006

Louisiana's 7th congressional district election, 2006
Party	Candidate	Votes	%
Republican	Charles Boustany (incumbent)	113,720	70.70
Democratic	Mike Stagg	47,133	29.30
Total votes		160,853	100.00
Republican hold			

== See also ==
- 2006 United States elections
- 2006 United States House of Representatives elections
