= 2008 Louisiana's 1st congressional district special election =

- May 3, 2008
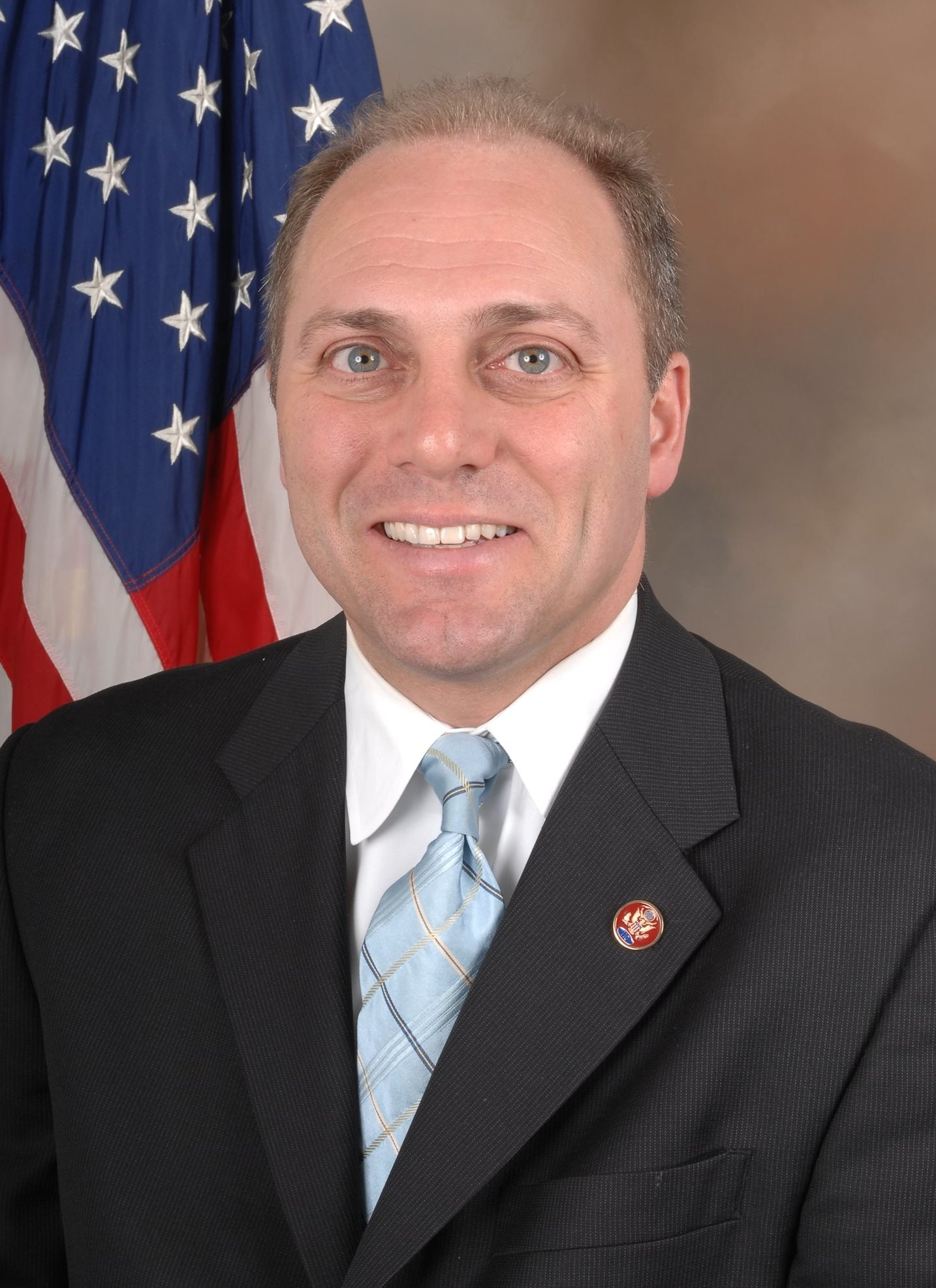

Candidate	Steve Scalise	Gilda Reed
Party	Republican	Democratic
Popular vote	33,867	10,142
Percentage	75.13%	22.50%
Representative before election
Bobby Jindal
Republican
Elected Representative
Steve Scalise
Republican

Voters in Louisiana's 1st congressional district voting in a special election on May 3, 2008, elected Steve Scalise as a new member of the United States House of Representatives, replacing Representative Bobby Jindal who resigned on January 14, 2008, to become Governor of Louisiana.

This election and Louisiana's 6th congressional district special election were the first Louisiana congressional elections not based on Louisiana's jungle primary since the 1970s.

== Democratic primary ==
=== Candidates ===
- Gilda Reed, psychologist and professor
- Vinny Mendoza, United States Air Force veteran, unsuccessful Democratic gubernatorial candidate in 2007

=== Results ===
Democratic primary results
Party	Candidate	Votes	%
Democratic	Gilda Reed	11,727	69.75
Democratic	M. V. "Vinny" Mendoza	5,086	30.25
Total votes		16,813	100.00

== Republican primary ==
=== Candidates ===
- Steve Scalise, Louisiana State Senator and former Louisiana State Representative
- Tim Burns, Louisiana State Representative
- Ben Morris, Mayor of Slidell
- David Simpson, business owner and attorney

=== Results ===
Republican primary results
Party	Candidate	Votes	%
Republican	Steve Scalise	16,799	48.34
Republican	Tim Burns	9,631	27.72
Republican	Ben Morris	7,388	21.26
Republican	David Simpson	932	2.68
Total votes		34,750	100.00

Republican primary runoff results
Party	Candidate	Votes	%
Republican	Steve Scalise	19,338	58.08
Republican	Tim Burns	13,958	41.92
Total votes		33,296	100.00

== Independent candidates ==
- Anthony "Tony G" Gentile, oil refinery supervisor, unsuccessful independent gubernatorial candidate in 2007
- R. A. "Skip" Galan

== General election ==
=== Results ===
Louisiana's 1st congressional district special election, 2008
Party	Candidate	Votes	%
Republican	Steve Scalise	33,867	75.13
Democratic	Gilda Reed	10,142	22.50
Independent	R. A. Galan	786	1.74
Independent	Anthony Gentile	280	0.62
Total votes		45,075	100.00
Republican hold			

== See also ==
- List of special elections to the United States House of Representatives
