= Don Cazayoux =

American lawyer and politician (born 1964)

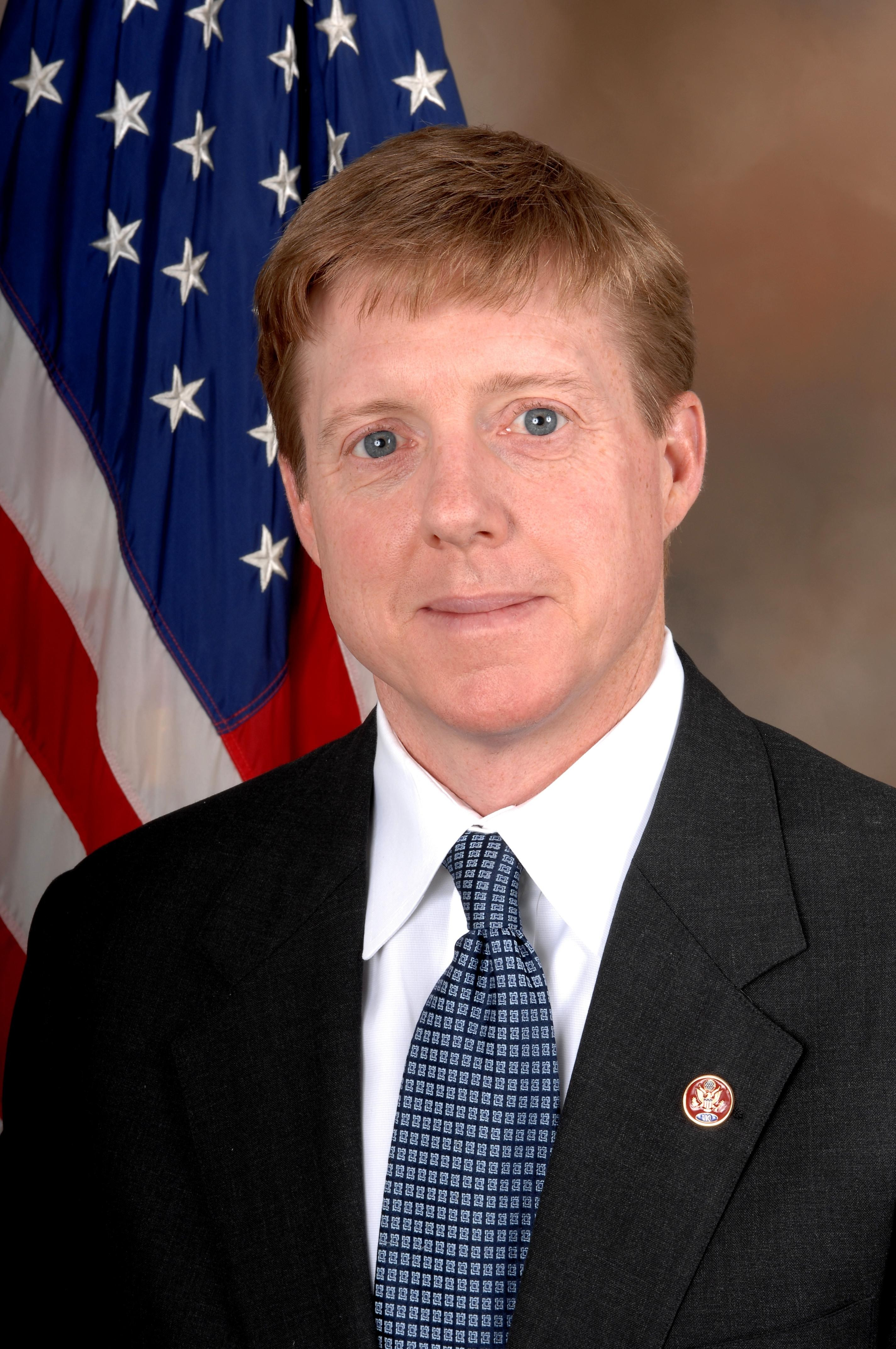
- Official portrait, 2008

United States Attorney for the Middle District of Louisiana
- In office June 22, 2010 – July 1, 2013
- President: Barack Obama
- Preceded by: David Dugas
- Succeeded by: J. Walter Green

Member of the U.S. House of Representatives from Louisiana's 6th district
- In office May 3, 2008 – January 3, 2009 (Note: Cazayoux's official service begins on the date of the special election, while he was not sworn in until May 6, 2008.)
- Preceded by: Richard Baker
- Succeeded by: Bill Cassidy

Member of the Louisiana House of Representatives from the 18th district
- In office January 2000 – May 6, 2008
- Preceded by: Rob Marionneaux
- Succeeded by: Major Thibaut

Personal details
- Born: Donald Jules Cazayoux Jr. January 17, 1964 (age 62) New Roads, Louisiana, U.S.
- Party: Democratic
- Spouse: Cherie Chavanne (m. 1986)
- Children: 3
- Education: Louisiana State University (BS, MA); Georgetown University (JD)

Donald Jules Cazayoux Jr. (/ˈkæʒuː/ kah-ZHOO; born January 17, 1964) is an American lawyer and former politician. He served as the United States Attorney for the Middle District of Louisiana from 2010 to 2013. From 2008 to 2009, he was a Democratic United States Representative from Louisiana's 6th congressional district.

He won a special election held on May 3, 2008, to fill the seat vacated on Republican Congressman Richard H. Baker. He narrowly defeated Republican nominee Woody Jenkins and was sworn in on May 6, 2008. In the regularly scheduled general election held later that year, Cazayoux ran for re-election but was defeated by the Republican nominee, state Senator Bill Cassidy.

== Early life ==
A native of New Roads, Cazayoux is the son of Donald J. and Ann Cazayoux. His paternal grandparents were Jules Joseph Cazayoux Jr. (1914–2010), who was employed by the Southern Cotton Oil Company, and the late Ida Belle Glynn Cazayoux. A Roman Catholic, he graduated from the Catholic High School of Pointe Coupee in 1982. He earned his Bachelor of Arts degree from Louisiana State University in Baton Rouge and a Juris Doctor from Georgetown University in Washington, D.C. After finishing his studies, Cazayoux practiced law and then became a prosecutor for Pointe Coupee Parish. As an assistant district attorney under the 18th Judicial Court District Attorney, Richard "Ricky" Ward, Cazayoux never lost a jury trial.

== Political career ==
=== Louisiana Legislature ===
Cazayoux was first elected to the state legislature in 1999. He represented District 18, a heavily Democratic district that includes his home in Pointe Coupee Parish as well as Iberville, West Baton Rouge, and West Feliciana parishes. In the legislature, he became one of the few freshmen ever appointed to the powerful Appropriations Committee. He also worked for passage of laws to assist law enforcement in cracking down on child sexual predators.

=== U.S. House of Representatives ===
Cazayoux announced his candidacy for the 6th District shortly after Baker resigned. With the strong backing of the national party, he easily defeated fellow state representative Michael L. Jackson, who represents a portion of Baton Rouge, in the Democratic primary.

Cazayoux was the first Democrat to represent the 6th since four-term incumbent John Rarick was defeated in the 1974 Democratic primary. The seat was won that fall by Republican Henson Moore, who held it for twelve years before giving way to Baker in 1987.

Cazayoux lost his attempt for a full term in November 2008 to State Senator Bill Cassidy, who took 48 percent of the vote to Cazayoux's 40 percent. Jackson ran again, this time as an independent with funding from long-time Cassidy supporter Lane Grigsby. He finished third, garnering 36,133 votes, more than the 25,000-vote margin between Cassidy and Cazayoux, suggesting that he siphoned off many African-American votes that would have otherwise gone to Cazayoux and threw the election to Cassidy. The Daily Kingfish published photos of Jackson meeting with Congressman-elect Cassidy just three days after the election. Cazayoux was one of five incumbent House Democrats to be defeated in the 2008 congressional elections, along with Nancy Boyda (D-KS), William J. Jefferson (D-LA), Nick Lampson (D-TX), and Tim Mahoney (D-FL).

Cazayoux's 2008 campaign was endorsed by Democrats for Life of America.

=== Political positions ===
Cazayoux is considered a moderate-to-conservative Democrat, which is typical for most Louisiana Democrats outside New Orleans. He strongly opposes abortion and gun control.

He also supports expanding SCHIP, and favors withdrawing U.S. forces from Iraq. He calls himself "a John Breaux Democrat."

== Career after Congress ==
In April 2010, U.S. President Barack Obama nominated Cazayoux as United States Attorney for the Middle District of Louisiana, following a recommendation by U.S. Senator Mary Landrieu from May 2009. Cazayoux was unanimously confirmed by the United States Senate for the position on June 22, 2010.

In 2014, after stepping down as U.S. Attorney for the Middle District of Louisiana, Cazayoux announced the opening of the Cazayoux Ewing law offices in Baton Rouge and New Roads. Lane Ewing, a former assistant U.S. Attorney, is partnering with Cazayoux, who has also tapped former longtime assistant U.S. Attorney Stan Lemelle to join the firm.

== Personal life ==
Cazayoux is a former president of the New Roads branch of the Lions Club (2002–2003). He married Cherie Chavanne in 1986, and they have three children, Michael, Chavanne, and Katie. Cazayoux is a distant relative of the late Lindy Boggs, former US Representative and US Ambassador.

== Electoral history ==
Louisiana's 6th Congressional District Special Election (May 3, 2008)
Party	Candidate	Votes	%
Democratic	Don Cazayoux	49,703	49.20
Republican	Woody Jenkins	46,746	46.78
Independent	Ashley Casey	3,718	3.68
Independent	Peter J. Aranyosi	448	0.44
Constitution	Randall T. Hayes	402	0.40
Total votes		101,017	100.00
Turnout			
Democratic gain from Republican			

Louisiana's 6th Congressional District General Election (2008)
Party	Candidate	Votes	%
Republican	Bill Cassidy	150,332	48.12
Democratic	Don Cazayoux (incumbent)	125,886	40.29
Independent	Michael Jackson	36,198	11.59
Total votes		312,416	100.00
Turnout			
Republican gain from Democratic			

== See also ==
- 2008 Louisiana's 6th congressional district special election
- United States House of Representatives elections in Louisiana, 2008#District 6

U.S. House of Representatives
Preceded by Richard Baker	Member of the U.S. House of Representatives from Louisiana's 6th congressional district 2008–2009	Succeeded by Bill Cassidy
Legal offices
Preceded by David Dugas	United States Attorney for the Middle District of Louisiana; 2010–2013	Succeeded by J. Walter Green
U.S. order of precedence (ceremonial)
Preceded by Jean Spencer Ashbrook as Former U.S. Representative	Order of precedence of the United States as Former U.S. Representative	Succeeded by Vance McAllister as Former U.S. Representative
