= Irving R. Boudreaux =

American politician (1930–1989)

Member of the Louisiana House of Representatives
- In office 1968–1972

Personal details
- Born: December 15, 1930 Grand Point, Louisiana, U.S.
- Died: February 17, 1989 (aged 58) Baton Rouge, Louisiana, U.S.
- Party: Democratic

Irving R. Boudreaux (December 15, 1930 – February 17, 1989) was an American politician. He served as a Democratic member of the Louisiana House of Representatives.

== Life and career ==
Boudreaux was born in Grand Point, Louisiana.

In 1960 Boudreaux ran for Mayor of Baker, Louisiana along with four others including incumbent Henry G. Smith. He was a member of the East Baton Rouge Parish Public School Board.

In 1968, Boudreaux was elected to the Louisiana House of Representatives, serving until 1972.

In December 1972 he was indicted with three other state legislators on charges related to false declarations.

Boudreaux died in February 1989 in Baton Rouge, Louisiana, at the age of 58.
