= Jim McCrery =

American politician and lobbyist (born 1949)

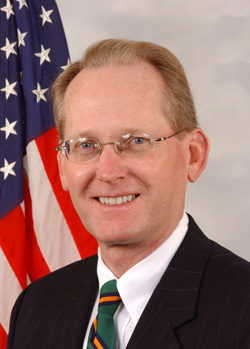

Ranking Member of the House Ways and Means Committee
- In office January 3, 2007 – January 3, 2009
- Preceded by: Charlie Rangel
- Succeeded by: Dave Camp

Member of the U.S. House of Representatives from Louisiana
- In office April 16, 1988 – January 3, 2009 (Note: McCrery's official service begins on the date of the special election, while he was not sworn in until April 26, 1988.)
- Preceded by: Buddy Roemer
- Succeeded by: John Fleming
- Constituency: 4th district (1988–1993); 5th district (1993–1997); 4th district (1997–2009)

Personal details
- Born: James Otis McCrery III; September 18, 1949 (age 76) Shreveport, Louisiana, U.S.
- Party: Democratic (before 1988); Republican (1988–present)
- Spouse: Mary Johnette Hawkins (divorced)
- Children: 2
- Education: Louisiana Tech University (BA); Louisiana State University (JD)
- McCrery's voice McCrery voicing concerns with reauthorizing the State Children's Health Insurance Program. Recorded September 25, 2007

James Otis McCrery III (born September 18, 1949) is an American lawyer, politician and lobbyist who served as a Republican member of the United States House of Representatives from 1988 to 2009. He represented the 4th District of Louisiana, based in the northwestern quadrant of the state.

McCrery was a ranking member on the House Ways and Means Committee. Had the Republicans maintained control of the U.S. House in 2007, he would have been in line to chair the Ways and Means Committee. Instead, the slot went to the veteran Democrat Charles Rangel of Harlem in New York City. He was also a member of the Executive Committee of the National Republican Congressional Committee and the Republican Main Street Partnership, a group of Moderate Republicans.

McCrery did not seek reelection in 2008 and was succeeded as Representative by John C. Fleming, a fellow Republican.

== Early life and career ==
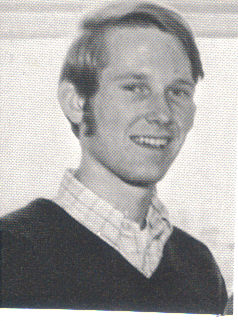
McCrery as president of the junior class at Louisiana Tech University

McCrery was born in Shreveport and reared in Leesville, the seat of Vernon Parish in western Louisiana. He graduated in 1967 from Leesville High School. In 1971, McCrery earned a Bachelor of Arts degree in both English and history from Louisiana Tech University in Ruston in Lincoln Parish. Thereafter in 1975, he obtained a degree from the Louisiana State University Paul M. Hebert Law Center in Baton Rouge. McCrery joined the law firm of Jackson, Smith & Ford in Leesville, where he worked from 1975 to 1978.

From January through August 1979, he was a staff member of U.S. Representative Buddy Leach, a Leesville native. McCrery resigned from Rep. Leach's staff in August 1979 to join the staff of the Shreveport City Attorney's office. After Leach was unseated in 1980 by Buddy Roemer of Bossier City, McCrery was hired as district manager and later legislative director for Representative Roemer. In 1984, McCrery returned to Louisiana to work for Georgia Pacific Corporation, a forest products company. He remained there until his election to Congress four years later.

== Congressional career ==
After Roemer resigned from Congress to become governor, McCrery ran for his former boss's seat as a Republican.

In 1992, Louisiana lost a district as a result of sluggish population growth during the 1980s. Also, the state was ordered, temporarily, to draw a second black-majority district by the Justice Department. The legislature responded by shifting most of Shreveport and Bossier City's black voters into a new 4th District that stretched in roughly a "Z" shape all the way to Baton Rouge. Most of McCrery's former territory was merged with the 5th District, represented by 16-year incumbent Democrat Jerry Huckaby, who is now retired in Lincoln Parish. On paper, McCrery was in serious danger, since Huckaby retained nearly all of his former territory. However, the new Fifth was significantly more urbanized than its predecessor because of the presence of Shreveport. McCrery retained 55 percent of his former constituents. Also, since the new 4th had absorbed most of the old 5th's blacks as well, the new 5th District was only 16 percent African American; the old 5th was 30 percent black. McCrery was thus such a heavy favorite that national Democratic leaders wrote off the seat as a loss and urged Huckaby to retire. Huckaby chose to stay in the race and was heavily defeated, carrying only one parish in the district. McCrery thus became the first Louisiana Republican to unseat a Democratic incumbent at the federal level.

McCrery was reelected seven more times with no substantive opposition and was completely unopposed in 1996, 1998, and 2004. His district was renumbered as the 4th again in 1997, after the United States Supreme Court ruled the 4th was an unconstitutional racial gerrymander.

In the mid-term election of 2006, McCrery defeated Democratic challengers Patti Cox and Artis Cash and Republican Chester T. "Catfish" Kelley.

From 2007 to 2009, McCrery was the ranking Republican on the House Ways and Means Committee. During the China–U.S trade talks of March 2007, McCrery and New York Democrat Charles Rangel accidentally insulted Chinese Vice Premier Wu Yi by referring to her as the Vice Premier of the "Republic of China" in a letter. The Republic of China is a name for the self-ruling government on the island of Taiwan, which the PRC considers a rogue province.

In 2007, in the early stages of the campaign for the Republican presidential nomination for 2008, McCrery announced his endorsement of candidate Mitt Romney, the former governor of Massachusetts for the party's nomination, a designation Romney won in 2012, not 2008.

On December 7, 2007, McCrery announced his decision not to seek reelection in 2008. Closed primaries were held by both parties in the fall of 2008 to begin the process of choosing a successor to McCrery. In the Republican primary, physician John C. Fleming of Minden in Webster Parish, beat McCrery's preferred successor, Jeff R. Thompson, a Bossier City attorney.

== Subcommittees and laws ==
Congressman McCrery sat on the following House Ways and Means subcommittees:

- Health Select Revenue Measures (Chairman)
- Human Resources
- Social Security (chairman)

McCrery sponsored or cosponsored six public bills in the 109th Congress that have been signed into law by the president, all of which involved disaster mitigation and assistance in response to 2005 hurricanes Katrina, Rita, and Wilma.

== Post-Congressional career ==
In January 2009, McCrery joined a top lobbying firm, Capitol Counsel in Washington, D.C. He is the lead Republican in the company. Among his clients is General Electric.

== Family and personal life ==
On August 3, 1991, McCrery married the former Mary Johnette Hawkins (born December 1966), a Republican, a former television newswoman and communications specialist from Shreveport. The couple has two sons, Scott and Otis McCrery. The McCrerys subsequently divorced.

McCrery is a United Methodist.

In August 2014, Governor Bobby Jindal, who once worked as a summer intern on McCrery's congressional staff, appointed McCrery to fill the vacancy created by the resignation of John George, a Shreveport physician, to the influential Louisiana State University Board of Supervisors.

U.S. House of Representatives
Preceded by Buddy Roemer	Member of the U.S. House of Representatives from Louisiana's 4th congressional district 1988–1993	Succeeded by Cleo Fields
Preceded by Jerry Huckaby	Member of the U.S. House of Representatives from Louisiana's 5th congressional district 1993–1997	Succeeded by John Cooksey
Preceded by Cleo Fields	Member of the U.S. House of Representatives from Louisiana's 4th congressional district 1997–2009	Succeeded by John Fleming
Preceded by Charlie Rangel	Ranking Member of the House Ways and Means Committee; 2007–2009	Succeeded by Dave Camp
U.S. order of precedence (ceremonial)
Preceded by Richard Baker as Former U.S. Representative	Order of precedence of the United States as Former U.S. Representative	Succeeded by Philip Sharp as Former U.S. Representative
