= Richard Baker (American politician) =

American politician (born 1948)

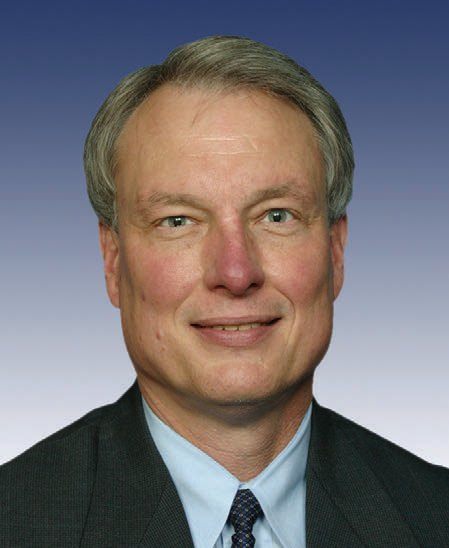

Member of the U.S. House of Representatives from Louisiana's 6th district
- In office January 3, 1987 – February 2, 2008
- Preceded by: Henson Moore
- Succeeded by: Don Cazayoux

Member of the Louisiana House of Representatives from the East Baton Rouge Parish district
- In office 1972–1987
- Preceded by: Irving R. Boudreaux; Richard Cheek; Carl Dawson; Smokey Delaroderie; Chris Faser; Eugene Webb McGehee; Lillian Walker
- Succeeded by: Michael McCleary

Personal details
- Born: Richard Hugh Baker; May 22, 1948 (age 78) New Orleans, Louisiana, U.S.
- Party: Democratic (before 1986); Republican (1986-present)
- Spouse: Kay Baker
- Education: Louisiana State University (BA)

Richard Hugh Baker (born May 22, 1948) is an American politician and lobbyist. He served as a member of the United States House of Representatives from 1987 to 2008, representing the 6th district of Louisiana as a Republican.

== Early life and career ==
The son of a Methodist minister, Baker was born in New Orleans and graduated from Louisiana State University in Baton Rouge. He stayed in Baton Rouge after graduation and founded a real estate agency there. In 1971, just a year out of school, he was elected to the Louisiana House of Representatives as a Democrat from a predominantly blue-collar district in Baton Rouge and served eight terms. He became chairman of the Transportation Committee.

== Congressional career ==
In 1986, Baker switched to the Republicans because of a long-running feud with Governor Edwin Edwards. Soon afterwards, 6th District Republican congressman Henson Moore, announced that he was running for the Senate seat being vacated by the retiring Russell B. Long. (Moore was defeated in that race by 7th District Democratic congressman John Breaux). Moore encouraged Baker to run for the seat, which is based in Baton Rouge and includes most of that city's suburbs. Baker (51 percent) defeated Democrats Thomas H. Hudson (45 percent) and Willis Blackwell, Sr.(4 percent). He became the fourth Republican to represent Louisiana in Congress since Reconstruction and the second to win an undisputed victory in a contested election. He was reelected without opposition in 1988 and 1990. Baker quickly compiled a standard Republican voting record, in marked contrast to his Democratic roots, as evidenced by Baker's lifetime rating of 0.5 from Americans for Democratic Action, a progressive think tank.

In 1992, however, Louisiana lost a congressional seat as a result of reapportionment after the 1990 Census. Clyde C. Holloway of Forest Hill in Rapides Parish, who had represented the Alexandria-based 8th District, was placed into Baker's district. Holloway had been elected along with Baker in 1986. Holloway led in the jungle primary with 37 percent. Baker received 33 percent and Democrat Ned Randolph, then the mayor of Alexandria, received 30 percent. In the November general election, Holloway won 15 of the district's 17 parishes. Baker, however, crushed Holloway in the two largest parishes, Livingston Parish and his home base, East Baton Rouge Parish. This was enough to defeat Holloway by some 2,700 votes overall.

After being unopposed in 1994 and 1996, in 1998 Baker faced Marjorie McKeithen, daughter of longtime Republican Louisiana secretary of state W. Fox McKeithen and granddaughter of Democratic former governor John McKeithen. Court-ordered redistricting before the 1996 elections had drawn considerably more blacks into the district than Baker had previously represented. Amid a nationwide backlash against Republicans for what was seen as overzealous behavior during the impeachment of Bill Clinton, Baker just barely held onto his seat by about one thousand votes, narrowly avoiding a runoff. He had a much easier time in 2000, winning 68 percent of the vote. Redistricting took some Democratic voters out of his district, including part of Pointe Coupee Parish, which helped Baker win against no major-party opposition in 2002 and two weak Democrats in 2004. In 2006, his only challenger was Libertarian Richard M. Fontanesi, and Baker won with 82 percent of the vote.

Baker was a former chairman of the House Financial Services Capital Markets Subcommittee, and served as its ranking Republican from 2007 to 2008. He was also a member of the Transportation and Infrastructure Committee and United States House Committee on Veterans' Affairs.

=== Hurricane Katrina ===
According to The Wall Street Journal, Baker caused some controversy in the aftermath of Hurricane Katrina when he was overheard telling lobbyists: "We finally cleaned up public housing in New Orleans. We couldn't do it, but God did." Baker, a longtime critic of the Housing Authority of New Orleans and the living conditions in New Orleans public housing, confirmed the quote and explained that his comment reflected his hope that the storm will provide an opportunity to move New Orleans's poor from decrepit public housing and into clean and safe housing.

In the aftermath of Hurricanes Katrina and Rita, Baker proposed a plan to rebuild Louisiana. Commonly known as "The Baker Plan," Baker introduced legislation to create the Louisiana Recovery Corporation. The LRC would have been initially financed by the issuance of federal government bonds and would use the funds to buy properties from homeowners and business in the most devastated areas of the state. The LRC would then clean the property and sell clean titles to developers, who would then redevelop the properties in accordance with plans developed by the local governments and civic groups. The proceeds of the sales to the developers would have been used to repay the bonds used to initial finance the LRC, paying the government back for their initial loan. The homeowners would have had the option to accept the buyout and walk away, accept the buyout and retain an option to return, or refuse to sell and repair their property themselves. On the advice of Recovery Tsar Donald E. Powell, President Bush killed the LRC when he publicly announced his opposition to the bill.

=== Resignation ===
On January 15, 2008, Baker announced his intention to resign from Congress to take a lobbying position with the Managed Funds Association. He left office on February 2, 2008. This triggered a special election, won by Democrat Don Cazayoux, who defeated Republican and former Democrat Woody Jenkins. Cazayoux was defeated in the regular election later in 2008 by Republican Bill Cassidy, who later became the state's senior U.S. senator.

== See also ==
- List of American politicians who switched parties in office

U.S. House of Representatives
Preceded by Henson Moore	Member of the U.S. House of Representatives from Louisiana's 6th congressional district 1987–2008	Succeeded by Don Cazayoux
U.S. order of precedence (ceremonial)
Preceded by Tim Ryan as Former U.S. Representative	Order of precedence of the United States as Former U.S. Representative	Succeeded by Jim McCrery as Former U.S. Representative
