= Joseph E. Ransdell =

American attorney and politician (1858–1954)

Joseph Eugene Ransdell
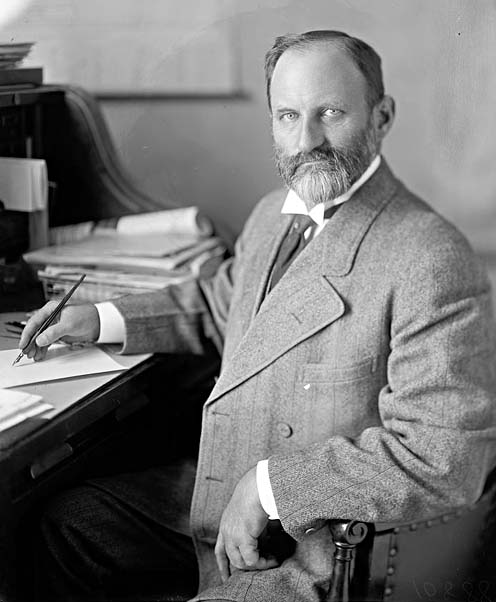

United States Senator from Louisiana
- In office March 4, 1913 – March 3, 1931
- Preceded by: Murphy J. Foster
- Succeeded by: Huey Long

Member of the U.S. House of Representatives from Louisiana's 5th district
- In office August 29, 1899 – March 3, 1913
- Preceded by: Samuel Thomas Baird
- Succeeded by: James Walter Elder

Personal details
- Born: October 7, 1858 Alexandria, Louisiana, U.S.
- Died: July 27, 1954 (aged 95) Lake Providence, Louisiana, U.S.
- Resting place: Lake Providence Cemetery
- Party: Democratic
- Spouse: Olive Irene Powell Ransdell (married 1885-1935, her death)
- Relations: Francis Xavier Ransdell (brother) Frank Voelker Sr. (nephew by marriage); John Martin Hamley (nephew by marriage) David Voelker (great-great-nephew)
- Occupation: Attorney; farmer; real estate

Joseph Eugene Ransdell (October 7, 1858 – July 27, 1954) was an attorney and politician from Louisiana. Beginning in 1899, he was elected for seven consecutive terms as United States representative from Louisiana's 5th congressional district. He subsequently served for three terms in the United States Senate from Louisiana before being defeated in the 1930 Democratic primary for the seat by Governor Huey Long.

== Background ==
Born in Alexandria in Rapides Parish in central Louisiana, Ransdell attended public schools. He was Roman Catholic by birth. In 1882, he graduated from Union College in Schnectady, New York. He returned to Louisiana to read the law with an established firm, and was admitted to the bar in 1883.

He practiced from 1883 to 1889 in Lake Providence in East Carroll Parish. Ransdell's law partner during the 1880s was his younger brother, Francis Xavier Ransdell, who years later was elected as a judge of the Louisiana 6th Judicial District Court.

Joseph Ransdell served as district attorney for the 8th Judicial District of Louisiana for 15 years, from 1884 to 1896. He also had a plantation, where he cultivated cotton and pecan groves. From 1896 to 1899, he served on the Fifth Levee District Board. In 1898, he was a member of the state constitutional convention.

== House and Senate ==
In 1899, Ransdell was elected as a Democrat to the Fifty-sixth Congress to fill the vacancy created by the death of Samuel Thomas Baird. He won his first full term in Congress in 1900, having defeated the Republican businessman Henry E. Hardtner of Urania in La Salle Parish, 6,172 votes (90.8 percent) to 628 (9.2 percent). Hardtner was the last Republican to contest the seat until 1976, when Frank Spooner of Monroe waged a strong but losing challenge to the Democrat Jerry Huckaby of Ringgold in Bienville Parish. By 1910, Hardtner had switched to Democratic affiliation and served for two years in the Louisiana House of Representatives as the first member ever from La Salle Parish. From 1924 to 1928, Hardtner was a state senator.

Ransdell served in the House from August 29, 1899, to March 3, 1913. He was not a candidate for renomination in 1912, having instead been elected by the Louisiana State Legislature to the United States Senate, prior to the passage of the Seventeenth Amendment to the United States Constitution. In 1918, he defeated future U.S. Senator John H. Overton of Alexandria in a disputed vote. Ransdell won his third term in the Democratic primary election in 1924, having defeated Lee Emmett Thomas, the mayor of Shreveport, 104,312 (54.9 percent) to 85,54 (45.1 percent). Huey Pierce Long Jr., while himself running for a second term on the regulatory Louisiana Public Service Commission spent more time supporting Ransdell for the Senate than he did his own campaign in which he carried all twenty-eight parishes in his district. Long was particularly motivated by his fierce opposition to Mayor Thomas though Long was then a resident of Shreveport.

Ransdell was a US senator from March 4, 1913, to March 3, 1931. But in 1930 Governor Huey Long ran in the Democratic primary against him for the seat and won. With 149,640 votes (57.3 percent), Long toppled Randsell, who polled 111,451 (42.7 percent). Long was elected in the general election without Republican opposition.

Ransdell had appeared in 1927 at a Long political rally in Lake Providence, where his younger brother introduced Long. District Attorney Jefferson B. Snyder, another long-term advocate of planter interests, sat on the stage. Snyder had not really favored Long so much as he was convinced that Long would defeat his chief opponent, U.S. Representative Riley J. Wilson, the favorite of most planter interests, and Snyder wanted to influence the new governor. At the rally, Huey Long began "a harangue that castigated their closest friends and political allies and the old establishment itself, of which these men were a part." Particularly outraged at Long's treatment of the Randsdells was state Senator Norris C. Williamson of East Carroll Parish, the vice-president of the Constitutional League of Louisiana. He would not compromise with the Longs and retired to private life in 1932, rather than face likely defeat by the Long faction.

T. H. Harris, the long-term Louisiana state superintendent of education, called Ransdell "one of the most lovable and distinguished citizens of the United States. [Yet] the people elected Long to the Senate because they believe that he can be of more use to them there. The people trust Long. I find it mighty easy to get on with Governor Long. I have seen the school appropriations increased by $1.9 million during the past two years. .."

Ransdell was chairman of the Committee on Public Health and National Quarantine (Sixty-third through Sixty-fifth Congresses) and a member of the Committee on Mississippi River and Its Tributaries (Sixty-sixth Congress). It was in this capacity that Ransdell sponsored the Ransdell Act, which created the National Institutes of Health.

== Later years and legacy ==
In 1920, Ransdell founded a printing firm in Washington, D.C., at a time when members of Congress could run businesses while serving in office. When his Senate tenure ended in 1931, Ransdell returned to Lake Providence to engage in real estate and growing cotton and pecans. He was a member of the board of supervisors of Louisiana State University at Baton Rouge from 1940 to 1944 during the administration of Governor Sam H. Jones. Ransdell died in Lake Providence and is interred there at Lake Providence Cemetery. At the time of his death, he was the last living Senator to have been elected by a state legislature.

Ransdell was a great-uncle of Frank Voelker Jr., a Lake Providence attorney who chaired the former Louisiana State Sovereignty Commission during the administration of Governor Jimmie Davis and then ran unsuccessfully for governor in the 1963 Democratic gubernatorial primary, withdrawing before the balloting. Frank Voelker Sr., judge of the Sixth Judicial District from 1937 until his death in 1963, was married to Ransdell's niece, Isabel, and was hence a son-in-law of Judge Francis Ransdell.

Ransdell's great-great nephew was the New Orleans entrepreneur and philanthropist David Ransdell Voelker. Following Hurricane Katrina, Democratic Governor Kathleen Babineaux Blanco named David Voelker to the Louisiana Recovery Authority. Blanco's successor and past opponent, Republican Bobby Jindal, elevated Voelker as chairman of the authority. In 2008, though he had been identified previously as a "longtime, diehard Republican", David Voelker was the largest donor in Louisiana to Democrat Barack H. Obama of Illinois, having given the then neophyte presidential candidate $80,000, (~$114,099 in 2024) according to the nonpartisan OpenSecrets in Washington, D.C.

Ransdell named the community of Elmwood southwest of Lake Providence, where he owned much of the land, for his boyhood plantation in Rapides parish. In 1976, more than thirty years after Ransdell's death, St. Patrick's Roman Catholic Church in Lake Providence moved into a new building on a lot which the former senator had willed to the congregation. The new location at 207 Scarborough Street, is directly across the street from the earlier structure where Ransdell and his family had long worshiped.

A biography of Ransdell was written in 1951 by Adras LaBorde, long-time managing editor of the Alexandria Daily Town Talk.

Party political offices
First	Democratic nominee for U.S. Senator from Louisiana (Class 2); 1918, 1924	Succeeded by Huey Long
U.S. House of Representatives
Preceded by Samuel Thomas Baird	Member of the U.S. House of Representatives from Louisiana's 5th congressional district August 29, 1899 – March 3, 1913	Succeeded by James Walter Elder
U.S. Senate
Preceded by Murphy J. Foster Sr.	U.S. senator (Class 2) from Louisiana; March 4, 1913 – March 3, 1931; Served alongside: John Thornton, Robert F. Broussard, Walter Guion, Edward Gay, Edwin Broussard	Succeeded by Huey Long
Honorary titles
Preceded by Robert Owen	Oldest living U.S. senator July 19, 1947 – July 27, 1954	Succeeded by Lawrence Phipps
