= Frank Morey =

American politician

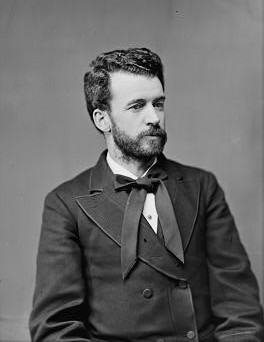

Member of the U.S. House of Representatives from Louisiana's 5th district
- In office March 4, 1869 – June 8, 1876
- Preceded by: W. Jasper Blackburn
- Succeeded by: William B. Spencer

Member of the Louisiana House of Representatives
- In office 1868–1869

Personal details
- Born: Frank Morey; July 11, 1840 Boston, Massachusetts, U.S.
- Died: September 22, 1890 (aged 50) Washington, DC, U.S.
- Party: Republican
- Profession: planter and insurance

Military service
- Branch/service: United States Army
- Years of service: 1861–1865

Frank Morey (July 11, 1840 – September 22, 1890) was an American planter, politician, and soldier in the Union Army (1861–1865), reaching the rank of colonel; afterward he moved to Louisiana, where he became a planter and sold insurance. He was elected as a U.S. representative from Louisiana, serving from 1869 to 1876. His election in 1876 was contested, and he lost his seat in June of that year to Democrat William B. Spencer. Afterward, Morey moved to Washington, D.C., where he practiced law.

== Biography ==
Born in Boston, Massachusetts, Morey attended the public schools. At the age of 17, he moved to Illinois.

== Civil War ==
He studied law, but at the onset of the American Civil War he entered the Union Army in 1861 in the Thirty-third Regiment, Illinois Volunteer Infantry, and served until the close of the war.

== Postbellum ==
After the war, Morey settled in Louisiana in 1866. He engaged in cotton planting and the insurance business.

He was elected as a Republican member of the State house of representatives in 1868 and 1869. He was appointed as a commissioner to revise the statutes and codes of the State under Reconstruction, to reflect national constitutional amendments granting freedmen citizenship and the right to vote. He served as commissioner to the Vienna Exposition in 1873.

Morey was also elected in 1868 as a Republican to the Forty-first Congress, winning re-election and serving in the Forty-second and Forty-third congresses. He served from 1869 to 1876.

He presented his credentials as a Member-elect to the Forty-fourth Congress as well, but it was contested by his Democratic opponent, William B. Spencer. Morey's election was overturned by Congress in June 1876, and Spencer took the seat. The Democrats also regained control of the Louisiana state legislature that year, in an election marked by violence as the White League worked to suppress black voting. In 1877 federal troops were withdrawn from the state with the end of Reconstruction.

Morey moved to Washington, D.C., and practiced law. He died there September 22, 1890. He was interred in the Congressional Cemetery.

== See also ==
U.S. House of Representatives
Preceded by W. Jasper Blackburn	Member of the U.S. House of Representatives from Louisiana's 5th congressional district March 4, 1869 – June 8, 1876	Succeeded by William B. Spencer
