= James Walter Elder =

American politician

James W. Elder

Member of the U.S. House of Representatives from Louisiana's 5th district
- In office March 4, 1913 – March 3, 1915
- Preceded by: Joseph E. Ransdell
- Succeeded by: Riley J. Wilson

State Representative from Catahoula Parish
- In office 1900–1904
- Preceded by: Henry Breithaupt
- Succeeded by: E. B. Cottingham

Personal details
- Born: James Walter Elder; October 5, 1882 Grand Prairie, Texas, U.S.
- Died: December 16, 1941 (aged 59) Ruston, Louisiana, U.S.
- Resting place: Greenwood Cemetery in Ruston, Louisiana
- Party: Democratic
- Education: Baylor University
- Occupation: Attorney

James Walter Elder (October 5, 1882 – December 16, 1941) was an American lawyer and politician who served one-term as a United States representative for Louisiana's 5th congressional district from 1913 to 1915.

== Biography ==
A native of Grand Prairie, Texas, James W. Elder attended the public schools and from 1895 to 1901 Baylor University in Waco, Texas. He later studied law, was admitted to the bar in 1903, and commenced practice in Farmerville in Union Parish, Louisiana.

=== Early career ===
Elder served as mayor of Farmerville before he moved to Monroe in Ouachita Parish to continue his legal practice.

=== Politics ===
He was a member of the Louisiana State Senate for one term from 1908 to 1912 and was elected as a Democrat to the Sixty-third Congress, in which he served from March 4, 1913, to March 3, 1915. He was defeated for renomination in 1914 by Riley J. Wilson.

=== Later career and death ===
After leaving Congress, Elder returned to the practice of law in Farmerville. On January 1, 1925, he relocated to Ruston, where he continued the practice of law until his death on December 16, 1941.

He is interred at Greenwood Cemetery in Ruston.

U.S. House of Representatives
Preceded by Joseph E. Ransdell	Member of the U.S. House of Representatives from Louisiana's 5th congressional district 1913–1915	Succeeded by Riley J. Wilson
