= Samuel T. Baird =

American politician (1861–1899)

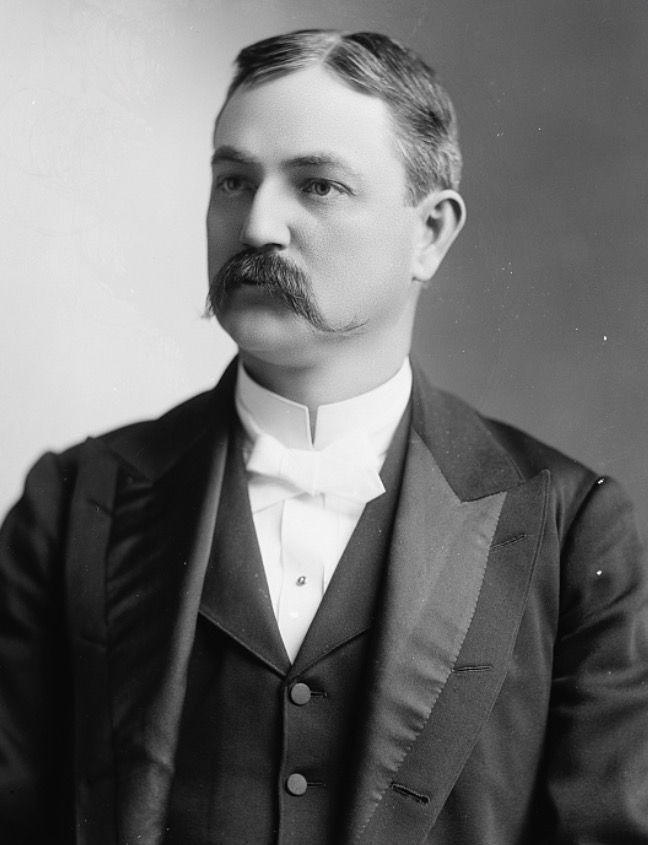
- Portrait of Baird by Charles Milton Bell, taken between February 1894 and February 1901

Member of the U.S. House of Representatives from Louisiana's 5th district
- In office March 4, 1897 – April 22, 1899
- Preceded by: Charles J. Boatner
- Succeeded by: Joseph E. Ransdell

Member of the Louisiana Senate
- In office 1896

Personal details
- Born: Samuel Thomas Baird; May 5, 1861 Oak Ridge, Louisiana, US
- Died: April 22, 1899 (aged 37) Washington, D.C., US
- Party: Democratic
- Occupation: Politician, lawyer

Samuel Thomas Baird (May 5, 1861 – April 22, 1899) was an American politician and lawyer. A Democrat, he was a member of the United States House of Representatives from Louisiana from 1897 to 1899.

== Biography ==
Baird was born on May 5, 1861, in Oak Ridge, Louisiana. Educated by private tutors, he studied at Vincennes University. He read law, and in 1882, was admitted to the bar, after which he began practicing law in Bastrop. From 1884 to 1888, he was district attorney of the 6th Louisiana district court, then served as its judge from 1888 to 1892. He afterwards returned to practicing law.

Baird was a Democrat. In 1896, he was a member of the Louisiana State Senate. In the State Senate, he was chairman of the Committee on Railroads, as well as a member of the Committees on Elections, on the Judiciary, and on Lands and Levees. He was also chairman of the joint Democratic Caucus of the Louisiana State Legislature.

Baird was a delegate to the 1896 Democratic National Convention. He was a member of the United States House of Representatives, from March 4, 1897, until his death early into the 56th United States Congress, representing Louisiana's 5th district. Ideologically, he was liberal. He was for free silver.

Baird was married and had a child; his marriage taking place while serving in Congress. He was a member of the Freemasons and the Knights of Pythias. He died on April 22, 1899, aged 37, in Washington, D.C., from endocarditis and rheumatism, and was buried at Christ Church Cemetery, in Bastrop. His funeral was the largest known to have taken place in Bastrop.

== See also ==
- List of members of the United States Congress who died in office (1790–1899)

U.S. House of Representatives
Preceded by Charles J. Boatner	Member of the U.S. House of Representatives from Louisiana's 5th congressional district 1897–1899	Succeeded by Joseph E. Ransdell
