= Charles E. McKenzie =

American politician

Charles Edgar McKenzie
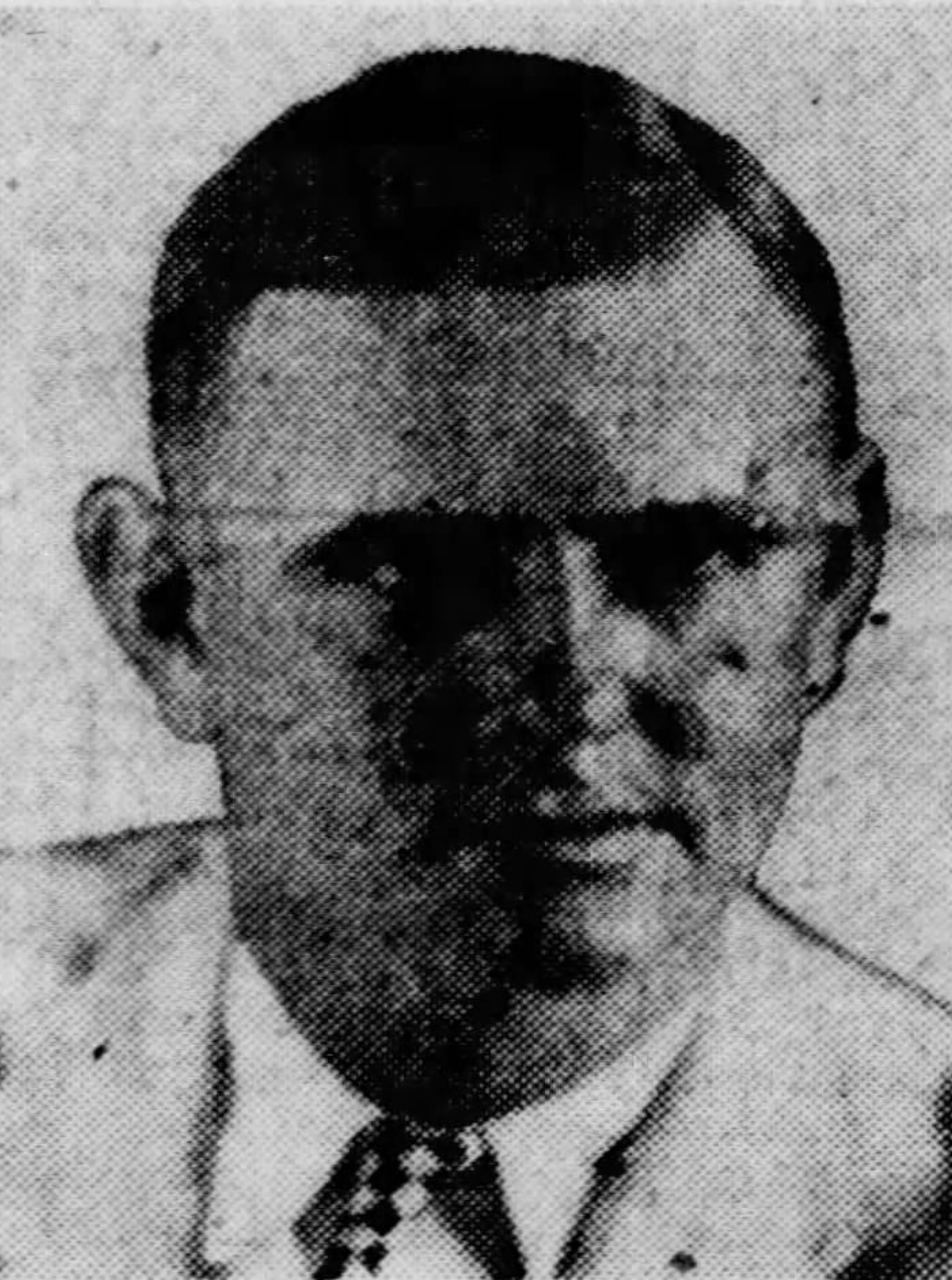

Member of the U.S. House of Representatives from Louisiana's 5th district
- In office January 3, 1943 – January 3, 1947
- Preceded by: Newt V. Mills
- Succeeded by: Otto Passman

Personal details
- Born: Charles Edgar Mckenzie; October 3, 1896 Pelican, DeSoto Parish, Louisiana, USA
- Died: June 7, 1956 (aged 59) Monroe, Louisiana
- Resting place: Riverview Cemetery in Monroe
- Party: Democratic
- Education: Louisiana State University
- Occupation: Businessman

Military service
- Branch/service: United States Army
- Battles/wars: Mexican border patrol; World War I

Charles Edgar Mckenzie (October 3, 1896 – June 7, 1956) was an American oilman, World War I veteran, and politician who served two terms as a U.S. representative from Louisiana's 5th congressional district from 1943 to 1947.

== Biography ==
Born in tiny Pelican in DeSoto Parish in northwestern Louisiana, McKenzie attended public schools in Monroe in Ouachita Parish and Louisiana State University in Baton Rouge.

=== World War I ===
He volunteered for service in the Louisiana National Guard and was stationed on the Mexican border in 1916, when U.S. president Woodrow Wilson sent General John J. Pershing in an unsuccessful attempt to capture the bandit Pancho Villa. During World War I, McKenzie was mustered into the United States Army on April 1, 1917, and commissioned a second lieutenant in the 156th Infantry, which saw service overseas in the 39th and 89th divisions from June 1918, to September 1919.

=== Early career ===
From 1919 to 1921, McKenzie engaged in petroleum drilling at Wichita Falls and nearby Burkburnett, Texas. He returned to Monroe and operated businesses relating to oil, natural gas, finance-brokerage, trucking, and insurance. He also had agricultural pursuits.

From 1940 to 1942, McKenzie served as executive assistant director in the former Louisiana Department of Highways, now the Louisiana Department of Transportation and Development. Thereafter, he was the director of planning, housing, and aeronautics in the Louisiana Department of Public Works in 1942 and 1943. Both assignments were during the administration of Governor Sam H. Jones, a figure in the anti-Long faction.

=== Congress ===
In 1943, McKenzie challenged incumbent congressman Newt V. Mills for the Democratic nomination and won by a small margin. The election results were challenged by Mills. Ultimately, Mills dropped the challenge and conceded to McKenzie. McKenzie was elected as a Democrat to the 78th and 79th Congresses (January 3, 1943–January 3, 1947). McKenzie was an unsuccessful candidate for renomination in 1946, having lost to Otto E. Passman, a favorite of the Long faction.

=== Later career and death ===
McKenzie then resumed supervision of his business enterprises in Monroe, where he died at the age of fifty-nine. He is interred there at Riverview Cemetery.

U.S. House of Representatives
Preceded by Newt V. Mills	Member of the U.S. House of Representatives from Louisiana's 5th congressional district 1943–1947	Succeeded by Otto Passman
