= Cherubusco Newton =

American politician (1848–1910)

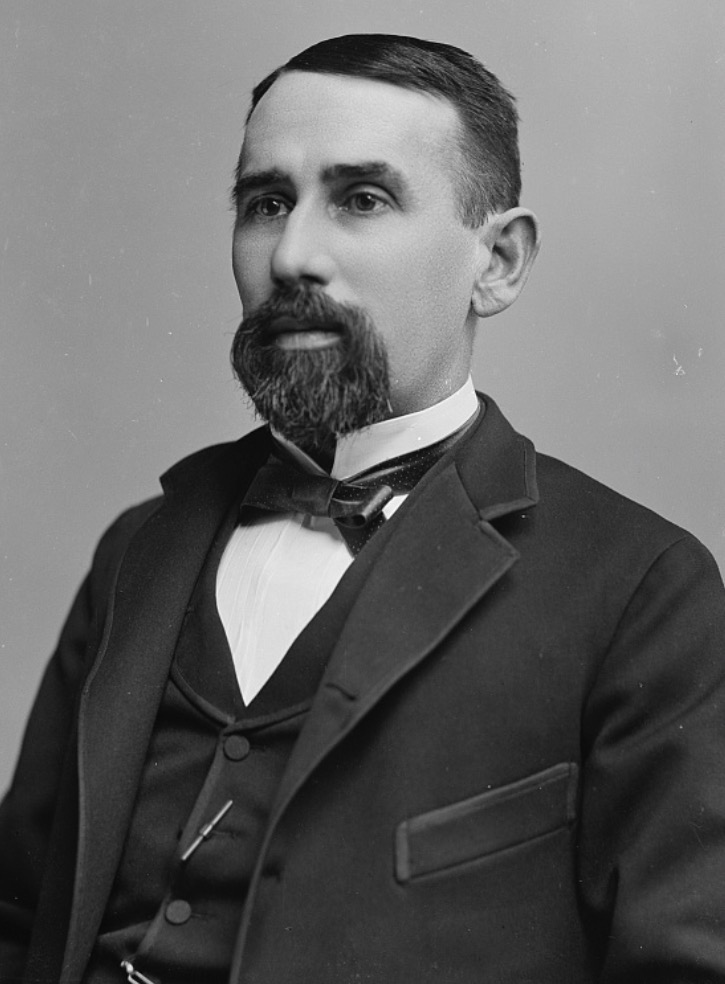
- Portrait of Newton by Charles Milton Bell, taken between 1873 and 1890

Member of the U.S. House of Representatives from Louisiana's 5th district
- In office March 4, 1887 – March 3, 1889
- Preceded by: J. Floyd King
- Succeeded by: Charles J. Boatner

Member of the Louisiana State Senate
- In office 1879–1883

Personal details
- Born: May 15, 1848 Greensburg, Louisiana, US
- Died: May 26, 1910 (aged 62)
- Resting place: New Cemetery, Bastrop, Louisiana, US
- Party: Democratic
- Education: Louisiana State University
- Profession: Politician, lawyer

Cherubusco Newton (May 15, 1848 – May 26, 1910) was an American lawyer and politician. A Democrat, he was a member of the United States House of Representatives from Louisiana from 1887 to 1889.

== Biography ==
Newton was born on May 15, 1848, in Greensburg, Louisiana. Educated at public schools in Bastrop, he studied at the Louisiana State University. He then worked as an educator, studying law and being admitted to the bar in 1870, after which he began practicing law in Bastrop.

Newton was a Democrat. From 1879 to 1883, he was a member of the Louisiana House of Representatives. He declined an appointment as judge in 1885. He was a member of the United States House of Representatives, from March 4, 1887, to March 3, 1889, representing Louisiana's 5th district. He was not nominated for the following election. The New Orleans States coined the term "Newtonising" to describe short-lived, high-ranking careers, such as that of Newton's single term as representative. He was a delegate to the 1888 Democratic National Convention. Ideologically, he was liberal. He supported the Mills Tariff Bill of 1888 and authored an anti-trust bill, also in 1888. He supported land grants for railroad construction.

After serving in Congress, Newton returned to practicing law in Bastrop. He later moved to Monroe, practicing law there until his death. He died on May 26, 1910, aged 62, and was buried at New Cemetery, in Bastrop. His son, Cherubusco Jr., served in the United States Navy and was stationed on USS Standish.

U.S. House of Representatives
Preceded by J. Floyd King	Member of the U.S. House of Representatives from Louisiana's 5th congressional district 1887–1889	Succeeded by Charles J. Boatner
