= W. Jasper Blackburn =

American printer, publisher and politician (1820–1899)

William Jasper Blackburn
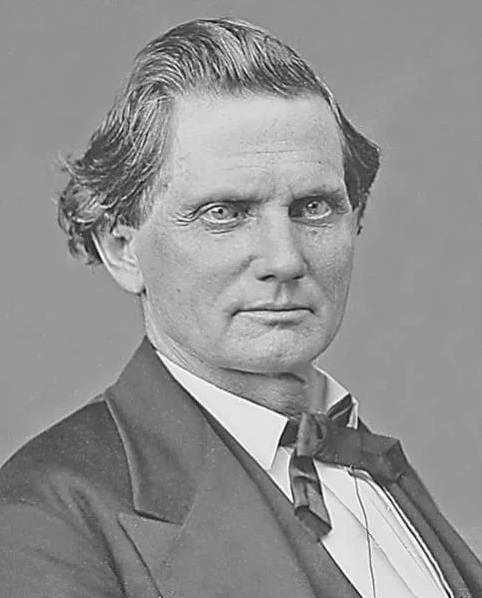
- Mathew Brady photo circa 1868

Member of the U.S. House of Representatives from Louisiana's 5th district
- In office July 18, 1868 – March 3, 1869
- Preceded by: District established
- Succeeded by: Frank Morey

Member of the Louisiana State Senate from Claiborne Parish
- In office 1874–1878

Mayor of Minden, Louisiana
- In office May 1855 – May 1856
- Succeeded by: A. B. George

Personal details
- Born: July 24, 1820 Randolph County, Arkansas, U.S.
- Died: November 10, 1899 (aged 79) Little Rock, Arkansas, U.S.
- Resting place: Mount Holly Cemetery
- Party: Republican
- Other political affiliations: Democratic
- Occupation: Newspaper publisher and printer
- (1) Publisher Blackburn switched his party affiliation to Republican because he opposed slavery and the secession of the Confederate States of America. (2) Blackburn was spared conviction — and automatic execution — by a one-vote margin of charges that he printed counterfeit Confederate currency. (3) After the return of Democratic Redeemer government in Louisiana in 1878, Blackburn soon returned to his native Arkansas, where he published the short-lived Arkansas Republican newspaper. (4) Blackburn served in the United States House of Representatives and the Louisiana State Senate as a Republican; earlier he was a Democratic mayor of Minden, Louisiana, from 1855 to 1856. (5) Blackburn launched the first paper to bear the name Minden Herald.

William Jasper Blackburn (July 24, 1820 – November 10, 1899) was an American printer, publisher and politician who served in the United States House of Representatives from northwestern Louisiana from July 18, 1868, to March 3, 1869. A Republican during Reconstruction, he was elected to the Louisiana State Senate, serving from 1874 to 1878.

== Biography ==
Blackburn was born on July 24, 1820, in Fouche de Mau, Randolph County, Arkansas, where he was homeschooled by his mother. In 1839, he moved to Batesville, Arkansas, to be train in the printing trade. He traveled to continue learning the trade; Little Rock in 1845; Fort Smith in 1846; and Minden, Louisiana in 1849, where he established the Minden Herald; Homer, Louisiana in 1859, where he established the Homer Iliad.

In 1867, Blackburn became a member of the Louisiana State constitutional convention, and was county judge of Claiborne Parish, Louisiana for four years. Upon the readmission of the State of Louisiana, he was elected as a Republican to the Fortieth Congress. He served from July 18, 1868, to March 3, 1869. He was not eligible for re-nomination during the 1868 elections. Instead he ran unsuccessfully for the Republican nomination for lieutenant governor. He lost to African American Oscar Dunn, who was elected to the second position on the Henry Clay Warmoth ticket.

After a four-year stint in the Louisiana Senate, Blackburn returned in 1880 to Little Rock, Arkansas, where he published the Arkansas Republican from 1881 to 1884 and The Free South from 1885 to 1892. He died in Little Rock and is interred there in Mount Holly Cemetery.

U.S. House of Representatives
Preceded by District created	Member of the U.S. House of Representatives from Louisiana's 5th congressional district July 18, 1868 – March 3, 1869	Succeeded by Frank Morey
