= John E. Leonard =

American judge and U.S. Representative (1845–1877)

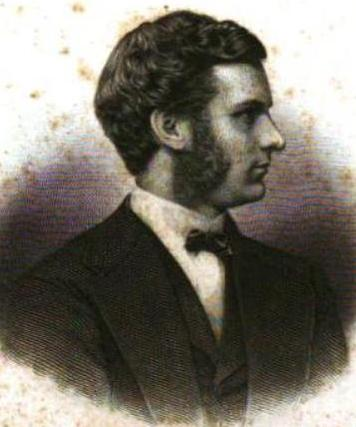

Member of the U.S. House of Representatives from Louisiana's 5th district
- In office March 4, 1877 – March 15, 1878
- Preceded by: William B. Spencer
- Succeeded by: J. Smith Young

Personal details
- Born: John Edwards Leonard; September 22, 1845 Fairville, Pennsylvania, U.S.
- Died: March 15, 1878 (aged 32) Havana, Cuba
- Resting place: Middletown Township, Delaware County, Pennsylvania, U.S.
- Party: Republican
- Relatives: John Edwards (granduncle)
- Education: Phillips Exeter Academy; Harvard University
- Profession: Politician, lawyer

John Edwards Leonard (September 22, 1845 – March 15, 1878) was a United States representative from Louisiana. He was the grandnephew of John Edwards, who also served in Congress. He was born in Fairville, Pennsylvania, into a Quaker family.

Leonard attended public schools and was later graduated from Phillips Exeter Academy, Exeter, New Hampshire in 1863. He earned a law degree from Harvard University in 1867. He studied law in Germany before he returned to the United States; he moved to Louisiana, where he was admitted to the bar in 1870 during the Reconstruction era and commenced practice at Monroe, Louisiana.

Leonard was appointed as the district attorney of the thirteenth judicial district of Louisiana in 1871 and 1872. He was elected associate justice of the Louisiana Supreme Court in 1876 before he resumed the practice of law in Monroe, Louisiana.

In 1876 he was elected as a Republican to the Forty-fifth Congress, serving from March 4, 1877, until his death the following year in Havana, Cuba. He was vacationing with several other Washington leaders and died on March 15, 1878. He was buried in the Friends’ (Hicksite) Cemetery of the Middletown Meeting House, Middletown Township, Delaware County, Pennsylvania.

== See also ==
- List of members of the United States Congress who died in office (1790–1899)

U.S. House of Representatives
Preceded by William B. Spencer	Member of the U.S. House of Representatives from Louisiana's 5th congressional district March 4, 1877 – March 15, 1878	Succeeded by J. Smith Young
