= Louisiana's 5th congressional district =

U.S. House district for Louisiana

Coordinates: 31.7664°N 91.8236°W

- Interactive map of district boundaries
- Representative: Julia Letlow; R–Start
- Distribution: 51.65% rural; 48.35% urban
- Population (2025): 777,868
- Median household income: $62,025
- Ethnicity: 62.3% White; 27.5% Black; 4.9% Hispanic; 3.2% Two or more races; 1.5% Asian; 0.6% other
- Cook PVI: R+18

Louisiana's 5th congressional district is a congressional district in the U.S. state of Louisiana. The 5th district encompasses rural northeastern Louisiana and much of central Louisiana, as well as the northern part of Louisiana's Florida parishes in southeastern Louisiana, taking in Monroe, Amite and Bogalusa.

In 2013, six-term Representative Rodney Alexander resigned to take a state cabinet post; in the special election, Republican newcomer Vance McAllister, a businessman from Swartz, Louisiana, handily defeated fellow Republican State Senator Neil Riser of Columbia in Caldwell Parish to claim the seat in a special election. McAllister beat Riser, 54,449 (59.7) to 36,837 (40.3 percent).

Analysts considered McAllister's victory as a rejection of Governor Bobby Jindal's efforts to have the seat vacated and to replace Alexander with his hand-picked candidate in a low-turnout special election. The runoff turnout was less than 19%, three percent less than in the primary.

In 2014, Ralph Abraham defeated Monroe Mayor Jamie Mayo for the 113th United States Congress, replacing McAllister, who was defeated in the Louisiana primary. On February 26, 2020, Abraham announced he would not be seeking re-election for a fourth term, honoring his pledge to only serve three terms in Congress.

The district is currently represented by Republican Julia Letlow, who was elected in a 2021 special election to replace her husband, representative-elect Luke, who died of COVID-19 days before he was set to be sworn in.

As part of the 2024 map redistricting, the 5th loses Lincoln, Jackson, Winn, Grant, Rapides, and half of Ouachita Parishes to the 4th district, and also Pointe Coupee and half of Avoyelles Parish to the new 6th; in exchange, 5th gains parts of East Baton Rouge, Tangipahoa and Livingston Parishes. The new territory includes two of the state's largest universities, Louisiana State (LSU) in Baton Rouge and Southeastern Louisiana (SLU) in Hammond.

== Parishes and communities ==
For the 119th and successive Congresses (based on the districts drawn following a 2023 court order), the district contains all or portions of the following parishes and communities.

Ascension Parish (1)

Prairieville (part; also 2nd)

Avoyelles Parish (6)

Bordelonville, Center Point, Fifth Ward, Hessmer, Mansura (part; also 6th), Marksville

Caldwell Parish (4)

All four communities

Catahoula Parish (4)

All four communities

Concordia Parish (7)

All seven communities

East Baton Rouge Parish (9)

Baton Rouge (part; also 6th), Central, Inniswold, Oak Hills Place, Old Jefferson, Shenandoah, Village St. George, Westminster, Zachary (part; also 6th)

East Carroll Parish (1)

Lake Providence

East Feliciana Parish (5)

All five communities

Franklin Parish (4)

All four communities

LaSalle Parish (7)

All seven communities

Livingston Parish (7)

Albany, Denham Springs, French Settlement, Livingston, Port Vincent, Walker, Watson

Madison Parish (4)

All four communities

Morehouse Parish (5)

All five communities

Ouachita Parish (8)

Bawcomville, Brownsville, Calhoun, Lakeshore, Monroe (part; also 4th), Richwood, Swartz, West Monroe (part; also 4th)

Richland Parish (4)

All four communities

St. Helena Parish (2)

Greensburg, Montpelier

Tangipahoa Parish (8)

Amite City, Hammond (part; also 1st), Independence, Kentwood, Natalbany, Roseland, Tangipahoa, Tickfaw

Tensas Parish (3)

All three communities

Washington Parish (5)

All five communities

West Carroll Parish (5)

All five communities

West Feliciana Parish (1)

St. Francisville

== Recent election results from statewide races ==
Year	Office	Results
2008	President	McCain 66% - 32%
2012	President	Romney 66% - 34%
2014	Senate	Cassidy 64% - 36%
2015	Governor	Bel Edwards 53% - 47%
2015	Lt. Governor	Nungesser 56% - 44%
2016	President	Trump 66% - 31%
2016	Senate	Kennedy 69% - 31%
2019	Governor	Rispone 54% - 46%
2019	Lt. Governor	Nungesser 74% - 26%
2019	Attorney General	Landry 73% - 27%
2020	President	Trump 66% - 32%
2023	Attorney General	Murrill 73% - 27%
2024	President	Trump 67% - 31%

== List of members representing the district ==
Member	Party	Years	Cong ress	Electoral history	Location
District created March 4, 1863
Vacant		March 4, 1863 – July 18, 1868	38th 39th 40th	Civil War and Reconstruction	
W. Jasper Blackburn (Homer)	Republican	July 18, 1868 – March 3, 1869	40th	Elected to finish the vacant term. Retired to run for Lieutenant Governor.	
Frank Morey (Monroe)	Republican	March 4, 1869 – June 8, 1876	41st 42nd 43rd 44th	Elected in 1868. Re-elected in 1870. Re-elected in 1872. Re-elected in 1874. Lost contested election.	
William B. Spencer (Vidalia)	Democratic	June 8, 1876 – January 8, 1877	44th	Won contested election. Retired and resigned to become associate justice of the Louisiana Supreme Court.	
Vacant		January 8, 1877 – March 3, 1877	44th		
John E. Leonard (Lake Providence)	Republican	March 4, 1877 – March 15, 1878	45th	Elected in 1876. Died.	
Vacant		March 15, 1878 – November 5, 1878	45th		
J. Smith Young (Homer)	Democratic	November 5, 1878 – March 3, 1879	45th	Elected to finish Leonard's term. Retired.	
J. Floyd King (Vidalia)	Democratic	March 4, 1879 – March 3, 1887	46th 47th 48th 49th	Elected in 1878. Re-elected in 1880. Re-elected in 1882. Re-elected in 1884. Lost renomination.	
Cherubusco Newton (Bastrop)	Democratic	March 4, 1887 – March 3, 1889	50th	Elected in 1886. Lost renomination.	
Charles J. Boatner (Monroe)	Democratic	March 4, 1889 – March 20, 1896	51st 52nd 53rd 54th	Elected in 1888. Re-elected in 1890. Re-elected in 1892. Re-elected in 1894. House declared seat vacant after election was contested by Alexis Benoit.	
Vacant		March 20, 1896 – June 10, 1896	54th		
Charles J. Boatner (Monroe)	Democratic	June 10, 1896 – March 3, 1897	54th	Elected to finish his own term. Retired.	
Samuel T. Baird (Bastrop)	Democratic	March 4, 1897 – April 22, 1899	55th 56th	Elected in 1896. Re-elected in 1898. Died.	
Vacant		April 22, 1899 – August 29, 1899	56th		
Joseph E. Ransdell (Lake Providence)	Democratic	August 29, 1899 – March 3, 1913	56th 57th 58th 59th 60th 61st 62nd	Elected to finish Baird's term. Re-elected in 1900. Re-elected in 1902. Re-elected in 1904. Re-elected in 1906. Re-elected in 1908. Re-elected in 1910. Retired to run for U.S. senator.	
James Walter Elder (Monroe)	Democratic	March 4, 1913 – March 3, 1915	63rd	Elected in 1912. Lost renomination.	
Riley J. Wilson (Ruston)	Democratic	March 4, 1915 – January 3, 1937	64th 65th 66th 67th 68th 69th 70th 71st 72nd 73rd 74th	Elected in 1914. Re-elected in 1916. Re-elected in 1918. Re-elected in 1920. Re-elected in 1922. Re-elected in 1924. Re-elected in 1926. Re-elected in 1928. Re-elected in 1930. Re-elected in 1932. Re-elected in 1934. Lost renomination.	
Newt V. Mills (Monroe)	Democratic	January 3, 1937 – January 3, 1943	75th 76th 77th	Elected in 1936. Re-elected in 1938. Re-elected in 1940. Lost renomination.	
Charles E. McKenzie (Monroe)	Democratic	January 3, 1943 – January 3, 1947	78th 79th	Elected in 1942. Re-elected in 1944. Lost renomination.	
Otto Passman (Monroe)	Democratic	January 3, 1947 – January 3, 1977	80th 81st 82nd 83rd 84th 85th 86th 87th 88th 89th 90th 91st 92nd 93rd 94th	Elected in 1946. Re-elected in 1948. Re-elected in 1950. Re-elected in 1952. Re-elected in 1954. Re-elected in 1956. Re-elected in 1958. Re-elected in 1960. Re-elected in 1962. Re-elected in 1964. Re-elected in 1966. Re-elected in 1968. Re-elected in 1970. Re-elected in 1972. Re-elected in 1974. Lost renomination.	
Jerry Huckaby (Ringgold)	Democratic	January 3, 1977 – January 3, 1993	95th 96th 97th 98th 99th 100th 101st 102nd	Elected in 1976. Re-elected in 1978. Re-elected in 1980. Re-elected in 1982. Re-elected in 1984. Re-elected in 1986. Re-elected in 1988. Re-elected in 1990. Lost re-election.	
Jim McCrery (Shreveport)	Republican	January 3, 1993 – January 3, 1997	103rd 104th	Redistricted from the 4th district and re-elected in 1992. Re-elected in 1994. Redistricted to the 4th district.	
John Cooksey (Monroe)	Republican	January 3, 1997 – January 3, 2003	105th 106th 107th	Elected in 1996. Re-elected in 1998. Re-elected in 2000. Retired to run for U.S. senator.	
Rodney Alexander (Quitman)	Democratic	January 3, 2003 – August 9, 2004	108th 109th 110th 111th 112th 113th	Elected in 2002. Re-elected in 2004. Re-elected in 2006. Re-elected in 2008. Re-elected in 2010. Re-elected in 2012. Resigned to become Secretary of the Louisiana Department of Veterans Affairs.	2003–2013
Rodney Alexander (Quitman)	Republican	August 9, 2004 – September 26, 2013	108th 109th 110th 111th 112th 113th	Elected in 2002. Re-elected in 2004. Re-elected in 2006. Re-elected in 2008. Re-elected in 2010. Re-elected in 2012. Resigned to become Secretary of the Louisiana Department of Veterans Affairs.	2003–2013
Rodney Alexander (Quitman)	Republican	August 9, 2004 – September 26, 2013	108th 109th 110th 111th 112th 113th	Elected in 2002. Re-elected in 2004. Re-elected in 2006. Re-elected in 2008. Re-elected in 2010. Re-elected in 2012. Resigned to become Secretary of the Louisiana Department of Veterans Affairs.	2013–2023
Vacant		September 26, 2013 – November 16, 2013	113th		2013–2023
Vance McAllister (Swartz)	Republican	November 16, 2013 – January 3, 2015	113th	Elected to finish Alexander's term. Lost re-nomination.	2013–2023
Ralph Abraham (Alto)	Republican	January 3, 2015 – January 3, 2021	114th 115th 116th	Elected in 2014. Re-elected in 2016. Re-elected in 2018. Retired.	2013–2023
Vacant		January 3, 2021 – April 14, 2021	117th	Representative-elect Luke Letlow died December 29, 2020.	2013–2023
Julia Letlow (Start)	Republican	April 14, 2021 – present	117th 118th 119th	Elected to finish her husband's term. Re-elected in 2022. Re-elected in 2024. Retired to run for U.S. Senate.	2013–2023
Julia Letlow (Start)	Republican	April 14, 2021 – present	117th 118th 119th	Elected to finish her husband's term. Re-elected in 2022. Re-elected in 2024. Retired to run for U.S. Senate.	2023–2025
Julia Letlow (Start)	Republican	April 14, 2021 – present	117th 118th 119th	Elected to finish her husband's term. Re-elected in 2022. Re-elected in 2024. Retired to run for U.S. Senate.	2025–present

== Recent election results ==
=== 2002 ===
Louisiana's 5th Congressional District Runoff Election (2002)
Party	Candidate	Votes	%
Democratic	Rodney Alexander (Incumbent)	86,718	50.28
Republican	Lee Fletcher	85,744	49.72
Total votes		172,462	100.00
Democratic hold			

=== 2004 ===
Louisiana's 5th Congressional District Election (2004)
Party	Candidate	Votes	%
Republican	Rodney Alexander (Incumbent)	141,495	59.44
Democratic	Zelma "Tisa" Blakes	58,591	24.61
Republican	John W. "Jock" Scott	37,971	15.95
Total votes		238,057	100.00
Republican gain from Democratic			

- NOTE: Rodney Alexander switched from the Democratic to the Republican Party.

=== 2006 ===
Louisiana's 5th Congressional District Election (2006)
Party	Candidate	Votes	%
Republican	Rodney Alexander (incumbent)	78,211	68.26
Democratic	Gloria Williams Hearn	33,233	29.00
Libertarian	Brent Sanders	1,876	1.64
Independent	John Watts	1,262	1.10
Total votes		114,582	100.00
Republican hold			

=== 2008 ===
Louisiana's 5th Congressional District Election (2008)
Party	Candidate	Votes	%
Republican	Rodney Alexander (incumbent)		100.00
Total votes			100.00
Republican hold			

=== 2010 ===
Louisiana's 5th Congressional District Election (2010)
Party	Candidate	Votes	%
Republican	Rodney Alexander (incumbent)	122,033	78.57
Independent	Tom Gibbs Jr.	33,279	21.43
Total votes		155,312	100.00
Republican hold			

=== 2012 ===
Louisiana's 5th Congressional District Election (2012)
Party	Candidate	Votes	%
Republican	Rodney Alexander (incumbent)	202,536	77.83
No Party	"Ron" Ceasar	37,486	14.41
Libertarian	Clay Steven Grant	20,194	7.76
Total votes		260,216	100.0
Republican hold			

=== 2013 (special) ===
Louisiana's 5th Congressional District Special Election (2013)
Party	Candidate	Votes	%
Republican	Vance McAllister	54,449	59.65
Republican	Neil Riser	36,837	40.35
Total votes		91,286	18.9
Republican hold			

=== 2014 ===
Louisiana's 5th Congressional District Election (2014)
Party	Candidate	Votes	%
Democratic	Jamie Mayo	67,611	28.22
Republican	Ralph Abraham	54,449	22.73
Republican	"Zach" Dasher	53,628	22.39
Republican	Vance M. McAllister	26,606	11.11
Republican	Clyde C. Holloway	17,877	7.46
Republican	Harris Brown	9,890	4.13
Republican	"Ed" Tarpley	4,594	1.92
Libertarian	Charles Saucier	2,201	0.92
Green	Eliot S. Barron	1,655	0.69
Total votes		239,551	100
Turnout			52.6

Louisiana's 5th Congressional District Election (2014 Runoff)
Party	Candidate	Votes	%
Republican	Ralph Abraham	134,616	64.22
Democratic	Jamie Mayo	75,006	35.78
Total votes		209,622	100
Turnout			45.2
Republican hold			

=== 2016 ===
Louisiana's 5th Congressional District Election (2016 Primary)
Party	Candidate	Votes	%
Republican	Ralph Abraham	208,545	81.57
Republican	Billy Burkette	47,117	18.43
Total votes		255,662	100
Turnout			66.8
Republican hold			

=== 2018 ===
Louisiana's 5th Congressional District Election (2018 Primary)
Party	Candidate	Votes	%
Republican	Ralph Abraham	149,018	66.54
Democratic	Jessee Carlton Fleenor	67,118	29.97
Independent	Billy Burkette	4,799	2.14
Libertarian	Kyle Randol	3,011	1.35
Total votes		223,946	100.00
Republican hold			

=== 2020 ===
Louisiana's 5th Congressional District Election (2020 Primary)
Party	Candidate	Votes	%
Republican	Luke Letlow	102,533	33.12
Republican	Lance Harris	51,240	16.55
Democratic	Sandra "Candy" Shoemaker-Christophe	50,812	16.41
Democratic	Martin Lemelle Jr.	32,186	10.40
Republican	Scotty Robinson	23,887	7.72
Republican	Allen Guillory Sr.	22,496	7.27
Republican	Matt Hasty	9,834	3.18
Democratic	Phillip Snowden	9,432	3.05
Democratic	Jesse P. Lagarde	7,136	2.30
Total votes		309,556	100.0

Louisiana's 5th Congressional District Election (2020 Runoff)
Party	Candidate	Votes	%
Republican	Luke Letlow	49,182	62.02
Republican	Lance Harris	30,124	37.98
Total votes		79,306	100.0
Republican hold			

=== 2021 (special) ===
Louisiana's 5th Congressional District Special Election (2021)
Party	Candidate	Votes	%
Republican	Julia Letlow	67,203	64.86
Democratic	Sandra "Candy" Christophe	28,255	27.27
Republican	Chad Conerly	5,497	5.31
Republican	Robert Lansden	929	0.90
Republican	Allen Guillory	464	0.45
No party preference	Jim Davis	402	0.39
Republican	Sancha Smith	334	0.32
Republican	M.V. "Vinny" Mendoza	236	0.23
Independent	Jaycee Magnuson	131	0.13
Republican	Richard H. Pannell	67	0.06
Republican	Horace Melton III	62	0.06
Republican	Errol Victor Sr.	36	0.03
Total votes		103,616	100.00
Republican hold			

=== 2022 ===
Louisiana's 5th Congressional District Election (2022)
Party	Candidate	Votes	%
Republican	Julia Letlow (incumbent)	151,080	67.6
Democratic	Oscar "Omar" Dantzler	35,149	15.7
Democratic	Walter Earl Huff	19,383	8.7
Republican	Allen Guillory	12,159	5.4
Republican	Hunter Pullen	5,782	2.6
Total votes		223,553	100.0
Republican hold			

=== 2024 ===
2024 Louisiana's 5th congressional district election
Party	Candidate	Votes	%
Republican	Julia Letlow (incumbent)	201,037	62.9
Democratic	Michael Vallien Jr.	82,981	25.9
Republican	Vinny Mendoza	35,833	11.2
Total votes		319,851	100.0
Republican hold			

== See also ==
- Louisiana's congressional districts
- List of United States congressional districts
