= Charles J. Boatner =

American politician

Charles Jahleal Boatner
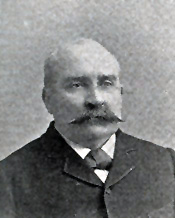

Member of the Louisiana State Senate
- In office 1876 – May 1878

Member of the U.S. House of Representatives from Louisiana's 5th district
- In office March 4, 1889 – March 20, 1896
- In office June 10, 1896 – March 3, 1897
- Preceded by: Cherubusco Newton
- Succeeded by: Samuel T. Baird

Personal details
- Born: January 23, 1849 Columbia, Louisiana, U.S.
- Died: March 21, 1903 (aged 54) New Orleans, Louisiana, U.S.
- Resting place: Monroe Cemetery, Monroe, Louisiana, U.S.
- Party: Democratic

Charles Jahleal Boatner (January 23, 1849 – March 21, 1903) was a U.S. representative from Louisiana.

Born in Columbia in Caldwell Parish, Louisiana, Boatner completed preparatory studies and the law. He was admitted to the bar in 1870. He was a member of the Louisiana State Senate from 1876 until May 1878.

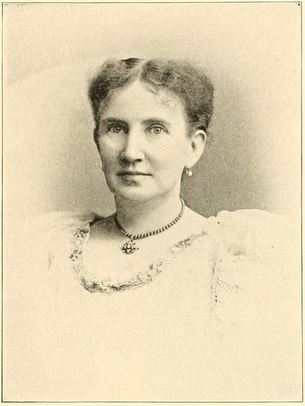
Frances Rowena Mayo

He married Frances Rowena Mayo, the daughter of Oren Mayo and Deborah J. Spencer, of Louisiana. Her father moved from Watertown, N. Y., to Louisiana, about 1840. Frances Rowena Mayo descended from Revolutionary parentage. Her grandfather was an officer in the War of 1812, and his grandfather in the Revolution. The family emigrated from England, not exactly on the Mayflower, but very soon thereafter. Her grandfather on her mother's side — George Spencer — was a Virginian, whose father was also an officer in the Revolutionary army. One of his sisters was the wife of General Lewis Cass and another of General Hunt, of Toledo, Ohio. Her father, Judge Oren Mayo, filled a number of offices in the State of Louisiana, having been successively Member of the State Legislature, State Senator, and for many years District and Circuit Judge. One of her uncles, Judge W. B. Spencer, was a Member of Congress from the Fifth District of Louisiana, and afterward one of the Associate Justices of the Supreme Court of Louisiana. Frances Rowena Mayo married Hon. C. J. Boatner on the 27th of December, 1870. They had five children — four sons and one daughter, Annie Josephine Boatner.

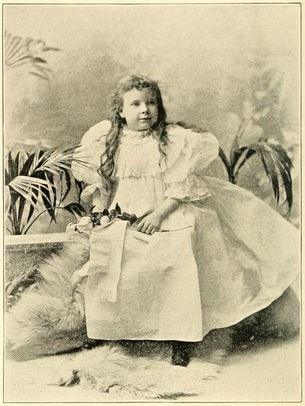
Annie Josephine Boatner

Boatner was elected as a Democrat to the Fifty-first, Fifty-second, and Fifty-third Congresses (March 4, 1889 – March 3, 1895). Presented credentials as a Member-elect to the Fifty-fourth Congress but on March 20, 1896, the House declared the seat vacant, the election having been contested by Alexis Benoit.

In 1893, Boatner obtained a United States Navy appointment at the customhouse in New Orleans for State Representative Jefferson B. Snyder of Madison Parish.

Boatner was elected to fill the vacancy caused by the House declaring the seat vacant and served from June 10, 1896, to March 3, 1897. He declined to be a candidate for reelection in 1896. Instead he moved to New Orleans to resume the practice of law. He died there on March 21, 1903, and is interred at Monroe Cemetery, in Monroe, Louisiana.

U.S. House of Representatives
Preceded by Cherubusco Newton	Member of the U.S. House of Representatives from Louisiana's 5th congressional district 1889–1897	Succeeded by Samuel T. Baird
