= Otto Passman =

American politician

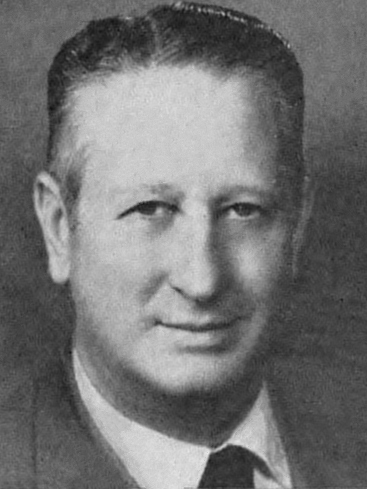
- Passman, c. 1971

Member of the U.S. House of Representatives from Louisiana's 5th district
- In office January 3, 1947 – January 3, 1977
- Preceded by: Charles E. McKenzie
- Succeeded by: Jerry Huckaby

Personal details
- Born: Otto Ernest Passman; June 27, 1900 Franklinton, Louisiana, U.S.
- Died: August 13, 1988 (aged 88) Monroe, Louisiana, U.S.
- Party: Democratic
- Spouse(s): Willie Lenora Bateman (m. c. 1920, died 1984) Martha Kathryn Williams (m. 1984)
- Education: Soule Business College
- Occupation: Appliance businessman; politician

Military service
- Allegiance: United States
- Branch: United States Navy
- Years of service: 1942–1944
- Rank: lieutenant commander
- Conflict: World War II

Otto Ernest Passman (June 27, 1900 – August 13, 1988) was an American politician who served in the United States House of Representatives for Louisiana's 5th congressional district from 1947 until 1977. As a congressman, Passman chaired the House Appropriations Subcommittee on Foreign Operations where he was a well-known opponent of foreign aid spending. He was made the subcommittee chair in his fifth term by Appropriations Committee Chair Clarence Cannon. He made himself an unchallengeable authority on foreign assistance programs, which he substantially reduced to the chagrin of Presidents Eisenhower, Kennedy, and Johnson. Then he would defend his reduced program against any further cuts. He was dominant in foreign aid until the death of Cannon in 1964, when he lost control of his subcommittee.

Passman was born on June 27, 1900, in Franklinton, Louisiana, the son of Ed and Pheriby (née Carrier) Passman. Passman graduated from Soule Business College in 1929, and engaged in the manufacture and sale of appliances. He married Willie Lenora Bateman in the early 1920s, and she died in 1984. He married his secretary, Martha Kathryn Williams (1926–2005), later that year in Arlington, Virginia.

Passman served in the United States Navy during World War II from 1942 until 1944 as a matériel and procurement officer in the States. After the war ended, Passman ran for Congress against two-term incumbent Charles E. McKenzie in the 1946 Democratic primary. Passman won by 455 votes. During Passman's time in Congress, winning the Democratic primary in Louisiana was tantamount to election; Passman never had a Republican opponent. Four times he was unopposed in the primary. Passman was accused of influence peddling in the time leading up to the 1976 Primary. Jerry Huckaby challenged Passman in that election and defeated him by a 53% to 47% margin.

During his tenure, Passman was one of only three Representatives who voted to reject the Judiciary Committee's report on the Watergate scandal following Nixon's resignation; Passman joined Earl Landgrebe and Sonny Montgomery as the three opposed compared to 412 in favor.

In his last years in office, Passman was sued for firing his deputy administrative assistant, Shirley Davis. When terminating Davis, Passman wrote that "it was essential that the understudy to my Administrative Assistant be a man." Davis alleged a violation of the Due Process Clause of the Fifth Amendment due to discrimination on the basis of sex. This raised a question of whether the earlier Bivens case, which authorized direct enforcement of the Fourth Amendment against federal officers, could also be expanded to other constitutional amendments. The Supreme Court determined in Davis v. Passman that Davis had a claim under Bivens and remanded the case for further hearing. Passman settled with the plaintiff.

After leaving Congress, Passman was charged with taking $273,000 from Tongsun Park while in Congress and was found not guilty after a trial in Monroe.

U.S. House of Representatives
Preceded by Charles E. McKenzie	Member of the U.S. House of Representatives from Louisiana's 5th congressional district 1947–1977	Succeeded by Jerry Huckaby
