= J. Smith Young =

American lawyer

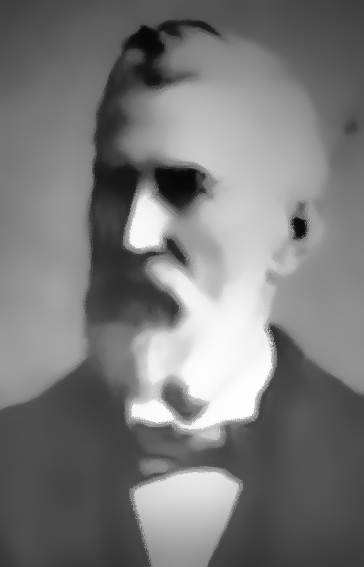

Member of the U.S. House of Representatives from Louisiana's 5th district
- In office November 5, 1878 – March 3, 1879
- Preceded by: John E. Leonard
- Succeeded by: J. Floyd King

Personal details
- Born: John Smith Young; November 4, 1834 Wake County, North Carolina
- Died: October 11, 1916 (aged 81) Shreveport, Louisiana
- Resting place: Oakland Cemetery
- Party: Democratic
- Spouse(s): Mattie Hamilton Young; Frances Rhoda Hodges Young
- Education: Centenary College
- Profession: Lawyer

Military service
- Allegiance: Confederate States of America
- Branch/service: Confederate States Army
- Rank: Second Lieutenant
- Unit: 31st Louisiana Infantry
- Battles/wars: American Civil War

John Smith Young (November 4, 1834 – October 11, 1916) was an American lawyer and Civil War veteran who served briefly as a member of the U.S. House of Representatives from Louisiana from 1878 to 1879.

== Early life ==
John Smith Young is the sixth of thirteen children born to Dr. John Y. Young (1793-1868) and Eliza Henry Jones (1807-1882). Though born in Wake County, North Carolina, he grew up on family cotton plantations in the frontier borderland area of Fayette County, Tennessee (Lagrange postal area), and Marshall County, Mississippi (Lamar postal area). Circa 1847, following the death of John's older sister, Cornelia (1827-1847), Dr. John Y. Young moved his family westward to several locales in southern Arkansas.

In the early 1850s, John attended Washington Male Seminary in Washington, Arkansas, where his older brother, Edwin Young, was on the faculty. John studied classic literature in their original languages—Greek, Latin, French, and English. Thereafter, Young attended Centenary College at its original location in Jackson, Louisiana, and graduated in 1855.

=== Lawyer ===
He studied law, was admitted to the state bar, and started his career as an attorney-of-law in Homer, Claiborne Parish, Louisiana. The 1860 United States federal census lists John S. Young as an attorney in Homer.

=== Civil War ===
On August 21, 1861, Young enlisted in Louisiana's 31st Infantry to serve in the Confederate Army during the American Civil War. He rose to the rank of lieutenant.

== Later life ==
After the war, Young returned to his law practice and married Mattie Hamilton, with whom he had all his children. He was elected or appointed to several public offices: in 1870, a parish (Claiborne Parish) judge; in 1872, a member of the Louisiana House of Representatives, and in 1876, a state judge. In 1878, Young was elected as a Democrat to Congress to replace the deceased John E. Leonard for the final four months of the congressional term. Young chose to not run for reelection. He traveled back to Louisiana, and practiced law in Monroe, Louisiana, and then Shreveport, Louisiana. Young's first wife, Martha ("Mattie") Hamilton Young, died in 1891. From 1892 to 1900, Young was twice elected and served as Caddo Parish sheriff. Five years after being a widower, Young married a widow and Mattie's cousin, Frances ("Fannie") Rhoda Hodges. At age 66, Young finished his second term as sheriff and returned to practicing law in various capacities for several more years in Shreveport.

=== Death ===
He died at age 81 in Shreveport, Louisiana and is buried in Shreveport's Oakland Cemetery, Section 6, Lot 7.

=== Slaveholder ===
Young owned slaves.

== Notes ==
U.S. House of Representatives
Preceded by John E. Leonard	Member of the U.S. House of Representatives from Louisiana's 5th congressional district November 5, 1878 – March 3, 1879	Succeeded by J. Floyd King
