= Newt V. Mills =

American politician (1899–1996)

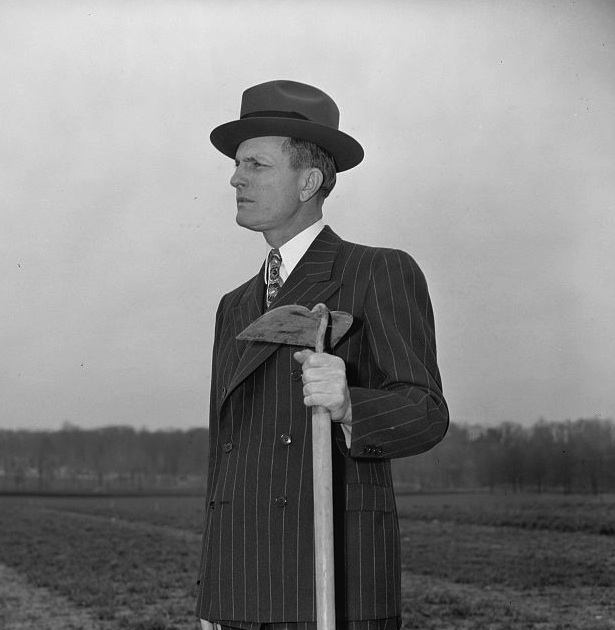

Member of the U.S. House of Representatives from Louisiana's 5th district
- In office January 3, 1937 – January 3, 1943
- Preceded by: Riley J. Wilson
- Succeeded by: Charles E. McKenzie

Personal details
- Born: Newt Virgus Mills; September 27, 1899 Calhoun, Louisiana, U.S.
- Died: May 15, 1996 (aged 96) Monroe, Louisiana, U.S.
- Party: Democratic
- Education: Louisiana Tech University Louisiana State University; Northwestern State University Spencer Business College in New Orleans
- Occupation: Educator; Businessman; Farmer

Newt Virgus Mills (September 27, 1899 – May 15, 1996) was an American educator, businessman, and politician who served three terms as a U.S. representative in the first half of the 20th century for Louisiana's 5th congressional district, based in Monroe, Louisiana.

== Biography ==
Born in Calhoun in western Ouachita Parish, Mills attended public schools and then enrolled at Louisiana Tech University in Ruston, Louisiana State University in Baton Rouge, Northwestern State University, then Louisiana Normal College, in Natchitoches, and Spencer Business College in New Orleans. He also studied law.

=== Early career ===
From 1921 to 1932, Mills taught school in Mer Rouge in Morehouse Parish. He was the Louisiana supervisor of public accounts from 1933 to 1936. He was also engaged in agricultural pursuits, cattle raising, real estate, and oil. In 1936, he served as colonel on the staff of the governor.

=== Congress ===
Mills was elected as a Democrat to the Seventy-fifty, Seventy-sixth, and Seventy-seventh Congresses from January 3, 1937, to January 3, 1943. He unseated Representative Riley J. Wilson of Catahoula Parish in the 1936 Democratic primary. In 1942, however, he was himself defeated for renomination by Charles E. McKenzie, a native of DeSoto Parish who had relocated to Monroe.

=== Later career and death ===
In 1950, Mills and Malcolm Lafargue, the former U.S. attorney for the United States District Court for the Western District of Louisiana, based in Shreveport, waged unsuccessful intraparty challenges to U.S. Senator Russell B. Long, son of the legendary Huey Pierce Long, Jr.

Mills resumed his involvement in oil and natural gas, cotton planting, and a building-supply company. He was a resident of Monroe until his death there at the age of ninety-six on May 15, 1996. He was the last living U.S. representative born in the nineteenth century.

U.S. House of Representatives
Preceded by Riley J. Wilson	Member of the U.S. House of Representatives from Louisiana's 5th congressional district 1937–1943	Succeeded by Charles E. McKenzie
Honorary titles
Preceded by Margaret Chase Smith	Oldest living United States representative (Sitting or former); May 29, 1995 – May 15, 1996	Succeeded by Harry P. Jeffrey
