= Riley J. Wilson =

American politician (1871–1946)

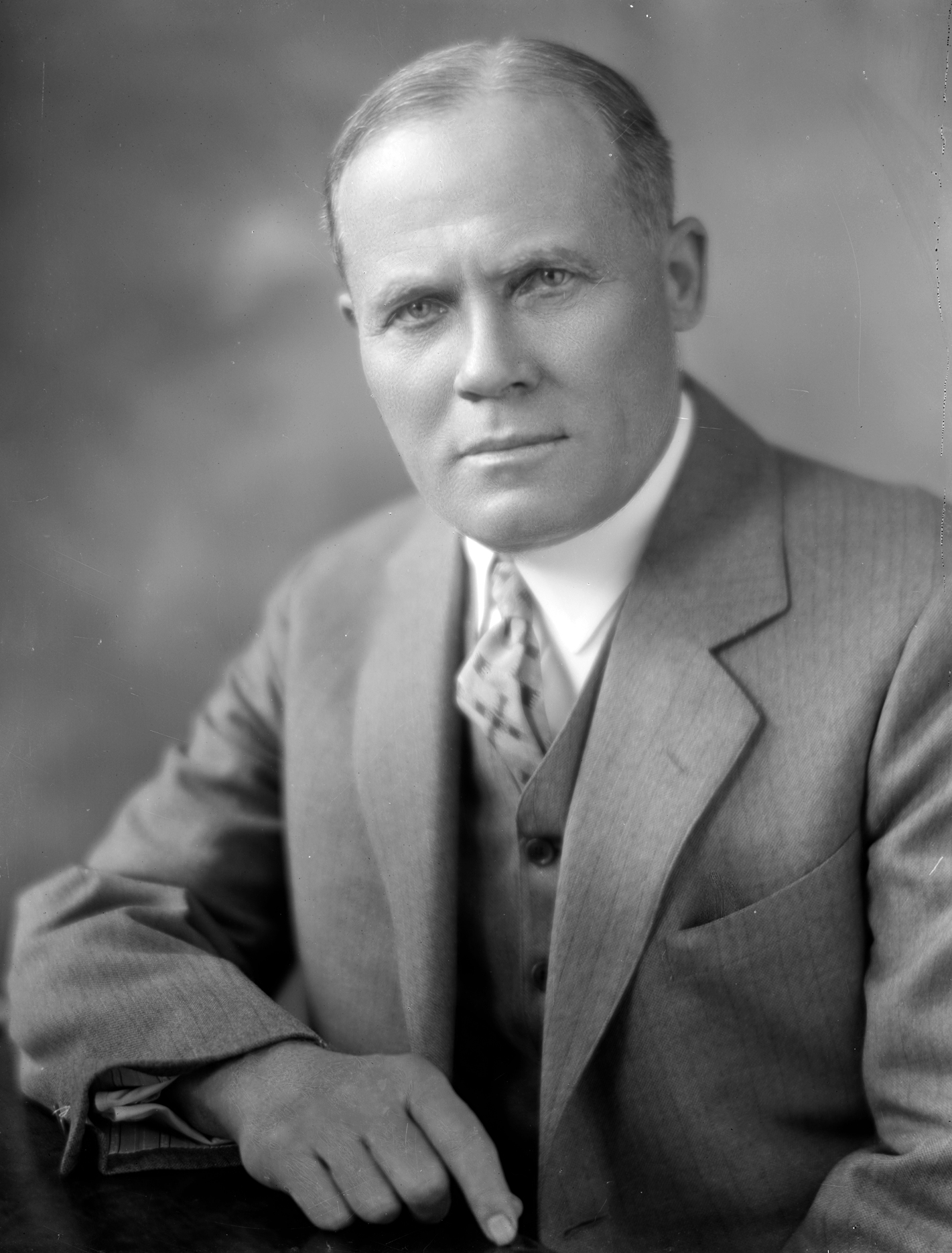

Member of the U.S. House of Representatives from Louisiana's 5th district
- In office March 4, 1915 – January 3, 1937
- Preceded by: James Walter Elder
- Succeeded by: Newt V. Mills

State Representative from Catahoula Parish
- In office 1900–1904
- Preceded by: Henry Breithaupt
- Succeeded by: E. B. Cottingham

Personal details
- Born: Riley Joseph Wilson; November 12, 1871 Goldonna, Louisiana, U.S.
- Died: February 23, 1946 (aged 74) Ruston, Louisiana, U.S.
- Resting place: Greenwood Cemetery in Ruston, Louisiana (2) Ruston, Louisiana
- Party: Democratic
- Education: Iuka Normal Institute in Tishomingo County, Mississippi
- Occupation: Educator;Attorney

Riley Joseph Wilson (November 12, 1871 – February 23, 1946) was a Louisiana educator, attorney and legislator in the late 19th century and the first decades of the 20th century. A Democrat, Wilson served in the United States House of Representatives from 1915 until 1937.

== Biography ==
Wilson was born near Goldonna in Winn Parish, Louisiana, on November 12, 1871. He graduated from Iuka Normal Institute in 1894.

=== Early career ===
Wilson became the principal of Harrisonburg High School in Harrisonburg, Louisiana, serving from 1895 to 1897. Mr. Wilson later studied law and was admitted to the bar in 1898 and began practicing in Harrisonburg.

=== Political career ===
Riley J. Wilson served as a district attorney, judge, member of the State House of Representatives, and a US Congressman. He represented Louisiana in the U.S. House of Representatives for a total of 11 terms, from 1915 to 1937. He was defeated for renomination in 1936 by Newt V. Mills.

=== Death and burial ===
He died on February 23, 1946 in Ruston, Louisiana, at the age of 74.

He is buried in Greenwood Cemetery.

- United States Congress. "Riley J. Wilson (id: W000608)". Biographical Directory of the United States Congress.. Retrieved on November 21, 2006

U.S. House of Representatives
Preceded by James Walter Elder	U.S. Representative from 5th District of Louisiana; 1915–1937	Succeeded by Newt V. Mills
Political offices
Preceded by Henry Breithaupt	State Representative from Catahoula Parish; 1900–1904	Succeeded by E. B. Cottingham
