= 71st Louisiana Legislature =

The 71st Louisiana Legislature was the Louisiana State Legislature for the years 2016-2020.

== House of Representatives members ==
District	Name	Party	Parishes represented	First elected
1	Danny McCormick	Rep	Bossier and Caddo	2019
2	Sam Jenkins	Dem	Bossier and Caddo	2015
3	Tammy Phelps	Dem	Caddo	2019
4	Cedric Glover	Dem	Caddo	2015
5	Alan Seabaugh	Rep	Caddo	2010
6	Thomas A. Pressly	Rep	Bossier and Caddo	2019
7	Larry Bagley	Rep	Caddo, DeSoto, and Sabine	2015
8	Raymond J. Crews	Rep	Bossier	2017
9	Dodie Horton	Rep	Bossier	2015
10	Wayne McMahen	Rep	Webster and Bossier	2018
11	Patrick O. Jefferson	Dem	Bienville, Claiborne, and Lincoln	2011
12	Christopher Turner	Rep	Lincoln and Union	2019
13	Jack McFarland	Rep	Bienville, Jackson, Ouachita, and Winn	2015
14	Michael Charles Echols	Rep	Morehouse and Ouachita	2019
15	Foy Bryan Gadberry	Rep	Ouachita	2019
16	Adrian Fisher	Dem	Morehouse and Ouachita parishes	2021
17	Pat Moore	Dem	Ouachita	2019
18	Jeremy LaCombe	Dem	Iberville, Pointe Coupee, West Baton Rouge, and West Feliciana	2019
19	Francis C. Thompson	Dem	East Carroll, Madison, Morehouse, Ouachita, Richland, and West Carroll	2019
20	Neil Riser	Rep	Caldwell, Catahoula, Franklin, LaSalle, and Tensas	2019
21	C. Travis Johnson	Dem	Catahoula, Concordia, East Carroll, Madison, and Tensas	2019
22	Gabe Firment	Rep	Grant, LaSalle, Natchitoches, Red River, and Winn	2019
23	Kenny R. Cox	Dem	DeSoto, Natchitoches, and Red River	2011
24	Rodney Schamerhorn	Rep	Natchitoches, Sabine, and Vernon	2019
25	Lance Harris	Rep	Rapides	2011
26	Ed Larvadain III	Dem	Rapides	2019
27	Michael T. Johnson	Rep	Rapides	2019
28	Daryl Deshotel	Rep	Avoyelles	2019
29	Edmond Jordan	Dem	East Baton Rouge and West Baton Rouge	2016
30	Charles Owen	Rep	Beauregard and Vernon	2019
31	Jonathan I. Goudeau	Rep	Lafayette and Vermilion	2019
32	R. Dewith Carrier	Rep	Allen, Beauregard, and Calcasieu	2019
33	Les Farnum	Rep	Calcasieu	2019
34	Wilford Carter Sr.	Dem	Calcasieu	2019
35	Brett F. Geymann	Rep	Beauregard and Calcasieu	2021
36	Phillip Eric Tarver	Rep	Calcasieu	2019
37	Troy D. Romero	Rep	Calcasieu and Jefferson Davis	2019
38	Rhonda Gaye Butler	Rep	Evangeline and St. Landry	2019
39	Julie Emerson	Rep	Lafayette and St. Landry	2015
40	Dustin Miller	Dem	St. Landry	2015
41	Phillip DeVillier	Rep	Acadia, Evangeline, and St. Landry	2015
42	John M. Stefanski	Rep	Acadia and Lafayette	2017
43	Stuart J. Bishop	Rep	Lafayette	2011
44	Vincent J. Pierre	Dem	Lafayette	2011
45	Jean-Paul Coussan	Rep	Lafayette	2015
46	Mike Huval	Rep	Iberia, St. Landry, and St. Martin	2011
47	Ryan Bourriaque	Rep	Calcasieu, Cameron, and Vermilion	2019
48	Beau Beaullieu	Rep	Iberia, Lafayette, and St. Martin	2019
49	Blake Miguez	Rep	Iberia and Vermillion	2015
50	Vincent "Vinney" St. Blanc III	Rep	St. Martin and St. Mary	2019
51	Beryl Amedee	Rep	Assumption, Lafourche, St. Mary, and Terrebonne	2015
52	Jerome Zeringue	Rep	Lafourche and Terrebonne	2015
53	Tanner Magee	Rep	Lafourche and Terrebonne	2015
54	Joseph A. Orgeron	Rep	Jefferson and Lafourche	2020
55	Bryan Fontenot	Rep	Lafourche	2019
56	Gregory A. Miller	Rep	St. Charles and St. John the Baptist	2011
57	Randal L. Gaines	Dem	St. Charles and St. John the Baptist	2011
58	Ken Brass	Dem	Ascension, Iberville, and St. James	2017
59	Tony Bacala	Rep	Ascension	2015
60	Chad Brown	Dem	Assumption and Iberville	2015
61	C. Denise Marcelle	Dem	East Baton Rouge	2015
62	Roy Daryl Adams	Ind	East Baton Rouge, East Feliciana, and West Feliciana	2019
63	Barbara Carpenter	Dem	East Baton Rouge	2015
64	Valarie Hodges	Rep	East Baton Rouge and Livingston	2011
65	Barry Ivey	Rep	East Baton Rouge	2013
66	Rick Edmonds	Rep	East Baton Rouge	2015
67	Larry Selders	Dem	East Baton Rouge	2019
68	Scott McKnight	Rep	East Baton Rouge	2019
69	Paula Davis	Rep	East Baton Rouge	2015
70	Barbara Reich Freiberg	Rep	East Baton Rouge	2019
71	Buddy Mincey Jr.	Rep	Livingston	2019
72	Robby Carter	Dem	East Feliciana, St. Helena, and Tangipahoa	2015
73	William Wheat Jr.	Rep	Tangipahoa	2019
74	Lawrence "Larry" Frieman	Rep	St. Tammany, Tangipahoa, and Washington	2019
75	Malinda White	Rep	St. Tammany and Washington	2015
76	Robert "Bob" Owen	Rep	St. Tammany	2019
77	Mark Wright	Rep	St. Tammany	2017
78	John R. Illg Jr.	Rep	Jefferson	2019
79	Debbie Villio	Rep	Jefferson	2019
80	Polly Thomas	Rep	Jefferson	2016
81	Clay Schexnayder	Rep	Ascension, Livingston, St. John the Baptist, and St. James	2011
82	Laurie Schlegel	Rep	Jefferson	2021
83	Kyle M. Green Jr.	Dem	Jefferson	2019
84	Timothy P. Kerner Sr	Rep	Jefferson	2019
85	Joseph A. Marino III	Ind	Jefferson	2016
86	Nicholas Muscarello	Rep	Tangipahoa	2018
87	Rodney Lyons	Dem	Jefferson	2015
88	Kathy Edmonston	Rep	Ascension	2019
89	Richard Nelson	Rep	St. Tammany	2019
90	Mary DuBuisson	Rep	St. Tammany	2018
91	Mandie Landry	Dem	Orleans	2019
92	Joseph A. Stagni	Rep	Jefferson and St. Charles	2017
93	Royce Duplessis	Dem	Orleans	2018
94	Stephanie Hilferty	Rep	Jefferson and Orleans	2015
95	Sherman Q. Mack	Rep	Livingston	2011
96	Marcus Anthony Bryant	Dem	Iberia, Lafayette, and St. Martin	2019
97	Matthew Willard	Dem	Orleans	2019
98	Aimee Adatto Freeman	Dem	Orleans	2019
99	Candace N. Newell	Dem	Orleans	2019
100	Jason Hughes	Dem	Orleans	2019
101	Vanessa Caston LaFleur	Dem	East Baton Rouge	2022
102	Delisha Boyd	Dem	Orleans	2021
103	Raymond E. Garafolo	Rep	Orleans, St. Bernard, and Plaquemines	2011
104	Paul Hollis	Rep	St. Tammany	2011
105	Mack Cormier	Dem	Jefferson, Orleans, and Plaquemines	2019

== Senate members ==
District	Name	Party	District Office	First elected
1	Sharon Hewitt	Rep	Slidell	2015
2	Edward J. Price	Dem	Gonzales	2017
3	Joseph Bouie	Dem	New Orleans	2019
4	Jimmy Harris	Dem	New Orleans	2019
5	Vacant			
6	Mack "Bodi" White	Rep	Baton Rouge	2011
7	Gary Carter	Dem	New Orleans	2021
8	Patrick Connick	Rep	Marrero	2019
9	Cameron Henry	Rep	Metairie	2019
10	Kirk Talbot	Rep	River Ridge	2019
11	Patrick McMath	Rep	Covington	2019
12	Beth Mizell	Rep	Franklinton	2015
13	J. Rogers Pope	Rep	Denham Springs	2019
14	Cleo Fields	Dem	Baton Rouge	2019
15	Regina Barrow	Dem	Baton Rouge	2015
16	Franklin J. Foil	Rep	Baton Rouge	2019
17	Rick Ward	Rep	Port Allen	2011
18	Eddie J. Lambert	Rep	Prairieville	2015
19	Gary L. Smith Jr.	Dem	Norco	2011
20	Michael "Big Mike" Fesi	Rep	Houma	2019
21	R. L. Bret Allain	Rep	Franklin	2011
22	Fred H. Mills Jr.	Rep	New Iberia	2011
23	Patrick Page Cortez	Rep	Lafayette	2011
24	Gerald Boudreaux	Dem	Lafayette	2015
25	Mark Abraham	Rep	Lake Charles	2019
26	Bob Hensgens	Rep	Abbeville	2018
27	Jeremy Stine	Rep	Lake Charles	2021
28	Heather Cloud	Rep	Turkey Creek	2019
29	Jay Luneau	Dem	Alexandria	2015
30	Mike Reese	Rep	Leesville	2019
31	Louie Bernard	Rep	Natchitoches	2019
32	Glen Womack	Rep	Harrisonburg	2019
33	Stewart Cathey Jr.	Rep	Monroe	2019
34	Katrina R. Jackson	Dem	Monroe	2019
35	John C. "Jay" Morris	Rep	West Monroe	2019
36	Robert Mills	Rep	Minden	2019
37	Barrow Peacock	Rep	Bossier City	2011
38	Barry Milligan	Rep	Shreveport	2019
39	Gregory Tarver	Dem	Shreveport	2011
