= Louisiana's 3rd House of Representatives district =

American legislative district

Louisiana's 3rd State House of Representatives district
Representative
Tammy Phelps; D–Shreveport

Louisiana's 3rd House of Representatives district is one of 105 Louisiana House of Representatives districts. It is currently represented by Democrat Tammy Phelps of Shreveport.

== Geography ==
HD3 includes the neighbourhoods of Ridgewood, Deep Woods, and Southern Hills and a small part of the city of Shreveport.

== Election results ==
Year	Winning candidate	Party	Percent	Opponent	Party	Percent
2011	Barbara Norton	Democratic	56.1%	Lynn Cawthorne	Democratic	43.9%
2015	Barbara Norton	Democratic	100%			
2019	Tammy Phelps	Democratic	50.6%	Daryl Joy Walters	Democratic	49.4%
2023	Tammy Phelps	Democratic	Cancelled			
