= Louisiana's 25th House of Representatives district =

American legislative district

Louisiana's 25th State House of Representatives district
Representative
Jason Brian DeWitt; R–Tioga

Louisiana's 25th House of Representatives district is one of 105 Louisiana House of Representatives districts. It is currently represented by Republican Jason Brian DeWitt of Tioga.

== Geography ==
HD25 includes the parts of the cities of Alexandria and Natchitoches.

== Election results ==
Year	Winning candidate	Party	Percent	Opponent	Party	Percent
2011	Lance Harris	Republican	55.4%	Barett Byrd	Republican	44.6%
2015	Lance Harris	Republican	100%	Vivian Ebare Brossett	Democratic	Withdrew
2019	Lance Harris	Republican	100%			
2023	Jason Brian DeWitt	Republican	59%	Trish Leleux	Republican	41%
