= Robert Johnson (Louisiana politician) =

American politician (born 1975)

Minority Leader of the Louisiana House of Representatives
- In office March 19, 2018 – January 13, 2020
- Preceded by: Gene Reynolds
- Succeeded by: Sam Jenkins

Member of the Louisiana House of Representatives from the 28th district
- In office January 2008 – January 13, 2020
- Preceded by: Charles Riddle
- Succeeded by: Daryl Deshotel

Personal details
- Born: Robert Allen Johnson; January 1975 (age 51)
- Party: Democratic
- Education: Loyola University, New Orleans (BA, JD)

Robert Allen Johnson (born January 1975) is a former Democratic member of the Louisiana House of Representatives from District 28 in Avoyelles Parish in south central Louisiana. He resides in Marksville. While in the House, Johnson was the House Minority Leader, opposite Majority Leader Lance Harris of Alexandria.

== Education ==
Johnson attended Loyola University New Orleans, from which he earned a Bachelor of Arts in politics in 1997 and a Juris Doctor in 2000 from the Loyola University New Orleans College of Law.

== Political career ==
Johnson has previously worked as a prosecutor.

In the nonpartisan blanket primary held on October 20, 2007, to fill the seat vacated by Democrat Charles Riddle, III, Johnson led by forty-seven votes his Republican opponent, Kirby "Coach" Roy, III (born 1954), a native of Alexandria who relocated to Hessmer in Avoyelles Parish. The presence of two other Democratic candidates compelled a second round of balloting, called the Louisiana general election. In that balloting, Johnson defeated Roy, 7,436 (52.8 percent) to 6,642 (47.2 percent). Roy challenged Johnson for a second time in the primary election held on October 22, 2011, but he fell far short of victory. Johnson received 8,037 votes (62.8 percent) to Roy's 4,768 (37.2 percent).

Johnson serves on the Agriculture, Forestry, Aquaculture, and Rural Development Committee, the Insurance Committee, the Ways and Means Committee, the Joint Legislative Committee on Capital Outlay, and the Atchafalaya Basin Program Oversight Committee. He is a member of the Louisiana Rural Caucus.

Johnson was an unsuccessful candidate in Louisiana's 5th congressional district special election held on October 19, 2013. Among fourteen candidates, he finished fifth with 9,971 votes (10 percent). He won a majority in his own Avoyelles Parish and finished with a plurality as well in East Feliciana, one of the Florida Parishes. Johnson finished just behind Clyde C. Holloway, the fourth-place candidate and a Republican member of the Louisiana Public Service Commission from Johnson's neighboring Rapides Parish. Holloway polled 11,250 votes (11 percent). The two top vote getters, both Republicans from northeastern Louisiana, State Senator Neil Riser of Columbia in Caldwell Parish and political newcomer, Vance McAllister, a businessman from the Monroe area, meet in the November 16 runoff election to choose a new representative to succeed Republican Rodney Alexander, who resigned in September to join the administration of Governor Bobby Jindal. While Riser has the support of three sitting U.S. representatives from Louisiana, McAllister shot to a runoff berth with the celebrity endorsement of Phil Robertson of the A&E Network's Duck Dynasty television series.

Johnson was considered a potential Democratic candidate in 2016 for the United States Senate seat vacated by Republican David Vitter but never filed for the position.

Johnson ran for the State Senate's 28th district in 2019, but was defeated by Republican Heather Cloud.

Louisiana House of Representatives
Preceded by Jean Doerge	Member of the Louisiana House of Representatives from the 10th district 2012–2020	Succeeded by Daryl Deshotel
Preceded by Gene Reynolds	Minority Leader of the Louisiana House of Representatives; 2018–2020	Succeeded by Sam Jenkins
