= Louisiana's 28th House of Representatives district =

American legislative district

Louisiana's 28th State House of Representatives district
Representative
Daryl Deshotel; R–Marksville

Louisiana's 28th House of Representatives district is one of 105 Louisiana House of Representatives districts. It is currently represented by Republican Daryl Deshotel of Marksville.

== Geography ==
HD28 includes the cities of Bunkie, Cottonport, Marksville and Mansura.

== Election results ==
Year	Winning candidate	Party	Percent	Opponent	Party	Percent	Opponent	Party	Percent	Opponent	Party	Percent
2011	Robert Johnson	Democratic	62.8%	Kirby Roy III	Republican	37.2%						
2015	Robert Johnson	Democratic	74.8%	Brian Bordelon	Democratic	25.2%						
2019	Daryl Deshotel	Republican	61.3%	Marcus Johnson	Democratic	17.5%	Donald Milligan	Democratic	16.2%	Ramondo Ramos	Independent	5%
2023	Daryl Deshotel	Republican	81.5%	Ramondo Ramos	Democratic	18.5%						
