= Louisiana's 78th House of Representatives district =

American legislative district

Louisiana's 78th State House of Representatives district
Representative
| John R. Illg Jr. R–Harahan |

Louisiana's 78th House of Representatives district is one of 105 Louisiana House of Representatives districts. It is currently represented by Republican John R. Illg Jr. of Harahan.

== Geography ==
HD78 makes up part of the New Orleans consolidated city-parish, alongside its adjacent districts of 80, 82, 83 and 92. It includes within it part of the suburb-city of Harahan.

== Election results ==
| Year | Winning candidate | Party | Percent | Opponent | Party | Percent |
|---|---|---|---|---|---|---|
| 2011 | Kirk Talbot | Republican | 100% | | | |
| 2015 | Kirk Talbot | Republican | 100% | | | |
| 2019 | John Illg Jr. | Republican | 58.5% | William Wallis | Republican | 41.5% |
| 2023 | John Illg Jr. | Republican | Cancelled | | | |

== Sources ==
- Richardson, Richard J. (1961). Orleans Parish Offices: Notes on a City-Parish Consolidation. Edgar B. Stern Memorial Honors Fellowship Series. Vol. 1. New Orleans: Bureau of Governmental Research – via HathiTrust.
