= 2021 Louisiana's 5th congressional district special election =

Louisiana's 5th congressional district special election
- March 20, 2021

Louisiana's 5th congressional district
- Turnout: 21.4%
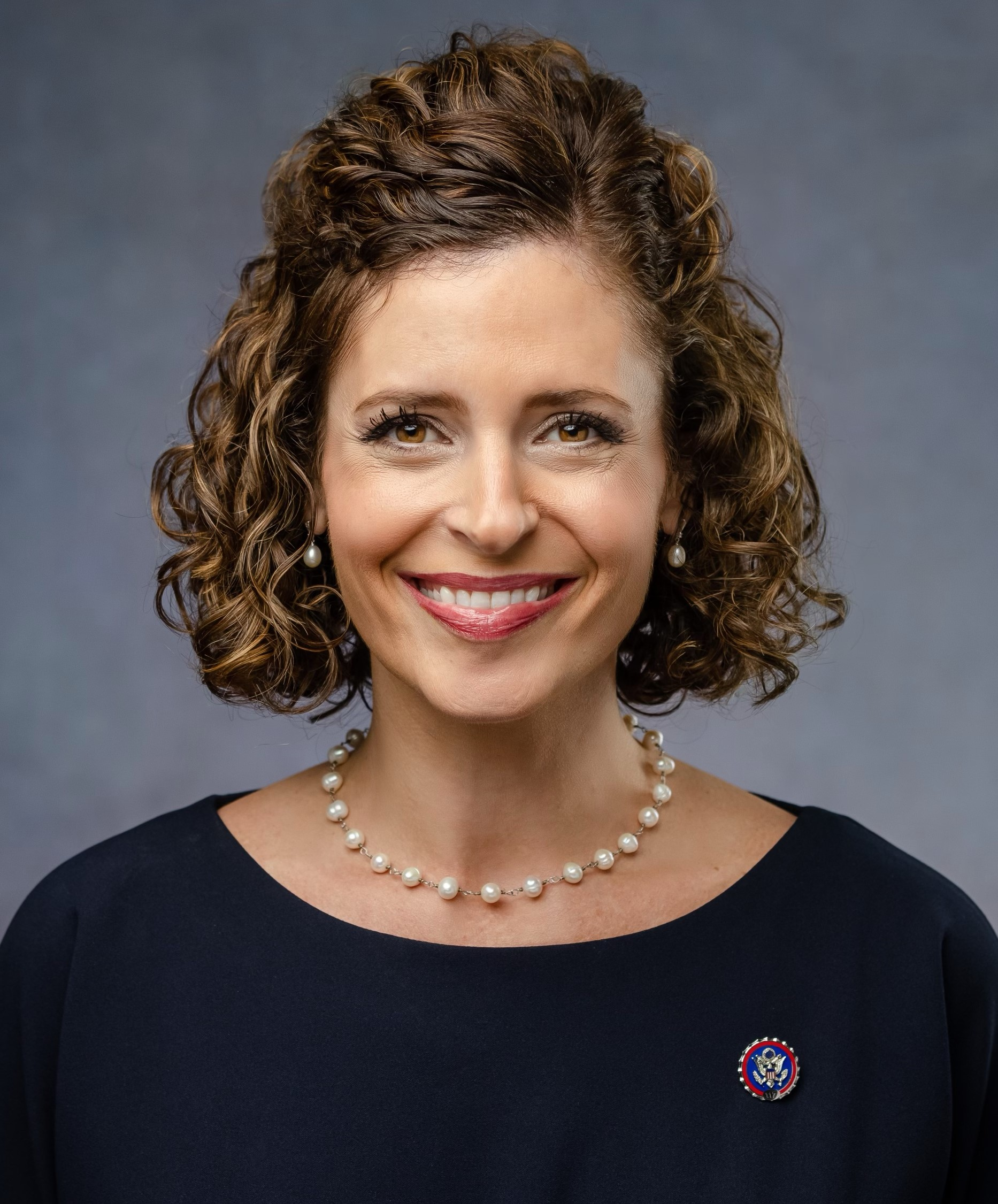

Candidate	Julia Letlow	Sandra Christophe	Chad Conerly
Party	Republican	Democratic	Republican
Popular vote	67,203	28,255	5,497
Percentage	64.86%	27.27%	5.31%
- Parish results Letlow: 40–50% 50–60% 60–70% 70–80% 80–90% Christophe: 40–50%
U.S. Representative before election
Vacant
Elected U.S. Representative
Julia Letlow
Republican

The 2021 Louisiana's 5th congressional district special election was held on March 20, 2021. It was triggered by the death of Republican congressman-elect Luke Letlow on December 29, 2020, who died from a heart attack while being treated for COVID-19.

When congressional seats in Louisiana become vacant, the Governor may call a special election at any time. The special election to fill Louisiana's 5th congressional district took place on March 20, 2021, as stated by Governor John Bel Edwards's office. Luke Letlow's widow, Julia Letlow, won the election with more than 64 percent of the vote.

It was one of two special elections to the House of Representatives held in Louisiana, along with the election to the 2nd district, which was held on the same day.

== Background ==
=== Congressional district ===
Louisiana's 5th congressional district includes all or part of Avoyelles, Caldwell, Catahoula, Concordia, East Carroll, East Feliciana, Franklin, Jackson, La Salle Lincoln, Madison, Morehouse, Rapides, Richland, St. Helena, St. Landry, Tangipahoa, Tensas, Washington, West Carroll, West Feliciana, and Winn parishes. Traditionally conservative, the district has been considered a safe seat for Republicans since Rodney Alexander changed his party affiliation in 2004. Although the Democratic Party had an enrollment advantage of 26,719 at the time of the 2020 presidential election, Donald Trump won over 64 percent of the district's vote.

=== 2020 election and Letlow's death ===
In February 2020, Ralph Abraham, who had been serving as the district's U.S. Representative since 2015, announced that he would not run for re-election. Abraham's former chief of staff, Luke Letlow, announced his candidacy in the congressional election shortly thereafter, with Abraham publicly endorsing him. Letlow was an outspoken supporter of President Donald Trump, and he publicly praised his leadership during the COVID-19 pandemic.

In the jungle primary on November 3, Letlow won the most votes, but he was unable to secure a majority, triggering a runoff election against runner-up Lance Harris. Letlow defeated Harris in the runoff election on December 5, with 62 percent of the vote. Shortly after his victory in the runoff, Letlow tested positive for COVID-19, and he was hospitalized the following day. Letlow's condition worsened, and he was moved to the intensive care unit where he died days later on December 29, less than a week before he was scheduled to be sworn into office.

== Candidates ==
=== Democratic Party ===
==== Declared ====
- Sandra "Candy" Christophe, social worker and candidate for this seat in 2020

==== Withdrawn ====
- Jessica Honsinger Hollister, actress

=== Republican Party ===
==== Declared ====
- Chad Conerly, finance professional
- Allen Guillory, candidate for this seat in 2020
- Robert Lansden, attorney
- Julia Letlow, administrative executive assistant at University of Louisiana at Monroe and widow of U.S. representative-elect Luke Letlow
- Jaycee Magnuson
- Horace Melton III
- Richard H. Pannell
- Sancha Smith, political organizer
- Errol Victor Sr., pastor

==== Declined ====
- Ralph Abraham, former U.S. Representative and candidate for Governor of Louisiana in 2019
- Stewart Cathey, state senator (endorsed Julia Letlow)
- Michael Echols, state representative
- Lance Harris, state representative and candidate for this seat in 2020
- Mike Johnson, state representative
- Scotty Robinson, Ouachita Parish Police Juror and candidate for this seat in 2020

=== No party affiliation ===
==== Declared ====
- Jim Davis
- M. V. "Vinny" Mendoza, perennial candidate

=== Endorsements ===
Julia Letlow (R)

Former U.S. Executive Branch Officials

- Nikki Haley, 29th United States Ambassador to the United Nations (2017–2018) and 116th governor of South Carolina (2011–2017)
- Mike Pence, 48th vice president of the United States (2017–2021)
- Donald Trump, 45th president of the United States (2017–2021)

U.S. Senators

- John Kennedy, U.S. Senator from Louisiana (2017–present)

U.S. Representatives

- Kevin McCarthy, U.S. Representative from CA-23 (2013–present), House Majority Leader (2014-2019), House Minority Leader (2019–present)
- Steve Scalise, U.S. Representative from LA-01 (2008–present), House Majority Whip (2014-2019), House Minority Whip (2019-present)

Organizations

- National Federation of Independent Business
- Republican Party of Louisiana
Candy Christophe (D)

Organizations

- Democratic Party of Louisiana

== Jungle primary ==
=== Predictions ===
Source	Ranking	As of
The Cook Political Report	Solid R	March 19, 2021
Inside Elections	Solid R	March 19, 2021
Sabato's Crystal Ball	Safe R	March 18, 2021

=== Results ===
2021 Louisiana's 5th congressional district special election
Party	Candidate	Votes	%
Republican	Julia Letlow	67,203	64.86
Democratic	Sandra Christophe	28,255	27.27
Republican	Chad Conerly	5,497	5.31
Republican	Robert Lansden	929	0.90
Republican	Allen Guillory	464	0.45
Independent	Jim Davis	402	0.39
Republican	Sancha Smith	334	0.32
Republican	M. V. Mendoza	236	0.23
Independent	Jaycee Magnuson	131	0.13
Republican	Richard H. Pannell	67	0.06
Republican	Horace Melton III	62	0.06
Republican	Errol Victor Sr.	36	0.03
Total votes		103,616	100.00
Republican hold			

==== By parish ====
Parish	Julia Letlow Republican		Sandra Christophe Democratic		Chad Conerly Republican		Various candidates Other parties		Margin		Total votes
Parish	#	%	#	%	#	%	#	%	#	%	Total votes
Avoyelles	3,053	63.7	1,189	24.8	430	9.0	123	2.5	1,864	38.9	4,795
Caldwell	1,426	83.0	204	11.9	57	3.3	31	1.8	1,222	71.1	1,718
Catahoula	1,197	67.0	489	27.4	72	4.0	28	1.6	708	39.6	1,786
Concordia	1,797	68.5	715	27.3	78	3.0	33	1.3	1,082	41.3	2,623
East Carroll	483	48.9	469	47.5	21	2.1	15	1.5	14	1.4	988
East Feliciana	682	45.0	696	45.9	98	6.5	41	2.6	–14	0.9	1,517
Franklin	2,681	79.7	509	15.1	130	3.9	40	1.3	2,172	64.6	3,363
Grant	2,346	78.8	328	11.0	199	6.7	106	3.5	2,018	67.8	2,979
Jackson	1,900	70.2	678	25.1	79	2.9	48	1.8	1,222	45.1	2,705
La Salle	2,189	86.9	157	6.2	119	4.7	55	2.2	2,032	80.7	2,520
Lincoln	4,515	67.0	1,968	29.2	131	1.9	128	1.9	2,547	37.8	6,742
Madison	722	47.9	666	44.2	57	3.8	62	4.1	56	3.7	1,507
Morehouse	2,442	55.5	1,711	38.9	92	2.1	158	3.5	731	16.6	4,403
Ouachita	14,821	67.2	6,174	28.0	607	2.8	442	2.0	8,647	39.2	22,044
Rapides	10,373	62.3	5,086	30.5	739	4.4	463	2.8	5,287	31.8	16,661
Richland	3,310	77.6	826	19.4	84	2.0	48	1.0	2,484	58.2	4,268
St. Helena	220	43.9	140	27.9	134	26.7	7	1.5	60	16.0	501
St. Landry	3,316	54.1	2,169	35.4	267	4.4	381	6.1	1,147	18.7	6,133
Tangipahoa	2,147	48.4	1,019	23.0	1,102	24.9	166	3.7	1,045	23.5	4,434
Tensas	532	53.4	417	41.9	25	2.5	22	2.5	115	11.5	996
Washington	3,092	58.1	1,576	29.6	532	10.0	126	2.3	1,516	28.5	5,326
West Carroll	1,197	75.5	155	9.8	205	12.9	28	1.8	992	62.6	1,585
West Feliciana	998	58.3	533	31.1	132	7.7	49	2.9	465	27.2	1,712
Winn	1,764	76.4	381	16.5	107	4.6	58	2.5	1,383	59.9	2,310
Total	67,203	64.86%	28,255	27.27%	5,497	5.31%	2,658	2.56%	38,948	37.59%	103,616

== See also ==
- List of special elections to the United States House of Representatives
