= Louisiana's 79th House of Representatives district =

American legislative district

Louisiana's 79th State House of Representatives district
Representative
Debbie Villio; R–Kenner

Louisiana's 79th House of Representatives district is one of 105 Louisiana House of Representatives districts. It is currently represented by Republican Debbie Villio of Kenner.

== Geography ==
HD79 makes up the northern border of Jefferson Parish. It spans the northern edge of the city of Kenner, and a small part of the community of Metairie.

== Election results ==
Year	Winning candidate	Party	Percent	Opponent	Party	Percent	Opponent	Opponent	Party	Opponent	Party	Percent
2011	Anthony Ligi	Republican	100%									
2013 - Special	Julie Stokes	Republican	56%	Jack Rizzuto	Republican	33.2%	Allison Bowler	Republican	9.3%	Paul Hankins Villalobos	Republican	1.5%
2015	Julie Stokes	Republican	100%									
2019	Debbie Villio	Republican	100%									
2023	Debbie Villio	Republican	Cancelled									
