= Louisiana's 48th House of Representatives district =

American legislative district

Louisiana's 48th State House of Representatives district
Representative
Gerald 'Beau' Beaullieu IV; R–New Iberia

Louisiana's 48th House of Representatives district is one of 105 Louisiana House of Representatives districts. It is currently represented by Republican Gerald 'Beau' Beaullieu IV of New Iberia.

== Geography ==
HD48 is made up of a small part of the metropolitan area of Lafayette, alongside it is the adjacent districts of 43 and 96. Additionally, the district includes parts of the cities of New Iberia, Saint Martinville and Youngsville.

== Election results ==
Year	Winning candidate	Party	Percent	Opponent	Party	Percent
2011	Taylor Barras	Republican	100%			
2015	Taylor Barras	Republican	100%			
2019	Gerald Beaullieu IV	Republican	57%	Ricky Gonsoulin	Republican	43%
2023	Gerald Beaullieu IV	Republican	85.1%	David Levy	Democratic	14.9%
