= Louisiana's 73rd House of Representatives district =

American legislative district

Louisiana's 73rd State House of Representatives district
Representative
Kimberly Coates; R–Ponchatoula

Louisiana's 73rd House of Representatives district is one of 105 Louisiana House of Representatives districts. It is currently represented by Republican Kimberly Coates of Ponchatoula.

== Geography ==
HD73 is made up of a large part of Tangipahoa Parish. It includes the city of Ponchatoula and a small part of the city of Hammond.

== Election results ==
Year	Winning candidate	Party	Percent	Opponent	Party	Percent	Opponent	Party	Percent
2011	Stephen Pugh	Republican	81.1%	David Englade	Republican	18.9%			
2015	Stephen Pugh	Republican	51.6%	Tim Bailey	Republican	48.4%			
2019	William Wheat Jr.	Republican	74.4%	Michael Chatellier	Republican	22.6%			
2023	Kimberly Coates	Republican	53.9%	Braville LeBlanc	Republican	36.6%	Michael Chatellier	Republican	9.5%
