= Louisiana's 83rd House of Representatives district =

American legislative district

Louisiana's 83rd State House of Representatives district
Representative
Kyle Green Jr. D–Marrero

Louisiana's 83rd House of Representatives district is one of 105 Louisiana House of Representatives districts. It is currently represented by Democrat Kyle Green Jr.

== Geography ==
HD83 is located entirely within Jefferson Parish, and contains the Census-designated places of Waggaman, Marrero, Bridge City a portion of Estelle, Avondale, and the city of Westwego.

== Election results ==
Year	Winning candidate	Party	Percent	Opponent	Party	Percent
2011	Robert Billiot	Democratic	57.3%	Kyle Green Jr.	Democratic	42.7%
2015	Robert Billiot	Democratic	51.8%	Kyle Green Jr.	Democratic	48.2%
2019	Kyle Green Jr.	Democratic	62.3%	James Simmons Jr.	Democratic	37.7%
2023	Kyle Green Jr.	Democratic	70.6%	Reginald Jasmine	Republican	29.4%
