= Louisiana's 30th House of Representatives district =

American legislative district

Louisiana's 30th State House of Representatives district
Representative
Charles Owen; R–Rosepine

Louisiana's 30th House of Representatives district is one of 105 Louisiana House of Representatives districts. It is currently represented by Republican Charles Owen of Rosepine.

== Geography ==
HD30 includes the cities of Anacoco, DeRidder, Leesville and Rosepine.

== Election results ==
Year	Winning candidate	Party	Percent	Opponent	Party	Percent	Opponent	Party	Percent
2011	James Armes	Democratic	54.5%	Gregory Lord	Republican	28.1%	Jack Causey	Republican	17.4%
2015	James Armes	Democratic	100%						
2019	Charles Owen	Republican	53.4%	A.C. Dowden Jr.	Republican	46.4%			
2023	Charles Owen	Republican	85.2%	William Jones	Independent	14.8%			
