= Louisiana's 63rd House of Representatives district =

American legislative district

Louisiana's 63rd State House of Representatives district
Representative
Barbara West Carpenter; D–Baton Rouge

Louisiana's 63rd House of Representatives district is one of 105 Louisiana House of Representatives districts. It is currently represented by Democrat Barbara West Carpenter of Baton Rouge.

== Geography ==
HD63 is made up of a small part of the Baton Rouge metropolitan area, and includes parts of the cities of Baker, and Zachary.

== Election results ==
Year	Winning candidate	Party	Percent	Opponent	Party	Percent	Opponent	Party	Percent	Opponent	Party	Percent
2011	Dalton Honore	Democratic	61.5%	Barbara Thomas	Republican	19.8%	Ronald L. Rogers Jr.	Democratic	14.4%	Hillery Godfred Johnson	Independent	4.2%
2015	Barbara Carpenter	Democratic	58.2%	Ulysses Addison	Democratic	41.8%						
2019	Barbara Carpenter	Democratic	62.2%	Dalton Honore	Democratic	37.8%						
2023	Barbara Carpenter	Democratic	64.2%	Chauna Banks	Democratic	35.8%						
