= Louisiana's 7th House of Representatives district =

American legislative district

Louisiana's 7th State House of Representatives district
Representative
Larry Bagley; R–Stonewall

Louisiana's 7th House of Representatives district is one of 105 Louisiana House of Representatives districts. It is currently represented by Republican Larry Bagley of Stonewall.

== Geography ==
HD7 includes the cities of Mansfield, Converse, Longstreet and Stonewall.

== Election results ==
Year	Winning candidate	Party	Percent	Opponent	Party	Percent	Opponent	Party	Percent
2011	Richard Burford	Republican	68.9%	Cynthia Williams	Democratic	31.1%			
2015	Larry Bagley	Republican	52.8%	Steve Casey	Republican	26.5%	Perry McDaniel	Republican	20.7%
2019	Larry Bagley	Republican	100%						
2023	Larry Bagley	Republican	61.2%	Tim Pruitt	Republican	38.8%			
