= Louisiana's 70th House of Representatives district =

American legislative district

Louisiana's 70th State House of Representatives district
Representative
Barbara Reich Freiberg; R–Baton Rouge

Louisiana's 70th House of Representatives district is one of 105 Louisiana House of Representatives districts. It is currently represented by Republican Barbara Reich Freiberg of Baton Rouge.

== Geography ==
HD70 includes a portion of the city of Baton Rouge, and St. George.

== Election results ==
Year	Winning candidate	Party	Percent	Opponent	Party	Percent
2011	Franklin Foil	Republican	77.4%	Greg Baldwin	Independent	22.6%
2015	Franklin Foil	Republican	74.4%	Shamaka Schumake	Democratic	25.6%
2019	Barbara Freiberg	Republican	52.6%	Belinda Davis	Democratic	46.4%
2023	Barbara Freiberg	Republican	64.9%	Steve Myers	Democratic	35.1%
