= Louisiana's 86th House of Representatives district =

American legislative district

Louisiana's 86th State House of Representatives district
Representative
Nicholas Muscarello; R–Hammond

Louisiana's 86th House of Representatives district is one of 105 Louisiana House of Representatives districts. It is currently represented by Republican Nicholas Muscarello.

== Geography ==
HD86 is located in Tangipahoa Parish and includes areas in and around Hammond, Independence, Tickfaw, Natalbany, and Amite City.

== Election results ==
Year	Winning candidate	Party	Percent	Opponent	Party	Percent
2018 (special)	Nicholas Muscarello	Republican	52.6%	David Vial	Republican	47.4%
2019	Nicholas Muscarello	Republican	100%			
2023*	Nicholas Muscarello	Republican	100%			

"*" indicates candidate was lone individual on ballot resulting in the election being canceled.
