= Louisiana's 72nd House of Representatives district =

American legislative district

Louisiana's 72nd State House of Representatives district
Representative
Robby Carter; D–Amite

Louisiana's 72nd House of Representatives district is one of 105 Louisiana House of Representatives districts. It is currently represented by Democrat Robby Carter of Amite. It was formerly represented by Minority leader of the Louisiana House and later Governor John Bel Edwards.

== Geography ==
HD72 includes the entirety of St. Helena Parish and a small part of Tangipahoa Parish, including parts of the towns of Amite and Kentwood.

== Election results ==
Year	Winning candidate	Party	Percent	Opponent	Party	Percent
2011	John Edwards	Democratic	83.1%	Johnny Duncan	Independent	16.9%
2015	Robby Carter	Democratic	63.2%	Hunter Carter	Democratic	36.8%
2019	Robby Carter	Democratic	80.9%	Marylee Bellau	Independent	19.1%
2023	Robby Carter	Democratic	67.5%	Roderick Matthews	Democratic	32.5%
