= Louisiana's 36th House of Representatives district =

American legislative district

Louisiana's 36th State House of Representatives district
Representative
Phillip Tarver; R–Lake Charles

Louisiana's 36th House of Representatives district is one of 105 Louisiana House of Representatives districts. It is currently represented by Republican Phillip Tarver of Lake Charles. It was formerly represented by then Speaker of the House, Charles Kleckley.

== Geography ==
HD36 includes a small part of the city of Lake Charles, including McNeese State University and Lake Charles Regional Airport.

== Election results ==
Year	Winning candidate	Party	Percent	Opponent	Party	Percent
2011	Charles Kleckley	Republican	100%			
2015	Mark Abraham	Republican	54.6%	Keith DeSonier	Republican	45.4%
2019	Phillip Tarver	Republican	61.9%	Michael Eason	Republican	38.1%
2023	Phillip Tarver	Republican	Cancelled			
