= Louisiana's 43rd House of Representatives district =

American legislative district

Louisiana's 43rd State House of Representatives district
Representative
Josh Carlson; R–Lafayette

Louisiana's 43rd House of Representatives district is one of 105 Louisiana House of Representatives districts. It is currently represented by Republican Josh Carlson of Lafayette.

== Geography ==
HD43 includes a portion of the metropolitan area of Lafayette including a small part of the city itself, as well as the city of Broussard and Lafayette Regional Airport.

== Election results ==
Year	Winning candidate	Party	Percent	Opponent	Party	Percent
2011	Stuart Bishop	Republican Party	100%			
2015	Stuart Bishop	Republican Party	100%			
2019	Stuart Bishop	Republican	80.8%	Leslie Bourque	Democratic	19.2%
2023	Josh Carlson	Republican	84.1%	Ludwig Gelobter	Democratic	15.9%
