= Louisiana's 13th House of Representatives district =

American legislative district

Louisiana's 13th State House of Representatives district
Representative
Jack McFarland; R–Jonesboro

Louisiana's 13th House of Representatives district is one of 105 Louisiana House of Representatives districts. It is currently represented by Republican Jack McFarland of Jonesboro.

== Geography ==
HD13 includes the communities of Jonesboro, Ringgold, Castor, Clarence, Campti and Saline, as well as the city of Winnfield.

== Election results ==
Year	Winning candidate	Party	Percent	Opponent	Party	Percent
2011	James Fannin	Democratic	100%			
2015	Jack McFarland	Republican	60.3%	Steve Casey	Democratic	39.7%
2019	Jack McFarland	Republican	100%			
2023	Jack McFarland	Republican	Cancelled			
