= 2020 United States House of Representatives elections in Louisiana =

- December 5, 2020

All 6 seats to the United States House of Representatives
	Majority party	Minority party
Party	Republican	Democratic
Last election	5	1
Seats won	5	1
Seat change	Steady	Steady
Popular vote	1,244,254	727,402
Percentage	61.55%	35.98%
Swing	▲4.34%	▼1.89%

Republican
50–60%
60–70%
70–80%
80–90%
90>%
Democratic
40–50%
50–60%
60–70%
70–80%

The 2020 United States House of Representatives elections in Louisiana were held on November 3, 2020, to elect the six U.S. representatives from the state of Louisiana, one from each of the state's six congressional districts. The elections coincided with other elections to the House of Representatives, elections to the United States Senate, and various state and local elections.

Like most Louisiana elections, these were conducted using a jungle primary that occurred on November 3, where all candidates ran on the same ballot in the primary, regardless of party. Any candidate who earned an absolute majority of the vote in the primary would be automatically declared the winner of the election. However, if in any given congressional district no candidate gained an absolute majority of the votes, a runoff election between the top two candidates within said congressional district would have been held on December 5. The 5th district was the only one that did not have its incumbent run for re-election, and also held the only runoff election.

== Overview ==
District	Republican		Democratic		Others		Total		Result
District	Votes	%	Votes	%	Votes	%	Votes	%	Result
District 1	270,330	72.21%	94,730	25.30%	9,309	2.49%	374,369	100.0%	Republican hold
District 2	63,140	19.92%	235,320	74.24%	18,522	5.84%	316,982	100.0%	Democratic hold
District 3	230,480	67.76%	100,275	29.48%	9,365	2.75%	340,120	100.0%	Republican hold
District 4	204,608	66.74%	101,970	33.26%	0	0.00%	306,578	100.0%	Republican hold
District 5	209,990	67.84%	99,566	32.16%	0	0.00%	309,556	100.0%	Republican hold
District 6	265,706	71.04%	95,541	25.55%	12,749	3.41%	373,996	100.0%	Republican hold
Total	1,244,254	61.55%	727,402	35.98%	49,945	2.47%	2,021,601	100.0%	

Popular vote
Republican	61.55%
Democratic	35.98%
Other	2.47%

House seats
Republican	83.33%
Democratic	16.67%

== District 1 ==
2020 Louisiana's 1st congressional district election
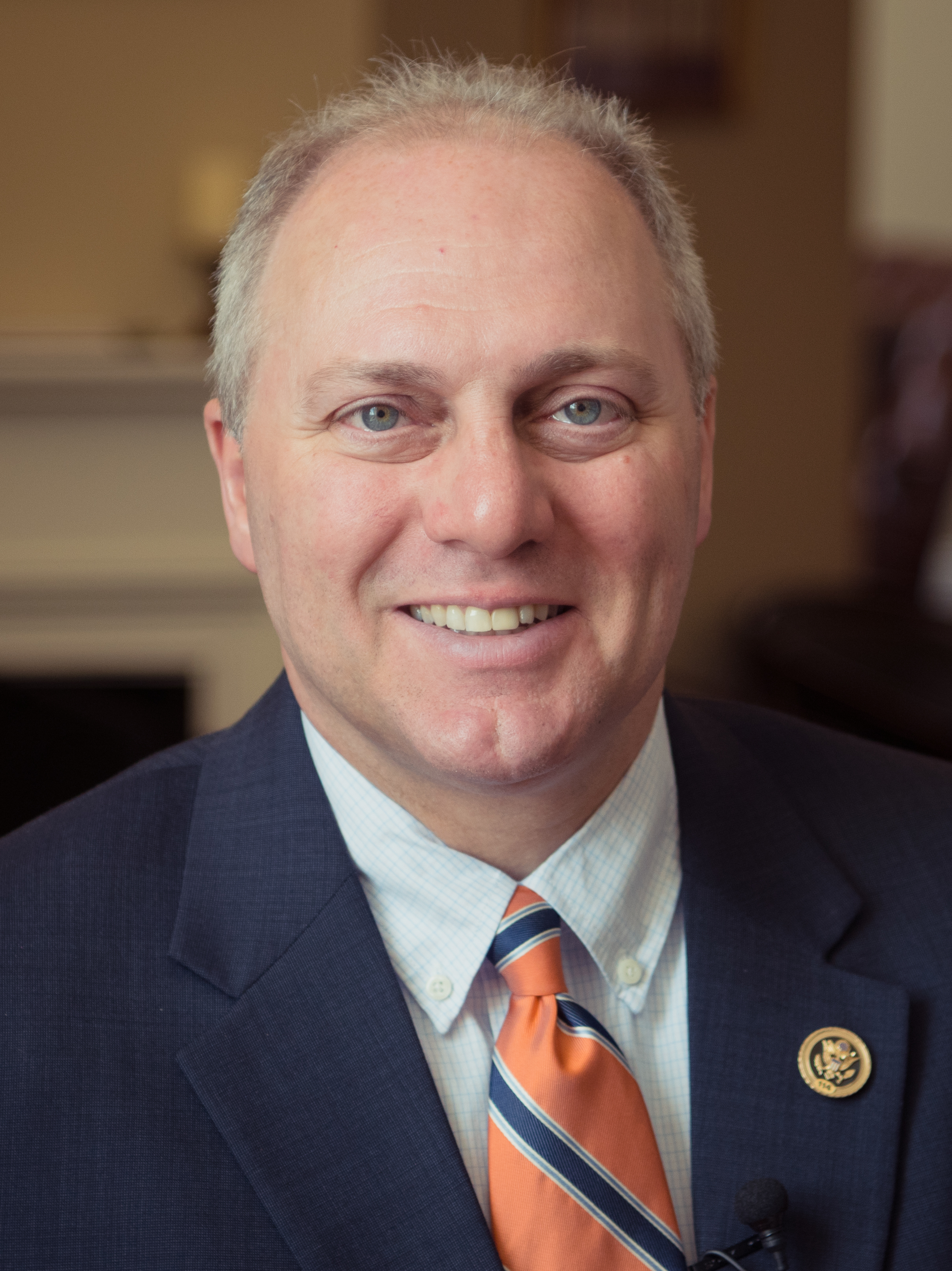

Candidate	Steve Scalise	Lee Ann Dugas
Party	Republican	Democratic
Popular vote	270,330	94,730
Percentage	72.2%	25.3%
- Parish results Scalise: 40–50% 60–70% 70–80% 80–90%
U.S. Representative before election
Steve Scalise
Republican
Elected U.S. Representative
Steve Scalise
Republican

The 1st district is based in the suburbs of New Orleans, spanning from the northern shore of Lake Pontchartrain south to the Mississippi River Delta. The incumbent was Republican Steve Scalise, who was re-elected with 71.5% of the vote in 2018.

=== Candidates ===
==== Declared ====
- Lee Ann Dugas (Democratic), activist and perennial candidate
- Howard Kearney (Libertarian), computer programmer
- Steve Scalise (Republican), incumbent U.S. representative

=== General election ===
==== Predictions ====
Source	Ranking	As of
The Cook Political Report	Safe R	July 2, 2020
Inside Elections	Safe R	June 2, 2020
Sabato's Crystal Ball	Safe R	July 2, 2020
Politico	Safe R	April 19, 2020
Daily Kos	Safe R	June 3, 2020
RCP	Safe R	June 9, 2020
Niskanen	Safe R	June 7, 2020

==== Results ====
Louisiana's 1st congressional district, 2020
Party	Candidate	Votes	%
Republican	Steve Scalise (incumbent)	270,330	72.2
Democratic	Lee Ann Dugas	94,730	25.3
Libertarian	Howard Kearney	9,309	2.5
Total votes		374,369	100.0
Republican hold			

== District 2 ==
2020 Louisiana's 2nd congressional district election
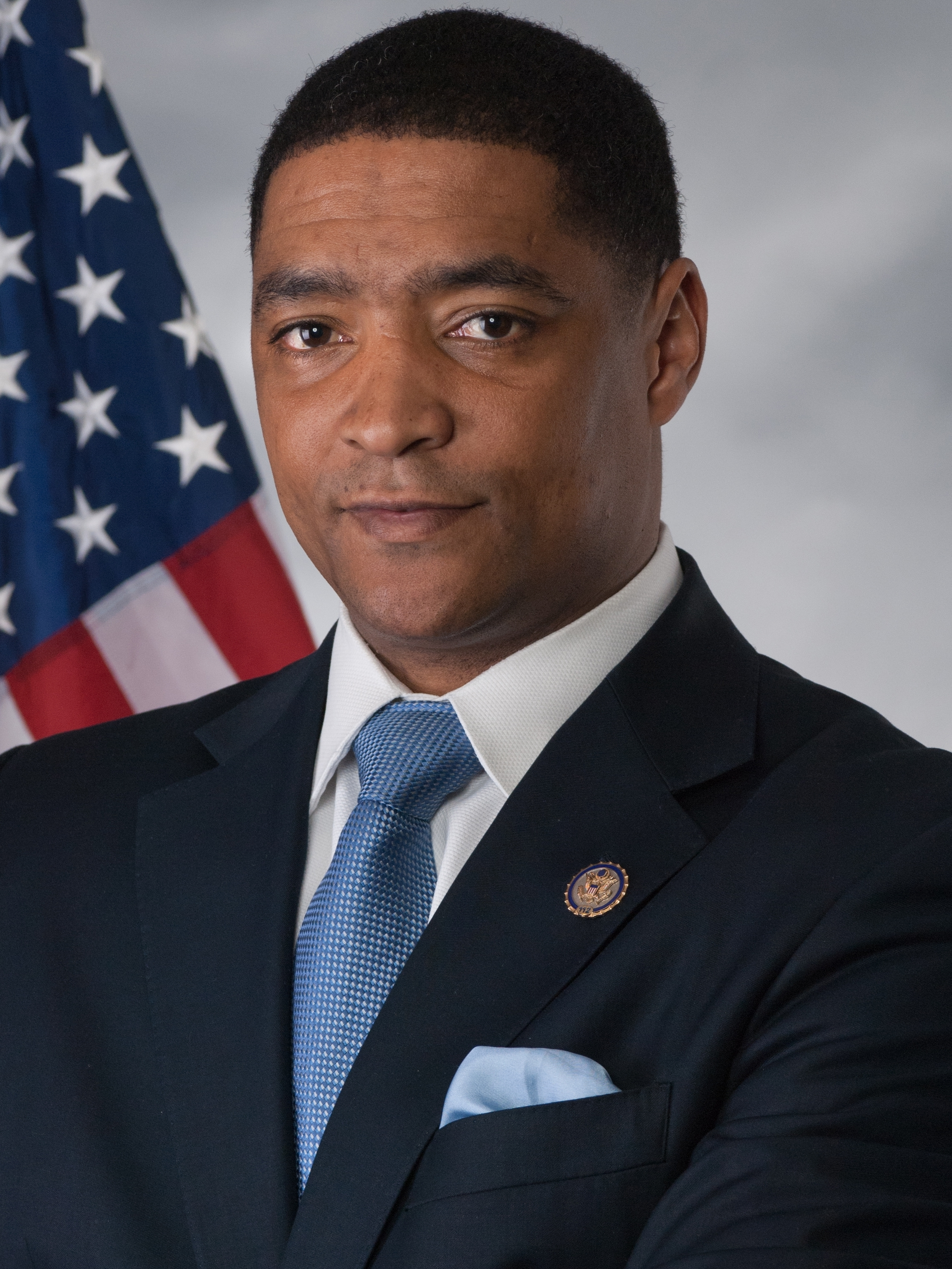

Candidate	Cedric Richmond	David M. Schilling	Glenn Adrain Harris
Party	Democratic	Republican	Democratic
Popular vote	201,636	47,575	33,684
Percentage	63.6%	15.0%	10.6%
- County results Richmond: 40–50% 50–60% 70–80% Schilling: 40–50%
U.S. Representative before election
Cedric Richmond
Democratic
Elected U.S. Representative
Cedric Richmond
Democratic

The 2nd district stretches from New Orleans to inner Baton Rouge. The seat was vacated following the resignation of incumbent Democrat Cedric Richmond on January 15, who was re-elected with 80.8% of the vote in 2018.

=== Candidates ===
==== Declared ====
- Belden "Noonie Man" Batiste (independent), activist and perennial candidate
- Glenn Adrain Harris (Democratic)
- Colby James (independent), U.S. Army veteran
- Cedric Richmond (Democratic), incumbent U.S. representative
- David Schilling (Republican)
- Sheldon Vincent (Republican), retired postal worker

=== General election ===
==== Predictions ====
Source	Ranking	As of
The Cook Political Report	Safe D	July 2, 2020
Inside Elections	Safe D	June 2, 2020
Sabato's Crystal Ball	Safe D	July 2, 2020
Politico	Safe D	April 19, 2020
Daily Kos	Safe D	June 3, 2020
RCP	Safe D	June 9, 2020
Niskanen	Safe D	June 7, 2020

==== Results ====
Louisiana's 2nd congressional district, 2020
Party	Candidate	Votes	%
Democratic	Cedric Richmond (incumbent)	201,636	63.6
Republican	David M. Schilling	47,575	15.0
Democratic	Glenn Adrain Harris	33,684	10.6
Republican	Sheldon C. Vincent Sr.	15,565	4.9
Independent	Belden "Noonie Man" Batiste	12,268	3.9
Independent	Colby James	6,254	2.0
Total votes		316,982	100.0
Democratic hold			

== District 3 ==
2020 Louisiana's 3rd congressional district election
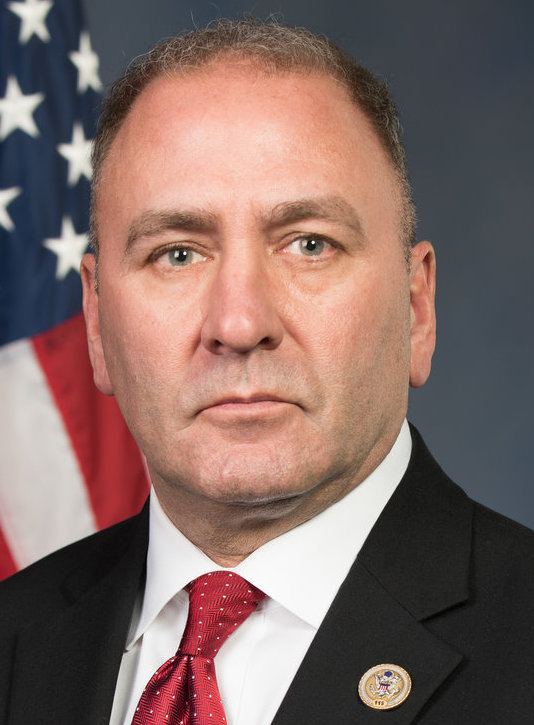

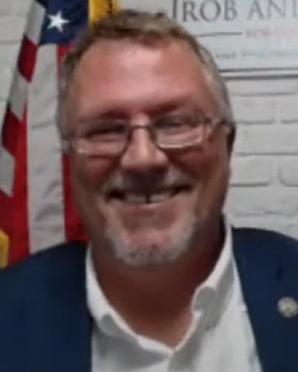
Candidate	Clay Higgins	Braylon Harris	Rob Anderson
Party	Republican	Democratic	Democratic
Popular vote	230,480	60,852	39,423
Percentage	67.8%	17.9%	11.6%
- Parish results Higgins: 60–70% 70–80% 80–90%
U.S. Representative before election
Clay Higgins
Republican
Elected U.S. Representative
Clay Higgins
Republican

The 3rd district encompasses southwestern Louisiana, taking in Lake Charles and Lafayette. The incumbent was Republican Clay Higgins, who was re-elected with 55.7% of the vote in 2018.

=== Candidates ===
==== Declared ====
- Rob Anderson (Democratic), construction worker
- Braylon Harris (Democratic), pastor
- Clay Higgins (Republican), incumbent U.S. representative
- Brandon Leleux (Libertarian), restaurant manager

=== General election ===
==== Predictions ====
Source	Ranking	As of
The Cook Political Report	Safe R	July 2, 2020
Inside Elections	Safe R	June 2, 2020
Sabato's Crystal Ball	Safe R	July 2, 2020
Politico	Safe R	April 19, 2020
Daily Kos	Safe R	June 3, 2020
RCP	Safe R	June 9, 2020
Niskanen	Safe R	June 7, 2020

==== Results ====
Louisiana's 3rd congressional district, 2020
Party	Candidate	Votes	%
Republican	Clay Higgins (incumbent)	230,480	67.8
Democratic	Braylon Harris	60,852	17.9
Democratic	Rob Anderson	39,423	11.6
Libertarian	Brandon Leleux	9,365	2.7
Total votes		340,120	100.0
Republican hold			

== District 4 ==
2020 Louisiana's 4th congressional district
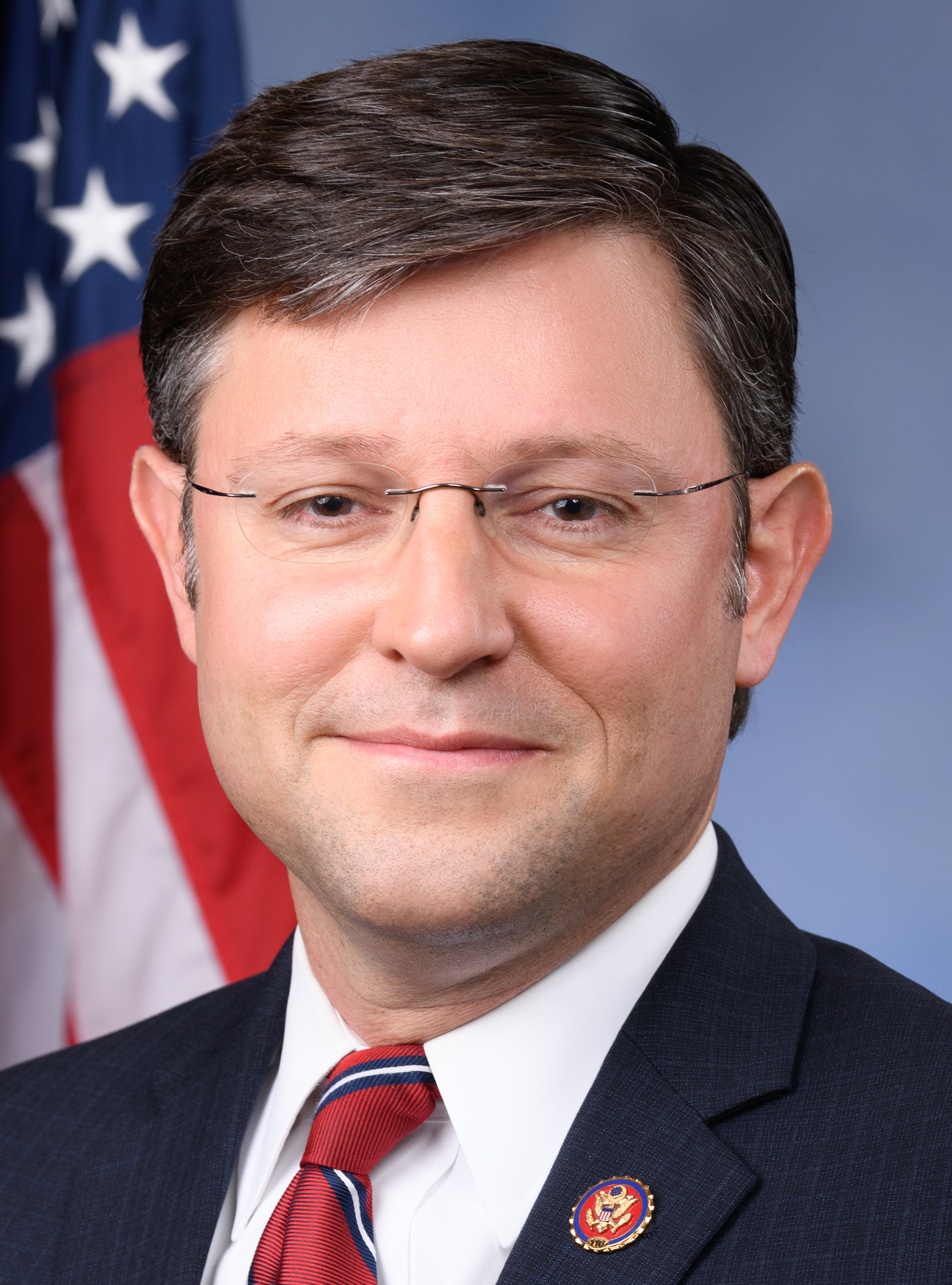

Candidate	Mike Johnson	Kenny Houston
Party	Republican	Democratic
Popular vote	185,265	78,157
Percentage	60.4%	25.5%
Candidate	Ryan Trundle	Ben Gibson
Party	Democratic	Republican
Popular vote	23,813	19,343
Percentage	7.8%	6.3%
- Parish results Johnson: 40–50% 50–60% 60–70% 70–80%
U.S. Representative before election
Mike Johnson
Republican
Elected U.S. Representative
Mike Johnson
Republican

The 4th district encompasses northwestern Louisiana, taking in the Shreveport–Bossier City metropolitan area. The incumbent was Republican Mike Johnson, who was re-elected with 64.2% of the vote in 2018.

=== Candidates ===
==== Declared ====
- Ben Gibson (Republican), firefighter
- Kenny Houston (Democratic), small business owner
- Mike Johnson (Republican), incumbent U.S. representative
- Ryan Trundle (Democratic), progressive activist

=== General election ===
==== Predictions ====
Source	Ranking	As of
The Cook Political Report	Safe R	July 2, 2020
Inside Elections	Safe R	June 2, 2020
Sabato's Crystal Ball	Safe R	July 2, 2020
Politico	Safe R	April 19, 2020
Daily Kos	Safe R	June 3, 2020
RCP	Safe R	June 9, 2020
Niskanen	Safe R	June 7, 2020

==== Results ====
Louisiana's 4th congressional district, 2020
Party	Candidate	Votes	%
Republican	Mike Johnson (incumbent)	185,265	60.4
Democratic	Kenny Houston	78,157	25.5
Democratic	Ryan Trundle	23,813	7.8
Republican	Ben Gibson	19,343	6.3
Total votes		306,578	100.0
Republican hold			

== District 5 ==
2020 Louisiana's 5th congressional district election
Candidate	Luke Letlow	Lance Harris	Sandra Christophe
Party	Republican	Republican	Democratic
First round	102,533; 33.1%	51,240; 16.6%	50,812; 16.4%
Runoff	49,183; 62.0%	30,124; 38.0%	Eliminated
Candidate	Martin Lemelle Jr.	Scotty Robinson	Allen Guillory Sr.
Party	Democratic	Republican	Republican
First round	32,186; 10.4%	23,887; 7.7%	22,496; 7.3%
Runoff	Eliminated	Eliminated	Eliminated
- Letlow: 20–30% 30–40% 40–50% 50–60% 60–70% Harris: 30–40% 40–50% Christophe: 10–20% 20–30% 30–40% Letlow: 50–60% 60–70% 70–80% Harris: 50–60%
U.S. Representative before election
Ralph Abraham
Republican
Elected U.S. Representative
Luke Letlow
(died before taking seat)
Republican

The 5th district encompasses rural northeastern Louisiana, central Louisiana, as well as the northern part of Louisiana's Florida parishes in southeast Louisiana, taking in Monroe, Alexandria, Opelousas, Amite and Bogalusa, LA. On February 26, 2020, Republican incumbent Ralph Abraham announced he would not be seeking re-election for a fourth term, honoring his pledge to only serve three terms in Congress. Luke Letlow, Abraham's former Chief of Staff, was elected to the seat on December 5, 2020. He was scheduled to assume office on January 3, 2021, but died on December 29, 2020, of complications from COVID-19. A special election for this seat was held on March 20, 2021, which was won by Letlow's widow, Julia.

=== Candidates ===
==== Declared ====
- Allen Guillory Sr. (Republican)
- Lance Harris (Republican), state representative
- Matt Hasty (Republican)
- Jesse P. Lagarde (Democratic)
- Martin Lemelle (Democratic), executive vice president of Grambling State University
- Luke Letlow (Republican), former Chief of Staff to U.S. Representative Ralph Abraham
- Scotty Robinson (Republican), Ouachita Parish police juror
- Candy Shoemaker-Cristophe (Democratic), social worker
- Phillip Snowden (Democratic)

==== Declined ====
- Ralph Abraham, incumbent U.S. representative

=== General election ===
==== Predictions ====
Source	Ranking	As of
The Cook Political Report	Safe R	July 2, 2020
Inside Elections	Safe R	June 2, 2020
Sabato's Crystal Ball	Safe R	July 2, 2020
Politico	Safe R	April 19, 2020
Daily Kos	Safe R	June 3, 2020
RCP	Safe R	June 9, 2020
Niskanen	Safe R	June 7, 2020

==== Jungle primary ====
Louisiana's 5th congressional district, 2020
Party	Candidate	Votes	%
Republican	Luke Letlow	102,533	33.1
Republican	Lance Harris	51,240	16.6
Democratic	Candy Shoemaker-Cristophe	50,812	16.4
Democratic	Martin Lemelle Jr.	32,186	10.4
Republican	Scotty Robinson	23,887	7.7
Republican	Allen Guillory Sr.	22,496	7.3
Republican	Matt Hasty	9,834	3.2
Democratic	Phillip Snowden	9,432	3.0
Democratic	Jesse P. Lagarde	7,136	2.3
Total votes		309,556	100.0

==== Runoff ====
Louisiana's 5th congressional district runoff, 2020
Party	Candidate	Votes	%
Republican	Luke Letlow	49,183	62.0
Republican	Lance Harris	30,124	38.0
Total votes		79,306	100.0
Republican hold			

== District 6 ==
2020 Louisiana's 6th congressional district election
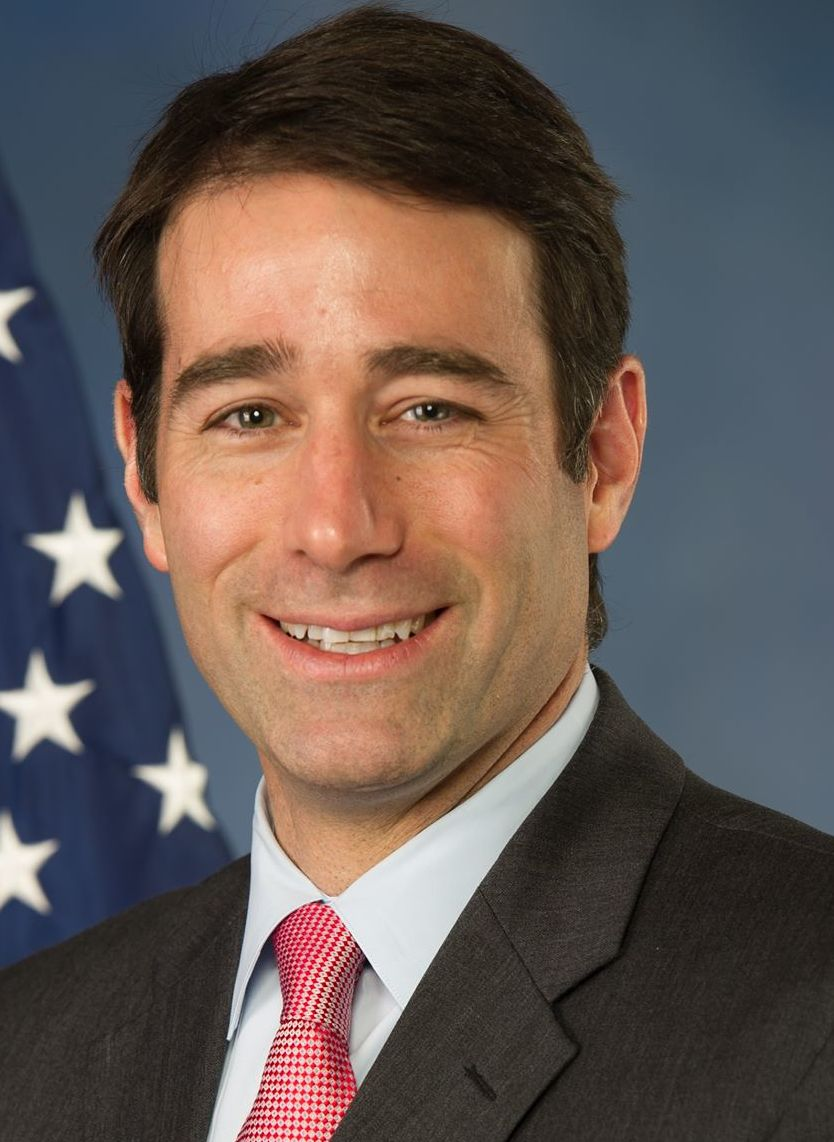

Candidate	Garret Graves	Dartanyon Williams
Party	Republican	Democratic
Popular vote	265,706	95,541
Percentage	71.0%	25.6%
- Parish results Graves: 50–60% 60–70% 70–80% 80–90% Williams: 50–60%
U.S. Representative before election
Garret Graves
Republican
Elected U.S. Representative
Garret Graves
Republican

The 6th district encompasses the suburbs of Baton Rouge. The incumbent was Republican Garret Graves, who was re-elected with 69.5% of the vote in 2018.

=== Candidates ===
==== Declared ====
- Garret Graves (Republican), incumbent U.S. representative
- Shannon Sloan (Libertarian)
- Richard Torregano (independent), retired electrical technician
- Dartanyon Williams (Democratic)

=== General election ===
==== Predictions ====
Source	Ranking	As of
The Cook Political Report	Safe R	July 2, 2020
Inside Elections	Safe R	June 2, 2020
Sabato's Crystal Ball	Safe R	July 2, 2020
Politico	Safe R	April 19, 2020
Daily Kos	Safe R	June 3, 2020
RCP	Safe R	June 9, 2020
Niskanen	Safe R	June 7, 2020

==== Results ====
Louisiana's 6th congressional district, 2020
Party	Candidate	Votes	%
Republican	Garret Graves (incumbent)	265,706	71.0
Democratic	Dartanyon Williams	95,541	25.6
Libertarian	Shannon Sloan	9,732	2.6
Independent	Richard Torregano	3,017	0.8
Total votes		373,996	100.0
Republican hold			

== See also ==
- 2020 Louisiana elections
