= Louisiana's 10th House of Representatives district =

American legislative district

Louisiana's 10th State House of Representatives district
Representative
Wayne McMahen; R–Minden

Louisiana's 10th House of Representatives district is one of 105 Louisiana House of Representatives districts. It is currently represented by Republican Wayne McMahen of Minden.

== Geography ==
HD7 includes the cities of Minden, Springhill, Doyline, Cotton Valley and Plain Dealing.

== Election results ==
Year	Winning candidate	Party	Percent	Opponent	Party	Percent
2011	Gene Reynolds	Democratic	54.7%	Jerri Ray de Pingre	Republican	43.3%
2015	Gene Reynolds	Democratic	100%			
2018 (Special)	Wayne McMahen	Republican	Cancelled			
2019	Wayne McMahen	Republican	75.1%	Creighton Wilson	Democratic	24.9%
2023	Wayne McMahen	Republican	Cancelled			
