= Louisiana's 22nd House of Representatives district =

American legislative district

Louisiana's 22nd State House of Representatives district
Representative
Gabe Firment; R–Pollock

Louisiana's 22nd House of Representatives district is one of 105 Louisiana House of Representatives districts. It is currently represented by Republican Gabe Firment of Pollock.

== Geography ==
HD22 includes the communities of Colfax, Dry Prong, Georgetown, Olla, Pollock, Tullos and Urania as well as part of the city of Natchitoches.

== Election results ==
Year	Winning candidate	Party	Percent	Opponent	Party	Percent
2011	Terry Brown	Independent	52.5%	Billy Chandler	Republican	47.5%
2015	Terry Brown	Independent	52.4%	John Stevens	Republican	47.6%
2019	Gabe Firment	Republican	64.8%	Carl Ray Lasyone	Republican	35.2%
2023	Gabe Firment	Republican	Cancelled			
