= Louisiana's 14th House of Representatives district =

American legislative district

Louisiana's 14th State House of Representatives district
Representative
Michael Charles Echols; R–Monroe

Louisiana's 14th House of Representatives district is one of 105 Louisiana House of Representatives districts. It is currently represented by Republican Michael Charles Echols of Monroe.

== Geography ==
HD14 includes a small part of the city of Monroe, as well as surrounding neighbourhoods.

== Election results ==
Year	Winning candidate	Party	Percent	Opponent	Party	Percent
2011	Jay Morris	Republican	59.1%	Sam Little	Republican	40.9%
2015	Jay Morris	Republican	100%			
2019	Michael Charles Echols	Republican	100%			
2023	Michael Charles Echols	Republican	Cancelled			
