= Louisiana's 64th House of Representatives district =

American legislative district

Louisiana's 64th State House of Representatives district
Representative
Kellee Hennessy Dickerson; R–Denham Springs

Louisiana's 64th House of Representatives district is one of 105 Louisiana House of Representatives districts. It is currently represented by Republican Kellee Hennessy Dickerson of Denham Springs.

== Geography ==
HD64 follows part of the Baton Rouge metropolitan area's, eastern boundary. It includes the community of Waston and a small part of the city of Denham Springs.

== Election results ==
Year	Winning candidate	Party	Percent	Opponent	Party	Percent
2011	Valarie Hodges	Republican	69.1%	Barry Elkins	Republican	19.8%
2015	Valarie Hodges	Republican	100%			
2019	Valarie Hodges	Republican	100%			
2023	Kellee Dickerson	Republican	60.3%	Kellie Alford	Republican	39.7%
