= Louisiana's 49th House of Representatives district =

American legislative district

Louisiana's 49th State House of Representatives district
Representative
Jacob Jules Gabriel Landry; R–Erath

Louisiana's 49th House of Representatives district is one of 105 Louisiana House of Representatives districts. It is currently represented by Republican Jacob Jules Gabriel Landry of Erath.

== Geography ==
HD49 is made up of a small part of Vermillion Parish, including the towns of Delcambre and Erath.

== Election results ==
Year	Winning candidate	Party	Percent	Opponent	Party	Percent	Opponent	Party	Percent
2011	Simone Champagne	Republican	69.5%	Larry Rader	Democratic	21.1%	John Bering	Republican	9.4%
2015 - Special	Blake Miguez	Republican	92.9%	John Bering	Republican	7.1%			
2015	Blake Miguez	Republican	84.7%	John Bering	Republican	15.3%			
2019	Blake Miguez	Republican	100%						
2023	Jacob Landry	Republican	64%	Sanders Derise	Republican	20.1%	David Eaton	Republican	16%
