= Tom Willmott =

American attorney, nurse and politician

Member of the Louisiana House of Representatives from the 92nd district
- In office January 14, 2008 – November 29, 2016
- Preceded by: Glenn Ansardi
- Succeeded by: Joseph A. Stagni

Personal details
- Party: Republican
- Spouse: Sherry Kleinpeter
- Education: Southeastern Louisiana University; Southern University Law Center; Louisiana State University
- Occupation: Attorney, Nurse

Tom Willmott is an American attorney, nurse and politician. He served as a Republican member for the 92nd district of the Louisiana House of Representatives.

Willmott attended at the Southeastern Louisiana University, where he earned his bachelor's degree. He then attended at the Southern University Law Center, where he earned his Juris Doctor degree. Willmott lastly attended at Louisiana State University, where he earned his Associate degree. He was specialized as a nurse. In 2008, Willmott won the election for the 92nd district of the Louisiana House of Representatives. He succeeded Glenn Arsardi. In 2016, Willmott was succeeded by Joseph A. Stagni for the 92nd district, in which he was voted as a councilman of the Kenner City Council. His term had lapsed on June 30, 2018.
