= Josh Carlson =

American politician

Member of the Louisiana House of Representatives from the 43rd district
- Incumbent
- Assumed office January 8, 2024
- Preceded by: Stuart Bishop

Personal details
- Party: Republican
- Education: University of Louisiana at Lafayette (BS)

Josh Carlson is an American politician serving in the Louisiana House of Representatives from the 43rd district. A member of the Republican Party, Carlson has been in office since January 8, 2024. His current term ends on January 10, 2028.

== Early life and education ==
Carlson attended Lafayette High School and obtained a BS in Business Administration from the University of Louisiana at Lafayette. For ten years, Carlson volunteered as a youth pastor. Carlson's father, Gerald Carlson, was the Dean of the College of Education at the University of Louisiana at Lafayette.

== Career ==
On November 19, 2019, Carlson was elected to the Lafayette Parish Council, representing District 3.

In 2021, Carlson nominated Robert Judge to the Lafayette Public Library Board from a group of seven candidates, including educators. Judge had previously opposed a drag queen storytime event in 2018. Subsequently, residents filed a lawsuit against Carlson and other council members, claiming they violated open meetings law by discussing Judge's appointment privately before the council meeting. However, a judge ruled that the residents did not meet the burden of proof.

During his time on the board, Judge had an LGBTQ+ advocate arrested for speaking out of turn and removed an anti-censorship speaker with armed officers, leading to a federal lawsuit for free speech violations. The lawsuit was settled in July 2025 for $13,200 to the plaintiffs, but defense costs exceeded $100,000 in taxpayer funds. Judge also attempted to terminate a library manager without proper notice, halted plans for a Northeast Regional Library in favor of leasing space, and sought to change the library's mission statement to remove "recreation and cultural enrichment" programs. In December 2025, Judge filed a lawsuit against Parish Councilman AB Rubin and the Lafayette Consolidated Government, alleging defamation and violations of the First Amendment. The suit arose from a February 2025 board meeting where Judge attempted to delay construction of a library branch in a predominantly Black, low-income community. Rubin publicly declared Judge "a cancer" and stated he had been "trying to get rid of you since day one." Judge alleges Rubin's removal efforts were driven by religious discrimination and hostility toward his Catholic faith.

On October 14, 2023, Carlson was elected to represent Louisiana District 43, receiving 84% of the votes (9,342), while Ludwig Gelobter garnered 16% (1,770).

In 2024, Carlson introduced House Bill 414, which aimed to eliminate exceptions for public libraries from the state law on obscenity. This bill died in committee. Carlson also introduced House Bill 974, which proposed removing the requirement for directors of parish library systems to obtain state certification. This certification requires librarians to pass an exam and hold a master's degree in library science.

The search for a new director for the Lafayette Public Library triggered the push for House Bill 974. The library board, led by then-president Robert Judge, had unlawfully terminated the previous director, Danny Gillane, due to a contentious relationship with some board members. Judge claimed that the board felt that Gillane was undermining them. They later rescinded the termination, allowing him to resign, and subsequently hired him as interim director while they looked for a permanent replacement. In August 2024, the board voted unanimously to rehire Gillane as director.

House Bill 974 served as a substitute for House Bill 168, which stalled in the House Municipal, Parochial, and Cultural Affairs Committee. The updated version of the bill was referred to the House Education Committee by Representative Bryan Fontenot and was passed successfully.

Carlson opposed House Bill 98, introduced by Representative Mandie Landry, which aimed to remove the language from the Louisiana Constitution that defines marriage as a union between one man and one woman. Carlson argued that the proposed constitutional amendment "tramples on the religious values that have been upheld and are valued by a majority of the state of Louisiana."

Carlson introduced Act 476, which was signed into law. It prohibits a person from mailing or delivering multiple absentee ballots for non-family members. Disability Rights Louisiana, an organization advocating for individuals with disabilities, filed a lawsuit under the federal Voting Rights Act against the law.

House Bill 466, introduced by Rep. Carlson, provides salary increases for Louisiana teachers and school support staff. The bill proposes raising teacher salaries by $2,000 and support staff salaries by $1,000, funded by savings from eliminating three education trust funds to pay down teacher retirement system debts. After passing both legislative chambers unanimously, it was enacted as Act No. 366 on June 20, 2025. The law mandates permanent salary increases, requiring school systems to use savings generated by the state’s payments toward unfunded liabilities in the Teachers’ Retirement System of Louisiana. Full implementation remains contingent upon voter approval of a related constitutional amendment.
