= Louisiana's 4th House of Representatives district =

American legislative district

Louisiana's 4th State House of Representatives district
Representative
Daryl Joy Walters; D–Shreveport

Louisiana's 4th House of Representatives district is one of 105 Louisiana House of Representatives districts. It is currently represented by Democrat Daryl Joy Walters of Shreveport.

== Geography ==
HD4 includes the towns of Timberlane and Lakeview, and the neighbourhoods of Reisor, Flournoy and Cannon. Additionally, the district includes a small part of the city of Shreveport (including its airport).

== Election results ==
Year	Winning candidate	Party	Percent	Opponent	Party	Percent	Opponent	Party	Percent
2011	Patrick Williams	Democratic	100%						
2015	Cedric Glover	Democratic	52.7%	Fred Moss IV	Democratic	26.7%	Reginald Johnson	Democratic	20.6%
2019	Cedric Glover	Democratic	100%						
2023	Daryl Joy Walters	Democratic	53.8%	Jasmine R. Green	Democratic	46.2%			
