= Luke Letlow =

American politician (1979–2020)

Member-elect of the U.S. House of Representatives from Louisiana's 5th district
- Died before assuming office
- Preceded by: Ralph Abraham (as member)
- Succeeded by: Julia Letlow (as member)

Personal details
- Born: Luke Joshua Letlow; December 6, 1979 Monroe, Louisiana, U.S.
- Died: December 29, 2020 (aged 41) Shreveport, Louisiana, U.S.
- Cause of death: Complications due to COVID-19
- Party: Republican
- Spouse: Julia Barnhill (m. 2013)
- Children: 2
- Education: Louisiana Tech University (BS)

Luke Joshua Letlow (December 6, 1979 – December 29, 2020) was an American businessman and politician from Louisiana. A Republican, he was elected to the United States House of Representatives for Louisiana's 5th congressional district in 2020, but died from complications caused by COVID-19 five days before he was due to take office in the 117th Congress. Before his election to Congress, Letlow served as chief of staff to Representative Ralph Abraham. Three months after his death, Letlow's widow Julia was elected to the vacant seat in a special election.

== Early life and education ==
Letlow was raised in the unincorporated community of Start, east of Monroe, and was the youngest son of Dianne and Johnny Letlow. He graduated from Ouachita Christian High School and earned a Bachelor of Science in computer information systems from Louisiana Tech University in 2003. As a student at Louisiana Tech, Letlow was an intern for John Cooksey in 2000 when Cooksey represented Louisiana's 5th congressional district in the United States House of Representatives. He served as chairman of the Louisiana Tech College Republicans in 2001 and of the Louisiana Federation of College Republicans in 2002.

== Career ==
Letlow worked for Bobby Jindal during Jindal's tenure in the United States House of Representatives for Louisiana's 1st congressional district as his congressional district director from 2005 to 2008, and during Jindal's first term as governor of Louisiana as director of intergovernmental affairs from 2008 to 2010. He then worked as director of government and community affairs for QEP Resources, an energy company based in Denver. Letlow returned to Louisiana in 2014 to serve as campaign manager for Ralph Abraham during his election for Louisiana's 5th congressional district. He served as Abraham's Chief of Staff during his three-term tenure.

On March 9, 2020, after Abraham honored his pledge not to serve more than three terms, Letlow announced his candidacy. Abraham publicly endorsed him concurrent with Letlow's announcement. In the nonpartisan blanket primary on November 3, Letlow finished in first place with 33% of the vote, while state Representative Lance Harris, a fellow Republican, finished second with 17%. Letlow won the December 5 runoff election with 62% of the vote. The district is Louisiana's largest by area, covering most of 24 parishes, and includes Alexandria and Monroe, the population hubs, and Opelousas in Acadiana and Bogalusa in the Florida Parishes.

Despite the COVID-19 pandemic, Letlow wore a mask only sporadically during his campaign, and was photographed speaking indoors to constituents when masks were not being worn by him or those gathered. In October, he had encouraged Louisiana officials to relax pandemic restrictions, warning, "We're now at a place if we do not open our economy, we're in real danger."

== Personal life and death ==
Letlow lived in Start, Louisiana, with his wife, Julia, and their two young children.

On December 18, 2020, Letlow announced that he had tested positive for COVID-19. He was hospitalized in Monroe. After his condition deteriorated, he was transferred to the intensive care unit (ICU) of Ochsner LSU Health Shreveport on December 23. On December 29, Letlow died from the virus at age 41. The hospital reported that he had no underlying conditions when admitted but died in the ICU after suffering a "cardiac event" and could not be resuscitated.

Louisiana Governor John Bel Edwards ordered flags in the state to be flown at half-staff on the day of Letlow's funeral. He also scheduled the special election to fill Letlow's vacancy for March 20, 2021, with an April runoff if needed. His widow Julia Letlow ran in the special election, and won, avoiding a runoff.

== See also ==
- List of United States representatives-elect who never took their seats

U.S. House of Representatives
Preceded by Ralph Abraham	Member-elect of the U.S. House of Representatives from Louisiana's 5th congressional district 2020	Succeeded by Julia Letlow
