= Barbara Norton =

American politician (born 1946)

Member of the Louisiana House of Representatives for District 3
- In office 2008 – January 13, 2020
- Succeeded by: Tammy Phelps

Personal details
- Born: February 1946 (age 80)
- Party: Democratic

Barbara Ann McCray Norton (born February 1946) is an American politician who served in the Louisiana House of Representatives. She was inducted into the Louisiana Center for Women in Government and Business Hall of Fame in 2005. Norton endorsed the Hillary Clinton 2016 presidential campaign. Barbara Norton has hosted a weekly KOKA radio show for over 30 years. She was a candidate for District 39 in 2019 and 2023.
