= Louisiana's 92nd House of Representatives district =

American legislative district

Louisiana's 92nd State House of Representatives district
Representative
Joe Stagni; R–Kenner

Louisiana's 92nd House of Representatives district is one of 105 Louisiana House of Representatives districts. It is currently represented by Republican Joe Stagni.

== Geography ==
HD92 includes the Census Designated Places of Metairie, River Ridge, and the city of Kenner.

== Election results ==
Year	Winning candidate	Party	Percent	Opponent	Party	Percent	Opponent	Party	Percent
2011	Tom Willmott	Republican	100%						
2015	Tom Willmott	Republican	100%						
2017*	Joe Stagni	Republican	73.7%	Gisela Chevalier	Republican	13.3%	Chuck Toney	Democratic	13%
2019	Joe Stagni	Republican	100%						
2023	Joe Stagni	Republican	69.7%	Michael Sigur	Republican	30.3%			

"*" indicates Special Election
