= Charles Addison Riddle III =

American politician

Charles Addison Riddle III born in Marksville, Louisiana on June 8, 1955 is a Louisiana lawyer and Democratic politician. Riddle was elected to the 28th district of the Louisiana House of Representatives in 1992. Riddle was then re-elected in 1995, defeating two challengers in the first stage of the Louisiana primary. Riddle ran unopposed in 1999, serving through 2003. Riddle was also elected as the 33rd district attorney of Avoyelles Parish in 2002.

== District Attorney ==
Riddle ran for the office of district attorney of Avoyelles Parish, representing the 12th judicial district, in 2002. He won the election, taking office in 2003. Riddle then ran unopposed in 2008 and 2014. He sought re-election successfully in 2020. Riddle is, as of 2024, serving his fourth six-year term as the district attorney.

Riddle was elected as the president of the Louisiana District Attorneys' Association for the term 2008 - 2009. He also served as a past president of the LDAA, including as a chairman of the legislative committee.
