= Robert Billiot =

American politician

Mayor-elect of Westwego, Louisiana
- Assuming office TBD
- Succeeding: Joe Peoples
- In office 1990–2008

Member of the Louisiana House of Representatives from the 83rd district
- In office 2008–2020
- Succeeded by: Kyle Green Jr

Personal details
- Born: 1953 (age 72–73)
- Party: Democratic
- Education: Nicholls State University (BA)

Robert E. Billiot (born November 1953) is an American politician who served as a member of the Louisiana House of Representatives for the 83rd district from 2008 to 2020.

== Education ==
Billot graduated from West Jefferson High School in Harvey, Louisiana and earned a Bachelor of Arts degree from Nicholls State University.

== Career ==
Billiot served as the mayor of Westwego, Louisiana from 1990 to 2008. He was elected to the Louisiana House of Representatives in 2007 and assumed office in 2008. During his tenure, Billiot worked to expand the Louisiana Drug Policy Board. He also sponsored legislation to fund workers' compensation coverage for volunteer firefighters. Billiot was unable to seek re-election in 2019 due to term limits and left office in 2020.

In March 2021, Billiot was re-elected mayor of Westwego, Louisiana.
