= Julie Stokes =

American politician

Member of the Louisiana House of Representatives from the 79th district
- In office March 2013 – January 13, 2020
- Preceded by: Tony Ligi
- Succeeded by: Debbie Villio

Personal details
- Born: January 23, 1970 (age 56)
- Party: Republican
- Spouse: Larry Stokes
- Children: 2
- Education: University of New Orleans (BS)

Julie Skinner Stokes (born January 23, 1970) is an American politician and Certified Public Accountant who served as a member of the Louisiana House of Representatives for the 79th district from 2013 to 2020.

== Early life and education ==
Stokes is the only child of Doris Guerin Skinner, a Metairie native, and the late Edward Thomas Skinner. In 1992, Stokes received her Bachelor of Science in accounting from the University of New Orleans. She attended Jefferson Parish Public Schools and the University of New Orleans. After four years on full academic scholarship at UNO, she received her Bachelor of Science in accounting. She started working at a Big Four accounting firm and passed the CPA exam on her first effort.

== Career ==
From 2000 to 2010, Stokes operated Julie S. Stokes, CPA, but thereafter became the chief financial officer of Stokes & Associates. She is also a tax preparer.

On March 2, 2013, Stokes won a special election to the Louisiana House to succeed fellow Republican Tony Ligi, who resigned from office to become director of the Jefferson Business Council. By defeating three fellow Republicans, Stokes received 55 percent of the vote to fill the nearly three years remaining in Li's term. Businessman Jack Rizzuto, a candidate defeated by Ligi in 2007, finished second in the 2013 contest with 31 percent of the ballots cast. Allison Bent Bowler, the chief financial officer at Benjamin Franklin High School in New Orleans received nine percent of the vote. No Democrat ran for the position.

In her freshman legislative year in 2013, Stokes was rated at 71 percent by the Louisiana Association of Business and Industry. Stokes servesdon the Health & Welfare, Labor & Industrial Relations, and Ways & Means committees.

On November 6, 2018, Stokes finished in fifth place with 163,769 votes (11 percent) in the special election to fill the position of secretary of state, vacated by Republican Tom Schedler. The two top vote-getters, Republican interim secretary Kyle Ardoin and Democrat Gwen Collins-Greenup, met in a December 8 runoff contest.

== Personal life ==
Stokes resides in Kenner with her husband Larry and their two children, Brandon and Taylor. Until her diagnosis of breast cancer in 2017, Stokes was a candidate for Louisiana state treasurer in the special election scheduled for October 14, 2017 to choose a successor to John Neely Kennedy, who was elected in 2016 to the United States Senate. Stokes underwent five months of chemotherapy and has been declared cancer-free.

Louisiana House of Representatives
Preceded by Tony Ligi	Member of the Louisiana House of Representatives for the 79th district (Jefferson Parish); 2013–present	Incumbent
