= Kimberly Coates =

American politician

Member of the Louisiana House of Representatives from the 73rd district
- Incumbent
- Assumed office January 8, 2024
- Preceded by: Bill Wheat

Personal details
- Party: Republican
- Education: Southeastern Louisiana University (BA)
- Occupation: Business Marketing

Kimberly Landry Coates is an American politician serving as a member of the Louisiana House of Representatives from the 73rd district. A member of the Republican Party, Coates represents parts of Tangipahoa Parish and has been in office since January 8, 2024.

In 2025, Coates co-authored SB46, a bill to ban chemtrails.
