= Jason Brian DeWitt =

American politician

Jason DeWitt

Member of the Louisiana House of Representatives from the 25th district
- Incumbent
- Assumed office January 8, 2024
- Preceded by: Lance Harris

Personal details
- Party: Republican
- Education: Northwestern State University (BS)

Jason Brian DeWitt is an American politician serving as a member of the Louisiana House of Representatives from the 25th district, representing Natchitoches Parish and Rapides Parish. He assumed office on January 8, 2024.

== Career ==
DeWitt is the owner of Terminator Pest and Pond Management, LLC. He is also a former first responder with the Louisiana Department of Environmental Quality. DeWitt was elected to the 25th district seat in the Louisiana House of Representatives with 59% of the vote over Trish Leleux, who received 41% on October 14, 2023.
