= Lafayette Public Library =

The Lafayette Public Library (LPL) is the public library system serving Lafayette Parish, Louisiana.

== History ==
The "Women's Literary Club" established a fund for the first lending library in Lafayette in 1897. In 1932 the "Les Vingt Quatre Club" started a library for children during the Great Depression, which consisted of 50 volumes located in the Parish courthouse. The Lafayette Municipal Library was created by the Louisiana state government in 1942. On August 6, 1946, its doors officially opened for public use. By 1953, the parish library was expanded to have 10 branch locations, including a bookmobile program. On January 29, 1973, doors opened to the new location of the main library branch in downtown Lafayette (it remains there today). In 2002, parish voters approved a $40 million bond issue that would not only renovate the main library, but would also build four new regional branch libraries to serve the north, south, east, and west regions of the parish. As of 2019, all four of these regional locations have been built and opened to the public.

== Branches ==
At present, there are nine library locations. Four are within the city of Lafayette, and five branches are in the rest of the parish.

- Main Library
- Butler Memorial Branch
- Chenier Branch
- Duson Branch
- East Regional Library
- West Regional Library
- Milton Branch
- North Regional Library
- South Regional Library

== Friends of the Lafayette Public Library ==
In 1979, the Friends of the Library for the Lafayette Public Library was established to support the library and raise community awareness of library tax issues. The Friends hold semi-annual book sales and donations twice a year. Each sale includes both hardback and paperback books of various genres for purchase, sold by the inch: $1 an inch for hardcover books and 50 cents an inch for paperback books. In 2022 the group reached its goal by donating over one million dollars to support and promote the library systems and its programs.

The Friends of the Lafayette Public Library also provide scholarships to Louisiana State University students from Lafayette Parish to go toward pursuing library science degrees.
