= Jacob Jules Gabriel Landry =

American politician

Jacob Landry

Member of the Louisiana House of Representatives from the 49th district
- Incumbent
- Assumed office January 8, 2024
- Preceded by: Blake Miguez

Personal details
- Party: Republican
- Education: University of Louisiana at Lafayette; University of Southwestern Louisiana

Jacob Jules Gabriel Landry is an American politician serving as a member of the Louisiana House of Representatives from the 49th district. A member of the Republican Party, Landry has been in office since January 8, 2024.

== Career ==
Landry first ran to represent District 49 in 2023 and won the October 14, 2023 election with 64% against Sanders Derise's 20% and David Eaton's 16%.
