= Kellee Hennessy Dickerson =

American politician (born 1970)

Member of the Louisiana House of Representatives from the 64th district
- Incumbent
- Assumed office January 8, 2024
- Preceded by: Valarie Hodges

Personal details
- Born: February 6, 1970 (age 56)
- Party: Republican
- Education: (BA), Southeastern Louisiana University
- Occupation: Journalist

Kellee Hennessy Dickerson (born February 6, 1970) is an American politician from Watson, Louisiana, serving as a member of the Louisiana House of Representatives from the 64th district. A member of the Republican Party, Dickerson represents parts of East Baton Rouge Parish and Livingston Parish and has been in office since January 8, 2024.

== Career ==
Kellee Hennessy Dickerson is a graduate of Live Oak High School and Southeastern Louisiana University. She is a former anchor and reporter for WAFB and served for twelve years on the Livingston Parish School Board. She is a member of the Immaculate Conception Catholic Church in Denham Springs.

In 2023, Dickerson ran to represent District 64, successfully advancing to the runoff after the Jungle primary on October 14, 2023. In the runoff election held on November 18, 2023, she faced Kellie Alford and was declared the winner, receiving 60.3% of the votes.

=== Controversy ===
In July 2023, Dickerson was fined $1,500 by the state Board of Ethics for violating regulations related to the improper hiring of a Live Oak High School teacher for contract work at the school beyond the teacher's educational duties. At the time, Dickerson oversaw Live Oak District funds and hired a vocational education teacher to lay a clay foundation on the campus for a storage building. The teacher was also hired to move building materials from the high school parking lot and to remove trees near the Live Oak High School campus to divert runoff rainwater from collecting on the parking lot of the new sports complex. In total, the teacher was paid more than $34,000 for the work. The Board of Ethics' opinion against Dickerson cited two Louisiana statutes that prohibit public employees from doing contract work for their employers.

In 2024, she introduced House Bill 777, which would have criminalized library workers and libraries for joining the American Library Association, among other regulations. Whoever violates the bill "shall be fined not more than one thousand dollars or be imprisoned, with or without hard labor, for not more than two years, or both." Dickerson also helped fund the Louisiana Freedom Caucus. The caucus formed a PAC that sent anti-LGBTQ+ texts to voters.

In 2025, Dickerson introduced House Bill 160, which would mandate the state Board of Ethics to disclose the identities of individuals who file complaints. The bill would also impose stricter limitations on when the board could conduct investigations. In response, members of the Board of Ethics sent a letter to state lawmakers, warning that the bill could have a chilling effect on free speech.

Candidate	Party	First round		Second round	
Candidate	Party	Votes	%	Votes	%
Kellee Hennessy Dickerson	Republican	6,004	49.42	4,436	60.27
Kellie Alford	Republican	3,609	29.70	2,924	39.73
Garry Talbert	Republican	2,537	20.88		
Total		12,150	100.00	7,360	100.00
Source: Louisiana Secretary of State
