= Kyle Green =

American attorney and politician

Minority Leader of the Louisiana House of Representatives
- Incumbent
- Assumed office October 29, 2025
- Preceded by: Matthew Willard

Member of the Louisiana House of Representatives from the 83rd district
- Incumbent
- Assumed office January 13, 2020
- Preceded by: Robert Billiot

Personal details
- Born: 1986 or 1987 (age 39–40) Marrero, Louisiana, U.S.
- Party: Democratic
- Education: Southern University (BA, JD)

Kyle M. Green Jr. (born 1986/1987) is an American attorney and politician serving as a member of the Louisiana House of Representatives from the 83rd district. Elected in 2019, he assumed office on January 13, 2020.

== Early life and education ==
Green is a native of Marrero, Louisiana, in Jefferson Parish, a suburb of the Greater New Orleans Metropolitan Area. After graduating from Archbishop Shaw High School in 2005, he earned a Bachelor of Arts degree in political science from Southern University in 2009, and a Juris Doctor from the Southern University Law Center in 2015.

== Career ==
During college, Green was an intern in the United States House of Representatives. He was also a substitute teacher in the East Baton Rouge Parish Public Schools. In 2011 and 2012, Green worked as a State Farm insurance agent. In 2014 and 2015, he was a law clerk for the Louisiana Department of Insurance. Green later established a private legal practice and served as assistant Attorney General of Louisiana. Green was elected to the Louisiana House of Representatives in 2019. He assumed office on January 13, 2020, succeeding Robert Billiot.

== Legal issues ==
On May 21 2025 at approximately 2:30 a.m., Troopers with Louisiana State Police Troop B responded to a single-vehicle crash on US 90B near Ames Blvd. in Jefferson Parish. As a result of the crash investigation, State Representative Green was arrested for DWI and child endangerment.

The initial investigation revealed that Green was traveling westbound on US 90B in a 2023 Honda Accord when he ran off the roadway to the right and struck a concrete barrier. Upon arrival at the scene, Troopers noticed signs of impairment and conducted a series of standardized field sobriety tests. Green was subsequently placed under arrest. At the time of the crash, Green’s three children were in the Honda, uninjured, and were released to a family member.

Troopers transported Green, who was uninjured in the crash, to the Jefferson Parish Correctional Center, where he refused to provide a breath sample. Details of the incident and arrest were provided to an on-call judge, who approved a search warrant that allowed Troopers to obtain blood samples. Troopers booked Green for First Offense DWI, three counts of DWI with Child Endangerment, Careless Operation, Improper Lane Use, and a Traffic Attachment from Jefferson Parish.

Louisiana House of Representatives
| Preceded by Matthew Willard | Minority Leader of the Louisiana House of Representatives; 2025–present | Incumbent |
