= Bill Wheat =

American politician

Member of the Louisiana Senate from the 37th district
- Incumbent
- Assumed office January 8, 2024
- Preceded by: Barrow Peacock

Member of the Louisiana House of Representatives from the 73rd district
- In office January 13, 2020 – January 8, 2024
- Preceded by: Stephen Pugh
- Succeeded by: Kimberly Coates

Personal details
- Born: 1958 or 1959 (age 66–67)
- Party: Republican
- Education: Louisiana State University, Baton Rouge (BS); Louisiana State University, New Orleans (DVM)

William Wheat Jr. (born 1958/1959) is an American politician and veterinarian. He currently serves as a member of the Louisiana Senate representing the 37th district since 2024. He previously served in the Louisiana House of Representatives, representing the 73rd district from 2020 to 2024. As of 2023, Wheat is also a candidate in the Louisiana State Senate District 37 election.

Wheat is known for his efforts to regulate vaping products in Louisiana. He authored a bill aimed at banning the sale of flavored vaping products in the state, addressing public health concerns related to vaping.

In addition to his legislative work, Bill Wheat's district, the 73rd district, was affected by the August 2023 wildfires in Louisiana, highlighting the challenges and responsibilities he faces as a representative during emergencies.
