= Tammy Phelps =

American politician

Member of the Louisiana House of Representatives from the 3rd district
- Incumbent
- Assumed office January 13, 2020
- Preceded by: Barbara Norton

Personal details
- Party: Democratic
- Education: Louisiana Tech University (BS); Amberton University (MBA)

Tammy T. Phelps is an American politician serves as a member of the Louisiana House of Representatives from the 3rd district. She assumed office on January 13, 2020.

== Education ==
After graduating from Captain Shreve High School, Phelps earned a Bachelor of Science degree in business administration from Louisiana Tech University and a Master of Business Administration in strategic leadership from Amberton University.

== Career ==
Outside of politics, Phelps works as an education administrator. She was elected to the Louisiana House of Representatives in November 2019 and assumed office on January 13, 2020.

== Election history ==
2023 Louisiana House of Representatives District 3 election
Primary election
Party	Candidate	Votes	%
Democratic	Tammy Phelps (incumbent)	Uncontested	100

Louisiana House of Representatives
Preceded by Barbara Norton	Louisiana State Representative for District 3 (Caddo Parish); 2020 –	Succeeded by Incumbent
