= Barbara Reich Freiberg =

American politician

Barbara Freiberg

Member of the Louisiana House of Representatives from the 70th district
- Incumbent
- Assumed office January 13, 2020
- Preceded by: Franklin Foil

Personal details
- Party: Republican
- Education: Louisiana Tech University (BA); University of North Carolina at Chapel Hill (MA)

Barbara Reich Freiberg is a retired educator and politician serving as a member of the Louisiana House of Representatives from the 70th district since 2020. In 2010 Freiberg was an elected member of the East Baton Rouge Parish School Board for District 7 and was re-elected in 2014. She was elected to the Metro Council in Baton Rouge on December 10, 2016, representing District 12 until her election to the Louisiana House of Representatives in 2019.

== Election history ==
Louisiana House of Representatives October 12, 2019 jungle primary District 70
Candidate	Party	Votes	%
Belinda Davis	Democratic	5,504	38.07
Michael DiResto	Republican	2,978	20.60
Mallory Mayeux	Libertarian	478	3.31
Barbara Reich Freiberg	Republican	4,151	28.71
"Ricky" Sheldon	Republican	1,347	9.32
Total		14,458	100.00

Louisiana House of Representatives November 16, 2019 runoff election District 70
Candidate	Party	Votes	%
Belinda Davis	Democratic	7,891	47.40
Barbara Reich Freiberg	Republican	8,758	52.60
Total		16,649	100.00

Louisiana House of Representatives October 14, 2023 jungle primary District 70
Candidate	Party	Votes	%
Brent Campanella	Republican	1,307	12.79
Barbara Reich Freiberg	Republican	3,971	38.87
"Steve" Myers	Democratic	2,775	27.16
Jennie Seals	Republican	2,163	21.17
Total		10,216	100.00

Louisiana House of Representatives November 18, 2023 runoff election District 70
Candidate	Party	Votes	%
Barbara Reich Freiberg	Republican	4,485	64.94
"Steve" Myers	Democratic	2,421	35.06
Total		6,906	100.00

Louisiana House of Representatives
Preceded by Franklin Foil	Louisiana State Representative for District 70 (East Baton Rouge Parish); 2020–	Succeeded by Incumbent
