= Debbie Villio =

American politician

Member of the Louisiana House of Representatives from the 79th district
- Incumbent
- Assumed office January 13, 2020
- Preceded by: Julie Stokes

Personal details
- Party: Republican
- Education: University of New Orleans (BA); Loyola University New Orleans (JD)

Debbie Villio is an American attorney and politician serving as a member of the Louisiana House of Representatives from the 79th district. Elected in November 2019, she assumed office on January 13, 2020.

== Early life and education ==
Villio is a native of Kenner, Louisiana. She earned a Bachelor of Arts degree from the University of New Orleans in 1985 and a Juris Doctor from the Loyola University New Orleans College of Law in 1988.

== Career ==
From 1988 to 1998, Villio served as an assistant district attorney for St. Tammany and Jefferson Parish. From 1999 to 2007, she served as the criminal justice director for Jefferson Parish and later served as the parish's director of code enforcement from 2008 to 2010. From 2010 to 2015, Villio was an associate at LeBlanc Butler in Metairie, Louisiana. Since 2015, she has been a partner at LeBlanc Fantaci Villio. Villio was elected to the Louisiana House of Representatives in November 2019 and assumed office on January 13, 2020. In February 2022, Villio was selected to serve on the Select Committee to Investigate Ronald Greene Incident.
