= Barbara West Carpenter =

American politician

Member of the Louisiana House of Representatives from the 63rd district
- Incumbent
- Assumed office 2015
- Preceded by: Dalton Honoré Sr.

Personal details
- Born: Baton Rouge, Louisiana, U.S.
- Party: Democratic
- Education: Southern University (BS, MEd); Kansas State University (PhD)

Barbara West Carpenter is a college official and state legislator in Louisiana. She works at Southern University. She is an alumna of Capitol High School in Baton Rouge and Southern University. She is a member of the Louisiana Legislative Black Caucus and the Louisiana Legislative Women's Caucus. A member of the Louisiana House of Representatives from the 63rd district, she has served since 2015.

== Education ==
Carpenter received a Bachelor of Science in vocational education and general science and a Master of Education in secondary education and administration from Southern University. She went on to earn her PhD in adult and occupational education and international education from Kansas State University.

== Career ==
Carpenter is the dean of international education and university outreach of Southern University.

In the Louisiana House of Representatives, Carpenter serves as chair of Labor and Industrial Relations Committee. She is a part of the Capital Region Legislative Delegation, the Democratic Caucus, the Louisiana Legislative Black Caucus, and the Louisiana Legislative Women's Caucus.
