= Beau Beaullieu =

American politician

Beau Beaullieau

Member of the Louisiana House of Representatives from the 48th district
- Incumbent
- Assumed office January 13, 2020
- Preceded by: Taylor Barras

Personal details
- Born: Gerald Beaullieu IV
- Party: Republican
- Children: 4
- Education: Louisiana State University (BS); University of Louisiana at Lafayette (MBA)

Gerald "Beau" Beaullieu IV is an American politician serving as a member of the Louisiana House of Representatives from the 48th district. Elected in November 2019, he assumed office on January 13, 2020.

== Education ==
Beaullieu earned a Bachelor of Science degree in finance from Louisiana State University in 1997 and a Master of Business Administration in finance from the University of Louisiana at Lafayette in 2001.

== Career ==
Outside of politics, Beaullieu works as a financial advisor. Since 2001, he has been a managing partner of the CoSource Financial Group. Beaullieu was elected to the Louisiana House of Representatives in November 2019 and assumed office on January 13, 2020. He served as vice chair of the House Retirement Committee until becoming vice chair of the House Ways and Means Committee.
