= Larry Bagley =

American politician (born 1949)

Lawrence A. "Larry" Bagley, Jr.

Louisiana State Representative for District 7 (Caddo, DeSoto, and Sabine parishes)
- Incumbent
- Assumed office January 2016
- Preceded by: Richard Burford

Personal details
- Born: January 4, 1949 (age 77) Longstreet, Louisiana, U.S.
- Party: Republican
- Children: 7, including two foster sons
- Parent(s): Lawrence and Sally Bagley
- Education: Baptist Christian College Stephen F. Austin State University Northwestern State University
- Occupation: Businessman; insurance agent retired educator

Lawrence A. Bagley Jr. (born January 4, 1949), known as Larry Bagley, is a Republican member of the Louisiana House of Representatives for District 7, which encompasses Caddo, DeSoto, and Sabine parishes in northwestern Louisiana. In January 2016, he succeeded outgoing Republican Representative Richard Burford, an unsuccessful candidate against the Conservative Democrat John Milkovich for the District 38 seat in the Louisiana State Senate in the general election held on November 21, 2015.

== Political life ==
In the primary election held on October 24, 2015, Bagley with 5,531 votes (52.8 percent) defeated two other Republicans, Robert S. "Steve" Casey, who received 2,775 votes (26.5 percent), and Perry D. McDaniel, who polled 2,170 votes (20.7 percent).

In 2016, Bagley joined a House bipartisan majority to enact a one-cent increase in the state sales tax.

=== Attempt to end automobile inspection stickers ===
In April 2017, Representative Bagley proposed legislation which would halt most automobile inspection stickers required annually since 1961 on all vehicles in Louisiana. Bagley's bill would limit inspections to student transportation and commercial vehicles and would not impact the parishes of Ascension, East Baton Rouge, Iberville, Livingston, and West Baton Rouge, which are required under the Clean Air Act of 1963 to conduct specialized inspections for vehicle emissions, Displayed on windshields, the stickers are considered proof that the inspections was conducted.

On May 15, 2017, the House Transportation Committee, citing skepticism for Bagley's legislation by the Louisiana State Police, tabled the bill. Bagley claimed that the legislation would end what he called a $6 million per year industry in fraudulent stickers. Representative Terry Landry, a former state police superintendent from Lafayette Parish, said that he thought ending inspections would be "sacrificing safety. I just fundamentally disagree with your bill."

As the issue played out, lobbyists representing those who perform the inspections also lined up against Bagley's proposal. These businesses make nearly half of their overall income from the inspections. Bagley favored adding the inspection fee to one's motor vehicle registration. However, the Louisiana Constitution of 1974 places a cap on the amount of that fee. Hence the proposed change would require a constitutional amendment to adjust the vehicle registration fee structure. Bagley vowed, assuming that he is reelected in 2019, to bring back the matter in the 2021 economic session of the legislature. Bagley said that he wants to hire 150 new state troopers with money that the state spends on the inspections.

Louisiana hence remains one of thirteen states with motor vehicle inspection laws.

Louisiana House of Representatives
Preceded by Richard Burford	Louisiana State Representative for District 7 (Caddo, DeSoto, and Sabine parishes); Lawrence A. "Larry" Bagley, Jr. 2016–	Succeeded by Incumbent
