= Phillip Tarver =

American politician

Member of the Louisiana House of Representatives from the 36th district
- Incumbent
- Assumed office January 13, 2020
- Preceded by: Mark Abraham

Personal details
- Party: Republican
- Education: McNeese State University (BS)

Phillip Eric Tarver is an American politician serving as a member of the Louisiana House of Representatives from the 36th district. A member of the Republican Party and Executive Officer of the Louisiana Freedom Caucus, Tarver has been in office since January 13, 2020.

== Career ==
Tarver is the owner of Lake Charles Toyota and a former member of the Calcasieu Parish School Board. Tarver was first elected to the Louisiana House of Representatives for District 36 in 2019, assuming office on January 13, 2020. He was re-elected after running unopposed on October 14, 2023.
