= Daryl Deshotel =

American politician and businessman

Daryl Deshontel

Member of the Louisiana House of Representatives from the 28th district
- Incumbent
- Assumed office January 13, 2020
- Preceded by: Robert Johnson

Personal details
- Born: Daryl Andrew Deshotel Avoyelles Parish, Louisiana, U.S.
- Party: Republican
- Children: 3
- Education: Louisiana State University (BS)

Daryl Andrew Deshotel is an American politician and businessman serving as a member of the Louisiana House of Representatives from the 28th district. Elected in November 2019, he assumed office on January 13, 2020.

== Early life and education ==
Deshotel was born in Avoyelles Parish and raised in Hessmer, Louisiana. After graduating from Bunkie High School, he earned a Bachelor of Science degree in construction management from Louisiana State University.

== Career ==
During college, Deshontel worked part-time for a computer company, where he became interested in computer programming and building. He co-founded his own computer company, Detel Wireless, in 1999. In 2002, Deshotel and his business partner founded Detel Computer Solutions. In 2014, he sold Detel Wireless to Conterra Ultra Broadband, a telecommunications company owned by Stichting Pensioenfonds ABP. Deshotel remained president of Detel Computer Solutions until 2018. In 2019, Deshotel was elected to the Louisiana House of Representatives. He assumed office in January 2020. In February 2022, Deshontel invested one million dollars into his campaign account, indicating that he may seek election to statewide office in 2023.
