= Wayne McMahen =

Louisiana politician

Member of the Louisiana House of Representatives from the tenth district
- Incumbent
- Assumed office August 1, 2018
- Preceded by: Gene Reynolds

Personal details
- Party: Republican
- Education: Louisiana Tech University (BS), Louisiana State University (DVM)
- Profession: Retired veterinarian

Wayne McMahen, is a Republican member of the Louisiana House of Representatives and represents District 10, covering parts of Bossier Parish and Webster Parish since 2018.

== Background ==
Wayne McMahen is a politician and retired veterinarian from Springhill, Louisiana. He became a Doctor of Veterinary Medicine at Louisiana State University. He took over his father's business, the McMahen Veterinary Hospital in Springhill, before being elected to the Louisiana House of Representatives in 2018 and retiring.

McMahen has been on the board of directors for several organizations, including Citizens National Bank and the Springhill Medical Center.

McMahen ran unopposed for the District 10 seat in 2018, after Gene Reynolds resigned.

In 2022 McMahen authored a bill to make resisting an officer a violent crime. The bill was passed and then vetoed by Governor John Bel Edwards.
