= Daryl Joy Walters =

American politician

Joy Walters

Member of the Louisiana House of Representatives from the 4th district
- Incumbent
- Assumed office January 8, 2024
- Preceded by: Cedric Glover

Personal details
- Party: Democratic
- Education: Wiley College (BA); Princeton Theological Seminary (MDIV); Emory University (THM)

Daryl Joy Walters is an American politician currently serving as a member of the Louisiana House of Representatives from the 4th district, representing Caddo Parish. She assumed office on January 8, 2024.

== Early life and education ==
Walters is a native of Shreveport, Louisiana. She holds a Bachelor of Arts degree in Religion and Philosophy from Wiley College, an M.Div. from Princeton Theological Seminary, and a Th.M. from Emory University. Additionally, she holds a specialized certificate from Yale University’s Women’s Campaign School.

== Career ==
Before her election, Walters worked as an aide for the Louisiana State Senate and also served as an aide to former U.S. Senator Mary Landrieu. In November 2023, she won the election for the 4th district seat in the Louisiana House of Representatives, defeating Jasmine Green with 54% of the vote.

In the Louisiana House, Walters serves on the Committee on Administration of Criminal Justice, Labor and Industrial Relations, and Transportation, Highways and Public Works committees. She is also a member of the Louisiana Democratic Caucus, the Louisiana Legislative Black Caucus, and the Louisiana Legislative Women's Caucus.

Walters has been involved in various legislative initiatives, including advocating for absentee voting rights for incarcerated voters and opposing measures that limit home study programs.

== Personal life ==
Walters is a member of Delta Sigma Theta, having been initiated in the Alpha Iota Chapter. She is also an active member of the Mount Canaan Missionary Baptist Church.

Louisiana House of Representatives
Preceded by Cedric Glover	Louisiana State Representative for District 4 (Caddo Parish); 2024–	Succeeded by Incumbent
