= Joseph A. Stagni =

Joe Stagni

Member of the Louisiana House of Representatives from the 92nd district
- In office April 10, 2017 – June 30, 2026
- Preceded by: Tom Willmott
- Succeeded by: Vacant

Personal details
- Born: Joseph Anthony Stagni
- Party: Republican
- Education: Nicholls State University (BS); Texas Chiropractic College (DC)

Joseph Anthony "Joe" Stagni is an American politician and chiropractor who served as a member of the Louisiana House of Representatives from the 92nd district. He assumed office on April 10, 2017.

== Early life and education ==
A native of Kenner, Louisiana, Stagni graduated from John Curtis Christian School. He earned a Bachelor of Science degree from Nicholls State University and a Doctor of Chiropractic from the Texas Chiropractic College.

== Career ==
Outside of politics, Stagni works as a chiropractor. He also served as a member of the Kenner City Council. Stagni was elected to the Louisiana House of Representatives in a 2017 special election. He also serves as vice chair of the House Municipal, Parochial and Cultural Affairs Committee. As a member of the House, Stagni voted to uphold Governor John Bel Edwards's veto of a bill that would prevent transgender athletes from competing on sports teams that match their gender identity. In February 2022, a recall petition was filed against Stagni with the secretary of state of Louisiana. Stagni resigned from the Louisiana House in June 2026.
