= Michael Echols =

American politician

Mike Echols
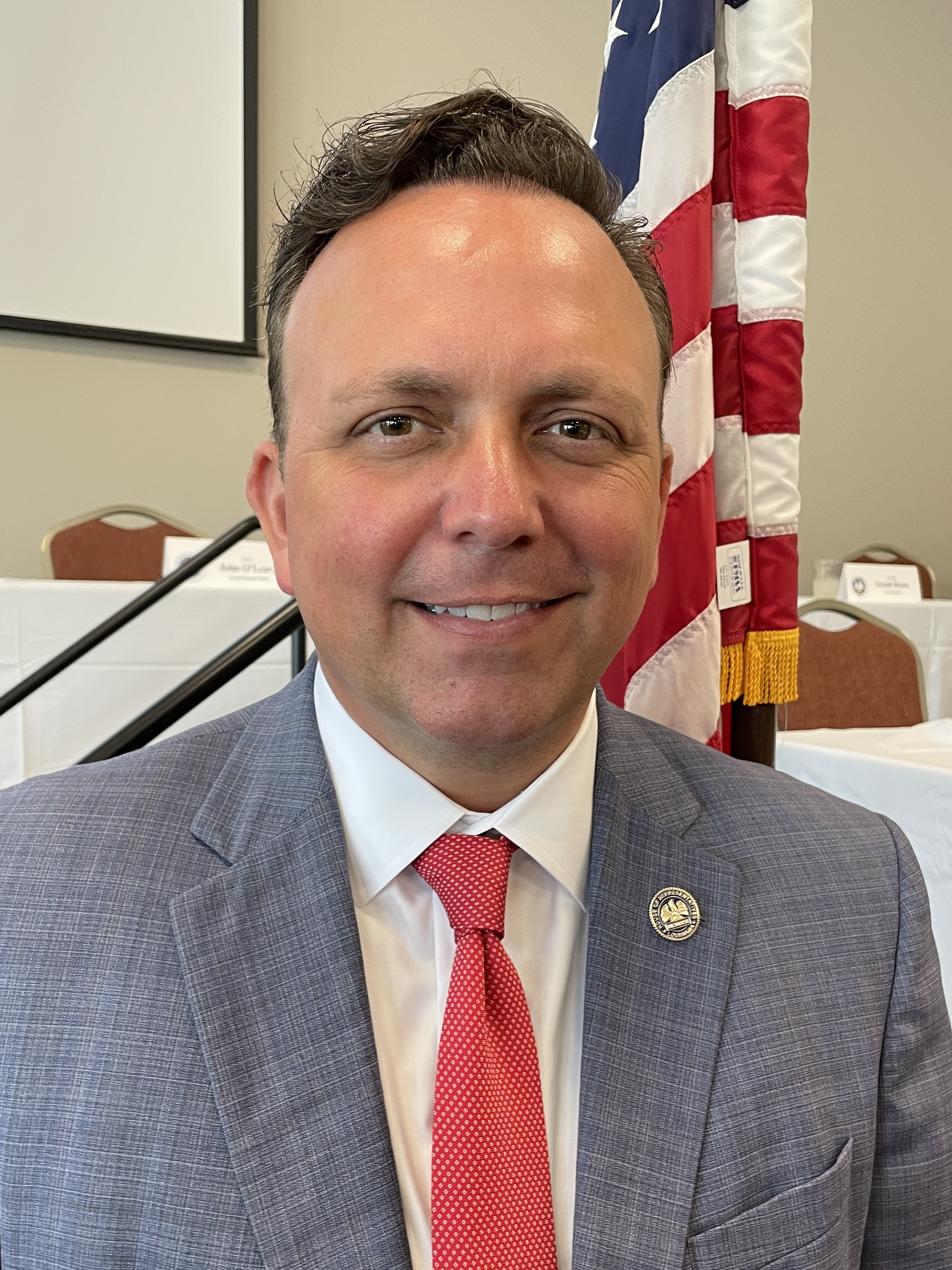
- Echols in 2026

Majority Leader of the Louisiana House of Representatives
- Incumbent
- Assumed office December 11, 2025
- Preceded by: Mark Wright

Member of the Louisiana House of Representatives from the 14th district
- Incumbent
- Assumed office January 13, 2020
- Preceded by: Jay Morris

Personal details
- Born: Michael Charles Echols; February 11, 1977 (age 49) Bastrop, Louisiana, U.S.
- Party: Republican
- Education: University of Louisiana, Monroe (BS, MBA)

Michael Charles Echols (born February 11, 1977) is an American politician from the state of Louisiana. A Republican, he represents the 14th district in the Louisiana House of Representatives.

== Early life and education ==
Echols was born in Bastrop, Louisiana, and lives in Monroe. He earned a Bachelor of Science in accounting and a Master of Business Administration in business from the University of Louisiana at Monroe. His professional background includes development, construction, healthcare, real estate and insurance.

== Political career ==
Echols served on the Monroe City Council from 2016 to 2020 and served as council chair. He was elected to the Louisiana House of Representatives in 2019 from the 14th district and was listed by the legislature as a member elected for the 2024–2028 term.

In the House, Echols represents part of Ouachita Parish. His committee assignments have included Health and Welfare, Labor and Industrial Relations, Ways and Means, the House Executive Committee, the Joint Medicaid Oversight Committee and the Joint Legislative Committee on Capital Outlay. He has also served as chair of the Louisiana Republican Legislative Delegation and as a member of the Louisiana Rural Caucus.

On December 11, 2025, the Louisiana House Republican Caucus elected Echols as majority leader of the caucus. KNOE-TV reported that the position is responsible for coordinating the Republican legislative agenda on the House floor.

=== Glenwood Regional Medical Center ===
In 2024, Echols and West Monroe Mayor Staci Albritton Mitchell testified before the United States Senate Committee on Health, Education, Labor and Pensions about Steward Health Care's management of Glenwood Regional Medical Center in West Monroe, Louisiana. In 2025, Echols authored House Bill 317, a bill related to accountability for hospital mismanagement after the Steward bankruptcy and the change in Glenwood's operator.

=== 2026 congressional campaign ===
On February 10, 2026, Echols announced his candidacy for Louisiana's 5th congressional district. After Louisiana lawmakers changed the congressional election schedule, the open primary was set for November 3.

Echols finished fourth in the primary with 14.4% of the vote in unofficial returns. Pat Moore and Gabe Firment advanced to the December 12 runoff.

Louisiana House of Representatives
Preceded by Mark Wright	Majority Leader of the Louisiana House of Representatives; 2025–present	Incumbent
