= Jack McFarland (politician) =

American politician

Member of the Louisiana House of Representatives from the 13th district
- Incumbent
- Assumed office January 2016
- Preceded by: James Fannin

Personal details
- Born: Jack Gideon McFarland; November 18, 1969 (age 56)
- Party: Republican
- Education: University of Arkansas, Monticello (BS)

Jack Gideon McFarland (born November 18, 1969) is a Republican member of the Louisiana House of Representatives for District 13, which encompasses Bienville, Jackson, Ouachita, and Winn parishes in north Louisiana. On January 11, 2016, McFarland succeeded outgoing Republican Representative James R. Fannin, who was elected to the District 35 seat in the Louisiana State Senate in the nonpartisan blanket primary held on October 24, 2015.

In that same primary, McFarland, with 7,719 votes (60.3 percent), defeated his Democratic opponent, Philip Lawrence, who polled 5,091 votes (39.7 percent).
