= Charles Owen (politician) =

American politician

Charles Anthony Owen

Member of the Louisiana House of Representatives from the 30th district
- Incumbent
- Assumed office January 13, 2020
- Preceded by: James Armes

Personal details
- Party: Republican
- Education: B.S., Louisiana Tech University (1984, cum laude); M.S., Business Administration, Louisiana Tech University (1986); Ph.D., Louisiana State University (2011)
- Occupation: Consultant, Adjunct Faculty Member, Retired Military Officer

Charles Anthony Owen is a member of the Louisiana House of Representatives, representing District 30 since January 13, 2020. His current term ends on January 10, 2028. In the Louisiana House of Representatives elections, 2023, Charles Owen won re-election with 85.2% of the vote in the primary on October 14, 2023.
