= Robby Carter =

American politician (born 1960)

Member of the Louisiana House of Representatives from the 72nd district
- Incumbent
- Assumed office January 11, 2016
- Preceded by: John Bel Edwards
- In office September 1, 1996 – January 14, 2008
- Preceded by: Buster Guzzardo
- Succeeded by: John Bel Edwards

Personal details
- Born: Robert J. Carter; October 20, 1960 (age 65) Greensburg, Louisiana, U.S.
- Party: Democratic

Robby Carter (born October 20, 1960) is an American politician who has served in the Louisiana House of Representatives from the 72nd district since 2016. He previously served in the Louisiana House of Representatives from 1996 to 2008.
