= Stuart Bishop =

American politician (born 1975)

Member of the Louisiana House of Representatives from the 43rd district
- Incumbent
- Assumed office January 9, 2012

Personal details
- Born: Stuart James Bishop; August 19, 1975 (age 51)
- Party: Republican
- Children: 4
- Education: Louisiana State University (BA)

Stuart James Bishop (born August 19, 1975) is an American politician serving as a member of the Louisiana House of Representatives for the 43rd district. He assumed office on January 9, 2012.

== Education ==
After graduating from Hanson Memorial High School in Franklin, Louisiana, Bishop earned a Bachelor of Arts degree from Louisiana State University.

== Career ==
From 1995 to 1997, Bishop worked as an aid in the Louisiana State Senate. He is the co-owner and sales manager of Baldwin Redi-Mix, a construction manager. Bishop was elected to the Louisiana House of Representatives in 2012. During the 2017 legislative session, he served as vice chair of the House Natural Resources and Environment Committee. In the 2019–2020 legislative session, he served as chair of the same committee. In the 2021–2022 legislative session, he serves as chair of the Joint Capital Outlay Committee and House Ways and Means Committee. Bishop was mentioned as a possible candidate for speaker of the House in 2016. Along with 12 others, Bishop co-founded the Louisiana Legislative Conservative Coalition.
