= Nicholas Muscarello =

Louisiana politician

Member of the Louisiana House of Representatives from the 86th district
- Incumbent
- Assumed office April 3, 2018

Personal details
- Born: Nicholas Muscarello Jr.
- Party: Republican
- Education: Southeastern Louisiana University (BA); Southern University Law Center (JD)
- Profession: Politician, attorney

Nicholas Muscarello Jr. (Republican Party) is a member of the Louisiana House of Representatives for District 86. He first entered office in 2018.

Muscarello voted for and supports an extreme draft Louisiana state bill that would make in vitro fertilization (IVF) treatments and some forms of birth control a crime, and prosecute women who get abortions for murder. The draft bill intentionally has no exceptions for rape, incest, or the protection of the life of the mother and would likely also criminalize miscarriages.
