= Lance Harris =

American politician (born 1961)

Member of the Louisiana Board of Elementary and Secondary Education from the 5th district
- Incumbent
- Assumed office January 8, 2024
- Governor: Jeff Landry
- Preceded by: Ashley Ellis

Majority Leader of the Louisiana House of Representatives
- In office January 3, 2013 – January 12, 2020
- Preceded by: Tony Ligi
- Succeeded by: Blake Miguez

Member of the Louisiana House of Representatives from the 25th district
- In office January 9, 2012 – January 8, 2024
- Preceded by: Chris Roy
- Succeeded by: Jason DeWitt

Personal details
- Born: John Lance Harris; June 11, 1961 (age 65) Pineville, Louisiana, U.S.
- Party: Republican
- Spouse: Leetha Harris
- Education: Louisiana College (attended); Northwestern State University, Natchitoches (attended)

John Lance Harris (born June 11, 1961) is an American businessman and politician from Alexandria, Louisiana. He was a Republican member of the Louisiana House of Representatives for District 25 in Rapides Parish. In 2020, Harris ran for Congress in Louisiana's 5th congressional district. He was defeated by fellow Republican Luke Letlow in the runoff election.

== Background ==
Harris attended Louisiana College in his native Pineville and Northwestern State University in Natchitoches, Louisiana. Harris owns the Leebo's chain of convenience stores.

In the nonpartisan blanket primary held on October 22, 2011, Harris defeated his only opponent, fellow Republican Barett Byrd, a retired colonel in the United States Marine Corps from Woodworth. Harris succeeded Democratic Representative Chris Roy, Jr., of Alexandria, effective January 2012. Harris defeated Byrd, 7,577 votes (55.5 percent) to 6,088 (44.6 percent) to claim the position. Harris was elected chairman of the Louisiana Republican legislative delegation in December 2012. In 2020, he was succeeded by Rep. Blake Miguez as chairman.

At the beginning of his third term in 2020, Harris was named Chairman of the House Retirement Committee and additionally serves on the Appropriations Committee, the Joint Legislative Committee on the Budget, and the House Select Leadership Committee. He is a member of the Louisiana Republican Legislative Delegation and the Louisiana Rural Caucus.

== Legislative record ==
In 2013, Harris endorsed Governor Bobby Jindal's decision to withdraw a plan to increase sales taxes while at the same time repealing the state income tax. Jindal dropped the plan after opposition surfaced in public opinion polls and among legislators. "While repeal is off the table for this legislative session, we will continue to work on the issue so that we can craft a responsible way to achieve our objectives in reforming the tax code in the future," Harris said.

In May 2016, he wrote an amendment to Louisiana's hate crime statue, adding protections for police officers and firefighters who are targeted based on their profession. The amendment was signed into law by Governor John Bel Edwards.

Louisiana House of Representatives
Preceded by Tony Ligi	Majority Leader of the Louisiana House of Representatives; 2013–2020	Succeeded by Blake Miguez
