= Gabe Firment =

American politician and businessman

Member of the Louisiana House of Representatives from the 22nd district
- Incumbent
- Assumed office January 13, 2020
- Preceded by: Terry Brown

Personal details
- Born: Michael Gabriel Firment; 1970 or 1971 (age 55–56)
- Party: Republican
- Spouse: Erica Miller
- Children: 2
- Education: Louisiana Christian University (BS); Louisiana Tech University (MBA)
- Website: Campaign website

Michael Gabriel Firment (born 1970/1971) is an American politician and businessman serving as a member of the Louisiana House of Representatives from the 22nd district. He assumed office on January 13, 2020.

Firment is running for Louisiana's 5th congressional district and will face Pat Moore in the December 2026 runoff election.

== Education ==
After graduating from Tioga High School in 1989, Firment earned a Bachelor of Science degree in public administration from Louisiana College in 1994 and a Master of Business Administration from Louisiana Tech University.

== Career ==
Outside of politics, Firment has worked in the construction and insurance industries. He was elected to the Louisiana House of Representatives in November 2019 and assumed office on January 13, 2020.
