= Louisiana House of Representatives =

Lower house of the legislature of the U.S. state of Louisiana

Louisiana House of Representatives Chambre des Représentants de Louisiane Cámara de Representantes de Luisiana
- Louisiana State Legislature

Type
- Type: Lower house
- Term limits: 3 Terms (12 years)

History
- New session started: January 8, 2024

Leadership
- Speaker: Phillip DeVillier (R) since January 8, 2024
- Speaker pro tempore: Michael T. Johnson (R) since January 8, 2024
- Majority Leader: Michael Echols (R) since December 11, 2025
- Minority Leader: Kyle Green (D) since October 29, 2025

Structure
- Seats: 105
- Political groups: Majority: Republican (70); Minority: Democratic (32); Vacant: Vacant (3)
- Length of term: 4 years
- Authority: Article III, Section 3, Louisiana Constitution
- Salary: $16,800/year plus per diem.

Elections
- Last election: October 14 and November 18, 2023
- Next election: October 16 and November 20, 2027
- Redistricting: Legislative control

Meeting place
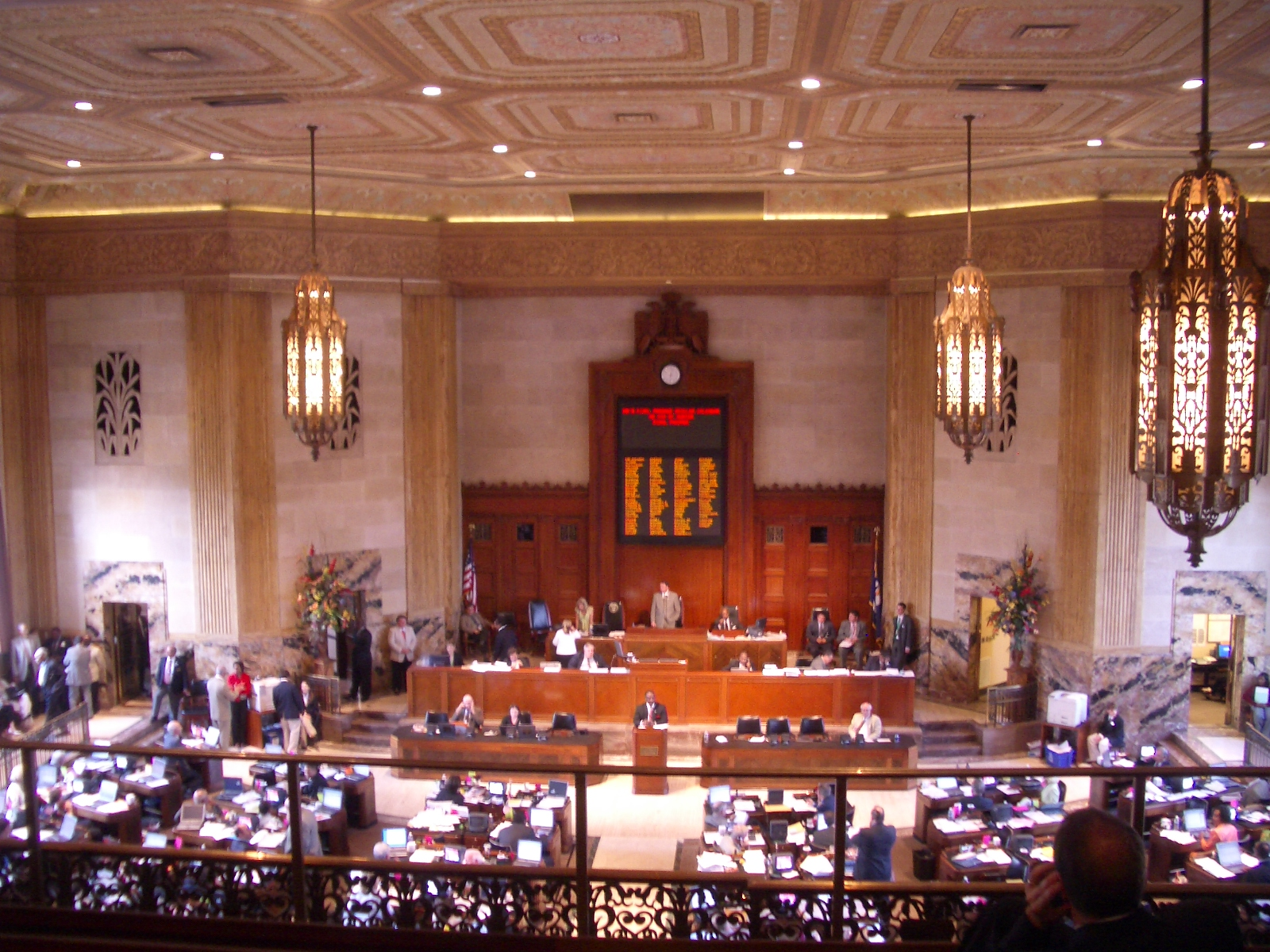
- House of Representatives Chamber; Louisiana State Capitol; Baton Rouge, Louisiana

Website
- Louisiana House of Representatives

The Louisiana House of Representatives (French: Chambre des Représentants de Louisiane; Spanish: Cámara de Representantes de Luisiana) is the lower house in the Louisiana State Legislature, the state legislature of the U.S. state of Louisiana. This chamber is composed of 105 representatives, each of whom represents approximately 42,500 people (2000 figures). Members serve four-year terms with a term limit of three terms (twelve years). The House is one of the five state legislative lower houses that has a four-year term, as opposed to the near-universal two-year term.

The House convenes at the State Capitol in Baton Rouge.

== Leadership ==
The Speaker of the House presides over the House of Representatives. The speaker is customarily recommended by the governor (although this is not in House rules), then elected by the full House. In addition to presiding over the body, the speaker is also the chief leadership position, and controls the flow of legislation and committee assignments. The Louisiana House of Representatives also elects a speaker pro tempore to preside in the absence of the Speaker.

The current speaker is Republican Phillip DeVillier. His deputy is the speaker pro tempore, currently Republican Michael T. Johnson. The speaker pro tempore presides when the Speaker is not present.

== Composition ==
The Louisiana House of Representatives comprises 105 representatives elected from across the state from single-member districts by registered voters in the district. Representatives must be electors, be at least eighteen years old, be domiciled in the district they represent at least one year, and have resided in the state two years. It is the judge of its members' qualifications and elections. All candidates for state representative in a district compete in a nonpartisan blanket primary; if no candidate earns 50+1 percent of the vote, the top two vote-getters advance into the general election. Elections occur every four years and representatives are limited to three four-year terms (12 years). If a seat is vacant, it will be filled in a special election. Its sessions occur along with the Louisiana State Senate, every year, for sixty legislative days in even-numbered years and forty-five legislative days in odd-numbered years in which only monetary bills can be considered. It is the lower legislative chamber of the Louisiana State Legislature; the upper house is the Louisiana State Senate. The Louisiana House has sole authority to impeach state officials and introduce appropriation bills. The Louisiana House of Representatives was established, along with its functions and authority, in Article III, Section 3 of the Louisiana Constitution.

=== Party membership ===
Affiliation	Party (Shading indicates majority caucus)			Total	Vacant
Affiliation	Republican	Democratic	Independent	Total	Vacant
End of legislature 2011	57	46	2	105	0
Begin 2012	58	45	2	105	0
End of legislature 2015	59	44	2	105	0
Begin 2016	61	42	2	105	0
End of legislature 2019	60	39	5	104	1
Begin 2020	68	35	2	105	0
End of legislature 2023	71	33	0	104	1
Begin 2024	73	32	0	105	0
March 11, 2025 (Note: Republican Brach Myers (District 45) and Democrat Larry Selders (District 67) resigned to join the State Senate)	72	31	0	103	2
April 14, 2025 (Note: Republican Annie Spell was sworn in to succeed Myers)	73	31	0	104	1
May 19, 2025 (Note: Democrat Terry Landry Jr. was sworn in to succeed Selders)	73	32	0	105	0
November 18, 2025 (Note: Democrat Chad Brown (District 60) resigned after being appointed as commissioner of the Louisiana Office of Alcohol and Tobacco Control.)	73	31	0	104	1
December 14, 2025 (Note: Republican Troy Romero (District 37) resigned.) (Note: Democrat Jason Hughes (District 100) resigned after being elected to the New Orleans City Council.)	72	30	0	102	3
January 9, 2026 (Note: Republican Paula Davis (District 69) resigned.)	71	30	0	101	4
January 12, 2026 (Note: Democrat Matthew Willard (District 97) resigned after being elected to the New Orleans City Council.)	71	29	0	100	5
February 7, 2026 (Note: Republican Reese Broussard and Democrats Chasity Martinez and Ed Murray elected to succeed Romero, Brown and Willard, respectively.)	72	31	0	103	2
February 11, 2026 (Note: Republican Julie Emerson (District 39) resigned after being appointed as chief of staff to governor Jeff Landry.)	71	31	0	102	3
February 27, 2026 (Note: Republican Doyle Boudreaux elected unopposed to succeed Emerson.)	72	31	0	103	2
March 14, 2026 (Note: Republican Paul Sawyer and Democrat Dana Henry elected to succeed Davis and Hughes, respectively.)	73	32	0	105	0
June 30, 2026 (Note: Republican Joseph A. Stagni (District 92) resigned.)	72	32	0	104	1
September 2026 (Note: Republican Mark Wright (District 77) resigned.)	71	32	0	103	2
November 12, 2026 (Note: Republican Michael Bayham (District 103) died.)	70	32	0	102	3
Latest voting share	68.6%	31.4%			

=== Members ===
District	Name	Party	Parishes represented	Residence	First elected	Eligible for reelection
1	Danny McCormick	Rep	Caddo	Oil City	2019	Yes
2	Steven Jackson	Dem	Bossier and Caddo	Shreveport	2023	Yes
3	Tammy Phelps	Dem	Caddo	Shreveport	2019	Yes
4	Daryl Joy Walters	Dem	Caddo	Shreveport	2023	Yes
5	Dennis Bamburg Jr.	Rep	Bossier, Caddo and Red River	Bossier City	2023	Yes
6	Michael Melerine	Rep	Bossier and Caddo	Shreveport	2023	Yes
7	Larry Bagley	Rep	Caddo, DeSoto, and Sabine	Stonewall	2015	No
8	Raymond J. Crews	Rep	Bossier	Bossier City	2017	No
9	Dodie Horton	Rep	Bossier	Haughton	2015	No
10	Wayne McMahen	Rep	Webster and Bossier	Minden	2018	Yes
11	Rashid Armand Young	Dem	Bienville, Claiborne, and Lincoln	Homer	2023	Yes
12	Christopher Turner	Rep	Lincoln and Union	Ruston	2019	Yes
13	Jack McFarland	Rep	Bienville, Jackson, Natchitoches and Winn	Jonesboro	2015	No
14	Michael Charles Echols	Rep	Ouachita	Monroe	2019	Yes
15	Foy Bryan Gadberry	Rep	Ouachita	Monroe	2019	Yes
16	Adrian Fisher	Dem	Morehouse and Ouachita parishes	Monroe	2021	Yes
17	Pat Moore	Dem	Ouachita	Monroe	2019	Yes
18	Jeremy LaCombe	Rep	Iberville, Pointe Coupee, West Baton Rouge, and West Feliciana	Livonia	2019	Yes
19	Francis C. Thompson	Rep	East Carroll, Madison, Morehouse, Richland, and West Carroll	Delhi	2019	Yes
20	Neil Riser	Rep	Caldwell, Catahoula, Franklin, LaSalle, and Ouachita	Columbia	2019	Yes
21	C. Travis Johnson	Dem	Catahoula, Concordia, East Carroll, Franklin, Madison, and Tensas	Vidalia	2019	Yes
22	Gabe Firment	Rep	Grant, LaSalle and Natchitoches	Pollock	2019	Yes
23	Shaun Mena	Dem	Orleans	New Orleans	2023	Yes
24	Rodney Schamerhorn	Rep	Beauregard, Sabine, and Vernon	Hornbeck	2019	Yes
25	Jason Brian DeWitt	Rep	Natchitoches and Rapides	Tioga	2023	Yes
26	Ed Larvadain III	Dem	Rapides	Alexandria	2019	Yes
27	Michael T. Johnson	Rep	Rapides	Pineville	2019	Yes
28	Daryl Deshotel	Rep	Avoyelles and St. Landry	Marksville	2019	Yes
29	Edmond Jordan	Dem	East Baton Rouge and West Baton Rouge	Baton Rouge	2016	No
30	Charles Owen	Rep	Beauregard and Vernon	Rosepine	2019	Yes
31	Troy Hebert	Rep	Lafayette and Vermilion	Lafayette	2023	Yes
32	R. Dewith Carrier	Rep	Allen, Beauregard, Calcasieu and Jefferson Davis	Oakdale	2019	Yes
33	Les Farnum	Rep	Calcasieu	Sulphur	2019	Yes
34	Wilford Carter Sr.	Dem	Calcasieu	Lake Charles	2019	Yes
35	Brett F. Geymann	Rep	Beauregard and Calcasieu	Lake Charles	2021	Yes
36	Phillip Eric Tarver	Rep	Calcasieu	Lake Charles	2019	Yes
37	Reese Broussard	Rep	Calcasieu and Jefferson Davis	Jennings	2026	Yes
38	Rhonda Gaye Butler	Rep	Evangeline and Rapides	Ville Platte	2019	Yes
39	Doyle Boudreaux	Rep	Lafayette	Scott	2026	Yes
40	Dustin Miller	Dem	St. Landry	Opelousas	2015	No
41	Phillip DeVillier	Rep	Acadia, Evangeline, and St. Landry	Eunice	2015	No
42	Chance Keith Henry	Rep	Acadia and Lafayette	Crowley	2023	Yes
43	Josh Carlson	Rep	Lafayette	Lafayette	2023	Yes
44	Tehmi Jahi Chassion	Dem	Lafayette	Lafayette	2023	Yes
45	Annie Spell	Rep	Lafayette	Lafayette	2025	Yes
46	Chad Michael Boyer	Rep	St. Landry, and St. Martin	Breaux Bridge	2023	Yes
47	Ryan Bourriaque	Rep	Calcasieu, Cameron, and Vermilion	Abbeville	2019	Yes
48	Beau Beaullieu	Rep	Iberia, Lafayette, and St. Martin	New Iberia	2019	Yes
49	Jacob Jules Gabriel Landry	Rep	Iberia, Lafayette and Vermillion	Erath	2023	Yes
50	Vincent "Vinney" St. Blanc III	Rep	St. Martin and St. Mary	Franklin	2019	Yes
51	Beryl Amedee	Rep	Assumption, Lafourche, St. Mary, and Terrebonne	Houma	2015	No
52	Jerome Zeringue	Rep	Terrebonne	Houma	2015	No
53	Jessica Domangue	Rep	Terrebonne	Houma	2023	Yes
54	Joseph A. Orgeron	Rep	Jefferson and Lafourche	Cut Off	2020	Yes
55	Bryan Fontenot	Rep	Lafourche	Thibodeaux	2019	Yes
56	Beth Anne Billings	Rep	St. Charles and St. John the Baptist	Destrehan	2023	Yes
57	Sylvia Elaine Taylor	Dem	St. Charles and St. John the Baptist	Laplace	2023	Yes
58	Ken Brass	Dem	Ascension, St. James and St. John	Vacherie	2017	No
59	Tony Bacala	Rep	Ascension	Prairieville	2015	No
60	Chasity Martinez	Dem	Assumption and Iberville	Plaquemine	2026	Yes
61	C. Denise Marcelle	Dem	East Baton Rouge	Baton Rouge	2015	No
62	Roy Daryl Adams	Dem	East Baton Rouge and East Feliciana	Jackson	2019	Yes
63	Barbara Carpenter	Dem	East Baton Rouge	Baton Rouge	2015	No
64	Kellee Hennessy Dickerson	Rep	East Baton Rouge and Livingston	Denham Springs	2023	Yes
65	Lauren Ventrella	Rep	East Baton Rouge	Greenwell Springs	2023	Yes
66	Emily Chenevert	Rep	East Baton Rouge	Baton Rouge	2023	Yes
67	Terry Landry	Dem	East Baton Rouge	Baton Rouge	2025	Yes
68	Dixon McMakin	Rep	East Baton Rouge	Baton Rouge	2023	Yes
69	Paul Sawyer	Rep	East Baton Rouge	Baton Rouge	2026	Yes
70	Barbara Reich Freiberg	Rep	East Baton Rouge	Baton Rouge	2019	Yes
71	Roger William Wilder, III	Rep	Livingston	Denham Springs	2023	Yes
72	Robby Carter	Dem	St. Helena, and Tangipahoa	Greensburg	2015	No
73	Kimberly Coates	Rep	Tangipahoa	Ponchatoula	2023	Yes
74	Peter F. Egan, Sr.	Rep	St. Tammany	Covington	2023	Yes
75	John Wyble	Rep	Washington	Franklinton	2023	Yes
76	Stephanie Berault	Rep	St. Tammany	Slidell	2023	Yes
77	Vacant		St. Tammany			
78	John R. Illg Jr.	Rep	Jefferson	Harahan	2019	Yes
79	Debbie Villio	Rep	Jefferson	Kenner	2019	Yes
80	Polly Thomas	Rep	Jefferson	Metairie	2016	No
81	Jeffrey Wiley	Rep	Ascension, Livingston and St. James	Maurepas	2023	Yes
82	Laurie Schlegel	Rep	Jefferson	Metairie	2021	Yes
83	Kyle M. Green Jr.	Dem	Jefferson	Marrero	2019	Yes
84	Timothy P. Kerner Sr	Rep	Jefferson	Lafitte	2019	Yes
85	Vincent Cox III	Rep	Jefferson	Gretna	2023	Yes
86	Nicholas Muscarello	Rep	Tangipahoa	Hammond	2018	Yes
87	Rodney Lyons	Dem	Jefferson	Marrero	2015	No
88	Kathy Edmonston	Rep	Ascension	Gonzalez	2019	Yes
89	Christopher Kim Carver	Rep	St. Tammany	Mandeville	2023	Yes
90	Brian Glorioso	Rep	St. Tammany	Slidell	2023	Yes
91	Mandie Landry	Dem	Orleans	New Orleans	2019	Yes
92	Vacant		Jefferson and St. Charles			
93	Alonzo Knox	Dem	Orleans	New Orleans	2023	Yes
94	Stephanie Hilferty	Rep	Jefferson and Orleans	Metairie	2015	No
95	Shane Mack	Rep	Livingston and Tangipahoa	Livingston	2023	Yes
96	Marcus Anthony Bryant	Dem	Iberia, Lafayette, and St. Martin	New Iberia	2019	Yes
97	Ed Murray	Dem	Orleans	New Orleans	2026	Yes
98	Aimee Adatto Freeman	Dem	Orleans	New Orleans	2019	Yes
99	Candace N. Newell	Dem	Orleans	New Orleans	2019	Yes
100	Dana Henry	Dem	Orleans	New Orleans	2026	Yes
101	Vanessa Caston LaFleur	Dem	East Baton Rouge	Baton Rouge	2022	Yes
102	Delisha Boyd	Dem	Orleans	New Orleans	2021	Yes
103	Vacant		St. Bernard			
104	Jack Galle	Rep	St. Tammany	Mandeville	2023	Yes
105	Jacob Braud	Rep	Jefferson, Orleans, and Plaquemines	Belle Chasse	2023	Yes

== Committee assignments ==
The committees of the Louisiana House review proposed bills and either kill them or recommend their passage to the full house. Each committee has a specialized area it oversees. Committees can call upon state officials to testify at committee meetings. Committee memberships, including chairmanships and vice chairmanships, are assigned by the Speaker.

Name	Chairman	Vice Chair
Administration of Criminal Justice	Vacant	Tony Bacala
Agriculture, Forestry, Aquaculture, & Rural Development	Jack McFarland	Dustin Miller
Appropriations	Jerome Zeringue	Francis C. Thompson
Civil Law and Procedure	Gregory A. Miller	Mike Johnson
Commerce	Paula Davis	Stephanie Hilferty
Education	Lance Harris	Patrick O. Jefferson
Health & Welfare	Larry Bagley	Christopher Turner
House & Governmental Affairs	John M. Stefanski	Royce Duplessis
Insurance	Mike Huval	Edmond Jordan
Judiciary	Randal L. Gaines	Sherman Q. Mack
Labor & Industrial Relations	Barbara Carpenter	Neil Riser
Municipal, Parochial, & Cultural Affairs	Rick Edmonds	Joseph A. Stagni
Natural Resources & Environment	Jean-Paul Coussan	Ryan Bourrique
Retirement	Phillip DeVillier	John R. Illg Jr.
Transportation, Highways, & Public Works	Mark Wright	Ken Brass
Ways and Means	Stuart J. Bishop	Gerald "Beau" Beaullieu IV

== See also ==
- List of speakers of the Louisiana House of Representatives
- Louisiana State Capitol
- Louisiana State Legislature
- Louisiana Senate
