= 2011 Louisiana House of Representatives election =

- October 22, 2011

All 105 seats in the Louisiana House of Representatives 53 seats needed for a majority
	Majority party	Minority party
Party	Republican	Democratic
- Results: Republican hold Republican gain Democratic hold Democratic gain
Speaker before election
Republican
Elected Speaker
Republican

The 2011 Louisiana House of Representatives election was held on October 22, 2011, with runoff elections held on November 19, 2011. All 105 seats in the Louisiana House of Representatives were up for election to four-year terms. It was held concurrently with elections for all statewide offices and the Louisiana State Senate.

== Overview ==
↓
58	2	45
Republican	(Note: There were two Independents.)	Democratic

== Retirements ==
Thirty incumbents did not seek re-election.

=== Democrats ===
1. District 10: Jean M. Doerge was term-limited.
2. District 11: Rick Gallot was term-limited (successfully ran for State Senate)
3. District 17: Rosalind Jones retired.
4. District 25: Chris Roy Jr. retired.
5. District 39: Bobby Badon retired.
6. District 53: Damon Baldone was term-limited.
7. District 56: Gary Smith Jr. was term-limited (successfully ran for State Senate).
8. District 58: Elton Aubert retired to run for State Senate.
9. District 61: Michael Jackson was term-limited (ran for State Senate).
10. District 95: Walker Hines retired to run for Secretary of State.
11. District 96: Juan LaFonta retired.
12. District 99: Charmaine Stiaes retired.
13. District 101: Wesley T. Bishop was redistricted and ran in District 99.
14. District 103: Reed Henderson retired.

=== Republicans ===
1. District 8: Jane H. Smith was term-limited.
2. District 12: Hollis Downs retired.
3. District 16: Kay Katz was term-limited.
4. District 20: Noble Ellington retired.
5. District 43: Page Cortez retired to successfully run for State Senate.
6. District 57: Nickie Monica retired.
7. District 62: Thomas McVea was term-limited.
8. District 64: Bodi White retired to successfully run for State Senate.
9. District 81: John LaBruzzo was redistricted and ran in District 94.
10. District 85: Ricky Templet retired to successfully run for Jefferson Parish Council.
11. District 86: Jim Tucker retired to run for Secretary of State.
12. District 88: M. J. Smiley retired to successfully run for Ascension Parish Assessor.
13. District 104: Nita Hutter was term-limited (ran for State Senate).

=== Independents ===
1. District 105: Ernest Wooton was term-limited.

== Incumbents defeated ==
=== In primary election ===
One incumbent representative, a Republican, was defeated in the October 22nd jungle primary.

==== Republicans ====
1. District 94: John LaBruzzo lost a redistricting race to Nicholas Lorusso.

== Results ==
=== District 1 ===
2011 Louisiana's 1st State House district election
Primary election
Party	Candidate	Votes	%
Republican	James Morris		100
Total votes			100

=== District 2 ===
2011 Louisiana's 2nd State House district election
Primary election
Party	Candidate	Votes	%
Democratic	Roy A. Burrell		100
Total votes			100

=== District 3 ===
2011 Louisiana's 3rd State House district election
Primary election
Party	Candidate	Votes	%
Democratic	Barbara Norton	3,078	44.71
Democratic	Lynn Cawthorne	1,850	26.87
Democratic	Ernest Baylor Jr.	1,548	22.49
Republican	Anna Marie Arpino	408	5.93
Total votes		6,884	100
Democratic	Barbara Norton	3,240	56.12
Democratic	Lynn Cawthorne	2,533	43.88
Total votes		5,773	100

=== District 4 ===
2011 Louisiana's 4th State House district election
Primary election
Party	Candidate	Votes	%
Democratic	Patrick Williams		100
Total votes			100

=== District 5 ===
2011 Louisiana's 5th State House district election
Primary election
Party	Candidate	Votes	%
Republican	Alan Seabaugh	6,031	79.26
Republican	Cynthia Norton Robertson	1,578	20.74
Total votes		7,609	100

=== District 6 ===
2011 Louisiana's 6th State House district election
Primary election
Party	Candidate	Votes	%
Republican	Thomas G. Carmody		100
Total votes			100

=== District 7 ===
2011 Louisiana's 7th State House district election
Primary election
Party	Candidate	Votes	%
Republican	Richard Burford	6,652	68.91
Democratic	Cynthia Williams	3,001	31.09
Total votes		9,653	100

=== District 8 ===
2011 Louisiana's 8th State House district election
Primary election
Party	Candidate	Votes	%
Republican	Jeff R. Thompson	4,991	56.75
Republican	Duke Lowrie	3,803	43.25
Total votes		8,794	100

=== District 9 ===
2011 Louisiana's 9th State House district election
Primary election
Party	Candidate	Votes	%
Republican	Henry Lee Burns		100
Total votes			100

=== District 10 ===
2011 Louisiana's 10th State House district election
Primary election
Party	Candidate	Votes	%
Democratic	Gene Reynolds	3,725	38.97
Republican	Jerri Ray de Pingre	2,498	26.13
Republican	Gerald Holland	2,131	22.29
Republican	Ronnie Broughton	1,205	12.61
Total votes		9,559	100
Democratic	Gene Reynolds	4,232	54.68
Republican	Jerri Ray de Pingre	3,508	45.32
Total votes		7,740	100

=== District 11 ===
2011 Louisiana's 11th State House district election
Primary election
Party	Candidate	Votes	%
Democratic	Patrick O. Jefferson	4,999	62.18
Democratic	Rory Bedford	3,041	37.82
Total votes		8,040	100

=== District 12 ===
2011 Louisiana's 12th State House district election
Primary election
Party	Candidate	Votes	%
Republican	Jason Bullock	5,410	45.26
Republican	Rob Shadoin	4,646	38.87
Republican	Jacob Halley	1,898	15.88
Total votes		11,954	100
Republican	Rob Shadoin	4,186	54.37
Republican	Jason Bullock	3,513	45.63
Total votes		7,699	100

=== District 13 ===
2011 Louisiana's 13th State House district election
Primary election
Party	Candidate	Votes	%
Democratic	James Fannin		100
Total votes			100

=== District 14 ===
2011 Louisiana's 14th State House district election
Primary election
Party	Candidate	Votes	%
Republican	Jay Morris	5,078	42.55
Republican	Sam Little	4,384	36.74
Republican	Michael Echols	2,471	20.71
Total votes		11,933	100
Republican	Jay Morris	5,005	59.10
Republican	Sam Little	3,463	40.90
Total votes		8,468	100

=== District 15 ===
2011 Louisiana's 15th State House district election
Primary election
Party	Candidate	Votes	%
Republican	Frank Hoffman	8,953	80.99
Democratic	Wayne Trichel	2,102	19.01
Total votes		11,055	100

=== District 16 ===
2011 Louisiana's 16th State House district election
Primary election
Party	Candidate	Votes	%
Democratic	Katrina Jackson	3,283	51.01
Republican	Samuel Jackson	1,650	25.64
Democratic	Ronnie Traylor	1,021	15.86
Independent	James M. Murphy	482	7.49
Total votes		6,436	100

=== District 17 ===
2011 Louisiana's 17th State House district election
Primary election
Party	Candidate	Votes	%
Democratic	Billye Burns	2,290	36.98
Democratic	Marcus Hunter	1,909	30.83
Democratic	Brenda Shelling	1,253	20.24
Democratic	Otis Chisley	740	11.95
Total votes		6,192	100
Democratic	Marcus Hunter	1,984	50.05
Democratic	Billye Burns	1,981	49.95
Total votes		3,964	100

=== District 18 ===
2011 Louisiana's 18th State House district election
Primary election
Party	Candidate	Votes	%
Democratic	Major Thibaut		100
Total votes			100

=== District 19 ===
2011 Louisiana's 19th State House district election
Primary election
Party	Candidate	Votes	%
Republican	Charles "Bubba" Chaney		100
Total votes			100

=== District 20 ===
2011 Louisiana's 20th State House district election
Primary election
Party	Candidate	Votes	%
Republican	Steven Pylant	9,119	56.34
Democratic	Cleve Womack	7,066	43.66
Total votes		16,185	100

=== District 21 ===
2011 Louisiana's 21st State House district election
Primary election
Party	Candidate	Votes	%
Democratic	John "Andy" Anders	9,217	69.42
Democratic	Justin Conner	4,060	30.58
Total votes		13,277	100

=== District 22 ===
2011 Louisiana's 22nd State House district election
Primary election
Party	Candidate	Votes	%
Republican	Billy Chandler	5,790	40.83
Independent	Terry Brown	4,724	33.31
Republican	Tim Murphy	3,666	25.85
Total votes		14,180	100
Independent	Terry Brown	6,015	52.40
Republican	Billy Chandler	5,465	47.60
Total votes		11,480	100

=== District 23 ===
2011 Louisiana's 23rd State House district election
Primary election
Party	Candidate	Votes	%
Republican	Rick Nowlin	5,662	43.64
Democratic	Kenny Ray Cox	5,506	42.44
Democratic	Ralph Wilson	1,805	13.91
Total votes		12,973	100
Democratic	Kenny Ray Cox	5,556	53.56
Republican	Rick Nowlin	4,817	46.44
Total votes		10,373	100

=== District 24 ===
2011 Louisiana's 24th State House district election
Primary election
Party	Candidate	Votes	%
Republican	Frank Howard		100
Total votes			100

=== District 25 ===
2011 Louisiana's 25th State House district election
Primary election
Party	Candidate	Votes	%
Republican	Lance Harris	7,577	55.45
Republican	Barrett Byrd	6,088	44.55
Total votes		13,655	100

=== District 26 ===
2011 Louisiana's 26th State House district election
Primary election
Party	Candidate	Votes	%
Democratic	Herbert Dixon		100
Total votes			100

=== District 27 ===
2011 Louisiana's 27th State House district election
Primary election
Party	Candidate	Votes	%
Republican	Lowell Hazel	8,089	60.78
Republican	Randy Wiggins	5,220	39.22
Total votes		13,309	100

=== District 28 ===
2011 Louisiana's 28th State House district election
Primary election
Party	Candidate	Votes	%
Democratic	Robert Johnson	8,037	62.76
Republican	Kirby Roy III	4,768	37.24
Total votes		12,805	100

=== District 29 ===
2011 Louisiana's 29th State House district election
Primary election
Party	Candidate	Votes	%
Democratic	Regina Barrow	5,933	63.95
Democratic	Edmond Jordan	3,345	36.05
Total votes		9,278	100

=== District 30 ===
2011 Louisiana's 30th State House district election
Primary election
Party	Candidate	Votes	%
Democratic	James Armes	3,874	54.51
Republican	Gregory Lord	1,995	28.07
Republican	Jack Causey	1,238	17.42
Total votes		7,107	100

=== District 31 ===
2011 Louisiana's 31st State House district election
Primary election
Party	Candidate	Votes	%
Republican	Nancy Landry		100
Total votes			100

=== District 32 ===
2011 Louisiana's 32nd State House district election
Primary election
Party	Candidate	Votes	%
Democratic	Dorothy Hill	9,257	78.32
Independent	John Arthur Williams	2,563	21.68
Total votes		11,820	100

=== District 33 ===
2011 Louisiana's 33rd State House district election
Primary election
Party	Candidate	Votes	%
Democratic	Mike Danahay		100
Total votes			100

=== District 34 ===
2011 Louisiana's 34th State House district election
Primary election
Party	Candidate	Votes	%
Democratic	Albert Franklin	5,683	78.10
Democratic	Paul Geary	1,594	21.90
Total votes		7,277	100

=== District 35 ===
2011 Louisiana's 35th State House district election
Primary election
Party	Candidate	Votes	%
Republican	Brett Geymann		100
Total votes			100

=== District 36 ===
2011 Louisiana's 36th State House district election
Primary election
Party	Candidate	Votes	%
Republican	Charles "Chuck" Kleckley		100
Total votes			100

=== District 37 ===
2011 Louisiana's 37th State House district election
Primary election
Party	Candidate	Votes	%
Republican	John Guinn		100
Total votes			100

=== District 38 ===
2011 Louisiana's 38th State House district election
Primary election
Party	Candidate	Votes	%
Democratic	H. Bernard LeBas	6,923	51.82
Republican	Julie Harrington	3,787	28.35
Republican	Peter Vidrine	2,649	19.83
Total votes		13,359	100

=== District 39 ===
2011 Louisiana's 39th State House district election
Primary election
Party	Candidate	Votes	%
Republican	Don Menard	4,555	44.45
Democratic	Stephen Ortego	3,590	35.03
Independent	James Arnaud	2,103	20.52
Total votes		10,248	100
Democratic	Stephen Ortego	4,457	54.97
Republican	Don Menard	3,651	45.03
Total votes		8,108	100

=== District 40 ===
2011 Louisiana's 40th State House district election
Primary election
Party	Candidate	Votes	%
Democratic	Ledricka Thierry	8,289	78.61
Democratic	Joe Pitre	2,256	21.39
Total votes		10,545	100

=== District 41 ===
2011 Louisiana's 41st State House district election
Primary election
Party	Candidate	Votes	%
Democratic	Mickey Guillory		100
Total votes			100

=== District 42 ===
2011 Louisiana's 42nd State House district election
Primary election
Party	Candidate	Votes	%
Democratic	Jack Montoucet	6,587	62.97
Republican	Anthony Emmons	3,873	37.03
Total votes		10,460	100

=== District 43 ===
2011 Louisiana's 43rd State House district election
Primary election
Party	Candidate	Votes	%
Republican	Stuart Bishop		100
Total votes			100

=== District 44 ===
2011 Louisiana's 44th State House district election
Primary election
Party	Candidate	Votes	%
Democratic	Rickey Hardy	2,974	42.53
Democratic	Vincent Pierre	2,823	40.37
Democratic	Roshell Jones	1,196	17.10
Total votes		6,993	100
Democratic	Vincent Pierre	3,286	53.43
Democratic	Rickey Hardy	2,864	46.57
Total votes		6,150	100

=== District 45 ===
2011 Louisiana's 45th State House district election
Primary election
Party	Candidate	Votes	%
Republican	Joel Robideaux	7,133	78.81
Libertarian	W. David Chance	1,918	21.19
Total votes		9,051	100

=== District 46 ===
2011 Louisiana's 46th State House district election
Primary election
Party	Candidate	Votes	%
Republican	Mike "Pete" Huval		100
Total votes			100

=== District 47 ===
2011 Louisiana's 47th State House district election
Primary election
Party	Candidate	Votes	%
Republican	Bob Hensgens		100
Total votes			100

=== District 48 ===
2011 Louisiana's 48th State House district election
Primary election
Party	Candidate	Votes	%
Republican	Taylor Barras		100
Total votes			100

=== District 49 ===
2011 Louisiana's 49th State House district election
Primary election
Party	Candidate	Votes	%
Republican	Simone Champagne	7,028	69.45
Democratic	Larry Rader	2,135	21.10
Republican	John Bering	956	9.45
Total votes		10,119	100

=== District 50 ===
2011 Louisiana's 50th State House district election
Primary election
Party	Candidate	Votes	%
Democratic	Sam Jones		100
Total votes			100

=== District 51 ===
2011 Louisiana's 51st State House district election
Primary election
Party	Candidate	Votes	%
Republican	Joe Harrison	6,226	71.78
Independent	Howard John Castay Jr.	2,448	28.22
Total votes		8,674	100

=== District 52 ===
2011 Louisiana's 52nd State House district election
Primary election
Party	Candidate	Votes	%
Republican	Gordon Dove		100
Total votes			100

=== District 53 ===
2011 Louisiana's 53rd State House district election
Primary election
Party	Candidate	Votes	%
Republican	Lenar Whitney	3,752	40.24
Republican	Billy Hebert	2,908	31.19
Republican	Theresa Ellender	2,663	28.56
Total votes		9,323	100
Republican	Lenar Whitney	3,709	59.24
Republican	Billy Hebert	2,552	40.76
Total votes		6,261	100

=== District 54 ===
2011 Louisiana's 54th State House district election
Primary election
Party	Candidate	Votes	%
Democratic	Jerry Gisclair	5,465	58.61
Independent	Micah Hebert	3,859	41.39
Total votes		9,324	100

=== District 55 ===
2011 Louisiana's 55th State House district election
Primary election
Party	Candidate	Votes	%
Independent	Jerome Richard	8,123	78.04
Republican	Bobby Grabert	2,286	21.96
Total votes		10,409	100

=== District 56 ===
2011 Louisiana's 56th State House district election
Primary election
Party	Candidate	Votes	%
Republican	Gregory A. Miller	6,532	49.59
Democratic	G. "Ram" Ramachandran	5,163	39.19
Republican	Emile Garlepied	1,478	11.22
Total votes		13,173	100
Republican	Gregory A. Miller	5,201	62.33
Democratic	G. "Ram" Ramachandran	3,143	37.67
Total votes		8,344	100

=== District 57 ===
2011 Louisiana's 57th State House district election
Primary election
Party	Candidate	Votes	%
Democratic	Randal Gaines	6,532	41.77
Independent	Russ Wise	3,768	28.81
Democratic	Albert Burl III	1,644	12.57
Democratic	Shane Bailey	1,641	12.55
Democratic	Olangee Breech	562	4.30
Total votes		13,078	100
Democratic	Randal Gaines	5,677	69.02
Independent	Russ Wise	2,548	30.98
Total votes		8,225	100

=== District 58 ===
2011 Louisiana's 58th State House district election
Primary election
Party	Candidate	Votes	%
Democratic	Ed Price	5,455	45.71
Democratic	Dwayne Bailey	3,563	29.85
Democratic	Gail Holland	1,925	16.13
Democratic	Heurlin Delpit	992	8.31
Total votes		11,935	100
Democratic	Ed Price	4,816	58.29
Democratic	Dwayne Bailey	3,447	41.72
Total votes		8,263	100

=== District 59 ===
2011 Louisiana's 59th State House district election
Primary election
Party	Candidate	Votes	%
Republican	Eddie J. Lambert		100
Total votes			100

=== District 60 ===
2011 Louisiana's 60th State House district election
Primary election
Party	Candidate	Votes	%
Democratic	Karen St. Germain	14,783	86.07
Republican	Jason Morris	2,393	13.93
Total votes		17,176	100

=== District 61 ===
2011 Louisiana's 61st State House district election
Primary election
Party	Candidate	Votes	%
Democratic	C. Denise Marcelle	2,780	41.07
Democratic	Alfred C. Williams	2,171	32.07
Democratic	Donna Collins-Lewis	1,818	26.86
Total votes		6,769	100
Democratic	Alfred C. Williams	2,052	52.78
Democratic	C. Denise Marcelle	1,836	47.22
Total votes		3,888	100

=== District 62 ===
2011 Louisiana's 62nd State House district election
Primary election
Party	Candidate	Votes	%
Republican	Kenny Havard	4,233	30.18
Democratic	Ken Dawson	3,281	23.39
Democratic	Ronnie Jett	3,097	22.08
Republican	Bob Arnold	2,437	17.38
Republican	Rob Farmer	977	6.97
Total votes		14,025	100
Republican	Kenny Havard	6,626	61.37
Democratic	Ken Dawson	4,170	38.63
Total votes		10,976	100

=== District 63 ===
2011 Louisiana's 63rd State House district election
Primary election
Party	Candidate	Votes	%
Democratic	Dalton Honore	4,832	61.55
Republican	Barbara Thomas	1,558	19.84
Democratic	Ronald L. Rogers Jr.	1,133	14.43
Independent	Hillery Godfred Johnson	328	4.18
Total votes		7,851	100

=== District 64 ===
2011 Louisiana's 64th State House district election
Primary election
Party	Candidate	Votes	%
Republican	Valarie Hodges	7,145	69.12
Republican	Barry Elkins	3,194	30.89
Total votes		10,339	100

=== District 65 ===
2011 Louisiana's 65th State House district election
Primary election
Party	Candidate	Votes	%
Republican	Clifton Richardson		100
Total votes			100

=== District 66 ===
2011 Louisiana's 66th State House district election
Primary election
Party	Candidate	Votes	%
Republican	Hunter Greene		100
Total votes			100

=== District 67 ===
2011 Louisiana's 67th State House district election
Primary election
Party	Candidate	Votes	%
Democratic	Patricia Haynes Smith	2,916	61.13
Democratic	Lorri Burgess	1,854	38.87
Total votes		4,770	100

=== District 68 ===
2011 Louisiana's 68th State House district election
Primary election
Party	Candidate	Votes	%
Republican	Stephen Carter		100
Total votes			100

=== District 69 ===
2011 Louisiana's 69th State House district election
Primary election
Party	Candidate	Votes	%
Republican	Erich Ponti		100
Total votes			100

=== District 70 ===
2011 Louisiana's 70th State House district election
Primary election
Party	Candidate	Votes	%
Republican	Franklin Foil	6,947	77.36
Independent	Greg Baldwin	2,033	22.34
Total votes		8,980	100

=== District 71 ===
2011 Louisiana's 71st State House district election
Primary election
Party	Candidate	Votes	%
Republican	J. Rogers Pope		100
Total votes			100

=== District 72 ===
2011 Louisiana's 72nd State House district election
Primary election
Party	Candidate	Votes	%
Democratic	John Bel Edwards	9,968	83.07
Independent	Johnny Duncan	2,032	16.93
Total votes		12,000	100

=== District 73 ===
2011 Louisiana's 73rd State House district election
Primary election
Party	Candidate	Votes	%
Republican	Steven Pugh	7,464	81.10
Republican	David Englade	1,740	18.90
Total votes		9,204	100

=== District 74 ===
2011 Louisiana's 74th State House district election
Primary election
Party	Candidate	Votes	%
Republican	Scott Simon		100
Total votes			100

=== District 75 ===
2011 Louisiana's 75th State House district election
Primary election
Party	Candidate	Votes	%
Democratic	Harold Ritchie		100
Total votes			100

=== District 76 ===
2011 Louisiana's 76th State House district election
Primary election
Party	Candidate	Votes	%
Republican	Kevin Pearson		100
Total votes			100

=== District 77 ===
2011 Louisiana's 77th State House district election
Primary election
Party	Candidate	Votes	%
Republican	John Schroder		100
Total votes			100

=== District 78 ===
2011 Louisiana's 78th State House district election
Primary election
Party	Candidate	Votes	%
Republican	Kirk Talbot		100
Total votes			100

=== District 79 ===
2011 Louisiana's 79th State House district election
Primary election
Party	Candidate	Votes	%
Republican	Anthony Ligi		100
Total votes			100

=== District 80 ===
2011 Louisiana's 80th State House district election
Primary election
Party	Candidate	Votes	%
Republican	Joseph Lopinto		100
Total votes			100

=== District 81 ===
2011 Louisiana's 81st State House district election
Primary election
Party	Candidate	Votes	%
Republican	Clay Schexnayder	5,183	41.15
Democratic	Kevin Hull	3,218	25.55
Republican	Don Wheat	1,716	13.63
Republican	Gills Windham	1,626	12.91
Republican	Laura O'Halloran	851	6.76
Total votes		12,594	100
Republican	Clay Schexnayder	5,549	62.59
Democratic	Kevin Hull	3,316	37.41
Total votes		8,865	100

=== District 82 ===
2011 Louisiana's 82nd State House district election
Primary election
Party	Candidate	Votes	%
Republican	Cameron Henry		100
Total votes			100

=== District 83 ===
2011 Louisiana's 83rd State House district election
Primary election
Party	Candidate	Votes	%
Democratic	Robert Billiot	4,202	57.29
Democratic	Kyle Green	3,133	42.71
Total votes		7,335	100

=== District 84 ===
2011 Louisiana's 84th State House district election
Primary election
Party	Candidate	Votes	%
Republican	Patrick Connick		100
Total votes			100

=== District 85 ===
2011 Louisiana's 85th State House district election
Primary election
Party	Candidate	Votes	%
Republican	Bryan Adams	3,942	57.21
Republican	Stephen Leonard	2,948	42.79
Total votes		6,890	100

=== District 86 ===
2011 Louisiana's 86th State House district election
Primary election
Party	Candidate	Votes	%
Republican	Chris Broadwater	3,337	37.36
Republican	George Holton	2,037	22.81
Republican	Joel Morgan	1,570	17.58
Independent	David Ridder	1,099	12.30
Democratic	Ivory Dyson	889	9.95
Total votes		8,932	100
Republican	Chris Broadwater	2,800	56.85
Republican	George Holton	2,125	43.15
Total votes		4,925	100

=== District 87 ===
2011 Louisiana's 87th State House district election
Primary election
Party	Candidate	Votes	%
Democratic	Girod Jackson III		100
Total votes			100

=== District 88 ===
2011 Louisiana's 88th State House district election
Primary election
Party	Candidate	Votes	%
Republican	Johnny Berthelot	6,766	71.42
Republican	Coral Lambert	1,377	14.53
Democratic	Gary Lacombe	1,331	14.05
Total votes		9,474	100

=== District 89 ===
2011 Louisiana's 89th State House district election
Primary election
Party	Candidate	Votes	%
Republican	Timothy Burns	6,157	69.11
Republican	Pat Phillips	2,752	30.89
Total votes		8,909	100

=== District 90 ===
2011 Louisiana's 90th State House district election
Primary election
Party	Candidate	Votes	%
Republican	George Cromer	5,030	74.93
Republican	Ron Eldridge	1,683	25.07
Total votes		6,713	100

=== District 91 ===
2011 Louisiana's 91st State House district election
Primary election
Party	Candidate	Votes	%
Democratic	Walt Leger III		100
Total votes			100

=== District 92 ===
2011 Louisiana's 92nd State House district election
Primary election
Party	Candidate	Votes	%
Republican	Tom Willmott		100
Total votes			100

=== District 93 ===
2011 Louisiana's 93rd State House district election
Primary election
Party	Candidate	Votes	%
Democratic	Helena Moreno		100
Total votes			100

=== District 94 ===
2011 Louisiana's 94th State House district election
Primary election
Party	Candidate	Votes	%
Republican	Nicholas Lorusso	5,317	57.22
Republican	John LaBruzzo	3,976	42.78
Total votes		9,293	100

=== District 95 ===
2011 Louisiana's 95th State House district election
Primary election
Party	Candidate	Votes	%
Republican	Sherman Q. Mack	6,526	61.24
Democratic	Lonnie Watts	3,499	32.36
Independent	Matthew Mitchell	682	6.40
Total votes		10,657	100

=== District 96 ===
2011 Louisiana's 96th State House district election
Primary election
Party	Candidate	Votes	%
Independent	Eric Martin	3,760	40.68
Democratic	Terry Landry Sr.	2,939	31.80
Democratic	Raymond Lewis	931	10.07
Democratic	Richard Potier	611	6.61
Independent	Vincent Alexander	509	5.51
Democratic	Nary Smith	493	5.33
Total votes		9,243	100
Democratic	Terry Landry Sr.	4,641	55.95
Independent	Eric Martin	3,654	44.05
Total votes		8,295	100

=== District 97 ===
2011 Louisiana's 97th State House district election
Primary election
Party	Candidate	Votes	%
Democratic	Jared Brossett		100
Total votes			100

=== District 98 ===
2011 Louisiana's 98th State House district election
Primary election
Party	Candidate	Votes	%
Democratic	Neil Abramson	5,793	73.60
Republican	John French	2,078	26.40
Total votes		7,871	100

=== District 99 ===
2011 Louisiana's 99th State House district election
Primary election
Party	Candidate	Votes	%
Democratic	Wesley T. Bishop	4,378	81.57
Democratic	Samuel Cowart	989	18.43
Total votes		5,367	100

=== District 100 ===
2011 Louisiana's 100th State House district election
Primary election
Party	Candidate	Votes	%
Democratic	Austin Badon Jr.		100
Total votes			100

=== District 101 ===
2011 Louisiana's 101st State House district election
Primary election
Party	Candidate	Votes	%
Democratic	Edward "Ted" James	2,033	29.26
Democratic	Tiffany Foxworth	1,897	27.30
Republican	Harold Williams	1,196	17.21
Republican	Sarah Holliday	850	12.23
Democratic	Jonathan Holloway Sr.	505	7.27
Democratic	Frederic Reed	468	6.73
Total votes		6,949	100
Democratic	Edward "Ted" James	2,414	58.06
Democratic	Tiffany Foxworth	1,744	41.94
Total votes		4,158	100

=== District 102 ===
2011 Louisiana's 102nd State House district election
Primary election
Party	Candidate	Votes	%
Democratic	Jeff Arnold	4,970	81.21
Democratic	Carlos Williams	1,150	18.79
Total votes		6,120	100

=== District 103 ===
2011 Louisiana's 103rd State House district election
Primary election
Party	Candidate	Votes	%
Republican	Ray Garofalo	4,249	31.37
Democratic	Chad Lauga	3,714	27.42
Republican	Michael Bayham	3,255	24.03
Democratic	Cullen Tonry	2,325	17.17
Total votes		13,543	100
Republican	Ray Garofalo	7,153	53.32
Democratic	Chad Lauga	6,262	46.68
Total votes		13,415	100

=== District 104 ===
2011 Louisiana's 104th State House district election
Primary election
Party	Candidate	Votes	%
Republican	Paul Hollis	3,905	55.78
Republican	Christopher Trahan	3,096	44.22
Total votes		7,001	100

=== District 105 ===
2011 Louisiana's 105th State House district election
Primary election
Party	Candidate	Votes	%
Republican	Harold Asevedo	3,611	33.40
Republican	Chris Leopold	3,517	32.53
Democratic	John Friedman	3,255	30.11
Republican	Mark Magee	429	3.97
Total votes		10,812	100
Republican	Chris Leopold	4,786	53.36
Republican	Harold Asevedo	4,183	46.64
Total votes		8,969	100

== See also ==
- 2011 United States state legislative elections
- 2011 Louisiana State Senate election
