= 2014 United States Senate election in Louisiana =

- November 4, 2014 (first round); December 6, 2014 (runoff)
- Turnout: 51.5% ▲ (first round) 43.6% ▼ (runoff)
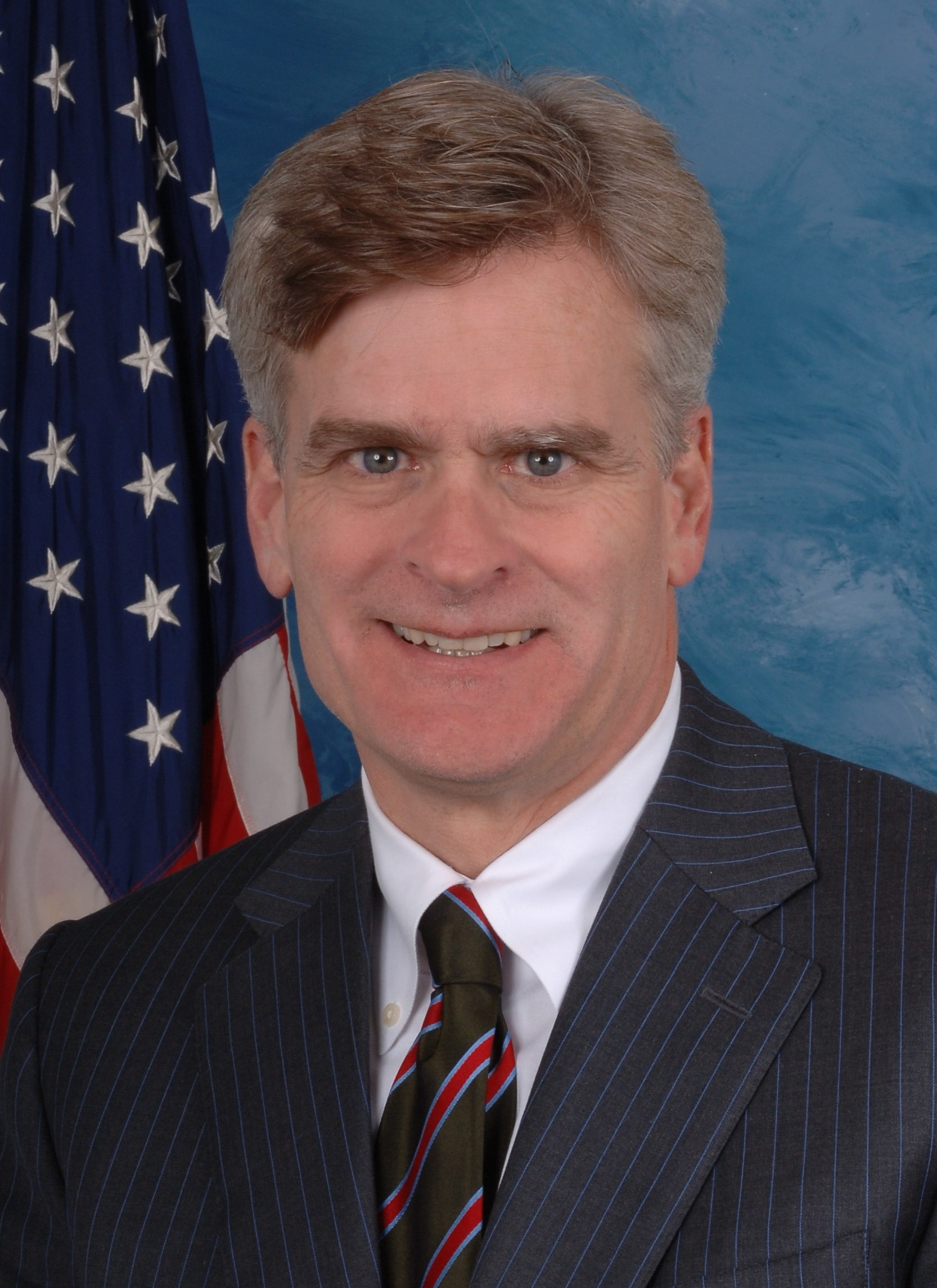

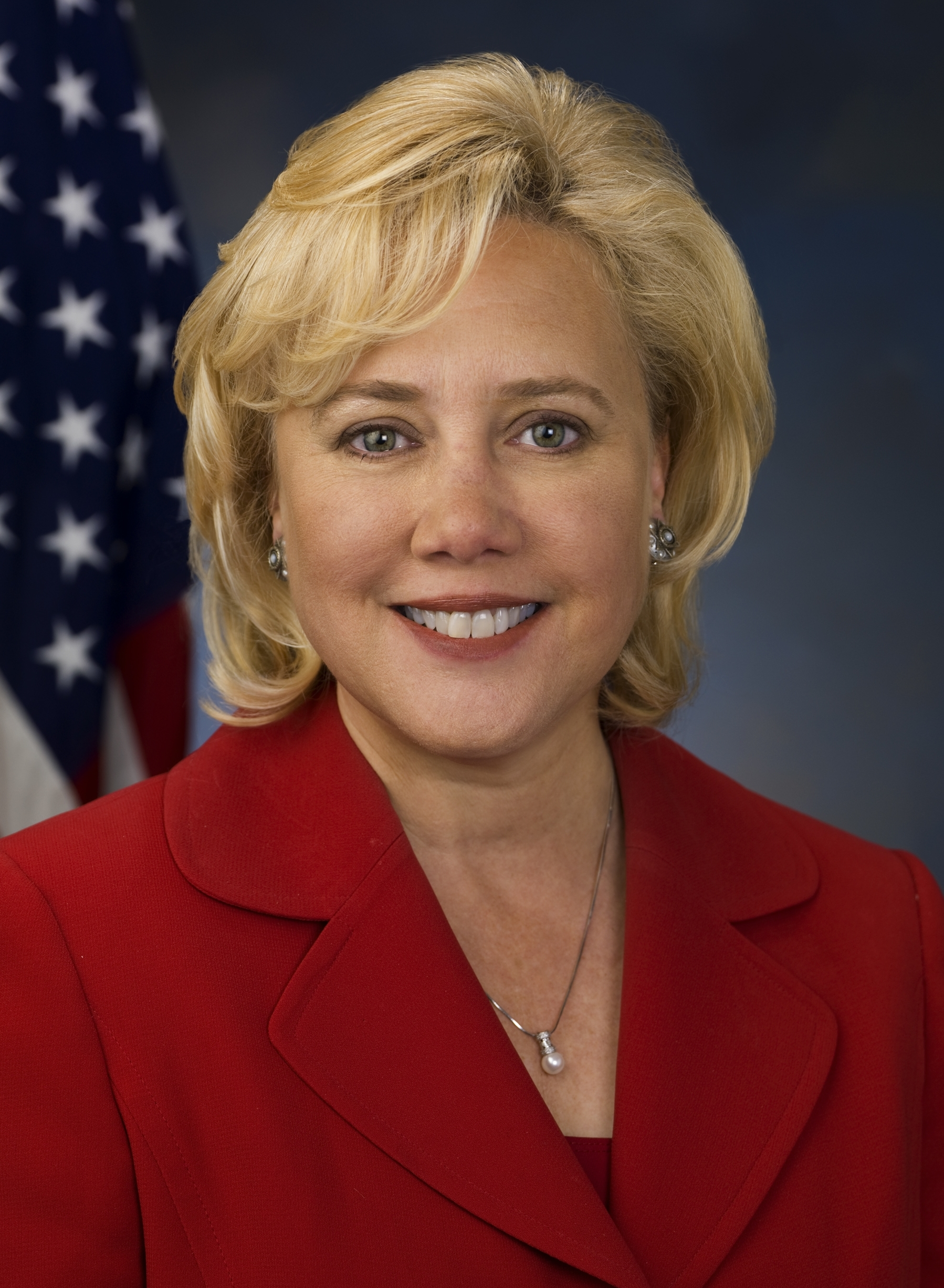

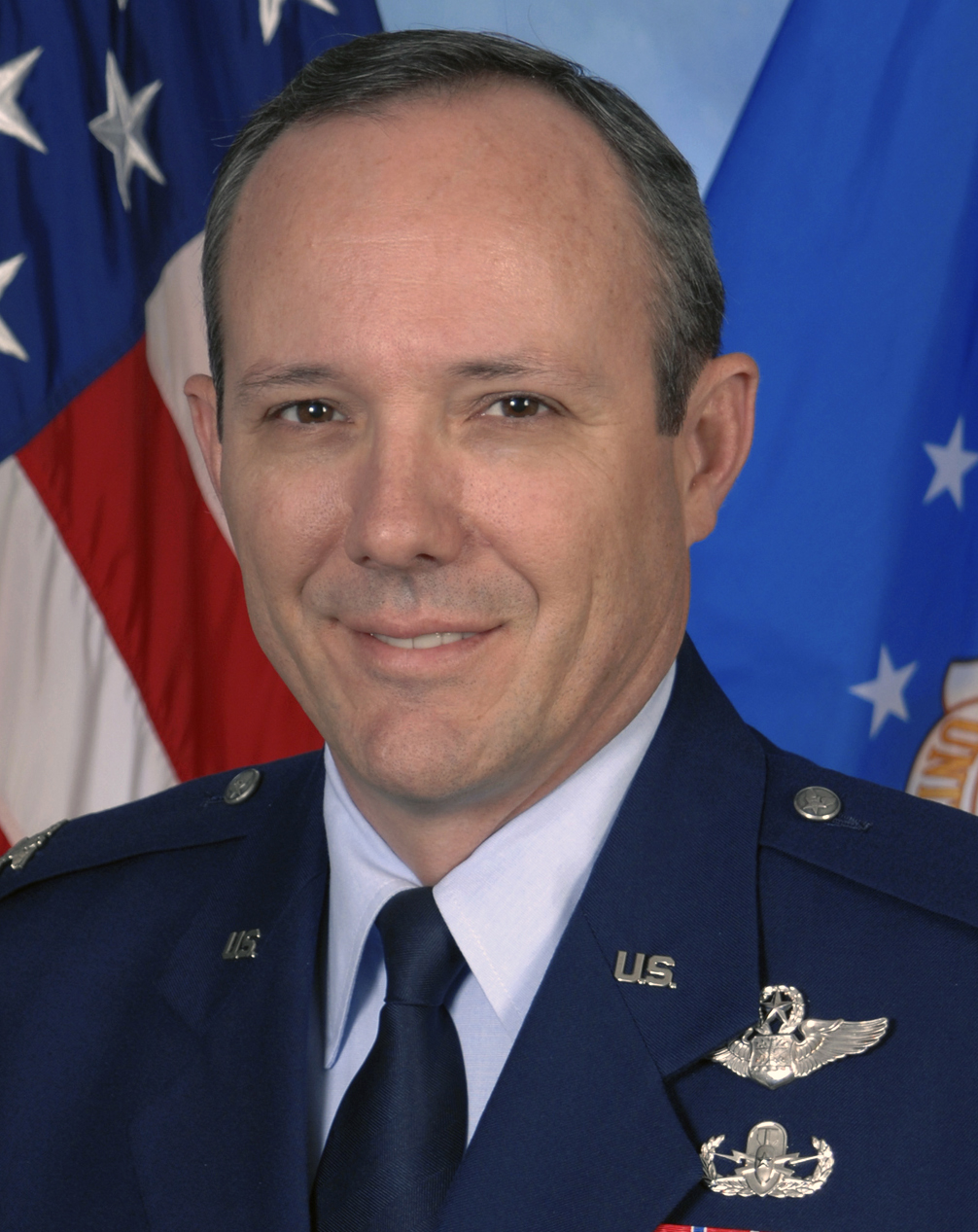
Nominee	Bill Cassidy	Mary Landrieu	Rob Maness
Party	Republican	Democratic	Republican
First round	603,048; 40.92%	619,402; 42.03%	202,556; 13.74%
Runoff	712,379; 55.93%	561,210; 44.07%	Eliminated
- Cassidy: 30–40% 40–50% 50–60% 60–70% 70–80% 80–90% >90% Landrieu: 30–40% 40–50% 50–60% 60–70% 70–80% 80–90% >90% Maness: 30–40% 40–50% 50–60% 60–70% 80–90% >90% Ables: >90% Tie: 30–40% 40–50% No votes Cassidy: 30–40% 40–50% 50–60% 60–70% 70–80% 80–90% >90% Landrieu: 30–40% 40–50% 50–60% 60–70% 70–80% 80–90% >90% Maness: 30–40% 40–50% 50–60% 60–70% 80–90% >90% Ables: >90% Tie: 30–40% 40–50% No votes Cassidy: 30–40% 40–50% 50–60% 60–70% 70–80% 80–90% >90% Landrieu: 30–40% 40–50% 50–60% 60–70% 70–80% 80–90% >90% Maness: 30–40% 40–50% 50–60% 60–70% 80–90% >90% Ables: >90% Tie: 30–40% 40–50% No votes Cassidy: 50–60% 60–70% 70–80% 80–90% >90% Landrieu: 50–60% 60–70% 70–80% 80–90% >90% Cassidy: 50–60% 60–70% 70–80% 80–90% >90% Landrieu: 50–60% 60–70% 70–80% 80–90% >90% Cassidy: 50–60% 60–70% 70–80% 80–90% >90% Landrieu: 50–60% 60–70% 70–80% 80–90% >90%
U.S. senator before election
Mary Landrieu
Democratic
Elected U.S. Senator
Bill Cassidy
Republican

The 2014 United States Senate election in Louisiana was held on November 4, 2014, to elect a member of the United States Senate to represent the State of Louisiana.

Incumbent Senator Mary Landrieu ran for re-election to a fourth term in office against U.S. Representative Bill Cassidy and several other candidates. This was one of the seven Democratic-held Senate seats up for election in a state that Mitt Romney won in the 2012 presidential election.

Under Louisiana's jungle primary system, all candidates appear on the same ballot, regardless of party and voters may vote for any candidate, regardless of their party affiliation. Louisiana is the only state that has a jungle primary system (California and Washington have a similar "top two primary" system). Since no candidate received a majority of the vote in the primary election, a runoff election was held on December 6, 2014, between the top two candidates, Landrieu and Cassidy.

In the December 6 runoff, Cassidy defeated Landrieu by 11.86 percentage points (55.93% to 44.07%), settling the fate of the final Senate seat of the 2014 midterms, becoming the first Republican to hold this seat since 1883, and giving Senate Republicans 54 seats in the 114th Congress. Since Cassidy took office in 2015, Republicans have held both of Louisiana's Senate seats, which they had not done since William Pitt Kellogg resigned in 1872. Cassidy's victory in the 2014 runoff also rendered Cedric Richmond as Louisiana's only congressional Democrat.

== Background ==
Elections in Louisiana, with the exception of U.S. presidential elections, follow a variation of the open primary system called the jungle primary. Candidates of any and all parties are listed on one ballot; voters need not limit themselves to the candidates of one party. Unless one candidate takes more than 50% of the vote in the first round, a run-off election is then held between the top two candidates, who may in fact be members of the same party. This scenario occurred in the 7th District congressional race in 1996, when Democrats Chris John and Hunter Lundy made the runoff for the open seat, and in 1999, when Republicans Suzanne Haik Terrell and Woody Jenkins made the runoff for commissioner of elections.

== Candidates ==
=== Democratic Party ===
==== Declared ====
- Wayne Ables
- Mary Landrieu, incumbent U.S. senator
- Vallian Senegal
- William Waymire, retired Marine

==== Withdrew ====
- Raymond Brown, minister, civil rights activist and candidate for the U.S. Senate in 1998 and 2002 (endorsed Landrieu)

==== Declined ====
- Edwin Edwards, former governor of Louisiana and former U.S. representative (running for LA-06)

=== Republican Party ===
==== Declared ====
- Bill Cassidy, U.S. representative
- Thomas Clements, small business owner
- Rob Maness, retired U.S. Air Force colonel

==== Withdrew ====
- Paul Hollis, state representative

==== Declined ====
- Scott Angelle, member of the Louisiana Public Service Commission and former lieutenant governor of Louisiana
- Charles Boustany, U.S. representative
- Jay Dardenne, lieutenant governor of Louisiana
- John Fleming, U.S. representative
- Elbert Guillory, state senator
- Bobby Jindal, governor of Louisiana
- Jeff Landry, former U.S. representative
- Tony Perkins, president of the Family Research Council, former state representative and candidate for the U.S. Senate in 2002
- Phil Robertson, reality television star
- Buddy Roemer, former governor of Louisiana, former U.S. representative and candidate for president of the United States in 2012
- Chas Roemer, president of the Louisiana Board of Elementary and Secondary Education and son of former Governor Buddy Roemer
- Steve Scalise, U.S. representative
- Alan Seabaugh, state representative

=== Libertarian Party ===
==== Declared ====
- Brannon McMorris, electrical engineer

== Jungle primary ==
=== Debates ===
- Complete video of debate, October 14, 2014
- Complete video of debate, October 29, 2014

=== Endorsements ===
Mary Landrieu (D)

Individuals

- Boysie Bollinger, former chair of the Republican Party of Louisiana
- Joe Canizaro, real estate developer and Republican fundraiser
- Hillary Clinton, 67th United States secretary of state, 2008 presidential candidate and then-potential 2016 presidential candidate

Organizations

- United States Chamber of Commerce
Bill Cassidy (R)

Politicians

- Conrad Appel, state senator
- Kelly Ayotte, U.S. senator (R-NH)
- Chris Broadwater, state representative
- Joseph Cao, former U.S. representative (R-LA)
- John Cornyn, U.S. senator (R-TX)
- Jack Donahue, state senator
- Franklin Foil, state representative
- Newt Gingrich, former speaker of the United States House of Representatives and candidate for president in 2012
- Hunter Greene, state representative
- Elbert Guillory, state senator
- Lance Harris, state house majority leader
- Joe Harrison, state representative
- Cameron Henry, state representative
- Valarie Hodges, state representative
- Frank A. Hoffmann, state representative
- Paul Hollis, state representative
- Mike Huckabee, former governor of Arkansas and candidate for president in 2008
- Chuck Kleckley, state house speaker
- Robert Kostelka, state senator
- Joseph Lopinto, state representative
- Sherman Q. Mack, state representative
- Danny Martiny, state senate majority leader
- Henson Moore, former U.S. representative (R-LA)
- Rick Perry, governor of Texas and candidate for president in 2012
- Erich Ponti, state representative
- J. Rogers Pope, state representative
- Clay Schexnayder, state representative
- John Schroder, state representative
- Alan Seabaugh, state house assistant majority leader
- Scott Simon, state representative
- Mert Smiley, Ascension Parish assessor and former state representative
- David Vitter, U.S. senator (R-LA) (2005-2017)
- Mike Walsworth, state senator

Individuals

- Skip Bertman, former baseball coach and athletic director at LSU
- Ben Carson, former neurosurgeon at Johns Hopkins University; then-potential candidate for the Republican nomination for president of the United States in the 2016 election
Rob Maness (R)

Politicians

- Sarah Palin, former governor of Alaska and Republican nominee for vice president in 2008
- Tony Perkins, president of the Family Research Council and former state representative

Individuals

- Mark Levin, activist
- Phyllis Schlafly, activist

Organizations

- Americans for Legal Immigration PAC
- Combat Veterans for Congress
- Conservative Campaign Committee
- Conservative Majority Fund
- Eagle Forum
- Family Research Council Action Political Action Committee
- Gun Owners of America
- Madison Project PAC
- Marine Vet for Freedom
- National Association for Gun Rights
- National Defense PAC
- National Pro-Life Alliance
- Patriot PAC
- Republican Liberty Caucus
- Restore America's Voices PAC
- Senate Conservatives Fund
- Special Operations Speaks
- Tea Party Express
- Tea Party Leadership Fund
- Western Representation PAC

=== Polling ===
View source data.

Poll source	Date(s) administered	Sample size	Margin of error	Mary Landrieu (D)	Bill Cassidy (R)	Paul Hollis (R)	Rob Maness (R)	Other	Undecided
Public Policy Polling	August 16–19, 2013	721	± 3.6%	48%	24%	—	5%	—	23%
Southern Media & Opinion Research	November 6–12, 2013	600	± 4%	41%	34%	—	10%	—	16%
Harper Polling	January 19–20, 2014	992	± 3.11%	42%	29%	4%	4%	—	20%
Public Policy Polling	February 6–9, 2014	635	± 3.9%	43%	25%	5%	3%	—	25%
Magellan Strategies	March 24–26, 2014	600	± 4.1%	39%	26%	3%	3%	—	28%
Harper Polling	April 7–9, 2014	538	± 4.22%	40%	35%	3%	4%	—	18%
New York Times/Kaiser Family	April 8–15, 2014	946	± ?	42%	18%	5%	4%	3%	27%
Southern Media & Opinion Research	April 28–30, 2014	600	± 4%	36%	35%	4%	7%	—	18%
Greenberg Quinlan Rosner	May 5–8, 2014	600	± 4%	48%	29%	8%	7%	—	8%
Public Policy Polling	June 26–29, 2014	664	± 3.8%	44%	27%	5%	8%	—	17%
Senate Conservatives Fund	August 16–18, 2014	600	± 4%	43%	32%	—	16%	1%	8%
CBS News/NYT/YouGov	August 18 – September 2, 2014	870	± 5%	36%	38%	—	10%	3%	11%
Greenberg Quinlan Rosner	August 28 – September 2, 2014	600	± 4%	47%	32%	—	13%	—	8%
Gravis Marketing	September 5–9, 2014	426	± 5%	45%	30%	—	14%	—	12%
Fox News	September 14–16, 2014	617	± 4%	31%	35%	—	7%	—	16%
CNN/ORC	September 22–25, 2014	610 LV	± 4%	43%	40%	—	9%	4%	4%
CNN/ORC	September 22–25, 2014	866 RV	± 3.5%	45%	35%	—	8%	6%	5%
Public Policy Polling	September 25–28, 2014	1,141	± 2.9%	42%	34%	—	12%	2%	10%
Hickman Analytics	September 26 – October 2, 2014	502	± 4.4%	39%	30%	—	6%	5%	19%
0ptimus	September 30 – October 2, 2014	5,711	± 1.3%	38%	36%	—	18%	—	9%
Rasmussen Reports	October 13–14, 2014	965	± 3%	41%	38%	—	14%	2%	5%
Vox Populi Polling	October 13–14, 2014	546	± 4.2%	38%	38%	—	10%	6%	8%
Multi-Quest International	October 14–19, 2014	605	± 4%	36%	32%	—	6%	3%	23%
Rasmussen Reports	October 22–23, 2014	988	± 3%	43%	36%	—	13%	3%	6%
CBS News/NYT/YouGov	October 16–23, 2014	1,316	± 5%	37%	32%	—	5%	5%	19%
University of New Orleans	October 11–24, 2014	590	± 4.1%	38%	33%	—	7%	1%	21%
Suffolk University	October 23–26, 2014	500	± 4%	36%	35%	—	11%	3%	15%
NBC News/Marist	October 26–30, 2014	630 LV	± 3.9%	44%	36%	—	15%	1%	4%
NBC News/Marist	October 26–30, 2014	961 RV	± 3.2%	42%	35%	—	15%	1%	6%
Public Policy Polling	October 30 – November 1, 2014	1,003	± 3.1%	43%	35%	—	15%	1%	6%

Hypothetical polling

Jungle primary

Poll source	Date(s) administered	Sample size	Margin of error	Mary Landrieu (D)	Bill Cassidy (R)	Paul Hollis (R)	Rob Maness (R)	Phil Robertson (R)	Undecided
Public Policy Polling	February 6–9, 2014	635	± 3.9%	40%	21%	5%	4%	13%	18%

Poll source	Date(s) administered	Sample size	Margin of error	Mary Landrieu (D)	Bill Cassidy (R)	John Fleming (R)	Elbert Guillory (R)	Chas Roemer (R)	Undecided
Public Policy Polling	August 16–19, 2013	721	± 3.6%	47%	20%	—	6%	2%	25%
Public Opinion Strategies^	March 3–5, 2013	500	± 4.38%	47%	14%	15%	—	6%	18%

- ^ Internal poll for John Fleming Campaign

Republican primary

Poll source	Date(s) administered	Sample size	Margin of error	Bill Cassidy (R)	Chas Roemer (R)	Undecided
Harper Polling	April 6–7, 2013	541	± 4.21%	38%	14%	48%

=== Results ===
United States Senate election jungle primary in Louisiana, 2014
Party	Candidate	Votes	%
Democratic	Mary Landrieu (incumbent)	619,402	42.08%
Republican	Bill Cassidy	603,048	40.97%
Republican	Rob Maness	202,556	13.76%
Republican	Thomas Clements	14,173	0.96%
Libertarian	Brannon McMorris	13,034	0.89%
Democratic	Wayne Ables	11,323	0.77%
Democratic	William Waymire	4,673	0.32%
Democratic	Vallian Senegal	3,835	0.26%
Total votes		1,473,826	100%

== Runoff ==
=== Debates ===
- Complete video of debate, December 1, 2014

=== Predictions ===
Source	Ranking	As of
The Cook Political Report	Lean R (flip)	November 21, 2014
Sabato's Crystal Ball	Safe R (flip)	December 4, 2014
Rothenberg Political Report	Lean R (flip)	November 6, 2014
Real Clear Politics	Likely R (flip)	November 19, 2014

=== Polling ===
Poll source	Date(s) administered	Sample size	Margin of error	Mary Landrieu (D)	Bill Cassidy (R)	Other	Undecided
Public Policy Polling	February 8–12, 2013	603	± 4%	50%	40%	—	10%
Harper Polling	April 6–7, 2013	541	± 4.21%	46%	41%	—	13%
On Message Inc.	August 13–15, 2013	600	± 4.0%	45%	43%	—	12%
Harper Polling	August 14–15, 2013	596	± 4.01%	45%	47%	—	8%
Public Policy Polling	August 16–19, 2013	721	± 3.6%	50%	40%	—	10%
Harper Polling	September 22–23, 2013	561	± 4.14%	46%	44%	—	10%
Public Policy Polling	October 14–15, 2013	632	± 3.9%	48%	41%	—	11%
Harper Polling	January 19–20, 2014	992	± 3.11%	44%	45%	—	11%
Rasmussen Reports	January 28–29, 2014	500	± 4.5%	40%	44%	5%	11%
Public Policy Polling	February 6–9, 2014	635	± 3.9%	45%	44%	—	10%
Hickman Analytics	February 17–24, 2014	404	± 4.9%	42%	46%	—	11%
Voter/Consumer Research	February 20–25, 2014	600	± 4%	45%	44%	1%	9%
Harper Polling	April 7–9, 2014	538	± 4.22%	43%	47%	—	10%
Magellan Strategies	April 14–15, 2014	775	± 3.52%	42%	44%	10%	4%
Greenberg Quinlan Rosner	May 5–8, 2014	600	± 4%	49%	49%	—	2%
Magellan Strategies	June 5–8, 2014	719	± 3.65%	44%	50%	5%	1%
Public Policy Polling	June 26–29, 2014	664	± 3.8%	47%	47%	—	6%
Rasmussen Reports	July 8–9, 2014	750	± 4%	46%	43%	5%	6%
CBS News/NYT/YouGov	July 5–24, 2014	1,456	± 3.5%	46%	47%	6%	2%
Senate Conservatives Fund	August 16–18, 2014	600	± 4%	49%	43%	—	8%
Greenberg Quinlan Rosner	August 28 – September 2, 2014	600	± 4%	48%	46%	—	6%
Rasmussen Reports	September 2–3, 2014	800	± 3.5%	41%	44%	9%	6%
Gravis Marketing	September 5–9, 2014	426	± 5%	45%	45%	—	10%
Fox News	September 14–16, 2014	617	± 4%	38%	51%	—	9%
CNN/ORC	September 22–25, 2014	610 LV	± 4%	47%	50%	—	3%
CNN/ORC	September 22–25, 2014	866 RV	± 3.5%	51%	45%	—	4%
Public Policy Polling	September 25–28, 2014	1,141	± 2.9%	45%	48%	—	7%
CBS News/NYT/YouGov	September 20 – October 1, 2014	2,187	± 2%	41%	47%	0%	13%
Hickman Analytics	September 26 – October 2, 2014	502	± 4.4%	45%	46%	—	9%
Rasmussen Reports	October 13–14, 2014	965	± 3%	43%	52%	—	5%
Vox Populi Polling	October 13–14, 2014	546	± 4.2%	44%	48%	—	8%
Multi-Quest International	October 14–19, 2014	605	± 4%	40%	43%	—	17%
Rasmussen Reports	October 22–23, 2014	988	± 3%	46%	50%	—	4%
CBS News/NYT/YouGov	October 16–23, 2014	1,316	± 5%	42%	46%	0%	12%
University of New Orleans	October 11–24, 2014	590	± 4.1%	43%	51%	—	6%
Suffolk University	October 23–26, 2014	500	± 4%	41%	48%	—	11%
NBC News/Marist	October 26–30, 2014	630 LV	± 3.9%	45%	50%	1%	5%
NBC News/Marist	October 26–30, 2014	961 RV	± 3.2%	44%	49%	2%	6%
Public Policy Polling	October 30 – November 1, 2014	1,003	± 3.1%	47%	48%	—	5%
Gravis Marketing	November 12–14, 2014	643	± 4%	38%	59%	—	3%
Vox Populi Polling	November 16–17, 2014	761	± 3.55%	42%	53%	—	5%
Rasmussen Reports	November 16–19, 2014	1,000	± 3%	41%	56%	—	3%
JJMC Analytics	November 20, 2014	754	± 3.6%	40%	55%	—	5%
GEB International	November 20, 2014	850	± 3.36%	34%	60%	—	6%
WPA Opinion Research	November 24–25, 2014	500	± 4.4%	33%	57%	—	10%
Rasmussen Reports	December 2–4, 2014	1,000	± 3%	40%	56%	—	4%

Hypothetical polling

Poll source	Date(s) administered	Sample size	Margin of error	Mary Landrieu (D)	Charles Boustany (R)	Undecided
Public Policy Polling	February 8–12, 2013	603	± 4%	48%	42%	10%

Poll source	Date(s) administered	Sample size	Margin of error	Mary Landrieu (D)	Jay Dardenne (R)	Undecided
Public Policy Polling	February 8–12, 2013	603	± 4%	46%	43%	11%

Poll source	Date(s) administered	Sample size	Margin of error	Mary Landrieu (D)	John Fleming (R)	Undecided
Public Policy Polling	February 8–12, 2013	603	± 4%	50%	38%	12%

Poll source	Date(s) administered	Sample size	Margin of error	Mary Landrieu (D)	Elbert Guillory (R)	Undecided
Harper Polling	August 14–15, 2013	596	± 4.01%	44%	44%	11%
Public Policy Polling	August 16–19, 2013	721	± 3.6%	50%	36%	14%

Poll source	Date(s) administered	Sample size	Margin of error	Mary Landrieu (D)	Paul Hollis (R)	Undecided
Public Policy Polling	February 6–9, 2014	635	± 3.9%	48%	42%	10%

Poll source	Date(s) administered	Sample size	Margin of error	Mary Landrieu (D)	Bobby Jindal (R)	Undecided
Public Policy Polling	February 8–12, 2013	603	± 4%	49%	41%	10%

Poll source	Date(s) administered	Sample size	Margin of error	Mary Landrieu (D)	Jeff Landry (R)	Undecided
Public Policy Polling	February 8–12, 2013	603	± 4%	48%	39%	13%

Poll source	Date(s) administered	Sample size	Margin of error	Mary Landrieu (D)	Rob Maness (R)	Other	Undecided
Harper Polling	August 14–15, 2013	596	± 4.01%	47%	41%	—	12%
Public Policy Polling	August 16–19, 2013	721	± 3.6%	50%	37%	—	13%
Public Policy Polling	February 6–9, 2014	635	± 3.9%	47%	42%	—	10%
Senate Conservatives Fund	August 16–18, 2014	600	± 4%	48%	44%	—	8%
CNN/ORC	September 22–25, 2014	610 LV	± 4%	48%	48%	—	4%
CNN/ORC	September 22–25, 2014	866 RV	± 3.5%	53%	42%	—	5%
NBC News/Marist	October 26–30, 2014	630 LV	± 3.9%	46%	50%	1%	4%
NBC News/Marist	October 26–30, 2014	961 RV	± 3.2%	46%	47%	1%	5%

Poll source	Date(s) administered	Sample size	Margin of error	Mary Landrieu (D)	Phil Robertson (R)	Undecided
Public Policy Polling	February 6–9, 2014	635	± 3.9%	42%	46%	12%

Poll source	Date(s) administered	Sample size	Margin of error	Mary Landrieu (D)	Chas Roemer (R)	Undecided
Harper Polling	April 6–7, 2013	541	± 4.21%	46%	33%	21%

Poll source	Date(s) administered	Sample size	Margin of error	Mary Landrieu (D)	Steve Scalise (R)	Undecided
Public Policy Polling	February 8–12, 2013	603	± 4%	48%	38%	14%

=== Results ===
United States Senate election runoff in Louisiana, 2014
Party	Candidate	Votes	%	±%
Republican	Bill Cassidy	712,379	55.93%	+10.21%
Democratic	Mary Landrieu (incumbent)	561,210	44.07%	−8.04%
Total votes		1,273,589	100%	N/A
Republican gain from Democratic				

==== Parishes that flipped from Democratic to Republican ====
- Allen (largest city: Oakdale)
- Avoyelles (largest city: Marksville)
- Calcasieu (largest city: Lake Charles)
- Cameron (largest community: Grand Lake)
- Claiborne (largest town: Homer)
- Concordia (largest city: Vidalia)
- DeSoto (largest city: Mansfield)
- East Feliciana (largest town: Jackson)
- Evangeline (largest city: Ville Platte)
- Iberia (largest city: New Iberia)
- Jefferson (largest city: Metairie)
- Lincoln (largest city: Ruston)
- Lafourche (largest city: Thibodaux)
- Morehouse (largest city: Bastrop)
- Natchitoches (largest city: Natchitoches)
- Plaquemines (largest community: Belle Chasse)
- Red River (largest town: Coushatta)
- Saint Martin (largest city: Breaux Bridge)
- Saint Mary (largest city: Morgan City)
- Washington (largest city: Bogalusa)
- Webster (largest city: Minden)
- West Feliciana (largest town: St. Francisville)
- West Baton Rouge (largest city: Port Allen)

==== By congressional district ====
Cassidy won five of the six congressional districts in Louisiana.

District	Cassidy	Landrieu	Representative
1st	65.64%	34.36%	Steve Scalise
2nd	19.64%	80.36%	Cedric Richmond
3rd	66.19%	33.81%	Charles Boustany
4th	58.38%	41.62%	John Fleming
5th	60.96%	39.04%	Ralph Abraham
6th	64.03%	35.97%	Garret Graves

== See also ==
- 2014 United States Senate elections
- 2014 United States elections
