= Louisiana's 81st House of Representatives district =

American legislative district

Louisiana's 81st State House of Representatives district
Representative
Jeffrey Wiley; R–Maurepas

Louisiana's 81st House of Representatives district is one of 105 Louisiana House of Representatives districts. It is currently represented by Republican Jeffrey Wiley of Ascension Parish, Louisiana.

== Geography ==
HD81 makes up the northern border of Jefferson Parish. It spans through the parishes of Ascension, Livingston, and St. James, including the Towns of Sorrento, Gramercy, Killian, the village of Port Vincent, and the census-designated place of Convent.

== Election results ==
Year	Winning candidate	Party	Percent	Opponent	Party	Percent
2003	John LaBruzzo	Republican	57%	Mickey Landry	Republican	43%
2007	John LaBruzzo	Republican	Cancelled			
2011	Clay Schexnayder	Republican	64%	Kevin Hull	Democratic	36%
2015	Clay Schexnayder	Republican	64.5%	Lester McLin	Republican	35.5%
2019	Clay Schexnayder	Republican	Cancelled			
2023	Jeffrey Wiley	Republican	55.5%	Jason Amato	Republican	44.5%
