= Louisiana's 95th House of Representatives district =

American legislative district

Louisiana's 95th State House of Representatives district
Representative
Shane Mack; R–Livingston

Louisiana's 95th House of Representatives district is one of 105 Louisiana House of Representatives districts. It is currently represented by Republican Shane Mack.

== Geography ==
HD95 includes the towns of Livingston, Albany and a portion of the cities of Walker, and Denham Springs.

== Election results ==
Year	Winning candidate	Party	Percent	Opponent	Party	Percent	Opponent	Party	Percent
2011	Sherman Mack	Republican	61.2%	Lonnie Watts	Democrat	32.4%	Matthew Mitchell	Independent	6.4%
2015	Sherman Mack	Republican	100%						
2019	Sherman Mack	Republican	78.3%	Robin Parrott	Democratic	21.7%			
2023	Shane Mack	Republican	59.5%	Aaron Ellis	Republican	40.5%			
