= Louisiana's 24th House of Representatives district =

American legislative district

Louisiana's 24th State House of Representatives district
Representative
Rodney Schamerhorn; R–Hornbeck

Louisiana's 24th House of Representatives district is one of 105 Louisiana House of Representatives districts. It is currently represented by Republican Rodney Schamerhorn of Hornbeck.

== Geography ==
HD24 includes the cities of Leesville and Hornbeck.

== Election results ==
Year	Winning candidate	Party	Percent	Opponent	Party	Percent	Opponent	Party	Percent
2011	Frank Howard	Republican	100%						
2015	Frank Howard	Republican	58.7%	Rodney Schamerhorn	Republican	41.3%			
2019	Rodney Schamerhorn	Republican	52.6%	Gregory Lord	Republican	37.5%	Willie Banks	Independent	10%
2023	Rodney Schamerhorn	Republican	60.2%	Clarence Beebe	Republican	39.8%			
