= Louisiana's 25th State Senate district =

American legislative district

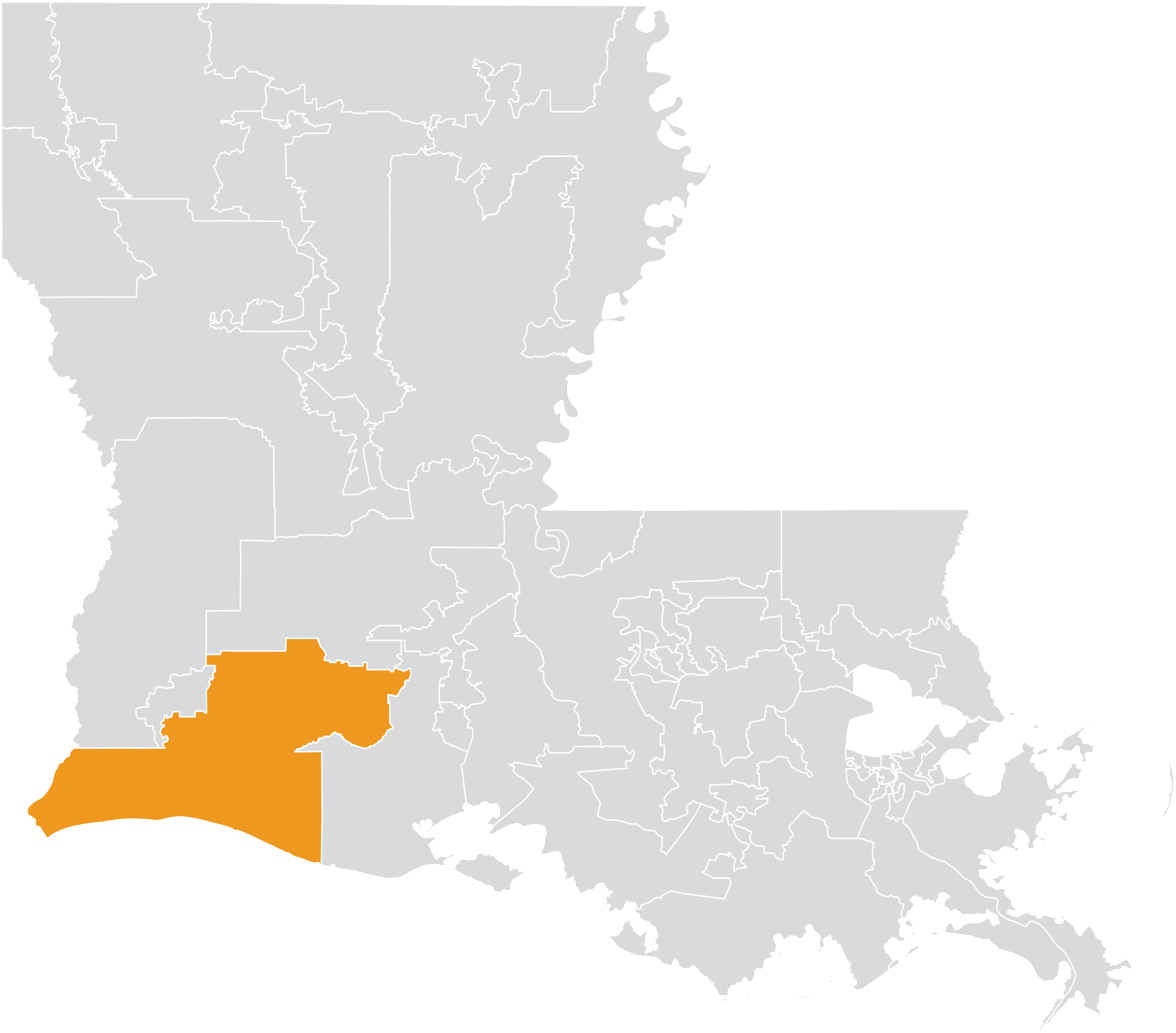
Senator
Mark Abraham; R–Lake Charles
- Registration: 38.0% Democratic; 34.8% Republican; 27.2% No party preference
- Demographics: 78% White; 15% Black; 4% Hispanic; 1% Asian; 2% Other
- Population (2019): 126,778
- Registered voters: 80,836

Louisiana's 25th State Senate district is one of 39 districts in the Louisiana State Senate. It has been represented by Republican Mark Abraham since 2020.

== Geography ==
District 25 covers all of Cameron and Jefferson Davis Parishes and parts of Acadia and Calcasieu Parishes in Louisiana's far southeastern corner, including some or all of Crowley, Jennings, Welsh, Lake Arthur, Iowa, and Hackberry.

The district is located entirely within Louisiana's 3rd congressional district, and overlaps with the 34th, 36th, 37th, 41st, 42nd, and 47th districts of the Louisiana House of Representatives.

== Recent election results ==
Louisiana uses a jungle primary system. If no candidate receives 50% in the first round of voting, when all candidates appear on the same ballot regardless of party, the top-two finishers advance to a runoff election.

=== 2019 ===
2019 Louisiana State Senate election, District 25
Party	Candidate	Votes	%
Republican	Mark Abraham	19,670	54.1
Republican	Kevin Berken	8,553	23.5
Republican	John E. Guinn	8,144	22.4
Total votes		36,367	100
Republican hold			

=== 2015 ===
2015 Louisiana State Senate election, District 25
Party	Candidate	Votes	%
Republican	Dan Morrish (incumbent)	Unopposed	100
Total votes		Unopposed	100
Republican hold			

=== 2011 ===
2011 Louisiana State Senate election, District 25
Party	Candidate	Votes	%
Republican	Dan Morrish (incumbent)	Unopposed	100
Total votes		Unopposed	100
Republican hold			

=== Federal and statewide results ===
Year	Office	Results
2020	President	Trump 77.3–21.1%
2019	Governor (runoff)	Rispone 65.5–34.5%
2016	President	Trump 76.3–20.4%
2015	Governor (runoff)	Vitter 50.1–49.9%
2014	Senate (runoff)	Cassidy 73.4–26.6%
2012	President	Romney 75.6–22.6%
