= Louisiana's 98th House of Representatives district =

American legislative district

Louisiana's 98th State House of Representatives district
Representative
| Aimee Freeman; D–New Orleans |

Louisiana's 98th House of Representatives district is one of 105 Louisiana House of Representatives districts. It is currently represented by Democrat Aimee Freeman.

== Geography ==
HD98 is located entirely within the City of New Orleans.

== Election results ==
| Year | Winning candidate | Party | Percent | Opponent | Party | Percent |
|---|---|---|---|---|---|---|
| 2007 | Neil Abramson | Democratic | 74% | James P. Johnson | Democratic | 26% |
| 2011 | Neil Abramson | Democratic | 73.6% | John French | Republican | 26.4% |
| 2015 | Neil Abramson | Democratic | Cancelled | | | |
| 2019 | Aimee Freeman | Democratic | 57.8% | Kea Sherman | Democratic | 42.2% |
| 2023 | Aimee Freeman | Democratic | Cancelled | | | |
