= Louisiana's 23rd House of Representatives district =

American legislative district

Louisiana's 23rd State House of Representatives district
Representative
Shaun Raphael Mena; D–New Orleans

Louisiana's 23rd House of Representatives district is one of 105 Louisiana House of Representatives districts. It is currently represented by Democratic Shaun Raphael Mena of New Orleans.

== Geography ==
HD23 includes a portion of the centre the state's largest city of New Orleans, alongside districts 91, 93, 97, and 98, all of which it is adjacent to. Specifically, this district covers the neighborhood of Mid-City.

== Election results ==
Year	Winning candidate	Party	Percent	Opponent	Party	Percent
2011	Kenny Ray Cox	Democratic	53.4%	Rick Nowlin	Republican	46.6%
2015	Kenny Ray Cox	Democratic	100%			
2019	Kenny Ray Cox	Democratic	100%			
2023	Shaun Raphael Mena	Democratic	57.9%	Tammy Savoie	Democratic	42.1%
