= Louisiana's 12th House of Representatives district =

American legislative district

Louisiana's 12th State House of Representatives district
Representative
Christopher Turner; R–Ruston

Louisiana's 12th House of Representatives district is one of 105 Louisiana House of Representatives districts. It is currently represented by Republican Christopher Turner of Ruston.

== Geography ==
HD12 includes the towns of Bernice, Dubach, Farmersville, Marion, Spearsville and Vienna. Additionally, the district includes a small part of the city of Ruston.

== Election results ==
Year	Winning candidate	Party	Percent	Opponent	Party	Percent
2011	Rob Shadoin	Republican	54.4%	Jason Bullock	Republican	45.6%
2015	Rob Shadoin	Republican	100%			
2019 (Special)	Christopher Turner	Republican	69.9	Jake Halley	Republican	30.1%
2019	Christopher Turner	Republican	100%			
2023	Christopher Turner	Republican	Cancelled			
