= Charles Jefferson (American football) =

American football player (born 1957)

No. 21
- Position: Defensive back

Personal information
- Born: May 5, 1957 (age 69); New Orleans, Louisiana, U.S.
- Listed height: 6 ft 7 in (2.01 m)
- Listed weight: 270 lb (122 kg)

Career information
- High school: Capitol (Baton Rouge, Louisiana)
- College: McNeese State
- NFL draft: 1979: 4th round, 105th overall pick

Career history
- Denver Broncos (1979); Houston Oilers (1979–1980)
- Stats at Pro Football Reference

Charles Ray Jefferson (born May 5, 1957) is an American former professional football player who was a defensive back for the Houston Oilers of the National Football League (NFL). He played college football for the McNeese State Cowboys.

Jefferson was born on May 5, 1957, in New Orleans, Louisiana. He attended Capitol High School and is one of three of their alumni to play in the NFL. He began attending McNeese State University in 1975. As a sophomore in 1976, Jefferson helped McNeese win their first Southland Conference championship while reaching the Independence Bowl. He was the team leader and conference leader with seven interceptions on the season and placed seventh in the nation in that category, being a unanimous first-team choice on the all-conference team. He also received selection to the Louisiana Sports Writers Association All-Louisiana team.

Jefferson again led McNeese in interceptions in 1977 and was named second-team all-conference. As a senior, he led the team in interceptions, with six, for the third straight year and also led the conference in that category, being a unanimous first-team All-Southland choice. He ended his collegiate career with 19 interceptions, which ranked second in school history and in the top 10 all-time in state history as of 2014.

Selected by the Denver Broncos in the fourth round (105th overall) of the 1979 NFL draft, Jefferson was placed on injured reserve before the season began. He was waived in October and claimed off waivers by the Houston Oilers. He appeared in five regular season games as a backup and later played in the team's two playoff games, for seven combined appearances in the 1979 season. He became among the first 10 NFL alumni in McNeese history. Jefferson was placed on injured reserve to begin the 1980 season. He was waived prior to the 1981 season.

Jefferson was named in a poll to the Southland Conference 1970s All-Decade team in 2013 and one year later was inducted into the McNeese State Hall of Fame. He wrote a book on his life, titled Memoirs: The Legacy of a Professional Football Player, in 2019.
