= 2011 Louisiana State Senate election =

2011 Louisiana Senate election
- November 8, 2011

All 39 seats in the Louisiana State Senate 20 seats needed for a majority
	Majority party	Minority party
Party	Republican	Democratic
- Results: Republican hold Republican gain Democratic hold Democratic gain
Speaker before election
Republican
Elected Speaker
Republican

The 2011 Louisiana State Senate election was held on November 8, 2011. All 39 seats in the Louisiana State Senate were up for election to four-year terms. It was held concurrently with elections for all statewide offices and the Louisiana House of Representatives.

== See also ==
- 2011 United States state legislative elections
- 2011 Louisiana House of Representatives election
