= Neil Abramson =

Neil Abramson may refer to:

- Neil Abramson (politician) (born 1967), American politician
- Neil Abramson (filmmaker) (born 1963), American filmmaker
