= Shane Mack =

Shane Mack may refer to:

- Shane Mack (baseball) (born 1963), baseball player
- Shane Mack (singer) (born 1974), country music singer
- Shane Mack (politician), member of the Louisiana House of Representatives
