= Shaun Raphael Mena =

American politician

Shaun Mena

Member of the Louisiana House of Representatives from the 23rd district
- Incumbent
- Assumed office January 8, 2024
- Preceded by: Kenny Ray Cox

Personal details
- Party: Democratic
- Education: Louisiana State University (BA); Southern University Law Center (JD)

Shaun Raphael Mena is an American politician serving as a member of the Louisiana House of Representatives from the 23rd district, representing Orleans Parish. He assumed office on January 8, 2024.

== Career ==
Mena was elected to the 23rd district seat in the Louisiana House of Representatives on November 18, 2023, after receiving 57.9% of the vote, against Tammy Savoie who received 42.1%.

== Personal life ==
Mena is Catholic.
