= Polly Thomas =

American politician

Polly Jung Thomas

Member of the Louisiana House of Representatives from the 80th district
- Incumbent
- Assumed office 2016
- Preceded by: Joseph Lopinto

Personal details
- Party: Republican
- Education: University of Southwestern Louisiana (BA); Texas A&M University (MS, PhD)

Polly Jung Thomas is an American politician and retired educator. She has been serving as a member of the Louisiana House of Representatives representing the 80th district, covering parts of Jefferson Parish, Louisiana, since 2016.

== Education ==
Thomas earned her BA degree from the University of Southwestern Louisiana and her MS and PhD degrees from Texas A&M University.
