= Mark Abraham =

American businessman and politician (born 1953)

Mark Thorpe Abraham

Member of the Louisiana Senate from the 25th district
- Incumbent
- Assumed office January 2020
- Preceded by: Dan Morrish

Member of the Louisiana House of Representatives from the 36th district
- In office January 2016 – January 2020
- Preceded by: Chuck Kleckley
- Succeeded by: Phillip Tarver

Personal details
- Born: November 11, 1953 (age 72)
- Party: Republican
- Spouse: Gina Abraham
- Children: 3
- Education: Louisiana State University
- Occupation: Real estate broker businessman
- Football career

Profile
- Position: Safety

Career information
- College: LSU Tigers

Mark Thorpe Abraham (born November 13, 1953) is a businessman and politician from Lake Charles. Since 2020, he has represented the 25th district in the Louisiana State Senate; he was previously a state representative for the 36th district from 2016 to 2020.

== Career ==
In the October 24, 2015 primary election, Abraham, with 5,607 votes (54.6 percent), defeated another Republican candidate, Keith DeSonier, who polled 4,654 votes (45.4 percent).

He is a former Republican member of the Louisiana House of Representatives for District 36 in Calcasieu Parish in southwestern Louisiana. On January 11, 2016, he succeeded the term-limited Republican Representative Chuck Kleckley, also the former Speaker of the Louisiana House of Representatives.

In 2019, Abraham won election to the 25th district in the State Senate, succeeding term-limited incumbent Republican Dan Morrish.

| Preceded by Chuck Kleckley | Louisiana State Representative for District 36 (Calcasieu Parish); Mark Thorpe Abraham; 2016 – 2020 | Succeeded by Phillip Tarver |
| Preceded by Dan Morrish | Louisiana State Senator for District 25; Mark Thorpe Abraham; 2020 – | Succeeded by Incumbent |
