= Louisiana's 61st House of Representatives district =

American legislative district

Louisiana's 61st State House of Representatives district
Representative
C. Denise Marcelle; D–Baton Rouge

Louisiana's 61st House of Representatives district is one of 105 Louisiana House of Representatives districts. It is currently represented by Democrat C. Denise Marcelle of Baton Rouge.

== Geography ==
HD61 is located entirely inside of the city of Baton Rouge.

== Election results ==
Year	Winning candidate	Party	Percent	Opponent	Party	Percent
2011	Alfred Williams	Democratic	52.8%	C. Denise Marcelle	Democratic	47.2%
2015	C. Denise Marcelle	Democratic	60.6%	Donna Collins-Lewis	Democratic	39.4%
2019	C. Denise Marcelle	Democratic	100%			
2023	C. Denise Marcelle	Democratic	Cancelled			
