= Joe Reece Salter =

American politician (1943–2025)

Member of the Louisiana House of Representatives from the 24th district
- In office 1986–2008 Serving with Johnny McFerren; Beverly Gourdon Bruce
- Preceded by: H. M. Fowler
- Succeeded by: Frank Howard

Speaker of the Louisiana House of Representatives
- In office 2004–2008
- Preceded by: Charles W. DeWitt Jr.
- Succeeded by: Jim Tucker

Personal details
- Born: August 13, 1943 Many, Louisiana, U.S.
- Died: August 16, 2025 (aged 82) Baton Rouge, Louisiana, U.S.
- Party: Democratic

Joe Reece Salter (August 13, 1943 – August 16, 2025) was an American politician from the state of Louisiana. He served as Speaker of the Louisiana House of Representatives from 2004 to 2008.

== Life and career ==
Salter was born in Many, Louisiana, and grew up in Redland, Louisiana. An alumnus of Northwestern State University, he resided in Florien, Louisiana and was an educator. His career included time as principal of Florien High School and a stint as president of the Louisiana High School Athletic Association and as assistant superintendent of Sabine Parish Schools. Salter represented District 24 and belonged to the Democratic Party. He served in the House from 1986 to 2008, when term limits prevented him from running for reelection.

Salter was inducted into the Sabine Hall of Fame. He died in Baton Rouge on August 16, 2025, at the age of 82.

== See also ==
- List of speakers of the Louisiana House of Representatives
