= Louisiana's 80th House of Representatives district =

American legislative district

Louisiana's 80th State House of Representatives district
Representative
Polly Thomas; R–Metairie

Louisiana's 80th House of Representatives district is one of 105 Louisiana House of Representatives districts. It is currently represented by Republican Polly Thomas of Metairie.

== Geography ==
HD80 makes up the northern border of Jefferson Parish. It spans through a majority of the community of Metairie.

== Election results ==
Year	Winning candidate	Party	Percent	Opponent	Party	Percent
2007	Joseph Lopinto	Republican	58.6%	Glenn Lee	Republican	41.4%
2011	Joseph Lopinto	Republican	100%			
2015	Joseph Lopinto	Republican	100%			
2016 - Special	Polly Thomas	Republican	Off			
2019	Polly Thomas	Republican	70.3%	John Mason	Republican	29.7%
2023	Polly Thomas	Republican	Cancelled			
