= A. Hays Town =

American architect

- Born: June 17, 1903; Crowley, Louisiana, United States
- Died: January 6, 2005 (aged 101); Baton Rouge, Louisiana, United States
- Occupation: Architect
- Children: A. Hays Town Jr. and Blanche Town Gladney

A. Hays Town (June 17, 1903 – January 6, 2005) was an American architect whose career spanned over sixty-five years. While Town designed commercial and governmental buildings in the style of modern architecture for the first forty years of his career, he became best known for his residential architecture, which was heavily influenced by the Spanish, French, and Creole history of Louisiana. His work was featured in several publications during his lifetime, including Time, Life, Southern Living, and Southern Accents. Today, there are an estimated 1,000 homes remaining that were designed and built by Town, and his distinct style continues to exert an influence on modern Southern architecture.

Town used many recycled building materials, such as this retired sugar kettle.

Town hand picked the wood for the interior of his homes.

== Works ==
- Capitol High School in Baton Rouge
- Tri Delta Sorority House in Baton Rouge
- LaSalle Elementary School in Baton Rouge

== Additional sources ==
- Louisiana Houses of A. Hays Town by A. Hays Town, Cyril E. Vetter, and Philip Gould. Louisiana State University Press, 1999. ISBN 978-0-8071-2371-3
- The Architectural Style of A. Hays Town by A. Hays Town (Hardcover - Dec 1985)
- The Life and Work of the Twentieth-Century Louisiana Architect A. Hays Town (Mellen Studies in Architecture, V. 10) (Hardcover) by David H. Sachs (Author)
- The Southeastern Architectural Archive, Special Collections Division, Tulane University Librariess.
