= Rodney Schamerhorn =

American politician

Member of the Louisiana House of Representatives from the 24th district
- Incumbent
- Assumed office January 13, 2020
- Preceded by: Frank A. Howard

Personal details
- Born: Rodney Wayne Schamerhorn; January 11, 1955 (age 71) Jasper, Texas
- Party: Republican
- Spouse: Tammy
- Children: 2

Rodney Wayne Schamerhorn (born January 11, 1955) is an American politician and businessman serving as a member of the Louisiana House of Representatives from the 24th district.

== Early life and education ==
Schamerhorn was born in Jasper, Texas and raised in Florien, Louisiana. He graduated from Hicks High School in Vernon Parish, Louisiana. Schamerhorn studied at Louisiana College and Northwestern State University, but did not earn a degree.

== Career ==
He founded a company, Schamerhorn, Inc., in 1984, which offers trucking, demolition, and waste management services.

Schamerhorn contested the 2015 jungle primary for the Louisiana House of Representatives, and did not unseat district 24 incumbent Frank A. Howard. In September 2019, Schamerhorn announced that he would contest Howard's seat for a second time, as Howard was subject to term limits. In the 2019 jungle primary, Schamerhorn faced fellow Republican Gregory Lord and political independent Willie Banks. By winning a simple majority of the vote, Schamerhorn was elected Howard's successor. Schamerhorn was sworn into office on January 13, 2020. In 2023, Schamerhorn won reelection against Hornbeck mayor and fellow Republican Clarence Beebe.

Schamerhorn is a member of the House Rural Caucus and Republican Delegation.

== Personal life ==
Schamerhorn and his wife, Tammy, have two children.
