= Alfred C. Williams =

American politician (1951–2015)

Member of the Louisiana House of Representatives from the 61st district
- In office January 9, 2012 – August 4, 2015
- Preceded by: Michael L. Jackson
- Succeeded by: C. Denise Marcelle

Personal details
- Born: July 8, 1951
- Died: August 4, 2015 (aged 64)
- Party: Democratic
- Education: Southern University (B.A., J.D.)

Alfred C. Williams (July 8, 1951 – August 4, 2015) was a lawyer and state legislator in Louisiana. A member of the Democratic Party, he served as a member of the Louisiana House of Representatives from the 61st district from 2012 until his death in 2015.

He graduated from Capitol High School in 1969, and attended Southern University, graduating with his bachelor's degree in 1972. Williams then received his juris doctor from the Southern University Law Center in 1977.

He served on the Baton Rouge Parish School Board and was part of Baton Rouge Mayor Kip Holden’s administration.
