= Jeffrey Wiley =

American politician

Member of the Louisiana House of Representatives from the 81st district
- Incumbent
- Assumed office January 8, 2024
- Preceded by: Clay Schexnayder

Personal details
- Party: Republican
- Education: Southeastern Louisiana University (BA)
- Occupation: Retired Sheriff

Jeffrey Wiley is an American politician serving as a member of the Louisiana House of Representatives from the 81st district. A member of the Republican Party, Wiley representing parts of Ascension Parish, Livingston Parish, and St. James Parish, and has been in office since January 8, 2024. Wiley was the Ascension Parish Sheriff from 1996 to 2019.

== Tenure ==
In 2024, Wiley voted in favor of advancing House Bill 545 from the Administration of Criminal Justice committee. The bill, filed by Republican Beryl Amedee, would remove legal protections for obscenity from teachers and librarians in all Louisiana public schools.
