= C. Denise Marcelle =

American politician from Louisiana

Clara Denise Marcelle

Member of the Louisiana House of Representatives from the 61st district
- Incumbent
- Assumed office January 11, 2016
- Preceded by: Alfred C. Williams

Personal details
- Born: Baton Rouge, Louisiana, US
- Party: Democratic
- Education: Capitol Senior High School; Southern University
- Occupation: Outreach coordinator

Clara Denise Marcelle is a Democratic member of the Louisiana House of Representatives for District 61 in East Baton Rouge Parish, Louisiana. She succeeded her fellow Democrat Alfred C. Williams, who died in office on August 4, 2015.

In the primary election held on October 24, 2015, Marcelle won the right to succeed Williams by defeating a single opponent, her fellow Democrat Donna Collins-Lewis, 4,971 votes (60.6 percent) to 3,237 (39.4 percent).

Marcelle and the late State Representative Ronnie Edwards of District 29 both served on the Baton Rouge Metro-Council prior to their elections in 2015 to the state House. Edwards died in early 2016 of pancreatic cancer less than two months after taking office.

In 2016, she unsuccessfully ran to be mayor-president of Baton Rouge and the East Baton Rouge Parish.

She is an alumna of Capitol High School in Baton Rouge.

Louisiana House of Representatives
Preceded by Alfred C. Williams	Louisiana State Representative from the 61st district 2016 –	Succeeded by Incumbent
