= Joseph Lopinto =

American politician

Joseph Peter Lopinto III

Sheriff of Jefferson Parish, Louisiana
- Incumbent
- Assumed office August 30, 2017 (acting August 30, 2017 — March 24, 2018)
- Preceded by: Newell Normand

Louisiana State Representative for District 80 (Jefferson Parish)
- In office January 14, 2008 – June 30, 2016
- Preceded by: Charles D. Lancaster, Jr.
- Succeeded by: Polly Thomas

Personal details
- Born: June 11, 1976 (age 50)
- Party: Republican
- Spouse: Lauren Lopinto
- Education: Loyola University; Loyola University Law School
- Occupation: Attorney

Joseph Peter Lopinto III, known as Joe Lopinto (born June 11, 1976), is the Sheriff of Jefferson Parish Louisiana, a suburb within the New Orleans area. He is an attorney from Metairie, Louisiana, and was a Republican member of the Louisiana House of Representatives from District 80 in suburban Jefferson Parish outside New Orleans.

Lopinto began his career as a deputy sheriff with the Jefferson Parish Sheriff's Office in 1997. Upon graduating from the police academy, Lopinto worked in the First District (the east half of the Eastbank that encompasses Metairie) before being promoted to narcotics detective.

Lopinto graduated from the Roman Catholic-affiliated Loyola University and its law school, from which he received the Bachelor of Arts and Juris Doctor degrees.

Lopinto was elected to the legislature in 2007 to succeed Charles D. Lancaster, Jr. In the nonpartisan blanket primary, Lopinto defeated fellow Republican Glenn Lee, 6,170 (58.6 percent) to 4,357 (41.4 percent).

Lopinto was reelected to the House in the nonpartisan blanket primary held on October 22, 2011. Lopinto also holds the District 80 seat on the Louisiana Republican State Central Committee.

Entering his third and final House term on January 11, 2016, Lopinto has announced that he will cross party lines to support the Democrat Walt Leger, III, of New Orleans for Speaker of the Louisiana House of Representatives, the choice of incoming Governor John Bel Edwards. However, in an upset, lawmakers chose not Leger as Speaker but New Iberia Republican Taylor Barras.

On June 30, 2016, Lopinto resigned from the Louisiana legislature to become Chief Counsel at the Jefferson Parish Sheriff's Office. After serving as Chief Counsel, Sheriff Newell Normand appointed Lopinto to be Chief of Field Operations and also Chief Deputy, which is the highest appointed rank in a sheriff's office.

On August 30, 2017, Sheriff Normand unexpectedly resigned to take a job as a talk show host and Lopinto was appointed Interim Sheriff. During the subsequent race to complete Normand's term as Sheriff, Lopinto faced a challenge from John Fortunato, the longtime spokesman for the Jefferson Parish Sheriff's Office. On March 24, 2018, Lopinto was elected to complete Newell Normand's term as Sheriff of Jefferson Parish after defeating Fortunato 52% to 48%.

Louisiana House of Representatives
Preceded by Charles D. Lancaster, Jr.	Louisiana State Representative from District 80 (Jefferson Parish); 2008–	Succeeded by Incumbent
