= Herbert Dixon =

Herbert Dixon may refer to:

- Herbert Dixon (rugby union) (1869–1952), Scottish rugby union player
- Herbert Dixon, 1st Baron Glentoran (1880–1950), Northern Ireland Unionist politician
- Herbert Dixon (golfer) (1919–2026), American golfer
- Rap Dixon (Herbert Allen Dixon, 1902–1944), American baseball player

== See also ==
- Alfred Herbert Dixon (1857–1920), English industrialist
