= Rick Nowlin =

American politician

Member of the Louisiana House of Representatives
- In office 2008–2012
- Succeeded by: Kenny Ray Cox
- Constituency: District 23

Personal details
- Party: Republican

Rick Nowlin is an American politician from the Republican Party of Louisiana. He represented District 23 in the Louisiana House of Representatives. Nowlin was previously the President of the Parish of Natchitoches.

Nowlin endorsed the Donald Trump 2024 presidential campaign and was a delegate at the 2024 Republican National Convention.

In 2025, he was appointed to the Louisiana Board of Ethics.
