= John LaBruzzo =

American politician

John Frank LaBruzzo Jr

Louisiana State Representative for District 81 (then Jefferson Parish)
- In office 2004 – January 9, 2012
- Preceded by: Jennifer Sneed Heebe
- Succeeded by: Clay Schexnayder

Personal details
- Born: July 6, 1970 (age 56) New Orleans, Louisiana, U.S.
- Party: Republican
- Spouse: Brandi Davison LaBruzzo
- Children: 4
- Education: Saint Stanislaus College
- Occupation: Businessman

John Frank LaBruzzo (born July 6, 1970) is an American businessman who is a Republican former member of the Louisiana House of Representatives from District 81 in Jefferson Parish. LaBruzzo occupied the legislative district formerly held by Charles Cusimano, David Duke, and David Vitter.

== District profile ==
District 81 formerly included a section of Metairie, a large unincorporated area of Jefferson Parish, near the storied 17th Street Canal, which was breached in the aftermath of Hurricane Katrina. The district consisted of the mostly residential neighborhoods of "Bucktown" (until redistricting moved this area to District 94), "Hog Alley," and "Old Metairie."

Many of the residents were upper income, especially in the Old Metairie neighborhoods near the Metairie Country Club and enclaves on Metairie Road. There were pockets too of older, blue-collar residents and mostly middle-class whites. The district was arguably one of the most conservative in the state and had a large number of declared Republican voters.

In the House, LaBruzzo served on the Civil Law and Procedure, Health and Welfare, and Labor and Industrial Relations committees.

== Voluntary sterilization proposal ==
On September 23, 2008, LaBruzzo raised controversy by proposing that women who receive public welfare benefits should receive $1,000 if they voluntarily choose to be sterilized. The proposal was criticized by opponents as "racist, sexist, unethical, and immoral."

The plan was similar to a previous proposal by former Representative David Duke, whose 1991 legislation offered $100 a year to welfare recipients who used Norplant. That proposal too was defeated. LaBruzzo's proposal urged permanent sterilization, rather than the temporary birth control advocated by Duke. Norplant has a 5-year period of effectiveness.

Then State Senator Joe McPherson, a Democrat from Woodworth in Rapides Parish, said of LaBruzzo:

You don't know whether to laugh at him or run from him. He comes up with all kinds of outlandish proposals. They don't go anywhere. They keep him in the news, and maybe if that's what a politician is looking for, maybe he's accomplishing his purpose."

The public furor and negative reaction that arose over LaBruzzo's proposal led to his losing a leadership position. On October 6, 2008, he was removed by Speaker of the Louisiana House of Representatives Jim Tucker as the vice chairman of the House Health and Welfare Committee.

== 2011 Primary Defeat ==
Lorusso prevailed with 5,087 votes (56.6 percent) to LaBruzzo's 3,909 (43.5 percent).

The District 81 seat is now held by Republican Clay Schexnayder of Ascension Parish, a businessman who polled 5,549 votes (64 percent) in the low-turnout general election held on November 19, 2011. Schexnayder defeated Democrat Kevin Hull, who received 3,116 votes (36 percent).

== 2015 Comeback Falls Short ==
Early in 2015, laBruzzo announced he is considering making his political comeback on the Jefferson Parish Council.

Louisiana House of Representatives
Preceded by Jennifer Sneed Heebe	Louisiana State Representative for District 81 (then Jefferson Parish but since Ascension, Livingston, St. James, and St. John the Baptist parishes); 2008–2012	Succeeded by Clay Schexnayder
