= Chris Broadwater =

American politician (born 1972)

Christopher D. Broadwater
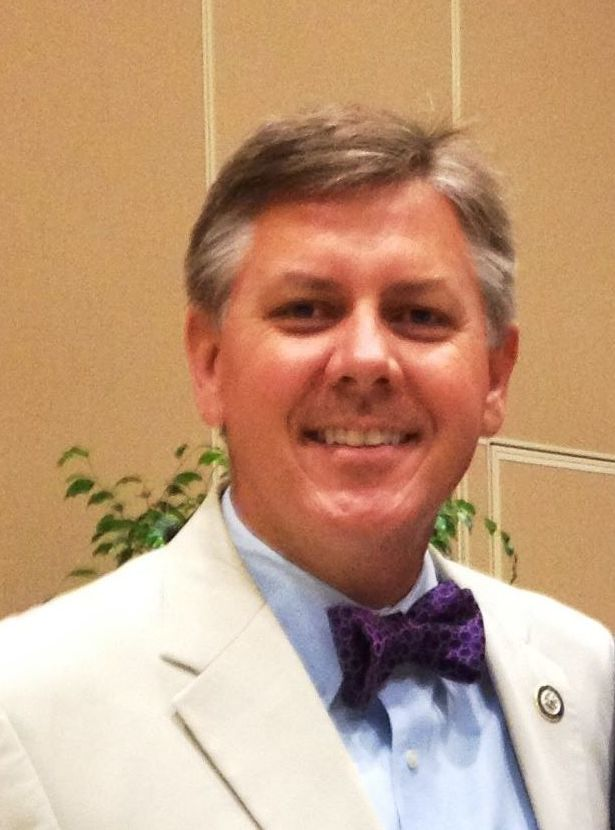

Louisiana State Representative for District 86 (Tangipahoa Parish)
- In office January 9, 2012 – December 2017
- Preceded by: Jim Tucker

Personal details
- Born: March 22, 1972 (age 54) St. Francisville; West Feliciana Parish; Louisiana, USA
- Party: Republican
- Education: Louisiana College New Orleans Baptist Theological Seminary Louisiana State University Law Center
- Occupation: Lawyer

Christopher D. Broadwater, known as Chris Broadwater (born March 22, 1972), is an attorney in Baton Rouge, Louisiana, who was a Republican member of the Louisiana House of Representatives for District 86, which encompasses within Tangipahoa Parish the communities of Independence, Tickfaw, Natalbany, and northwestern Hammond, Broadwater's own city of residence. Broadwater first won office in 2011 and abruptly resigned in December 2017.

== Background ==
A native of Saint Francisville in West Feliciana Parish, Broadwater is a 1995 graduate of Southern Baptist-affiliated Louisiana College in Pineville. In 1998, he graduated in 1998 from the New Orleans Baptist Theological Seminary. In 2002, he received his Juris Doctor from the Louisiana State University Law Center in Baton Rouge.

Broadwater and his wife, the former Hilaria Nelson, originally from Franklinton in Washington Parish have three daughters — Emma Grace, Rose Kathron, and Maggie Frances. The Broadwaters are members of First Presbyterian Church of Hammond.

== Career ==
Broadwater listed the key campaign issues in 2011 as economic development and education. He claimed that his private sector experience and his work as the former director of the office of workers compensation would give him an early advantage as a legislator. Broadwater promised to pursue a balanced state budget. As the former head of a state agency, he developed and managed a $62 million departmental budget during the first term of Governor Bobby Jindal.

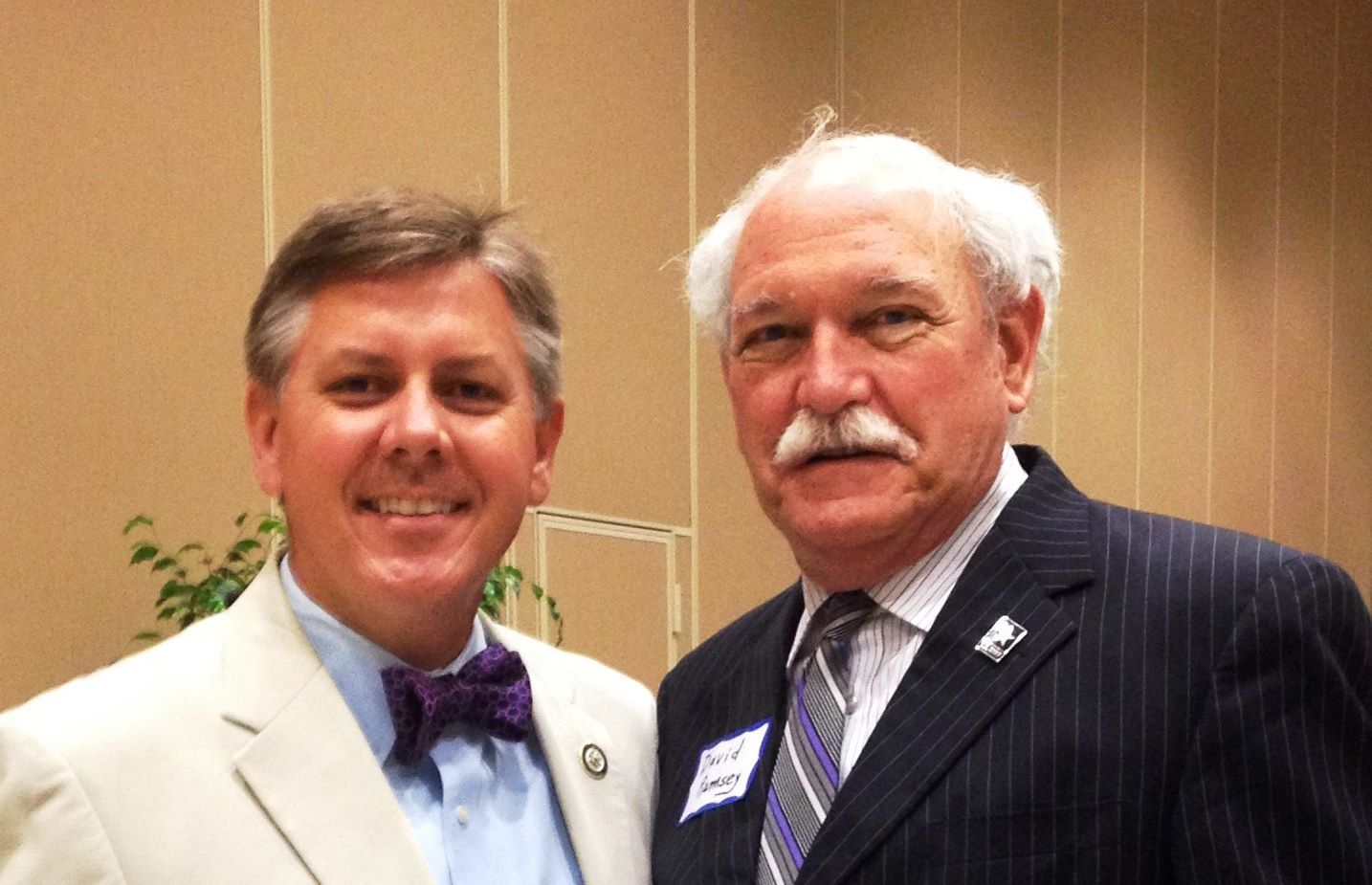
Louisiana Representative (House District 86) Chris Broadwater (left) on June 4, 2014, with Tangipahoa Parish Board of Election Supervisors member David Ramsey at a reception for legislators hosted by the Hammond Chamber of Commerce in Southeastern Louisiana University's War Memorial Student Union.

Broadwater won the seat vacated by the term-limited Speaker Jim Tucker in a low-turnout general election held on November 19, 2011. Tucker himself ran unsuccessfully for Louisiana Secretary of State but lost to incumbent Tom Schedler. District 86 had been relocated after the 2010 United States census. The "District 86" represented by Tucker was south of Lake Pontchartrain, but Broadwater's constituency was entirely north of the Lake. (The area south of the Lake had lost population because of Hurricane Katrina.)

At the end of the special legislative session in June 2017, Broadwater secured House support without a single dissenting vote on the resolution introduced by state Senator Rick Ward, III, of Port Allen in West Baton Rouge Parish, which implores lawmakers to act in a more civil fashion toward one another, not to let partisanship and political views sour personal relations with colleagues. "There are always a lot of heated discussions, but it seems to me like we're moving away from philosophical disagreements on issues and getting personal," Ward said. Republican U.S. Representative Mike Johnson of Louisiana's 4th congressional district, who is a former member of the state House of Representatives, expressed a similar view in a document which he wrote as a congressional freshman.

Statewide radio talk show host Moon Griffon has been sharply critical of what he claims is Broadwater's largely Democratic political philosophy, having called Broadwater a "fiscal fool." Though the lawmaker is a registered Republican, he has been conciliatory to policies advanced by Governor John Bel Edwards.

Broadwater has previous experience with the Louisiana Workforce Commission. In March 2018, he was named vice president of workforce policy for the Louisiana Community and Technical College System.

Louisiana House of Representatives
Preceded by Jim Tucker	Louisiana State Representative for District 86 (Tangipahoa Parish); Christopher D. "Chris" Broadwater; 2012–	Succeeded by Incumbent
