= Walker Hines (politician) =

American politician

Member of the Louisiana House of Representatives from the 95th district
- In office January 14, 2008 – January 9, 2012
- Preceded by: Alexander Heaton
- Succeeded by: Sherman Q. Mack

Personal details
- Party: Democratic; Republican
- Website: walkerhines.com

Walker Hines is an American politician. He served as a Democratic member for the 95th district of the Louisiana House of Representatives.

In 2008, Hines won the election for the 95th district of the Louisiana House of Representatives. He succeeded Alexander Heaton. In November 2010, Hines became a Republican member. In 2012, he was succeeded by Sherman Q. Mack for the 95th district.

Hines once talked at Tulane University, in which he talked about being the youngest elected member of the Louisiana State Legislature and other topics.
