= Chris Turner (Louisiana politician) =

American politician

Christopher Turner is an American politician from the state of Louisiana. A Republican, he represents the 12th district in the Louisiana House of Representatives.

Turner is from Ruston, Louisiana. He won a special election in February 2019 to succeed Robert Shadoin in the Louisiana House.
