= Kenny Ray Cox =

American politician (born 1957)

Member of the Louisiana House of Representatives
- In office 2011–2023
- Preceded by: Rick Nowlin
- Succeeded by: Shaun Raphael Mena
- Constituency: District 23

Personal details
- Party: Democratic

Kenny Ray Cox (born October 2, 1957) is an American politician from Louisiana. He represented District 23 in the Louisiana House of Representatives from 2011 to 2023 as a Democrat.

Alongside the rest of the members of the Louisiana Legislative Black Caucus, Kenny Ray Cox endorsed Hillary Clinton's campaign in the 2016 United States presidential election.
