= Capitol High School (Louisiana) =

School in Louisiana, US

Coordinates: 30.4591°N 91.1642°W

Location
- 1000 N. 23rd Street; Baton Rouge, East Baton Rouge Parish, Louisiana 70802; United States

Information
- School type: Public secondary
- Opened: 1950
- School district: RSD-Capitol Education Foundation
- NCES School ID: 220031502469
- Principal: Rhonda Irwin
- Teaching staff: 26.01 (FTE)
- Enrollment: 259 (2023-2024)
  - Grade 9: 78
  - Grade 10: 63
  - Grade 11: 61
  - Grade 12: 57
- Student to teacher ratio: 9.96
- Colors: Red and gold
- Mascot: Lion
- Nickname: Golden Lions
- Yearbook: Golden Lion
- Website: ebrschools.org/schools/capitolhigh/

Capitol High School is a public high school named after the Louisiana State Capitol in Baton Rouge, Louisiana.

== History ==
Capitol Junior - Senior High School opened in 1950 as the second public secondary school for African Americans in the city. The school's campus on 40 acres (16 hectares) was designed by Baton Rouge architect A. Hays Town. In 1959, the high school and middle school split, and the middle school remained in the original building. The Capitol Senior High School building was constructed in 1960.

The state took control of the Capitol High in 2008, citing low performance. Capitol High School became part of the RSD-Capitol Education Foundation. A plan to make it a KIPP school for the 2022-2023 school year fell through. Local control as part of the East Baton Rouge Parish School System returned during the 2023-2024 school year.

== Demographics ==
Capitol High's student body was 94.7% African American in 2024, and 71% of students are "economically disadvantaged". The school's test scores are very low.

Scorecard
Mathematics proficiency	2%
Reading proficiency	13%
Science proficiency	0%
Graduation rate	64%
Source:U.S. News & World Report

== School newspaper ==
The Leader newspaper is the school newspaper.

== Athletics ==
Capitol High athletics competes in the LHSAA. Lions are the school mascot and the school colors are red and gold.

=== Championships ===
- (1) L.I.A.L.O. Football State Championship: 1955

=== Football ===
In 2022, Johnathan Brantley was announced as head football coach.

== Alumni ==
- Seimone Augustus, WNBA basketball player
- Brandon Bass, NBA basketball player
- Terrance Broadway, football player
- Oliver Lafayette, NBA basketball player
- C. Denise Marcelle, state legislator
- Barbara Carpenter, state legislator
- Alfred C. Williams, state legislator
- Sidney Thornton, football player who was on two Super Bowl winning teams
