= Robert Shadoin =

American politician

Member of the Louisiana House of Representatives from the 12th district
- In office January 9, 2012 – October 7, 2018
- Preceded by: Hollis Downs
- Succeeded by: Christopher Turner

Personal details
- Born: August 24, 1953 (age 72)
- Party: Republican

Robert "Rob" Shadoin (born August 24, 1953) is an American politician. He is a former member of the Louisiana House of Representatives for District 12 before he resigned in September 2018.
