= Aimee Adatto Freeman =

American politician from Louisiana

Member of the Louisiana House of Representatives from the 98th district
- Incumbent
- Assumed office January 13, 2020
- Preceded by: Neil Abramson

Personal details
- Born: New Orleans, Louisiana
- Party: Democratic
- Spouse: West
- Children: 4
- Education: Tulane University (MBA); University of Virginia (BA)
- Occupation: Business consultant

Aimee Adatto Freeman is an American politician and business consultant serving as a member of the Louisiana House of Representatives from the 98th district. Elected in November 2019, she assumed office on January 13, 2020, succeeding Neil Abramson.

== Background ==
Freeman earned a Bachelor of Arts in English: American Studies from the University of Virginia and a Master of Business Administration in Marketing from the A.B. Freeman School of Business at the Tulane University. She worked as a business consultant before entering politics.

Freeman ran for the Louisiana House in the 2019 Louisiana elections. She came first in the nonpartisan primary election in October 2019 and defeated attorney Kea Sherman in the November run-off election. She assumed office on January 13, 2020. Freeman sits on the Appropriations Committee, the House Education Committee, the House Retirement Committee and the Joint Legislative Budget Committee.

== Exgternal links ==
- Official website
- Profile on Ballotpedia
