= Shane Mack (politician) =

American politician

Member of the Louisiana House of Representatives from the 95th district
- Incumbent
- Assumed office January 8, 2024
- Preceded by: Sherman Q. Mack

Personal details
- Party: Republican
- Education: Southeastern Louisiana University (BS)
- Occupation: Logistics manager

Shane Mack is an American politician serving as a member of the Louisiana House of Representatives from the 95th district. A member of the Republican Party, Mack represents parts of Livingston Parish and Tangipahoa Parish and has been in office since January 8, 2024.
