= Taylor Barras =

American politician

Speaker of the Louisiana House of Representatives
- In office January 11, 2016 – January 13, 2020
- Preceded by: Chuck Kleckley
- Succeeded by: Clay Schexnayder

Member of the Louisiana House of Representatives from the 48th district
- In office January 14, 2008 – January 13, 2020
- Preceded by: Romo Romero
- Succeeded by: Beau Beaullieu

Personal details
- Born: Taylor Francis Barras; January 1957 (age 69) New Iberia, Louisiana, U.S.
- Party: Democratic (Before 2011); Republican (2011–present)
- Spouse: Cheryl Lopez
- Education: Louisiana State University, Baton Rouge (BS)

Taylor Francis Barras (born January 1957) is an American accountant and banker who served as a Republican member of the Louisiana House of Representatives for the 48th district, based in Iberia Parish. On January 11, 2016, as he began his third term in the chamber, Barras was elected House speaker by his colleagues, who in what was considered a political upset on the second ballot rejected Representative Walt Leger, III, of New Orleans, the choice of incoming Democratic governor John Bel Edwards.

== Early life and education ==
A New Iberia native, Barras is the third of four children of Mazel Borel Barras and Elton Joseph Barras, a decorated United States Army first lieutenant in World War II, who operated a country grocery store from 1951 until 1969 and was then from 1969 to 1983 the chief deputy under Iberia Parish Tax Assessor Clegg J. LaBauve, Sr.. The senior Barras was elected to succeed LaBauve as tax assessor in 1983; he handily defeated Erland "Ticky" LaBauve and held the position from 1984 until his retirement in December 2000.

Taylor Barras graduated in 1975 from New Iberia Senior High School. In 1979, he received a Bachelor of Science degree in accounting from Louisiana State University in Baton Rouge.

== Career ==
Barras is market president of Iberia Bank. He is married to the former Cheryl Lopez. In 2011, Barras became one of several members to switch to Republican Party affiliation.

In his first term, Barras served on the House and Governmental Affairs Committee Municipal, Parochial and Cultural Affairs Committee, Ways and Means Committee, and Joint Legislative Committee on Capital Outlay.

=== Role as speaker ===
Barras predicted no shortcuts to the reconciliation of the state budget, the first agenda item in the special legislative session set for mid-February. "None of the choices are easy or ideal, but we have to face them," Barras said.

When Governor John Bel Edwards' proposed increase in the state gasoline tax failed in the House in 2017, key supporters of the governor questioned the effectiveness of Barras' leadership. The Louisiana Republican Party and conservatives in the state House, however, rallied to Barras' defense on the premise that without Barras' leadership, the tax increase may have succeeded. It required a supermajority of seventy votes in the chamber. In a June 1 editorial, the Lafayette Daily Advertiser even called upon Barras to resign: "It may be no one could lead these 105 elected representatives, but Barras has proven he cannot. Barras is a good man but a bad speaker." Ken Naquin, the chief executive officer of Louisiana Associated General Contractors, referred to "the toxic mix that is the House of Representatives as it exists today [with] the total lack of leadership in the House." Naquin said that "in reality" there are three House Speakers, including Barras, Lance Harris of Alexandria, the chairman of the House Republican Caucus, and Cameron Henry of Metairie, the chairman of the House Appropriations Committee. Harris disputed Naquin's observation and said that Barras is "doing an awesome job."

In July 2017, Governor Edwards sent Barras a letter asking the speaker to formulate his own plan for closing an estimated $1.3 billion budget shortfall for 2018. "If you remain unwilling to undertake comprehensive budget and tax reform, please identify your plan to solve the looming fiscal cliff," Edwards wrote. The governor said that he will not call a second special session to address fiscal matters unless bipartisan solutions are advanced: "At a cost of roughly $60,000 per day, it would be irresponsible to make Louisiana's taxpayers foot the bill for another special session without a firm commitment to act from the House," Edwards wrote.

Lanny Keller, a journalist for The Advocate, wrote in reference to Barras's retirement as speaker that the lawmaker, a compromise choice for the top position, is "a nice guy. But unfortunately, he's been a failure in many ways as speaker, and one who left the House as an institution in far worse shape than he found it. The budget process is a mess, and Barras bears a large share of the responsibility. Some of that is direct and personal, because as a member of the numbers-crunching Revenue Estimating Conference, he blocked ordinary and reasonable budget forecasts in recent months."

== See also ==
- List of American politicians who switched parties in office

Louisiana House of Representatives
Preceded by Romo Romero	Member of the Louisiana House of Representatives for the 48th district 2008–2020	Succeeded by Beau Beaullieu
Political offices
Preceded by Chuck Kleckley	Speaker of the Louisiana House of Representatives; 2016–2020	Succeeded by Clay Schexnayder
