= Scott Simon (politician) =

American architect

Scott Michael Simon, Sr.

Member of the Louisiana House of Representatives from the 74th district
- Incumbent
- Assumed office January 14, 2008
- Preceded by: Mike Strain

Personal details
- Born: June 1961 (age 65)
- Party: Republican
- Spouse: Connie Simon
- Education: Tulane University
- Profession: Residential Designer

Scott Michael Simon, Sr. (born June 1961), is a residential designer from Abita Springs, Louisiana, who is a Republican member of the Louisiana House of Representatives from District 74.

Simon is a residential/commercial designer and planner. He received his Master of Arts in Architecture from Tulane University in New Orleans. Simon is a member of the Louisiana Rural Caucus. First elected in 2007, he took office in 2008 to succeed current Louisiana Commissioner of Agriculture and Forestry Mike Strain. Simon was re-elected in 2011.

== Political experience ==
Simon has had the following political experience:

- Louisiana state representative, 2008–present
- President, Jaycees Bridge City Council

== Current legislative committees ==
Simon has been a member of the:

- Health and Welfare, Chair

== Caucuses/Non-Legislative committees ==
Simon has been a member of:

- Freshman Caucus
- Northshore Federation Legislative Caucus

== Professional experience ==
Simon has had the following professional experience:

- Residential/Commercial Designer and Planner
- President, Jaycees Bridge City Council

== Organizations ==
Simon has been a member of the following organizations:

- Member, Governors Office of Disability Affairs
- Member, New Heights Therapy Riding Center
- Member, Families Helping Families
- Member, TARC
- UBoard Member, St Jane de Chantal
- Youth Director, St Jane de Chantal Youth Director
- Member, St. Tammany Home Builders Association
- Member, Northshore Republican Men's Club
- Member, West St. Tammany Chamber of Commerce
- Member, West St. Tammany FFA Alumni Association
- Sponsor, Friends of Scouting
- Adult Leader, Boy Scouts of America Troop 610
- Sponsor, Northshore Cajun Dancer
- President, Abita Springs Elementary PTO
- Fundraiser and Builder, CJ Finn Ball Park
- President, Abita Springs Recreation District 11
- Coordinator, Youth Mission Work
- Coordinator, St. Jane de Chantal CYO
- Member, St. Jane de Chantal Parish Pastoral Council

== Committee assignments ==
- Agriculture, Forestry, Aquaculture and Rural Development
- Commerce
- Health and Welfare

Louisiana House of Representatives
Preceded by Mike Strain	Louisiana House of Representatives (District 74); 2008–present	Succeeded by Incumbent
