= Clay Schexnayder =

American politician

Speaker of the Louisiana House of Representatives
- In office January 13, 2020 – January 8, 2024
- Preceded by: Taylor Barras
- Succeeded by: Phillip DeVillier

Member of the Louisiana House of Representatives from the 81st district
- In office January 9, 2012 – January 8, 2024
- Preceded by: John LaBruzzo
- Succeeded by: Jeffrey Wiley

Personal details
- Born: Clay John Schexnayder; February 25, 1969 (age 57)
- Party: Republican

Clay John Schexnayder (/ʃeɪksˈniːdər/; born February 25, 1969) is an American businessman and politician from Ascension Parish, Louisiana. A Republican, he has served as a member of the Louisiana House of Representatives from 2012 to 2024, and as speaker of the House from 2020 to 2024.

== Early life and education ==
Schexnayder is the son of Perry P. Schexnayder and the former Dorothy Ann Demars (1937–2009). His grandfather Harold "Pocahontas" Schexnayder was a longtime Louisiana Department of Wildlife and Fisheries game warden, and he spent much of his childhood in the Maurepas Swamp area.

In 1989, Schexnayder graduated from French Settlement High School. Two years later, he graduated from the Allen Institute in Atlanta, Georgia, where he trained as an automotive mechanic.

== Career before politics ==
In 1998, Schexnayder opened Car Craft and Rubber Company Automotive, in Sorrento, a town in Ascension Parish, and has operated the business since that time. On the side, he was a racecar driver, participating in races from 1997 to 2013 on the competition circuit in Louisiana, Mississippi, and Arkansas.

== Political career ==
=== State House tenure before speakership (2012–2019) ===
Schexnayder was first elected to the Louisiana House of Representatives in 2011 from District 81, which encompasses parts of four parishes: Livingston, Ascension, St. James, and St. John the Baptist.

In 2016, Schexnayder sponsored legislation to repeal Louisiana's motorcycle helmet law, making it legal for motorcyclists ages 21 and up to ride motorcycles without head protection; the bill failed to pass on a 48–32 vote, falling short of the 53 votes required for the bill to advance.

In 2016, Schexnayder was named to the executive committee of the Louisiana Legislative Rural Caucus for the 2016–2017 term.

As chairman of the House Agriculture Committee, Schexnayder opposed a bill in 2018 to allow florists to work without passing a 40-question licensing exam. Louisiana is the only state that requires occupational licensing for florists. The bill, introduced by Representative Julie Emerson, was supported by Governor John Bel Edwards, and was supported by various organizations favoring occupational-licensing reform, such as Institute for Justice and Americans for Prosperity. Schexnayder defended the florist-licensure requirement, framing it as a consumer-protection measure. Despite Schexnayder's opposition, the bill passed the House committee on an 8–6 vote. However, it failed in the state Senate.

In 2019, Schexnayder sponsored legislation to permit and regulate industrial hemp cultivation in the state, and to authorize licensed retailers to sell hemp-derived products, including cannabidiol (CBD oil); The bill passed the legislature and was signed into law by Governor Edwards.

=== Speaker of the state House (2020–2024) ===
In January 2020, Schexnayder won the post of speaker of the House after some Democrats supported him, while most of the Republican representatives supported a different candidate for the post, Livingston Republican Sherman Mack. In the House floor vote, Schexnayder defeated Mack, 60–45, thus surpassing the 53 votes needed to win the speakership. Schexnayder won by winning the votes of all 35 House Democrats; 23 of the House Republicans; and two representatives with no party affiliation. The other 45 Republicans voted for Mack.

The vote occurred after days of intense negotiations between Mack and Schexnayder, which eventually broke down. Mack was officially endorsed by the House Republican caucus in a December 2019 vote, and the most powerful Louisiana Republicans (such as U.S. Senator John Kennedy, state Attorney General Jeff Landry and megadonor Lane Grigsby), including the members most hostile to Democratic Governor John Bel Edwards, supported Mack's candidacy Edwards urged Democratic representatives to support Schexnayder, and the Republicans who backed Schexnayder generally came from a more moderate wing of the party. Thus, although Republicans were in a strong position in the Louisiana Legislature (holding a two-thirds supermajority in the state Senate and being two votes shy of a supermajority in the state House), the split in the Republican Party allowed Democrats to retain a measure of influence within the legislature. In exchange for their support, Schexnayder allocated some committee chairmanships to Democrats, although Republicans retained decisive majorities on all committees.

In May 2021, Schexnayder supported a police reform bill, which passed the House on a 53–42 vote. The bill, backed by the Louisiana Legislative Black Caucus, proposed new limits on qualified immunity, a doctrine that bars some victims from obtaining relief in court for police misconduct; it was the outcome of a compromise reached by a task force convened to address police misconduct. However, the bill failed to advance in the Senate.

House Republicans have 68 seats in the state House, short of the 70 votes needed to override a veto. In 2021, after Governor Edwards vetoed 28 bills from the previous legislative session, Schexnayder called a veto session, the first such session since Louisiana's current constitution was adopted in 1974. During the session, Republicans sought to override two of Edwards' vetoes: a veto of a bill to ban transgender girls from participating in school sports, and a veto of a bill allowing the carrying of concealed handguns without a permit, safety training, or background check. Both attempts failed: almost all House Democrats voted to sustain the vetoes, and without Democratic or independent support, Republicans failed to obtain sufficient votes to override the vetoes Schexnayder retaliated by ousting two different Democrats from committee chairmanships (Chad Brown was removed from the chairmanship of the House Insurance Committee and Vincent Pierre from the chairmanship of the Transportation Committee) and replacing them with Republicans. The move left Republicans holding the chairmanship of 13 regular subject-matter committees, and Democrats holding the chairmanship of 3 committees. Schexnayder also ousted Roy Daryl Adams, a no party affiliation member, from a seat on the House Appropriations Committee, and ousted Democrat C. Travis Johnson from his seat on the Transportation Committee. Democrats opposed Schexnayder's decision, but continued to support him as speaker.

In 2021, Schexnayder ousted Representative Ray Garofalo from his chairmanship of the House Education Committee as part of an intra-party Republican feud over Garofalo's support for a bill that would ban public schools or colleges from teaching that the U.S. or the State of Louisiana is "systematically racist or sexist" and ban the provision of information that "promotes divisive concepts." This bill was similar to bills pushed by Republicans in other states. Schexnayder asked Garofalo not to move the bill forward, but Garofalo did so anyway. Republican Mark Wright the vice chairman of the committee, became chair in Garofalo's place.

Schexnayder pushed legislation to extend Louisiana's movie production incentives for an additional eight years; the bill passed in 2023.

=== Campaign for secretary of state ===
In 2023, Schexnayder publicly considered a potential run for governor. In April 2023, after Louisiana Secretary of State Kyle Ardoin announced he would not seek reelection, Schexnayder announced he would run for the position, and said he had raised $900,000 for his campaign. He finished fourth in the jungle primary, with 14.69% of the vote.

== Personal life ==
Schexnayder and his wife, Phoebe (née Keller), have four children and several grandchildren.

Louisiana House of Representatives
Preceded by John LaBruzzo	Member of the Louisiana House of Representatives from the 81st district 2012–2024	Succeeded by Jeffrey Wiley
Political offices
Preceded by Taylor Barras	Speaker of the Louisiana House of Representatives; 2020–2024	Succeeded by Phillip DeVillier
