= Frank Howard (Louisiana politician) =

American law enforcement officer and politician (1938–2020)

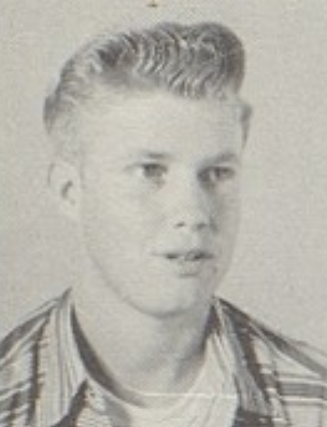
- Howard in 1956

Member of the Louisiana House of Representatives from the 24th district
- In office January 15, 2008 – January 13, 2020
- Preceded by: Joe R. Salter
- Succeeded by: Rodney Schamerhorn

Sheriff of Vernon Parish, Louisiana
- In office July 1, 1976 – June 30, 2000
- Succeeded by: Sam Craft

Personal details
- Born: Frank Alden Howard; December 1, 1938 Hornbeck, Louisiana, U.S.
- Died: July 27, 2020 (aged 81) Alexandria, Louisiana, U.S.
- Cause of death: COVID-19
- Party: Democratic (before 2007); Republican (2007–2020)
- Spouse(s): Pauline Cavanaugh (m. 1961; died 2015) Macel McInnis Anderson (m. 2017)
- Children: 4

Military service
- Allegiance: United States
- Branch/service: United States Army
- Years of service: 1961–1963
- Unit: 49th Armored Division
- Battles/wars: Cuban Missile Crisis

Frank Alden "Frankie" Howard (December 1, 1938 – July 26, 2020) was an American law enforcement officer and politician who served as a member of the Louisiana House of Representatives from 2008 to 2020. Prior to his service in the state legislature, he served as the deputy sheriff in Vernon Parish, Louisiana, and later as sheriff from 1976 to 2000.

Howard was born in Hornbeck, Louisiana, and received his education at the National Sheriffs' Institute at the University of California, Los Angeles and Louisiana State University during the 1970s. He entered politics with his appointment as Town Marshal of Hornbeck to fill the vacancy created by his father's death and later his appointment as deputy sheriff. In 1976, he won election as the Vernon Parish, Louisiana which he would serve as until 2000. In 2007, he won election to the Louisiana House of Representatives and served until he was term limited in 2020.

== Early life and education ==
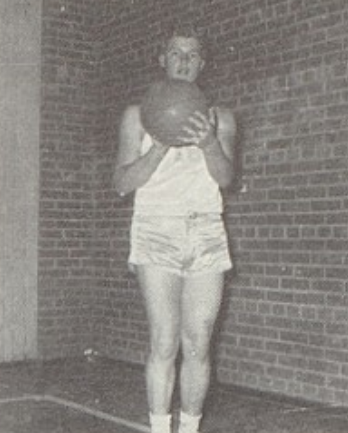
Frank Howard while on the basketball team in high school

Frank Alden Howard was born on December 1, 1938, in Hornbeck, Louisiana, to Robert Howard and Essie Brown. From November 1961 to November 1963, he served in the United States Army and was assigned in the 49th Armored Division.

He graduated from Hornbeck High School and attended the National Sheriffs' Institute at the University of California, Los Angeles, in 1978. He later took continuing education courses at Louisiana State University.

== Career ==
=== Alderman ===
In 1966, Howard was elected as a member of the city council in Hornbeck, Louisiana.

=== Law enforcement ===
==== Elections ====
In June 1975, Howard resigned as deputy sheriff to run for sheriff of Vernon Parish and announced that he would run on July 27. Howard placed first in the jungle primary, and ran unopposed in the general election after his competitor, Bert A. Adams withdrew from the election on November 10. He took office on July 1, 1976, and was a member of the Democratic Party.

In 1979, Howard placed first ahead of six candidates in the jungle primary and defeated Oscar Haymon in the general election. During the 1983 elections he ran for reelection unopposed. In 1987, he defeated Scotty McCloud, a former member of the Louisiana State Police who commanded Troop H. During the 1991 elections he ran for reelection unopposed. In 1995, he defeated Teresa Rushing Miller.

In 1999, Howard announced that he would not seek reelection and would not run for a seat in the Louisiana Senate against incumbent Democratic Senator David Cain. He was succeeded by Sam Craft.

==== Tenure ====
In 1960, Howard was appointed to serve as the Town Marshal of Hornbeck to fill the vacancy created by his father's death. In 1961, Howard became the deputy sheriff in Vernon Parish, Louisiana, and served for 15 years.

In 1976, Howard and nineteen other attorneys, law enforcement agents, mayors, and judges were appointed to the Red River Delta Law Enforcement Planning Council.

From 1978 to 1979, Howard created a deficit in the police department of $70,536 after spending $811,559 against the existing $53,023 surplus and the $687,499 in funding. From 1979 to 1980, the deficit rose to $157,811 after $843,647 was spent against $815,623 in funding. Howard was criticized for his expense report being three months late and was advised to prepare formal budgets to prevent further deficits. In 1988, Joe Burris, the legislative auditor, criticized Howard for not complying with state laws for seizure and sale of movable property to collect delinquent taxes, but Howard claimed that there were no delinquent taxes.

On September 24, 1978, a lawsuit was filed on behalf of Louisiana Fire Marshal Daniel L. Kelly requesting for the Vernon Parish jail to be closed for unsafe conditions and accusing Howard and the Vernon Parish Police Jury of failing to comply with orders issued on July 12, 1979. However, on October 3, Judge Ted Broyles, of the 30th Judicial District, dismissed the case and the Vernon Parish Policy Jury stated that the fire marshal had taken "a shot at the sheriff with a politically motivated suit".

In June 1980, Dallas Gene Hayes was arrested at his place of work and was later fired the next day for the incident. On March 26, 1981, Hayes filed a civil rights lawsuit for $105,000 in damages against Howard and James Bosley claiming that Title 42 of the Civil Rights Act had been violated as he was arrested without an arrest warrant, not given his Miranda warning, and was forced to take a polygraph test. However, Howard and Bosely claimed that Hayes had come to the sheriff's office on his own, that he was given a voice-stress analyzer and not a polygraph, that he had been given an arrest and Miranda warning, and that Howard had not known of the incident. On October 14, U.S. District Judge Nauman Scott dismissed the case against Howard, but not the case against Bosely.

From 1996 to 1997, Howard served as the Second Vice President of the Louisiana Sheriff Association and later as the First Vice President from 1998 to 1999. From 1999 to 2000, he served as president of the association.

=== State legislature ===
==== Elections ====
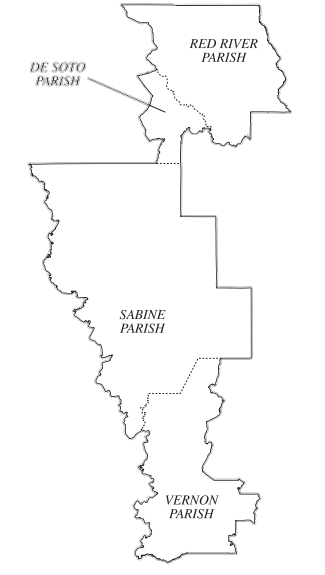
The 24th district in the Louisiana House of Representatives during Frank Howard's tenure

In 2007, Howard ran for the 24th district in the Louisiana House of Representatives as a Republican. He placed first in the primary ahead of Mary Ann Wiggins and defeated her in the general election. In 2015, he defeated Rodney Schamerhorn in the jungle primary.

In 2019, Howard was unable to seek reelection due to term limits. Rodney Schamerhorn was elected to succeed him and took office on January 13, 2020.

==== Tenure ====
During the 2008–2010 session of the Louisiana House of Representatives, Howard served on the Transportation, Agriculture, and Criminal Justice committees. By 2016, he was the oldest sitting member of the House of Representatives.

In 2008, Howard voted against legislation that would increase the salaries of members of the Louisiana State Legislature. The Criminal Justice committee voted 11 to four, with Howard voting against, in favor of legislation that would allow college students to have concealed carry weapons on campus. In 2012, the Louisiana House of Representatives voted 61 to 41, with Howard in favor, in favor of legislation that would create statewide school vouchers and increase the number of charter schools.

== Personal life and death ==
In 1961, Howard married Betty Pauline Cavanaugh, with whom he had three children. Betty died in July 2015, and he remarried to Macel McInnis Anderson in 2017.

Howard died from complications of COVID-19 in Alexandria, Louisiana, on July 26, 2020, at the age of 81, during the COVID-19 pandemic in Louisiana. Upon Howard's death, Governor John Bel Edwards released a tribute to Howard and ordered flags to be flown at half-staff at the Louisiana State Capitol and other state buildings.

== Electoral history ==
1966 Hornbeck, Louisiana, alderman election
Party	Candidate	Votes	%
Nonpartisan	Frank Howard	161	19.26%
Nonpartisan	H. G. Herring	141	16.87%
Nonpartisan	Bobbie G. Dowden (incumbent)	137	16.39%
Nonpartisan	A. L. Brooks	136	16.27%
Nonpartisan	Jack Malone (runoff)	114	13.64%
Nonpartisan	Kenneth Baggs (runoff)	98	11.72%
Nonpartisan	Cobrun Baggs (incumbent)	49	5.86%
Total votes		836	100.00%

1979 Sheriff of Vernon Parish, Louisiana election
Primary election
Party	Candidate	Votes	%
Nonpartisan	Frank A. Howard (incumbent)	5,523	44.22%
Nonpartisan	Oscar Haymon	1,896	15.18%
Nonpartisan	Malcolm Smart	1,693	13.55%
Nonpartisan	Jodie Dowden	1,257	10.06%
Nonpartisan	P.W. Hilton	1,039	8.32%
Nonpartisan	Allen Dale Turner	790	6.32%
Nonpartisan	Lewis M. Smith	293	2.35%
Total votes		12,491	100.00%
General election
Nonpartisan	Frank A. Howard (incumbent)	7,135	57.72%
Nonpartisan	Oscar Haymon	5,226	42.28%
Total votes		12,361	100.00%

1995 Sheriff of Vernon Parish, Louisiana, jungle primary
Party	Candidate	Votes	%
Nonpartisan	Frank A. Howard (incumbent)	9,373	76.71%
Nonpartisan	Teresa Rushing Miller	2,845	23.29%
Total votes		12,218	100.00%

2007 Louisiana House of Representatives 24th district election
Primary election
Party	Candidate	Votes	%
Republican	Frank Howard (incumbent)	4,442	31.01%
Democratic	Mary Ann Wiggins	3,968	27.70%
Democratic	Dean Crittenden	3,492	24.38%
Democratic	Randy" Sandel	2,422	16.91%
Total votes		14,324	100.00%
General election
Republican	Frank Howard (incumbent)	4,333	52.64%
Democratic	Mary Ann Wiggins	3,898	47.36%
Total votes		8,231	100.00%

2015 Louisiana House of Representatives 24th district jungle primary
Party	Candidate	Votes	%
Republican	Frank Howard (incumbent)	7,274	58.74%
Republican	Rodney Schamerhorn	5,109	41.26%
Total votes		12,383	100.00%

== See also ==
- Reggie Bagala, sitting member of the Louisiana House of Representatives who died from complications of COVID-19
