= 2011 Louisiana elections =

Louisiana's 2011 state elections were held on October 22, 2011, with runoff elections held on November 19. All statewide elected offices were up, as well as all seats in the Louisiana State Legislature.

== Statewide offices ==
=== Governor ===
Parishes won by Gubernatorial candidates in the October 22, 2011 election. Jindal: 30–40% 40–50% 50–60% 60–70% 70–80% 80–90%

Incumbent Governor Bobby Jindal, a Republican, ran for a second term, and faced only token opposition. He was expected to win by a wide margin, and ended up winning with nearly 66% of the vote.

=== Lieutenant governor ===
Parishes won by Lieutenant Gubernatorial candidates in the October 22, 2011 election. Jay Dardenne Billy Nungesser Jr.

Incumbent Lieutenant Governor Jay Dardenne was elected in a 2010 special election, and was elected to a full term. His opponent was Republican Billy Nungesser Jr., the Plaquemines Parish president.

==== Results ====
Unofficial results from the Secretary of State website.

2011 Louisiana Lieutenant Governor election
Party	Candidate	Votes	%	±%
Republican	Jay Dardenne (incumbent)	504,228	53.1	
Republican	Billy Nungesser Jr.	444,750	46.9	
Turnout		948,978		

=== Attorney General ===
Parishes won by Attorney General candidates in the October 22, 2011 election. Buddy Caldwell

Incumbent Attorney General Buddy Caldwell was elected as a Democrat in 2007, but switched parties in early 2011. Former Congressman Joseph Cao, also a Republican, filed to run against Caldwell, but dropped out of the race shortly after, leaving Caldwell unopposed.

=== Commissioner of Agriculture and Forestry ===
Incumbent Commissioner Michael G. Strain, a Republican, was first elected in 2007. He faced Democrat Jamie LaBranche, an arborist and horticulturist, and Reform Party candidate Belinda "B" Alexandrenko, a three-time gubernatorial candidate. He was re-elected with 66.5% of the vote.

==== Results ====
Unofficial results from the Secretary of State website.

Results by parish Strain: 40–50%; 50–60%; 60–70%; 70–80%; 80–90%; LaBranche: 50–60%

2011 Louisiana Commissioner of Agriculture and Forestry election
Party	Candidate	Votes	%	±%
Republican	Mike Strain (incumbent)	640,631	66.5	
Democratic	Jamie LaBranche	267,576	27.8	
Reform	Belinda Alexandrenko	54,842	5.7	
Turnout		963,049		

=== Commissioner of Insurance ===
Incumbent Commissioner Jim Donelon, a Republican, was first elected in a 2006 special election. His opponent was Democrat Donald C. Hodge, an attorney, who he defeated by a 2 to 1 margin.

==== Results ====
Unofficial results from the Secretary of State website.

Parishes won by Commissioner of Insurance candidates in the October 22, 2011 election.: Donelon 50–60% 60–70% 70–80% 80–90% / Hodge 50–60%

2011 Louisiana Commissioner of Insurance election
Party	Candidate	Votes	%	±%
Republican	Jim Donelon (incumbent)	651,285	67.5	
Democratic	Donald C. Hodge	313,931	32.5	
Turnout		965,216		

=== Secretary of State ===
Parishes won by Secretary of State candidates in the October 22, 2011 election.: Schedler 50–60% 60–70% / Tucker 50–60% 60–70%

Incumbent Secretary of State Tom Schedler, a Republican, was appointed to the position following Jay Dardenne's election as Lieutenant Governor. He faced Louisiana House of Representatives Speaker Jim Tucker, also a Republican, who he narrowly defeated.

==== Results ====
Unofficial results from the Secretary of State website.

2011 Louisiana Secretary of State election
Party	Candidate	Votes	%	±%
Republican	Tom Schedler (incumbent)	449,370	50.5	
Republican	Jim Tucker	440,872	49.5	
Turnout		890,242		

=== State Treasurer ===
Results by parish Kennedy: 90–100%

Incumbent Treasurer John Neely Kennedy (first elected in 1999) was re-elected unopposed. This was his second election as Treasurer after he switched parties in 2007 from Democrat to Republican.

== State Legislature ==
=== Louisiana Senate ===
Prior to the election, Republicans held 22 seats in the Louisiana Senate, while Democrats held 17. In the jungle primary, the Republicans gained a net of two Senate seats, giving them 24 seats to the Democrats' 15 seats. All four runoffs were intraparty runoffs.

=== Louisiana House of Representatives ===
Prior to the election, the Louisiana House of Representatives consisted of 57 Republicans, 46 Democrats, 2 Independents, and one vacancy. After the jungle primary the House makeup stood at 54 Republicans, 40 Democrats, 1 Independent, and 10 to be determined in runoff elections. In the runoffs not featuring two candidates of the same party, 5 Democrats, 4 Republicans and one Independent candidate were elected, so after the runoff elections the House makeup stood at 58 Republicans, 45 Democrats and 2 Independents.
