= Chuck Kleckley =

American politician

67th Speaker of the Louisiana House of Representatives
- In office January 9, 2012 – January 11, 2016
- Preceded by: Jim Tucker
- Succeeded by: Taylor Barras

Member of the Louisiana House of Representatives from the 36th district
- In office February 16, 2005 – January 11, 2016
- Preceded by: Dan Flavin
- Succeeded by: Mark Abraham

Personal details
- Born: Charles Edward Kleckley; December 1959 (age 66) Lake Charles, Louisiana, U.S.
- Party: Republican
- Education: McNeese State University (BS)
- Occupation: Politician, Businessman

Charles "Chuck" Kleckley is an American politician who represented District 36 of the Louisiana House of Representatives from 2005 to 2016 and served as the 67th Speaker of the Louisiana House of Representatives from 2012 to 2016.

Kleckley was born in Lake Charles, Louisiana, and graduated from LaGrange High School. He earned a Bachelor of Science in Finance from McNeese State University in 1993. In recognition of his achievements and contributions, McNeese State University conferred upon him an honorary Doctor of Humane Letters degree during the 160th commencement ceremony.

Prior to his election to the Louisiana House of Representatives, Kleckley served on the Calcasieu Parish Police Jury from 2000 to 2005 and was its president in 2003. During his tenure in the House, he chaired the House Insurance Committee and was a member of numerous commissions, councils, and committees including the State Bond Commission, Revenue Estimating Conference, Joint Committee on the Budget, and Joint Capital Outlay and House Executive Committees.

Kleckley was a strong supporter of road improvements in Southwest Louisiana and worked to enhance the transportation system. He advocated for higher education, improved Louisiana’s insurance and business climate, and protected healthcare funding. He also led efforts to secure state funding for a new Health and Human Performance Education Complex at McNeese State University that opened in 2018.

In 2012, there was an attempt to recall Kleckley from office due to his support for public education reforms. The effort failed to collect enough signatures. He then asked that the Ethics Board not impose fines on the teachers for their attempt.
