= Neil Abramson (politician) =

American politician (born 1967)

Member of the Louisiana House of Representatives from the 98th district
- In office January 14, 2008 – January 13, 2020
- Preceded by: Cheryl Gray
- Succeeded by: Aimee Adatto Freeman

Personal details
- Born: Neil Charles Abramson; May 2, 1967 (age 59) New Orleans, Louisiana, U.S.
- Party: Democratic
- Spouse: Kim Abramson
- Children: 1
- Education: Dartmouth College (BA); Louisiana State University Law Center (JD)
- Occupation: Lawyer

Neil Charles Abramson (born May 2, 1967) is a former Democratic member of the Louisiana House of Representatives for the 98th district, based in his native New Orleans in Orleans Parish, Louisiana.

== Background ==
Abramson is a graduate of Episcopal High School in Baton Rouge, where he was a four sport letterman and All-State football player. He received a B.A. in Government from Dartmouth College in New Hampshire in 1989 where he played four years of college football. He received his Juris Doctor from Louisiana State University Law Center in 1992 where he finished first in his class.

He was an intern to former United States Senator J. Bennett Johnston, Jr., and former U.S. Representative Jimmy Hayes of Louisiana's 7th congressional district, since disbanded. Abramson also was a clerk to U.S. District Judge Frank J. Polozola of the United States District Court for the Middle District of Louisiana.

He currently is a litigator at the law firm Liskow & Lewis in New Orleans, Louisiana.

== Political career ==
Abramson was elected to the Louisiana House of Representatives during the 2007 general election with 74% of the vote defeating Democrat James P. Johnson. On October 22, 2011, Abramson won re-election to District 98 again with 74% of the vote after defeating Republican John French. Abramson was re-elected for a third term in 2015 without opposition.

Abramson served on the following committees during his time as Representative: Ways and Means, Civil Law and Procedure, select Committee on Hurricane Recovery, Health and Welfare, Judiciary, Joint Legislative Committee on Capital Outlay, Joint Legislative Committee on Budget, and State Bond Commission. He served as Chairman of the Committee on Ways and Means (2016–2020), and previously served as Chairman of the Joint Legislative Committee on Capital Outlay (2016–2018), Chairman of the Committee on Civil Law and Procedure (2012–2016), Chairman of the Select Committee on Hurricane Recovery (first chairman of committee), and Vice Chair of Judiciary from 2007 to 2011.

In 2012, Representative Abramson conveyed updates on Hurricane Isaac to his constituents via Twitter. In 2016, Representative Abramson was criticized by the Orleans Parish Executive Democratic Committee for his vote on the Speaker's race in 2015. The committee did not invite Abramson to the meeting, give him prior notice or hear the complete story. The committee's choice for Speaker did not have enough votes to win prior to election. Abramson supported the candidate chosen by the majority of the House of Representatives, which Abramson argued was better for his constituents and district.

== Notable legislation ==
Through his career, Abramson championed legislation seeking to improve mental health access and treatment, to stop human trafficking and to promote early childhood education. As a result, legislation authored and passed by Abramson on human trafficking, Louisiana now leads the nation with the highest grade for its human trafficking laws based on industry group assessments. Abramson also authored and passed legislation for the safety and protection of the state's youth by requiring in-service training related to suicide prevention for nonpublic and charter school teachers and other employees.

Abramson has also been focused through his legislative tenure on reforming the state's fiscal affairs. As Chairman of Ways and Means, Abramson led the way in changing the state's Capital Outlay Process, which included eliminating the previous structural deficit in that budget. Throughout Abramson's tenure, he has been an advocate for reforming the state's on-going structural deficits in its operating budget through a limited constitutional convention focused solely on fiscal matters. Stating that, "A limited state constitutional convention would allow for a comprehensive re-work of the state tax structure and state budget system as well as to restructure the current state-local financial system."

== Legislative record ==
Abramson's legislative ratings have ranged from 67 to 100 percent from the Louisiana Association of Business and Industry. In 2012, he was rated 100 percent by the National Federation of Independent Business. In 2013 and 2014, the conservative Louisiana Family Forum scored him 100 and 40 percent, respectively. Louisiana Right to Life has scored him 100 percent in his first term; no ratings are posted for his second term. In 2013 and 2014, the Louisiana Association of Educators rated him 50 percent both years.

Louisiana House of Representatives
Preceded by Cheryl Gray	Louisiana State Representative for District 98 (Orleans Parish); Neil Charles Abramson; 2008–	Succeeded by Incumbent
