= Jim Tucker (Louisiana politician) =

American politician

Speaker of the Louisiana House of Representatives
- In office January 14, 2008 – January 9, 2012
- Preceded by: Joe R. Salter
- Succeeded by: Chuck Kleckley

Member of the Louisiana House of Representatives from the 86th district
- In office 2001–2012
- Preceded by: Stephen J. Windhorst
- Succeeded by: Rodney Lyons

Personal details
- Born: James Wayne Tucker; November 11, 1964 (age 61) New Orleans, Louisiana, U.S.
- Party: Republican
- Spouse: Marisol
- Children: 2
- Education: University of New Orleans (BS)
- Profession: Investment banker, real estate developer, CEO

James Wayne Tucker (born November 11, 1964) is an American politician and businessman who served as a Republican member of the Louisiana House of Representatives, representing the 86th District from 2002 to 2012. He served as Speaker of the House from 2008 to 2012, succeeding Joe R. Salter and preceding Chuck Kleckley.

Tucker was born in New Orleans, Louisiana. He attended Louisiana State University (LSU) and later graduated from the University of New Orleans with a degree in finance.

Tucker began his career in investment banking and real estate development before entering politics.

He was first elected to the Louisiana House of Representatives in 2001, winning a special election to fill a vacancy created by the resignation of Stephen J. Windhorst. He was subsequently re-elected in 2003 and 2007 without opposition. As Speaker, he played a significant role in steering the House's legislative agenda, often opposing tax increases and supporting business-friendly policies. He was known for his efforts to convert state retirement plans for new hires from defined benefit plans to defined contribution plans, aiming for greater fiscal sustainability.

In 2011, Tucker ran for Louisiana Secretary of State but was narrowly defeated by the incumbent, Tom Schedler. Tucker received 49.53% of the vote, while Schedler secured 50.47%.

After leaving the legislature, Tucker transitioned to the business sector. In 2015, he was appointed CEO of CommCare Corp., a company managing geriatric care facilities based in New Orleans.

Tucker is married to Marisol, and they have two children. The family resides in Terrytown, Louisiana.
