= Sherman Q. Mack =

American politician and lawyer

Sherman Mack

Member of the Louisiana House of Representatives from the 95th district
- In office January 9, 2012 – January 8, 2024
- Preceded by: Walker Hines
- Succeeded by: Shane Mack

Personal details
- Born: Sherman Quinn Mack; March 1972 (age 54)
- Party: Republican
- Education: Southeastern Louisiana University (BA); Southern University, Baton Rouge (JD)

Sherman Quinn Mack (born March 1972) is a lawyer from Albany outside of Baton Rouge, Louisiana, who was a Republican member of the Louisiana House of Representatives from District 95 in Livingston Parish until January 8, 2024, when his brother Shane Mack was sworn in.

Mack was elected on October 22, 2011, to succeed Walker Hines, who held the seat for one term when it was based, prior to redistricting, in Orleans Parish. In the nonpartisan blanket primary, Mack received 6,526 votes (61.2 percent), compared to 3,449 (32.4 percent) for Democrat Lonnie Watts and 682 ballots (6.4 percent) for Independent Matthew Mitchell.

On April 5, 2012, Mack voted against successful bills to authorize charter schools and to establish a school voucher program. He also opposed the plan to amend teacher tenure policy.

Mack also works as an attorney in Livingston Parish.

Louisiana House of Representatives
Preceded by Walker Hines	Member of the Louisiana House of Representatives from the 95th district 2012–2024	Succeeded by Shane Mack
