= 2023 United States secretary of state elections =

- November 7, 2023; November 18, 2023 (Louisiana)

3 secretary of state offices (Note: Seat tallies and popular vote do not include states that do not elect secretaries of state.)
	Majority party	Minority party
Party	Republican	Democratic
Seats before	19	16
Seats after	19	16
Seat change	Steady	Steady
Popular vote	1,715,131	1,214,336
Percentage	58.54%	41.45%
Seats up	3	0
Seats won	3	0
- Republican hold No election

The 2023 United States secretary of state elections were held on November 7, 2023, in the states of Kentucky and Mississippi, with an election held in Louisiana on November 18, to elect the secretaries of state of three U.S. states. The previous elections for this group of states took place in 2019.

These elections took place concurrently with several other state and local elections.

Republicans won every seat in this election.

== Election predictions ==
Several sites and individuals published predictions of competitive seats. These predictions looked at factors such as the strength of the incumbent (if the incumbent is running for re-election), the strength of the candidates, and the partisan leanings of the state (reflected in part by the state's Cook Partisan Voting Index rating). The predictions assigned ratings to each seat, with the rating indicating a party's predicted advantage in winning that seat.

Most election predictors use:

- "tossup": no advantage
- "tilt" (used by some predictors): advantage that is not quite as strong as "lean"
- "lean": slight advantage
- "likely": significant, but surmountable, advantage
- "safe" or "solid": near-certain chance of victory

State	PVI	Incumbent	Last race	Sabato June 21, 2023	Result
Kentucky	R+16	Michael Adams	52.3% R	Likely R	Adams; 60.6% R
Louisiana	R+12	Kyle Ardoin (retiring)	66.2% R	Safe R	Landry; 66.8% R
Mississippi	R+11	Michael Watson	57.8% R	Safe R	Watson; 59.5% R

== Race summary ==
State	Attorney General	Party	First elected	Result	Candidates
Kentucky	Michael Adams	Republican	2019	Incumbent re-elected	▌ ✓ Michael Adams (Republican) 60.6%; ▌Buddy Wheatley (Democratic) 39.3%
Louisiana	Kyle Ardoin	Republican	2018 (special)	Incumbent retiring. New secretary of state elected Republican hold.	▌ ✓ Nancy Landry (Republican) 66.8%; ▌Gwen Collins-Greenup (Democratic) 33.2%
Mississippi	Michael Watson	Republican	2019	Incumbent re-elected	▌ ✓ Michael Watson (Republican) 59.5%; ▌Ty Pinkins (Democratic) 40.5%

== Kentucky ==
2023 Kentucky Secretary of State election
- November 7, 2023
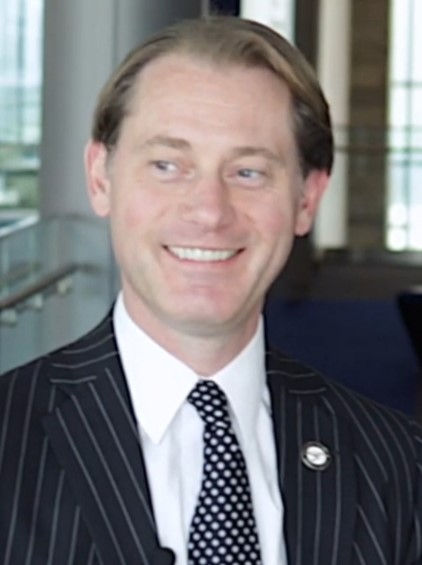

Nominee	Michael Adams	Buddy Wheatley
Party	Republican	Democratic
Popular vote	787,198	510,743
Percentage	60.6%	39.3%
- Adams: 50–60% 60–70% 70–80% 80–90% Wheatley: 50–60% 60–70% 70–80%
Secretary of State before election
Michael Adams
Republican
Elected Secretary of State
Michael Adams
Republican

Incumbent secretary of state Michael Adams ran and won re-election to a second term after he defeated Democratic nominee Buddy Wheatley with 60.6% of the vote.

Republican primary results
Party	Candidate	Votes	%
Republican	Michael Adams	171,288	63.9
Republican	Stephen Knipper	70,993	26.5
Republican	Allen Maricle	25,772	9.6
Total votes		268,053	100

2023 Kentucky Secretary of State election
Party	Candidate	Votes	%	±%
Republican	Michael Adams (incumbent)	783,695	60.59%	+8.33%
Democratic	Buddy Wheatley	509,308	39.38%	−8.36%
Write-in		460	0.04%	
Total votes		1,293,463	100.00%	

== Louisiana ==
2023 Louisiana Secretary of State election
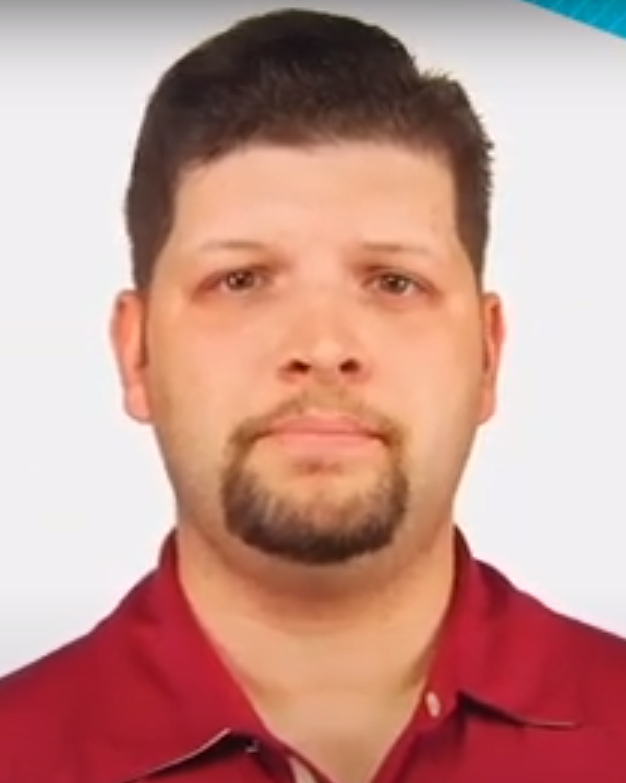
Nominee	Nancy Landry	Gwen Collins-Greenup	Mike Francis
Party	Republican	Democratic	Republican
First round	197,514; 19.3%	196,534; 19.2%	182,842; 17.9%
Runoff	446,038; 66.8%	221,698; 33.2%	Eliminated
Nominee	Clay Schexnayder	Arthur Morrell	Thomas Kennedy III
Party	Republican	Democratic	Republican
First round	149,987; 14.7%	113,703; 11.1%	102,628; 10.5%
Runoff	Eliminated	Eliminated	Eliminated
Nominee	Brandon Trosclair
Party	Republican
First round	64,686; 6.3%
Runoff	Eliminated
- Landry: 20–30% 50–60% 60–70% 70–80% 80–90% >90% Collins-Greenup: 20–30% 30–40% 50–60% 80–90% Francis: 20–30% 30–40% 40–50% 50–60% 60–70% Schexnayder: 20–30% 30–40% Morrell: 40–50% Kennedy: 40–50%
Secretary of State before election
Kyle Ardoin
Republican
Elected Secretary of State
Nancy Landry
Republican

Incumbent secretary of state Kyle Ardoin was re-elected to a second term in 2019 with 59.1% of the vote. Arodin is eligible to seek a third term, however he has chosen to retire instead.

Louisiana utilizes a jungle primary system. The race went to a runoff between former state representative Nancy Landry and attorney Gwen Collins-Greenup. Landry won with 66.8% of the vote.

2023 Louisiana Secretary of State election jungle primary
Party	Candidate	Votes	%
Republican	Nancy Landry	197,514	19.34%
Democratic	Gwen Collins-Greenup	196,534	19.25%
Republican	Mike Francis	182,842	17.91%
Republican	Clay Schexnayder	149,987	14.69%
Democratic	Arthur Morrell	113,703	11.13%
Republican	Thomas Kennedy III	102,628	10.05%
Republican	Brandon Trosclair	64,686	6.33%
Independent	Amanda Jennings	13,275	1.30%
Total votes		1,021,169	100.0%

2023 Louisiana Secretary of State runoff election
Party	Candidate	Votes	%	±%
Republican	Nancy Landry	446,038	66.80%	+7.73
Democratic	Gwen Collins-Greenup	221,698	33.20%	−7.73
Total votes		667,736	100.0%	

== Mississippi ==
Mississippi Secretary of State election, 2023
- November 7, 2023

Nominee	Michael Watson	Ty Pinkins
Party	Republican	Democratic
Popular vote	481,895	328,067
Percentage	59.5%	40.5%
- County results Watson: 50–60% 60–70% 70–80% 80–90% Pinkins: 50–60% 60–70% 70–80% 80–90%
Secretary of State before election
Michael Watson
Republican
Elected Secretary of State
Michael Watson
Republican

Incumbent secretary of state Michael Watson ran and won re-election to a second term after he defeated Democratic nominee Ty Pinkins with 59.5% of the vote.

Republican primary results
Party	Candidate	Votes	%
Republican	Michael Watson (incumbent)	351,774	100.00%
Total votes		351,774	100.00%

Democratic primary results
Party	Candidate	Votes	%
Democratic	Shuwaski Young	152,115	100.00%
Total votes		152,115	100.00%

2023 Mississippi Secretary of State election
Party	Candidate	Votes	%	±%
Republican	Michael Watson (incumbent)	481,895	59.50%	+0.67%
Democratic	Ty Pinkins	328,067	40.50%	–0.67%
Total votes		809,962	100.0%	

== See also ==
- 2023 United States elections
