= 2027 United States secretary of state elections =

- November 2, 2027; October 9 (Louisiana)

3 secretary of state offices (Note: Seat tallies and popular vote do not include states that do not elect secretaries of state.)
	Majority party	Minority party
Party	Republican	Democratic
Seats up	3	0
- Republican incumbent Term-limited or retiring Republican; No election

The 2027 United States secretary of state elections are scheduled to be held on November 2, 2027, in the states of Kentucky and Mississippi, with an election occurring in Louisiana on October 9. The last regular secretary of state elections for all three states were in 2023.

== Race summary ==
State	Secretary of State	Party	First elected	Last race	Status	Candidates
Kentucky	Michael Adams	Republican	2019	60.6% R	Term-limited	▌Mike Harmon (Republican); ▌Brad Holsclaw (Republican); ▌Adam Moore (Democratic); ▌Jack Whitfield (Republican); ▌Nick Wilson (Republican)
Louisiana	Nancy Landry	Republican	2023	66.8% R	Incumbent's intent unknown	TBD
Mississippi	Michael Watson	Republican	2019	59.5% R	Incumbent retiring to run for lieutenant governor	▌Whitney Lipscomb (Republican); ▌Jeff Tate (Republican); ▌Shuwaski Young (Republican)

== Kentucky ==
Secretary of State Michael Adams was re-elected in 2023 with 60.6% of the vote. He is term-limited and ineligible to run for re-election to a third term.

== Louisiana ==
Secretary of State Nancy Landry was elected in 2023 with 66.8% of the vote. She is eligible to run for re-election but has not yet stated if she will do so.

== Mississippi ==
Secretary of State Michael Watson was re-elected in 2023 with 59.5% of the vote. He is eligible to run for re-election but has instead announced a bid for lieutenant governor.
