= 2023 Louisiana lieutenant gubernatorial election =

- October 14, 2023
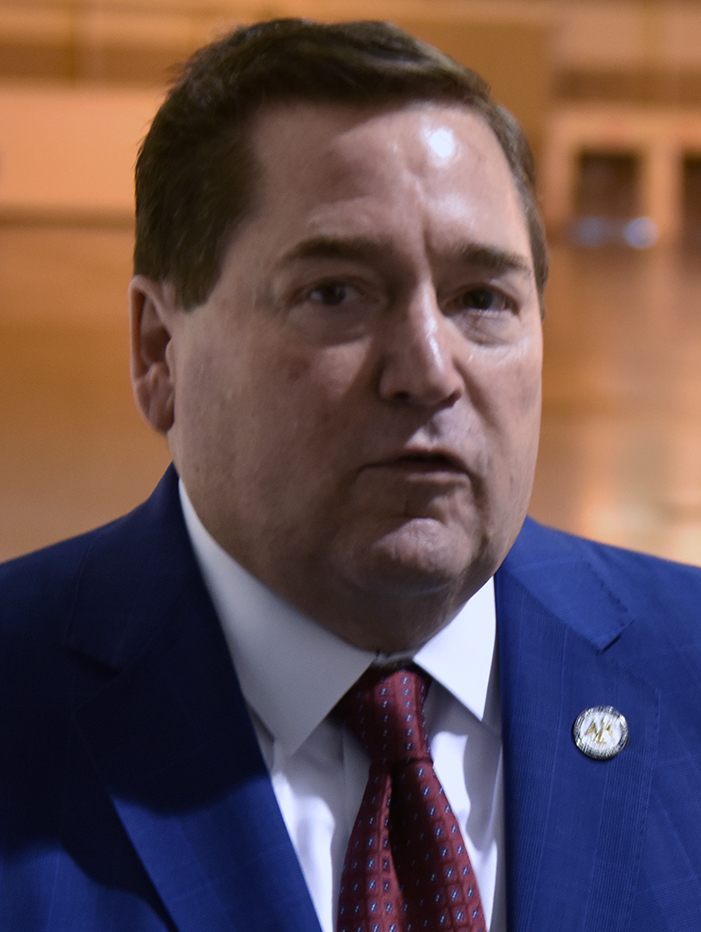

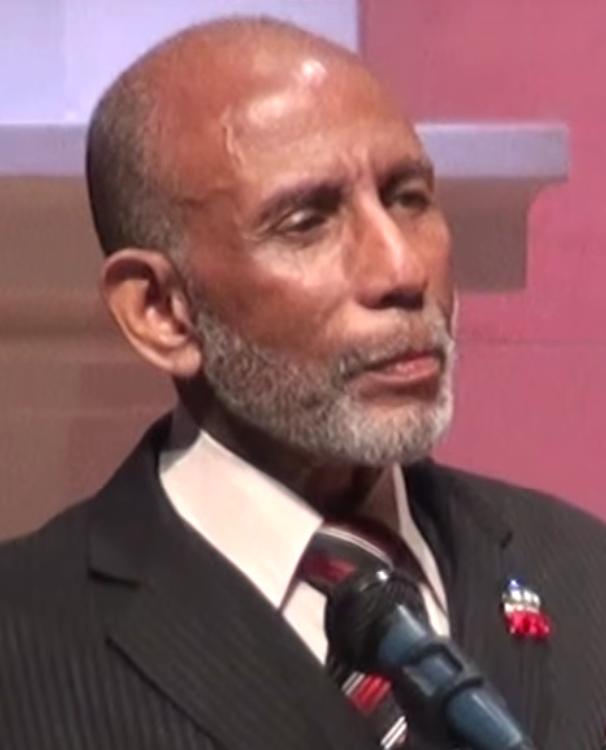
Candidate	Billy Nungesser	Willie Jones	Elbert Guillory
Party	Republican	Democratic	Republican
Popular vote	678,531	211,988	64,058
Percentage	65.52%	20.47%	6.29%
- Nungesser: 30–40% 40–50% 50–60% 60–70% 70–80% 80–90% >90% Jones: 30–40% 40–50% 50–60% 60–70% 70–80% 80–90% >90% Guillory: 50–60% Hotard: 30–40% >90% Payton: 50–60% Tie: 20–30% 30–40% 40–50% 50% No votes
Lt. Governor before election
Billy Nungesser
Republican
Elected Lt. Governor
Billy Nungesser
Republican

The 2023 Louisiana lieutenant gubernatorial election took place on October 14, 2023, to elect the lieutenant governor of Louisiana. Incumbent Republican Lieutenant Governor Billy Nungesser was re-elected to a third consecutive term with more than 65% of votes.

Under Louisiana's two round system, all candidates appear on the same ballot, regardless of party, and voters may vote for any candidate, regardless of their party affiliation.

== Candidates ==
=== Republican candidates ===
==== Declared ====
- Elbert Guillory, former state senator (2009–2016) and candidate for lieutenant governor in 2015
- Tami Hotard, journalist
- Billy Nungesser, incumbent lieutenant governor

==== Withdrew ====
- Stuart Bishop, state representative

==== Declined ====
- John Fleming, former U.S. Representative for Louisiana's 4th congressional district (2009–2017) (running for state treasurer)
- Scott McKnight, state representative (running for state treasurer)
- Jennifer Van Vrancken, Jefferson Parish councilor

=== Democratic candidates ===
==== Declared ====
- Willie Jones, activist and candidate for lieutenant governor in 2019

=== Independent candidates ===
==== Declared ====
- Bruce Payton
- Gary Rispone

==== Withdrew ====
- Chester Pritchett

== Jungle primary ==
=== Endorsements ===
Willie Jones (D)

Political parties

- Louisiana Democratic Party
Billy Nungesser (R)

Labor unions

- Greater New Orleans AFL-CIO

Organizations

- NRA Political Victory Fund

Newspapers

- The Times-Picayune/The New Orleans Advocate

=== Polling ===
Poll source	Date(s) administered	Sample size (Note: Key: A – all adults RV – registered voters LV – likely voters V – unclear)	Margin of error	Billy Nungesser (R)	Elbert Guillory (R)	Other	Undecided
WPA Intelligence (R) (Note: Poll conducted for Nungesser's campaign)	Before April 18, 2023	–	–	42%	9%	7%	42%

=== Results ===
Second place winner by parish Jones: 30–40%; 40–50%; 50–60%; 60–70%; 70–80%; 80–90%; >90%; Guillory: 30–40%; 40–50%; Hotard: 20–30%

2023 Louisiana lieutenant gubernatorial election
Party	Candidate	Votes	%
Republican	Billy Nungesser (incumbent)	678,531	65.52%
Democratic	Willie Jones	211,988	20.47%
Republican	Elbert Guillory	64,058	6.19%
Republican	Tami Hotard	50,711	4.90%
Independent	Bruce Payton	17,195	1.66%
Independent	Gary Rispone	13,111	1.27%
Total votes		1,035,594	100.0%
Republican hold			

==== By congressional district ====
Nungesser won five of six congressional districts.

District	Nungesser	Jones	Guillory	Representative
1st	78%	12%	3%	Steve Scalise
2nd	45%	47%	2%	Troy Carter
3rd	68%	14%	9%	Clay Higgins
4th	61%	21%	10%	Mike Johnson
5th	66%	19%	7%	Julia Letlow
6th	70%	16%	5%	Garret Graves
