= 2023 United States lieutenant gubernatorial elections =

- November 7, 2023; October 14 (Louisiana)

2 lieutenant governorships (Note: Seat tallies and popular vote do not include states that do not elect lieutenant governors separately from governors.)
	Majority party	Minority party
Party	Republican	Democratic
Seats before	12	4
Seats after	12	4
Seat change	Steady	Steady
Popular vote	1,284,256	529,335
Percentage	69.65%	28.71%
Seats up	2	0
Races won	2	0
- Republican hold No election

The 2023 United States lieutenant gubernatorial elections were held on November 7, 2023, in the state of Mississippi and in Louisiana on October 14. The previous lieutenant gubernatorial elections for this group of states took place in 2019.

== Partisan composition ==
Going into the election, there were 12 Republican lieutenant governors, 4 Democratic lieutenant governors, and 1 Vermont Progressive lieutenant governor in the United States. This class of lieutenant governors is made up of 2 Republicans. Republicans did not hold any states won by Joe Biden in 2020.

== Race summary ==
State	Lieutenant governor	Party	First elected	Last race	Status	Candidates
Louisiana	Billy Nungesser	Republican	2015	68.1% R	Incumbent re-elected.	▌ ✓ Billy Nungesser (Republican) 65.5%; ▌Willie Jones (Democratic) 20.5%; ▌Elbert Guillory (Republican) 6.2%; ▌Tami Hotard (Republican) 4.9%; Others: ▌Bruce Payton (Independent) 1.7%; ▌Gary Rispone (Independent) 1.3%
Mississippi	Delbert Hosemann	Republican	2019	60.0% R	Incumbent re-elected.	▌ ✓ Delbert Hosemann (Republican) 60.7%; ▌Ryan Grover (Democratic) 39.3%

== Louisiana ==
Louisiana lieutenant gubernatorial election
- October 14, 2023
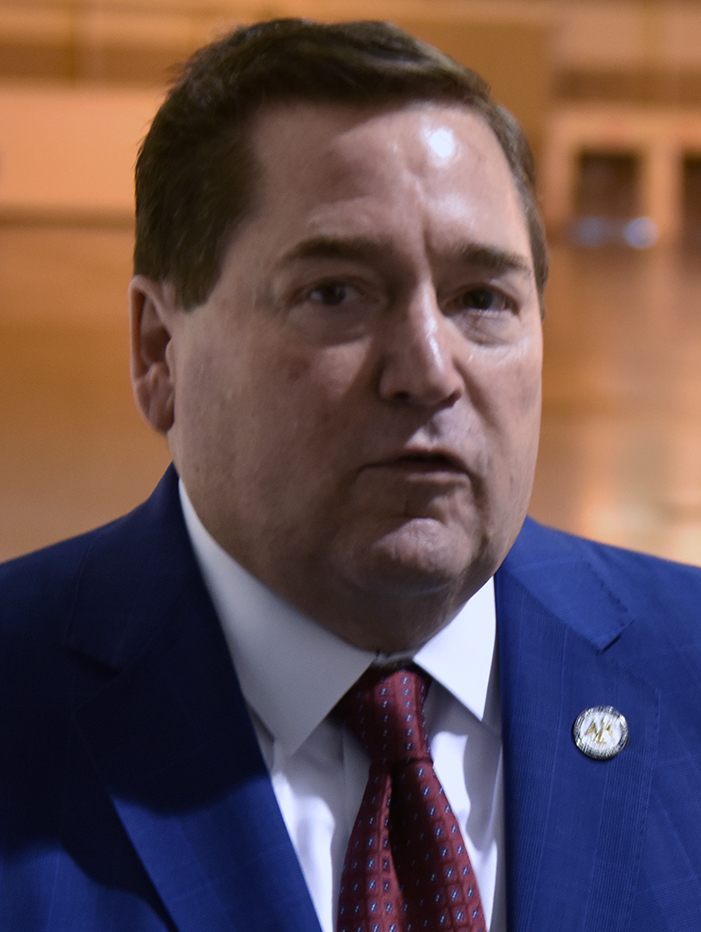

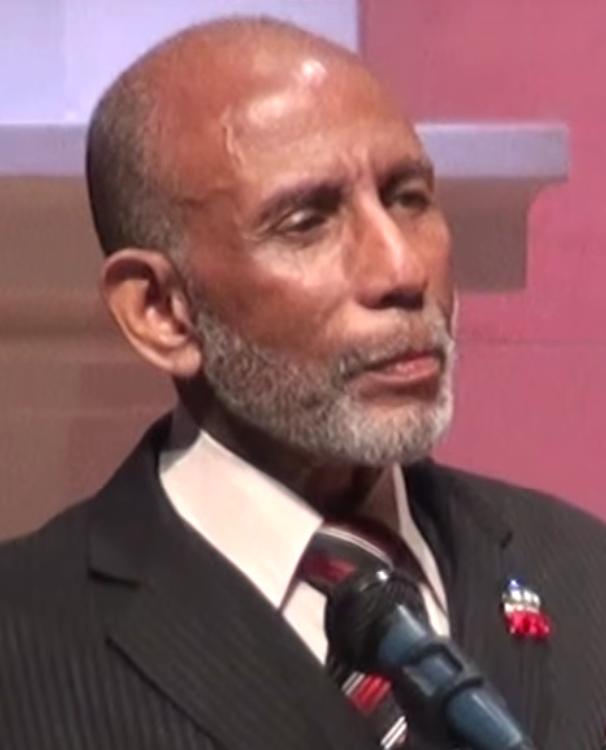
Candidate	Billy Nungesser	Willie Jones	Elbert Guillory
Party	Republican	Democratic	Republican
Popular vote	678,531	211,988	64,058
Percentage	65.52%	20.47%	6.29%
- Parish results Nungesser: 30–40% 40–50% 50–60% 60–70% 70–80% 80–90% >90% Jones: 30–40% 40–50% 50–60% 60–70% 70–80% 80–90% >90% Guillory: 50–60% Hotard: 30–40% >90% Payton: 50–60% Tie: 20–30% 30–40% 40–50% 50% No votes
Lieutenant Governor before election
Billy Nungesser
Republican
Elected Lieutenant Governor
Billy Nungesser
Republican

Lieutenant Governor Billy Nungesser was re-elected in 2019 with 68.1% of the vote. He successfully ran for re-election winning with 65.5% of the vote avoiding a runoff election.

2023 Louisiana lieutenant gubernatorial election
Party	Candidate	Votes	%
Republican	Billy Nungesser (incumbent)	678,531	65.52%
Democratic	Willie Jones	211,988	20.47%
Republican	Elbert Guillory	64,058	6.19%
Republican	Tami Hotard	50,711	4.90%
Independent	Bruce Payton	17,195	1.66%
Independent	Gary Rispone	13,111	1.27%
Total votes		1,035,594	100.0%
Republican hold			

== Mississippi ==
Mississippi lieutenant gubernatorial election
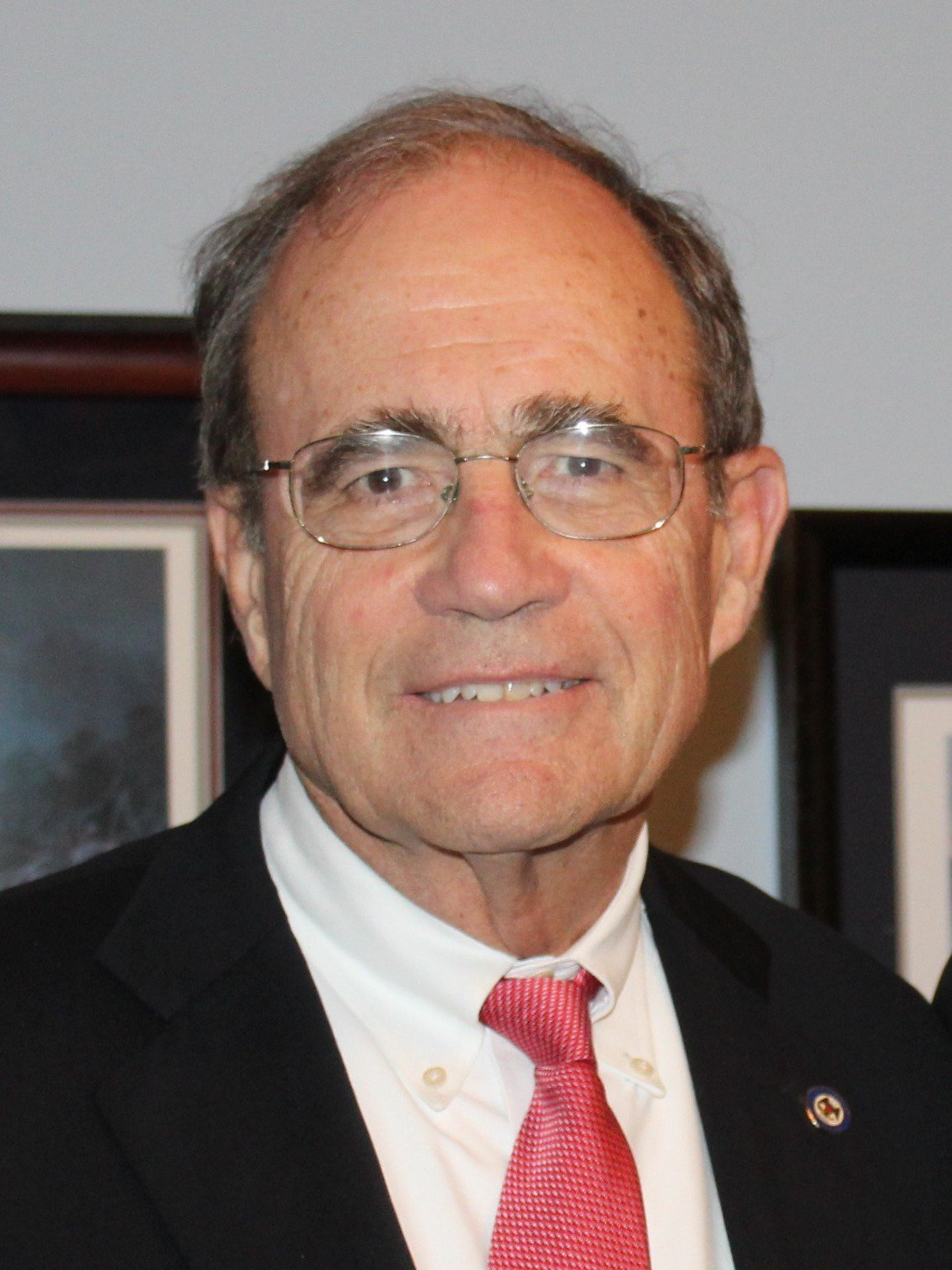

Nominee	Delbert Hosemann	Ryan Grover
Party	Republican	Democratic
Popular vote	490,956	317,347
Percentage	60.74%	39.26%
- County results 'Hosemann: 50–60% 60–70% 70–80% 80–90% >90% Grover: 50–60% 60–70% 70–80% 80–90% >90%
Lieutenant Governor before election
Delbert Hosemann
Republican
Elected Lieutenant Governor
Delbert Hosemann
Republican

Lieutenant Governor Delbert Hosemann was elected in 2019 with 60.0% of the vote. He successfully ran for re-election defeating Democrat Ryan Grover with 65.5% of the vote.

Republican primary results
Party	Candidate	Votes	%
Republican	Delbert Hosemann (incumbent)	198,979	52.11%
Republican	Chris McDaniel	162,708	42.61%
Republican	Tiffany Longino	20,143	5.28%
Total votes		381,830	100.00%

Democratic primary results
Party	Candidate	Votes	%
Democratic	D. Ryan Grover	151,793	100.00%
Total votes		151,793	100.00%

2023 Mississippi lieutenant gubernatorial election
Party	Candidate	Votes	%	±%
Republican	Delbert Hosemann (incumbent)	490,956	60.74%	+0.73%
Democratic	Ryan Grover	317,347	39.26%	–0.73%
Total votes		808,303	100.00%	
Republican hold				
