= 2023 United States state treasurer elections =

- November 7, 2023; November 18, 2023 (Louisiana)

3 state treasurer offices (Note: Seat tallies and popular vote do not include states that do not elect state treasurers or territorial state treasurers.)
	Majority party	Minority party
Party	Republican	Democratic
Seats before	25	12
Seats after	25	12
Seat change	Steady	Steady
Popular vote	1,645,074	1,117,226
Percentage	59.55%	40.45%
Seats up	3	0
Seats won	3	0
- Republican hold No election

The 2023 United States state treasurer elections were held on November 7, 2023, in the states of Kentucky and Mississippi, with an election held in Louisiana on November 18, to elect the state treasurers of three U.S. states. The previous elections for this group of states took place in 2019.

These elections took place concurrently with several other state and local elections.

Republicans won every seat in this election.

== Race summary ==
State	State Treasurer	Party	First elected	Result	Candidates
Kentucky	Allison Ball	Republican	2015	Incumbent term-limited. Republican hold.	▌ ✓ Mark Metcalf (Republican) 57.2%; ▌Michael Bowman (Democratic) 42.8%
Louisiana	John Schroder	Republican	2017 (special)	Incumbent retired to run for governor. Republican hold.	▌ ✓ John Fleming (Republican) 65.4%; ▌Dustin Granger (Democratic) 34.6%
Mississippi	David McRae	Republican	2019	Incumbent re-elected. Republican hold.	▌ ✓ David McRae (Republican) 58.4%; ▌Addie Lee Green (Democratic) 41.6%

== Kentucky ==
Kentucky State Treasurer election
Nominee	Mark Metcalf	Michael Bowman
Party	Republican	Democratic
Popular vote	735,066	549,257
Percentage	57.2%	42.8%
- County results Metcalf: 50–60% 60–70% 70–80% 80–90% Bowman: 50–60% 60–70%
State Treasurer before election
Allison Ball
Republican
Elected State Treasurer
Mark Metcalf
Republican

Incumbent state treasurer Allison Ball was term-limited and could not seek re-election. Republican Garrard County attorney Mark Metcalf defeated Democrat Michael Bowman with 57.2% of the vote.

Republican primary results
Party	Candidate	Votes	%
Republican	Mark Metcalf	135,400	51.2
Republican	Andrew Cooperrider	77,347	29.3
Republican	OJ Oleka	51,582	19.5
Total votes		264,329	100

2023 Kentucky Treasurer election results
Party	Candidate	Votes	%
Republican	Mark Metcalf	735,066	57.2
Democratic	Michael Bowman	549,257	42.8
Total votes		1,284,323	100

== Louisiana ==
Louisiana State Treasurer election
- November 18, 2023
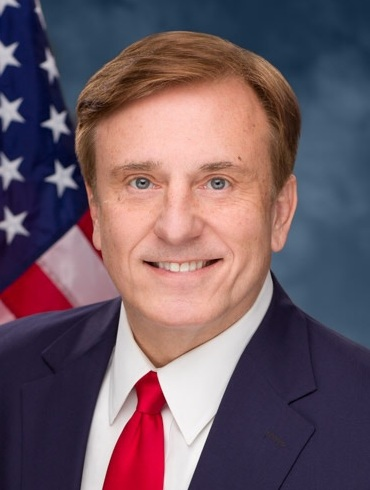

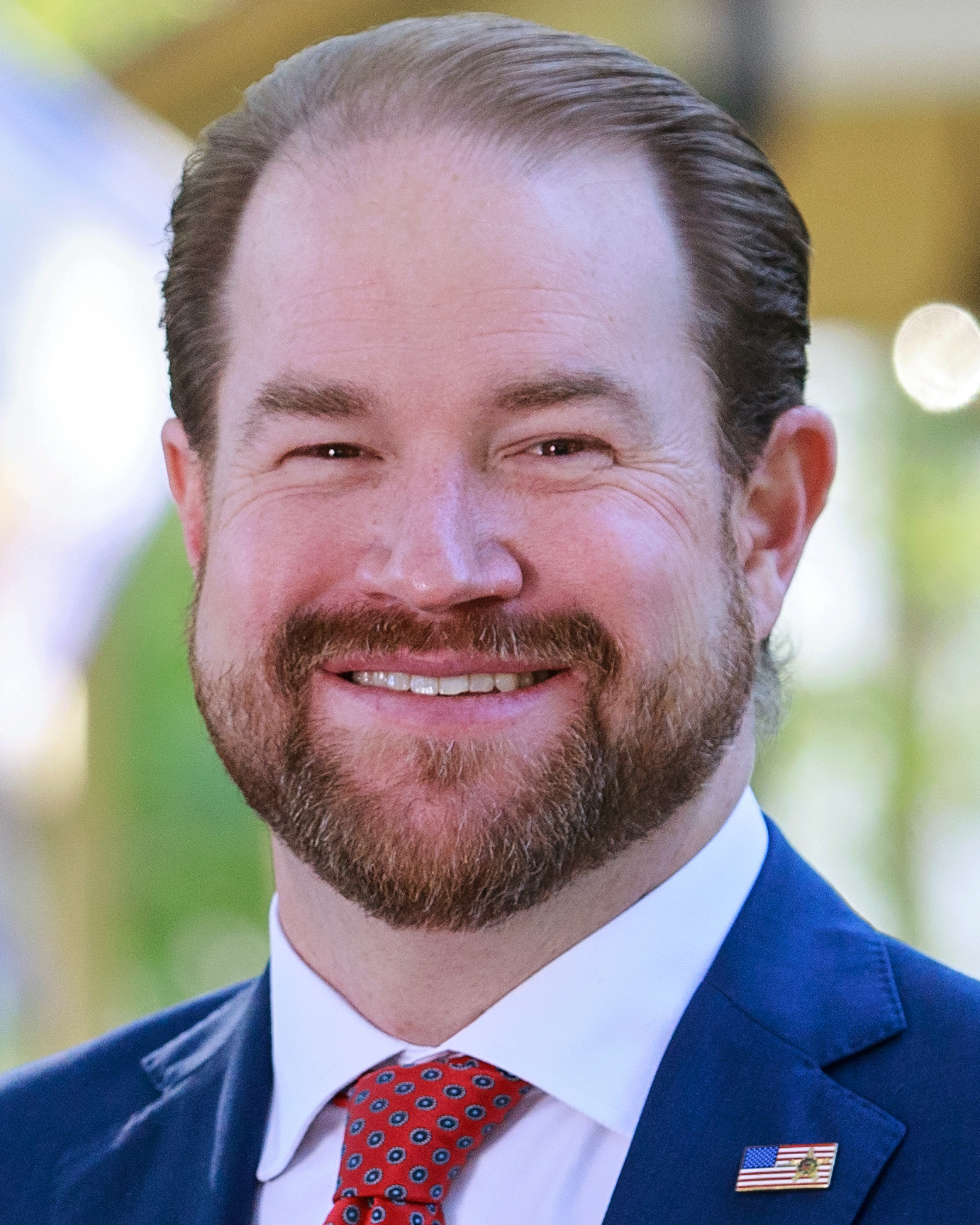
Nominee	John Fleming	Dustin Granger	Scott McKnight
Party	Republican	Democratic	Republican
First round	442,668; 44.0%	321,423; 32.0%	241,125; 24.0%
Runoff	437,303; 65.4%	230,961; 34.6%	Eliminated
- Fleming: 30–40% 40–50% 50–60% 60–70% 70–80% 80–90% >90% Granger: 30–40% 40–50% 50–60% 60–70% 70–80% 80–90%
Treasurer before election
John Schroder
Republican
Elected Treasurer
John Fleming
Republican

Incumbent state treasurer John Schroder chose not to seek re-election and instead opted to unsuccessfully run for governor. Former Republican U.S. Representative John Fleming defeated Democrat Dustin Granger with 65.4% of the vote in the runoff.

2023 Louisiana Treasurer election jungle primary
Party	Candidate	Votes	%
Republican	John Fleming	442,668	44.04%
Democratic	Dustin Granger	321,423	31.98%
Republican	Scott McKnight	241,125	23.99%
Total votes		1,005,221	100.0%

2023 Louisiana Treasurer runoff election
Party	Candidate	Votes	%	±%
Republican	John Fleming	437,303	65.44%	+5.43
Democratic	Dustin Granger	230,961	34.56%	+0.03
Total votes		668,264	100.0%	

== Mississippi ==
Mississippi State Treasurer election
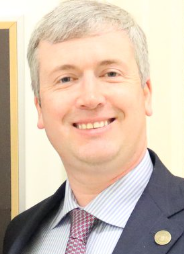

Nominee	David McRae	Addie Lee Green
Party	Republican	Democratic
Popular vote	472,705	337,008
Percentage	58.4%	41.6%
- County results McRae: 50–60% 60–70% 70–80% 80–90% Green: 50–60% 60–70% 70–80% 80–90%
State Treasurer before election
David McRae
Republican
Elected State Treasurer
David McRae
Republican

Incumbent state treasurer David McRae ran and won re-election to a second term after he defeated Democratic nominee Addie Lee Green with 58.4% of the vote.

Republican primary results
Party	Candidate	Votes	%
Republican	David McRae (incumbent)	349,800	100.00%
Total votes		349,800	100.00%

Democratic primary results
Party	Candidate	Votes	%
Democratic	Addie Lee Green	153,149	100.00%
Total votes		153,149	100.00%

2023 Mississippi State Treasurer election
Party	Candidate	Votes	%	±%
Republican	David McRae (incumbent)	472,705	58.38%	−2.42%
Democratic	Addie Lee Green	337,008	41.62%	+2.42%
Total votes		784,866	100.0%	
Republican hold				

== See also ==
- 2023 United States elections
