= Senator Craven =

Senator Craven may refer to:

- Dave Craven (born c. 1990), North Carolina State Senate
- Margaret Craven (politician) (born 1944), Maine State Senate
- William A. Craven (1921–1999), California State Senate

== See also ==
- Don Cravins Jr. (born 1972), Louisiana State Senate
- Senator Cravens (disambiguation)
