= 2026 Louisiana Board of Elementary and Secondary Education special election =

- November 3, 2026

1 of 8 seats on the Louisiana Board of Elementary and Secondary Education
Party	Republican	Democratic
Current seats	6	2

2026 Louisiana Board of Elementary and Secondary Education District 1 special election
- November 3, 2026
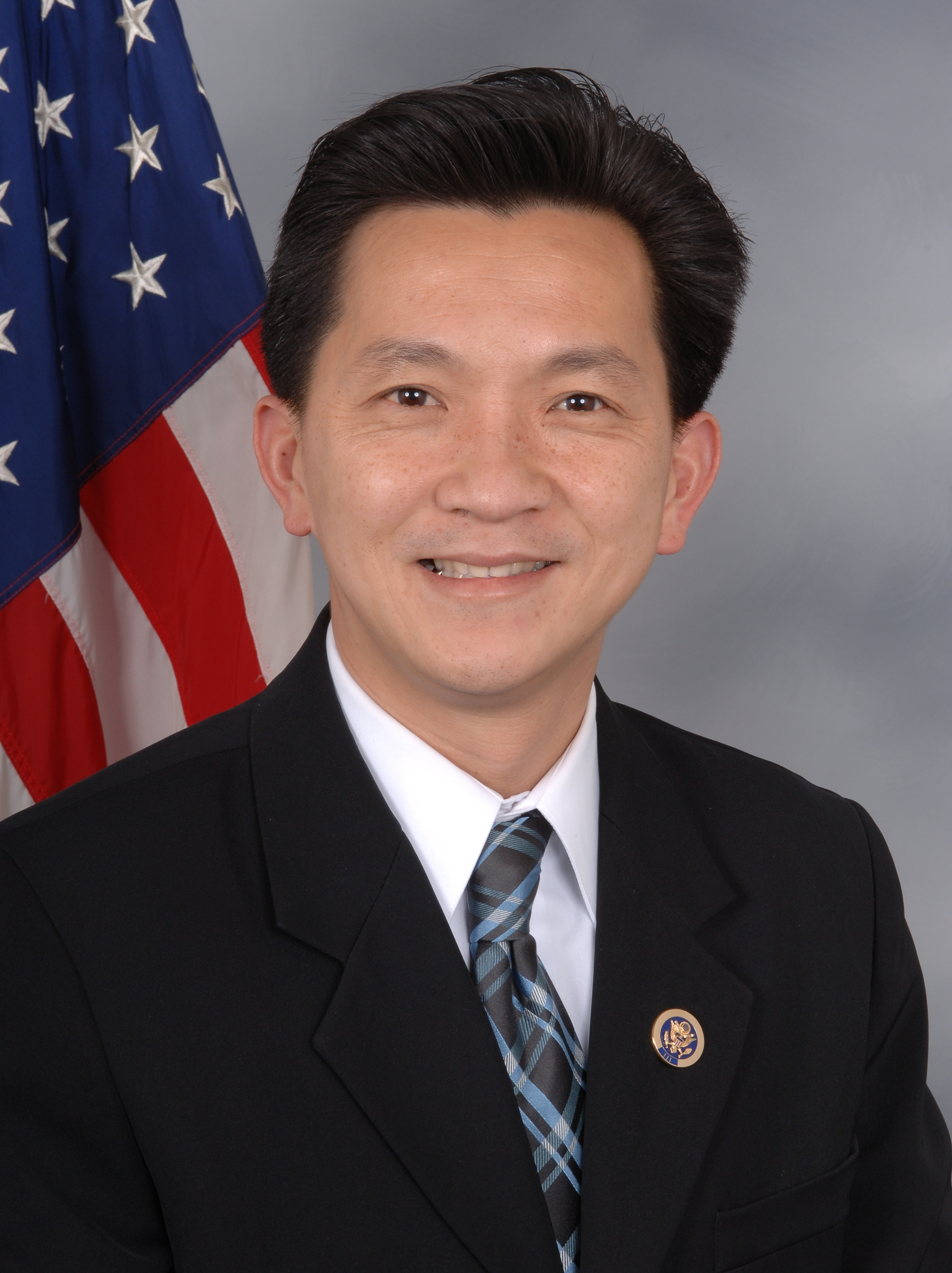

Candidate	Joseph Cao	Angela Hershey
Party	Republican	Democratic
Popular vote	127,178	73,614
Percentage	63.34%	36.66%
- Precinct results Cao: 50–60% 60–70% 70–80% 80–90% Hershey: 50–60% 60–70% 70–80% 80–90% >90% Other: No votes
Board Member before election
Joseph Cao
Republican
Elected Board Member
Joseph Cao
Republican

The 2026 Louisiana Board of Elementary and Secondary Education special election was held on November 3, 2026, to elect the member from the 1st district on the Louisiana Board of Elementary and Secondary Education. Primary elections were held on May 16, with the runoff taking place on June 27.

The winner will complete the term won in 2023 by Paul Hollis, who resigned in 2025 to become Director of the United States Mint. Incumbent appointee Board of Elementary and Secondary Education member and former U.S. Representative Joseph Cao is running in this election.

== Republican primary ==
=== Candidates ===
==== Nominee ====
- Joseph Cao, incumbent board member

==== Eliminated in runoff ====
- Ellie Schroder, education manager

==== Eliminated in primary ====
- Michael Hollis, businessman

=== Results ===
Republican primary results
Party	Candidate	Votes	%
Republican	Joseph Cao (incumbent)	31,648	47.2
Republican	Ellie Schroder	20,694	30.8
Republican	Michael Hollis	14,755	22.0
Total votes		67,097	100.0

=== Runoff results ===
Republican primary runoff results
Party	Candidate	Votes	%
Republican	Joseph Cao (incumbent)	29,417	52.0
Republican	Ellie Schroder	27,169	48.0
Total votes		56,586	100.0

== Democratic primary ==
=== Candidates ===
==== Nominee ====
- Angela Hershey, retired teacher
