= 2027 United States lieutenant gubernatorial elections =

- November 2, 2027; October 9 (Louisiana)

2 lieutenant governorships (Note: Seat tallies and popular vote do not include states that do not elect lieutenant governors separately from governors.)
	Majority party	Minority party
Party	Democratic	Republican
Seats before	10	7
Seats up	0	2
- Republican incumbent Term-limited Republican; No election

The 2027 United States lieutenant gubernatorial elections are scheduled to be held on November 2, 2027, in Mississippi and on October 9, 2027, in Louisiana. The previous lieutenant gubernatorial elections for this group of states took place in 2023.

== Partisan composition ==
Going into the election, there are 10 Democratic lieutenant governors and 7 Republican lieutenant governors who are not elected alongside their state's governors. This class of lieutenant governors is made up of two Republicans and zero Democrats.

== Retirements ==
There is one incumbent lieutenant governor (a Republican) who is retiring, as they are term-limited.

=== Republican ===
1. Mississippi: Delbert Hosemann is term-limited after 2 terms.

== Race summary ==
State	Lieutenant Governor	Party	First elected	Last race	Status	Candidates
Louisiana	Billy Nungesser	Republican	2015	65.5% R	Incumbent's intent unknown	TBD
Mississippi	Delbert Hosemann	Republican	2019	60.7% R	Term-limited	TBD

== Louisiana ==
Lieutenant Governor Billy Nungesser was reelected in 2023 with 65.52% of the vote. He is eligible to run for re-election but has not yet stated if he will do so.

== Mississippi ==
Lieutenant Governor Delbert Hosemann was reelected in 2023 with 60.74% of the vote. He will be term-limited by the Mississippi Constitution in 2027 and cannot seek re-election to a third term.
