= 2027 United States state treasurer elections =

- November 2, 2027; October 9 (Louisiana)

3 state treasurer offices (Note: Seat tallies and popular vote do not include states that do not elect state treasurers or territorial state treasurers.)
	Majority party	Minority party
Party	Republican	Democratic
Seats up	3	0
- Republican incumbent No election

The 2027 United States state treasurer elections are scheduled to be held on November 2, 2027, in the states of Kentucky and Mississippi, with an election occurring in Louisiana on October 9. The previous elections for this group of states took place in 2023.

These elections will be held concurrently with several other federal, state, and local elections.

== Race summary ==
State	State Treasurer	Party	First elected	Last race	Status	Candidates
Kentucky	Mark Metcalf	Republican	2023	57.2% R	Incumbent running	▌Mark Metcalf (Republican)
Louisiana	John Fleming	Republican	2023	65.4% R	Incumbent's intent unknown	TBD
Mississippi	David McRae	Republican	2019	59.0% R	Incumbent running	▌David McRae (Republican)

== Kentucky ==
State Treasurer Mark Metcalf was elected in 2023 with 57.2% of the vote. He is running for re-election for a second term.

== Louisiana ==
State Treasurer John Fleming was elected in 2023 with 65.4% of the vote. He is eligible to run for re-election but has not yet stated if he will do so.

== Mississippi ==
State Treasurer David McRae was re-elected in 2023 with 59.0% of the vote. He is running for re-election for a third term.

== See also ==
- 2027 United States elections
