= Louisiana's 68th House of Representatives district =

American legislative district

Louisiana's 68th State House of Representatives district
Representative
| Dixon McMakin; R–Baton Rouge |

Louisiana's 68th House of Representatives district is one of 105 Louisiana House of Representatives districts. It is currently represented by Republican Dixon McMakin of Baton Rouge.

== Geography ==
HD68 includes part of the cities of Baton Rouge and St. George, and the census-designated place of Innisworld .

== Election results ==
| Year | Winning candidate | Party | Percent | Opponent | Party | Percent | Opponent | Party | Percent |
|---|---|---|---|---|---|---|---|---|---|
| 2011 | Stephen Carter | Republican | 100% | | | | | | |
| 2015 | Stephen Carter | Republican | 54.7% | Patty Merrick | Democratic | 26.5% | Robert Cipriano | Republican | 18.8% |
| 2019 | Scott McKnight | Republican | 57.7% | Taryn Branson | Democratic | 42.3% | | | |
| 2023 | Dixon McMakin | Republican | 56.7% | Belinda Davis | Democratic | 43.3% | | | |
