= 2027 Mississippi Secretary of State election =

- November 2, 2027
Party	Republican	Democratic
Incumbent Secretary of State
Michael Watson
Republican

The 2027 Mississippi Secretary of State election will take place on November 2, 2027, to elect the secretary of state of Mississippi. Incumbent Republican Secretary of State Michael Watson is eligible to run for re-election to a third term, but is expected to run for Lieutenant Governor instead.

== Republican primary ==
=== Candidates ===
==== Declared ====
- Jeff Tate, state senator from the 33rd district (2020–present)
- Whitney Lipscomb, general counsel for the Republican Attorneys General Association
- Shuwaski Young, former Department of Homeland Security official, Democratic nominee for Mississippi's 3rd congressional district in 2022, and Democratic nominee (Note: Young was nominated in the primary, but later withdrew and was replaced on the ballot before the general election.) for secretary of state in 2023

==== Potential ====
- Jeremy England, state senator from the 51st district (2020–present)
- Brice Wiggins, state senator from the 52nd district (2012–present)
- Lee Yancey, state representative from the 74th district (2020–present)

==== Declined ====
- Joel Carter, state senator from the 49th district (2018–present) (running for re-election)
- Michael Watson, incumbent secretary of state (retiring to run for lieutenant governor)

=== Endorsements ===
Joel Carter (declined)

Executive branch officials

- Donald Trump, 45th and 47th president of the United States (2017–2021, 2025–present)

== Democratic primary ==
=== Candidates ===
==== Potential ====
- David Baria, former minority leader of the Mississippi House of Representatives (2016–2020) from the 122nd district (2012–2020) and nominee for U.S. senate in 2018
- Johnny DuPree, state senator from the 45th district (2026–present), nominee for governor in 2011, nominee for secretary of state in 2019, and nominee for Mississippi's 4th congressional district in 2022
- Brandon Jones, former state representative from the 111th district (2008–2012)

==== Declined ====
- David Blount, state senator from the 29th district (2008–present) (running for re-election)
- Ty Pinkins, lawyer, nominee for secretary of state in 2023, nominee for U.S. Senate in 2024, and independent candidate for U.S. Senate in 2026
