= Louisiana's 24th State Senate district =

American legislative district

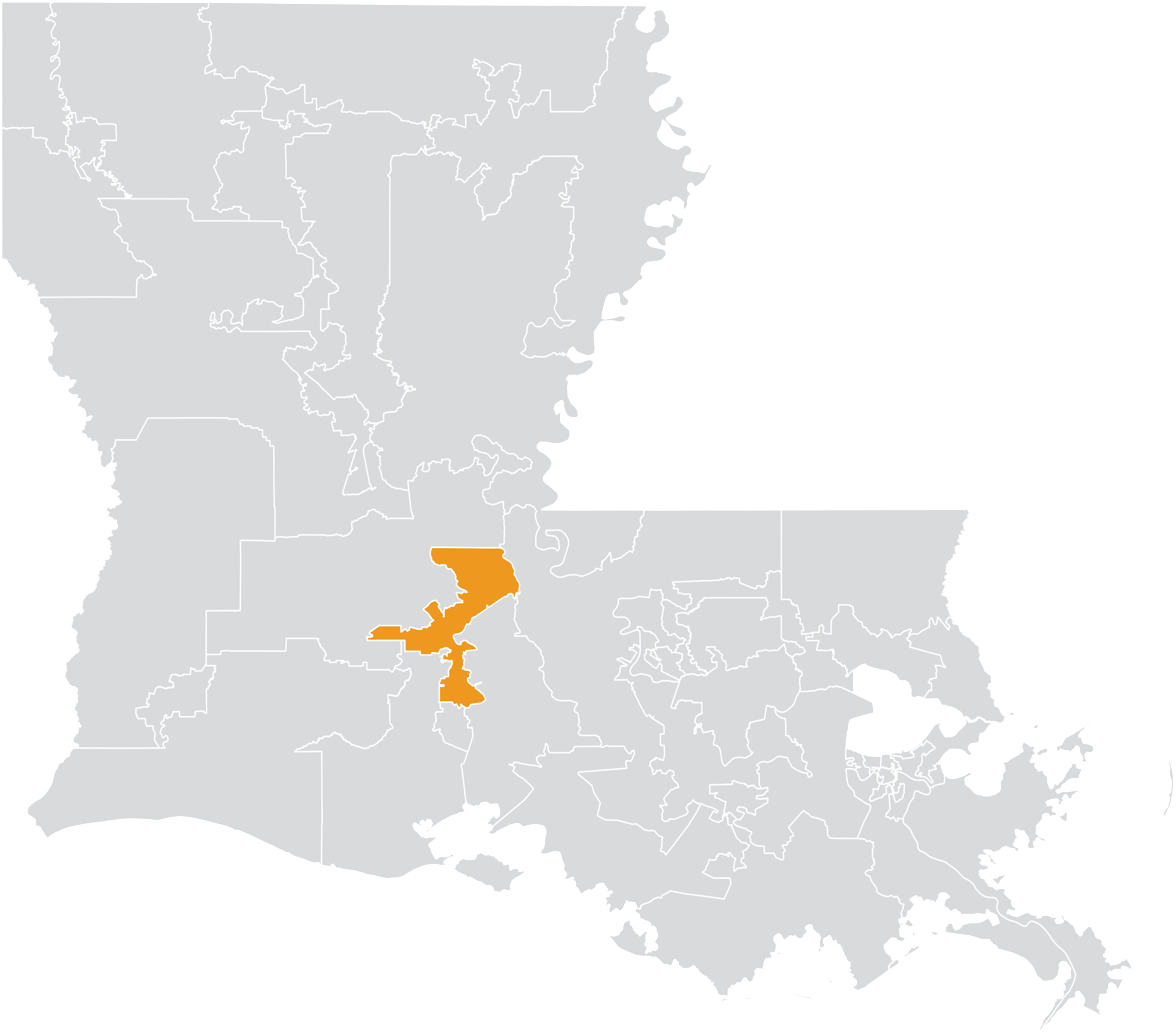
Senator
Gerald Boudreaux; D–Lafayette
- Registration: 56.3% Democratic; 19.2% Republican; 24.4% No party preference
- Demographics: 39% White; 56% Black; 3% Hispanic; 0% Asian; 1% Other
- Population (2019): 124,869
- Registered voters: 82,471

Louisiana's 24th State Senate district is one of 39 districts in the Louisiana State Senate. It has been represented by Democrat Gerald Boudreaux since 2016, succeeding Democrat-turned-Republican Elbert Guillory.

== Geography ==
District 24 stretches across several majority-black sections of Lafayette, St. Landry, and St. Martin Parishes in Acadiana, including northern Lafayette and some or all of Carencro, Scott, Sunset, Opelousas, Eunice, and Port Barre.

The district overlaps with Louisiana's 3rd, 4th, and 6th congressional districts, and with the 38th, 39th, 40th, 41st, 44th, 46th, and 96th districts of the Louisiana House of Representatives.

== Recent election results ==
Louisiana uses a jungle primary system. If no candidate receives 50% in the first round of voting, when all candidates appear on the same ballot regardless of party, the top-two finishers advance to a runoff election.

=== 2019 ===
2019 Louisiana State Senate election, District 24
Party	Candidate	Votes	%
Democratic	Gerald Boudreaux (incumbent)	24,418	75.5
Independent	Cory Levier I	7,922	24.5
Total votes		32,340	100
Democratic hold			

=== 2015 ===
2015 Louisiana State Senate election, District 24
Party	Candidate	Votes	%
Democratic	Gerald Boudreaux	17,846	60.8
Democratic	Ledricka Thierry	11,528	39.2
Total votes		29,374	100
Democratic gain from Republican			

=== 2011 ===
2011 Louisiana State Senate election, District 24
Primary election
Party	Candidate	Votes	%
Democratic	Elbert Guillory (incumbent)	12,768	46.4
Democratic	Don Cravins Sr.	11,210	40.7
Democratic	Kelly Scott	3,550	12.9
Total votes		27,528	100
General election
Democratic	Elbert Guillory (incumbent)	13,183	55.7
Democratic	Don Cravins Sr.	10,504	44.3
Total votes		23,687	100
Democratic hold			

=== Federal and statewide results ===
Year	Office	Results
2020	President	Biden 57.0–41.2%
2019	Governor (runoff)	Edwards 64.4–35.6%
2016	President	Clinton 57.4–40.0%
2015	Governor (runoff)	Edwards 71.9–28.1%
2014	Senate (runoff)	Landrieu 62.4–37.6%
2012	President	Obama 60.8–38.1%
