= Senator Cravens =

Senator Cravens may refer to:

- James A. Cravens (1818–1893), Indiana State Senate
- John R. Cravens (1819–1899), Indiana State Senate
- Jordan E. Cravens (1830–1914), Arkansas State Senate
- Kent Cravens (born 1960), New Mexico State Senate

== See also ==
- Don Cravins Jr. (born 1972), Louisiana State Senate
- Senator Craven (disambiguation)
