= Pat Brister =

American politician (1946–2020)

Patricia Phillips "Pat" Brister

President of St. Tammany Parish
- In office 2012–2020
- Preceded by: Kevin Davis
- Succeeded by: Michael B. Cooper

Chairman of the Louisiana Republican Party
- In office 2000–2004
- Preceded by: Francis Charles "Chuck" McMains, Jr.
- Succeeded by: Roger F. Villere, Jr.

Member of the St. Tammany Parish Council
- In office 2000–2008
- Preceded by: New position replacing St. Tammany Parish Police Jury
- Succeeded by: Reid Falconer

Personal details
- Born: December 6, 1946 Le Grange, Georgia, USA
- Died: February 3, 2020 (aged 73) Covington, Louisiana, USA
- Spouse(s): Joseph Stanley Brister, Jr.
- Occupation: [Politician]
- Active at all levels of the Republican Party, Brister is the first and thus far only woman to serve as Louisiana state chairman.

Patricia Phillips Beck Brister, known as Pat Brister (1946–2020), a businesswoman and Republican politician from Mandeville, Louisiana, who was the form president of the government in St. Tammany Parish in the New Orleans suburbs.

Government offices
Preceded by Kevin Davis	St. Tammany Parish President; 2012–2019	Succeeded by Incumbent
Party political offices
Preceded by Francis Charles "Chuck" McMains, Jr. of Baton Rouge	Louisiana Republican Party State Chairman; 2000–2004	Succeeded by Roger Francis Villere, Jr., of Metairie
Diplomatic posts
Preceded by Missing	United States Representative to the United Nations Commission on the Status of Women; 2006–2008	Succeeded by Missing
