= 2027 Mississippi lieutenant gubernatorial election =

- November 2, 2027
Party	Republican	Democratic
Incumbent Lieutenant Governor
Delbert Hosemann
Republican

The 2027 Mississippi lieutenant gubernatorial election will be held on November 2, 2027, to elect the lieutenant governor of Mississippi. Incumbent Republican Lieutenant Governor Delbert Hosemann is term-limited and ineligible to seek a third term.

== Republican primary ==
=== Candidates ===
==== Declared ====
- Michael Watson, incumbent Mississippi Secretary of State
