= 2023 Louisiana elections =

- October 14, 2023; November 18, 2023

A general election was held in the U.S. state of Louisiana on October 14, 2023, with second rounds held on November 18 where needed. Louisiana uses a two round system, where all candidates from all parties share the same ballot in the first round, and if no candidate wins an absolute majority, a runoff between the top two is held.

== Governor ==
Incumbent governor John Bel Edwards was ineligible to seek a third consecutive term due to Louisiana's term limits. State Attorney General Jeff Landry won with over 51% of the vote in the primary. This was the first time a candidate won a Louisiana gubernatorial election without a runoff since fellow Republican Bobby Jindal was re-elected in 2011. Landry easily prevailed over several Republican opponents, including former state chamber of commerce CEO Stephen Waguespack and State Treasurer John Schroder.

== Lieutenant governor ==
Incumbent lieutenant governor Billy Nungesser ran for re-election. He had previously expressed interest in running for governor, but decided against it.

== Attorney general ==
Incumbent attorney general Jeff Landry ran for governor. Louisiana Solicitor General Liz Murrill defeated attorney Lindsey Cheek in the runoff.

== Secretary of state ==
2023 Louisiana Secretary of State election
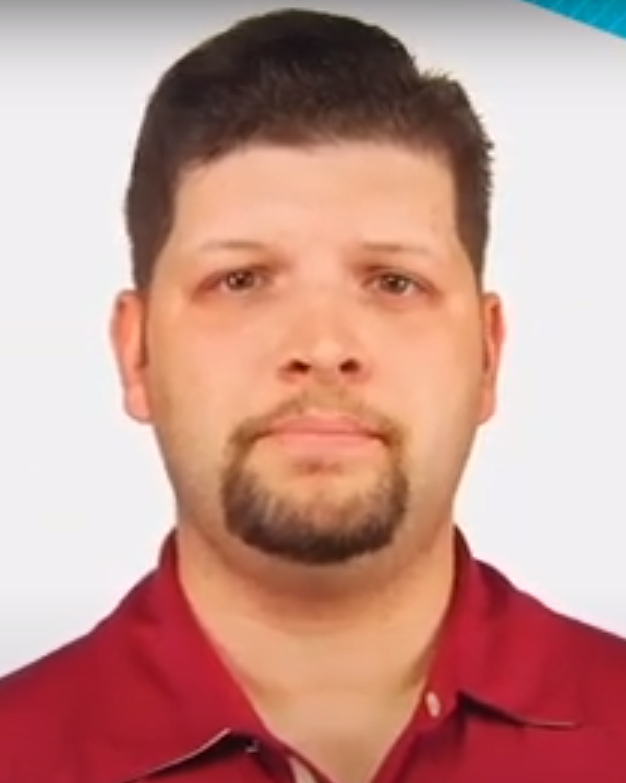
Nominee	Nancy Landry	Gwen Collins-Greenup	Mike Francis
Party	Republican	Democratic	Republican
First round	197,514; 19.3%	196,534; 19.2%	182,842; 17.9%
Runoff	446,038; 66.8%	221,698; 33.2%	Eliminated
Nominee	Clay Schexnayder	Arthur Morrell	Thomas Kennedy III
Party	Republican	Democratic	Republican
First round	149,987; 14.7%	113,703; 11.1%	102,628; 10.5%
Runoff	Eliminated	Eliminated	Eliminated
Nominee	Brandon Trosclair
Party	Republican
First round	64,686; 6.3%
Runoff	Eliminated
- Landry: 20–30% 50–60% 60–70% 70–80% 80–90% >90% Collins-Greenup: 20–30% 30–40% 50–60% 60–70% 80–90% Francis: 20–30% 30–40% 40–50% 50–60% 60–70% Schexnayder: 20–30% 30–40% Morrell: 40–50% Kennedy: 20–30%
Secretary of State before election
Kyle Ardoin
Republican
Elected Secretary of State
Nancy Landry
Republican

Incumbent secretary of state Kyle Ardoin retired. Former state representative Nancy Landry defeated attorney Gwen Collins-Greenup in the runoff.

=== Candidates ===
==== Advanced to runoff ====
- Nancy Landry (Republican), First Assistant Secretary of State and former state representative
- Gwen Collins-Greenup (Democratic), attorney and runner-up for secretary of state in 2018 and 2019

==== Eliminated in primary ====
- Mike Francis (Republican), Louisiana Public Service Commissioner and former chair of the Louisiana Republican Party
- Amanda Jennings (independent), insurance agent
- Thomas Kennedy III (Republican), businessman
- Arthur Morrell (Democratic), Orleans Parish Criminal District Clerk of Court
- Clay Schexnayder (Republican), Speaker of the Louisiana House of Representatives
- Brandon Trosclair (Republican), businessman

==== Declined ====
- Kyle Ardoin (Republican), incumbent secretary of state

=== General election ===
==== Candidate forum ====
2023 Louisiana Secretary of State candidate forum
No.	Date	Host	Link	Democratic	Republican	Independent	Republican	Republican	Democratic	Democratic	Republican
Key: P Participant A Absent N Not invited I Invited W Withdrawn											
Key: P Participant A Absent N Not invited I Invited W Withdrawn				Gwen Collins-Greenup	Mike Francis	Amanda Jennings	Thomas Kennedy III	Nancy Landry	Arthur Morrell	Clay Schexnayder	Brandon Trosclair
1	Sep. 21, 2023	Public Affairs; Research Council of Louisiana	YouTube	P	P	N	N	P	P	A	P

==== Polling ====
Poll source	Date(s) administered	Sample size (Note: Key: A – all adults RV – registered voters LV – likely voters V – unclear)	Margin of error	Gwen Collins-Greenup (D)	Mike Francis (R)	Amanda Jennings (I)	Thomas Kennedy III (R)	Nancy Landry (R)	Clay Schexnayder (R)	Brandon Trosclair (R)	Arthur Morrell (D)	Undecided
The Trafalgar Group (R) (Note: Poll commissioned by LA Integrity PAC)	September 11–15, 2023	1,062 (LV)	± 2.9%	14%	8%	1%	5%	11%	11%	3%	6%	41%

==== Results ====
2023 Louisiana Secretary of State election jungle primary
Party	Candidate	Votes	%
Republican	Nancy Landry	197,514	19.34%
Democratic	Gwen Collins-Greenup	196,534	19.25%
Republican	Mike Francis	182,842	17.91%
Republican	Clay Schexnayder	149,987	14.69%
Democratic	Arthur Morrell	113,703	11.13%
Republican	Thomas Kennedy III	102,628	10.05%
Republican	Brandon Trosclair	64,686	6.33%
Independent	Amanda Jennings	13,275	1.30%
Total votes		1,021,169	100.0%

=== Runoff ===
2023 Louisiana Secretary of State runoff election
Party	Candidate	Votes	%	±%
Republican	Nancy Landry	446,038	66.80%	+7.73
Democratic	Gwen Collins-Greenup	221,698	33.20%	−7.73
Total votes		667,736	100.0%	

== Treasurer ==
2023 Louisiana Treasurer election
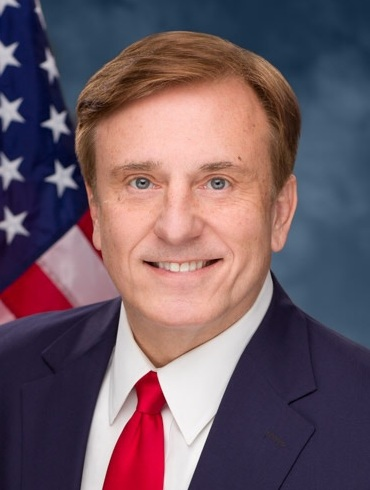

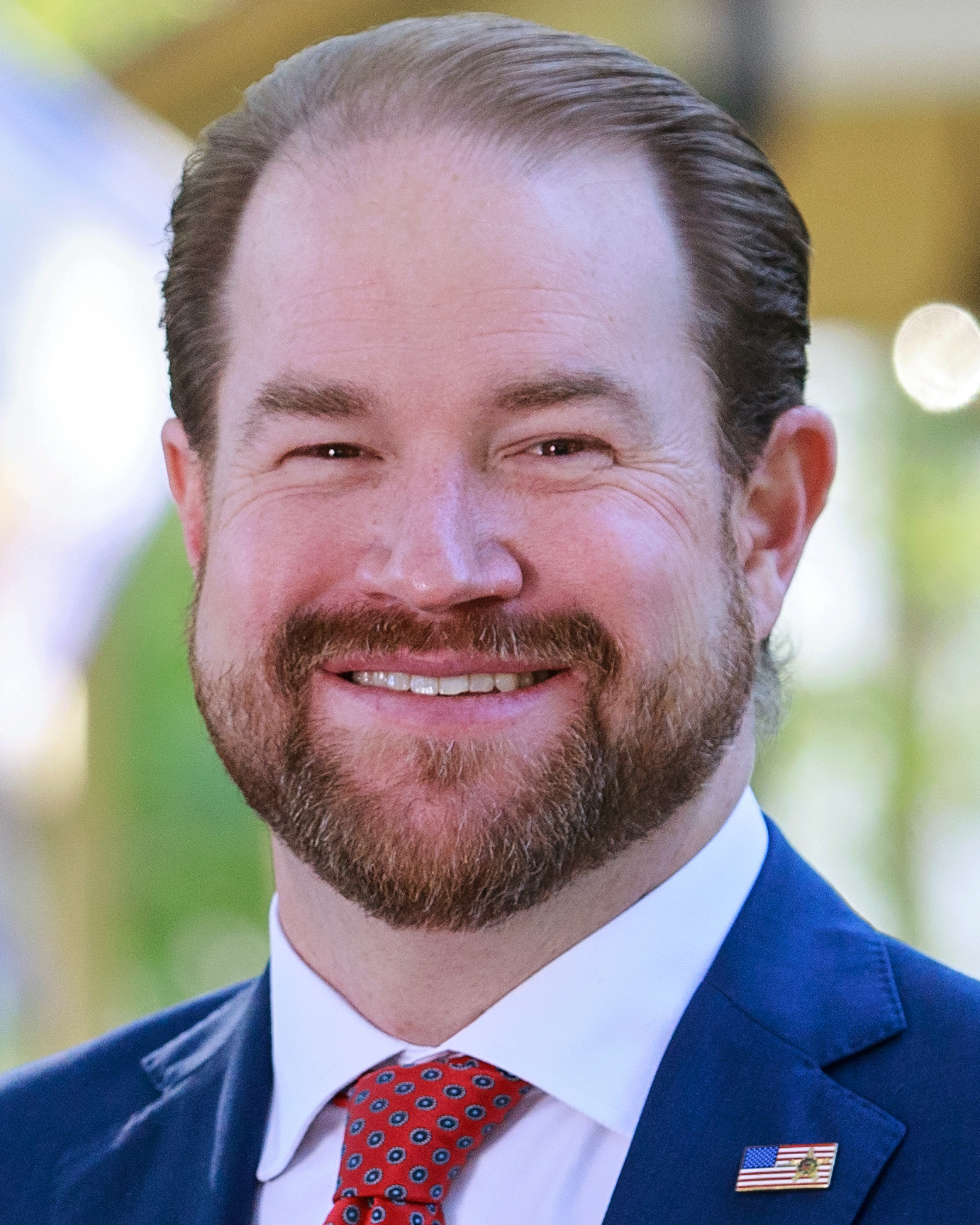
Nominee	John Fleming	Dustin Granger	Scott McKnight
Party	Republican	Democratic	Republican
First round	442,668; 44.0%	321,423; 32.0%	241,125; 24.0%
Runoff	437,303; 65.4%	230,961; 34.6%	Eliminated
- Fleming: 30–40% 40–50% 50–60% 60–70% 70–80% 80–90% >90% Granger: 30–40% 40–50% 50–60% 60–70% 70–80% 80–90%
Treasurer before election
John Schroder
Republican
Elected Treasurer
John Fleming
Republican

Incumbent treasurer John Schroder retired to run for governor. Former U.S. Representative John Fleming defeated Dustin Granger in the runoff.

=== Candidates ===
==== Advanced to runoff ====
- John Fleming (Republican), former U.S. Representative for Louisiana's 4th congressional district (2009–2017)
- Dustin Granger (Democratic), financial advisor

==== Eliminated in primary ====
- Scott McKnight (Republican), state representative

==== Declined ====
- John Schroder (Republican), incumbent treasurer (running for governor; endorsed McKnight)

=== General election ===
==== Candidate forum ====
2023 Louisiana State Treasurer candidate forum
No.	Date	Host	Link	Republican	Democratic	Republican
Key: P Participant A Absent N Not invited I Invited W Withdrawn						
Key: P Participant A Absent N Not invited I Invited W Withdrawn				John Fleming	Dustin Granger	Scott McKnight
1	Aug. 16, 2023	Public Affairs; Research Council of Louisiana	YouTube	P	P	P

2023 Louisiana Treasurer election jungle primary
Party	Candidate	Votes	%
Republican	John Fleming	442,668	44.04%
Democratic	Dustin Granger	321,423	31.98%
Republican	Scott McKnight	241,125	23.99%
Total votes		1,005,221	100.0%

=== Runoff ===
2023 Louisiana Treasurer runoff election
Party	Candidate	Votes	%	±%
Republican	John Fleming	437,303	65.44%	+5.43
Democratic	Dustin Granger	230,961	34.56%	+0.03
Total votes		668,264	100.0%	

== Commissioner of Agriculture and Forestry ==
Incumbent Agriculture commissioner Mike Strain ran for re-election.

=== Candidates ===
==== Declared ====
- Mike Strain (Republican), incumbent commissioner

=== Results ===
2023 Louisiana Commissioner of Agriculture and Forestry election
Party	Candidate	Votes	%	±%
Republican	Mike Strain (incumbent)			
Total votes				

== Commissioner of Insurance ==
Incumbent Insurance commissioner Jim Donelon retired.

=== Candidates ===
==== Declared ====
- Tim Temple (Republican), insurance executive and candidate for insurance commissioner in 2019

==== Declined ====
- Jim Donelon (Republican), incumbent commissioner

=== Results ===
2023 Louisiana Commissioner of Insurance election
Party	Candidate	Votes	%	±%
Republican	Tim Temple			
Total votes				

== Board of Elementary and Secondary Education ==
All eight members of the Louisiana Board of Elementary and Secondary Education were up for re-election.

== State legislature ==
=== State senate ===
All 39 seats in the Louisiana State Senate were up for re-election.

Party	Leader	Before	After	Change
Republican	Page Cortez (term-limited)	27	28	▲1
Democratic	Gerald Boudreaux	12	11	▼1
Total		39	39	Steady

=== State House ===
All 105 seats in the Louisiana House of Representatives were up for re-election.

Party	Leader	Before	After	Change
Republican	Clay Schexnayder (term-limited)	71	73	▲2
Democratic	Samuel Jenkins Jr. (retired)	33	32	▼1
Independent		1	0	▼1
Total		105	105	Steady

== Local ==
=== Caddo Parish Sheriff ===
The local race for Sheriff in Caddo Parish received national attention when Democrat Henry Whitehorn appeared to win the race by one vote against Republican John Nickelson. After more than 43,000 votes had been cast in the race, a recount still yielded a one-vote victory for Whitehorn. After the recount, Nickelson filed a lawsuit against Whitehorn and local election officials challenging the validity of the results and demanding that either he be declared the victor or a new election be held. A specially appointed judge, Joe Bleich, found that there had been 11 illegally cast votes and ordered a new election to take place no earlier than March 23, 2024. On appeal by Whitehorn, the Second Circuit Court of Appeal upheld the lower court's decision by a 3–2 margin. Whitehorn would go on to win the do-over election, this time expanding his lead to 4,000 against Nickelson, with Nickelson calling Whitehorn to concede the night of the election. After Sheriff Steve Prator's term expired on February 29, Chief Deputy Jay Long was sworn in as interim Sheriff while the special election was still underway. After Whitehorn's victory, he was sworn in as Caddo Parish Sheriff on June 28, 2024.

==== First election ====
Candidates

- Shayne Gibson (Republican), Sheriff of the Greenwood Police Department
- Patricia "Pat" Gilley (Democratic), retired attorney and former candidate for Caddo District Attorney in 2020
- Eric Hatfield (Republican), Chief Deputy Constable of Caddo Parish
- Hersey Jones Jr. (Democratic), neighborhood organizer
- John Nickelson (Republican), former member of the Shreveport City Council (advanced to run-off)
- Henry Whitehorn (Democratic), former Chief of Police of Shreveport (advanced to run-off)

Results

Caddo Parish Sheriff election jungle primary
Party	Candidate	Votes	%
Republican	John Nickelson	20,554	44.6%
Democratic	Henry Whitehorn	15,890	34.5%
Republican	Eric Hatfield	2,912	6.3%
Democratic	Hersey Jones Jr.	2,473	5.4%
Republican	Shayne Gibson	2,224	4.8%
Democratic	Patricia "Pat" Gilley	2,001	4.4%
Total votes		46,054	100%

Caddo Parish Sheriff runoff election (invalidated)
Party	Candidate	Votes	%	±%
Democratic	Henry Whitehorn	21,624	50.0012%	+15.5
Republican	John Nickelson	21,623	49.9988%	+5.5
Total votes		43,247	100%	N/A

==== Second election ====
Caddo Parish Sheriff runoff election (do-over)
Party	Candidate	Votes	%	±%
Democratic	Henry Whitehorn	34,752	53.3%	+3.3
Republican	John Nickelson	30,487	46.7%	−3.3
Total votes		65,239	100%	N/A

== See also ==
- Elections in Louisiana
- Politics of Louisiana
- Political party strength in Louisiana
