= Elbert Guillory =

American politician (born 1944)

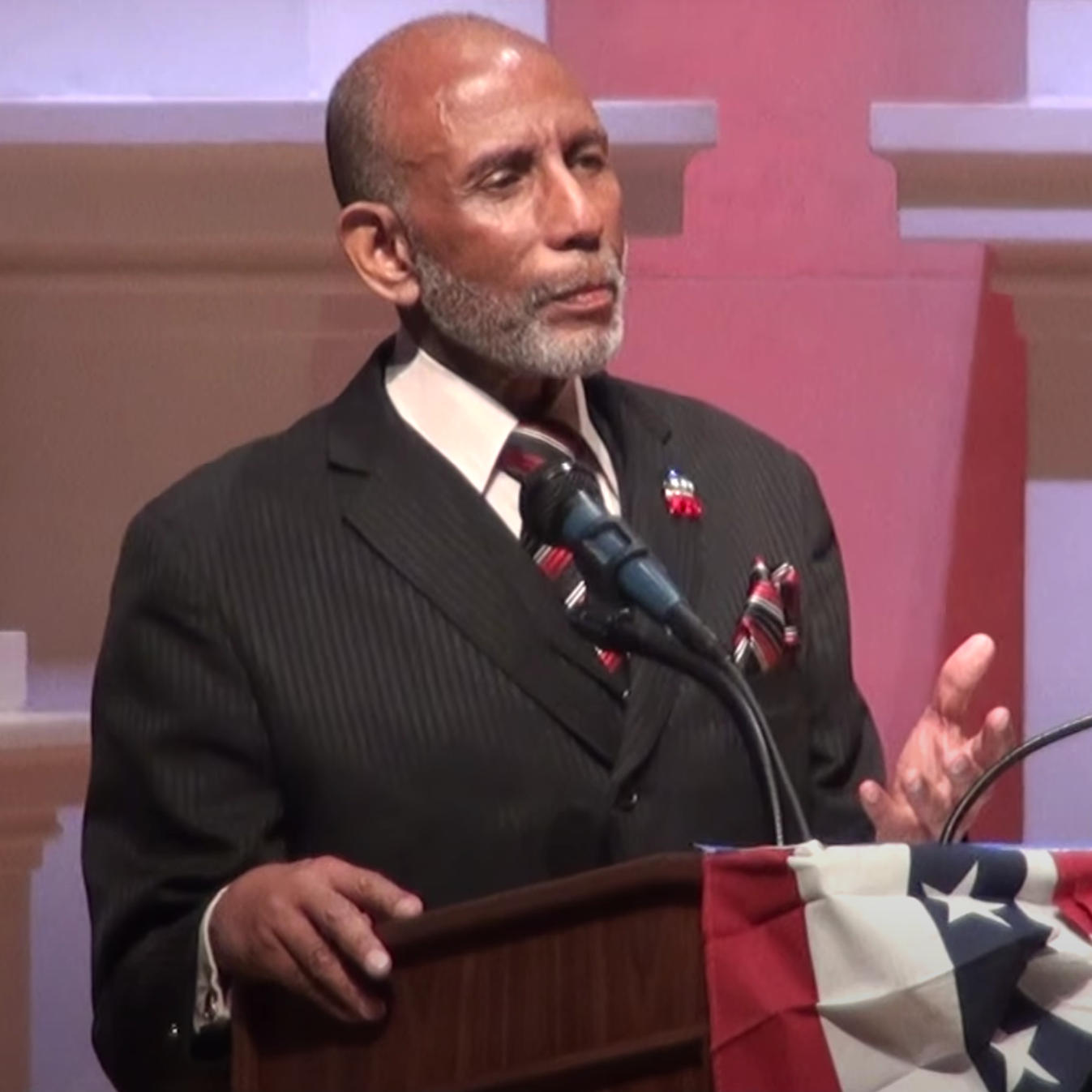

Member of the Louisiana Senate from the 24th district
- In office May 2009 – January 2016
- Preceded by: Don Cravins Jr.
- Succeeded by: Gerald Boudreaux

Member of the Louisiana House of Representatives from the 40th district
- In office January 2007 – January 2009
- Preceded by: Don Cravins Jr.
- Succeeded by: Ledricka Thierry

Personal details
- Born: Elbert Lee Guillory; June 24, 1944 (age 82) Opelousas, Louisiana, U.S.
- Party: Republican (Before 2007, 2013–present); Democratic (2007–2013)
- Education: Southern University; Norfolk State University (BS); Rutgers University, Newark (JD)
- Website: Official website

Elbert Lee Guillory (born June 24, 1944) is an American politician who is a former member of the Louisiana State Senate. A Republican, he represented District 24, including his native Opelousas, and several rural precincts, from May 2, 2009, when he won a special election, until January 11, 2016, when his full term to which he was elected in 2011 ended. Guillory previously served from 2006 to 2009 as state representative for District 40. Guillory was a candidate in Louisiana's 6th congressional district in the 2024 election.

== Background ==
Guillory was raised in St. Landry Parish by divorced parents. His Catholic father, Ozema Ledee (28 February 1903 - 4 January 2005), was an entrepreneur and an adventurer who flew his own plane, a rarity for a black man in the 1950s. He was also a bootlegger. Guillory's mother, Frances, was a strict Baptist who forbade alcohol and cursing in her home. She worked as a teacher and school principal.

== Party affiliation ==
Up until 2007, Guillory had been a registered Republican and served on the Louisiana Republican state central committee. He became a Democrat in 2007 when he first ran for the state House in the heavily Democratic District 40. During the 2013 regular session of the Louisiana Legislature, Guillory switched his party affiliation back to Republican. Officially, Guillory's party-switch occurred on May 31, when he was presented with the Frederick Douglass Award from the @Large Society.

Before Guillory's switch, the last Republican of African-American ethnicity in the Louisiana Senate had served during the Reconstruction era. In accepting the award, Guillory compared himself to 19th-century abolitionist Frederick Douglass, a Republican who had supported Abraham Lincoln.

Guillory's conservative political philosophy was indicated in his pre-2007 membership in the Republican Party, according to the Daily Kos, Guillory explained his 2013 party switch in a 4-minute 17-second video widely circulated in state and national media outlets, including the radio programs of Rush Limbaugh, Sean Hannity, and Moon Griffon as well as by Neil Cavuto on Fox News. The video was viewed on YouTube within the first three days by nearly 500,000. Filmed in the rear of the Senate chamber, the video calls the Democrats "the party of Jim Crow" and depicts "the party of freedom and progress" as the Republicans. Guillory called his switch "not only right for me, but for all of my brothers and sisters in the black community" as he left the Democrats for the Republicans.

Soon after re-joining the Republican Party, Guillory founded the Free at Last PAC, a political action committee dedicated to electing black conservatives to office.

== Legislative Black Caucus ==
Guillory remained a member of the Louisiana Legislature's Black Delegation, a caucus—a matter clarified by Legislative Black Caucus Chair State Representative Katrina Jackson, a Democrat from Monroe. The Baton Rouge Advocate in an editorial asserted that Guillory's switch to the Republicans "favors the GOP's efforts to broaden its base".

== 2015 lieutenant gubernatorial campaign ==
Within days of Guillory's change of parties, Jim Shannon of KLTV-TV speculated that Guillory would become a candidate for lieutenant governor in the 2015 state elections, when Jay Dardenne stepped down to run unsuccessfully against Democrat John Bel Edwards and fellow Republican U.S. Senator David Vitter for the governorship vacated by the term-limited Bobby Jindal. In the runoff on November 21, 2015, Edwards won the election over David Vitter with 56.1% of the vote, becoming the first Democratic governor elected in the Deep South since the end of Kathleen Blanco's term in 2008.

Guillory ran last in the October 24 four-candidate primary, having finished with 85,460 votes (7.9 percent). Holden with 360,679 votes (33.3 percent) and Nungesser, who polled 324,654 (30 percent), meet in the November 21 runoff election. John Young ran a strong third with 313,183 votes (28.9 percent). In the 2015 general election Nungesser prevailed, 628,864 votes (55.38 percent) to Holden's 506,578 (44.62 percent). Edwards and Nungesser, of opposite parties, assumed office on January 11, 2016.

== 2016 U.S. House of Representatives campaign ==
On January 22, 2016, Guillory announced his intention to run for Louisiana's 4th congressional district in 2016. Fellow Republican and incumbent John Fleming retired to run for the U.S. Senate seat being vacated by Republican David Vitter. Guillory was eliminated after placing 5th in the jungle primary held on November 8, 2016, with 7% of the vote, thus not making the runoff election.

== Community involvement ==
Guillory has served on the boards of directors for the Saint Landry Parish Chamber of Commerce, the local Salvation Army, the Saint Landry Parish Indigent Defenders, and the Opelousas Daily World newspaper. He is a Rotarian and a supporter of the American Cancer Society. Guillory is a Catholic like his father, being an active member of Holy Ghost Catholic Church in Opelousas.

Elbert Guillory is the brother-in-law of the late Jane Nora "Genore" Guillory (1958–2000), who was brutally murdered in East Feliciana Parish. Senator Guillory and his daughter, Imani Malique Guillory, were interviewed in Investigation Discovery's 2013 Southern Fried Homicide documentary on the murder. Four of Genore's neighbors were convicted in her death.

== See also ==
- List of American politicians who switched parties in office

== Notes ==
Louisiana House of Representatives
Preceded by Don Cravins Jr.	Member of the Louisiana House of Representatives from the 40th district 2007–2009	Succeeded by Ledricka Thierry
Louisiana State Senate
Preceded by Don Cravins Jr.	Member of the Louisiana Senate from the 24th district 2009–2016	Succeeded by Gerald Boudreaux
