= Dixon McMakin =

American politician (born 1986)

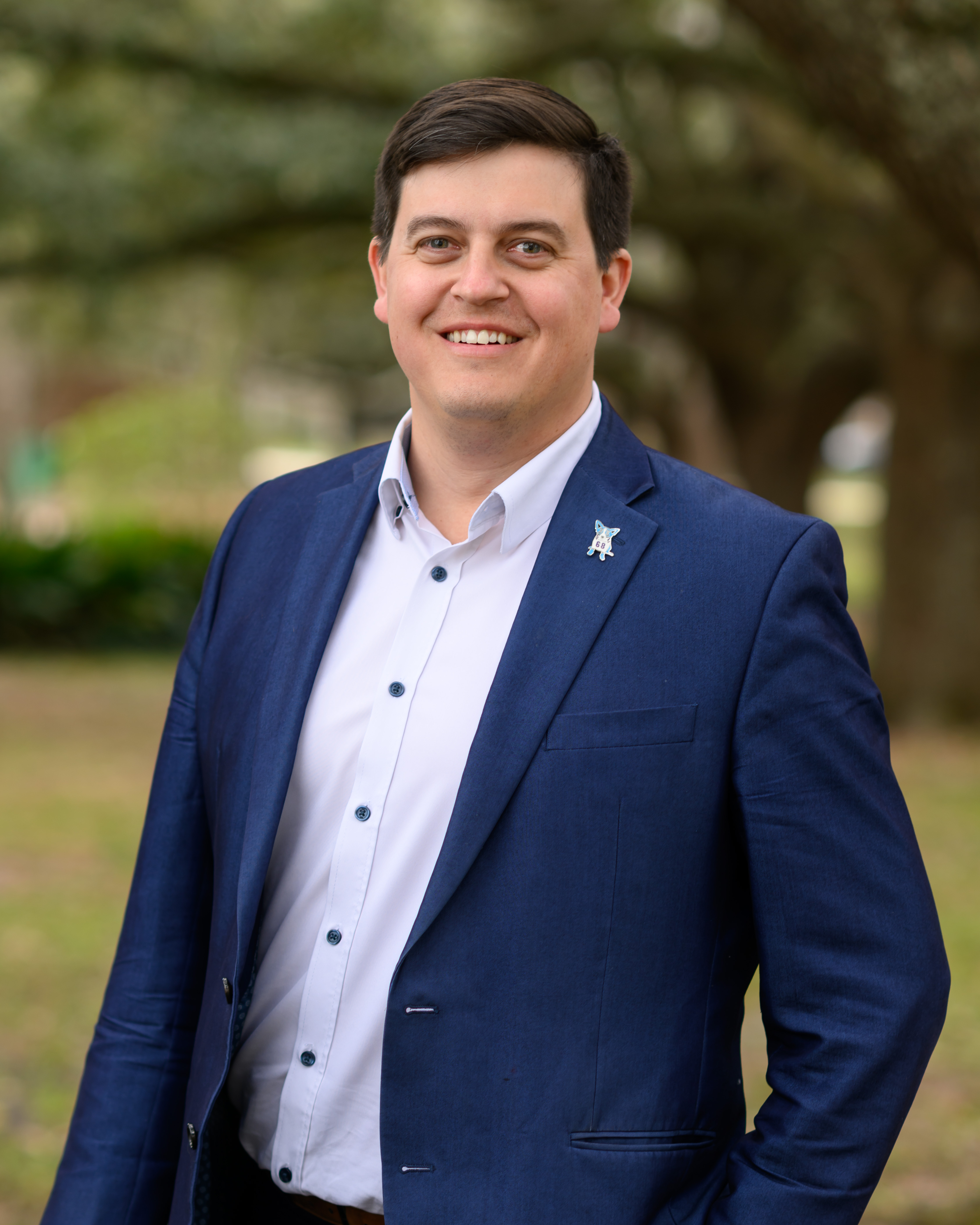

Member of the Louisiana House of Representatives from the 68th district
- Incumbent
- Assumed office January 8, 2024
- Preceded by: Scott McKnight

Personal details
- Born: Dixon Wallace McMakin; August 15, 1986 (age 39) Baton Rouge, Louisiana, U.S.
- Party: Republican
- Spouse: Bess Casserleigh
- Education: Louisiana State University (BA, JD)
- Website: Campaign website

Dixon Wallace McMakin (born August 15, 1986) is an American politician serving as a member of the Louisiana House of Representatives from the 68th district. A member of the Republican Party, McMakin represents parts of East Baton Rouge Parish and has been in office since January 8, 2024.
