= Don Cravins Jr. =

American politician (born 1972)

Donald R. Cravins Jr.
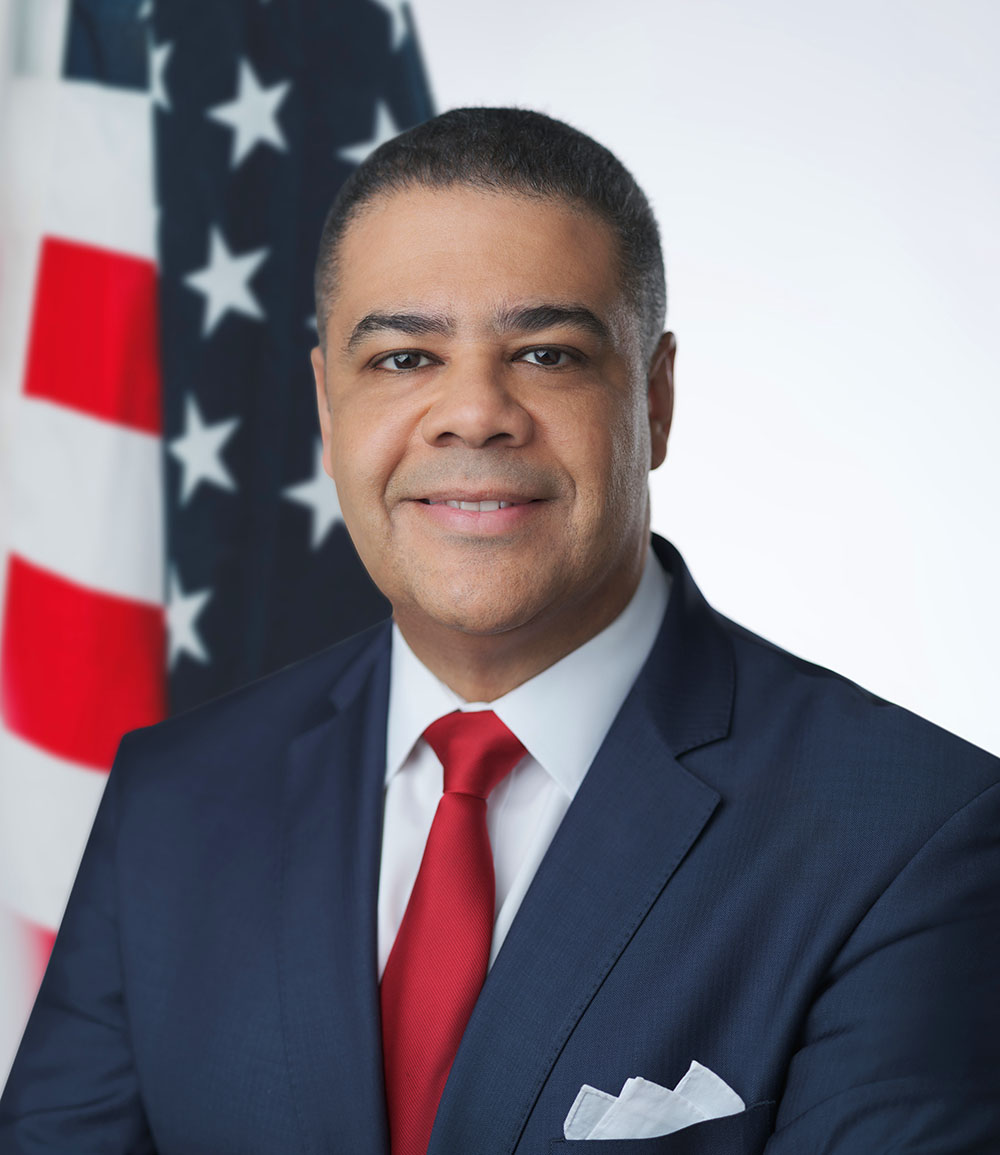

Under Secretary of Commerce for Minority Business Development
- In office August 15, 2022 – January 12, 2024
- President: Joe Biden
- Preceded by: Henry Childs II

Member of the Louisiana State Senate from the 24th district
- In office December 2006 – January 2009
- Preceded by: Donald R. Cravins, Sr.
- Succeeded by: Elbert Guillory

Member of the Louisiana House of Representatives from the 40th district
- In office January 2004 – December 2006
- Preceded by: Charles Hudson
- Succeeded by: Elbert Guillory

Personal details
- Born: Donald R. Cravins Jr. July 31, 1972 (age 53) Houston, Texas, U.S.
- Spouse: Yvette Puckett Cravins
- Children: 3
- Education: Louisiana State University (BA); Southern University (JD)

Military service
- Allegiance: United States
- Branch/service: United States Army
- Years of service: 2011–present
- Rank: Lieutenant Colonel
- Unit: District of Columbia Army National Guard, Judge Advocate General (JAG) Corps

Donald R. Cravins Jr. (born July 31, 1972), is an American attorney and politician who served as the under secretary of commerce for minority business development from 2022 to 2024. He previously served as a member of the Louisiana State Legislature from 2004 to 2009. From April 2021 to August 2022, he was the executive vice president and COO of the National Urban League.

== Early life and education ==
Cravins was born in Houston and raised in St. Landry Parish, Louisiana. He earned a Bachelor of Arts degree in political science from Louisiana State University in 1994 and a Juris Doctor from the Southern University Law Center in 1998.

== Career ==
=== Louisiana legislature ===
Cravins first sought elected office in 2004. On November 2, 2004, he was elected state representative for District 40 in a runoff election where he received 54% of the vote. When he was elected, he and his father, Don Cravins, Sr., made Louisiana history by becoming the first father and son duo to serve in the Louisiana Legislature at the same time. In 2006, Cravins' father resigned from the Louisiana State Senate to become mayor of Opelousas. Cravins Jr. ran unopposed to fill the unexpired term. In the October 20, 2007 election, Don Cravins Jr. was re-elected to the Louisiana State Senate and garnered 74 percent of the vote. He represented Senate District 24 from December 2006 until January 2009. During his tenure in the Senate, Cravins served as chair of the Insurance Committee, vice chair of the Retirement Committee and as an active member of the Juvenile Justice Commission of Louisiana.

=== 2008 Congressional campaign ===
In the 2008 congressional elections, Cravins unsuccessfully ran as the Democratic candidate for Louisiana's 7th congressional district seat held by Republican U.S. Representative Charles Boustany. In addition to Boustany, Cravins faced Constitution Party candidate Peter Vidrine.

=== Later career ===
In a letter dated January 4, 2009, Cravins announced his resignation as state senator to take a position as Staff Director and Chief Counsel of the U.S. Senate Committee on Small Business and Entrepreneurship. Cravins also served as chief of staff to United States Senator Mary Landrieu, a Democrat from New Orleans, from 2013 to 2015.

In 2015, Cravins was named the deputy national political director for the American Israel Public Affairs Committee. On July 7, 2015, he was named the National Urban League's senior vice president for policy and executive director of National Urban League Washington Bureau. In the roles, he was responsible for the Urban League Policy Institute, with primary responsibility for developing the League’s policy, research and advocacy agenda and expanding its impact and influence inside the beltway. He was also devoted to the League’s mission to empower communities through education and economic development.

In February 2019, Cravins left the National Urban League and became Vice President of Policy and External Affairs at Charter Communications, Inc. There he was responsible for building partnerships with external stakeholders to further shared policy objectives. Charter Communications is America’s second largest cable operator in the United States and third largest pay TV operator.

Cravins left Charter in May 2021 to rejoin the National Urban League as Executive Vice President and Chief Operating Officer. As one of the Nation’s leading Civil Rights Organizations, the National Urban League was led by Mr. Cravins who developed its entrepreneurial initiatives and managed its corporate Diversity, Equity, and Inclusion program.

Cravins was an adjunct professor at George Washington University, where he taught independent research in the College of Professional Studies and was an Instructor in the Graduate School of Political Management.

=== Under Secretary of Commerce for Minority Business Development ===
In May 2022, Cravins was nominated by President Joe Biden to serve as the Nation's first Under Secretary of Commerce for Minority Business Development. He was unanimously confirmed by the United States Senate on August 4, 2022. As Under Secretary of Minority Business Development, he leads the Minority Business Development Agency (MBDA) in its service of the nation’s 9.7 million minority business enterprises. After more than 52 years in existence, in 2021 President Biden signed the Minority Business Development Act of 2021 expanding and making permanent MBDA as the United States’ newest federal agency. Cravins resigned from his position in January 2024.

=== Military service ===
He also serves as a lieutenant colonel in the District of Columbia Army National Guard Judge Advocate General (JAG) Corps. He has received two Meritorious Service Medals, three Army Commendation Medals, an Air Force Commendation Medal and Army Achievement Medal for his military service.

=== Current ===
Currently, Cravins serves as the Head of Government Affairs and Outreach for Williams, a Fortune 500 energy company headquartered in Tulsa, Oklahoma, with operations across the natural gas value chain spanning the United States.

== Memberships and honors ==
In 2024, Cravins was named to the inaugural class of the ForbesBLK 50 spotlighting some of the most successful Black Americans as well as pioneering entrepreneurs, activists and innovators. It also honored individuals in the financial sector and clean energy, as well as top executives ranging from the CEO of a nuclear energy company to celebrities winning in business. Cravins has also served on the board of the Energy Foundation and on the advisory board of Poder Latinx. He is a life member of Alpha Phi Alpha fraternity, a life member of The Rocks, Inc., a member of the Greater Washington Urban League Guild and the 100 Black Men of Prince George's County. In 2006, Cravins was selected to serve as King Toussaint L'Ouverture, XLVIII by the Lafayette Mardi Gras Festival, Inc. in Lafayette, Louisiana. His honors include being named 2020 Advocate of the year by the National Bar Association, being inducted into the Southern University Law School Hall of Fame in 2018 and being named a distinguished alumnus of Louisiana State University in 2015.

== Personal life ==
Cravins and his wife, Yvette Puckett Cravins, have three children and reside in Maryland. He is Catholic.

== See also ==
- United States House of Representatives elections in Louisiana, 2008
