= Kyle Ardoin =

Louisiana Secretary of State

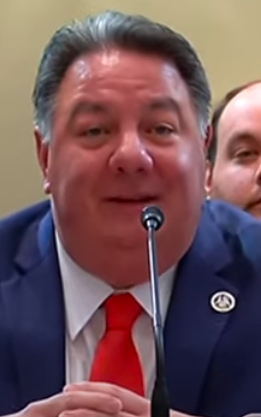

Secretary of State of Louisiana
- In office May 9, 2018 – January 8, 2024; Acting: May 9, 2018 – December 8, 2018
- Governor: John Bel Edwards
- Preceded by: Tom Schedler
- Succeeded by: Nancy Landry

Personal details
- Born: Robert Kyle Ardoin; July 31, 1967 (age 58)
- Party: Republican
- Education: Louisiana State University (BA)

Robert Kyle Ardoin (born July 31, 1967) is an American politician from the state of Louisiana. A Republican, he served as Secretary of State of Louisiana from 2018 to 2024. Ardoin took the post when former Secretary of State Tom Schedler resigned.

== Biography ==
A native of Brusly, Louisiana in West Baton Rouge Parish, Louisiana, Ardoin resides in the capital city of Baton Rouge.

== Political career ==
In 2010, Ardoin became the first assistant secretary of state. On May 9, 2018, he became the acting secretary of state the day after Tom Schedler resigned from office.

In the November 6 nonpartisan blanket primary to fill the remainder of Schedler's term through January 2020, Ardoin received 298,652 votes (20 percent), finishing in first place and advancing to the runoff election, where he faced Democratic candidate Gwen Collins-Greenup, who finished with 289,070 votes (also 20 percent). In the runoff, on December 8, Ardoin defeated Collins-Greenup, 306,538 (59 percent) to 210,080 (41 percent), in a turnout of 17.2 percent of registered voters.

In July 2019, Ardoin hired State Representative Nancy Landry of Lafayette to become his chief of staff. In the 2019 elections, Ardoin defeated Collins-Greenup to secure a full term as secretary of state, 59% to 41%.

In 2021, Ardoin welcomed Phil Waldron, who argued against the certification of Joe Biden's victory in the 2020 presidential election on the basis of false claims of fraud, to speak at a state commission charged with shaping Louisiana’s voting system. Ardoin welcomed Waldron without any mention of Waldron's involvement in efforts to overturn the 2020 election results. Ardoin said, "We're very pleased to have him here and excited to hear what he has to say."

In January 2022, Ardoin announced that Louisiana would suspend its participation in the Electronic Registration Information Center (ERIC), citing “concerns raised by citizens, government watchdog organizations and media reports about potential questionable funding sources and that possibly partisan actors may have access to ERIC network data.” That July, Ardoin’s office issued a letter withdrawing from the ERIC program entirely.

Ardoin did not run for reelection as secretary of state in the 2023 elections.

== Personal life ==
Ardoin is married to the former Betti Lowe, and they have one son.

Party political offices
Preceded by Tom Schedler	Republican nominee for Secretary of State of Louisiana; 2018, 2019	Succeeded by Nancy Landry
Political offices
Preceded by Tom Schedler	Secretary of State of Louisiana; 2018–2024	Succeeded by Nancy Landry
