= Jeremy England (politician) =

American politician

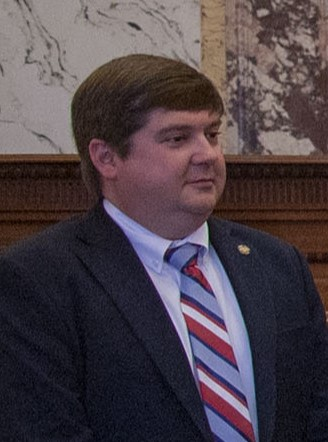

Member of the Mississippi State Senate from the 51st district
- Incumbent
- Assumed office January 7, 2020
- Preceded by: Michael Watson

Personal details
- Born: Jeremy Thomas England; November 11, 1982 (age 43) Ocean Springs, Mississippi, U.S.
- Party: Republican
- Spouse: Melissa England
- Children: 2
- Education: Mississippi State University; University of Mississippi School of Law
- Occupation: Senior attorney

Jeremy Thomas England (born November 11, 1982) is an American politician serving in the Mississippi State Senate from the 51st district since 2020.

== Early life and education ==
England was born in Ocean Springs, Mississippi and attended Pascagoula High School. In high school, he was the first student representative of the Pascagoula City Council Strategic Planning Committee. He served as president of the student council in high school, graduated Top 10 in his class, and was the first of his family to attend college. He graduated from Mississippi State University magna cum laude in the spring of 2005, earning a B.A. degree in Political Science, being recognized as the top Political Science graduate of his class. In late 2005, he entered the University of Mississippi School of Law, graduating in 2008 with a Juris Doctor. He was admitted to the Mississippi Bar on October 2, 2008.

== Career ==
After graduating from law school, England entered into legal practice at Speed, Seta, Martin, Trivett & Stubley, LLC, where he serves as the only attorney from Mississippi. For his active service in Jackson county, he received the Outstanding Young Lawyer of Mississippi Award for 2014–2015. He went on to serve on the Mississippi Bar Young Lawyers Board of Directors, where he was nominated as District Representative to the American Bar Association Young Lawyers Division. From 2012 to 2016, he was named a Mid-South Rising Star by Super Lawyer Magazine. He became a Fellow to the American Bar Foundation in 2015.

England ran for election to the 51st district following incumbent State Senator Michael Watson decision to run for election for Secretary of State of Mississippi. England competed against four others in the Republican primary, ultimately coming in second with 35.9% of the vote. As no candidate reached a majority, he competed against contender Moss Point Alderman Gary Wayne Lennep in the Republican primary runoff, achieving 50.2% of the vote, narrowly winning by 38 votes. Although hesitant to accept the results, Lennep eventually conceded the race.

As of 2020, in the Senate, England serves as vice-chair for the Economic and Workforce Development committee and is a member on the following other committees: Constitution; Finance; Gaming; Highways and Transportation; Judiciary, Division A; Judiciary, Division B; and Ports and Marine Resources.

== Political positions ==
He voted for changing the Mississippi state flag in late June 2020.

== Personal life ==
England has two children and attends a non-denominational church in Ocean Springs. He is a member of the Jackson County Republican Club and a member of the National Rifle Association of America. He also coaches St. Martin Youth Baseball, while his wife, Melissa England, is a player agent.
