= Ledricka Thierry =

American politician

Ledricka Johnson Thierry

Member of the Louisiana House of Representatives from the 40th district
- In office 2009 – January 2016
- Preceded by: Elbert Guillory
- Succeeded by: Dustin Miller

Personal details
- Born: August 1978 (age 48) Place of birth missing
- Party: Democratic
- Spouse: Travis Keane Thierry (born November 1980)
- Education: Southern University; Southern University Law Center
- Occupation: Lawyer

Ledricka Thierry is a Democratic member of the Louisiana House of Representatives, representing the 40th district. In 2011, Thierry introduced a bill to prohibit convicted child sex predators from using social networking sites. She is Catholic.

Louisiana House of Representatives
Preceded by Elbert Guillory	Member of the Louisiana House of Representatives for the 40th district (St. Landry Parish); Ledricka Johnson Thierry; 2009-2016	Succeeded by Dustin Miller
