= Tom Schedler =

American politician

Secretary of State of Louisiana
- In office November 22, 2010 – May 9, 2018; Acting: November 22, 2010 – November 1, 2011
- Governor: Bobby Jindal; John Bel Edwards
- Preceded by: Jay Dardenne
- Succeeded by: Kyle Ardoin

Member of the Louisiana State Senate from the 11th district
- In office January 8, 1996 – January 14, 2008
- Preceded by: Gerry E. Hinton
- Succeeded by: Jack Donahue

Personal details
- Born: John Thomas Schedler; January 24, 1950 (age 76) New Orleans, Louisiana, U.S.
- Party: Republican
- Education: University of Louisiana, Lafayette (BS)

John Thomas Schedler is the former Secretary of State of Louisiana. He resigned in 2018 after sexual harassment accusations were made against him.

In February 2019, he sued the State of Louisiana wanting to be reimbursed attorneys fees and costs in the amount of $14,308 as well as reimbursement for “funds he paid in the original case.”

Schedler previously served in the Louisiana State Senate.

Party political offices
Preceded by Jay Dardenne	Republican nominee for Secretary of State of Louisiana; 2015	Succeeded by Kyle Ardoin
Political offices
Preceded by Jay Dardenne	Secretary of State of Louisiana; 2010–2018; Acting: 2010–2011	Succeeded by Kyle Ardoin
