= Mike Francis (politician) =

American politician

Member of the Louisiana Public Service Commission from the 4th district
- Incumbent
- Assumed office January 3, 2017
- Preceded by: Charles DeWitt

Chair of the Louisiana Republican Party
- In office October 1994 – March 2000
- Preceded by: Dud Lastrapes
- Succeeded by: Chuck McMains

Personal details
- Born: Michael Gordon Francis; 1946 (age 79–80) Jena, Louisiana, U.S.
- Party: Republican
- Children: 2

Michael Gordon Francis (born in 1946, Louisiana) is an American politician and businessman from Crowley, Louisiana. He is currently a member of the Louisiana Public Service Commission from the 4th district. Prior to his election to the Public Service Commission, he was the Chairman of the Republican Party of Louisiana from 1994 until 2000.

== Early life ==
Francis was born in Jena, LaSalle Parish, Louisiana. He attended local public schools and Jena High School, graduating from the latter in 1964. In the 1960s he began working as a truck driver and drilling fluid engineer. He then moved to Crowley and founded his own drilling fluid company, Francis Drilling Fluids, in 1977. He married Sheila Stevens and had two sons with her.

== Political career ==
=== Party offices ===
Francis identifies as a fiscal and social conservative. He was elected to the State Central Committee of the Louisiana Republican Party in November 1992 and was shortly thereafter made its finance chairman. He was elected chairman of the state party in October 1994. From 1995 onward, he grew involved in a leadership dispute between the party's Christian conservative wing—which he led—and the moderate wing led by Louisiana Governor Mike Foster. That year the State Central Committee voted to abolish the state's Republican presidential primary and replace it with caucuses to be held a week before the 1996 Iowa caucuses, which had long been the earliest-held caucuses in election cycles in the country. Francis supported the move, arguing it would improve the image of the state Republican Party and boost the influence of the South in national Republican politics. Iowa Republicans suspected that the change was designed to improve the prospects of Phil Gramm, Francis' preferred candidate. Most of the major Republican candidates skipped the caucuses, which were won by Pat Buchanan. Challenged by Republicans upset with the caucuses, he narrowly won a 1996 central committee run-off vote to retain his chairmanship. In 1997 the Louisiana State Legislature unanimously passed a bill adding six seats to the central committee. Fearful that the new seats would be filled by moderates and thus undo the majority the Christian conservatives had on the committee, Francis called on Republican State Senate leader John J. Hainkel Jr. to resign and sued the governor to have the bill reversed.

In 1999 Francis became involved in another dispute between the party's wings after he supported another proposal to schedule an early presidential caucus before the 2000 Iowa caucuses. He passed the motion to schedule the early caucuses after ignoring quorum calls and the objections of moderates. He dismissed the state Republican executive director and deputy executive director two days later and changed the locks on the Republican headquarters building. In response, the State Council of the Republican Party—which was responsible for the party's finances—removed his check-writing, hiring, and firing privileges. Governor Foster asked the central committee to reconsider its caucuses scheduling and return to the use of a primary election, but Francis refused, saying "Our honor is at stake." Iowa Republicans convinced most major presidential candidates to declare their abstention from the caucuses. In December, Foster's allies overruled Francis in a meeting of the central committee and canceled the caucuses. Francis' preferred candidate, Gary Bauer, lost the subsequent primary. Francis decided to not seek the central committee chairmanship in 2000 but still sought a seat on the committee. He was defeated in the March committee elections as was his preferred successor to the chair.

=== Elections and public office ===
In 1996 Francis launched a candidacy in a special election to win the vacant state senate seat for the 25th district. He campaigned on "smaller government" and lowering taxes, placing second in the first election to State Representative Gerald Theunissen, a Democrat. A run-off election was held in September which he lost. He lost a special election to become the Louisiana Secretary of State to fellow Republican Jay Dardenne in September 2006. He ran again for the office in 2023 but was defeated in the first open primary.

In the November 2016 elections, Francis won a seat on the Louisiana Public Service Commission for the 4th district, garnering 175,074 votes (54 percent) and defeating two other candidates. The district includes Acadia, Avoyelles, Beauregard, Calcasieu, Cameron, Evangeline, Grant, Jefferson Davis, LaSalle, Rapides, St. Landry, Vermilion and Vernon parishes in whole, as well as parts of Catahoula, Iberia and Sabine parishes. He was sworn in on January 3, 2017 for a term lasting until December 31, 2022. He was elected by the commission to serve as its chairman for the 2019 term.

== Works cited ==
- Lamis, Alexander P., ed. (1999). Southern Politics in the 1990s. Louisiana State University Press. ISBN 9780807166765.
- Maisel, L. Sandy, ed. (2002). The Parties Respond: Changes in the American Party System (4th ed.). Westview Press. ISBN 9780813364551.
- Steed, Robert P.; Moreland, Laurence W., eds. (2002). The 2000 Presidential Election in the South: Partisanship and Southern Party Systems in the 21st Century. Greenwood Publishing Group. ISBN 9780275970208.

Party political offices
Preceded by Dud Lastrapes	Chair of the Louisiana Republican Party; 1994–2000	Succeeded by Chuck McMains
