= Gerald Boudreaux =

American politician

Minority Leader of the Louisiana Senate
- Incumbent
- Assumed office May 10, 2021
- Preceded by: Troy Carter

Member of the Louisiana Senate from the 24th district
- Incumbent
- Assumed office January 11, 2016
- Preceded by: Elbert Guillory

Personal details
- Born: September 16, 1960 (age 65) Houston, Texas, U.S.
- Party: Democratic
- Education: University of Louisiana, Lafayette (BS)

Gerald Boudreaux is an American politician who hails from Lafayette, Louisiana. He is affiliated with the Democratic Party and has been representing District 24 in the Louisiana State Senate since 2016.

== Career ==
Before entering elected office, Boudreaux served as the director of Parks and Recreation in Lafayette, Louisiana, a position he held until his resignation in 2020. His resignation came after Mayor-President of Lafayette, Josh Guillory, imposed a 35% budget cut on his department over two years. Boudreaux is an active member of several boards, including the Louisiana Sports Hall of Fame, Miles Perret Cancer Services Center, Franciscan Missionaries of Our Lady Health System, and the Martin Luther King Jr. Holiday Committee. On August 7, 2023, Boudreaux announced his candidacy for re-election to the Louisiana State Senate.

== Elections ==
=== 2015 ===
In the 2015 Louisiana State Senate election, Boudreaux emerged victorious in the 24th Senatorial District as a Democratic Party candidate, securing 26.10% of the votes.

=== 2019 ===
In the 2019 Louisiana State Senate election, Boudreaux was re-elected as a Democratic Party candidate in the 24th Senatorial District, securing 75.50% of the votes.

== NCAA basketball ==
Before his political career, Boudreaux served as an NCAA College Basketball Official from 1984 to 2006. He later became the supervisor of Men's Basketball Officials for the Southeastern Conference from 2006 to 2013. Boudreaux officiated five Final Four games and the championship games of 1997, 1999, 2000, 2001, and 2003.

== Personal life ==
Boudreaux is Catholic.

Louisiana State Senate
Preceded by Elbert Guillory	Member of the Louisiana Senate from the 24th district 2016–present	Incumbent
Preceded by Troy Carter	Minority Leader of the Louisiana Senate; 2021–present	Incumbent
