= Scott McKnight =

American politician (born 1980)

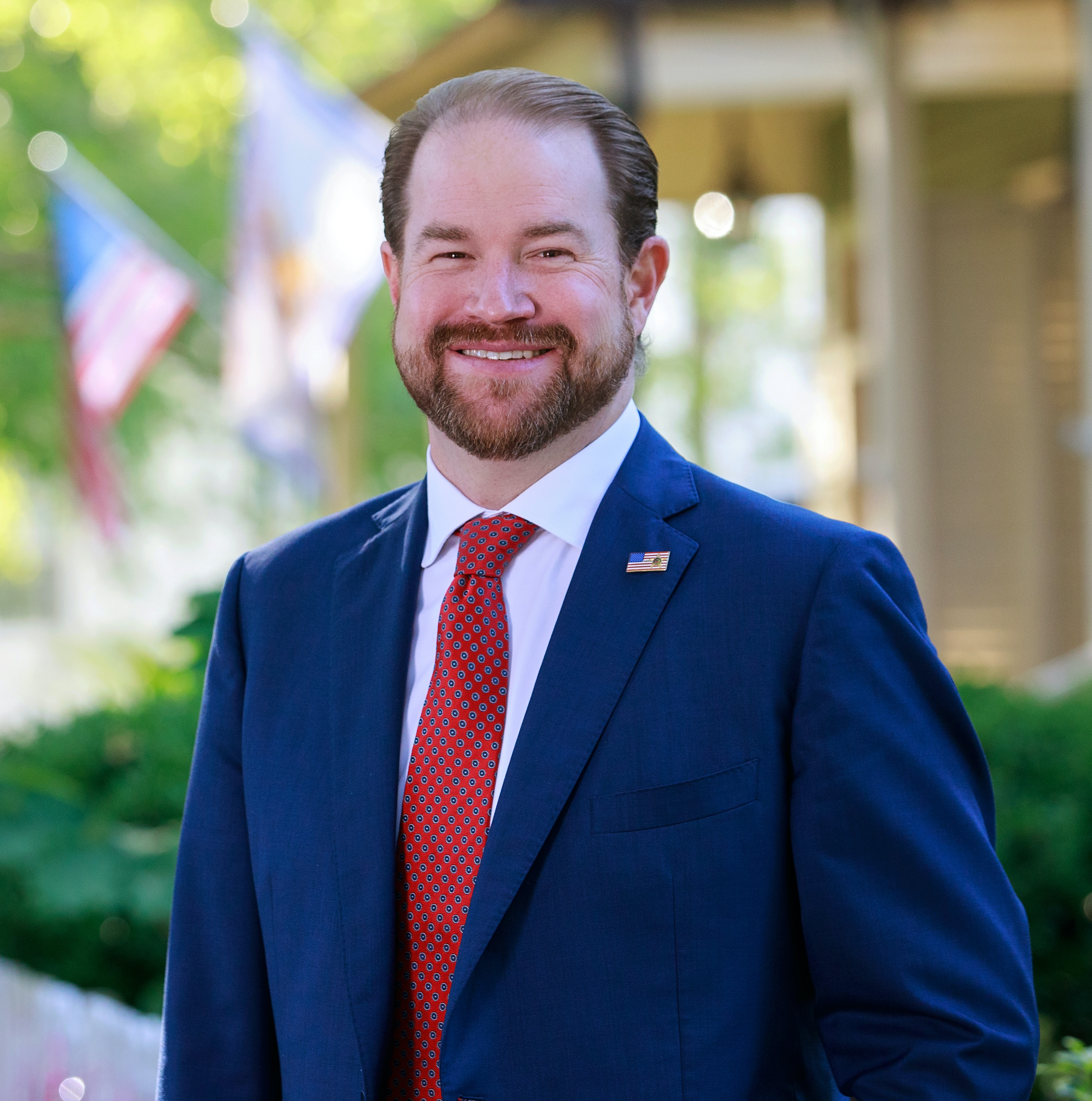

Member of the Louisiana House of Representatives from the 68th district
- In office January 13, 2020 – January 8, 2024
- Preceded by: Stephen Carter
- Succeeded by: Dixon McMakin

Personal details
- Born: November 20, 1980 (age 45) Baton Rouge, Louisiana, U.S.
- Party: Republican
- Spouse: Elizabeth McKnight
- Children: 3
- Education: Louisiana State University (BA, MBA)

Scott McKnight is an American Republican politician who served as a member of the Louisiana House of Representatives for the 68th district from 2020 through 2024.

== Early life and education ==
McKnight was born and raised in Baton Rouge, Louisiana. He earned a Bachelor of General Studies and Master of Business Administration from Louisiana State University.

== Career ==
Professional Experience

McKnight joined BXS Insurance as a benefits consultant in 1999. He has since worked as vice president, director of business development, and president of the company. Scott works as Vice President and Director of Business Development at Cadence Insurance managing over $1 billion in annual premium revenue.

Volunteer Experience

McKnight has previously served as a board member for Companion Animal Alliance, Louisiana Art & Science Museum, Foundation for Woman's Hospital, and the Louisiana State University Museum of Art. Currently, he serves as a board member for Caddo Medical Products LLC. and Pelican Chapter- Associated Builders and Contractors.

Scott also volunteered his time as a Reserve Deputy with the East Baton Rouge Sheriff’s Office from 2011 to 2020.

== Louisiana Republican Party ==
Republican State Central Committee

Scott McKnight currently serves as the Republican State Central Committee Member for district 16D which primarily covers East Baton Rouge Parish.

Republican Parish Executive Committee

McKnight Currently Serves as a Member-At-Large for the East Baton Rouge Republican Parish Executive Committee Member.

== Louisiana State Representative ==
Election

McKnight was elected to the Louisiana House of Representatives in November 2019 and sworn in to the Louisiana House of Representatives January 13, 2020.

Committee Assignments

- Commerce
- Municipal, Parochial and Cultural Affairs
- Natural Resources and Environment
- House Select Committee on Disaster Recovery

Caucuses and Delegations

- Capital Region Legislative Delegation
- Louisiana Republican Legislative Delegation

== Louisiana State Treasurer ==
In June 2022, McKnight declared his candidacy for Louisiana state treasurer.
