= Michael Watson (Mississippi politician) =

American politician (born 1977)

36th Secretary of State of Mississippi
- Incumbent
- Assumed office January 9, 2020
- Governor: Tate Reeves
- Preceded by: Delbert Hosemann

Member of the Mississippi Senate from the 51st district
- In office January 8, 2008 – January 7, 2020
- Preceded by: Tommy Robertson
- Succeeded by: Jeremy England

Personal details
- Born: December 22, 1977 (age 48) Pascagoula, Mississippi, U.S.
- Party: Republican
- Education: University of Mississippi (BBA, JD)

Michael D. Watson Jr. (born December 22, 1977) is an American politician and the incumbent Secretary of State of Mississippi. A Republican, he previously represented the 51st district in the Mississippi State Senate from 2008 to 2020.

== Career ==
Watson is an attorney from Pascagoula, Mississippi. He ran in the 2007 Mississippi elections for the state senate against Tommy Robertson, and won. Watson considered running for governor of Mississippi in the 2015 Mississippi gubernatorial election, but opted to run for reelection instead.

While in the Mississippi Senate, Watson voted against legislation that would make it easier for college students in Mississippi to vote with absentee ballots; under the legislation, students would have been allowed to use college registrars as witnesses for their absentee ballot application.

In the 2019 Mississippi elections, Watson ran for Secretary of State of Mississippi. He defeated Sam Britton in the Republican primary, and defeated Johnny DuPree in the general election on November 5. He was sworn-in to the office on January 9, 2020.

In a television interview on March 26, 2021, Watson expressed concern that "woke" college students in Mississippi, among others, would vote, falsely claiming that an Executive Order by President Biden on March 6, 2021, would automatically register people to vote. Watson also falsely claimed that people would be sneakily registered without their knowledge.

After considering challenging Tate Reeves in the 2023 Mississippi gubernatorial election, Watson elected instead to run for reelection. He defeated Democrat Ty Pinkins to win a second term.

Watson announced his intention to run for lieutenant governor for the 2027 election in April 2026. He kicked off the announcement with a speaking campaign.

In April 2026, Watson made a $50,000 deal to use data from the credit reporting agency Experian in Mississippi voter rolls. In November 2026, after the online newsroom Mississippi Today reported on how 1/9th of voters were reported as inactive, Watson responded to a Facebook post, stating that it doesn't mater what data was sent to the election commissioners, and that they upgraded to a new vendor, later reported to be IDI Data.

Party political offices
Preceded by Delbert Hosemann	Republican nominee for Secretary of State of Mississippi; 2019, 2023	Most recent
Political offices
Preceded by Delbert Hosemann	Secretary of State of Mississippi; 2020–present	Incumbent
