= Republican Party of Louisiana =

Louisiana affiliate of the Republican Party

Republican Party of Louisiana Parti Républicain de Louisiane
- Chairperson: Derek Babcock
- Governor of Louisiana: Jeff Landry
- Founded: 1865
- Headquarters: 530 Lakeland Dr. Baton Rouge, Louisiana, 70802
- Membership (July 1, 2026): 1,033,546
- Ideology: Conservatism (US); Right-wing populism
- Colors: Red
- Louisiana House of Representatives: 73 / 105
- Louisiana State Senate: 28 / 39
- Statewide Executive Offices: 7 / 7
- United States House of Representatives: 4 / 6
- U.S. Senate: 2 / 2^{A}
- Louisiana Public Service Commission: 3 / 5
- Louisiana Supreme Court: 5 / 7

Election symbol

Website
- www.lagop.com

The Republican Party of Louisiana (LAGOP) (French: Parti républicain de Louisiane, Spanish: Partido Republicano de Luisiana) is the affiliate of the Republican Party in the U.S. state of Louisiana. Its chair is Derek Babcock who was elected in 2024. It is currently the dominant party in the state, controlling four of Louisiana's six U.S. House seats, both U.S. Senate seats, all statewide executive offices, and both houses of the state legislature.

== History ==
The Republican Party of Louisiana was founded as the "Friends of Universal Suffrage" on November 4, 1865, by a group of whites, free men of color, and newly emancipated freedmen led by Benjamin Flanders. He had been an Alderman of New Orleans from 1847 to 1852. Constitutional amendments after the American Civil War granted citizenship and suffrage to freedmen, most of whom affiliated with the Republican Party that had gained their freedom. Among the achievements of the biracial state legislature during the Reconstruction era was founding public education and some charitable institutions.

The party held a convention in June 1867, during which the party was divided between a pro-civil rights wing seeking integration and a wing led by Henry C. Warmoth. That same month James Longstreet joined the party.

Threatened by black majorities in several areas and unhappy with the outcome of the war, white insurgents challenged voting by blacks, and elections were increasingly disrupted by violence and fraud in the period of 1868 through the Reconstruction era. Chapters of the White League arose across the state in the 1874 as a white militia that worked for the Democratic Party to achieve the overthrow of the Reconstruction government. Notable extreme events of white violence against blacks in this period were the Colfax Massacre and the Coushatta Massacre. In addition, armed Democratic forces of the White League occupied New Orleans and took over state offices (then located in the city) after the disputed gubernatorial election of 1872.

In 1898 the Democratic-dominated Louisiana legislature followed Mississippi (and other Southern states) in passing a new constitution and laws with provisions that created barriers to voter registration and voting by blacks in the state, and also adversely affected many poor whites. These provisions included a poll tax, literacy test, grandfather clauses and similar requirements that were applied in a discriminatory manner against African Americans. They were essentially excluded from the political system for decades, depleting the Republican Party. The Democratic white-dominated state legislature passed racial segregation and other Jim Crow laws that enforced second-class status for African Americans.

Disenfranchisement of African Americans kept the Republican Party hollowed out well into the 20th century. In the first part of the 20th century up to 1970, tens of thousands of blacks left Louisiana for northern and western states in the Great Migration, contributing to changes in demographics of some areas of the state. As leaders of the national Democratic Party had supported the civil rights movement, after African Americans regained the power to vote and re-entered politics, most affiliated with the Democratic Party.

Since the late 20th century, the Republican Party in Louisiana and other southern states has had a resurgence fed by the movement of white conservatives from the Democratic Party to its ranks. This change was seen first in their voting for Republican presidential candidates, in states across the South.

Until the early 1950s, when blacks were still disenfranchised, no Republican won a single electoral vote in any Louisiana presidential election. But in 1956, the state supported national hero and Republican presidential candidate General Dwight David Eisenhower, who was admired for his leadership in World War II. His was the first of nine Republican presidential victories in the state among the 14 presidential campaigns from 1956 to 2008 inclusive.

Since the 1990s, Louisiana's U.S. House delegation has overall had a Republican tilt, and the number of Republicans elected to both houses of the Louisiana legislature has increased incrementally. As of 2009, Republicans had not had the majority in either the Louisiana House or state Senate since the Reconstruction era. The first Republicans elected to the state house in Louisiana in the 20th century were Morley A. Hudson and Taylor W. O'Hearn in 1964, the year that the federal Civil Rights Act of 1964 was passed. The next year the Voting Rights Act of 1965 was passed, ensuring that African Americans would again be able to exercise their constitutional right to vote in Louisiana and other states. The first Republican elected to the State Senate in Louisiana in the 20th century was Edwards Barham in 1975.

Although it was years before Republicans commanded a majority of the state house, they often secured important leadership posts. A notable example is John Hainkel, the first person in U.S. history to have been elected by his peers in any state legislature as both Speaker of the House and as President of the Senate.

David C. Treen was elected as governor in 1979; he was the first Republican elected to the office since the Reconstruction era. Charlton Lyons had made the first serious Republican gubernatorial campaign in 1964, when blacks were still disenfranchised. He drew a then record 37.5 percent of the general white election vote. Drawing on increasing support in the state, Republicans have won the Louisiana governorship most of the time since Treen's election.

In 2004 David Vitter, a U.S. representative, was elected as Louisiana's first Republican United States Senator since the Reconstruction era, disenfranchisement at the turn of the century, and realignment of political parties in the state. As of 2010 the Republican Party holds all of the statewide elected offices, which include Governor Bobby Jindal, Lieutenant Governor Jay Dardenne, Secretary of State Tom Schedler, State Treasurer John Neely Kennedy, Attorney General Buddy Caldwell, Commissioner of Agriculture & Forestry Mike Strain, and Commissioner of Insurance Jim Donelon.

In 2009 election of Republican former U.S. Representative Clyde C. Holloway to the Louisiana Public Service Commission (PSC), which regulates utility companies, gave that body its first-ever Republican majority. In 2010, Republicans gained a majority of both houses of the Louisiana state legislature for the first time since Reconstruction, when party affiliations were quite different.

In 1992, the Louisiana Republican Party refused to censure its member, David Duke, who was a former leader of the white supremacist terrorist organization Ku Klux Klan and who was known for racist views. Though in 2016, they did denounce him as he announced his campaign for the U.S. Senate.

In 2021, the Louisiana Republican Party censured Senator Bill Cassidy for voting to convict Donald Trump in the impeachment trial over Trump's role in inciting a pro-Trump mob to storm the U.S. Capitol.

In January 2023 the party voted to condemn the Biden Administration's prisoner exchange with Russia for Brittney Griner. Though it was later taken out, many members wanted to add language to the resolution describing Griner as "LGBT woke".

== Organization ==
The Republican Party of Louisiana is represented by its 144-member State Central Committee, which is established in the Louisiana Election Code, essentially Title 18 of the Louisiana Revised Statutes (LRS). LRS Title 18 also provides for the Parish Executive Committee within each civil parish (county). The 144 members are based on the 105 state representatives and 39 state senators. Both committees are elected by party members in public elections set by law. Although not naming the parties, the Louisiana Election Code describes them in terms of requirements to be counted among the "recognized political parties." Besides the Republican Party, the only other party which routinely meets these requirements is the Democratic Party. Within each civil parish a representative of each recognized party's Parish Executive Committee serves on the Parish Board of Election Supervisors.

The State Central Committee attempts to coordinate the efforts of the parish executive committees and related organizations.

== Current elected officials ==
The Republican Party of Louisiana controls all of the seven of the statewide constitutional offices and holds a majority in the Louisiana House of Representatives and in the Louisiana Senate. The party also holds both of the state's U.S. Senate seats and four of the six U.S. House seats.

=== Members of Congress ===
==== U.S. Senate ====
Republicans have controlled both of Louisiana's seats in the U.S. Senate since 2015:

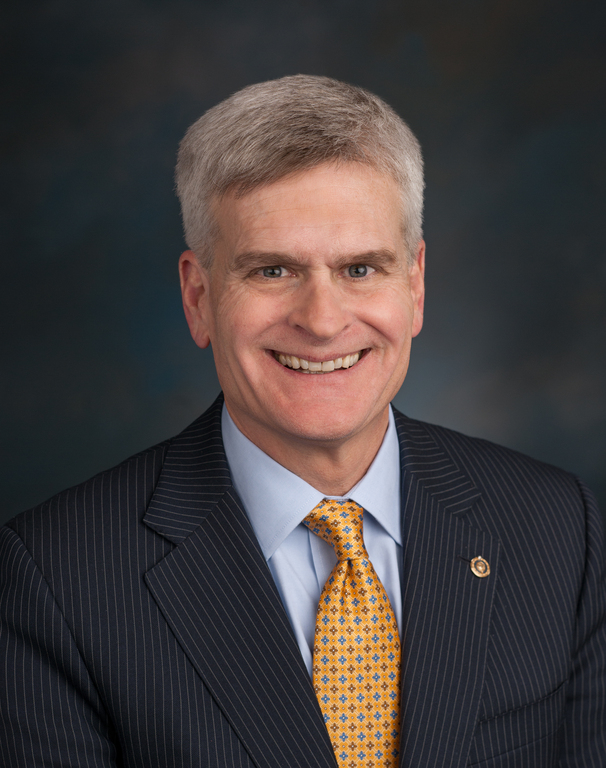
Senior U.S. Senator Bill Cassidy

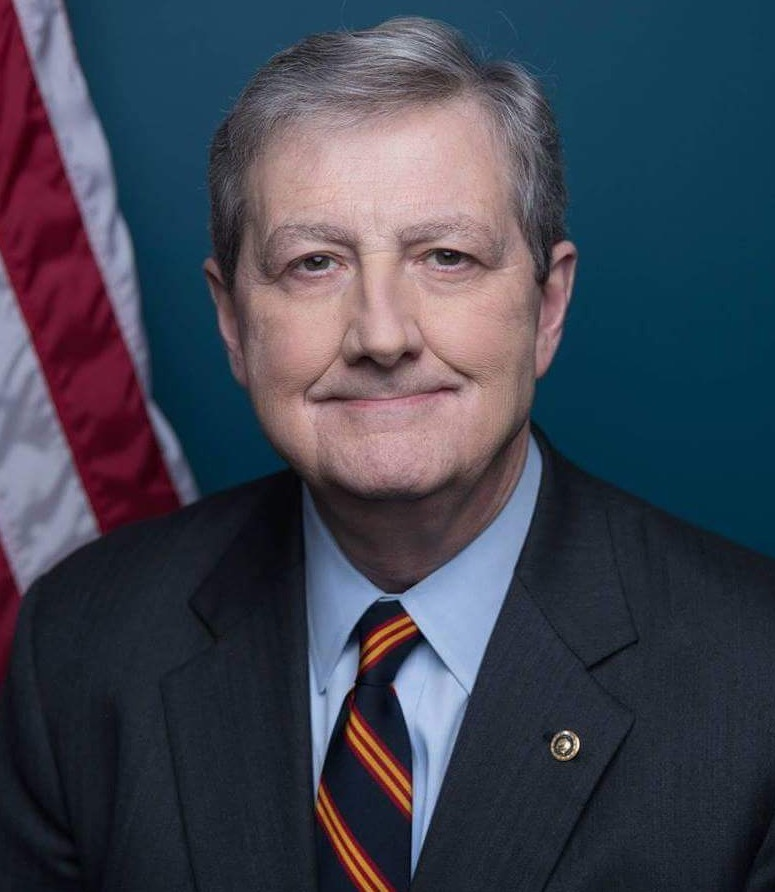
Junior U.S. Senator John Kennedy

Junior U.S. Senator-elect Julia Letlow

==== U.S. House of Representatives ====
Out of the 6 seats Louisiana is apportioned in the U.S. House of Representatives, 4 are held by Republicans:

District	Member	Photo
LA-01	Steve Scalise (House Majority Leader)	
LA-03	Clay Higgins	
LA-04	Mike Johnson (Speaker of the House)	
LA-05	Julia Letlow	

=== Statewide offices ===
Republicans control all of the seven elected statewide offices:

- Governor of Louisiana: Jeff Landry
- Lieutenant Governor: Billy Nungesser
- Attorney General: Liz Murrill
- Secretary of State: Nancy Landry
- Commissioner of Agriculture and Forestry: Mike Strain
- Commissioner of Insurance: Tim Temple
- State Treasurer: John Fleming

=== State legislative leaders ===
- President of the Senate: Cameron Henry
  - Majority Leader: Jeremy Stine
- Speaker of the House: Phillip DeVillier
  - Speaker Pro Tempore: Michael T. Johnson
  - Majority Leader: Mark Wright

== List of State Republican chairmen ==
- John E. Jackson (1929–1934)
- LeRoy Smallenberger (1960–1964)
- Charlton Lyons (1964–1968)
- Charles deGravelles (1968–1972)
- James H. Boyce (1972–1976)
- John H. Cade, Jr. (1976–1978)
- George Despot (1978–1985)
- Donald G. Bollinger (1986–1988)
- William "Billy" Nungesser (1988–1992)
- Dud Lastrapes (1992–1994)
- Mike Francis (1994–2000)
- Chuck McMains (2000)
- Pat Brister (2000–2004)
- Roger F. Villere, Jr. (2004–2018)
- Louis Gurvich (2018–2024 )
- Derek Babcock (2024–)

== Electoral history ==
=== Gubernatorial ===
Louisiana Republican Party gubernatorial election results
Election	Gubernatorial candidate	Votes	Vote %	Result
1991	David Duke	671,009	38.83%	Lost ✗
1995	Mike Foster	984,499	63.5%	Won ✓
1999	Mike Foster	805,203	62.17%	Won ✓
2003	Bobby Jindal	676,484	48.05%	Lost ✗
2007	Bobby Jindal	699,672	53.91%	Won ✓
2011	Bobby Jindal	673,239	65.80%	Won ✓
2015	David Vitter	505,940	43.89%	Lost ✗
2019	Eddie Rispone	734,286	48.67%	Lost ✗
2023	Jeff Landry	547,827	51.56%	Won ✓

== Works cited ==
- Abbott, Richard (1986). The Republican Party and the South, 1855–1877: The First Southern Strategy. University of North Carolina Press. ISBN 0807816809.

== Notes ==
A.Although Louisiana's senior US Senator Bill Cassidy is a member of the Senate Republican Conference, the Party's Louisiana affiliate has censured him.
