= 2023 Louisiana House of Representatives election =

- October 14, 2023; November 18, 2023 (runoff)

All 105 seats in the Louisiana House of Representatives 53 seats needed for a majority
	Majority party	Minority party
Leader	Clay Schexnayder (term-limited)	Sam Jenkins (retired)
Party	Republican	Democratic
Leader since	January 13, 2020	January 13, 2020
Leader's seat	81st district	2nd district
Seats before	71	33
Seats won	73	32
Seat change	▲2	▼1
Popular vote	398,222	155,795
Percentage	70.94%	27.75%
- Results: Republican gain Republican hold Democratic hold
Speaker before election
Clay Schexnayder
Republican
Elected Speaker
Phillip DeVillier
Republican

The 2023 Louisiana House of Representatives election was held on October 14, 2023, with runoff elections held on November 18, 2023. All 105 seats in the Louisiana House of Representatives were up for election to four-year terms. It was held concurrently with elections for all statewide offices and the Louisiana State Senate.

Under Louisiana's jungle primary system, all candidates appear on the same ballot, regardless of party, and voters may vote for any candidate, regardless of their party affiliation.

== Background ==
In the 2019 state legislature elections, Republicans expanded their majorities in both chambers to 68 in the House and 27 in the Senate. By March 17, they had a supermajority of 71 members in the House, after elected Democrats Malinda White, Francis C. Thompson and Jeremy LaCombe switched parties. The supermajority, in combination with the supermajority Republicans held in the Louisiana Senate, made it significantly easier for Republicans to overturn vetoes from Democratic governor John Bel Edwards.

In the 2020 presidential election, Republican Donald Trump won 72 Louisiana House of Representatives districts and Democrat Joe Biden won 33 districts. Going into the 2023 Louisiana State House elections, Democrats represented two districts where Trump won the most votes in 2020: District 60, located in rural Louisiana (Trump +9%) and District 105, located primarily in Plaquemines Parish (Trump + 6%). Going into the 2023 elections, Republicans represented one district where Biden won the most votes in 2020: District 92, in the New Orleans suburbs of Jefferson County (Biden + 8%). In addition, the Independent Joseph Marino had represented District 85, which Biden won by 8%, before he resigned in 2023.

Biden 50–60% 60–70% 70–80% 80–90% 90–100% / Trump 50–60% 60–70% 70–80% 80–90%

The 2023 election was the first election held under new district maps following redistricting as a result of the 2020 census.

== Predictions ==
Source	Ranking	As of
270toWin	Safe R	November 2, 2023
Elections Daily	Safe R	November 2, 2023

== Overview ==
↓
73	32
Republican	Democratic

Parties	Candidates	Votes		Seats		
Parties	Candidates	No.	%	Before	After	+/-
Republican	124	398,222	70.94%	71	73	▲2
Democratic	76	155,795	27.75%	33	32	▼1
Independent	2	3,409	0.61%	1	0	
No party	5	3,135	0.56%	1	0	▼1
Libertarian	1	772	0.14%	0	0	
Total	208	561,333	100.00%	105	105	

== Special elections ==
One special election was held on February 18, 2023, with a runoff on March 25, 2023, to fill a vacancy in District 93. Incumbent Democrat Royce Duplessis resigned on December 6, 2022, to join the State Senate. Democrat Alonzo Knox won this election.

District	Incumbent			Candidates	Results
District	Member	Party	First elected	Candidates	Results
93	Royce Duplessis	Democratic	2018 (special)	▌ ✓ Alonzo Knox (Democratic) 54.3%; ▌Sibil Fox Richardson (Democratic) 45.7%; First round: ▌ Sibil Fox Richardson (Democratic) 37.2%; ▌ Alonzo Knox (Democratic) 30.6%; ▌Steven Kennedy (Democratic) 10.5%; ▌Morgan Clevenger (Democratic) 10.3%; ▌Matthew Hill (Republican) 7.0%; ▌Naj Wallace (Democratic) 4.4%	Democratic hold

== Retirements ==
Thirty incumbents did not seek re-election.

=== Democrats ===
1. District 2: Sam Jenkins retired to successfully run for State Senate.
2. District 4: Cedric Glover retired to run for State Senate.
3. District 11: Patrick O. Jefferson was term-limited.
4. District 23: Kenny R. Cox was term-limited.
5. District 44: Vincent Pierre was term-limited.
6. District 57: Randal Gaines was term-limited.

=== Republicans ===
1. District 5: Alan Seabaugh was term-limited (successfully ran for State Senate).
2. District 6: Thomas Pressly retired to successfully run for State Senate.
3. District 25: Lance Harris was term-limited (successfully ran for Board of Elementary and Secondary Education).
4. District 42: John Stefanski retired to run for attorney general.
5. District 43: Stuart Bishop was term-limited.
6. District 45: Jean-Paul Coussan retired to successfully run for State Senate.
7. District 46: Mike Huval was term-limited.
8. District 49: Blake Miguez retired to successfully run for State Senate.
9. District 53: Tanner Magee retired.
10. District 56: Gregory A. Miller was term-limited (successfully ran for State Senate).
11. District 64: Valarie Hodges was term-limited (successfully ran for State Senate).
12. District 65: Barry Ivey retired to run for State Senate.
13. District 66: Rick Edmonds retired to successfully run for State Senate.
14. District 68: Scott McKnight retired to run for treasurer.
15. District 71: Buddy Mincey Jr. retired to run for State Senate.
16. District 73: William Wheat Jr. retired to successfully run for State Senate.
17. District 74: Larry Frieman retired to run for judge in the 22nd Judicial District.
18. District 75: Malinda White retired to run for Washington Parish President.
19. District 76: Bob Owen retired to successfully run for State Senate.
20. District 81: Clay Schexnayder was term-limited (ran for secretary of state).
21. District 89: Richard Nelson retired to run for governor.
22. District 95: Sherman Q. Mack was term-limited.
23. District 103: Ray Garofalo was term-limited (ran for State Senate).
24. District 104: Paul Hollis was term-limited (successfully ran for Board of Elementary and Secondary Education).

== Resignation ==
One seat was left vacant on the day of the general election due to a resignation in 2023.

=== Independents ===
1. District 85: Joseph A. Marino III resigned August 21 to become a Twenty-fourth Judicial District Court judge.

== Incumbents defeated ==
=== In primary election ===
One incumbent representative, a Republican, was defeated in the October 14 jungle primary.

==== Republicans ====
1. District 31: Jonathan Goudeau lost renomination to Troy Hebert.

=== In general election ===
Two incumbent representatives, one Democrat and one Republican, were defeated in the November 18 general election.

==== Democrats ====
===== Seat lost to a Republican challenger =====
1. District 105: Mack Cormier lost re-election to Jacob Braud.

==== Republicans ====
===== Seat held by a Republican =====
1. District 90: Mary DuBuisson lost re-election to Brian Glorioso.

== Results ==
=== District 1 ===
2023 Louisiana's 1st State House district election
Primary election
Party	Candidate	Votes	%
Republican	Danny McCormick (incumbent)	6,184	66.37
Republican	Randall Liles	3,134	33.63
Total votes		9,318	100

=== District 2 ===
2023 Louisiana's 2nd State House district election
Primary election
Party	Candidate	Votes	%
Democratic	Steven Jackson	2,666	51.55
Democratic	Terence Vinson	2,506	48.45
Total votes		5,172	100

=== District 3 ===
2023 Louisiana's 3rd State House district election
Primary election
Party	Candidate	Votes	%
Democratic	Tammy Phelps (incumbent)	Uncontested	100

=== District 4 ===
2023 Louisiana's 4th State House district election
Primary election
Party	Candidate	Votes	%
Democratic	Joy Walters	2,377	34.04
Democratic	Jasmine Green	2,318	33.19
Democratic	Lyndon Johnson	2,288	32.77
Total votes		6,983	100
Democratic	Joy Walters	3,974	53.94
Democratic	Jasmine Green	3,407	46.16
Total votes		7,381	100

=== District 5 ===
2023 Louisiana's 5th State House district election
Primary election
Party	Candidate	Votes	%
Republican	Dennis Bamburg Jr.	Uncontested	100

=== District 6 ===
2023 Louisiana's 6th State House district election
Primary election
Party	Candidate	Votes	%
Republican	Michael Melerine	7,174	68.08
Democratic	Robert Darrow	2,968	28.17
Unaffiliated	Evan McMichael	395	3.75
Total votes		10,537	100

=== District 7 ===
2023 Louisiana's 7th State House district election
Primary election
Party	Candidate	Votes	%
Republican	Larry Bagley (incumbent)	7,524	61.25
Republican	Tim Pruitt	4,761	38.75
Total votes		12,285	100

=== District 8 ===
2023 Louisiana's 8th State House district election
Primary election
Party	Candidate	Votes	%
Republican	Raymond Crews (incumbent)	Uncontested	100

=== District 9 ===
2023 Louisiana's 9th State House district election
Primary election
Party	Candidate	Votes	%
Republican	Dodie Horton (incumbent)	4,392	60.07
Republican	Chris Turner	2,919	39.93
Total votes		7,311	100

=== District 10 ===
2023 Louisiana's 10th State House district election
Primary election
Party	Candidate	Votes	%
Republican	Wayne McMahen (incumbent)	Uncontested	100

=== District 11 ===
2023 Louisiana's 11th State House district election
Primary election
Party	Candidate	Votes	%
Democratic	Rashid Young	Uncontested	100

=== District 12 ===
2023 Louisiana's 12th State House district election
Primary election
Party	Candidate	Votes	%
Republican	Christopher Turner (incumbent)	Uncontested	100

=== District 13 ===
2023 Louisiana's 13th State House district election
Primary election
Party	Candidate	Votes	%
Republican	Jack McFarland (incumbent)	Uncontested	100

=== District 14 ===
2023 Louisiana's 14th State House district election
Primary election
Party	Candidate	Votes	%
Republican	Michael Echols (incumbent)	Uncontested	100

=== District 15 ===
2023 Louisiana's 15th State House district election
Primary election
Party	Candidate	Votes	%
Republican	Foy Gadberry (incumbent)	5,340	54.51
Republican	Randall Robinson	4,457	45.49
Total votes		10,680	100

=== District 16 ===
2023 Louisiana's 16th State House district election
Primary election
Party	Candidate	Votes	%
Democratic	Adrian Fisher (incumbent)	Uncontested	100

=== District 17 ===
2023 Louisiana's 17th State House district election
Primary election
Party	Candidate	Votes	%
Democratic	Pat Moore (incumbent)	Uncontested	100

=== District 18 ===
2023 Louisiana's 18th State House district election
Primary election
Party	Candidate	Votes	%
Republican	Jeremy LaCombe (incumbent)	6,354	43.09
Republican	Tammi Fabre	5,602	37.99
Democratic	Shanda Paul	2,791	18.93
Total votes		14,747	100
Republican	Jeremy LaCombe (incumbent)	6,635	55.45
Republican	Tammi Fabre	5,331	44.55
Total votes		11,966	100

=== District 19 ===
2023 Louisiana's 19th State House district election
Primary election
Party	Candidate	Votes	%
Republican	Francis Thompson (incumbent)	8,622	77.93
Independent	Norm Davis	2,442	22.07
Total votes		11,064	100

=== District 20 ===
2023 Louisiana's 20th State House district election
Primary election
Party	Candidate	Votes	%
Republican	Neil Riser (incumbent)	7,732	57.19
Republican	Kevin Bates	5,788	42.81
Total votes		13,520	100

=== District 21 ===
2023 Louisiana's 21st State House district election
Primary election
Party	Candidate	Votes	%
Democratic	C. Travis Johnson	5,279	48.83
Democratic	Jamie Davis Jr.	4,755	43.98
Democratic	Clark White Jr.	777	7.19
Total votes		10,811	100
Democratic	C. Travis Johnson	4,787	52.37
Democratic	Jamie Davis Jr	4,353	47.63
Total votes		9,140	100

=== District 22 ===
2023 Louisiana's 22nd State House district election
Primary election
Party	Candidate	Votes	%
Republican	Gabe Firment (incumbent)	Uncontested	100

=== District 23 ===
2023 Louisiana's 23rd State House district election
Primary election
Party	Candidate	Votes	%
Democratic	Tammy Savoie	2,403	35.61
Democratic	Shaun Mena	1,928	28.57
Democratic	Pearl Ricks	1,430	21.19
Democratic	Bryan Jefferson	988	14.64
Total votes		6,749	100
Democratic	Tammy Savoie	1,820	42.13
Democratic	Shaun Mena	2,500	57.87
Total votes		4,320	100

=== District 24 ===
2023 Louisiana's 24th State House district election
Primary election
Party	Candidate	Votes	%
Republican	Rodney Schamerhorn (incumbent)	5,678	60.24
Republican	Clarence Beebe	3,747	39.76
Total votes		9,425	100

=== District 25 ===
2023 Louisiana's 25th State House district election
Primary election
Party	Candidate	Votes	%
Republican	Jason DeWitt	7,130	59.03
Republican	Trish Leleux	4,948	40.97
Total votes		12,078	100

=== District 26 ===
2023 Louisiana's 26th State House district election
Primary election
Party	Candidate	Votes	%
Democratic	Ed Larvadain III	4,224	61.50
Democratic	Sandra Franklin	1,388	20.21
Democratic	Reddex Washington Jr.	1,256	18.29
Total votes		6,868	100

=== District 27 ===
2023 Louisiana's 27th State House district election
Primary election
Party	Candidate	Votes	%
Republican	Michael T. Johnson (incumbent)	Uncontested	100

=== District 28 ===
2023 Louisiana's 28th State House district election
Primary election
Party	Candidate	Votes	%
Republican	Daryl Deshotel (incumbent)	8,480	81.47
Democratic	Ramondo Ramos	1,929	18.53
Total votes		10,409	100

=== District 29 ===
2023 Louisiana's 29th State House district election
Primary election
Party	Candidate	Votes	%
Democratic	Edmond Jordan (incumbent)	Uncontested	100

=== District 30 ===
2023 Louisiana's 30th State House district election
Primary election
Party	Candidate	Votes	%
Republican	Charles Owen (incumbent)	5,545	85.15
Independent	William Jones	967	14.85
Total votes		6,512	100

=== District 31 ===
2023 Louisiana's 31st State House district election
Primary election
Party	Candidate	Votes	%
Republican	Troy Hebert	6,389	60.75
Republican	Jonathan Goudeau (incumbent)	4,128	39.25
Total votes		10,517	100

=== District 32 ===
2023 Louisiana's 32nd State House district election
Primary election
Party	Candidate	Votes	%
Republican	R. Dewith Carrier (incumbent)	Uncontested	100

=== District 33 ===
2023 Louisiana's 33rd State House district election
Primary election
Party	Candidate	Votes	%
Republican	Les Farnum (incumbent)	Uncontested	100

=== District 34 ===
2023 Louisiana's 34th State House district election
Primary election
Party	Candidate	Votes	%
Democratic	Wilford Carter Sr. (incumbent)	4,599	62.22
Democratic	Kevin Guidry	2,211	29.91
Democratic	Franklin Lewis Sr.	581	7.86
Total votes		7,391	100

=== District 35 ===
2023 Louisiana's 35th State House district election
Primary election
Party	Candidate	Votes	%
Republican	Brett F. Geymann (incumbent)	Uncontested	100

=== District 36 ===
2023 Louisiana's 36th State House district election
Primary election
Party	Candidate	Votes	%
Republican	Phillip Eric Tarver (incumbent)	Uncontested	100

=== District 37 ===
2023 Louisiana's 37th State House district election
Primary election
Party	Candidate	Votes	%
Republican	Troy Romero (incumbent)	Uncontested	100

=== District 38 ===
2023 Louisiana's 38th State House district election
Primary election
Party	Candidate	Votes	%
Republican	Rhonda Butler (incumbent)	Uncontested	100

=== District 39 ===
2023 Louisiana's 39th State House district election
Primary election
Party	Candidate	Votes	%
Republican	Julie Emerson (incumbent)	6,441	71.69
Democratic	Mckinley James Jr.	2,543	28.31
Total votes		8,984	100

=== District 40 ===
2023 Louisiana's 40th State House district election
Primary election
Party	Candidate	Votes	%
Democratic	Dustin Miller (incumbent)	8,853	81.32
Democratic	Allen Guillory	2,034	18.68
Total votes		10,887	100

=== District 41 ===
2023 Louisiana's 41st State House district election
Primary election
Party	Candidate	Votes	%
Republican	Phillip DeVillier (incumbent)	Uncontested	100

=== District 42 ===
2023 Louisiana's 42nd State House district election
Primary election
Party	Candidate	Votes	%
Republican	Chance Henry	6,601	61.85
Republican	Douglas LaCombe	4,071	38.15
Total votes		10,672	100

=== District 43 ===
2023 Louisiana's 43rd State House district election
Primary election
Party	Candidate	Votes	%
Republican	Josh Carlson	9,342	84.07
Democratic	Ludwig Gelobter	1,770	15.93
Total votes		11,112	100

=== District 44 ===
2023 Louisiana's 44th State House district election
Primary election
Party	Candidate	Votes	%
Democratic	Tehmi Chassion	4,098	51.62
Democratic	Pat Lewis	3,104	39.10
Democratic	Ravis Martinez	737	9.28
Total votes		7,939	100

=== District 45 ===
2023 Louisiana's 45th State House district election
Primary election
Party	Candidate	Votes	%
Republican	Brach Myers	7,856	70.07
Democratic	Paul LeBleu	2,859	25.50
Unaffiliated	Jupiter Leblanc	497	4.43
Total votes		11,212	100

=== District 46 ===
2023 Louisiana's 46th State House district election
Primary election
Party	Candidate	Votes	%
Republican	Chad Boyer	Uncontested	100

=== District 47 ===
2023 Louisiana's 47nd State House district election
Primary election
Party	Candidate	Votes	%
Republican	Ryan Bourriaque (incumbent)	Uncontested	100

=== District 48 ===
2023 Louisiana's 48th State House district election
Primary election
Party	Candidate	Votes	%
Republican	Beau Beaullieu (incumbent)	10,681	85.05
Democratic	David Levy	1,877	14.95
Total votes		12,558	100

=== District 49 ===
2023 Louisiana's 49th State House district election
Primary election
Party	Candidate	Votes	%
Republican	Jacob Landry	7,433	63.96
Republican	Sanders Derise	2,331	20.06
Republican	David Eaton	1,857	15.98
Total votes		11,621	100

=== District 50 ===
2023 Louisiana's 50th State House district election
Primary election
Party	Candidate	Votes	%
Republican	Vincent St. Blanc III (incumbent)	7,206	71.96
Democratic	Gloria Robertson	2,808	28.04
Total votes		10,014	100

=== District 51 ===
2023 Louisiana's 51st State House district election
Primary election
Party	Candidate	Votes	%
Republican	Beryl Amedee (incumbent)	Uncontested	100

=== District 52 ===
2023 Louisiana's 52nd State House district election
Primary election
Party	Candidate	Votes	%
Republican	Jerome Zeringue (incumbent)	Uncontested	100

=== District 53 ===
2023 Louisiana's 53rd State House district election
Primary election
Party	Candidate	Votes	%
Republican	Jessica Domangue	3,001	42.80
Republican	Dirk Guidry	2,552	36.40
Republican	Willis Trosclair Jr.	1,458	20.80
Total votes		7,011	100
Republican	Jessica Domangue	3,170	51.60
Republican	Dirk Guidry	2,973	48.40
Total votes		6,143	100

=== District 54 ===
2023 Louisiana's 54th State House district election
Primary election
Party	Candidate	Votes	%
Republican	Joseph Orgeron (incumbent)	Uncontested	100

=== District 55 ===
2023 Louisiana's 55th State House district election
Primary election
Party	Candidate	Votes	%
Republican	Bryan Fontenot (incumbent)	Uncontested	100

=== District 56 ===
2023 Louisiana's 56th State House district election
Primary election
Party	Candidate	Votes	%
Republican	Beth Billings	Uncontested	100

=== District 57 ===
2023 Louisiana's 57th State House district election
Primary election
Party	Candidate	Votes	%
Democratic	Sylvia Taylor	1,722	17.40
Unaffiliated	Russell Wise	1,573	15.90
Republican	Shondrell Perrilloux	1,530	15.46
Democratic	Shane Bailey	1,264	12.77
Democratic	Albert Burl III	1,211	12.24
Democratic	Larry Sorapuru Jr.	990	10.01
Democratic	Rodney Nicholas	864	8.73
Democratic	Michelle Sweeney	741	7.49
Total votes		9,895	100
Democratic	Sylvia Taylor	4,488	65.18
Unaffiliated	Russell Wise	2,398	34.82
Total votes		6,886	100

=== District 58 ===
2023 Louisiana's 58th State House district election
Primary election
Party	Candidate	Votes	%
Democratic	Ken Brass (incumbent)	Uncontested	100

=== District 59 ===
2023 Louisiana's 59th State House district election
Primary election
Party	Candidate	Votes	%
Republican	Tony Bacala (incumbent)	Uncontested	100

=== District 60 ===
2023 Louisiana's 60th State House district election
Primary election
Party	Candidate	Votes	%
Democratic	Chad Brown (incumbent)	Uncontested	100

=== District 61 ===
2023 Louisiana's 61st State House district election
Primary election
Party	Candidate	Votes	%
Democratic	C. Denise Marcelle (incumbent)	Uncontested	100

=== District 62 ===
2023 Louisiana's 62nd State House district election
Primary election
Party	Candidate	Votes	%
Democratic	Roy Daryl Adams (incumbent)	5,522	50.96
Democratic	Dadrius Lanus	3,106	28.66
Democratic	Daniel Banguel	2,209	20.38
Total votes		10,837	100

=== District 63 ===
2023 Louisiana's 63rd State House district election
Primary election
Party	Candidate	Votes	%
Democratic	Barbara Carpenter (incumbent)	3,977	41.06
Democratic	Chauna Banks	3,229	33.33
Republican	Christopher Lemoine	2,481	25.61
Total votes		9,687	100
Democratic	Barbara Carpenter (incumbent)	3,964	64.18
Democratic	Chauna Banks	2,212	35.82
Total votes		6,176	100

=== District 64 ===
2023 Louisiana's 64th State House district election
Primary election
Party	Candidate	Votes	%
Republican	Kellee Hennessy Dickerson	6,004	49.27
Republican	Kellie Alford	3,609	29.62
Republican	Garry "Frog" Talbert	2,573	21.11
Total votes		12,186	100
Republican	Kellee Hennessy Dickerson	4,436	60.27
Republican	Kellie Alford	2,924	39.73
Total votes		7,360	100

=== District 65 ===
2023 Louisiana's 65th State House district election
Primary election
Party	Candidate	Votes	%
Republican	Barry Ivey (incumbent)	3,449	32.13
Republican	Lauren Ventrella	2,976	27.72
Republican	Aaron Moak	1,981	18.45
Republican	Stephen Whitlow	1,535	14.30
Republican	Jamie Pope	795	7.40
Total votes		10,736	100
Republican	Barry Ivey (incumbent)	3,207	43.29
Republican	Lauren Ventrella	4,202	56.71
Total votes		7,409	100

=== District 66 ===
2023 Louisiana's 66th State House district election
Primary election
Party	Candidate	Votes	%
Republican	Emily Chenevert	3,749	32.02
Republican	Richie Edmonds	3,196	27.30
Republican	Hollis Day	2,247	19.19
Republican	Monique Appeaning	1,187	10.14
Republican	Drew Maranto	1,328	11.34
Total votes		11,707	100
Republican	Emily Chenevert	4,849	59.97
Republican	Richie Edmonds	3,237	40.03
Total votes		8,086	100

=== District 67 ===
2023 Louisiana's 67th State House district election
Primary election
Party	Candidate	Votes	%
Democratic	Larry Selders (incumbent)	Uncontested	100

=== District 68 ===
2023 Louisiana's 68th State House district election
Primary election
Party	Candidate	Votes	%
Republican	Dixon McMakin	3,606	31.77
Democratic	Belinda Creel Davis	3,526	31.07
Republican	Laura White Adams	3,493	30.78
Democratic	Robert Grodner Jr.	463	4.08
Unaffiliated	Parry Thomas	261	2.30
Total votes		11,339	100
Republican	Dixon McMakin	4,736	56.64
Democratic	Belinda Creel Davis	3,625	43.36
Total votes		8,361	100

=== District 69 ===
2023 Louisiana's 69th State House district election
Primary election
Party	Candidate	Votes	%
Republican	Paula Davis (incumbent)	Uncontested	100

=== District 70 ===
2023 Louisiana's 70th State House district election
Primary election
Party	Candidate	Votes	%
Republican	Barbara Reich Freiberg (incumbent)	3,971	38.87
Democratic	Steve Myers	2,775	27.16
Republican	Jennie Seals	2,163	21.17
Republican	Brent Campanella	1,307	12.79
Total votes		10,216	100
Republican	Barbara Reich Freiberg (incumbent)	4,485	64.94
Democratic	Steve Myers	2,241	35.06
Total votes		6,726	100

=== District 71 ===
2023 Louisiana's 71st State House district election
Primary election
Party	Candidate	Votes	%
Republican	Roger Wilder III	5,252	56.94
Republican	Jim Norred	2,929	31.75
Republican	Walley Avara	1,043	11.31
Total votes		9,224	100

=== District 72 ===
2023 Louisiana's 72nd State House district election
Primary election
Party	Candidate	Votes	%
Democratic	Robby Carter (incumbent)	6,788	67.55
Democratic	Roderick Matthews	3,261	32.45
Total votes		10,049	100

=== District 73 ===
2023 Louisiana's 73rd State House district election
Primary election
Party	Candidate	Votes	%
Republican	Kim Landry Coates	6,244	53.86
Republican	Braville LeBlanc	4,247	36.64
Republican	Michael Chatellier	1,101	9.50
Total votes		11,592	100

=== District 74 ===
2023 Louisiana's 74th State House district election
Primary election
Party	Candidate	Votes	%
Republican	Peter Egan	5,872	46.82
Republican	Buffie Singletary	3,948	31.48
Republican	Louis Dutel	2,721	21.70
Total votes		12,541	100
Republican	Peter Egan	4,480	54
Republican	Buffie Singletary	3,817	46
Total votes		8,297	100

=== District 75 ===
2023 Louisiana's 75th State House district election
Primary election
Party	Candidate	Votes	%
Republican	John Wyble	5,801	47.53
Democratic	Kelvin May	3,211	26.31
Republican	Jacob Talley	3,193	26.16
Total votes		12,205	100
Republican	John Wyble	8,233	70.22
Democratic	Kelvin May	3,491	29.78
Total votes		11,724	100

=== District 76 ===
2023 Louisiana's 76th State House district election
Primary election
Party	Candidate	Votes	%
Republican	Stephanie Berault	6,674	79.41
Republican	Shawn Jones	1,731	20.59
Total votes		8,405	100

=== District 77 ===
2023 Louisiana's 77th State House district election
Primary election
Party	Candidate	Votes	%
Republican	Mark Wright (incumbent)	Uncontested	100

=== District 78 ===
2023 Louisiana's 78th State House district election
Primary election
Party	Candidate	Votes	%
Republican	John R. Illg Jr. (incumbent)	Uncontested	100

=== District 79 ===
2023 Louisiana's 79th State House district election
Primary election
Party	Candidate	Votes	%
Republican	Debbie Villio (incumbent)	Uncontested	100

=== District 80 ===
2023 Louisiana's 80th State House district election
Primary election
Party	Candidate	Votes	%
Republican	Polly Thomas (incumbent)	Uncontested	100

=== District 81 ===
2023 Louisiana's 81st State House district election
Primary election
Party	Candidate	Votes	%
Republican	Jeff Wiley	6,569	55.46
Republican	Jason Amato	5,276	44.54
Total votes		11,845	100

=== District 82 ===
2023 Louisiana's 82nd State House district election
Primary election
Party	Candidate	Votes	%
Republican	Laurie Schlegel (incumbent)	Uncontested	100

=== District 83 ===
2023 Louisiana's 83rd State House district election
Primary election
Party	Candidate	Votes	%
Democratic	Kyle Green (incumbent)	4,959	70.61
Republican	Reginald Jasmin	2,064	29.39
Total votes		7,023	100

=== District 84 ===
2023 Louisiana's 84th State House district election
Primary election
Party	Candidate	Votes	%
Republican	Timothy P. Kerner Sr (incumbent)	Uncontested	100

=== District 85 ===
2023 Louisiana's 85th State House district election
Primary election
Party	Candidate	Votes	%
Republican	Vincent E. Cox III	4,061	62.00
Democratic	Andrea Manuel	2,080	31.76
Unaffiliated	Andrew Bennett	409	6.24
Total votes		6,550	100

=== District 86 ===
2023 Louisiana's 86th State House district election
Primary election
Party	Candidate	Votes	%
Republican	Nicholas Muscarello (incumbent)	Uncontested	100

=== District 87 ===
2023 Louisiana's 87th State House district election
Primary election
Party	Candidate	Votes	%
Democratic	Rodney Lyons (incumbent)	4,317	70.30
Democratic	Trent Mackey Jr.	1,824	29.70
Total votes		6,141	100

=== District 88 ===
2023 Louisiana's 88th State House district election
Primary election
Party	Candidate	Votes	%
Republican	Kathy Edmonston (incumbent)	5,933	63.80
Republican	Donald Schexnaydre	2,269	24.40
Republican	Willie Robinson	1,098	11.81
Total votes		9,300	100

=== District 89 ===
2023 Louisiana's 89th State House district election
Primary election
Party	Candidate	Votes	%
Republican	Kim Carver	5,547	43.68
Republican	Joshua "Josh" Allison	3,417	26.91
Republican	Scott Nowicki	2,021	15.91
Republican	Hugh Cassidy	1,714	13.50
Total votes		12,699	100
Republican	Kim Carver	4,921	53.88
Republican	Joshua "Josh" Allison	4,213	46.12
Total votes		9,134	100

=== District 90 ===
2023 Louisiana's 90th State House district election
Primary election
Party	Candidate	Votes	%
Republican	Mary DuBuisson (incumbent)	4,309	47.85
Republican	Brian Glorioso	3,925	43.58
Libertarian	Heide Alejandro-Smith	772	8.57
Total votes		9,006	100
Republican	Mary DuBuisson (incumbent)	2,619	43.40
Republican	Brian Glorioso	3,416	56.60
Total votes		6,035	100

=== District 91 ===
2023 Louisiana's 91st State House district election
Primary election
Party	Candidate	Votes	%
Democratic	Mandie Landry (incumbent)	5,342	65.53
Democratic	Madison O'Malley	2,100	25.76
Democratic	Edward Carlson	710	8.71
Total votes		8,152	100

=== District 92 ===
2023 Louisiana's 92nd State House district election
Primary election
Party	Candidate	Votes	%
Republican	Joseph A. Stagni (incumbent)	4,486	69.71
Republican	Michael Sigur	1,949	30.29
Total votes		6,435	100

=== District 93 ===
2023 Louisiana's 93rd State House district election
Primary election
Party	Candidate	Votes	%
Democratic	Alonzo Knox (incumbent)	Uncontested	100

=== District 94 ===
2023 Louisiana's 94th State House district election
Primary election
Party	Candidate	Votes	%
Republican	Stephanie Hilferty (incumbent)	9,157	87.50
Republican	Charles Marsala	1,308	12.50
Total votes		10,465	100

=== District 95 ===
2023 Louisiana's 95th State House district election
Primary election
Party	Candidate	Votes	%
Republican	Shane Mack	5,798	59.50
Republican	Aaron Ellis	3,946	40.50
Total votes		9,744	100

=== District 96 ===
2023 Louisiana's 96th State House district election
Primary election
Party	Candidate	Votes	%
Democratic	Marcus Bryant (incumbent)	Uncontested	100

=== District 97 ===
2023 Louisiana's 97th State House district election
Primary election
Party	Candidate	Votes	%
Democratic	Matthew Willard (incumbent)	Uncontested	100

=== District 98 ===
2023 Louisiana's 98th State House district election
Primary election
Party	Candidate	Votes	%
Democratic	Aimee Adatto Freeman (incumbent)	Uncontested	100
Total votes			

=== District 99 ===
2023 Louisiana's 99th State House district election
Primary election
Party	Candidate	Votes	%
Democratic	Candace Newell (incumbent)	Uncontested	100

=== District 100 ===
2023 Louisiana's 100th State House district election
Primary election
Party	Candidate	Votes	%
Democratic	Jason Hughes (incumbent)	Uncontested	100

=== District 101 ===
2023 Louisiana's 101st State House district election
Primary election
Party	Candidate	Votes	%
Democratic	Vanessa Caston LaFleur (incumbent)	Uncontested	100

=== District 102 ===
2023 Louisiana's 102nd State House district election
Primary election
Party	Candidate	Votes	%
Democratic	Delisha Boyd (incumbent)	Uncontested	100

=== District 103 ===
2023 Louisiana's 103rd State House district election
Primary election
Party	Candidate	Votes	%
Republican	"Mike" Bayham	4,713	46.63
Republican	Richard Lewis	3,203	31.69
Democratic	Stacy Riley Sr.	2,192	21.69
Total votes		10,108	100
Republican	"Mike" Bayham	5,834	61.62
Republican	Richard Lewis	3,634	31.38
Total votes		9,468	100

=== District 104 ===
2023 Louisiana's 104th State House district election
Primary election
Party	Candidate	Votes	%
Republican	Jay Gallé	6,260	64.35
Republican	John Raymond	3,468	35.65
Total votes		9,728	100

=== District 105 ===
2023 Louisiana's 105th State House district election
Primary election
Party	Candidate	Votes	%
Republican	Jacob Braud	3,686	40.41
Democratic	Mack Cormier (incumbent)	2,611	28.63
Democratic	Joanna Cappiello-Leopold	2,456	26.93
Republican	Donald Vallee	368	4.03
Total votes		9,121	100
Republican	Jacob Braud	3,232	55.79
Democratic	Mack Cormier (incumbent)	2,561	44.21
Total votes		5,793	100

== See also ==
- 2023 United States state legislative elections
- 2023 Louisiana State Senate election
