= 2027 United States state legislative elections =

- November 2, 2027

8 legislative chambers 4 states
| Party | Democratic | Republican | Coalition |
| Current chambers | 51 | 35 | 2 (Note: A coalition of 14 Democrats, 5 Independents, and 2 Republicans controls the Alaska House of Representatives. A coalition of 9 Democrats and 5 Republicans controls the Alaska Senate.) |
| Chambers up | 4 | 4 | 0 |
- Map of lower house elections: Democratic-controlled chamber up Republican-controlled chamber up Special elections to be held

- Map of upper house elections: Democratic-controlled chamber up Republican-controlled chamber up Special elections to be held

The 2027 United States state legislative elections will be held on November 2, 2027, for eight state legislative chambers in four states. These off-year elections will coincide with other state and local elections, including gubernatorial elections in three states. Special elections will occur throughout the year in several states.

== Summary table ==
Regularly scheduled elections are to be held in 8 of the 99 state legislative chambers in the United States. Nationwide, regularly scheduled elections are to be held for 578 of the 7,383 legislative seats. This table only covers regularly scheduled elections; additional special elections will take place concurrently with these regularly scheduled elections.

| State | Upper House | | | | Lower house | | | |
| State | Seats up | Total | % up | Term | Seats up | Total | % up | Term |
|---|---|---|---|---|---|---|---|---|
| Louisiana | 39 | 39 | 100 | 4 | 105 | 105 | 100 | 4 |
| Mississippi | 52 | 52 | 100 | 4 | 122 | 122 | 100 | 4 |
| New Jersey | 40 | 40 | 100 | 4 (Note: The upper houses of Arkansas, Delaware, Florida, Hawaii, Illinois, Minnesota, New Jersey, and Texas use a 2-4-4 term length system.) | 80 | 80 | 100 | 2 |
| Virginia | 40 | 40 | 100 | 4 | 100 | 100 | 100 | 2 |

== State summaries ==
=== Louisiana ===
All of the seats of the Louisiana State Legislature are up for election. Both chambers have been controlled by the Republican Party since 2012.

=== Mississippi ===
All of the seats of the Mississippi Legislature are up for election. Both chambers have been controlled by the Republican Party since 2012.

=== New Jersey ===
All of the seats of the New Jersey Legislature are up for election. In 2027, senators will be elected to four-year terms in single-member districts, while Assembly members will be elected to two-year terms in two-member districts. Both chambers have been controlled by the Democratic Party since 2002.

=== Virginia ===
All of the seats of the Virginia General Assembly are up for election. Senators will be elected to four-year terms, while delegates serve terms of two years. The Virginia House of Delegates has been controlled by the Democratic Party since 2026, while the Virginia Senate has been controlled by the Democratic Party since 2020.

== Special elections ==
There are currently 12 state legislative special elections and 2 federal district special elections scheduled for 2027. More than half of all states have procedures for special state legislative elections.

=== California ===
| District | | Incumbent | | | This race | |
| Chamber | No. | Representative | Party | First elected | Results | Candidates |
|---|---|---|---|---|---|---|
| Senate | 11 | Scott Wiener | Democratic | 2016 | Incumbent resigning January 3, 2027, to become a U.S. representative. New member to be elected TBD. | ▌Matt Haney (Democratic); ▌Christine Pelosi (Democratic) |

=== Colorado ===
| District | | Incumbent | | | This race | |
| Chamber | No. | Representative | Party | First elected | Results | Candidates |
|---|---|---|---|---|---|---|
| Senate | 26 | Jeff Bridges | Democratic | 2019 (appointed) | Incumbent resigning January 11, 2027, to become the Colorado State Treasurer. New member to be elected November 2, 2027. | TBD |

=== District of Columbia ===
| District | | Incumbent | | | This race | |
| Chamber | No. | Representative | Party | First elected | Results | Candidates |
|---|---|---|---|---|---|---|
| Council | At-large | Robert White | Democratic | 2016 | Incumbent resigned November 2, 2026, to become D.C.'s non-voting delegate to Congress. New member to be elected April 6, 2027. (Note: Jamal Holtz appointed as interim member on November 9, 2026; Holtz will not run in special election.) | TBD |
| Council | 4 | Janeese Lewis George | Democratic | 2020 | Incumbent resigning January 2, 2027, to become the Mayor of the District of Columbia. New member to be elected TBD. | TBD |

=== Florida ===
| District | | Incumbent | | | This race | |
| Chamber | No. | Representative | Party | First elected | Results | Candidates |
|---|---|---|---|---|---|---|
| Senate | 39 | Bryan Avila | Republican | 2022 | Incumbent resigned August 25, 2026, to run for Lieutenant Governor of Florida. New member to be elected April 6, 2026. | ▌David Borrero (Republican); ▌Alex Rizo (Republican) |

=== Iowa ===
| District | | Incumbent | | | This race | |
| Chamber | No. | Representative | Party | First elected | Results | Candidates |
|---|---|---|---|---|---|---|
| Senate | 14 | Sarah Trone Garriott | Democratic | 2020 | Incumbent resigning January 3, 2027, to become a U.S. representative. New member to be elected TBD. | ▌Wendy Marsh (Democratic); ▌Dave Roszak (Republican) |

=== Louisiana ===
| District | | Incumbent | | | This race | |
| Chamber | No. | Representative | Party | First elected | Results | Candidates |
|---|---|---|---|---|---|---|
| House | 77 | Mark Wright | Republican | 2017 (special) | Incumbent resigned September 7, 2026, after being appointed to a position with the Louisiana Department of Transportation and Development. New member to be elected March 13, 2027. | TBD |
| House | 94 | Stephanie Hilferty | Republican | 2015 | Incumbent resigning January 1, 2027, after being elected to the Public Sevice Commission. New member to be elected TBD. | TBD |
| House | 103 | Michael Bayham | Republican | 2023 | Incumbent died November 12, 2026. New member to be elected TBD. | TBD |

=== South Carolina ===
| District | | Incumbent | | | This race | |
| Chamber | No. | Representative | Party | First elected | Results | Candidates |
|---|---|---|---|---|---|---|
| Senate | 10 | Billy Garrett | Republican | 2020 | Incumbent resigning April 6, 2027, due to health concerns. New member to be elected April 6, 2027. | TBD |
| Senate | 31 | Mike Reichenbach | Republican | 2022 (special) | Incumbent resigning January 13, 2027, to become the Lieutenant Governor of South Carolina. New member to be elected April 6, 2027. | ▌John Holt (Republican); ▌Mark Lawhon (Republican); ▌William Schofield (Republican); ▌Richard Skinner (Republican); ▌Hood Temple (Republican) |

=== Tennessee ===
| District | | Incumbent | | | This race | |
| Chamber | No. | Representative | Party | First elected | Results | Candidates |
|---|---|---|---|---|---|---|
| Senate | 31 | Brent Taylor | Republican | 2022 | Incumbent resigning January 3, 2027, to become a U.S. representative. New member to be elected TBD. | ▌Kemp Conrad (Republican); ▌Jerri Green (Democratic) |

=== Texas ===
| District | | Incumbent | | | This race | |
| Chamber | No. | Representative | Party | First elected | Results | Candidates |
|---|---|---|---|---|---|---|
| Senate | 14 | Sarah Eckhardt | Democratic | 2020 (special) | Incumbent resigning January 2, 2027, to become the Texas Comptroller of Public Accounts. New member to be elected TBD. | ▌Katie Naranjo (Democratic); ▌Jocelyn Tau (Democratic); ▌Lauren Peña (Republican) |
| Senate | 16 | Nathan Johnson | Democratic | 2018 | Incumbent resigning January 2, 2027, to become the Texas Attorney General. New member to be elected TBD. | ▌Ana-Maria Ramos (Democratic); ▌John Turner (Democratic) |
