= Louisiana's 75th House of Representatives district =

American legislative district

Louisiana's 75th State House of Representatives district
Representative
John Wyble; R–Franklinton

Louisiana's 75th House of Representatives district is one of 105 Louisiana House of Representatives districts. It is currently represented by Republican John Wyble of Franklinton.

== Geography ==
HD75 includes the entirety of Washington Parish. It also includes the city of Bogalusa and the town of Franklinton.

== Election results ==
Year	Winning candidate	Party	Percent	Opponent	Party	Percent
2011	Harold Ritchie	Democratic	100%			
2015	Malinda White	Democratic	64.5%	Chuck Nassauer	Democratic	35.5%
2019	Malinda White	Democratic	64.3%	Phillipp Bedwell	Republican	35.7%
2023	John Wyble	Republican	70.2%	Kelvin May	Democratic	29.8%
