= Louisiana's 105th House of Representatives district =

American legislative district

Louisiana's 105th State House of Representatives district
Representative
Jacob Braud; R–Mandeville

Louisiana's 105th House of Representatives district is one of 105 Louisiana House of Representatives districts. It is currently held by Republican Jacob Braud.

== Geography ==
HD105 includes major portions of Plaquemines Parish.

== Election results ==
Year	Winning candidate	Party	Percent	Opponent	Party	Percent	Opponent	Party	Percent	Opponent	Party	Percent
1999	Ernest Wooton	Democratic	69.7%	Betty Welsh	Republican	19.7%	Russel Hayden	Democratic	10.7%			
2003	Ernest Wooton	Democratic	62.7%	Mark Magee	Republican	16.9%	Bobby Riggs	Independent	11.4%	Dan Thompson	Independent	9%
2007	Ernest Wooton	Republican	69.4%	Russel Hayden	Democratic	30.6%						
2011	Chris Leopold	Republican	53.4%	Harold Asevedo	Republican	46.6%						
2015	Chris Leopold	Republican	60.2%	Alexis Billiot	Democratic	39.8%						
2019	Mack Cormier	Democratic	54.2%	Chris Leopold	Republican	45.8%						
2023	Jacob Braud	Republican	55.8%	Mack Cormier	Democratic	44.2%						
