= Danny McCormick =

American politician

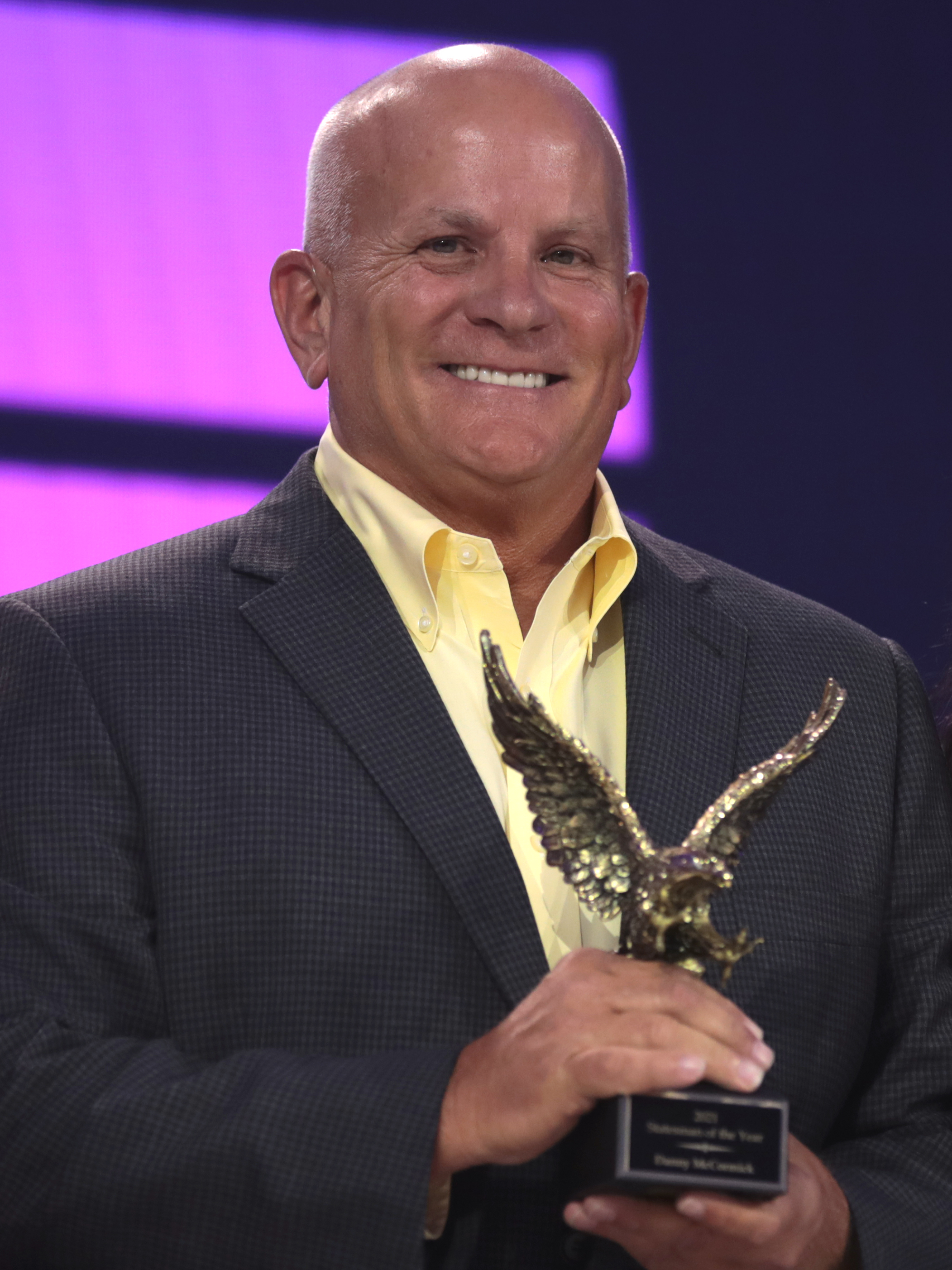

Member of the Louisiana House of Representatives from the 1st district
- Incumbent
- Assumed office January 13, 2020
- Preceded by: James Morris

Personal details
- Born: Shreveport, Louisiana, U.S.
- Party: Republican
- Spouse: Susan
- Children: 2

Danny McCormick is an American politician and businessman serving as a member of the Louisiana House of Representatives from the 1st district. Elected in November 2019, he assumed office on January 13, 2020.

== Early life and education ==
McCormick was born in Shreveport, Louisiana. He graduated from North Caddo High School and attended McNeese State University.

== Career ==
McCormick is the founder of M&M Oil. He was elected to the Louisiana House of Representatives in November 2019 and assumed office on January 13, 2020. In September 2020, McCormick was criticized after posting a meme on Facebook that featured an antisemitic canard conspiracy theory.

McCormick voted for and supports a draft Louisiana state bill that would make in vitro fertilization (IVF) treatments and some forms of birth control a crime, and prosecute women who get abortions for murder. The draft bill has no exceptions for rape, incest, or the protection of the life of the mother.

== Personal life ==
McCormick and his wife, Susan, have two children. He lives in Oil City, Louisiana.

== Election History ==
2023 Louisiana House of Representatives District 1 election
Primary election
Party	Candidate	Votes	%
Republican	Danny McCormick (incumbent)	6,184	66.37
Republican	Randall Liles	3,134	33.63
Total votes		9,318	100

Louisiana House of Representatives
Preceded by James Morris	Member of the Louisiana House of Representatives from the 1st district 2024–present	Incumbent
