= Troy Jude Hebert =

American politician from Louisiana

Member of the Louisiana House of Representatives from the 31st district
- Incumbent
- Assumed office January 8, 2024
- Preceded by: Jonathan Goudeau

Personal details
- Party: Republican
- Education: University of Louisiana at Lafayette

Troy Jude Hebert is an American politician serving as a member of the Louisiana House of Representatives for the 31st district, which covers parts of Lafayette and Vermilion parishes. A Republican, he was elected in the October 14, 2023 primary, defeating incumbent Jonathan Goudeau with 61% of the vote, and took office on January 8, 2024.

Before entering the legislature, Hebert worked as a real estate managing broker. He holds a bachelor's degree in environmental and sustainable resources and an MBA from the University of Louisiana at Lafayette.
