= District 31 =

District 31 may refer to:

== Film and television ==
- District 31 (TV series), a Canadian police drama television series which aired from 2016 to 2022

== Politics ==
In some political systems, electoral districts are numbered rather than named.

=== United States congressional districts ===
Most states in the United States elect fewer than 31 members to the United States House of Representatives, and thus do not have a 31st congressional district. A few of the largest states, however, do elect more than 31 representatives.

- California's 31st congressional district
- New York's 31st congressional district
- Pennsylvania's 31st congressional district
- Texas's 31st congressional district

=== United States state assembly districts ===
Although all states in the United States have more than 31 members in the lower houses of their state legislatures, a few states number their districts differently and thus do not have a 31st assembly district. Note that not all state assembly districts have their own Wikipedia articles at this time.

- California's 31st State Assembly district
- Connecticut's 31st House of Representatives district
- Florida's 31st House of Representatives district
- Idaho's 31st legislative district
- Iowa's 31st House of Representatives district
- Louisiana's 31st House of Representatives district
- Maryland Legislative District 31
- Massachusetts House of Representatives' 31st Middlesex district
- Michigan's 31st House of Representatives district
- New Jersey's 31st legislative district
- New York's 31st State Assembly district
- North Carolina's 31st House district
- Oregon's 31st House district
- Pennsylvania House of Representatives, District 31
- South Dakota's 31st legislative district
- Texas's 31st House of Representatives district
- Virginia's 31st House of Delegates district
- Washington's 31st legislative district
- Wisconsin's 31st Assembly district
- Wyoming's 31st House of Representatives district

=== United States state senate districts ===
Most states in the United States have more than 31 members in their state senates; however, several states have fewer, and some states number their senate districts differently or elect state senators on the same boundaries as the lower house so that the senate district is not a distinct entity from the assembly district. As with state assembly districts, not all state senate districts have their own standalone Wikipedia articles yet.

- Alabama's 31st Senate district
- California's 31st senatorial district
- Colorado's 31st Senate district
- Connecticut's 31st State Senate district
- Iowa's 31st Senate district
- Kansas's 31st Senate district
- Kentucky's 31st Senate district
- Louisiana's 31st State Senate district
- Michigan's 31st Senate district
- Missouri's 31st Senate district
- New York's 31st State Senate district
- North Carolina's 31st Senate district
- Ohio's 31st senatorial district
- Pennsylvania Senate, District 31
- Tennessee's 31st Senate district
- Texas Senate, District 31
- Virginia's 31st Senate district
- Wisconsin's 31st Senate district
- Wyoming's 31st State Senate district
