= Roy Hopkins =

Roy Hopkins may refer to:

- Roy M. Hopkins (1943–2006), member of the Louisiana House of Representatives
- Roy Hopkins (American football) (1945–1996), American football player
