= Louisiana's 103rd House of Representatives district =

American legislative district

Louisiana's 103rd State House of Representatives district
Representative
Michael Robert Bayham, Jr. R–Chalmette

Louisiana's 103rd House of Representatives district is one of 105 Louisiana House of Representatives districts. It is currently held by Republican Micheal Robert "Mike" Bayham Jr.

== Geography ==
HD103 includes the entirety of St. Bernard Parish.

== Election results ==
Year	Winning candidate	Party	Percent	Opponent	Party	Percent
2011	Ray Garofalo	Republican	53.3%	Chad Lauga	Democratic	46.7%
2015	Ray Garofalo	Republican	51.9%	Casey Hunnicutt	Democratic	48.1%
2019	Ray Garofalo	Republican	Cancelled			
2023	Michael Robert Bayham Jr	Republican	61.6%	Richard Lewis	Republican	38.4%
