= Louisiana's 1st House of Representatives district =

American legislative district

Louisiana's 1st State House of Representatives district
Representative
Danny McCormick; R–Oil City

Louisiana's 1st House district is one of 105 Louisiana House of Representatives districts. It is currently represented by Republican Danny McCormick of Oil City.

== Geography ==
HD1 includes the Towns of Vivian, Oil City, Mooringsport, Blanchard, Greenwood and the village of Rodessa.

== Election results ==
Year	Opponent	Party	Percent	Candidate	Party	Percent	Candidate	Party	Percent
2011 (Note: Incumbent ran unopposed)	James Morris	Republican	100%						
2015	James Morris	Republican	79.2%	Mike Boyter	Democratic	20.8%			
2019	Danny McCormick	Republican	51.3%	Randall Liles	Republican	42.0%	James Harper	Republican	6.7%
2023	Danny McCormick	Republican	66.4%	Randall Liles	Republican	33.6%			
