= Souvenirs du château =

Piano solos by Eugénie R. Rocherolle

The Souvenirs du château is a small, five-piece piano solo collection composed by Eugénie R. Rocherolle that embodies the memories shared by her family, friends, and ancestors at the Château de la Rocherolle, a medieval family castle located in the heart of France. The entire work is lovingly dedicated to Guy and Monique Rocherolle.

== The five pieces ==
- Une matinée au lavoir (A Morning at the Laundry Basin) portrays several women scrubbing away, stopping at intervals to engage in light conversation or the gossip of the day.
- La chapelle (The Chapel) is the site of a number of family weddings. It speaks of reverence and romance.
- Déjeuner dans la cour (Luncheon in the Courtyard) captures the conviviality of shared moments around the table.
- Le donjon (The Dungeon) is a dramatic setting of the despondency of all those detained in its darkness.
- Le salon de musique (The Music Room) is a reminiscence of a more elegant time.
