= Louisiana's 50th House of Representatives district =

American legislative district

Louisiana's 50th State House of Representatives district
Representative
Vincent "Vinney" St. Blanc III; R–Franklin

Louisiana's 50th House of Representatives district is one of 105 Louisiana House of Representatives districts. It is currently represented by Republican Vincent "Vinney" St. Blanc III of Franklin.

== Geography ==
HD50 is made up of a small part of Iberia Parish, including the city of Franklin and parts of the cities of Jeanerette and Morgan City.

== Election results ==
Year	Winning candidate	Party	Percent	Opponent	Party	Percent
2011	Sam Jones	Democratic	100%			
2015 -	Sam Jones	Democratic	100%			
2019	Vincent St. Blanc III	Republican	58.1%	Raymond Harris Jr.	Independent	41.9%
2023	Vincent St. Blanc III	Republican	72%	Gloria Robertson	Democratic	28%
