= Ernest Wooton =

American politician (1941–2020)

Member of the Louisiana House of Representatives from the 105th district
- In office January 1999 – January 2012
- Succeeded by: Chris Leopold

Personal details
- Born: October 28, 1941 Place of birth missing
- Died: May 29, 2020 (aged 78) Belle Chase, Louisiana

Ernest Durham Wooton (October 28, 1941 – May 29, 2020) was an American politician. Wooton was a former member of the Louisiana House of Representatives for District 105.

Wooton was born in Plaquemines Parish, Louisiana. He lived with his wife and family in Belle Chasse, Louisiana and went to Port Sulfur High School. Wooton served in the United States Army from 1964 to 1966. He went to Northwestern State University and Louisiana State University. Wooton was involved in the insurance business and in public relations with oilfield sales.

Wooton defeated Jiff Hingle in the 1983 election for Plaquemines Parish sheriff. Wooton held the office for two terms. He was defeated by Hingle in 1991 and 1995. Wooton was elected to the Louisiana House of Representatives in 1999, and served his first terms in the state legislature as a member of the Democratic Party. Wooten switched political affiliations to the Republican Party in 2005. He faced incumbent Republican David Vitter in the 2010 United States Senate elections in Louisiana as an independent candidate, listed as "other" on the ballot. In 2011, Wooton again faced Hingle in an election for Plaquemines Parish sheriff.
