= Louisiana's 77th House of Representatives district =

American legislative district

Louisiana's 77th State House of Representatives district
Representative
Mark Wright; R–Covington

Louisiana's 77th House of Representatives district is one of 105 Louisiana House of Representatives districts. It is currently represented by Republican Mark Wright of Covington. It was formerly represented by later Louisiana State Treasurer, John Schroder.

== Geography ==
HD77 includes a large part of the city of Covington, the town of Madisonville, and the village of Folsom.

== Election results ==
Year	Winning candidate	Party	Percent	Opponent	Party	Percent
2011	John Schroder	Republican	100%			
2015	John Schroder	Republican	100%			
2017 - Special	Mark Wright	Republican	58.1%	Rob Maness	Republican	41.9%
2019	Mark Wright	Republican	80.4%	Beverly Johnson	Democratic	19.6%
2023	Mark Wright	Republican	Cancelled			
