= Louisiana's 31st House of Representatives district =

American legislative district

Louisiana's 31st State House of Representatives district
Representative
Troy Hebert; R–Lafayette

Louisiana's 31st House of Representatives district is one of 105 Louisiana House of Representatives districts. It is currently represented by Republican Troy Hebert of Lafayette.

== Geography ==
HD31 includes a small part of the city of Lafayette, as well as the city of Abbeville.

== Election results ==
Year	Winning candidate	Party	Percent	Opponent	Party	Percent
2011	Nancy Landry	Republican	100%			
2015	Nancy Landry	Republican	84.7%	Evan Wright	Democratic	15.3%
2019	Jonathan Goudeau	Republican	53.9%	Gus Rantz	Republican	46.1%
2023	Troy Hebert	Republican	60.7%	Jonathan Goudeau	Republican	39.3%
