= James Morris (Louisiana politician) =

American politician

Member of the Louisiana House of Representatives from the 1st district
- In office January 2008 – January 2020
- Preceded by: Roy Hopkins
- Succeeded by: Danny McCormick

Personal details
- Born: May 3, 1954 (age 71)
- Party: Independent (since 2018) Republican (until 2018)

James Hollis Morris (born May 3, 1954) is an American politician. He is a former member of the Louisiana House of Representatives for District 1.
