= Louisiana's 94th House of Representatives district =

American legislative district

Louisiana's 94th State House of Representatives district
Representative
Stephanie Hilferty; R–Metairie

Louisiana's 94th House of Representatives district is one of 105 Louisiana House of Representatives districts. It is currently represented by Republican Stephanie Hilferty.

== Geography ==
HD94 is located within the city of New Orleans, and the census-designated place of Metairie.

== Election results ==
Year	Winning candidate	Party	Percent	Opponent	Party	Percent
2011	Nicholas Lorusso	Republican	57.2%	John LaBruzzo, Jr.	Republican	42.8%
2015	Stephanie Hilferty	Republican	56.2%	Nicholas Lorusso	Republican	43.8%
2019	Stephanie Hilferty	Republican	58.7%	Tammy Savoie	Democratic	41.3%
2023	Stephanie Hilferty	Republican	87.5%	Charles Marsala	Republican	12.5%
