= St. Martin's Episcopal School =

Prep school in Metairie, Louisiana, US

Location
- 225 Green Acres Road; Metairie, Louisiana 70003; United States; 29.9773°N 90.1908°W

Information
- Type: Private, Day, College-Prep
- Motto: Faith · Scholarship · Service
- Denomination: Episcopal Church
- Established: 1947
- Oversight: Episcopal Diocese of Louisiana
- Head of School: Whitney Samuel Drennan ’94
- Grades: 8 weeks-12th grade
- Campus size: 18 acres (7.3 ha)
- Campus type: Suburban
- Colors: Red and Navy blue
- Athletics conference: LHSAA
- Team name: Saints
- Athletic Director: Kevin Dizer
- Website: www.stmsaints.com

St. Martin's Episcopal School is a diocesan private college preparatory school in Metairie, Louisiana, United States. It is affiliated with St. Martin's Episcopal Church and the Episcopal Diocese of Louisiana. The school also operates George Cottage, an early childhood program for infants and children up to age 3, after which they may opt to join the main school.

== History ==
St. Martin's Episcopal School was founded in 1947 as a co-educational, independent school. It was the first Episcopal school in the region and operated originally as a parish elementary school on the grounds of its namesake church. It moved to the current campus on Green Acres Road in 1950 to accommodate the growing number of students. A high school was added to meet the demand, and it remains the only Episcopal High School in the region. The early childhood learning program, George Cottage, was opened in 2004. Nearly four thousand students have graduated from St. Martin's since 1951. Ownership of the school was transferred to the Episcopal Diocese of Louisiana during the 1960s.

The school's 18-acre (7.3 ha) campus has 178,700 square feet (16,600 m^{2}) of space under roof. St. Martin's is accredited by the Independent Schools Association of the Southwest, approved by the Louisiana State Department of Education, and holds membership in the Cum Laude Society, the National Association of Independent Schools, the Southwestern Association of Episcopal Schools and the National Association of College Admission Counseling.

Highlights of Recent Accomplishments:

- Two Class of 2025 Graduates are the First to Earn STeaM Diploma Certification
- Member of Class of 2025 Earns National Recognition with the Pfizer Future Physician Award
- Member of Class of 2025 Recognized as Horatio Alger State Scholarship recipient, attending Texas Christian University
- St. Martin’s Named #1 Best Christian High School in the New Orleans Area in 2025
- Renovated, Reimagined George Cottage Threes Classrooms Open Following Devastating Fire
- St. Martin's team was one of thirty-five named nationally as Lemelson-MIT InvenTeam finalists.
- The school opened its Gibbs Family Center for Innovation + Design in early 2017.

== Organization ==
St. Martin's comprises four divisions:

- George Cottage (Early Childhood: 8 weeks - 3 years)
- Lower School (PK–4)
- Middle School (5–8)
- Upper School (9–12)

== Athletics ==
St. Martin's Episcopal School athletics competes in the LHSAA.

== Notable alumni ==
The school's alumni include:

- Barbara Farris, WNBA player
- Leigh "Little Queenie" Harris
- Chris Leopold, former District 105 member of the Louisiana House of Representatives
- Gerald Lewis , former basketball player and coach
- Rhett Lewis , sports reporter
- Bob Livingston, former U.S. Congressman
- Eugénie Ricau Rocherolle
- Kirk Talbot, member of the Louisiana House of Representatives
- Ashley Tappin, Olympic gold medalist swimmer
- Linda Tuero, American tennis player and paleoanthropologist
- Edward Ball, author
- Harlem Berry, LSU running back
