= Rhett Lewis =

American sports reporter (born 1983)

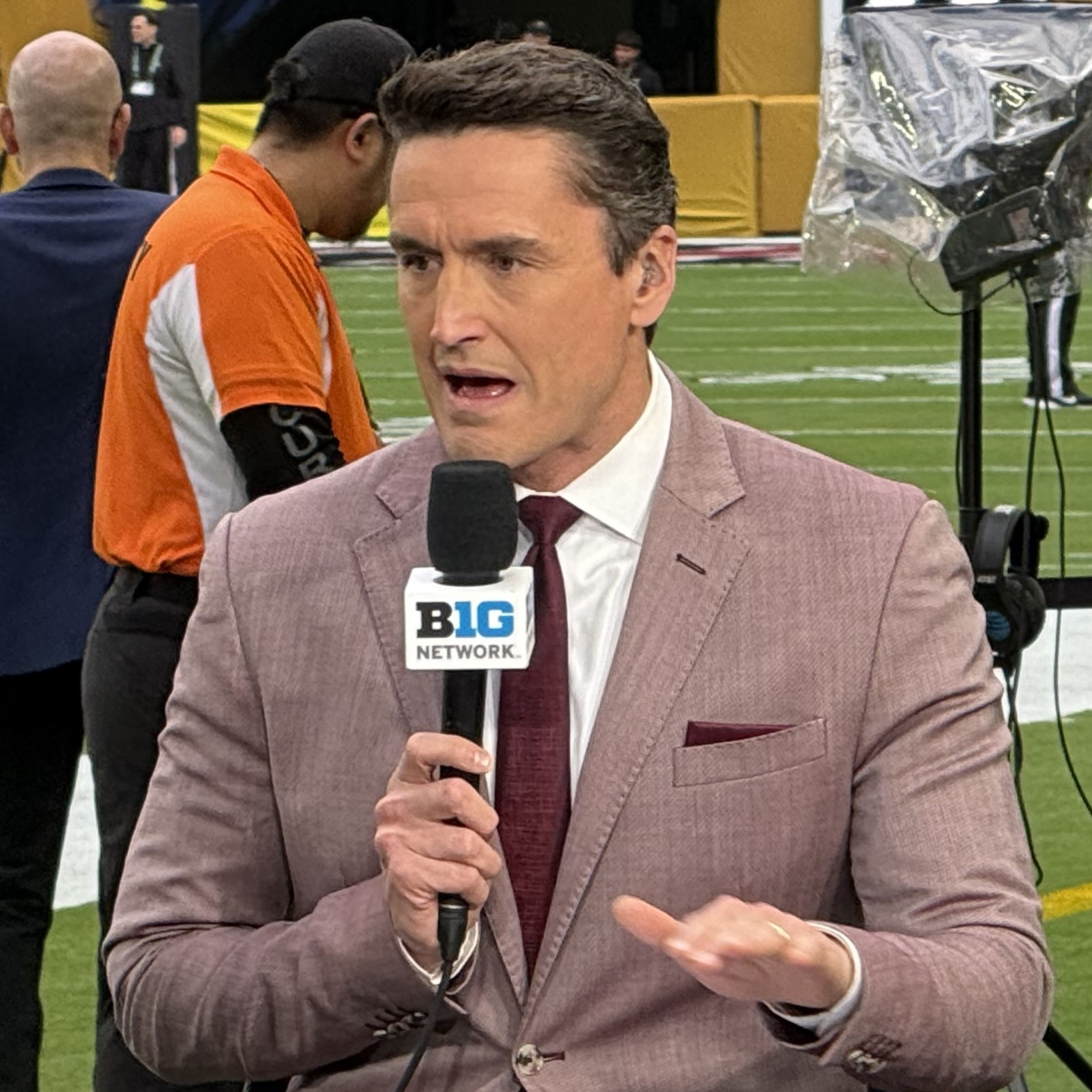
- Lewis in 2026
- Born: Rhett Lewis Kleinschmidt; March 23, 1983 (age 43)
- Occupation: Sports reporter
- Spouse: Kayna Whitworth

Rhett Lewis Kleinschmidt (born March 23, 1983) is an American sports reporter and previously the host of NFL Network's weekday morning show NFL AM.

== Early years ==
Lewis was born and raised in Metairie, Louisiana, the son of Marlene and NFL athletic trainer Dean Kleinschmidt, and attended St. Martin's Episcopal School. He then attended Indiana University, where he played football and majored in sports broadcasting. In his middle school years, he was diagnosed with a severe case of Osgood–Schlatter disease.

== Accomplishments ==
In 2017, Lewis founded The Sam Dozier Champions Cup in honor of former St. Martin's Episcopal School Coach Sam "The Bull" Dozier.

== Career ==
In May 2009, Lewis joined WHDH Boston as a sports reporter after serving as a sports director for KLBK in Texas for two years. In July 2014, he joined NFL Network as a host of "NFL AM."

In May 2022, Lewis was named the new radio analyst for Indiana, replacing the retiring Buck Suhr.
