= Eugénie Rocherolle =

American composer (1936–2025)

- Born: August 24, 1936; New Orleans, Louisiana, U.S.
- Died: March 4, 2025 (aged 88)
- Education: BA in Music
- Alma mater: Tulane University
- Occupations: Composer, piano and composition teacher
- Spouse: Didier Rocherolle
- Children: 4

Eugénie Ricau Rocherolle (August 24, 1936 – March 4, 2025) was an American composer, pianist, lyricist, and teacher who began her composing career with choral and band music.

== Biography ==
Rocherolle was born and raised in New Orleans. She graduated from St. Martin's Episcopal School and graduated with a BA in music from the Newcomb College of Tulane University. She spent her Junior Year of college in Paris where she also had a class with Nadia Boulanger. She released her first piano solo collection in 1978 with great success and soon established herself as one of the leading American composers of piano repertoire. Throughout her lifetime she has composed works for solo voice, chorus, and orchestra, musical theater, as well as chamber music for a variety of instruments.

Rocherolle was one of seven composer members of the National League of American Pen Women whose works were chosen to be presented in concert at the Terrace Theater in the John F. Kennedy Center for the Performing Arts. Awards from the Pen Women include first place for both piano and choral in biennial national competitions. She was a member of the American Society of Composers, Authors and Publishers, (ASCAP), Connecticut Composers Inc., and the National Federation of Music Clubs and Music Teachers National Association (MTNA).

Rocherolle's various pieces and arrangements for piano have been performed by Julie Rivers and released on independent label Aureus Recordings: Spinning Gold (1996), Tidings of Joy (1996), Romancing the Piano (1998), and Touch of Blue (2008).

For many years she maintained a private music studio where she taught piano and composition. She and her husband, Didier Rocherolle, whom she met while returning home from her Junior Year in Paris, were long-time residents of Connecticut. They had four children.

Rocherolle died on March 4, 2025, at the age of 88.

== Works ==
The following works are published at Neil A. Kjos Music Company and are succeeded by their edition number:

Piano solo

- A Creative Christmas (GP359)
- American Sampler (GP322)
- Bayou Reflections (GP338)
- Blockbuster (GP346)
- Boogie Bonanaza (GP373)
- Christmas Anew (GP367)
- Christmas Around the Piano (GP337)
- Christmas Joy (GP404)
- Classical Theme and Variations (GP370)
- Cuatro Rumores Hispanicos (GP418)
- Discoveries (GP361)
- Extravaganza (GP364)
- Frisky Business (GP377)
- Hands Separately (GP358)
- Instrumental Inspirations (GP339)
- Just For Friends (GP365)
- Keepsakes (GP355)
- Miniatures (GP327)
- New Orleans Remembered (GP353)
- Pages From A Scrapbook (GP344)
- Parisian Promenade (WP391)
- Past Times (GP368)
- Rainbow's End, Level 2 (GP416)
- Rainbow's End, Level 3 (GP417)
- Romancing in Style, Music of the 21st Century, Level 7 (GP419)
- Seven Scenes (GP335)
- Shall We Gather (GP400)
- Simple Pleasures (GP348)
- Six Moods For Piano (WP36)
- Sonata No. 2 (GP363)
- Sonatina in C (GP351)
- Souvenirs du château (GP369)
  - including Une matinée au lavoir, La chapelle, Déjeuner dans la cour, Le donjon, and Le salon de musique
- Vintage Favorites (GP350)
- Westwinds (GP372)

Piano duet

- Christmas Side By Side for one piano, four hands (GP345)
- Headin' South... for one piano, four hands (GP326)
- Let's Duet, Level 4 for one piano, four hands (GP403)
- Rapsodie des Pyrénées for two pianos (GP375)
- Twice Blessed for one piano, four hands (GP362)
- Waltz for two pianos (GP349)

Piano trios (Violin, Cello and Piano)

- A Tableau of Piano Trios (GP374)
- A Christmas Tableau of Piano Trios (GP376)
- Century Music Piano Trio No.3 (GP438)
