= Chris Leopold =

American politician

Member of the Louisiana House of Representatives from the 105th district
- In office January 9, 2012 – January 13, 2020
- Preceded by: Ernest Wooton
- Succeeded by: Mack Cormier

Personal details
- Born: April 22, 1968 (age 58) Place of birth missing
- Party: Republican
- Education: St. Martin's Episcopal School; Southeastern Louisiana University
- Occupation: Businessman

Christopher J. Leopold (born April 22, 1968) is a businessman from Belle Chasse, Louisiana, who is a former Republican member of the Louisiana House of Representatives for District 105, primarily Plaquemines Parish. His district was numerically the last of the state House districts.

== Background ==
A native of southeastern Louisiana, Leopold graduated in 1986 from St. Martin's Episcopal School in Metairie in Jefferson Parish. In 1990, he earned a Bachelor of Science in marketing from Southeastern Louisiana University in Hammond. He later attended the Institute of Politics at Loyola University New Orleans. Since 1989, he has been self-employed in commercial real estate development. He also operates an off-shore linen service and engages in specialty advertising sales.

Leopold is a member of the Chamber of Commerce, United Way of America, YMCA, Ducks Unlimited, Rotary International, and the Roman Catholic men's organization, the Knights of Columbus. He and his wife, the former Joanna Cappiello, have three children.

== Political career ==
Leopold was elected in 1996, 2000, and 2004 to the Republican State Central Committee. In 2011, he was elected to the state House to fill the seat vacated by the term-limited Ernest Wooton, an Independent and a former St. Bernard Parish sheriff. In the general election held on November 19, Leopold defeated fellow Republican, Harold L. "Rocky" Asevedo, a licensed professional counselor and family therapist from Belle Chasse. Leopold polled 4,786 (53.4 percent) votes to Asevedo's 4,183 (46.6 percent). In addition to Plaquemines Parish, the district includes a few precincts from Orleans and Jefferson parishes.

Leopold opposes both the establishment of pre-kindergarten in Louisiana and privatization of the state employees insurance program. He favors changes in federal reimbursement rules to take into account the lack of population in the coastal wetlands, which have been eroding away in Louisiana for many years and impact the oil, natural gas, and fishing industries. To reduce the state prison population, Leopold supports worker training for inmates and a partnership with industry to provide jobs for prisoners upon their release.

Leopold won reelection to the House in the October 24, 2015, primary election. With 6,841 votes (60.2 percent), he defeated the Democrat, Alexis Catherine Billiot, who polled 4,522 votes (39.8 percent).

In July 2017, Leopold lost a secret ballot, 29 to 26, for the vice chairmanship of the House Republican Caucus. He was defeated by the more conservative Tony Bacala of Ascension Parish. The position became available when John Schroder, a conservative from Covington, resigned from the House to pursue successfully a special election on October 14 for state treasurer.

Leopold lost his reelection bid in the 2019 Louisiana elections to Mack Cormier.

Louisiana House of Representatives
Preceded by Ernest Wooton	Louisiana State Representative for District 105 (Plaquemines Parish); 2012–	Succeeded by Incumbent
