= Jacob Braud =

American politician

Member of the Louisiana House of Representatives from the 105th district
- Incumbent
- Assumed office January 8, 2024
- Preceded by: Mack Cormier

Personal details
- Party: Republican
- Education: Louisiana State University (BA); Loyola University New Orleans College of Law (JD)

Jacob Braud is an American politician serving as a member of the Louisiana House of Representatives from the 105th district. A member of the Republican Party, Braud represents parts of Jefferson Parish, Orleans Parish, and Plaquemines Parish and has been in office since January 8, 2024.
