= Ray Garofalo =

American politician

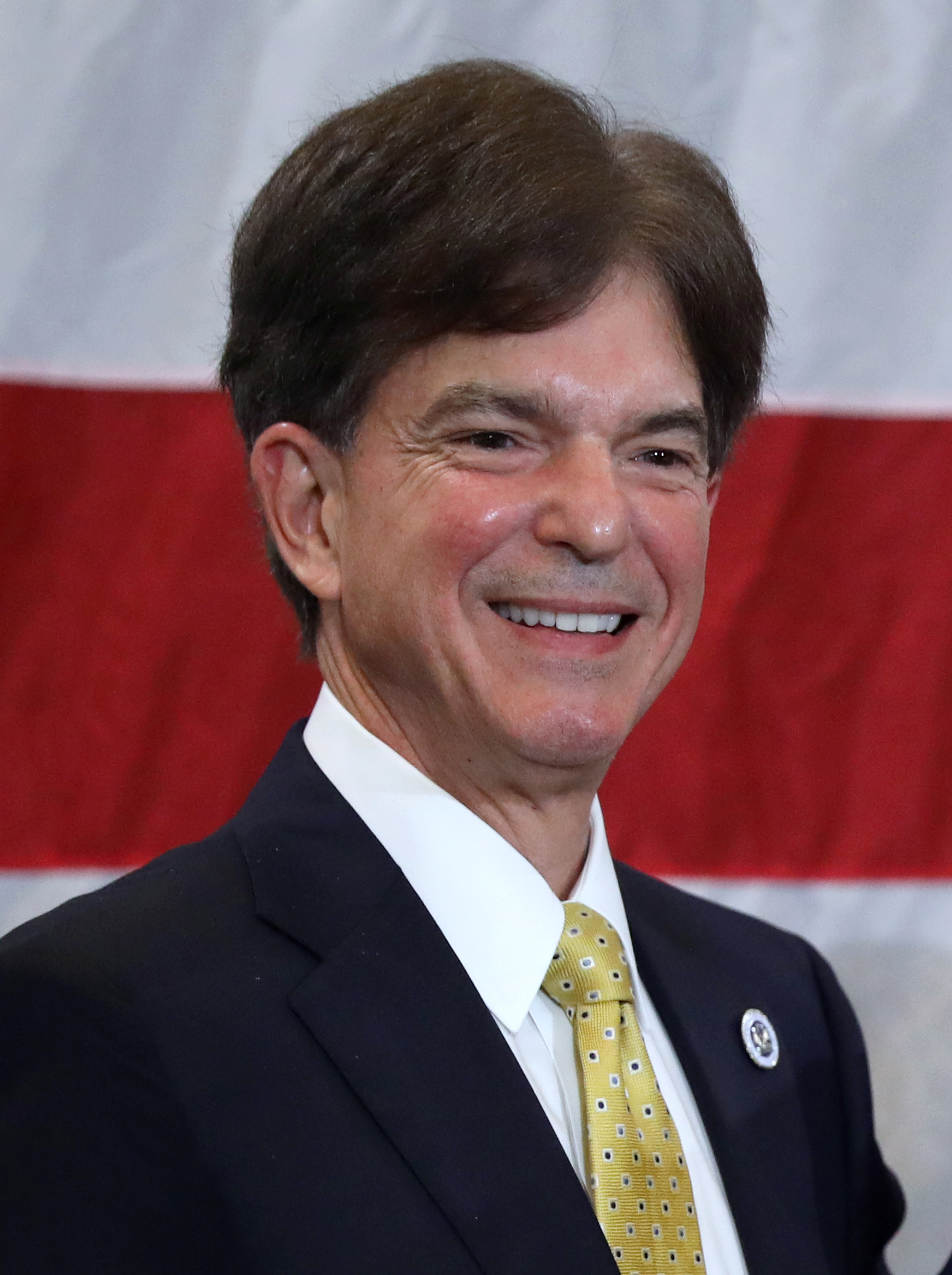
- Garofalo in 2023

Member of the Louisiana House of Representatives from the 103rd district
- In office January 9, 2012 – January 8, 2024
- Preceded by: Reed S. Henderson
- Succeeded by: Michael Bayham

Personal details
- Born: September 1958 (age 68)
- Party: Republican
- Spouse: Joan Seibert Garofalo
- Education: Loyola University New Orleans; Loyola University New Orleans College of Law
- Occupation: Commercial Developer, Attorney

Raymond Edward Garofalo Jr. (born September 1958) is a commercial developer and non-practicing attorney from Meraux, St. Bernard Parish in suburban New Orleans, Louisiana, who is a Republican, and a former member of the Louisiana House of Representatives from District 103, which encompassed primarily St. Bernard Parish and four precincts each from Orleans and Plaquemines parishes.

== Background ==
Garofalo's parents are Raymond Sr. and Jean Garofalo; paternal grandparents, Anthony and Mary Maggio Garofalo. His father was a career officer in the United States Navy. He graduated from the Roman Catholic Holy Cross High School, Loyola University New Orleans and Loyola University New Orleans College of Law. Garofalo resides with his wife, the former Joan Seibert, in Meraux.

== House tenure ==
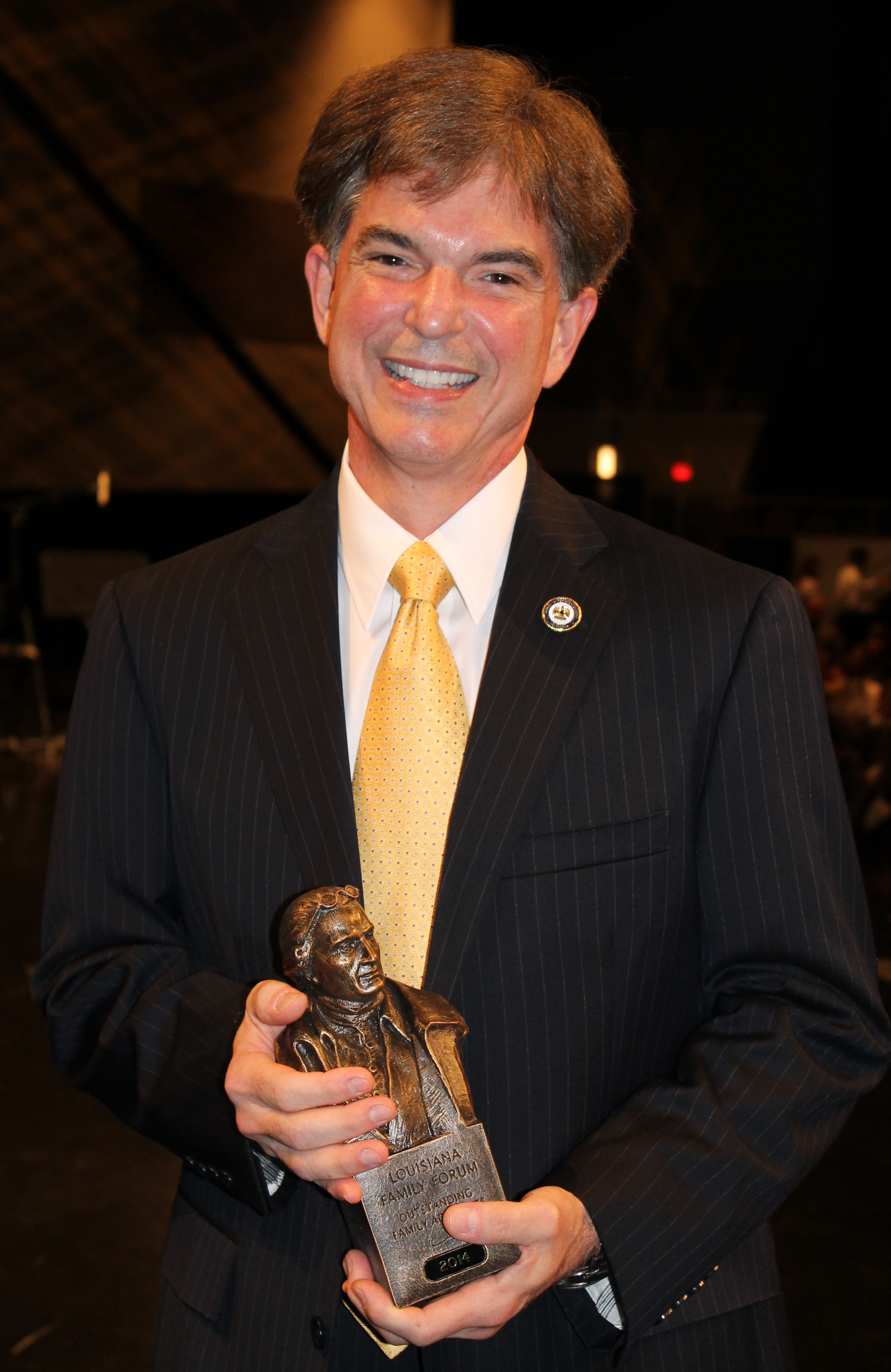
Garofalo receiving the Louisiana Family Forum Outstanding Family Advocate Award

Garofalo won the state House position in the general election held on November 19, 2011, when he defeated Democrat Chad Lauga, 7,153 (53.3 percent) to 6,262 (46.7 percent). The incumbent Democrat Reed S. Henderson did not seek reelection.

In his first term Garofalo was assigned to the House (1) Civil Law and Procedure, (2) Judiciary, and (3) Natural Resources and Environment committees.

In his second term, Garofalo was appointed Chairman of the House Committee on Civil Law and Procedure. Garofalo also served on the Louisiana Law Institute Council (LSLIC), Coastal Protection and Restoration Authority (CPRA) Financing Corporation, the Governor's Coastal Advisory Commission, the Louisiana International Gulf Transfer Terminal (LIGTT) Board, and the Southern States Energy Board (SSEB).

== 2015 reelection ==
Garofalo subsequently won the general election over Hunnicutt, 6,562 (51.9 percent) to 6,079 (48.1 percent).

In 2016, Garofalo publicly supported the candidacy of Donald Trump for the U.S. Presidency.

== 2021 Controversy over slavery ==
Promoting a bill he proposed, which would ban the teaching of critical race theory in public school classrooms, Rep. Garofalo said “If you’re having a discussion on whatever the case may be, slavery, then you can talk about everything dealing with slavery, the good, the bad, the ugly”. Garofalo was immediately rebuked by fellow Republican Rep. Stephanie Hilferty, who replied "There's no good to slavery, though." Then, many of the attendees of the meeting laughed. Garofalo Jr. then repeated the phrase "whatever the case may be". Rep. Garofalo then sought to voluntarily defer the legislation for another date, after a substitute motion was filed to involuntarily defer the bill, a rare move that would have removed the bill from consideration during session. The substitute motion ultimately failed on a 7-7 tie vote, and Garofolo voluntarily withdrew the bill following no further objections, leaving the potential for reintroduction in the future open. As the controversy continued, on May 17 Garofalo was removed as chair of House Education Committee by the Speaker of the House, Clay Schexnayder.

Louisiana House of Representatives
Preceded by Reed S. Henderson	Louisiana State Representative for District 103 (primarily St. Bernard Parish); 2012 –	Succeeded by Incumbent
