= Nicholas Lorusso =

American politician

Nicholas Joseph "Nick" Lorusso

Louisiana State Representative for District 94 (Orleans and Jefferson parishes)
- In office April 2007 – January 2016
- Preceded by: Peppi Bruneau
- Succeeded by: Stephanie Hilferty

Personal details
- Born: November 1967 (age 58)
- Party: Republican
- Spouse: Michelle Merritt Lorusso
- Children: 3
- Education: University of New Orleans; Louisiana State University; Joint Forces Staff College
- Occupation: Attorney; United States Army Reserve Officer

Nicholas Joseph Lorusso (born November 1967), is a New Orleans, Louisiana, lawyer and politician who served as a Republican member of the Louisiana House of Representatives.

Initially elected in 2007, Lorusso was re-elected in 2011, but was defeated in the primary in a bid for re-election in 2015.

Louisiana House of Representatives
Preceded by Peppi Bruneau	Louisiana State Representative for District 94 (Orleans and Jefferson parishes); 2007–2016	Succeeded by Stephanie Hilferty
