= Roy M. Hopkins =

American politician (1943–2006)

Roy M. "Hoppy" Hopkins

Louisiana State Representative for District 1 (Caddo Parish)
- In office 1988–2006
- Preceded by: Bruce Newton Lynn, I
- Succeeded by: James Hollis "Jim" Morris

Caddo Parish Commissioner
- In office 1980 (as Caddo Parish Police Juror) – 1988
- Preceded by: Earl Guyton Williamson, Sr. (as Caddo Parish Police Juror)
- Succeeded by: James Whitfield Williamson

President, Caddo Parish Commission
- In office 1984–1987
- Preceded by: New position
- Succeeded by: Tommy Gene Armstrong

Personal details
- Born: June 10, 1943 Murchison, Texas, United States
- Died: November 23, 2006 (aged 63)
- Party: Democratic
- Spouse: Rosemarie "Rose" Duddeck Hopkins
- Children: Todd Andreas Hopkins; Garry Romain Hopkins
- Occupation: Automobile dealer

Military service
- Branch/service: United States Army
- Battles/wars: Cold War

Roy M. Hopkins, known as Hoppy Hopkins (June 10, 1943 – November 23, 2006), was a Democratic member of the Louisiana House of Representatives for the District 1 parishes of Caddo and Bossier. He served from 1988 until his death.

== Political career ==
Hopkins began his political life as an alderman, and later mayor, of Oil City, Louisiana. In 1979, he was elected to the Caddo Parish Police Jury. Hopkins was also the first president of the Caddo Parish Commission, which replaced the Police Jury in December 1984.

Hopkins won his House seat when the incumbent, Republican Bruce Lynn of Gilliam, decided to bow out of the 1987 contest. Hopkins defeated Republican Kenneth "Ken" Frazier, and fellow Democrat Norbert Johnson.

Republican David Hunter tried unsuccessfully to defeat Hopkins in 1991. Democrats Kirby Kelly and Philip Green challenged him, and lost, in 2003.

== Legislation ==
The Shreveport Times described Hopkins as "adept at getting bills passed and maneuvering behind the scenes to kill legislation he opposed." In the Louisiana House, Hopkins supported the LSU Health Sciences Center in Shreveport, Louisiana and the establishment of the Louisiana State Oil and Natural Gas Museum in Oil City. He wrote legislation to benefit local governments by apportionment of riverboat taxes. And he penned a bill to give health insurance to legislators whose tenures preceded term limits. The bill passed, but was vetoed by Democratic Governor Kathleen Babineaux Blanco.

He was a veteran member of the House Appropriations Committee, elected by the Fourth Congressional District's legislative delegation to serve as its representative.

Colleague and close friend, Representative Billy Montgomery, a Democrat-turned-Republican from Haughton in Bossier Parish, told the Shreveport Times that Hopkins was a "team player" who "led because people liked him so much." Montgomery said that ethics laws were unnecessary for legislators like Hopkins. Then House Speaker Joe Salter, a Democrat from Florien in Sabine Parish, said that Hopkins could not be pressured to support or oppose legislation.

== Personal life ==
Hopkins was born in the village of Murchison in Henderson County, Texas. He was a veteran of the United States Army, having been stationed in Germany during the Cold War. In 1966, Hopkins moved his family to Oil City, Louisiana, and made his living there as an automobile dealer.

Hopkins liked to hunt and golf, and belonged to the Monterey Country Club in Vivian, Louisiana. When the legislature was in session, Hopkins and a group of other House members liked to play nine holes of golf before morning committee meetings.

== Death ==
Hopkins died on November 23, 2006, from bone cancer. Services were held five days later at the United Pentecostal Church of Oil City. Governor Blanco attended the burial in Lakeview Memorial Gardens and met privately afterward with Hopkins' widow, the former Rosemarie "Rose" Duddeck. Hopkins was also survived by sons Todd and Garry.

Hopkins was honored two months before his death by the naming of "Roy 'Hoppy' Hopkins Drive", the entrance to the Caddo Parish Ward II Industrial Park near Vivian.

In a special election held on February 24, 2007, to choose Hopkins' successor, Republican Jim Morris, a Caddo Parish commissioner, received 69 percent of the vote. Morris then won a full term in the nonpartisan blanket primary held on October 20, 2007.

Political offices
Preceded by Bruce Lynn	Louisiana State Representative for District 1 (northern Caddo Parish); 1988–2006	Succeeded by Jim Morris
Preceded by Earl Guyton Williamson, Sr.	Caddo Parish Commissioner; 1980–1988	Succeeded by James Whitfield Williamson
Preceded by New position	President, Caddo Parish Commission; 1984–1987	Succeeded by Tommy Armstrong
