= Nancy Landry =

American politician (born 1962)

Secretary of State of Louisiana
- Incumbent
- Assumed office January 8, 2024
- Governor: Jeff Landry
- Preceded by: Kyle Ardoin

Member of the Louisiana House of Representatives from the 31st district
- In office January 2008 – July 16, 2019
- Preceded by: Donald Trahan
- Succeeded by: Jonathan Goudeau

Personal details
- Born: Nancy Ruth Landry; June 10, 1962 (age 64) Japan
- Party: Independent (before 2008); Republican (2008–present)
- Children: 2
- Education: Louisiana State University (BA, JD)

Nancy Ruth Landry, also known as Nancy L. Matthews (born June 10, 1962), is an American politician who has served as the Secretary of State of Louisiana since January 2024. She previously served as a member of the Louisiana House of Representatives for the 31st district from 2008 to 2019.

== Early life and education ==
Landry was born in Japan while her father was serving in the United States Navy. She earned a Bachelor of Arts degree in psychology from Louisiana State University in 1985 and a Juris Doctor from the Paul M. Hebert Law Center in 1990.

Landry is of no relation to Governor Jeff Landry.

== Career ==
Landry was elected to the Louisiana House of Representatives in November 2007 and assumed office in January 2008.

On May 19, 2015, Landry, a former independent, was one of four Republicans on the House Civil Law and Procedure Committee who voted to table on a 10–2 vote the proposed Marriage and Conscience Act, authored by Republican Representative Mike Johnson of Bossier Parish.

Considered a moderate Republican, Landry was the chair of the House Education Committee in 2017. In that capacity, she supported legislation by State Representative Barbara Norton of Shreveport to ban corporal punishment in all Louisiana public schools, but the measure was defeated by a vote of 61–34.

Landry won reelection in the nonpartisan blanket primary held on October 24, 2015. She received 10,005 votes (84.7 percent) to Democrat Evan H. Wright's 1,890 ballots (15.3 percent).

Landry resigned from the House seven months prior to the expiration of her third term to become the chief of staff in the office of Secretary of State Kyle Ardoin. She was succeeded by Jonathan Goudeau.

She was elected as Louisiana Secretary of State in the November 18, 2023 election.

Party political offices
Preceded by Kyle Ardoin	Republican nominee for Secretary of State of Louisiana; 2023	Most recent
Political offices
Preceded by Kyle Ardoin	Secretary of State of Louisiana; 2024–present	Incumbent
