= Vincent St. Blanc III =

American politician

Member of the Louisiana House of Representatives
- Incumbent
- Assumed office January 13, 2020
- Preceded by: Sam Jones
- Constituency: District 50

Personal details
- Party: Republican

Vincent "Vinney" St. Blanc III is an American politician from the Republican Party of Louisiana. He represents District 50 in the Louisiana House of Representatives, which covers St. Mary Parish and St. Martin Parish.
