= Harold Ritchie =

American politician (born 1949)

Member of the Louisiana House of Representatives from the 75th district
- In office January 12, 2004 – January 2016
- Preceded by: Ben Nevers
- Succeeded by: Malinda Brumfield White

Personal details
- Born: May 24, 1949 (age 77) Bogalusa, Louisiana, US
- Spouse: Patsy Ritchie
- Education: Commonwealth College of Science
- Profession: Funeral director

Harold L. Ritchie (born May 24, 1949) is an American Democratic politician, who served as a member of the Louisiana House of Representatives for District 75 from 2004 to 2016. He was term-limited and ineligible to seek a fourth term in the nonpartisan blanket primary held on October 24, 2015.

Ritchie is a funeral director in Bogalusa in Washington Parish in southeastern Louisiana. He graduated in 1967 from Bogalusa High School and attended Louisiana Tech University in Ruston and Mississippi College in Clinton, Mississippi. He graduated in 1971 from Commonwealth College of Science (now called Commonwealth College of Funeral Service).

Ritchie served on the following House committees: (1) Insurance, (2) Ways and Means, (3) Enrollment, and Joint Capital Outlay.

Louisiana House of Representatives
Preceded by Ben Nevers	Louisiana State Representative for District 75 (St. Tammany and Washington parishes) Harold L. Ritchie; 2004 – 2016	Succeeded by Malinda Brumfield White
