= Malinda White =

American politician

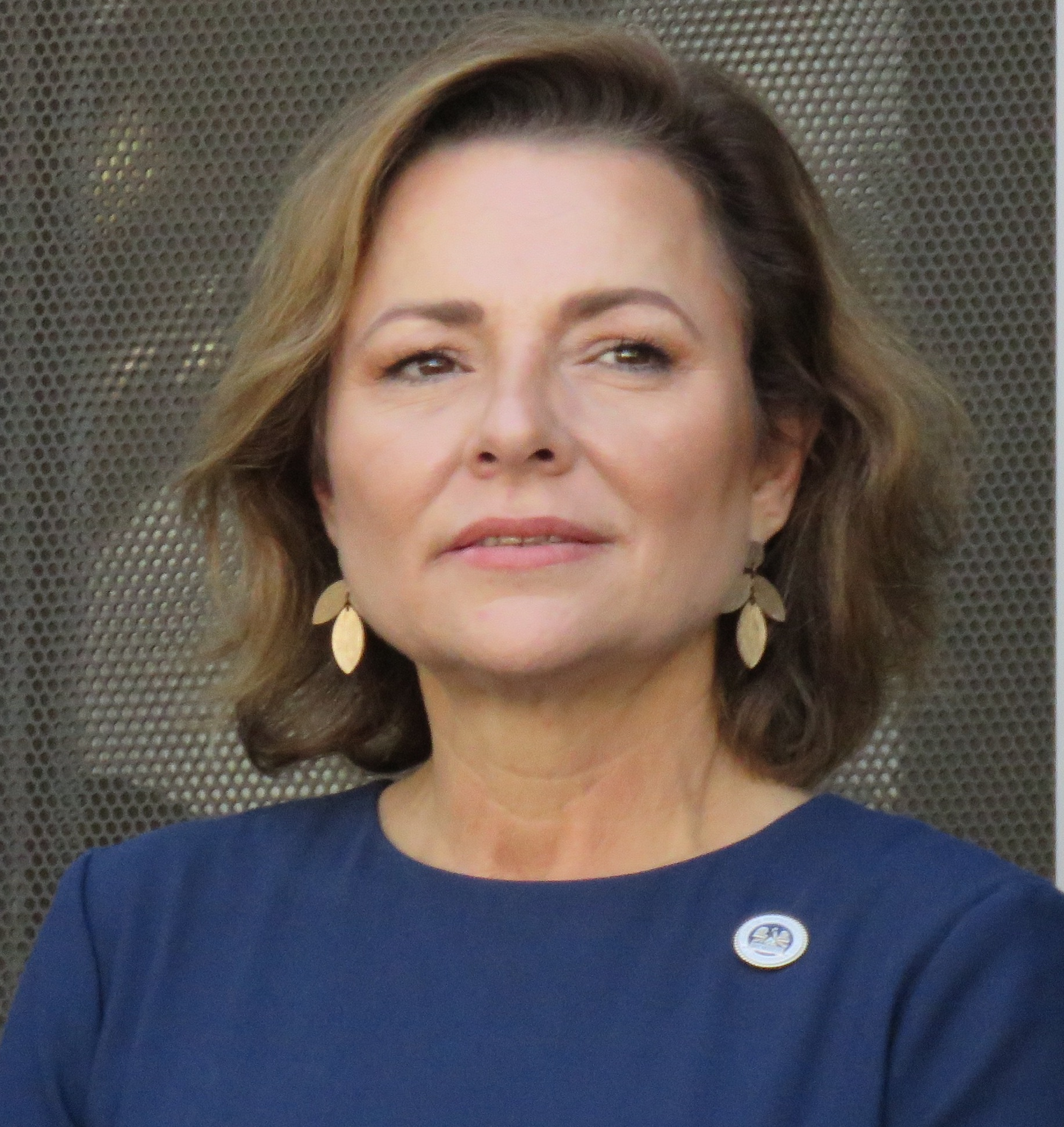

Member of the Louisiana House of Representatives from the 75th district
- In office January 11, 2016 – January 8, 2024
- Preceded by: Harold Ritchie
- Succeeded by: John Wyble

Personal details
- Born: April 1967 (age 59)
- Party: Republican (2022–present)
- Other political affiliations: Independent (2021–2022); Democratic (until 2021)
- Education: Southeastern Louisiana University
- Occupation: Businesswoman; Real estate agent

Malinda Grace Brumfield White (born April 1967) is an American businesswoman and a former Republican member of the Louisiana House of Representatives. She previously ran as an independent and as a Democrat.

== Political career ==
In the primary election held on October 24, 2015, White defeated fellow Democrat Chuck Nassauer, receiving 5,906 votes (54.8 percent) to Nassauer's 4,868 (45.2 percent), thereby securing the seat vacated by Harold Ritchie.

On June 9, 2021, State Representative Alan Seabaugh of Shreveport accused White of threatening to shoot him during a dispute over a domestic-abuse bill under consideration. White later apologized, stating that she "made comments to him in the heat of the moment that she should not have". White withdrew the bill the next day.

== Party affiliation ==
On July 1, 2021, White left the Democratic Party and switched her registration to "no party." On June 14, 2022, she switched her party affiliation again, this time to Republican.

== Civic involvement ==
White has been actively involved in her community. In 2002, she became a certified facilitator of the Achieve Global Leadership Curriculum. She is a former member of the Bogalusa City Council and is the founder and chairwoman of the Bogalusa Blues and Heritage Festival. Additionally, White is a founding member of the Bogalusa Gospel Music Festival. Her civic engagements include membership in several organizations such as the Youth Service Bureau of Washington & St. Tammany Parish, Court Appointed Special Advocate, Washington Parish Poole's Bluff Nature Trail Advisory Council, the Bogalusa Parks, Recreational, and Culture Commission, the Bogalusa Civic League, the Washington Parish Fair Board, Cassidy Park Museums Board, Washington Parish Commission on Human Services, and Washington Parish Economic Development Foundation.

== 2023 Election ==
White ran for Washington Parish President in 2023. In the October 14, 2023 election, White placed second, advancing to the November runoff election, where she was defeated by Ryan Seal.

Louisiana House of Representatives
Preceded by Harold Ritchie	Louisiana State Representative for District 75 (St. Tammany and Washington parishes); 2016–2024	Succeeded by John Wyble
