= Mack Cormier =

American politician

Mack Cormier is an American politician from Louisiana. A Democrat, he has served as a member of the Louisiana House of Representatives from 2020 to 2024.

His father, Amos Cormier Jr., and brother, Amos Cormier III, have served as president of Plaquemines Parish.

== Political career ==
Cormier ran for District 105 in the Louisiana State House in 2019. With 7,177 votes (54.2 percent), he defeated the incumbent Republican, Chris Leopold, who polled 6,075 votes (45.8 percent).

In 2021, Cormier ran for the special election in Louisiana's 7th State Senate district. He placed fourth in the election with 601 votes (8.8 percent).

In 2023, Cormier lost re-election with 2,561 votes (44.2 percent) to Republican, Jacob Braud's 3,232 votes (55.8 percent).
