= Oil City, Louisiana =

Town in the United States

- Town
- Town of Oil City
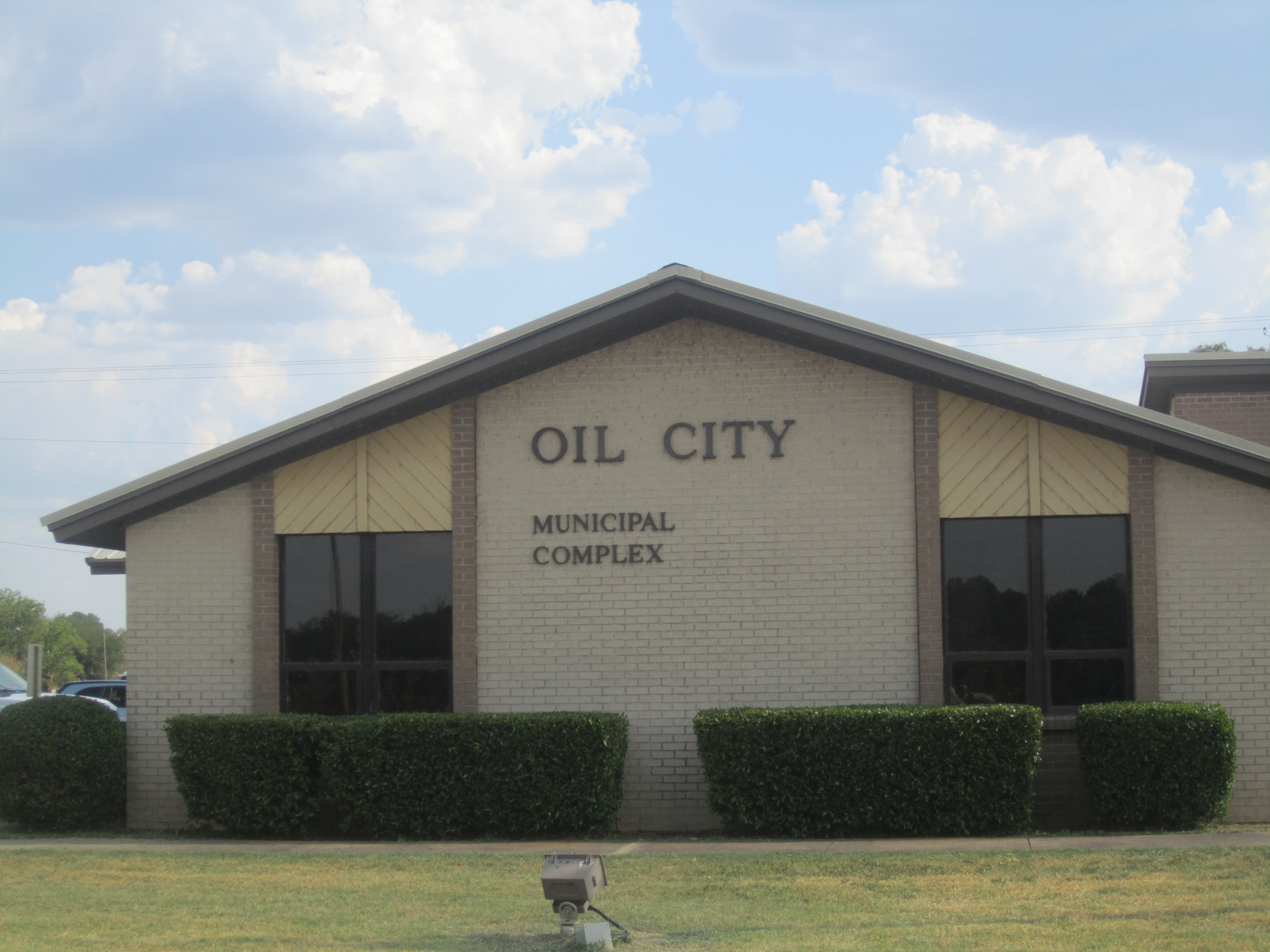
- Oil City Municipal Complex

- Location of Oil City in Caddo Parish, Louisiana.

- Location of Louisiana in the United States
- Coordinates: 32°45′04″N 93°58′34″W
- Country: United States
- State: Louisiana
- Parish: Caddo

Area
  - Total: 1.86 sq mi (4.81 km^{2})
  - Land: 1.78 sq mi (4.62 km^{2})
  - Water: 0.073 sq mi (0.19 km^{2})
- Elevation: 203 ft (62 m)

Population (2020)
  - Total: 901
  - Rank: CD: 5th
  - Density: 505/sq mi (195.1/km^{2})
- Time zone: UTC-6 (CST)
  - Summer (DST): UTC-5 (CDT)
- Area code: 318
- FIPS code: 22-57590
- GNIS feature ID: 2407038
- Website: www.townofoilcity.com

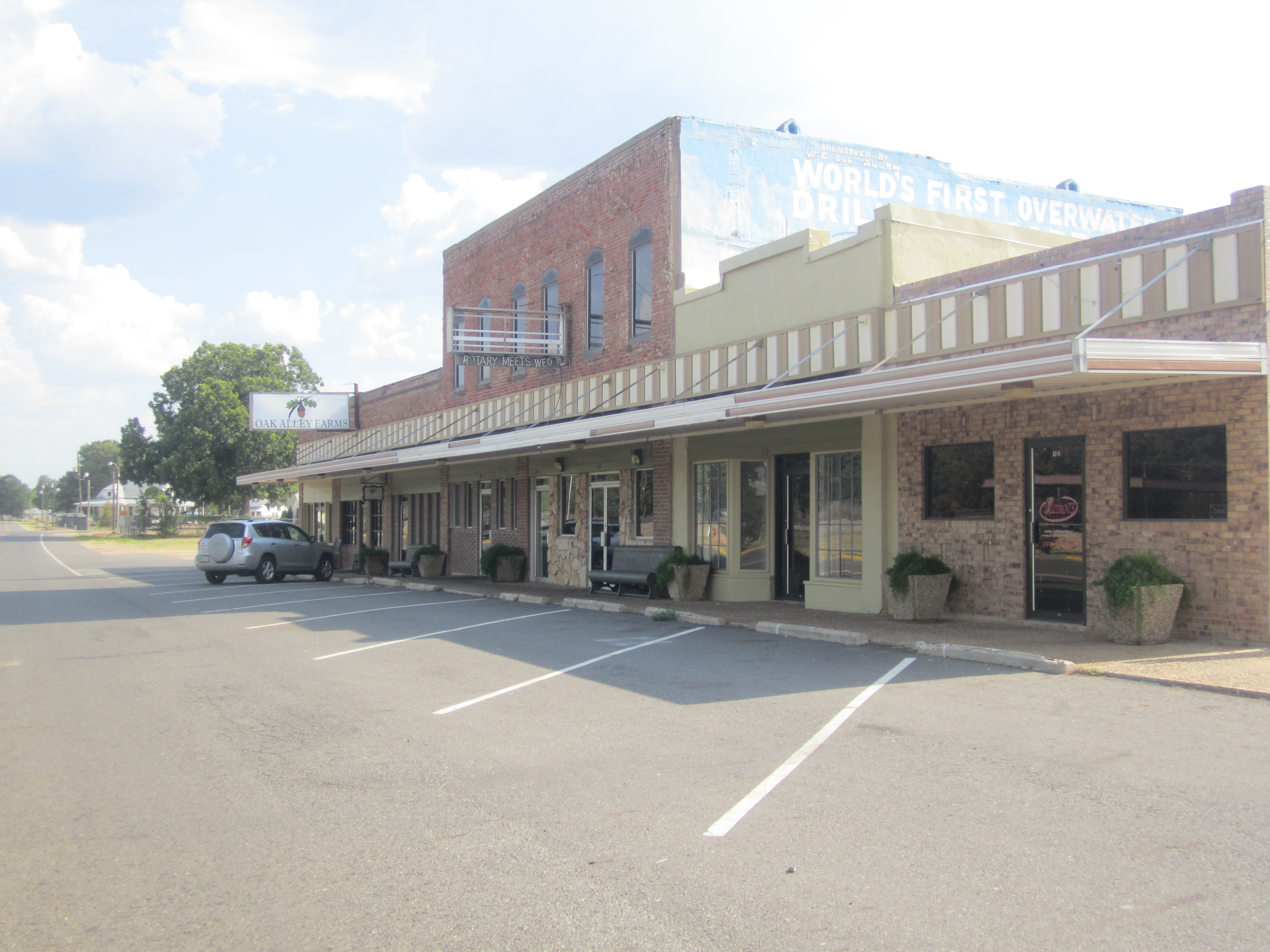
Downtown Oil City

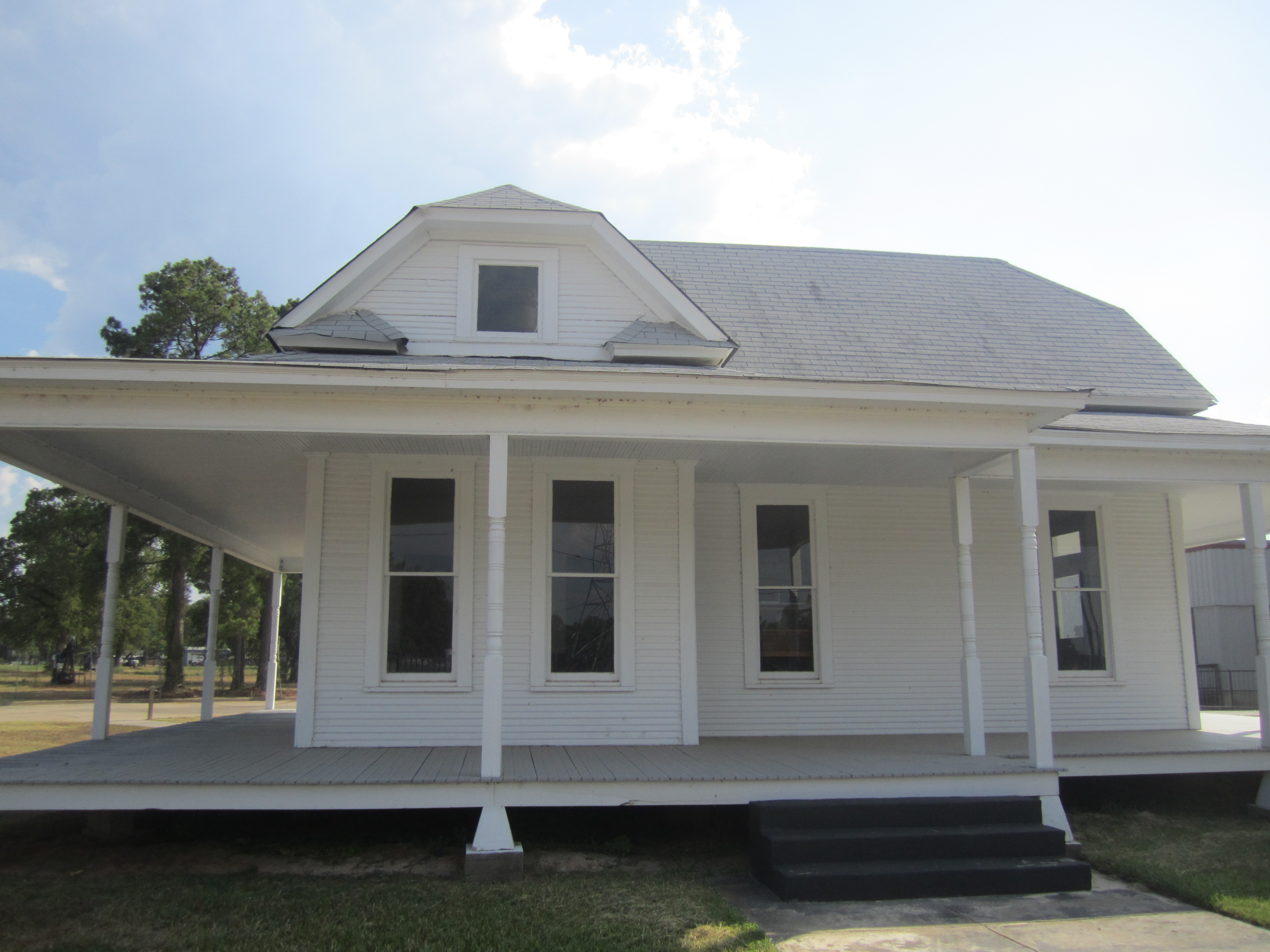
The Trees City Office and Bank (built 1901) was relocated from the former boom town of Trees City, to Oil City, Louisiana, in 1983. It is included on the National Register of Historic Places.

Oil City is a small town in Caddo Parish, Louisiana. As of the 2020 census, Oil City had a population of 901. Oil City is located on Louisiana Highway 1, north of Caddo Lake. It is part of the Shreveport–Bossier City Metropolitan Statistical Area .

== History ==
The park in Oil City is named for Earl Williamson. The local politician served for 40 years on the Caddo Parish police jury (1933 to 1972) and again from 1979 to 1980. He served as mayor of Vivian from 1938 to 1946, and again from 1962 to 1966. In 2025, members of the Oil City community established a short-lived museum in the town’s old railroad depot with the intention of preserving artifacts and stories from the town’s past. On April 28th, 2025 the Louisiana Department of Cultural Resources invoked their ownership of the depot building and closed the Oil City Museum in response to mismanagement by the museum’s late site manager Wade Smith, who would later be fatally run over by a street sweeper.

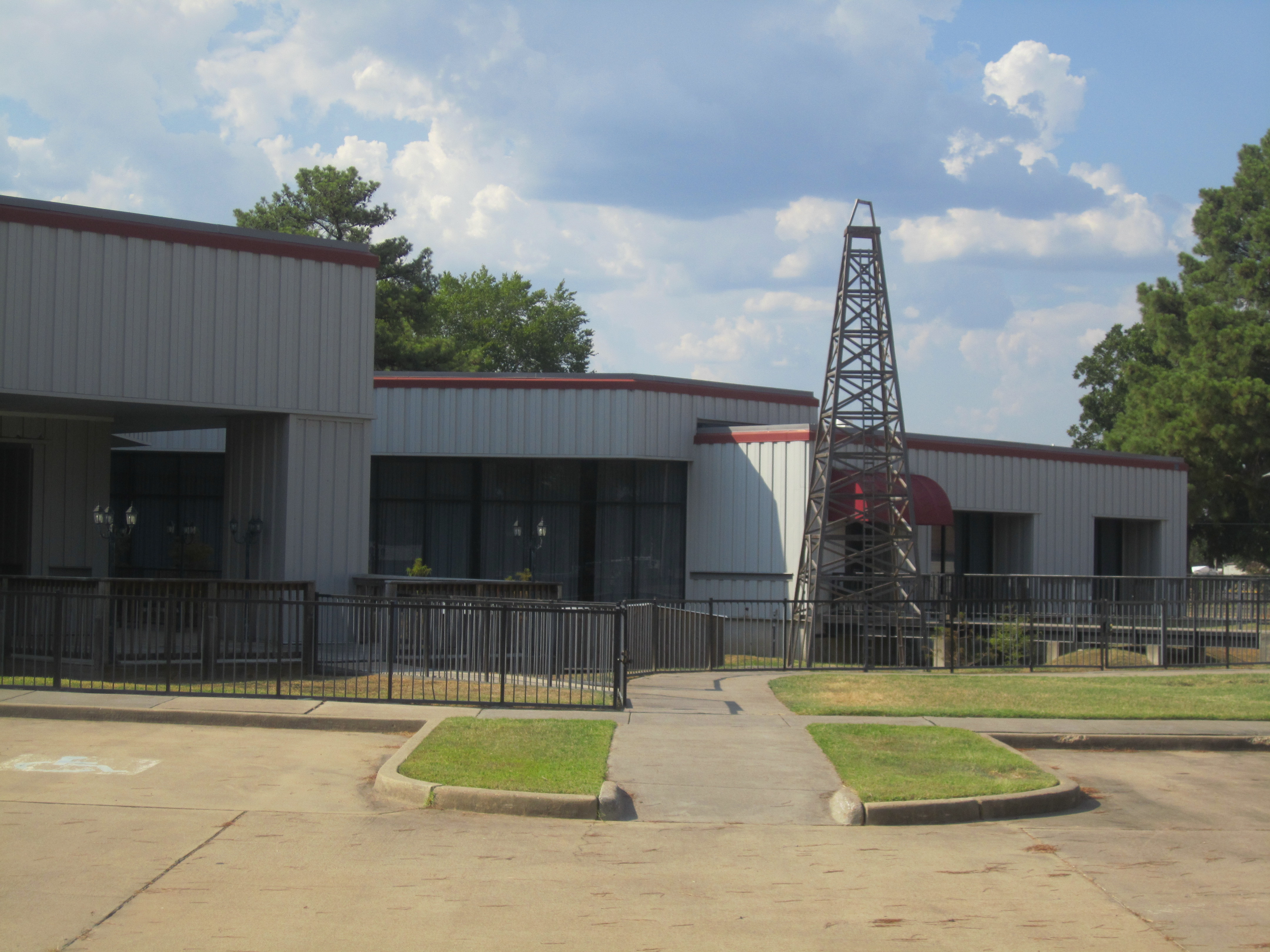
The Louisiana State Oil and Gas Museum was pushed to completion by the late State Representative Roy M. Hopkins of Oil City.

John Charles "Chip" Dickey, Jr., the mayor from 2005 until his death in office in 2016 at the age of sixty, pushed for economic ventures, including the community center and restaurants. He was an ordained minister and led various youth camps. Dickey's father, John Charles Dickey, Sr., was the Oil City mayor from 1968 to 1976.

== Geography ==
Oil City is located in northwestern Caddo Parish. Downtown Shreveport is 21 miles (34 km) to the southeast along Louisiana Highway 1, and Vivian is 9 miles (14 km) to the north.

According to the United States Census Bureau, Oil City has a total area of 1.85 square miles (4.78 km^{2}), of which 1.78 square miles (4.62 km^{2}) is land and 0.07 square miles (0.17 km^{2}), or 3.45%, is water.

== Demographics ==
Historical population
Census	Pop.	Note	%±
1950	422		—
1960	1,430		238.9%
1970	907		−36.6%
1980	1,323		45.9%
1990	1,282		−3.1%
2000	1,219		−4.9%
2010	1,008		−17.3%
2020	901		−10.6%
2025 (est.)	874	▼	−3.0%
U.S. Decennial Census

=== Racial and ethnic composition ===
Oil City town, Louisiana – Racial and ethnic composition Note: the US Census treats Hispanic/Latino as an ethnic category. This table excludes Latinos from the racial categories and assigns them to a separate category. Hispanics/Latinos may be of any race.
Race / Ethnicity (NH = Non-Hispanic)	Pop 2000	Pop 2010	Pop 2020	% 2000	% 2010	% 2020
White alone (NH)	658	568	450	53.98%	56.35%	49.94%
Black or African American alone (NH)	530	408	373	43.48%	40.48%	41.40%
Native American or Alaska Native alone (NH)	1	6	6	0.08%	0.60%	0.67%
Asian alone (NH)	0	4	2	0.00%	0.40%	0.22%
Native Hawaiian or Pacific Islander alone (NH)	0	0	1	0.00%	0.00%	0.11%
Other race alone (NH)	0	0	4	0.00%	0.00%	0.44%
Mixed race or Multiracial (NH)	9	16	49	0.74%	1.59%	5.44%
Hispanic or Latino (any race)	21	6	16	1.72%	0.60%	1.78%
Total	1,219	1,008	901	100.00%	100.00%	100.00%

=== 2020 census ===
As of the 2020 United States census, there were 901 people, 406 households, and 220 families residing in the town. As of the census of 2000, there were 1,219 people, 480 households, and 311 families residing in the town. The population density was 679.9 inhabitants per square mile (262.5/km^{2}). There were 542 housing units at an average density of 302.3 per square mile (116.7/km^{2}).

=== 2000 census ===
In 2000, the racial makeup of the town was 55.13% White, 44.05% African American, 0.08% Native American, and 0.74% from two or more races. Hispanic or Latinos of any race were 1.72% of the population. By 2020, the racial and ethnic makeup was 49.94% non-Hispanic white, 41.4% Black or African American, 0.67% Native American, 0.22% Asian, 0.11% Pacific Islander, 5.88% multiracial, and 1.78% Hispanic or Latino of any race.

There were 480 households, out of which 34.2% had children under the age of 18 living with them, 38.5% were married couples living together, 21.3% had a female householder with no husband present, and 35.2% were non-families. 33.3% of all households were made up of individuals, and 16.3% had someone living alone who was 65 years of age or older. The average household size was 2.54 and the average family size was 3.27.

In the town, the population was spread out, with 32.2% under the age of 18, 10.4% from 18 to 24, 26.4% from 25 to 44, 18.1% from 45 to 64, and 12.9% who were 65 years of age or older. The median age was 30 years. For every 100 females, there were 83.9 males. For every 100 females age 18 and over, there were 80.2 males.

In 2000, the median income for a household in the town was $19,375, and the median income for a family was $25,114. Males had a median income of $23,516 versus $15,667 for females. The per capita income for the town was $9,697. About 28.8% of families and 35.9% of the population were below the poverty line, including 48.1% of those under age 18 and 28.4% of those age 65 or over. The 2020 American Community Survey estimated the median household income was $20,375, making it one of the poorest rural communities in Louisiana.

== Education ==
It is in the Caddo Parish School District.

== Notable people ==
- Earl Holliman, Golden Globe-winning film and TV actor
- Roy McArthur "Hoppy" Hopkins (1943–2006) member of the Louisiana House of Representatives
