= John Wyble =

American politician

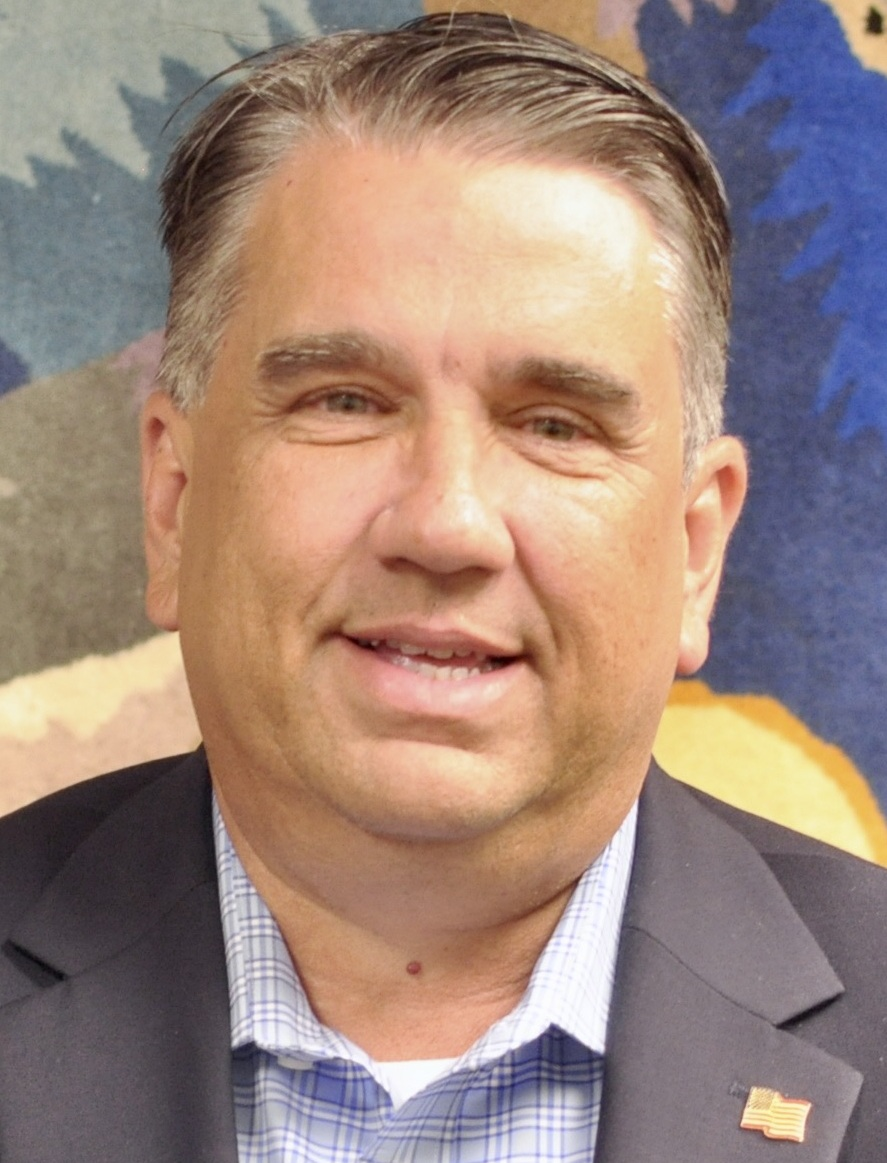

Member of the Louisiana House of Representatives from the 75th district
- Incumbent
- Assumed office January 8, 2024
- Preceded by: Malinda Brumfield White

Personal details
- Born: John E. Wyble
- Party: Republican
- Education: University of Southern Mississippi
- Profession: Executive leader, community advocate, politician

John E. Wyble is a politician from Washington Parish, Louisiana, who represents District 75 in the Louisiana House of Representatives. Wyble was previously the Washington Parish school board president.

== Early life and education ==
Wyble completed his undergraduate studies at the University of Louisiana Lafayette, earning a Bachelor of Science in agricultural business. He then earned a Master of Science degree in vocational education from Louisiana State University, followed by a doctoral degree in leadership and research from the University of Southern Mississippi.

== Career ==
Wyble is the Chief Executive Officer of an organization focused on advancing and improving literacy and the founder and president of Leadership Concepts by Dr. Wyble. He has advocated for education, healthcare, and economic independence.

Wyble announced his candidacy for the Louisiana House of Representatives District 75 in February 2023. He advanced to the general election after receiving 47.5% of the vote in the primary. In the runoff election held on November 18, 2023, Wyble won the seat, representing District 75, with 8,233 votes (70.22%) against Democrat Kelvin May, who received 3,491 votes (29.78%).
