= Michael Bayham =

American politician (1973/1974–2026)

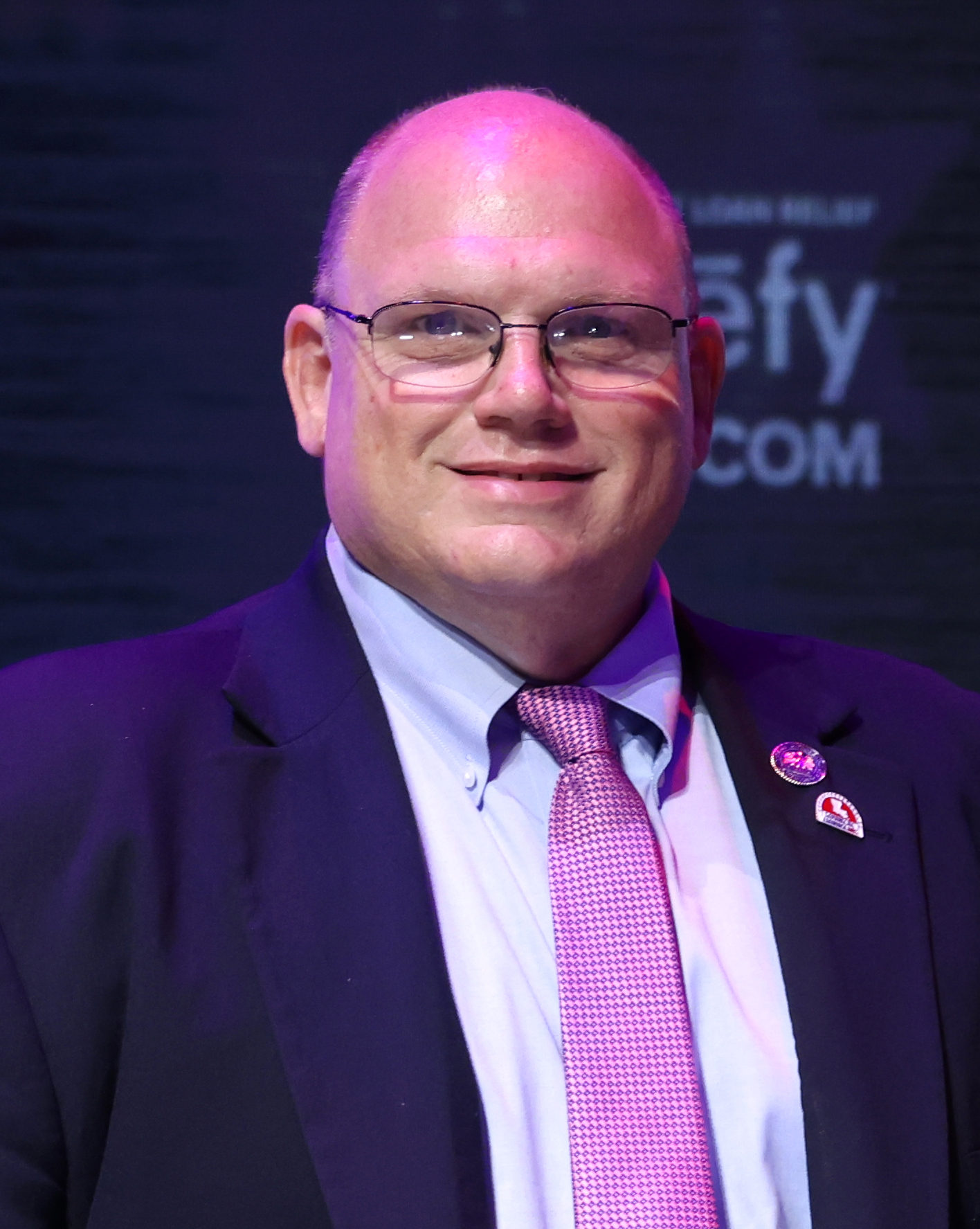

Member of the Louisiana House of Representatives from the 103rd district
- In office January 8, 2024 – November 12, 2026
- Preceded by: Ray Garofalo
- Succeeded by: TBA

Personal details
- Born: July 30, 1974 Chalmette, Louisiana, U.S.
- Died: November 12, 2026 (aged 52) Metairie, Louisiana, U.S.
- Party: Republican
- Education: Louisiana State University (BA)
- Occupation: Communications, marketing

Michael Robert Bayham Jr. (July 30, 1974 – November 12, 2026) was an American politician who served as a member of the Louisiana House of Representatives from the 103rd district. A member of the Republican Party, Bayham represented parts of St. Bernard Parish and was in office from January 8, 2024 until his death from liver failure at a hospital in Metairie, Louisiana, on November 12, 2026, at the age of 52.
