= Jonathan Goudeau =

American politician serving in the Louisiana House of Representatives

Member of the Louisiana House of Representatives from the 31st district
- In office January 13, 2020 – January 8, 2024
- Preceded by: Nancy Landry
- Succeeded by: Troy Hebert

Personal details
- Party: Republican

Jonathan I. Goudeau is an American politician who served as a member of the Louisiana House of Representatives from the 31st district from 2020 until 2024.

== Career ==
Goudeau lives in Lafayette, Louisiana. Prior to entering politics, he worked for the Lafayette Parish Sheriff's Office and was elected to the Louisiana House of Representatives in November 2019. Goudeau is a member of the House Conservative Caucus.

In 2021, he voted against the legalization of recreational marijuana and signed a letter of support for term limits in Congress. He introduced a bill that would give Atchafalaya Basin Bridge its own governing authority and police force but it was deferred. In 2022, he opposed increased accountability of the Louisiana State Police leader and voted to support the criminalization of in vitro fertilization and some forms of birth control. He is staunchly anti-abortion and has supported bills that propose the prosecution of women for murder if they receive abortions or miscarry (medically known as "spontaneous abortion") without exception for rape, incest, or protection of the life of the mother.
