= Stephanie Hilferty =

American politician (born 1985)

Member of the Louisiana House of Representatives from the 94th district
- Incumbent
- Assumed office January 11, 2016
- Preceded by: Nicholas Lorusso

Personal details
- Born: November 1985 (age 40)
- Party: Republican
- Spouse: Michael Lillis
- Children: 3
- Education: Loyola University New Orleans (BA)

Stephanie Anne Hilferty (born November 1985) is the Republican member of the Louisiana House of Representatives for District 94 in Orleans and Jefferson parishes. She is a commercial real estate sales and leasing agent with SRSA Commercial Real Estate in Metairie, Louisiana.

== Politics ==
In the primary election held on October 24, 2015, Hilferty unseated fellow Republican Representative Nicholas Lorusso, 6,866 votes (56.2 percent) to 5,343 (43.8 percent). She carried the backing of Gambit, the Times-Picayune, Greater New Orleans Republicans (GNOR), Orleans Parish Republican Executive Committee (OPREC), and former Louisiana Republican Party Chairman Roger F. Villere Jr. Lorusso had held the seat since 2007.

In the jungle primary on October 12, 2019, Hilferty won 41% (6,435 votes) of the vote, 7% ahead of Tammy Savoie (D) (5,317 votes) and 17% ahead of Kirk Williamson (3,852 votes). In the run-off election on November 16, 2019, with 56.2% turnout, Hilferty 59% (11,110 votes) defeated Tammy Savoie (D) 41% (7,809 votes), winning re-election.

In the primary held on October 14, 2023, Hilferty won 88% (9,157 votes) of the votes, 75% ahead of her opponent Charles Marsala, who won 12% (1,308 votes). According to the Louisiana Secretary of State, this was the largest margin of victory for any house seat during the primary. Additionally, she received at least 83% of the vote in every voting precinct.

In the Louisiana House of Representatives, Hilferty sits on the following three committees: 1) Commerce (Vice Chair) and 2) Natural Resources and Environment. She is also on the Legislative Audit Advisory Council, House Select Committee on Women and Children, and the House Select Leadership Committee. In the past she has also sat on the following committees: 1) Education, and 2) Municipal, Parochial and Cultural Affairs.

She is a member of the Jefferson Parish Legislative Delegation, the Louisiana Legislative Women's Caucus, the Louisiana Republican Legislative Delegation, and the Orleans Delegation.

== Louisiana House District 94 ==
Louisiana House District 94 includes 27 precincts in Orleans Parish and 12 precincts in Jefferson Parish. The Orleans Parish portion of District 94 includes the Lakeview neighborhood, New Orleans City Park, the Lakeshore neighborhood, the Lake Vista neighborhood, and parts of the Lake Terrace and Mid-City neighborhoods. The Jefferson Parish portion of District 94 includes part of the Bucktown neighborhood and also neighborhoods between West Esplanade and Lake Pontchartrain from the 17th Street Canal to the Suburban Canal.

== Personal life ==
Hilferty graduated from St. Mary's Dominican High School (2003) and Loyola University New Orleans (2007) where she graduated summa cum laude with a double major in English and psychology. At Loyola, Hilferty served as the president of the University Programming Board. Stephanie also was a member of the Alpha Chi Omega sorority.

Following her graduation from Loyola University, Hilferty started as a sales and leasing associate at SRSA Commercial Real Estate. At SRSA, Hilferty has represented a variety of national, regional and local tenants in office and retail. In 2016, Biz New Orleans named Hilferty one of the "Top Ten Influencers" in the residential and commercial markets.

Throughout her career, Hilferty has been a member of the Commercial Investment Division of New Orleans Metropolitan Association of Realtors, X Team International (retail real estate brokerage group), and Urban Land Institute, where she served as the Young Leaders chair. She previously was the president of the Lake Vista Property Owners Association.

Hilferty is married to Michael Lillis and they live in New Orleans' Lake Vista neighborhood with their three children.

== Awards ==
2007 Pattie Doll award for the most outstanding undergraduate psychology student (Loyola University, New Orleans)

2011 Highest First Time Recipient Award from the New Orleans Metropolitan Association of Realtors

2015 Loyola Young Alumna of the Year award by the Loyola University New Orleans Alumni Association's Young Alumni Pack

2018 Legislative Champion for the United Way of Southeast Louisiana

2018 Gold Achievement Award - Commercial Investment Division (CID) of the New Orleans Metropolitan Association of REALTORS®
