= Mark Wright (Louisiana politician) =

American politician

Majority Leader of the Louisiana House of Representatives
- In office January 8, 2024 – December 11, 2025
- Preceded by: Blake Miguez
- Succeeded by: Michael Echols

Member of the Louisiana House of Representatives from the 77th district
- In office December 8, 2017 – September 2026
- Preceded by: John Schroder
- Succeeded by: Vacant

Personal details
- Party: Republican
- Children: 5
- Education: Louisiana State University (attended); Xavier University (BA); University of Dallas (MA, MBA)

Mark A. Wright is an American politician who served as a member of the Louisiana House of Representatives from the 77th district. He assumed office on December 8, 2017.

== Education ==
Wright earned a Bachelor of Arts degree in political science from Xavier University of Louisiana and a dual Master of Politics–Master of Business Administration from the University of Dallas.

== Career ==
From 1998 to 2009, Wright worked as the vice president of the American Arbitration Association. From 2011 to 2017, he served as a member of the city council of Covington, Louisiana. Since 2009, he has worked as the vice president of American Waterways Operators, a trade association for the U.S. tugboat, towboat and barge industry. He was elected to the Louisiana House of Representatives in 2017. Wright also served as vice chair of the House Education Committee.

Wright resigned from the Louisiana House in September 2026 after being appointed to a position in the Louisiana Department of Transportation.

Louisiana House of Representatives
Preceded by Blake Miguez	Majority Leader of the Louisiana House of Representatives; 2024–2025	Succeeded by Michael Echols
