= List of special elections to the Louisiana House of Representatives =

This is a list of special elections to the Louisiana House of Representatives. Such elections are called by the presiding officer of the legislative chamber of where the vacancy took place, in this case the Speaker, to fill vacancies that occur when a member of the Louisiana House of Representatives dies or resigns before the next general election. Winners of these elections serve the remainder of the term and are usually candidates in the next election for their districts.

General elections are held in October and November in the years following the midterm elections.

== List of special elections ==
District	Legislature	Date	Predecessor	Winner	Cause
92	73rd	November 3, 2026	Joseph A. Stagni (R)	Gregory Carroll (D)	Resigned after election to the Kenner city council.
69	73rd	March 14, 2026	Paula Davis (R)	Paul Sawyer (R)	Resigned.
100	73rd	November 3, 2026	Jason Hughes (D)	Dana Henry (D)	Resigned after election to the New Orleans City Council.
37	73rd	February 7, 2026	Troy Romero (R)	Reese Broussard (R)	Resigned.
60	73rd	February 7, 2026	Chad Brown (D)	Chasity Martinez (D)	Resigned after named commissioner of the Office of Alcohol and Tobacco Control.
97	73rd	February 7, 2026	Matthew Willard (D)	Ed Murray (D)	Resigned after election to the New Orleans City Council.
67	73rd	May 3, 2025	Larry Selders (D)	Terry Landry Jr. (D)	Resigned after election to the State Senate.

== 73rd Legislature (2024–2028) ==
Representatives of the 73rd Louisiana Legislature were elected at the 2023 general election and will serve until the 2027 general election.

=== District 92 (2026) ===
The District 92 seat became vacant upon the resignation of incumbent Republican representative Joseph A. Stagni on June 30, 2026 after being elected to the city council of Kenner. Democrat Gregory Carroll won the seat outright in the primary on November 3, 2026, flipping the seat.

2026 Louisiana's 92nd state representative district special election Unofficial results
Primary election
Party	Candidate	Votes	%
Democratic	Gregory Carroll	6,620	57.59%
Republican	Mike Sigur	3,050	26.53%
Republican	Alex Perdomo	1,826	15.88%
Total votes		11,496	100.00%
Turnout			
Registered electors		25,622	
Democratic gain from Republican			

=== District 69 (2026) ===
The District 69 seat became vacant upon the resignation of incumbent Republican representative Paula Davis on January 9, 2026. Republican Paul Sawyer won the seat outright in the primary on March 14, 2026.

2026 Louisiana's 69th state representative district special election
Primary election
Party	Candidate	Votes	%
Republican	Paul Sawyer	2,587	53.29%
Democratic	Angela Roberts	1,945	40.06%
Republican	Lynn Coxe Graham	182	3.75%
Republican	Adam Beach	141	2.90%
Total votes		4,855	100.00%
Turnout		4,890	16.13%
Registered electors		25,622	
Republican hold			

=== District 100 (2026) ===
The District 100 seat became vacant upon the resignation of incumbent Democratic representative Jason Hughes on December 14, 2025, following his election to the New Orleans City Council. Five Democrats vied for the seat. The jungle primary took place on February 7, and the runoff took place on March 14. Democrat Dana Henry won the seat in the runoff.

2025 Louisiana's 100th state representative district special election
Primary election
Party	Candidate	Votes	%
Democratic	Kenya Rounds	1,355	33.15%
Democratic	Dana Henry	1,229	30.06%
Democratic	Patricia Boyd Robertson	624	15.26%
Democratic	Aeisha Kelly	588	14.38%
Democratic	Candice Taylor	292	7.14%
Total votes		4,088	100.00%
Turnout		4,143	14.73%
Registered electors		28,123	
General election
Democratic	Dana Henry	2,068	53.49%
Democratic	Kenya Rounds	1,798	46.51%
Total votes		3,866	100.00%
Turnout		3,916	13.78%
Registered electors		28,143	
Democratic hold			

=== District 37 (2026) ===
The District 37 seat became vacant upon the resignation of incumbent Republican representative Troy Romero on December 14, 2025. Republican Reese Broussard won the seat outright in the primary on February 7, 2026.

2026 Louisiana's 37th state representative district special election
Primary election
Party	Candidate	Votes	%
Republican	Reese Broussard	3,621	67.08%
No party preference	Ivy Woods	1,687	31.25%
Republican	Coy G. Myers	90	1.67%
Total votes		5,398	100.00%
Turnout		5,406	19.29%
Registered electors		28,022	
Republican hold			

=== District 60 (2026) ===
The District 60 seat became vacant upon the resignation of incumbent Democratic representative Chad Brown on November 18, 2025, following his appointment as commissioner of the Louisiana Office of Alcohol and Tobacco Control. Democrat Chasity Martinez won the seat outright in the primary on February 7, 2026.

2026 Louisiana's 60th state representative district special election
Primary election
Party	Candidate	Votes	%
Democratic	Chasity Martinez	5,159	61.95%
Republican	Brad Daigle	3,169	38.05%
Total votes		8,328	100.00%
Turnout		8,356	27.57%
Registered electors		30,312	
Democratic hold			

=== District 97 (2026) ===
The District 97 seat became vacant upon the resignation of incumbent Democratic representative Matthew Willard on October 29, 2025, following his election to the New Orleans City Council. Democrat Ed Murray won the seat outright in the primary on February 7, 2026.

2026 Louisiana's 97th state representative district special election
Primary election
Party	Candidate	Votes	%
Democratic	Ed Murray	2,727	53.20%
Democratic	Eugene Green	2,489	46.80%
Total votes		5,216	100.00%
Turnout		5,299	16.12%
Registered electors		32,871	
Democratic hold			

=== District 67 (2025) ===
The District 67 seat became vacant upon the resignation of incumbent Democratic representative Larry Selders on March 10, 2025, following his election to the Louisiana State Senate. Democrat Terry Landry Jr. won the seat outright in the primary on May 3, 2025.

2026 Louisiana's 67th state representative district special election
Primary election
Party	Candidate	Votes	%
Democratic	Terry Landry Jr.	1,499	51.80%
Democratic	Malcolm Myer	1,221	42.19%
Democratic	Sonny Marchbanks	174	6.01%
Total votes		2,894	100.00%
Turnout		3,095	14.42%
Registered electors		21,458	
Democratic hold			

== See also ==
- List of special elections to the Louisiana State Senate
