= 73rd Louisiana Legislature =

The 73rd Louisiana Legislature is the Louisiana State Legislature for the years 2024–2028.

== House of Representatives members ==
District	Name	Party	Parishes represented	First elected
1	Danny McCormick	Rep	Caddo	2019
2	Steven Jackson	Dem	Bossier and Caddo	2023
3	Tammy Phelps	Dem	Caddo	2019
4	Joy Walters	Dem	Caddo	2023
5	Dennis Bamburg Jr.	Rep	Bossier, Caddo and Red River	2023
6	Michael Melerine	Rep	Bossier and Caddo	2023
7	Larry Bagley	Rep	Caddo, DeSoto, and Sabine	2015
8	Raymond J. Crews	Rep	Bossier	2017
9	Dodie Horton	Rep	Bossier	2015
10	Wayne McMahen	Rep	Webster and Bossier	2018
11	Rashid Armand Young	Dem	Bienville, Claiborne, and Lincoln	2023
12	Christopher Turner	Rep	Lincoln and Union	2019
13	Jack McFarland	Rep	Bienville, Jackson, Natchitoches and Winn	2015
14	Michael Charles Echols	Rep	Ouachita	2019
15	Foy Bryan Gadberry	Rep	Ouachita	2019
16	Adrian Fisher	Dem	Morehouse and Ouachita parishes	2021
17	Pat Moore	Dem	Ouachita	2019
18	Jeremy LaCombe	Rep	Iberville, Pointe Coupee, West Baton Rouge, and West Feliciana	2019
19	Francis C. Thompson	Rep	East Carroll, Madison, Morehouse, Richland, and West Carroll	2019
20	Neil Riser	Rep	Caldwell, Catahoula, Franklin, LaSalle, and Ouachita	2019
21	C. Travis Johnson	Dem	Catahoula, Concordia, East Carroll, Franklin, Madison, and Tensas	2019
22	Gabe Firment	Rep	Grant, LaSalle and Natchitoches	2019
23	Shaun Mena	Dem	Orleans	2023
24	Rodney Schamerhorn	Rep	Beauregard, Sabine, and Vernon	2019
25	Jason Brian DeWitt	Rep	Natchitoches and Rapides	2023
26	Ed Larvadain III	Dem	Rapides	2019
27	Michael T. Johnson	Rep	Rapides	2019
28	Daryl Deshotel	Rep	Avoyelles and St. Landry	2019
29	Edmond Jordan	Dem	East Baton Rouge and West Baton Rouge	2016
30	Charles Owen	Rep	Beauregard and Vernon	2019
31	Troy Hebert	Rep	Lafayette and Vermilion	2023
32	R. Dewith Carrier	Rep	Allen, Beauregard, Calcasieu and Jefferson Davis	2019
33	Les Farnum	Rep	Calcasieu	2019
34	Wilford Carter	Dem	Calcasieu	2019
35	Brett Geymann	Rep	Beauregard and Calcasieu	2021
36	Phillip Tarver	Rep	Calcasieu	2019
37	Troy Romero	Rep	Calcasieu and Jefferson Davis	2019
38	Rhonda Gaye Butler	Rep	Evangeline and Rapides	2019
39	Julie Emerson	Rep	Lafayette	2015
40	Dustin Miller	Dem	St. Landry	2015
41	Phillip DeVillier	Rep	Acadia, Evangeline, and St. Landry	2015
42	Chance Keith Henry	Rep	Acadia and Lafayette	2023
43	Josh Carlson	Rep	Lafayette	2023
44	Tehmi Jahi Chassion	Dem	Lafayette	2023
45	Brach Myers	Rep	Lafayette	2023
46	Chad Michael Boyer	Rep	St. Landry, and St. Martin	2023
47	Ryan Bourriaque	Rep	Calcasieu, Cameron, and Vermilion	2019
48	Beau Beaullieu	Rep	Iberia, Lafayette, and St. Martin	2019
49	Jacob Jules Gabriel Landry	Rep	Iberia, Lafayette and Vermillion	2023
50	Vincent J. St. Blanc III	Rep	St. Martin and St. Mary	2019
51	Beryl Amedee	Rep	Assumption, Lafourche, St. Mary, and Terrebonne	2015
52	Jerome Zeringue	Rep	Terrebonne	2015
53	Jessica Domangue	Rep	Terrebonne	2023
54	Joseph Orgeron	Rep	Jefferson and Lafourche	2020
55	Bryan Fontenot	Rep	Lafourche	2019
56	Beth Anne Billings	Rep	St. Charles and St. John the Baptist	2023
57	Sylvia Elaine Taylor	Dem	St. Charles and St. John the Baptist	2023
58	Ken Brass	Dem	Ascension, St. James and St. John	2017
59	Tony Bacala	Rep	Ascension	2015
60	Chad Brown	Dem	Assumption and Iberville	2015
61	C. Denise Marcelle	Dem	East Baton Rouge	2015
62	Roy Daryl Adams	Dem	East Baton Rouge and East Feliciana	2019
63	Barbara West Carpenter	Dem	East Baton Rouge	2015
64	Kellee Hennessy Dickerson	Rep	East Baton Rouge and Livingston	2023
65	Lauren Ventrella	Rep	East Baton Rouge	2023
66	Emily Chenevert	Rep	East Baton Rouge	2023
67	Larry Selders	Dem	East Baton Rouge	2019
68	Dixon McMakin	Rep	East Baton Rouge	2023
69	Paula Davis	Rep	East Baton Rouge	2015
70	Barbara Reich Freiberg	Rep	East Baton Rouge	2019
71	Roger William Wilder III	Rep	Livingston	2023
72	Robby Carter	Dem	St. Helena, and Tangipahoa	2015
73	Kimberly Coates	Rep	Tangipahoa	2023
74	Peter F. Egan	Rep	St. Tammany	2023
75	John Wyble	Rep	Washington	2023
76	Stephanie Berault	Rep	St. Tammany	2023
77	Mark Wright	Rep	St. Tammany	2017
78	John R. Illg Jr.	Rep	Jefferson	2019
79	Debbie Villio	Rep	Jefferson	2019
80	Polly Thomas	Rep	Jefferson	2016
81	Jeffrey Wiley	Rep	Ascension, Livingston and St. James	2023
82	Laurie Schlegel	Rep	Jefferson	2021
83	Kyle M. Green Jr.	Dem	Jefferson	2019
84	Tim Kerner	Rep	Jefferson	2019
85	Vincent E. Cox III	Rep	Jefferson	2023
86	Nicholas Muscarello	Rep	Tangipahoa	2018
87	Rodney Lyons	Dem	Jefferson	2015
88	Kathy Edmonston	Rep	Ascension	2019
89	Christopher Kim Carver	Rep	St. Tammany	2023
90	Brian Glorioso	Rep	St. Tammany	2023
91	Mandie Landry	Dem	Orleans	2019
92	Joseph A. Stagni	Rep	Jefferson and St. Charles	2017
93	Alonzo Knox	Dem	Orleans	2023
94	Stephanie Hilferty	Rep	Jefferson and Orleans	2015
95	Shane Mack	Rep	Livingston and Tangipahoa	2023
96	Marcus Anthony Bryant	Dem	Iberia, Lafayette, and St. Martin	2019
97	Matthew Willard	Dem	Orleans	2019
98	Aimee Adatto Freeman	Dem	Orleans	2019
99	Candace N. Newell	Dem	Orleans	2019
100	Jason Hughes	Dem	Orleans	2019
101	Vanessa Caston LaFleur	Dem	East Baton Rouge	2022
102	Delisha Boyd	Dem	Orleans	2021
103	Michael Bayham	Rep	St. Bernard	2023
104	Jay Gallé	Rep	St. Tammany	2023
105	Jacob Braud	Rep	Jefferson, Orleans, and Plaquemines	2023

== Senate members ==
District	Name	Party	District Office	First elected
1	Bob Owen	Rep	Slidell / Chalmette	2023
2	Edward J. Price	Dem	Gonzales	2017
3	Joseph Bouie	Dem	New Orleans	2019
4	Jimmy Harris	Dem	New Orleans	2019
5	Royce Duplessis	Dem	New Orleans	2022
6	Rick Edmonds	Rep	Baton Rouge	2023
7	Gary M. Carter Jr.	Dem	New Orleans	2021
8	Patrick Connick	Rep	Marrero	2019
9	Cameron Henry	Rep	Metairie	2019
10	Kirk Talbot	Rep	River Ridge	2019
11	Patrick McMath	Rep	Covington	2019
12	Beth Mizell	Rep	Franklinton	2015
13	Valarie Hodges	Rep	Denham Springs	2023
14	Cleo Fields	Dem	Baton Rouge	2019
15	Regina Barrow	Dem	Baton Rouge	2015
16	Franklin J. Foil	Rep	Baton Rouge	2019
17	Caleb Kleinpeter	Rep	Brusly	2022
18	Eddie J. Lambert	Rep	Prairieville	2015
19	Gregory A. Miller	Rep	Norco	2023
20	Michael Fesi	Rep	Houma	2019
21	Robert Allain III	Rep	Franklin	2023
22	Blake Miguez	Rep	New Iberia	2023
23	Jean-Paul Coussan	Rep	Lafayette	2023
24	Gerald Boudreaux	Dem	Lafayette	2015
25	Mark Abraham	Rep	Lake Charles	2019
26	Bob Hensgens	Rep	Abbeville	2018
27	Jeremy Stine	Rep	Lake Charles	2021
28	Heather Cloud	Rep	Turkey Creek	2019
29	Jay Luneau	Dem	Alexandria	2015
30	Mike Reese	Rep	Leesville	2019
31	Alan Seabaugh	Rep	Shreveport	2023
32	Glen Womack	Rep	Harrisonburg	2019
33	Stewart Cathey Jr.	Rep	Monroe	2019
34	Katrina R. Jackson	Dem	Monroe	2019
35	Jay Morris	Rep	West Monroe	2019
36	Adam Bass	Rep	Bossier City	2023
37	Bill Wheat	Rep	Ponchatoula	2023
38	Thomas Pressly	Rep	Shreveport	2023
39	Sam Jenkins	Dem	Shreveport	2023

== See also ==
- List of Louisiana state legislatures
