= 2027 Louisiana House of Representatives election =

- October 9, 2027 (primaries); November 20, 2027 (general)

All 105 seats in the Louisiana House of Representatives 53 seats needed for a majority
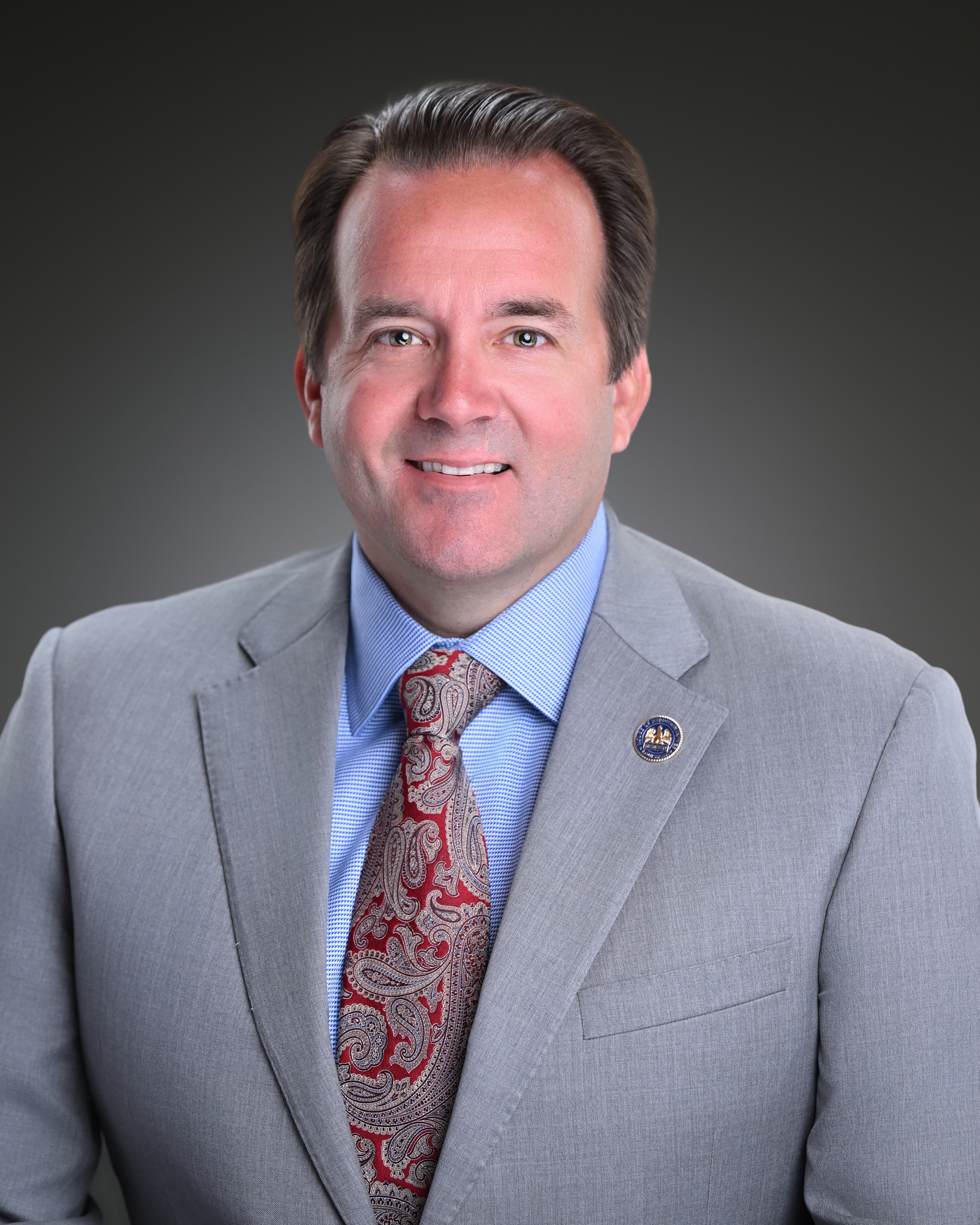

	Majority party	Minority party
Leader	Phillip DeVillier	Kyle Green
Party	Republican	Democratic
Leader since	January 8, 2024	October 29, 2025
Leader's seat	41st district	83rd district
Seats before	73	32
- Status of the incumbents: Democratic incumbent Term-limited Democrat; Republican incumbent Term-limited Republican
Speaker before election
Phillip DeVillier
Republican
Elected Speaker
TBD

The 2027 Louisiana House of Representatives election will be held on Tuesday, November 20, 2027. All 105 seats in the Louisiana House of Representatives will be up for election to four-year terms. It will be held concurrently with elections for all statewide offices and the Louisiana State Senate.

Under Louisiana's jungle primary system, all candidates appear on the same ballot, regardless of party, and voters may vote for any candidate, regardless of their party affiliation.

== Retirements ==
Nineteen incumbents will not seek re-election.

=== Democrats ===
1. District 29: Edmond Jordan was term-limited.
2. District 40: Dustin Miller was term-limited.
3. District 58: Ken Brass was term-limited.
4. District 61: C. Denise Marcelle was term-limited.
5. District 63: Barbara Carpenter was term-limited.
6. District 72: Robby Carter was term-limited.
7. District 87: Rodney Lyons was term-limited.

=== Republicans ===
1. District 7: Larry Bagley was term-limited.
2. District 8: Raymond Crews was term-limited.
3. District 9: Dodie Horton was term-limited.
4. District 13: Jack McFarland was term-limited.
5. District 41: Philip DeVillier was term-limited.
6. District 51: Beryl Amedee was term-limited.
7. District 52: Jerome Zenrigue was term-limited.
8. District 59: Tony Bacala was term-limited.
9. District 77: Mark Wright was term-limited.
10. District 80: Polly Thomas was term-limited.
11. District 92: Joseph A. Stagni was term-limited.
12. District 94: Stephanie Hilferty was term-limited.

== Mid-session special elections ==
District	Legislature	Date	Predecessor	Winner	Cause
92	73rd	November 3, 2026	Joseph A. Stagni (R)	Gregory Carroll (D)	Resigned after election to the Kenner city council.
69	73rd	March 14, 2026	Paula Davis (R)	Paul Sawyer (R)	Resigned.
100	73rd	November 3, 2026	Jason Hughes (D)	Dana Henry (D)	Resigned after election to the New Orleans City Council.
37	73rd	February 7, 2026	Troy Romero (R)	Reese Broussard (R)	Resigned.
60	73rd	February 7, 2026	Chad Brown (D)	Chasity Martinez (D)	Resigned after named commissioner of the Office of Alcohol and Tobacco Control.
97	73rd	February 7, 2026	Matthew Willard (D)	Ed Murray (D)	Resigned after election to the New Orleans City Council.
67	73rd	May 3, 2025	Larry Selders (D)	Terry Landry Jr. (D)	Resigned after election to the State Senate.

== See also ==
- 2027 United States state legislative elections
- 2027 Louisiana State Senate election
