= 1991 Louisiana State Senate election =

1991 Louisiana Senate election
- October 19, 1991 (primaries); November 13, 1991

All 39 seats in the Louisiana State Senate 20 seats needed for a majority
	Majority party	Minority party
Leader	Sammy Nunez
Party	Democratic	Republican
Leader since	May 13, 1990
Leader's seat	District 1
Last election	34 seats	5 seats
Seats before	32	6
Seats won	33	6
Seat change	▼1	▲1
Popular vote	1,081,794	390,207
Percentage	70.41%	25.40%
	Third party
Party	No party preference
Last election	0 seats
Seats before	1
Seats won	0
Seat change	Steady
Popular vote	64,529
Percentage	4.20%
- Results by party Democratic hold Democratic gain Republican hold Republican gain
President of the Senate before election
Sammy Nunez
Democratic
Elected President of the Senate
Sammy Nunez
Democratic

Elections to the Louisiana State Senate were held in 1991 to elect 39 candidates to the Senate to serve four-year terms. The Democratic Party won 33 seats to the Republicans' 6. Jungle primaries were held on October 19, with the general election taking place on November 13.

== Summary by district ==
District	Incumbent	Party	Elected senator	Party
1st	Sammy Nunez	Dem	Sammy Nunez	Dem
2nd	Jon D. Johnson	Dem	Jon D. Johnson	Dem
3rd	Dennis Bagneris	Dem	Dennis Bagneris	Dem
4th	Ben Bagert	Dem	Marc Morial	Dem
5th	Diana E. Bajoie (Note: Succeeded Democrat William J. Jefferson after a February 23, 1991 special election)	Dem	Diana E. Bajoie	Dem
6th	John J. Hainkel Jr.	Rep	John J. Hainkel Jr.	Rep
7th	Fritz Windhorst	Rep	Francis C. Heitmeier	Dem
8th	J. Chris Ullo	Dem	J. Chris Ullo	Dem
9th	Ken Hollis	Rep	Ken Hollis	Rep
10th	Francis E. Lauricella	Dem	Francis E. Lauricella	Dem
11th	Gerry E. Hinton	Rep	Gerry E. Hinton	Rep
12th	B. B. Rayburn	Dem	B. B. Rayburn	Dem
13th	Mike Cross	Dem	Mike Cross	Dem
14th	Cleo Fields	Dem	Cleo Fields	Dem
15th	Larry S. Bankston	Dem	Larry S. Bankston	Dem
16th	Kenneth E. Osterberger	Rep	John L. Dardenne Jr.	Rep
17th	J. E. Jumonville Jr.	Dem	Tom Greene	Dem
18th	Joe Sevario	Dem	Joe Sevario	Dem
19th	Ron Landry	Dem	Ron Landry	Dem
20th	Leonard J. Chabert	Dem	Marty J. Chabert	Dem
21st	Mike Foster	Dem	Mike Foster	Dem
22nd	Oswald Decuir	Dem	Oswald Decuir	Dem
23rd	Allen R. Bares	Dem	Max Jordan	Rep
24th	Armand J. Brinkhaus	Dem	Donald Cravins	Dem
25th	Cecil J. Picard	Dem	Cecil J. Picard	Dem
26th	Nell Doland (Note: Succeeded Democrat Jack Doland after a 1991 special election)	NPP	Armand J. Brinkhaus	Dem
27th	Jim Cox (Note: Succeeded Democrat Bill McLeod Jr. after a February 23, 1991 special election)	Dem	Jim Cox	Dem
28th	John Saunders	Dem	John Saunders	Dem
29th	Joe McPherson	Dem	Joe McPherson	Dem
30th	Bryan A. Poston	Dem	James David Cain	Dem
31st	Don Kelly	Dem	Don Kelly	Dem
32nd	Steve D. Thompson	Dem	Steve D. Thompson	Dem
33rd	Willie E. Crain	Dem	Willie E. Crain	Dem
34th	John C. Ensminger (Note: Succeeded Democrat Lawson L. Swearingen Jr. after a February 23, 1991 special election)	Rep	Charles D. Jones	Dem
35th	Randy L. Ewing	Dem	Randy L. Ewing	Dem
36th	Foster L. Campbell Jr.	Dem	Foster L. Campbell Jr.	Dem
37th	Sydney B. Nelson	Dem	Greg Barro	Dem
38th	Richard Neeson	Dem	Ron Bean	Rep
39th	Gregory Tarver	Dem	Gregory Tarver	Dem

== Open seats ==
Incumbents did not participate in 10 contests:

=== Democrats ===
1. District 4: Ben Bagert
2. District 20: Leonard J. Chabert
3. District 24: Armand J. Brinkhaus
4. District 30: Bryan A. Poston
5. District 37: Sydney B. Nelson
6. District 38: Richard Neeson

=== Republicans ===
1. District 7: Fritz Windhorst
2. District 16: Kenneth E. Osterberger
3. District 34: John C. Ensminger

=== No party ===
1. District 26: Nell Doland

== Incumbents defeated ==
=== In general election ===
1. District 17: Democrat J. E. Jumonville Jr. lost re-election to fellow Democrat Tom Greene.
2. District 23: Democrat Allen R. Bares lost re-election to Republican Max Jordan.

== Mid-session special elections ==
District	Legislature	Date	Predecessor	Winner	Cause
5	64th	February 23, 1991	William Jefferson (D)	Diana Bajoie (D)	Resigned after election to Louisiana's 2nd congressional district.
27	64th	February 23, 1991	Bill McLeod Jr. (D)	Jim Cox (D)	Resigned after election to a district judgeship.
34	64th	February 23, 1991	Lawson L. Swearingen Jr. (D)	John C. Ensminger (R)	Resigned after being named president of Northeast Louisiana University.
26	64th	September 6, 1991	Jack Doland (D)	Nell Doland (NP)	Died.

== Results ==
=== District 1 ===
1991 Louisiana's 1st State Senate district election
Primary election
Party	Candidate	Votes	%
Democratic	Sammy Nunez (incumbent)	29,553	68.18%
Democratic	Mary B. Faucheux	13,793	31.82%
Total votes		43,346	100.00%

=== District 2 ===
1991 Louisiana's 2nd State Senate district election
Primary election
Party	Candidate	Votes	%
Democratic	Jon D. Johnson (incumbent)	Unopposed	

=== District 3 ===
1991 Louisiana's 3rd State Senate district election
Primary election
Party	Candidate	Votes	%
Democratic	Dennis Bagneris (incumbent)	Unopposed	

=== District 4 ===
1991 Louisiana's 4th State Senate district election
Primary election
Party	Candidate	Votes	%
Democratic	Marc Morial	16,260	50.51%
Democratic	Kern A. Reese	7,020	21.81%
Democratic	Nick Varrecchio	5,950	18.48%
Democratic	Viki Williams	2,963	9.20%
Total votes		32,193	100.00%
Democratic hold			

=== District 5 ===
1991 Louisiana's 5th State Senate district election
Primary election
Party	Candidate	Votes	%
Democratic	Diana Bajoie (incumbent)	Unopposed	

=== District 6 ===
1991 Louisiana's 6th State Senate district election
Primary election
Party	Candidate	Votes	%
Republican	John J. Hainkel Jr. (incumbent)	23,164	61.67%
Republican	Herb Cammatte	14,399	38.33%
Total votes		37,563	100.00%

=== District 7 ===
1991 Louisiana's 7th State Senate district election
Primary election
Party	Candidate	Votes	%
Democratic	Francis C. Heitmeier	14,966	54.75%
Republican	Ed Markle	4,536	16.59%
Democratic	Betty A. Johnson	3,080	11.27%
Democratic	Pete Morton Jr.	1,893	6.93%
No party preference	Jim Gaudet	1,720	6.29%
Democratic	Albert Harry Gilson	1,139	4.17%
Total votes		27,334	100.00%
Democratic gain from Republican			

Republican Jean E. Riggins withdrew prior to the primary.

=== District 8 ===
1991 Louisiana's 8th State Senate district election
Primary election
Party	Candidate	Votes	%
Democratic	J. Chris Ullo (incumbent)	20,732	67.15%
Republican	Randal Barnett	5,333	17.27%
Democratic	Ron Besson	3,897	12.62%
No party preference	John W. Cotton	913	2.96%
Total votes		30,875	100.00%

=== District 9 ===
1991 Louisiana's 9th State Senate district election
Primary election
Party	Candidate	Votes	%
Republican	Ken Hollis (incumbent)	Unopposed	

=== District 10 ===
1991 Louisiana's 10th State Senate district election
Primary election
Party	Candidate	Votes	%
Democratic	Hank Lauricella (incumbent)	18,143	54.71%
Republican	George Ackel	11,860	35.76%
No party preference	Robert V. J. Buras	3,161	9.53%
Total votes		33,164	100.00%

=== District 11 ===
1991 Louisiana's 11th State Senate district election
Primary election
Party	Candidate	Votes	%
Republican	Gerry E. Hinton (incumbent)	19,939	55.76%
Democratic	Annette Fuselier	11,773	32.92%
Democratic	Malcolm 'Mackie' Gomez	4,047	11.32%
Total votes		35,759	100.00%

=== District 12 ===
1991 Louisiana's 12th State Senate district election
Primary election
Party	Candidate	Votes	%
Democratic	Sixty Rayburn (incumbent)	24,326	64.95%
Republican	Jerry Creel	8,424	22.49%
No party preference	Roy L. Crawford	4,701	12.55%
Total votes		37,451	100.00%

=== District 13 ===
1991 Louisiana's 13th State Senate district election
Primary election
Party	Candidate	Votes	%
Democratic	Mike Cross (incumbent)	19,650	44.99%
Democratic	Pete Heine	13,808	31.61%
Democratic	Rocky Powell	6,311	14.45%
Democratic	Greg Allen	3,911	8.95%
Total votes		43,680	100.00%
General election
Democratic	Mike Cross (incumbent)	28,234	57.57%
Democratic	Pete Heine	20,813	42.43%
Total votes		49,047	100.00%

=== District 14 ===
1991 Louisiana's 14th State Senate district election
Primary election
Party	Candidate	Votes	%
Democratic	Cleo Fields (incumbent)	Unopposed	

=== District 15 ===
1991 Louisiana's 15th State Senate district election
Primary election
Party	Candidate	Votes	%
Democratic	Larry S. Bankston (incumbent)	19,423	51.19%
Democratic	Tom Nelson	9,345	24.63%
Democratic	Johnnie L. Matthews	4,492	11.84%
Democratic	Jesse Stone	3,141	8.28%
Democratic	S. A. Salat	1,544	4.07%
Total votes		37,945	100.00%

=== District 16 ===
1991 Louisiana's 16th State Senate district election
Primary election
Party	Candidate	Votes	%
Republican	Lynda Imes	21,679	48.38%
Republican	Jay Dardenne	18,642	41.60%
No party preference	Michael S. Wolf	2,391	5.34%
Republican	Francis Pellegrin	2,098	4.68%
Total votes		44,810	100.00%
General election
Republican	Jay Dardenne	26,120	52.18%
Republican	Lynda Imes	23,934	47.82%
Total votes		50,054	100.00%
Republican hold			

=== District 17 ===
1991 Louisiana's 17th State Senate district election
Primary election
Party	Candidate	Votes	%
Democratic	J. E. Jumonville Jr. (incumbent)	21,286	46.92%
Democratic	Tom Greene	20,077	44.26%
Democratic	Michael Olinde	2,361	5.20%
Democratic	A. R. Harris Jr.	1,640	3.62%
Total votes		45,364	100.00%
General election
Democratic	Tom Greene	25,523	50.68%
Democratic	J. E. Jumonville Jr. (incumbent)	24,838	49.32%
Total votes		50,361	100.00%
Democratic hold			

=== District 18 ===
1991 Louisiana's 18th State Senate district election
Primary election
Party	Candidate	Votes	%
Democratic	Joe Sevario (incumbent)	22,215	47.00%
No party preference	Jeff' Diez	20,975	44.37%
Democratic	Michael J. Muller	4,079	8.63%
Total votes		47,269	100.00%
General election
Democratic	Joe Sevario (incumbent)	27,666	52.10%
No party preference	Jeff Diez	25,436	47.90%
Total votes		53,102	100.00%

=== District 19 ===
1991 Louisiana's 19th State Senate district election
Primary election
Party	Candidate	Votes	%
Democratic	Ron Landry (incumbent)	Unopposed	

=== District 20 ===
1991 Louisiana's 20th State Senate district election
Primary election
Party	Candidate	Votes	%
Democratic	Marty J. Chabert	15,970	44.14%
Republican	Paul E. Brown	5,635	15.58%
Democratic	Johnny Glover	5,440	15.04%
Democratic	Henry J. Lafont Jr.	3,843	10.62%
Democratic	Teddy Duhe	2,833	7.83%
Democratic	Becky Duet	1,667	4.61%
Republican	Richard J. Boquet Sr.	791	2.19%
Total votes		36,179	100.00%
General election
Democratic	Marty J. Chabert	25,092	61.66%
Republican	Paul E. Brown	15,600	38.34%
Total votes		40,692	100.00%
Democratic hold			

=== District 21 ===
1991 Louisiana's 21st State Senate district election
Primary election
Party	Candidate	Votes	%
Democratic	Mike Foster (incumbent)	30,836	85.49%
No party preference	Eddie Albares	5,232	14.51%
Total votes		36,068	100.00%

=== District 22 ===
1991 Louisiana's 22nd State Senate district election
Primary election
Party	Candidate	Votes	%
Democratic	Oswald Decuir (incumbent)	Unopposed	

=== District 23 ===
1991 Louisiana's 23rd State Senate district election
Primary election
Party	Candidate	Votes	%
Democratic	Allen R. Bares (incumbent)	15,269	41.54%
Republican	Max Jordan	10,041	27.32%
Republican	Carl Tritschler	7,285	19.82%
Republican	Max A. Menard	4,159	11.32%
Total votes		36,754	100.00%
General election
Republican	Max Jordan	24,527	60.18%
Democratic	Allen R. Bares (incumbent)	16,227	39.82%
Total votes		40,754	100.00%
Republican gain from Democratic			

=== District 24 ===
1991 Louisiana's 24th State Senate district election
Primary election
Party	Candidate	Votes	%
Democratic	Tommy DeJean	14,145	39.60%
Democratic	Don Cravins Sr.	11,694	32.74%
Democratic	Phyllis Coleman Mouton	8,469	23.71%
Democratic	Wilken Jones Jr.	1,409	3.94%
Total votes		35,717	100.00%
General election
Democratic	Don Cravins Sr.	25,275	58.82%
Democratic	Tommy DeJean	17,693	41.18%
Total votes		42,968	100.00%
Democratic hold			

=== District 25 ===
1991 Louisiana's 25th State Senate district election
Primary election
Party	Candidate	Votes	%
Democratic	Cecil Picard (incumbent)	Unopposed	

=== District 26 ===
1991 Louisiana's 26th State Senate district election
Primary election
Party	Candidate	Votes	%
Democratic	Armand J. Brinkhaus	20,838	55.02%
Democratic	Coach Castille	17,033	44.98%
Total votes		37,871	100.00%
Democratic gain from No party preference			

=== District 27 ===
1991 Louisiana's 27th State Senate district election
Primary election
Party	Candidate	Votes	%
Democratic	Jim Cox (incumbent)	17,054	49.03%
Democratic	Billy J. Moses	10,929	31.42%
Democratic	Dudley R. Dixon	6,803	19.56%
Total votes		34,786	100.00%
General election
Democratic	Jim Cox (incumbent)	21,561	53.34%
Democratic	Billy J. Moses	18,863	46.66%
Total votes		40,424	100.00%

=== District 28 ===
1991 Louisiana's 28th State Senate district election
Primary election
Party	Candidate	Votes	%
Democratic	John Saunders (incumbent)	32,949	76.79%
Democratic	Ted L. Nelson	9,957	23.21%
Total votes		42,906	100.00%

=== District 29 ===
1991 Louisiana's 29th State Senate district election
Primary election
Party	Candidate	Votes	%
Democratic	Joe McPherson (incumbent)	15,956	42.83%
Republican	Robert Bates	8,864	23.79%
Democratic	Charles Herring	7,114	19.10%
Democratic	Jay Chevalier	2,775	7.45%
Democratic	Bert A. Brown	2,543	6.83%
Total votes		37,252	100.00%
General election
Democratic	Joe McPherson (incumbent)	23,428	56.80%
Republican	Robert Bates	17,819	43.20%
Total votes		41,247	100.00%

=== District 30 ===
1991 Louisiana's 30th State Senate district election
Primary election
Party	Candidate	Votes	%
Democratic	James David Cain	17,527	55.69%
Democratic	Allen Bradley	13,947	44.31%
Total votes		31,474	100.00%
Democratic hold			

=== District 31 ===
1991 Louisiana's 31st State Senate district election
Primary election
Party	Candidate	Votes	%
Democratic	Don Kelly (incumbent)	29,410	75.39%
Republican	Randall T. Hayes	9,599	24.61%
Total votes		39,009	100.00%

=== District 32 ===
1991 Louisiana's 32nd State Senate district election
Primary election
Party	Candidate	Votes	%
Democratic	Steve D. Thompson (incumbent)	26,840	62.99%
Democratic	David I. Patten	8,684	20.38%
Democratic	'Ronnie' Mixon	7,087	16.63%
Total votes		42,611	100.00%

=== District 33 ===
1991 Louisiana's 33rd State Senate district election
Primary election
Party	Candidate	Votes	%
Democratic	Willie E. Crain (incumbent)	Unopposed	

Democratic Rosetta Hill Days withdrew prior to the primary.

=== District 34 ===
1991 Louisiana's 34th State Senate district election
Primary election
Party	Candidate	Votes	%
Democratic	Charles D. Jones	16,839	50.09%
Democratic	Mike' Thompson	15,226	45.29%
Democratic	Doyal McDade	1,555	4.63%
Total votes		33,620	100.00%
Democratic gain from Republican			

=== District 35 ===
1991 Louisiana's 35th State Senate district election
Primary election
Party	Candidate	Votes	%
Democratic	Randy L. Ewing (incumbent)	32,064	77.32%
Republican	Terry Ensley	9,404	22.68%
Total votes		41,468	100.00%

=== District 36 ===
1991 Louisiana's 36th State Senate district election
Primary election
Party	Candidate	Votes	%
Democratic	Foster L. Campbell Jr. (incumbent)	Unopposed	

=== District 37 ===
1991 Louisiana's 37th State Senate district election
Primary election
Party	Candidate	Votes	%
Democratic	Greg Barro	11,224	34.02%
Republican	Ron Fayard	10,228	31.00%
Democratic	Parker Self	9,723	29.47%
Republican	Leroy H. Scott Jr.	1,822	5.52%
Total votes		32,997	100.00%
General election
Democratic	Greg Barro	22,617	58.87%
Republican	Ron Fayard	15,803	41.13%
Total votes		38,420	100.00%
Democratic hold			

=== District 38 ===
1991 Louisiana's 38th State Senate district election
Primary election
Party	Candidate	Votes	%
Republican	Tommy G. Armstrong	13,354	39.51%
Republican	Ronald Clarence Bean	8,866	26.23%
Republican	'Ken' Wright	6,088	18.01%
Democratic	Bobby Shofner	5,494	16.25%
Total votes		33,802	100.00%
General election
Republican	Ronald Clarence Bean	20,474	50.94%
Republican	Tommy G. Armstrong	19,720	49.06%
Total votes		40,194	100.00%
Republican gain from Democratic			

=== District 39 ===
1991 Louisiana's 39th State Senate district election
Primary election
Party	Candidate	Votes	%
Democratic	Gregory Tarver (incumbent)	Unopposed	

== See also ==
- 1991 United States state legislative elections
