= Edwin R. Murray =

American politician (born 1960)

Edwin Renee "Ed" Murray

Louisiana State Senator for District 4
- In office 2005 – January 11, 2016
- Preceded by: Paulette Irons
- Succeeded by: Wesley T. Bishop

Louisiana State Representative for District 96 (Orleans Parish)
- In office 1992–2005
- Preceded by: Charles R. Jones

Personal details
- Born: August 6, 1960 (age 66)
- Party: Democratic
- Education: John F. Kennedy High School; Loyola University New Orleans
- Occupation: Attorney

Edwin Rene Murray, known as Ed Murray (born August 6, 1960) is an American lawyer and Democratic politician from New Orleans, Louisiana. From 2005 to 2016, he served in the Louisiana State Senate from District 4 in Orleans Parish.

A native and lifelong New Orleans resident, Murray graduated from John F. Kennedy High School and then studied at Loyola University, where he earned in 1982 a Bachelor of Arts in political science and in 1985 a Juris Doctor degree. From 1992 to 2004, Murray held the District 96 seat from Orleans Parish in the Louisiana House of Representatives.

Murray is a fellow of the Loyola University Institute of Politics. A partner in the general practice law firm of Murray, Darnell & Associates, Murray is a member of the African-American National Bar Association, the American Association for Justice, and the National Black Council of State Legislators. He is Baptist.

Late in 2009, Murray announced his candidacy for the 2010 election for Mayor of New Orleans, but he withdrew prior to the election.

Murray was term-limited in the 2015 elections and was succeeded in the Senate by Democrat Wesley T. Bishop.

Louisiana State Senate
Preceded by Paulette R. Irons	Louisiana State Senator for District 4 Edwin Rene Murray; 2005 – 2016	Succeeded by Wesley T. Bishop
