= 2027 Louisiana State Senate election =

- October 9, 2027 (primaries); November 20, 2027 (general)

All 39 seats in the Louisiana State Senate 20 seats needed for a majority
	Majority party	Minority party
Leader	Cameron Henry	Gerald Boudreaux (term-limited)
Party	Republican	Democratic
Leader since	January 8, 2024	May 10, 2021
Leader's seat	9th district	24th district
Last election	28 seats, 82.37%	11 seats, 16.93%
Seats before	28	10
- Status of the incumbents: Democratic incumbent Term-limited Democrat; Republican incumbent Term-limited Republican
President of the Senate before election
Cameron Henry
Republican
Elected President of the Senate
TBD

The 2027 Louisiana State Senate election will be held on Tuesday, November 20, 2027. All 39 seats in the Louisiana State Senate were up for election to four-year terms. It was held concurrently with elections for all statewide offices and the Louisiana House of Representatives.

Under Louisiana's jungle primary system, all candidates appear on the same ballot, regardless of party, and voters may vote for any candidate, regardless of their party affiliation.

== Summary by district ==
District	2024 pres.	Incumbent	Party	Elected senator	Party
1st	R+33.53	Bob Owen	Rep	TBD	
2nd	D+28.52	Ed Price	Dem	TBD	
3rd	D+52.34	Sidney Barthelemy II	Dem	TBD	
4th	D+62.69	Jimmy Harris	Dem	TBD	
5th	D+72.44	Royce Duplessis	Dem	TBD	
6th	R+39.23	Rick Edmonds	Rep	TBD	
7th	D+50.32	Gary Carter Jr.	Dem	TBD	
8th	R+24.68	Patrick Connick	Rep	TBD	
9th	R+16.25	Cameron Henry	Rep	TBD	
10th	R+32.96	Kirk Talbot	Rep	TBD	
11th	R+47.33	Patrick McMath	Rep	TBD	
12th	R+48.23	Beth Mizell	Rep	TBD	
13th	R+66.26	Valarie Hodges	Rep	TBD	
14th	D+49.92	Vacant		TBD	
15th	D+55.49	Regina Barrow	Dem	TBD	
16th	R+18.79	Franklin Foil	Rep	TBD	
17th	R+34.97	Caleb Kleinpeter	Rep	TBD	
18th	R+52.08	Eddie J. Lambert	Rep	TBD	
19th	R+25.71	Gregory A. Miller	Rep	TBD	
20th	R+63.48	Mike Fesi	Rep	TBD	
21st	R+41.84	Robert Allain III	Rep	TBD	
22nd	R+40.32	Blake Miguez	Rep	TBD	
23rd	R+45.19	Brach Myers	Rep	TBD	
24th	D+8.07	Gerald Boudreaux	Dem	TBD	
25th	R+51.79	Mark Abraham	Rep	TBD	
26th	R+62.06	Bob Hensgens	Rep	TBD	
27th	R+30.35	Jeremy Stine	Rep	TBD	
28th	R+50.43	Heather Cloud	Rep	TBD	
29th	D+21.22	Jay Luneau	Dem	TBD	
30th	R+71.93	Mike Reese	Rep	TBD	
31st	R+45.49	Alan Seabaugh	Rep	TBD	
32nd	R+64.45	Glen Womack	Rep	TBD	
33rd	R+54.16	Stewart Cathey Jr.	Rep	TBD	
34th	D+21.81	Katrina Jackson	Dem	TBD	
35th	R+62.09	Jay Morris	Rep	TBD	
36th	R+44.56	Adam Bass	Rep	TBD	
37th	R+41.04	Bill Wheat	Rep	TBD	
38th	R+22.62	Thomas Pressly	Rep	TBD	
39th	D+28.47	Sam Jenkins	Dem	TBD	

== Retirements ==
Six incumbents did not seek re-election.

=== Democrats ===
1. District 2: Ed Price was term-limited.
2. District 15: Regina Barrow was term-limited.
3. District 24: Gerald Boudreaux was term-limited.
4. District 29: Jay Luneau was term-limited.

=== Republicans ===
1. District 12: Beth Mizell was term-limited.
2. District 18: Eddie J. Lambert was term-limited.

== Mid-session special elections ==
District	Legislature	Date	Predecessor	Winner	Cause
14	73rd	February 15, 2025	Cleo Fields (D)	Larry Selders (D)	Resigned after election to Louisiana's 6th congressional district.
23	73rd	February 15, 2025	Jean-Paul Coussan (R)	Brach Myers (R)	Resigned after elected as Public Service Commissioner.
3	73rd	March 14, 2026	Joseph Bouie (D)	Sidney Barthelemy II (D)	Resigned after being named chancellor of the Southern University at New Orleans.
14	73rd	December 12, 2026	Larry Selders (D)	TBD	Died.

== See also ==
- 2027 United States state legislative elections
- 2027 Louisiana House of Representatives election
