= Louisiana's 69th House of Representatives district =

American legislative district

Louisiana's 69th State House of Representatives district
Representative
Paul Sawyer; R–Baton Rouge

Louisiana's 69th House of Representatives district is one of 105 Louisiana House of Representatives districts. It is currently represented by Republican Paul Sawyer.

== Geography ==
HD69 includes a portion of the city of Baton Rouge.

== Election results ==
Year	Winning candidate	Party	Percent	Opponent	Party	Percent	Opponent	Party	Percent	Opponent	Party	Percent
2007	Erich Ponti	Republican	63%	Bill Benedetto	Republican	37%						
2011 (Note: Incumbent ran unopposed.)	Erich Ponti	Republican	100%									
2015	Paula Davis	Republican	55.3%	Ryan Heck	Republican	44.7%						
2019	Paula Davis	Republican	78.8%	Ryan Lee	Libertarian	21.2%						
2023	Paula Davis	Republican	Cancelled									
2026 (special)	Paul Sawyer	Republican	53.3%	Angela Roberts	Democratic	40.1%	Lynn Coxe Graham	Republican	3.7%	Adam Beach	Republican	2.9%
