= Louisiana's 37th House of Representatives district =

American legislative district

Louisiana's 37th State House of Representatives district
Representative
| Reese Broussard; R–Jennings |

Louisiana's 37th House of Representatives district is one of 105 Louisiana House of Representatives districts. It is currently represented by Reese "Skip" Broussard.

== Geography ==
HD36 includes a small part of the city of Lake Charles, as well as the towns of Iowa, and Jennings.

== Election results ==
| Year | Winning candidate | Party | Percent | Opponent | Party | Percent | Opponent | Party | Percent |
|---|---|---|---|---|---|---|---|---|---|
| 2011 | John Guinn | Republican | 100% | | | | | | |
| 2015 | John Guinn | Republican | 100% | Daniel Rutledge | Independent | Withdrew | | | |
| 2019 | Troy Romero | Republican | 56% | Shalon Latour | Republican | 44% | | | |
| 2023 | Troy Romero | Republican | Cancelled | | | | | | |
| 2026 (special) | Reese Broussard | Republican | 67.1% | Ivy Woods | Independent | 31.3% | Coy Myers | Republican | 1.7% |
