= Senator Landry =

Senator Landry may refer to:

- Auguste Charles Philippe Robert Landry (1846–1919), Senate of Canada
- Pierre Caliste Landry (1841–1921), Louisiana State Senate
- Ron Landry (1943–2020), Louisiana State Senate

== See also ==
- Mary Landrieu (born 1955), U.S. Senator from Louisiana (1997–2015)
