= List of special elections to the Louisiana State Senate =

This is a list of special elections to the Louisiana State Senate. Such elections are called by the presiding officer of the legislative chamber of where the vacancy took place, in this case the President, to fill vacancies that occur when a member of the Louisiana State Senate dies or resigns before the next general election. Winners of these elections serve the remainder of the term and are usually candidates in the next election for their districts.

General elections are held in October and November in the years following the midterm elections.

== List of special elections ==
District	Legislature	Date	Predecessor	Winner	Cause
5	64th	February 23, 1991	William Jefferson (D)	Diana Bajoie (D)	Resigned after election to Louisiana's 2nd congressional district.
27	64th	February 23, 1991	Bill McLeod Jr. (D)	Jim Cox (D)	Resigned after election to a district judgeship.
34	64th	February 23, 1991	Lawson L. Swearingen Jr. (D)	John C. Ensminger (R)	Resigned after being named president of Northeast Louisiana University.
26	64th	September 6, 1991	Jack Doland (D)	Nell Doland (NP)	Died.
14	73rd	February 15, 2025	Cleo Fields (D)	Larry Selders (D)	Resigned after election to Louisiana's 6th congressional district.
23	73rd	February 15, 2025	Jean-Paul Coussan (R)	Brach Myers (R)	Resigned after elected as Public Service Commissioner.
3	73rd	March 14, 2026	Joseph Bouie (D)	Sidney Barthelemy II (D)	Resigned after being named chancellor of the Southern University at New Orleans.
14	73rd	December 12, 2026	Larry Selders (D)	TBD	Died.

== 73rd Legislature (2024–2028) ==
Senators of the 73rd Louisiana Legislature were elected at the 2023 general election and will serve until the 2027 general election.

=== District 14 (2025) ===
The District 14 seat became vacant upon the resignation of incumbent Democratic senator Cleo Fields on January 3, 2025 following his election to the U.S. House. Three Democrats vied for the seat. State representative from the 67th district Larry Selders won the seat outright in the primary on February 15, 2025. Selders would die a year into his term, aged 44.

2025 Louisiana's 14th State Senate district special election
Primary election
Party	Candidate	Votes	%
Democratic	Larry Selders	4,153	62.39%
Democratic	Carolyn Hill	1,355	20.35%
Democratic	Quentin Anthony Anderson	1,149	17.26%
Total votes		6,657	100.00%
Turnout		6,697	9.59%
Registered electors		69,822	
Democratic hold			

=== District 23 (2025) ===
The District 23 seat became vacant upon the resignation of incumbent Republican senator Jean-Paul Coussan on January 1, 2025 following his election to the Louisiana Public Service Commission. Two Republicans vied for the seat. State representative from the 45th district Brach Myers won the seat outright in the primary on February 15, 2025.

2025 Louisiana's 23rd State Senate district special election
Primary election
Party	Candidate	Votes	%
Republican	Brach Myers	6,769	54.77%
Republican	Jesse Regan	5,591	45.23%
Total votes		12,360	100.00%
Turnout		12,734	14.57%
Registered electors		87,412	
Republican hold			

=== District 3 (2026) ===
The District 3 seat became vacant upon the resignation of incumbent Democratic senator Joseph Bouie on October 15, 2025. Four Democrats vied for the seat. The jungle primary took place on February 7, and the runoff took place on March 14. Sidney Barthelemy II, the son of former New Orleans mayor Sidney Barthelemy, won the seat in the runoff.

2026 Louisiana's 3rd State Senate district special election
Primary election
Party	Candidate	Votes	%
Democratic	Sidney Barthelemy II	4,884	43.62%
Democratic	Kenn Barnes	2,434	21.74%
Democratic	Chad Lauga	2,150	19.20%
Democratic	Jon Johnson	1,729	15.44%
Total votes		11,197	100.00%
Turnout		11,324	13.99%
Registered electors		80,951	
General election
Democratic	Sidney Barthelemy II	5,408	63.78%
Democratic	Kenn Barnes	3,071	36.22%
Total votes		8,479	100.00%
Turnout		8,555	10.56%
Registered electors		80,992	
Democratic hold			

=== District 14 (2026) ===
The District 14 seat became vacant upon the death of incumbent Democratic senator Larry Selders on July 7, 2026. Democratic U.S. Representative Cleo Fields, who previously represented this seat and sat out the U.S. House election, is running for this seat against Joel Porter. Should he win this seat, Fields would become the first person in Louisiana State Senate history to be elected to the chamber for four separate periods. The jungle primary will take place December 12, 2026.

2026 Louisiana's 14th State Senate district special election
Primary election
Party	Candidate	Votes	%
Democratic	Cleo Fields		
No party preference	Joel Porter		
Total votes			

== 64th Legislature (1988–1992) ==
=== District 5 (1991) ===
The District 5 seat became vacant upon the resignation of incumbent Democratic senator William Jefferson in January 1991 following his election to the U.S. House. Democrat Diana Bajoie won the seat outright in the primary on February 23, 1991.

1991 Louisiana's 5th State Senate district special election
Primary election
Party	Candidate	Votes	%
Democratic	Diana Bajoie	4,389	53.06%
Democratic	Doug Evans	1,802	21.78%
Republican	Gay Cunningham	1,690	20.43%
Democratic	Keith Doley	303	3.66%
No party preference	Rudy E. Mills Sr.	88	1.06%
Total votes		8,272	100.00%
Democratic hold			

=== District 27 (1991) ===
The District 27 seat became vacant upon the resignation of incumbent Democratic senator Bill McLeod Jr. on January 1, 1991, following his election as a district judge. Democrat Jim Cox won the seat outright in the primary on February 23, 1991.

1991 Louisiana's 27th State Senate district special election
Primary election
Party	Candidate	Votes	%
Democratic	Jim Cox	10,321	58.21%
Republican	Vic Stelly	5,475	30.88%
Democratic	Al Willis	1,462	8.25%
Democratic	Sam Tarleton	473	2.67%
Total votes		17,731	100.00%
Democratic hold			

=== District 34 (1991) ===
The District 5 seat became vacant upon the resignation of incumbent Democratic senator Lawson L. Swearingen Jr. on January 11, 1991 to become president of Northeast Louisiana University; effective March 24. Republican state representative John C. Ensminger won the seat outright in the primary on February 23, 1991.

1991 Louisiana's 34th State Senate district special election
Primary election
Party	Candidate	Votes	%
Republican	John C. Ensminger	10,799	53.25%
Democratic	Frank Snellings	8,937	44.07%
Democratic	John H. Powell	542	2.67%
Total votes		20,278	100.00%
Republican gain from Democratic			

=== District 26 (1991) ===
The District 26 seat became vacant upon the death of incumbent Democratic senator Jack Doland on April 25, 1991. His widow Nell Doland filed for the seat as a non-party candidate, and was automatically elected at the close of candidate qualifications as she went unopposed. The election would have taken place on October 19, 1991.

1991 Louisiana's 26th State Senate district special election
Primary election
Party	Candidate	Votes	%
No party preference	Nell Doland	Unopposed	
No party preference gain from Democratic			

== See also ==
- List of special elections to the Louisiana House of Representatives
