= Foy Gadberry =

American politician

Foy Bryan Gadberry

Member of the Louisiana House of Representatives from the 15th district
- Incumbent
- Assumed office January 2020
- Preceded by: Frank Hoffman

Personal details
- Party: Republican
- Education: Louisiana Tech University
- Occupation: Engineering Consultant

Foy Bryan Gadberry is a Republican member of the Louisiana House of Representatives for District 15, which encompasses Calhoun, Claiborne, and parts of West Monroe. On January 8, 2020, Gadberry succeeded outgoing Republican Representative Frank Hoffman, who was term limited and ineligible to run for re-election. He won the 2019 election with 8,092 votes (53.2%), beating fellow Republican Justin Tidwell, who received 7,114 votes (46.8%). He also won the Blanket primary with 4,881 votes (37.8%), beating Tidwell who got 3,815 votes (29.5%), Drake Graves with 2,821 votes (21.9%), and lastly, Ryan Reid with 1,397 votes (10.8%).

Gadberry resides in West Monroe, and is an engineering consultant.

Louisiana House of Representatives
Preceded by Frank Hoffman	Louisiana State Representative for District 15 (Calhoun, Claiborne, West Monroe); 2020 –	Succeeded by Incumbent
