= Louisiana's 60th House of Representatives district =

American legislative district

Louisiana's 60th State House of Representatives district
Representative
Chasity Martinez; D–Plaquemine

Louisiana's 60th House of Representatives district is one of 105 Louisiana House of Representatives districts. It is currently held by Chasity Martinez.

== Geography ==
HD60 includes the cities of Plaquemine, St. Gabriel, the village of Napoleonville, and the community of Plattenville.

== Election results ==
Year	Winning candidate	Party	Percent	Opponent	Party	Percent	Opponent	Party	Percent	Opponent	Party	Percent
2003	Karen St. Germaine	Democratic	52%	Emma Deviller	Republican	48%						
2007	Karen St. Germaine	Democratic	Cancelled									
2011	Karen St. Germaine	Democratic	86.1%	Jason Morris	Republican	13.9%						
2015 (Note: Primary elections in which no candidate receives a plurality of 50% or more would result in a general between the top two candidates, however Barker's withdrawal allowed Brown to win by default as the general election was cancelled.)	Chad Brown	Democratic	46%	James Barker	Independent	25.6% (Withdrawn)	Mike Latino	Republican	18.8%	Thomas Gaudet	Democratic	9.6%
2019	Chad Brown	Democratic	100%									
2023	Chad Brown	Democratic	Cancelled									
2026 (special)	Chasity Martinez	Democratic	62%	Brad Daigle	Republican	38.1%						
