= Louisiana's 100th House of Representatives district =

American legislative district

Louisiana's 100th State House of Representatives district
Representative
Dana Henry; D–New Orleans

Louisiana's 100th House of Representatives district is one of 105 Louisiana House of Representatives districts. It is currently represented by Democrat Dana Henry.

== Geography ==
HD100 is located entirely inside of the city of New Orleans.

== Election results ==
Year	Winning candidate	Party	Percent	Opponent	Party	Percent
2011	Austin Badon	Democratic	Cancelled			
2015	John Bagneris	Democratic	54.9%	Alicia Clivens	Democratic	45.1%
2019	Jason Hughes	Democratic	66.3%	Anthony Jackson Jr.	Democratic	33.7%
2023	Jason Hughes	Democratic	Cancelled			
2026 (special)	Dana Henry	Democratic	53.5%	Kenya Rounds	Democratic	46.5%
