= Louisiana's 34th House of Representatives district =

American legislative district

Louisiana's 34th State House of Representatives district
Representative
Wilford Dan Carter Sr. D–Lake Charles

Louisiana's 34th House of Representatives district is one of 105 Louisiana House of Representatives districts. It is currently represented by Republican Wilford Dan Carter Sr. of Lake Charles.

== Geography ==
HD34 includes part of the city of Lake Charles, including Chennault International Airport.

== Election results ==
Year	Winning candidate	Party	Percent	Opponent	Party	Percent	Opponent	Party	Percent
2011	Albert Franklin	Democratic	78.1%	Paul Geary	Democratic	21.9%			
2015	Albert Franklin	Democratic	50.6%	Wilford Dan Carter Sr.	Democratic	48.4%			
2019	Wilford Dan Carter Sr.	Democratic	57.2%	Kevin Guidry	Democratic	42.8%			
2023	Wilford Dan Carter Sr.	Democratic	62.2%	Kevin Guidry	Democratic	29.9%	Franklin Lewis Sr.	Democratic	7.9%
