= Larry Bagneris Jr. =

American social and political activist (born 1946)

- Born: Lawrence Bagneris Jr. September 15, 1946 (age 80); New Orleans, Louisiana, U.S.
- Education: Xavier University of Louisiana; B.A., Political Science and History; St. Augustine High School (New Orleans)
- Occupations: Former Executive Director, Human Relations Commission
- Employer: City of New Orleans
- Term: 1999–2018
- Political party: Democratic
- Relatives: Gloria Diaz Bagneris (Mother) Lawrence Bagneris Sr. (Father); Vernel Bagneris (Brother); John Bagneris (Cousin)

Lawrence "Larry" Bagneris Jr. (born September 15, 1946) is an American social and political activist from New Orleans, Louisiana. Bagneris' career has focused on improving government relations with the African American and LGBT communities.

== Early life and education ==
Larry Bagneris is the son of Gloria Diaz Bagneris and Lawrence Bagneris Sr., who had four children. Bagneris' brother, Vernel Bagneris, is an actor, playwright and musician. His father was a postal clerk and a veteran who served during World War II. Bagneris' mother was the manager of the Bagneris house.

Bagneris and his family initially resided in the Creole Seventh Ward neighborhood of New Orleans. Due to a U.S. Federal program of "Urban Renewal" of the 1960s, the Bagneris family relocated to the Gentilly neighborhood of New Orleans. The program was referred to as "The Negro Removal", which saw the creation of a highway overpass through the community that invited crime and drove down the property values of the Seventh Ward.

Bagneris and his brother attended St. Augustine High School in New Orleans. It was at St. Augustine that Larry began to become interested in political activism. Bagneris realized he was gay while at school, and was offered shock treatment as conversion therapy, which Bagneris rejected.

In 1969, Bagneris graduated from Xavier University of Louisiana with a bachelor's degree in political science. After college, he began a job at Washington National Insurance Co., which allowed him to travel frequently.

== Early activism ==
Bagneris' first involvement in racial activism was at the age of 16. He participated in picketing Maison Blanche Department Stores in New Orleans for their usage of Jim Crow style policies. The pickets that Larry participated in eventually led to sit-in protests. Bagneris was arrested at sit-ins at FrosTop, Walgreens and Woolworth's. Because he was only sixteen when these events occurred, he was only held as a juvenile.

While in high school, Bagneris participated in the 1963 National Conference for International Justice in Memphis, Tennessee with faculty and students from St. Augustine High School.

In 1967, Bagneris was elected Vice-chair of the Young Democrats of New Orleans, making him the first Black person to hold the role.

== LGBT activism ==
In June 1969, Bagneris visited New York City with a gay friend. While there, he encountered the diversity of the LGBT awakening and escaped a raid on the Stonewall Inn. This was an "awakening" for Bagneris, as he realized the necessity of joining the gay rights movement.

Bagneris moved to Houston in summer 1969, choosing the location based on its LGBT community. There, he worked at a Foley’s department store. He became involved with local LGBT organizations, which included The Diana Foundation and the Gay Political Caucus.

Bagneris served on the national planning committee for the first March on Washington for Gay Rights, which he attended in October 1979. In 1980, he became the first openly gay delegate to the Democratic National Committee. In 1981, he served as a keynote speaker at the Southeastern Conference for Lesbians and Gays, held at Louisiana State University in Baton Rouge.

As a member of the Gay Political Caucus, Bagneris recruited African-American and Latino members. In 1979, he became the caucus's Vice President, and, later in 1982, its president. Bagneris also organized Houston's first pride parade in 1979, despite hostilities from the city's police chief during negotiations for permits. He continued to organize the annual parade until 1986, when he moved back to New Orleans with his partner, Jimmy Chavers Armstrong (d. 1990).

== Later activism in New Orleans ==
Bagneris worked for the NO/AIDS Task Force as its community affairs director from 1990 to 2000. Through this position, Bagneris would educate state legislators about the AIDS virus, and also had a hand in defeating at least 63 bills which were regarded as detrimental to those living with the disease.

In 1990, Bagneris ran for the District C New Orleans city council seat, a district in New Orleans with a conservative white majority, beating 16 other candidates to advance to the runoff election; he lost the runoff with 40% of the vote. He again ran for office on three occasions in 1991, 1995 and 1999, unsuccessfully vying for House District 93; this Louisiana House District had been represented by Avery Alexander, a former civil rights acts who had also previously participated in marches with Martin Luther King Jr, from 1976 to 1999, and then Karen Carter. Bagneris would manage to successfully reach the runoff elections in both his 1995 and 1999 runs for House District 93, before ultimately losing both runoff elections respectively to Alexander and then Carter. Though unsuccessful in all of his three runs for a Louisiana House of Representatives seat, Bagneris still nevertheless managed to garner great visibility for the LGBT community each time he ran, including through the endorsements he received each time as well.

Bagneris served as a member of the City of New Orleans Human Relations Commission for 12 years; he then served as its executive director from 1999 to 2018, when he retired. In 2004, he was appointed liaison to the New Orleans City Council.

== Personal life ==
As of 2022, Bagneris lives in the French Quarter of New Orleans. He returns to Houston each year, to attend the city's pride parade.

== Recognition ==
He received the Harvey Milk award in 1983.

In 2010, the ACLU of Louisiana awarded Bagneris the Ben Smith award, which "is given annually to someone with a demonstrated commitment to the advancement of civil liberties in Louisiana".

The Amistad Research Center has hosted his papers since 2011.

In 2022, a ball was held in Houston in Bagneris' honor. That same year, he served as the grand marshal of Houston's pride parade.
