= Albert Franklin =

American politician

Member of the Louisiana House of Representatives for District 34
- In office 2008–2020
- Succeeded by: Wilford Dan Carter Sr.

Personal details
- Born: September 1948 (age 77)
- Party: Democratic

Albert B. Franklin, also known as A. B. Franklin, (born September 1948) is an American politician who served in the Louisiana House of Representatives. Franklin endorsed the Hillary Clinton 2016 presidential campaign.
