= Jonathan Perry (politician) =

American politician (born 1973)

Jonathan Wayne "JP" Perry

District 4F Judge on the Louisiana Court of Appeal for the Third Circuit (all of Vermilion and portions of Acadia and Lafayette parishes)
- Incumbent
- Assumed office January 1, 2019
- Preceded by: Marc T. Amy

Louisiana State Senator for District 26 (Vermilion, Acadia, Lafayette, and St. Landry parishes)
- In office March 11, 2011 – 2018
- Preceded by: Nick Gautreaux
- Succeeded by: Bob Hensgens

Louisiana State Representative for District 47 (Vermilion and Cameron parishes)
- In office January 14, 2008 – March 11, 2011
- Preceded by: Joseph Lloyd "Mickey" Frith
- Succeeded by: Bob Hensgens

Personal details
- Born: January 27, 1973 (age 53) Kaplan, Vermilion Parish; Louisiana
- Party: Republican
- Spouse: Christine LeBeouf Perry
- Children: Molli, Meredith, Major, and Marlee Perry
- Education: Kaplan High School University of Louisiana at Monroe Southern University Law Center
- Occupation: Attorney; Judge, comedian Former police officer

Jonathan Wayne Perry, known as JP Perry (born January 27, 1973), is the District 4F judge on the Louisiana Court of Appeal for the Third Circuit. Perry ran unopposed for the judgeship in the November 6, 2018 primary election, held in conjunction with general elections for Congress in the forty-nine other states. Perry assumed the post on January 1, 2019.

Preceded by Marc T. Amy (first elected in 1994)	Judge of the Louisiana Third Circuit Court of Appeal, District 4F (all of Vermilion and portions of Acadia and Lafayette parishes); Jonathan Wayne Perry; 2019–	Succeeded by Incumbency pending
Louisiana State Senate
Preceded by Nick Gautreaux	Louisiana State Senator for District 26 (Vermilion, Acadia, Lafayette, and St. Landry parishes); Jonathan Wayne Perry; 2011-2018	Succeeded by Bob Hensgens
Louisiana House of Representatives
Preceded by Joseph Lloyd "Mickey" Frith	Louisiana State Representative for District 47 (Vermilion and Cameron parishes); Jonathan Wayne Perry; 2008–2011	Succeeded by Bob Hensgens
