= Vernel Bagneris =

American dramatist (born 1949)

- Born: Vernel Martin Bagneris; July 31, 1949 (age 77); New Orleans, Louisiana, U.S.
- Occupations: Entertainer, Actor, Director, Playwright
- Term: 1999–2018
- Relatives: Gloria Diaz Bagneris (Mother) Lawrence Bagneris Sr. (Father); Larry Bagneris Jr. (Brother); John Bagneris (Cousin)

Vernel Martin Bagneris (born July 31, 1949) is an American playwright, theater director, and entertainer.

== Early life ==
Bagneris was born in New Orleans, Louisiana, United States, the third child of Gloria Diaz Bagneris and Lawrence Bagneris Sr. His mother was a deeply Catholic housewife, and his father was a World War II veteran and postal clerk.

Bagneris grew up in the tight-knit, predominantly Creole Seventh Ward of New Orleans in a family of free people of color that had been in the city since 1750. He began dancing and playing music from early childhood.

In the mid-1960s, amid rapid changes in the character of the area, the Bagneris family moved to Gentilly, New Orleans, along with many other residents of the Seventh Ward. Bagneris was in the advanced placement track at St. Augustine High School. He graduated in 1967, and in the fall of the same year, he went to a seminary to study for the priesthood, though he stayed there only three days.

Bagneris was admitted to Xavier University of Louisiana, a predominantly-black, Catholic university in New Orleans that his older siblings had also attended. He initially majored in sociology, but during his second year he auditioned for the university's theater program, and was cast as Gremio in The Taming of the Shrew. Based on this experience, Bagneris decided to follow a stage career, and by his junior year he was writing, directing, and producing plays himself. The Free Southern Theater, which toured in rural, underprivileged areas of the south, performed two of Bagneris's plays while he was an undergraduate.

== Career ==
Bagneris became interested in avant-garde theater methods and, after graduating in 1972, traveled to Amsterdam to learn more about the Bread and Love experimental theater group. He later returned to New Orleans and worked day jobs, while staging experimental scripts he brought back from Europe.

He produced and directed Samuel Beckett's Endgame on a double bill with Eugène Ionesco's The Lesson in a photo gallery, was awarded an artist-in-residence grant by the Arts Council of New Orleans, and began working with an integrated theater company in the French Quarter called Gallery Circle. By 1972, he had won two Best Actor awards in New Orleans.

In 1976, Bagneris saw Will Holt's Me and Bessie, a one-woman show about the blues singer Bessie Smith, in New York City. After seeing the show, he decided to produce a similar show with the City of New Orleans as the main character. He spent a year creating the show, during which he conducted research, developed oral histories, and interviewed his own grandmother. At the same time he was also acting in independent movies and producing and starring in Edward Albee plays.

For six months, Bagneris and his troupe prepared for a one-night-only production of One Mo' Time, a musical he had written based on Black Vaudeville performers in New Orleans. The limited-run show led to performances three nights a week at the Toulouse Theatre in the French Quarter, with James Booker playing piano in the lobby before each show. A New York producer saw the show, leading in October 1979 to One Mo' Time opening at the Village Gate in New York, where it played for three and a half years, spinning several internationally touring companies, including a royal command performance in Britain for Queen Elizabeth II. The show earned a Grammy Award nomination for Best Cast Album in 1980 and was nominated for a Society of West End Theatre Award for Outstanding Achievement in a Musical, Best Musical, and Best Actress in a Musical in 1982. Through One Mo' Time, Bagneris met the dancers Honi Coles and Charles Cook.

Bagneris has cited Pepsi Bethel of the Pepsi Bethel Authentic Jazz Dance Theater as his dance mentor. After they first met, Bethel choreographed every show Bagneris directed.

After the success of One Mo' Time, Bagneris continued his stage career with Staggerlee in 1985; Further Mo', the sequel to One Mo' Time, in 1990; and Cy Coleman's The Life on Broadway in 1998. In 1995, Bagneris received a Lucille Lortel Award for Outstanding Musical, the Drama Desk Award for Outstanding Actor in a Musical and an Obie Award for Jelly Roll!, his two-person stage portrait of jazz pioneer Jelly Roll Morton. A record of the musical was produced and released on GHB Records. Other notable performances included a 2004 revival of Bubbling Brown Sugar, in which Bagneris starred with Diahann Carroll.

During this time, he also worked in film, including French Quarter (1978), Pennies from Heaven (1981), Down by Law (1986), and Ray (2004), in the latter of which he worked as choreographer and played the character Dancin' Al. Bagneris also played opposite Ossie Davis in Davis's last film, the independent feature Proud (2004). One Mo' Time was revived on Broadway in 2002 and again in New Orleans in 2006. Bagneris acted as the voice of numerous jazz figures on Public Radio International's Riverwalk Jazz program in 1993, recreating the lives of Bunk Johnson, Danny Barker, Jelly Roll Morton, and others. In the program for a special performance in the new auditorium at the Library of Congress, Bagneris was described as "a master of the American vernacular."

In October 2005, shortly after the city was significantly damaged by Hurricane Katrina, Bagneris returned to live in New Orleans, settling in the French Quarter.

Bagneris had a recurring role as Judge Bernard Williams on the first three seasons of the HBO series Treme (2010–2013).

== Sources ==
- Bagneris, Vernel, and Leo Touchet. Rejoice When You Die: The New Orleans Jazz Funerals (1998).
- Hay, Samuel A. African American Theatre (1994).
- Woll, Allen L. Black Musical Theatre: From Coontown to 'Dreamgirls (1989).
