= Ralph Falsetta =

American politician (1914–1999)

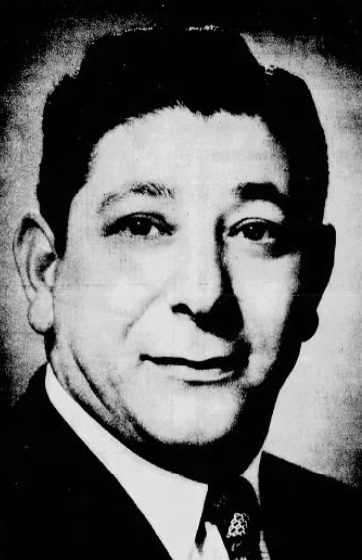
- Falsetta in 1975

Member of the Louisiana State Senate
- In office 1975–1976
- Preceded by: Louis Lambert
- Succeeded by: Joe Sevario

Personal details
- Born: Ralph Joseph Falsetta; August 25, 1914 Donaldsonville, Louisiana, U.S.
- Died: May 13, 1999 (aged 84) Donaldsonville, Louisiana, U.S.
- Party: Democratic

Ralph Joseph Falsetta (August 25, 1914 – May 13, 1999), also known as Big Ralph Falsetta, was an American politician. A member of the Democratic Party, he served in the Louisiana State Senate from 1975 to 1976.

== Life and career ==
Falsetta was born in Donaldsonville, Louisiana, the son of Anthony Falsetta and Rosa Regira. He worked as a businessman.

Falsetta served in the Louisiana State Senate from 1975 to 1976.

== Death ==
Falsetta died on May 13, 1999, in Donaldsonville, Louisiana, at the age of 84.
