= Bagneris =

French and Louisiana Creole surname

- Language: French, Occitan, Gascon, Louisiana Creole

Origin
- Meaning: "Person from the bath/spa"
- Region of origin: France (Occitania & Gascony), Louisiana

Other names
- Variant forms: Bagnerise, Bagneres

Bagneris is a surname of French and Louisiana Creole origin. The name is most commonly associated with families in Louisiana, particularly in New Orleans, where members of the Bagneris family have been active in law, politics, business, and the arts.

== Origins ==
The surname Bagneris is believed to be a toponymic surname derived from southern France. It likely comes from Bagnères, the name of several towns in the Pyrenees such as Bagnères-de-Bigorre and Bagnères-de-Luchon in the region of Occitanie.

The place name itself traces back to Latin balneāria ("baths"), through the regional Gascon/Occitan form Banhèras, referring to spa towns with thermal baths.

The spelling Bagneris appears to be common in Louisiana, with related forms such as Bagnères, Bagneres, Bagnere, Baigneres, and Bagner still attested in France.

== Variants ==
Documented variants of the surname include:

- Bagnerise
- Bagnères
- Bagneres
- Baigneres
- Bagneries
- Bonorice

These reflect regional pronunciations and orthographic differences, especially between French clerical records and Louisiana adaptations.

== Geographic distribution ==
In France, the surname has historic roots in Occitanie, where the towns of Bagnères are located.

In the United States, Bagneris is most closely associated with Louisiana, especially New Orleans and surrounding parishes. Records show members of the Bagneris family present in Louisiana by the early 19th century, including in Opelousas (St. Landry Parish) and Franklin (St. Mary Parish). By the late 19th century, Bagneris families were well established in New Orleans, where they became part of the city’s Creole community and contributed to civic, political, and cultural life.

== Notable people with the surname ==
- John Bagneris, American politician
- Larry Bagneris Jr., American social and political activist
- Vernel Bagneris, American playwright, actor, director, singer, and dancer
- Suzette Bagneris, Esq. & Emile Bagneris III, Esq., American lawyers and entrepreneurs
- Michele B. Bagneris, Esq., American lawyer, City Attorney of Pasadena, California
- Barbara Bagneris, Delta Sigma Theta National 2nd Vice-President under 17th President, Mona Humphries Bailey

== See also ==
- Louisiana Creole people
