= Louisiana's 15th House of Representatives district =

American legislative district

Louisiana's 15th State House of Representatives district
Representative
Foy Gadberry; R–West Monroe

Louisiana's 15th House district is one of 105 Louisiana House of Representatives districts. It is currently represented by Republican Foy Gadberry of West Monroe.

== Geography ==
HD15 includes the cities of Calhoun, Claiborne and parts of West Monroe.

== Election results ==
Year	Opponent	Party	Percent	Candidate	Party	Percent
2011	Frank Hoffmann	Republican	81%	Wayne Trichel	Democratic	19%
2015	Frank Hoffmann	Republican	100%			
2019	Foy Gadberry	Republican	53.2%	Justin Tidwell	Republican	46.8%
2023	Foy Gadberry	Republican	54.5	Randall S. Robinson	Republican	45.5
