= Jon D. Johnson =

American politician (born c. 1948)

Jon D. "Peaches" Johnson (born c. 1948) is an American retired politician from the state of Louisiana. He is the first Black member of the Louisiana Legislature from New Orleans since Reconstruction to serve in both state legislative chambers – the Louisiana House of Representatives and Louisiana State Senate.

Johnson was born around 1948. He graduated from Southern University in Baton Rouge and worked as a teacher and with the Urban League of Louisiana. He founded the New Orleans Ninth Ward Youth Council, and was an assistant director with the Urban League's New Orleans plan. Johnson served in the Louisiana House of Representatives as a Democrat representing Orleans Parish from 1980 to 1985, when he resigned after being elected to the Louisiana Senate to fill a vacancy caused by the death of Nat G. Kiefer. He served in the state senate until 2004.
