= List of Louisiana state legislatures =

The legislature of the U.S. state of Louisiana has convened many times since statehood became effective on April 30, 1812. "The legislature was elected every two years until 1880, when a sitting legislature was elected every four years thereafter."

== Legislatures ==
Name	Start date	End date	Last election
Louisiana State Constitution of 1812
1st Louisiana Legislature	July 1812	1814	1812
2nd Louisiana Legislature	November 1814	1816	1814
3rd Louisiana Legislature	November 1817	1818	1816
4th Louisiana Legislature	January 1819	1820	1820
5th Louisiana Legislature	November 1821	1822	1822
6th Louisiana Legislature	January 1823	1824	1824
7th Louisiana Legislature	November 1824	1826	1826
8th Louisiana Legislature	January 1827	1828	1828
9th Louisiana Legislature	December 1828	1830	1830
10th Louisiana Legislature	January 1831	1832	1832
11th Louisiana Legislature	January 1833	1834	1834
12th Louisiana Legislature	January 1835	1836	1836
13th Louisiana Legislature	January 1837	1838	1838
14th Louisiana Legislature	January 1839	1840	1840
15th Louisiana Legislature	January 1841	1842	1842
16th Louisiana Legislature	January 1843	1844	1844
17th Louisiana Legislature	January 1845	1845	1845
Louisiana State Constitution of 1845
18th Louisiana Legislature	February 1846	1847	1847
19th Louisiana Legislature	January 1848	1848	1848
20th Louisiana Legislature	January 1850	1850	1850
21st Louisiana Legislature	January 1852	1852	1852
Louisiana State Constitution of 1852
22nd Louisiana Legislature	January 1853	1853	1853
23rd Louisiana Legislature	January 1854	1855	1855
24th Louisiana Legislature	January 1856	1857	1857
25th Louisiana Legislature	January 1858	1859	1859
26th Louisiana Legislature	January 1860	1861	1861
27th Louisiana Legislature	November 1861	1863	1863
28th Louisiana Legislature	January 1864	1865	1865
Louisiana State Constitution of 1864
29th Louisiana Legislature	October 1864	1865	1865
30th Louisiana Legislature	January 1866	1867	1867
Louisiana State Constitution of 1868
31st Louisiana Legislature	June 1868	1870	1870
32nd Louisiana Legislature	January 1871	1872	1872
33rd Louisiana Legislature	January 1873	1874	1874
34th Louisiana Legislature	January 1875	1876	1876
35th Louisiana Legislature	January 1877	1878	1878
36th Louisiana Legislature	January 1879	1879	1879
Louisiana State Constitution of 1879
37th Louisiana Legislature	January 1880	1883	1883
38th Louisiana Legislature	May 1884	1886	1886
39th Louisiana Legislature	May 1888	1890	1890
40th Louisiana Legislature	May 1892	1895	1895
41st Louisiana Legislature	May 1896	1899	1900
Louisiana State Constitution of 1898
42nd Louisiana Legislature	May 1900	1904	1904
43rd Louisiana Legislature	May 1904	1908	1908
44th Louisiana Legislature	May 1908	1912	1912
45th Louisiana Legislature	May 1912	1916	1916
Louisiana State Constitution of 1913
46th Louisiana Legislature	May 1916	1920	1920
47th Louisiana Legislature	May 1920	1924	1924
Louisiana State Constitution of 1921
48th Louisiana Legislature	May 1924	1928	1928
49th Louisiana Legislature	May 1928	1932	1932
50th Louisiana Legislature	May 1932	1936	1936
51st Louisiana Legislature	May 1936	1940	1940
52nd Louisiana Legislature	January 1940	1944	1944
53rd Louisiana Legislature	May 1944	1948	1948
54th Louisiana Legislature	May 1948	1952	1952
55th Louisiana Legislature	May 1952	1956	1956
56th Louisiana Legislature	May 1956	1960	
57th Louisiana Legislature	May 1960	1964	1964
58th Louisiana Legislature	May 1964	1968	1968
59th Louisiana Legislature	May 1968	1972	1972
60th Louisiana Legislature	May 1972	1976	1976
Louisiana State Constitution of 1974
61st Louisiana Legislature	May 1976	1980	1980
62nd Louisiana Legislature	April 1980	1984	1984
63rd Louisiana Legislature	March 1984		November 1983
64th Louisiana Legislature	March 1988	1992	November 1987
65th Louisiana Legislature	January 1992	1996	November 1991
66th Louisiana Legislature	January 1996	2000	November 1995
67th Louisiana Legislature	January 2000	2004	November 1999
68th Louisiana Legislature	January 2004	2008	November 2003
69th Louisiana Legislature	January 2008	2012	November 2007
70th Louisiana Legislature	January 2012	2016	November 19, 2011
71st Louisiana Legislature	January 11, 2016	2020	November 21, 2015
72nd Louisiana Legislature	January 13, 2020	2024	November 16, 2019
73rd Louisiana Legislature	January 2024	2028	November 18, 2023

== See also ==
- List of speakers of the Louisiana House of Representatives
- List of presidents of the Louisiana State Senate
- List of governors of Louisiana
- Constitution of Louisiana
- Historical outline of Louisiana
- Lists of United States state legislative sessions
