= Gueydan, Louisiana =

- Town
- Town of Gueydan
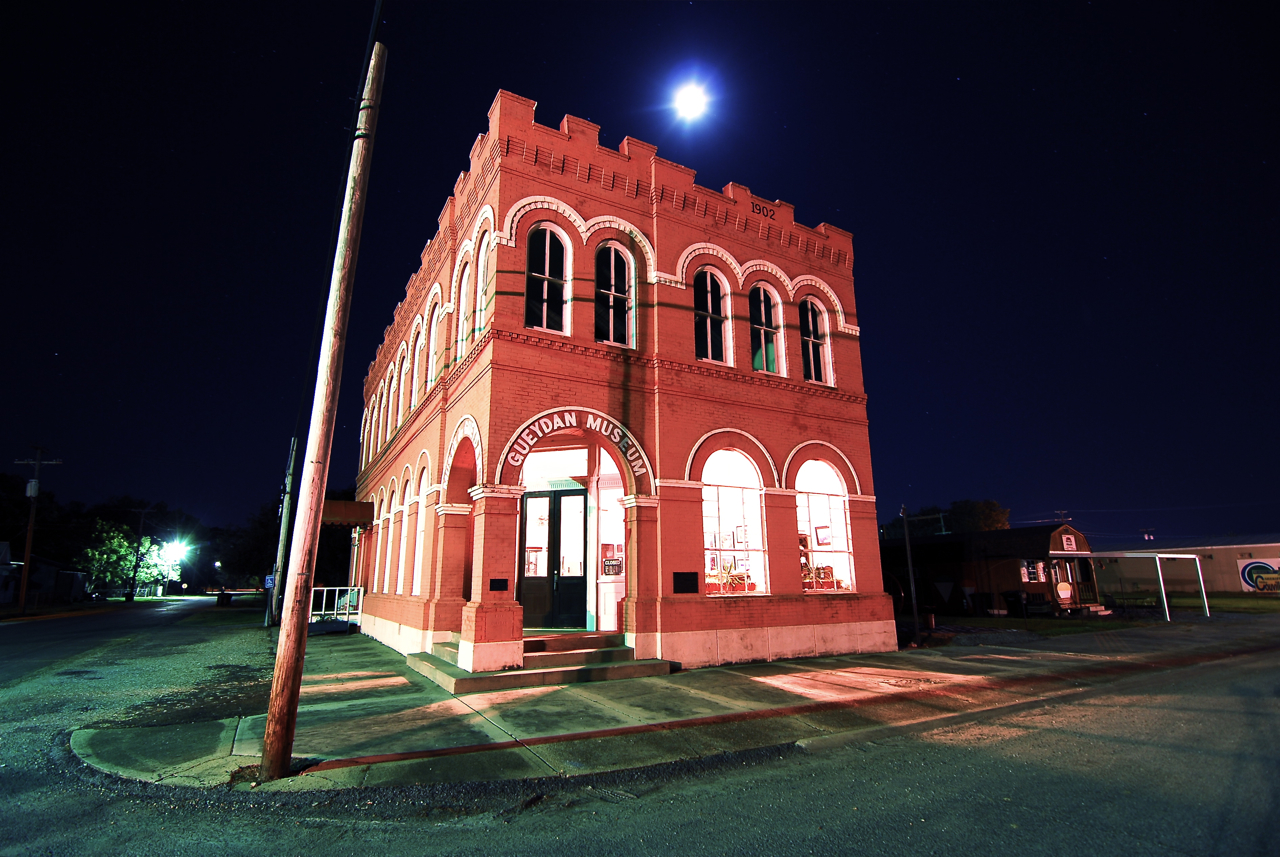
- Motto: "Duck Capital of America"
- Location of Gueydan in Vermilion Parish, Louisiana.

- Location of Louisiana in the United States
- Coordinates: 30°01′41″N 92°30′15″W
- Country: United States
- State: Louisiana
- Parish: Vermilion

Area
  - Total: 0.91 sq mi (2.36 km^{2})
  - Land: 0.91 sq mi (2.36 km^{2})
  - Water: 0 sq mi (0.00 km^{2})
- Elevation: 7 ft (2.1 m)

Population (2020)
  - Total: 1,165
  - Density: 1,279.6/sq mi (494.07/km^{2})
- Time zone: UTC-6 (CST)
  - Summer (DST): UTC-5 (CDT)
- Area code: 337
- FIPS code: 22-32055
- GNIS feature ID: 2406625
- Website: The Town of Gueydan, Louisiana

Gueydan (local pronunciation [ge(ɪ)dɔ̃]) is a town in Vermilion Parish, Louisiana, United States. The population was 1,398 at the 2010 census, down from 1,598 in 2000. At the 2020 population estimates program, its population decreased to 1,328. It is part of the Abbeville micropolitan statistical area.

== History ==
Jean Pierre Gueydan

For thousands of years, indigenous peoples lived along the waterways of Louisiana. They were able to hunt plentiful game and harvest fish from the rivers. In historic times, this area was inhabited by the Attakapa and Chitimacha.

In the early 1860s, Jean Pierre Gueydan, (originally spelled "Guédon") the founder of the European-American town, lived in Abbeville, Louisiana, about 30 miles east of present-day Gueydan. As had the Attapaka and earlier American Indian tribes, he often came to this area to hunt deer, ducks, geese, pheasant, cache-cache (jack snipe), papabottes, and other game. The area was a hunter's paradise.

In 1884, the brothers Jean-Pierre and François Gueydan purchased forty thousand acres (160 km^{2}) of land described by surveyors as "sea marsh, unfit for cultivation", for twelve and one-half cents per acre. By 1896, a small portion of their purchase became known as the "Gueydan Pasture". It was chartered as a village when the population reached 250. Jean Pierre was considered the official founder of Gueydan, as by then he had purchased his brother's landholdings. In 1902, the settlement became the town of Gueydan. Many residents were involved in the cultivation of rice along the waterways, as the area's most important commodity crop.

Realizing the importance of a railroad to the rice farmers, Gueydan donated a section of land and extensive right-of-way to induce the Southern Pacific Railroad to build a branch line from Midland, Louisiana. Shortly after, he offered the first property lots for sale. Settlers began to arrive from other parts of the state and the rest of the country.

The first irrigation pump in the state of Louisiana was built nearby at Primeaux Landing. This enabled water to be pumped to irrigate thousands of acres of rice. With the pump, the area grew as a producer of rice. In the late 19th century, farmers recruited Italian immigrants as laborers, but they quickly left the role of farm workers. Some established local businesses, such as groceries, barber shops and tailors, in small towns across Louisiana.

The founder Jean Pierre Gueydan lived at his plantation, St. Bennette, about two miles south of the community. In 1894 the plantation house was used to house the town's first school, which opened with 10 students.

The town of Gueydan suffered numerous near catastrophes. Fires in 1901, 1903, 1910, and 1927 caused extensive damage. The worst tragedy was the Flood of 1940. After near-record rainfalls in August 1940, the entire town was inundated. Locals still vividly recall the disaster. The area had extensive flooding because it is nearly flat prairie, with an average elevation of only nine feet above the Gulf of Mexico. The elevation tends to be in the range of 5 to 12 feet.

The whole area was once low marshy land, now called wetlands, subject to overflow by the waters of the nearby Mermentau River. This area was filled with trees and bushes that thrived in those conditions and could absorb much water during times of seasonal flooding. Developers created a modern system of canals for drainage purposes and irrigation as early as 1901, but these interfered with the natural processes of the wetlands. Development of the town and rice culture further reduced the natural capacity of the wetlands to absorb flooding, as well as creating a built-up area of residences and businesses where flooding was a threat.

== Geography ==
According to the United States Census Bureau, the town has a total area of 0.9 square miles (2.3 km^{2}), all land.

=== Climate ===
The climate in this area is characterized by hot, humid summers and generally mild to cool winters. According to the Köppen Climate Classification system, Gueydan has a humid subtropical climate, abbreviated "Cfa" on climate maps.

== Demographics ==
Historical population
Census	Pop.	Note	%±
1900	376		—
1910	1,081		187.5%
1920	1,233		14.1%
1930	1,313		6.5%
1940	1,506		14.7%
1950	2,041		35.5%
1960	2,156		5.6%
1970	1,984		−8.0%
1980	1,695		−14.6%
1990	1,611		−5.0%
2000	1,598		−0.8%
2010	1,398		−12.5%
2020	1,165		−16.7%
2025 (est.)	1,122	▼	−3.7%
U.S. Decennial Census

Gueydan racial composition as of 2020
Race	Number	Percentage
White (non-Hispanic)	965	82.83%
Black or African American (non-Hispanic)	157	13.48%
Other/Mixed	20	1.72%
Hispanic or Latino	23	1.97%

At the 2020 United States census, there were 1,165 people, 518 households, and 333 families residing in the town. At the 2000 U.S. census, there were 1,598 people, 644 households, and 416 families residing in the town. The population density was 1,874.9 inhabitants per square mile (723.9/km^{2}). There were 724 housing units at an average density of 849.5 per square mile (328.0/km^{2}). The racial makeup of the town was 86.61% White, 12.83% African American, 0.13% Native American, 0.31% from other races, and 0.13% from two or more races. Hispanic or Latino of any race were 1.25% of the population.

There were 644 households, out of which 31.2% had children under the age of 18 living with them, 46.3% were married couples living together, 15.1% had a female householder with no husband present, and 35.4% were non-families. 31.1% of all households were made up of individuals, and 15.5% had someone living alone who was 65 years of age or older. The average household size was 2.38 and the average family size was 2.99.

In the town, the population was spread out, with 25.0% under the age of 18, 10.0% from 18 to 24, 23.5% from 25 to 44, 20.7% from 45 to 64, and 20.8% who were 65 years of age or older. The median age was 39 years. For every 100 females, there were 82.6 males. For every 100 females age 18 and over, there were 76.4 males.

The median income for a household in the town was $22,165, and the median income for a family was $32,039. Males had a median income of $25,682 versus $13,500 for females. The per capita income for the town was $13,738. About 16.1% of families and 21.0% of the population were below the poverty line, including 26.6% of those under age 18 and 21.9% of those age 65 or over.

== Arts and culture ==
=== Duck festival ===
The town is the site of the annual Duck Festival, which is held the weekend before Labor Day. It is officially recognized as the Duck Capital of America. The Louisiana state championships for duck and goose calling are held in conjunction with the festival.

== Notable people ==
- Nathan Abshire, Cajun accordion player, was born in the area between Gueydan and Bayou Queue de Tortue.
- Iron Eyes Cody (Espera de Corti) actor who grew up here.
- Bob Hensgens, former mayor of Gueydan and state representative
- Jeannette Knoll, associate justice of the Louisiana Supreme Court
- Frank Glasgow Tinker, American volunteer fighter pilot during the Spanish Civil War.
