= John Bagneris =

American politician

Member of the Louisiana House of Representatives from the 100th district
- In office January 2016 – January 2020
- Preceded by: Austin Badon
- Succeeded by: Jason Hughes

Personal details
- Party: Democratic
- Relatives: Larry Bagneris Jr. (Cousin); Vernel Bagneris (Cousin)
- Education: Southern University at New Orleans
- Occupation: Transportation manager

John H. Bagneris is an American politician from New Orleans, Louisiana, who represented District 100 in the Louisiana House of Representatives from 2016 until 2020. A Democrat, Bagneris sought election to District 3 in the Louisiana State Senate in 2019, but lost to fellow Democrat Joseph Bouie Jr.

== Biography ==
Bagneris first entered politics as a campaign and legislative aide to Louis Charbonnet, who represented District 96 in the Louisiana House of Representatives between 1970 and 1984. He worked for other campaigns and politicians throughout the 1980s and 1990s.

== Electoral history ==
In 2015, Bagneris ran for District 100 in the Louisiana House of Representatives to succeed term-limited incumbent Austin Badon. He advanced from the first round of voting with 37% of the vote, and defeated fellow Democrat Alicia Pliven Clivers with 55% of the vote in the runoff.

In 2019, Bagneris announced he would run to succeed term-limited Democratic Senator Jean-Paul Morrell for District 3 in the Louisiana State Senate. He lost to fellow Democratic State Representative Joseph Bouie Jr. in the runoff election.
