= Wesley T. Bishop =

American politician

Member of the Louisiana State Senate for District 4
- In office 2016–2020
- Succeeded by: Jimmy Harris

Member of the Louisiana House of Representatives for District 99
- In office 2011–2016

Personal details
- Party: Democratic
- Education: Southern University (BS); Ohio State University (JD); University of Mississippi (MPA)

Wesley T. Bishop is an American politician who served in the Louisiana House of Representatives and the Louisiana State Senate. Bishop endorsed the Hillary Clinton 2016 presidential campaign. In 2019, he was charged by the United States District Court for the Eastern District of Louisiana with making a false statement.
