= Mickey Guillory =

American politician (1940–2026)

Member of the Louisiana House of Representatives
- In office 2003–2016

Personal details
- Born: Mickey James Guillory; February 29, 1940
- Died: August 3, 2026 (aged 86) Eunice, Louisiana, U.S.
- Party: Democratic
- Spouse: Helen Aucoin (died. 2024)
- Education: Louisiana State University at Eunice; Louisiana State University

Mickey James Guillory (February 29, 1940 – August 3, 2026) was an American politician. A member of the Democratic Party, he served in the Louisiana House of Representatives from 2003 to 2016.

== Early life and career ==
Guillory was born on February 29, 1940, the son of Winnie Guillory and Priscilla Saucier. He attended Louisiana State University at Eunice and Louisiana State University in Baton Rouge, Louisiana. He graduated from Louisiana Police Academy, and worked as a state trooper with the Louisiana State Police.

He served in the Louisiana House of Representatives from 2003 to 2016. During his service in the House, in 2013, he co-sponsored lifetime concealed carry gun permits.

== Personal life and death ==
Guillory was married to Helen Aucoin. Their marriage lasted until her death in 2024.

Guillory died in Eunice, Louisiana, on August 3, 2026, at the age of 86.
