= Louisiana's 99th House of Representatives district =

American legislative district

Louisiana's 99th State House of Representatives district
Representative
Candace Newell; D–New Orleans

Louisiana's 99th House of Representatives district is one of 105 Louisiana House of Representatives districts. It is currently held by Democrat Candace Newell.

== Geography ==
HD99 is located entirely inside of the city of New Orleans.

== Election results ==
Year	Winning candidate	Party	Percent	Opponent	Party	Percent
2011	Wesley Bishop	Democratic	81.6%	Samuel Cowart	Democratic	18.4%
2015	Jimmy Harris	Democratic	61.3%	Ray Crawford	Democratic	38.7%
2019	Candace Newell	Democratic	54.6%	Adonis Expose	Democratic	45.5%
2023	Candace Newell	Democratic	Cancelled			
