= Greg Barro =

American politician

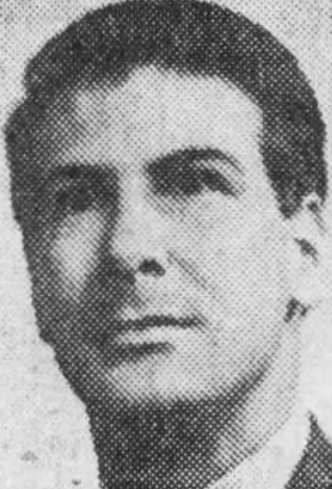
- Barro in 1988

Member of the Louisiana State Senate from the 37th district
- In office 1992–1996
- Preceded by: Sydney B. Nelson
- Succeeded by: Max T. Malone

Personal details
- Born: Gregory John Barro Jr. March 27, 1957 (age 69) Shreveport, Louisiana, U.S.
- Party: Democratic
- Spouse: Karin Hughes Adams (m. 1987)

Gregory John Barro Jr. (born March 27, 1957) is an American politician. A member of the Democratic Party, he served in the Louisiana State Senate from 1992 to 1996.

== Life and career ==
Barro was born in Shreveport, Louisiana, the son of Albert Barro and Frances Sadie. He attended and graduated from Captain Shreve High School. After graduating, he attended Louisiana State University, earning his BS degree and his J.D. degree, which after earning his degrees, he worked as an attorney.

Barro served in the Louisiana State Senate from 1992 to 1996.
