= Candace Newell =

American politician from Louisiana

Member of the Louisiana House of Representatives from the 99th district
- Incumbent
- Assumed office January 13, 2020
- Preceded by: Jimmy Harris

Personal details
- Party: Democratic
- Education: Southern University (BS, MS, JD)

Candace N. Newell is an American politician and attorney serving as a member of the Louisiana House of Representatives from the 99th district. She assumed office on January 13, 2020, succeeding Jimmy Harris.

== Background ==
Newell earned a Bachelor of Science degree in psychology, Master of Science in criminology, and Juris Doctor from Southern University at New Orleans. Newell previously served as a legislative aide for Wesley Bishop and as an intern for the Louisiana Legislative Black Caucus.
