= Ronald Clarence Bean =

American politician

Ronald Clarence Bean (November 4, 1936 – 19 April 2005) was an American politician who served as President pro tempore of the Louisiana State Senate. He was a Republican.

He served in the military, and was a helicopter pilot. He survived a helicopter crash in 1973. Carol Grady Bean was his wife.

He lived in Shreveport. He represented District 38. His funeral was held April 22, 2005.
