= Louisiana's 4th State Senate district =

American legislative district

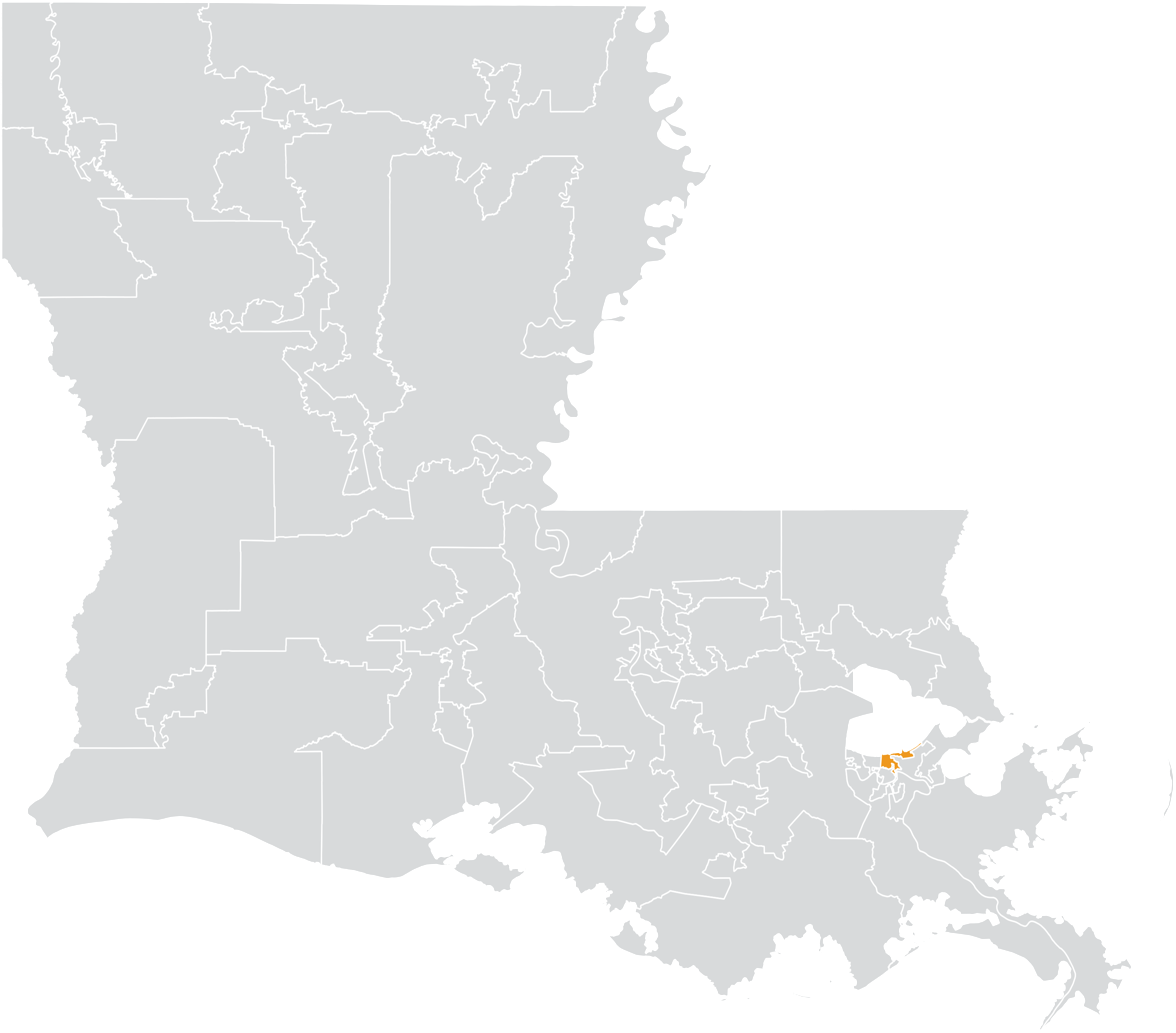
Senator
Jimmy Harris; D–New Orleans
- Registration: 64.1% Democratic; 11.3% Republican; 24.6% No party preference
- Demographics: 30% White; 62% Black; 4% Hispanic; 1% Asian; 2% Other
- Population (2019): 126,834
- Registered voters: 88,194

Louisiana's 4th State Senate district is one of 39 districts in the Louisiana State Senate. It has been represented by Democrat Jimmy Harris since 2020, succeeding retiring fellow Democrat Wesley Bishop.

== Geography ==
District 4 is located entirely within New Orleans, including parts of Mid-City, Lakeview, Gentilly, the French Quarter, Tremé, and New Orleans East.

The district overlaps with Louisiana's 1st and 2nd congressional districts, and with the 93rd, 94th, 97th, 99th, and 100th districts of the Louisiana House of Representatives.

== Recent election results ==
Louisiana uses a jungle primary system. If no candidate receives 50% in the first round of voting, when all candidates appear on the same ballot regardless of party, the top-two finishers advance to a runoff election.

=== 2019 ===
2019 Louisiana State Senate election, District 4
Party	Candidate	Votes	%
Democratic	Jimmy Harris	Unopposed	100
Total votes		Unopposed	100
Democratic hold			

=== 2015 ===
2015 Louisiana State Senate election, District 4
Party	Candidate	Votes	%
Democratic	Wesley Bishop	16,336	64.8
Democratic	R. Erich Caulfield	6,195	24.6
Democratic	Joe Swider	2,665	10.6
Total votes		25,196	100
Democratic hold			

=== 2011 ===
2011 Louisiana State Senate election, District 4
Party	Candidate	Votes	%
Democratic	Edwin Murray (incumbent)	Unopposed	100
Total votes		Unopposed	100
Democratic hold			

=== Federal and statewide results ===
Year	Office	Results
2020	President	Biden 81.1–17.1%
2019	Governor (runoff)	Edwards 88.5–11.5%
2016	President	Clinton 79.1–16.3%
2015	Governor (runoff)	Edwards 85.5–14.5%
2014	Senate (runoff)	Landrieu 83.8–16.2%
2012	President	Obama 79.3–18.9%
