= Joe Sevario =

American politician

Member of the Louisiana State Senate from the 18th district
- In office 1976–1994
- Preceded by: Ralph Falsetta
- Succeeded by: Louis Lambert

Personal details
- Born: Joseph Adam Sevario III; September 18, 1944 (age 81)
- Party: Democratic
- Spouse: Bobbie Sevario

Joseph Adam Sevario III (born September 18, 1944) is an American politician. He served as a Democratic member for the 18th district of the Louisiana State Senate.

Sevario was the son of Joseph Adam Sevario Jr. and Audrey Cannon. He had two brothers and three sisters. In 1976, Sevario was elected for the 18th district of the Louisiana State Senate, serving until 1994. In 1986 he was a candidate for the 8th congressional district of Louisiana of the United States House of Representatives, but was not elected.

Louisiana Highway 932 has been named Joe Sevario Road.
