= Louisiana Office of Alcohol and Tobacco Control =

Office of Alcohol and Tobacco Control
State agency overview
- Type: Regulatory agency
- Jurisdiction: Louisiana
- Status: Active
- Commissioner responsible: Chad Brown
- Parent State agency: Louisiana State Government

The Office of Alcohol and Tobacco Control is a Louisiana state government agency that regulates the alcoholic beverage and tobacco industries. The Office promotes the prevention of underage access to alcohol and tobacco as well as responsible business practices.

The former Commissioner of the Office of Alcohol and Tobacco Control was Ernest P. Legier Jr. who was appointed by Governor John Bel Edwards. He resigned in August 2025 and was replaced by Chad Brown on November 18, 2025.
