= Louisiana's 26th State Senate district =

American legislative district

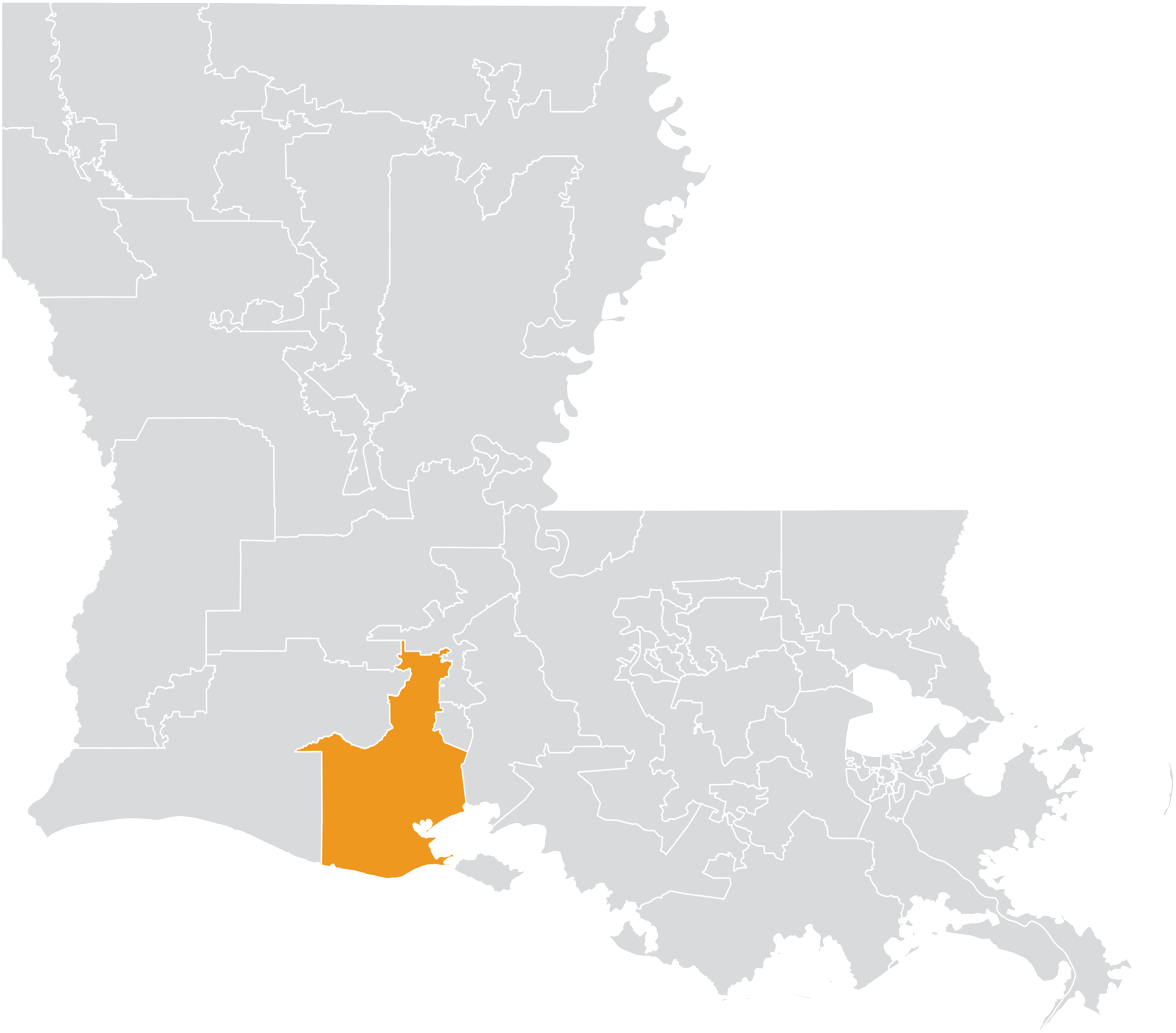
Senator
| Bob Hensgens; R–Gueydan |
- Registration: 39.8% Democratic; 32.4% Republican; 27.8% No party preference
- Demographics: 74% White; 18% Black; 5% Hispanic; 1% Asian; 2% Other
- Population (2019): 128,286
- Registered voters: 77,280

Louisiana's 26th State Senate district is one of 39 districts in the Louisiana State Senate. It has been represented by Republican Bob Hensgens since a 2018 special election to succeed fellow Republican Jonathan Perry.

== Geography ==
District 26 covers all of Vermilion Parish and parts of Acadia, Lafayette, and St. Landry Parishes in Acadiana, including some or all of Abbeville, Kaplan, Erath, Scott, Rayne, Church Point, and Sunset.

The district overlaps with Louisiana's 3rd and 4th congressional districts, and with the 31st, 39th, 40th, 41st, 42nd, 45th, 47th, and 49th districts of the Louisiana House of Representatives.

== Recent election results ==
Louisiana uses a jungle primary system. If no candidate receives 50% in the first round of voting, when all candidates appear on the same ballot regardless of party, the top-two finishers advance to a runoff election.

=== 2019 ===
2019 Louisiana State Senate election, District 26
| Party | Candidate | Votes | % |
|---|---|---|---|
| Republican | Bob Hensgens (incumbent) | 27,228 | 79.2 |
| Democratic | Jerry Gaspard | 7,161 | 20.8 |
| Total votes | | 34,389 | 100 |
| Republican hold | | | |

=== 2018 special ===
2018 Louisiana State Senate special election, District 26
| Party | Candidate | Votes | % |
|---|---|---|---|
| Republican | Bob Hensgens | 22,361 | 60.0 |
| Democratic | Jean Menard | 8,158 | 21.9 |
| Republican | Jerry Gaspard | 6,777 | 18.2 |
| Total votes | | 37,296 | 100 |
| Republican hold | | | |

=== 2015 ===
2015 Louisiana State Senate election, District 26
| Party | Candidate | Votes | % |
|---|---|---|---|
| Republican | Jonathan Perry (incumbent) | Unopposed | 100 |
| Total votes | | Unopposed | 100 |
| Republican hold | | | |

=== 2011 ===
2011 Louisiana State Senate election, District 26
| Party | Candidate | Votes | % |
|---|---|---|---|
| Republican | Jonathan Perry (incumbent) | Unopposed | 100 |
| Total votes | | Unopposed | 100 |
| Republican hold | | | |

=== Federal and statewide results ===
| Year | Office | Results |
|---|---|---|
| 2020 | President | Trump 76.5–22.1% |
| 2019 | Governor (runoff) | Rispone 71.1–28.9% |
| 2016 | President | Trump 75.6–21.6% |
| 2015 | Governor (runoff) | Vitter 57.3–42.7% |
| 2014 | Senate (runoff) | Cassidy 73.0–27.0% |
| 2012 | President | Romney 73.5–25.0% |
