= Jimmy Harris (politician) =

American politician

Member of the Louisiana State Senate from the 4th district
- Incumbent
- Assumed office January 13, 2020
- Preceded by: Wesley Bishop

Member of the Louisiana House of Representatives from the 99th district
- In office January 2016 – January 13, 2020
- Preceded by: Wesley Bishop
- Succeeded by: Candace Newell

Personal details
- Born: 1973 or 1974 (age 51–52)
- Party: Democratic
- Education: Morehouse College (BA); Southern University (JD)
- Occupation: Lawyer

James Harris III is an American politician from New Orleans, Louisiana. A Democrat, Harris has represented District 4 in the Louisiana State Senate since 2020; he previously represented District 99 in the Louisiana House of Representatives between 2016 and 2020.

== Career ==
Before entering elected office, Harris worked as an aide for U.S. Representative Cedric Richmond, as well as working for several other elected officials in the state. With Richmond's backing, he ran in 2015 for District 99 in the Louisiana House of Representatives. Harris defeated Markeita Prevost and Ray Crawford after two rounds of voting.

In 2019, Harris announced that he would run for District 4 in the Louisiana State Senate, which was vacated by Wesley Bishop, Harris' predecessor in the House. Harris was elected with no opponents from either party.

In 2023, Jimmy Harris was re-elected to his position as a member of the Louisiana State Senate, representing District 4. He ran unopposed, securing another term in office.
