= Bob Hensgens =

American politician

Member of the Louisiana Senate from the 26th district
- Incumbent
- Assumed office December 2018
- Preceded by: Jonathan Perry

Member of the Louisiana House of Representatives from the 47th district
- In office April 2011 – December 2018
- Succeeded by: Ryan Bourriaque

Mayor of Gueydan, Louisiana
- In office 2007–2011

Personal details
- Party: Republican
- Education: University of Louisiana at Lafayette (BS)

Bob Hensgens is an American politician serving as a member of the Louisiana State Senate from the 26th district. Elected in 2018, he was previously a member of the Louisiana House of Representatives from 2011 to 2018.

== Education ==
Hensgens attended Vermilion Catholic High School and earned a Bachelor of Science degree in business administration from the University of Louisiana at Lafayette.

== Career ==
Since 2009, Hensgens has worked as an administrator at the Gueydan Memorial Guest Home in Gueydan, Louisiana. He also served as the major of Gueydan from 2007 to 2011. Hensgens represented the 47th district in the Louisiana House of Representatives from April 2011 to December 2018. He was then elected to the Louisiana State Senate in a December 2018 special election. From 2012 to 2015, Hensgens served as vice chair of the House Agriculture, Forestry, Aquaculture and Rural Development Committee. During the 2019–2020 legislative session, he served as vice chair of the House Judiciary Committee. Since 2021, he has served as chair of the House Natural Resources Committee.
