= Claiborne, Louisiana =

Claiborne
- Census-designated place
- Location of Claiborne in Ouachita Parish, Louisiana.

- Location of Claiborne in Louisiana
- Coordinates: 32°32′16″N 92°11′53″W
- Country: United States
- State: Louisiana
- Parish: Ouachita

Area
  - Total: 9.99 sq mi (25.88 km^{2})
  - Land: 9.96 sq mi (25.79 km^{2})
  - Water: 0.035 sq mi (0.09 km^{2})
- Elevation: 157 ft (48 m)

Population (2020)
  - Total: 12,631
  - Density: 1,268.5/sq mi (489.78/km^{2})
- Time zone: UTC-6 (CST)
  - Summer (DST): UTC-5 (CDT)
- Area code: 318
- FIPS code: 22-15605
- GNIS feature ID: 2402779

Claiborne is an unincorporated community and census-designated place (CDP) in Ouachita Parish, Louisiana, United States. As of the 2020 census, Claiborne had a population of 12,631. It is part of the Monroe Metropolitan Statistical Area.

== Geography ==
According to the United States Census Bureau, the CDP has a total area of 10.1 square miles (26 km^{2}), of which 10.1 square miles (26 km^{2}) is land and 0.04 square miles (0.10 km^{2}) (0.39%) is water.

== Demographics ==
Historical population
Census	Pop.	Note	%±
1980	6,278		—
1990	8,300		32.2%
2000	9,830		18.4%
2010	11,507		17.1%
2020	12,631		9.8%
U.S. Decennial Census; 1950 1960 1970 1980; 1990 2000 2010

Claiborne first appeared as a census designated place the 1980 U.S. census.

=== 2020 census ===
Claiborne racial composition
Race	Number	Percentage
White (non-Hispanic)	10,378	82.16%
Black or African American (non-Hispanic)	885	7.01%
Native American	52	0.41%
Asian	339	2.68%
Pacific Islander	1	0.01%
Other/Mixed	526	4.16%
Hispanic or Latino	450	3.56%

As of the 2020 census, Claiborne had a population of 12,631. The median age was 35.6 years. 25.4% of residents were under the age of 18 and 15.5% of residents were 65 years of age or older. For every 100 females there were 86.5 males, and for every 100 females age 18 and over there were 83.8 males age 18 and over.

97.5% of residents lived in urban areas, while 2.5% lived in rural areas.

There were 5,110 households in Claiborne, including 2,851 families, of which 35.7% had children under the age of 18 living in them. Of all households, 48.0% were married-couple households, 14.4% were households with a male householder and no spouse or partner present, and 32.2% were households with a female householder and no spouse or partner present. About 26.8% of all households were made up of individuals and 11.7% had someone living alone who was 65 years of age or older.

There were 5,609 housing units, of which 8.9% were vacant. The homeowner vacancy rate was 2.4% and the rental vacancy rate was 12.0%.

=== 2000 census ===
As of the census of 2000, there were 9,830 people, 3,759 households, and 2,823 families residing in the CDP. The population density was 972.3 inhabitants per square mile (375.4/km^{2}). There were 3,925 housing units at an average density of 388.2 per square mile (149.9/km^{2}). The racial makeup of the CDP was 97.04% White, 1.58% African American, 0.13% Native American, 0.31% Asian, 0.01% Pacific Islander, 0.23% from other races, and 0.70% from two or more races. Hispanic or Latino of any race were 1.08% of the population.

There were 3,759 households, out of which 40.2% had children under the age of 18 living with them, 59.3% were married couples living together, 12.4% had a female householder with no husband present, and 24.9% were non-families. 21.8% of all households were made up of individuals, and 8.3% had someone living alone who was 65 years of age or older. The average household size was 2.61 and the average family size was 3.05.

In the CDP, the population was spread out, with 28.4% under the age of 18, 8.9% from 18 to 24, 32.0% from 25 to 44, 20.9% from 45 to 64, and 9.8% who were 65 years of age or older. The median age was 33 years. For every 100 females, there were 88.3 males. For every 100 females age 18 and over, there were 84.4 males.

The median income for a household in the CDP was $45,200, and the median income for a family was $54,041. Males had a median income of $37,000 versus $26,008 for females. The per capita income for the CDP was $20,816. About 6.7% of families and 8.6% of the population were below the poverty line, including 9.7% of those under age 18 and 10.4% of those age 65 or over.

== Education ==
Ouachita Parish School System is the area school district.

Claiborne Elementary School covers much of the CDP, while parts of the CDP to the east are zoned to Highland Elementary. Both Claiborne and Highland elementaries feed into West Ridge Middle School and West Monroe High School.
