= Dana Henry =

American politician

Member of the Louisiana House of Representatives from the 100th district
- Incumbent
- Assumed office March 24, 2026
- Preceded by: Jason Hughes

Personal details
- Party: Democratic
- Website: www.danahenry100.com

Dana Henry is an American politician who is a member of the Louisiana House of Representatives for the 100th district since a 2026 special election.
