= Chasity Martinez =

American politician

Member of the Louisiana House of Representatives from the 60th district
- Incumbent
- Assumed office February 25, 2026
- Preceded by: Chad Brown

Personal details
- Party: Democratic

Chasity Verret Martinez is an American politician from Louisiana. A member of the Democratic Party, she is a member to the Louisiana House of Representatives.

== Career ==
Martinez was elected to the Iberville Parish Council in October 2023, defeating incumbent Louis “Pete” Kelley. She ran in the 2026 special election for the 60th district of the Louisiana House of Representatives, which Chad Brown had represented. She defeated Republican Party nominee Brad Daigle, the president of the Iberville Parish Council, in the general election.
