= Ron Landry =

American lawyer and politician (1943–2020)

Ronald Jude Landry (May 30, 1943 – May 24, 2020) was an American lawyer and politician.

Landry was born in Lutcher, Louisiana and lived in Thibodaux, Louisiana. He went to Nicholls State University. He received his bachelor's and law degrees from Louisiana State University. Landry practiced law in LaPlace, Louisiana. Landry served in the Louisiana Senate from 1976 until 2000 and was a Democrat. He died in Mandeville, Louisiana.
