= Wilford Carter =

American politician

Wilford Carter Sr.

Member of the Louisiana House of Representatives from the 34th district
- Incumbent
- Assumed office January 13, 2020
- Preceded by: Albert Franklin

Personal details
- Party: Democratic
- Education: McNeese State University; Southern University Law Center (JD)

Wilford Dan Carter Sr. is an American politician serving as a member of the Louisiana House of Representatives from the 34th district, representing Calcasieu Parish. He assumed office on January 10, 2020.

== Career ==
Carter was a judge of the 14th Judicial District (Division F) in Calcasieu Parish for 21 years. He was first elected to this position on October 3, 1992, and took office in 1993. He then retired on November 1, 2013.

On October 12, 2019, Carter and Kevin Guidry advanced to a runoff for the District 34 seat, defeating Matilda Green Miller. He went on to win election, receiving 57.2% of the vote over Guidry's 42.8%. Carter, won re-election to the Louisiana House of Representatives outright in the primary on October 14, 2023, with 62% of the vote, again defeating Guidry.
