= Phillip DeVillier =

American politician (born 1976)

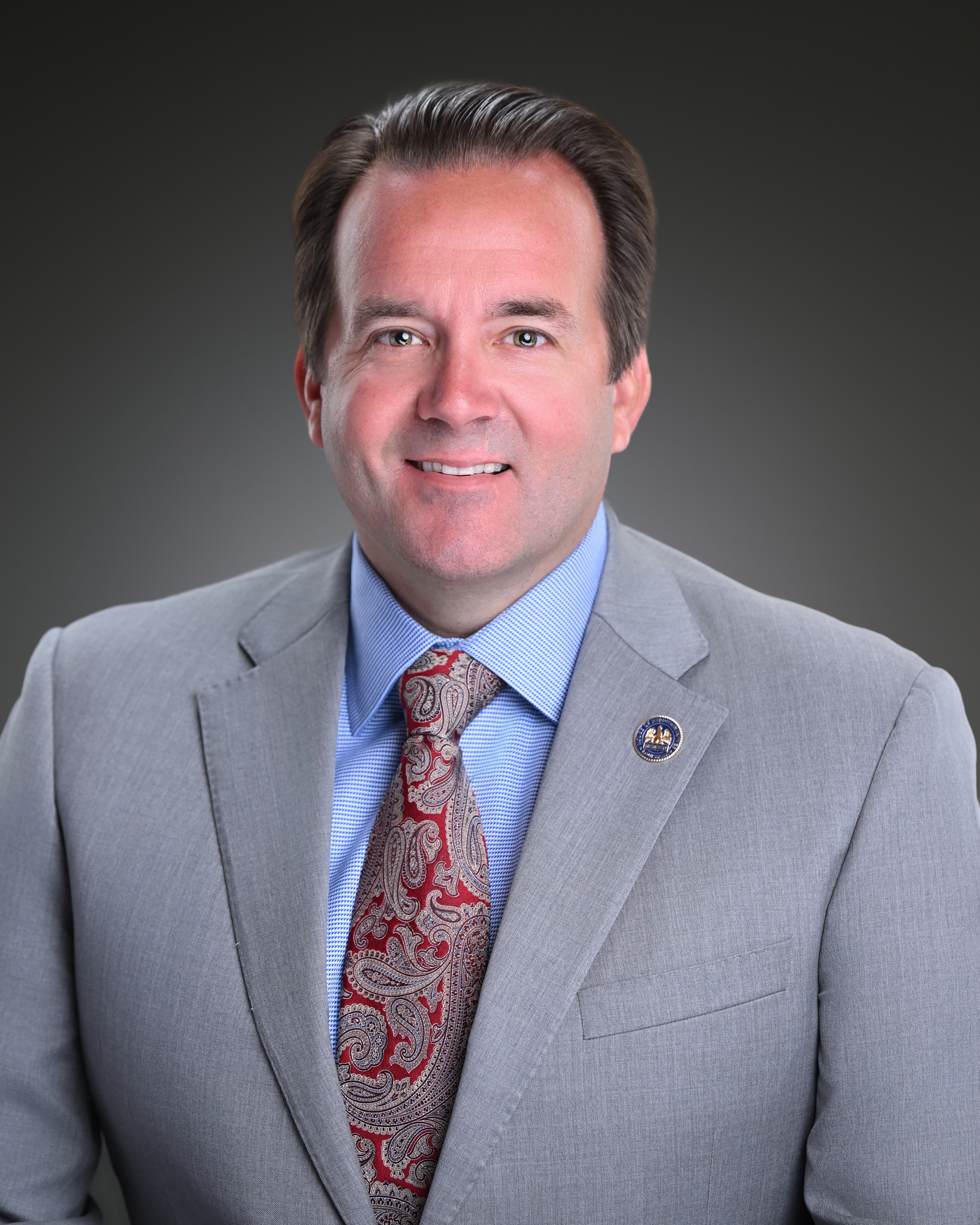
- Official portrait, 2024

Speaker of the Louisiana House of Representatives
- Incumbent
- Assumed office January 8, 2024
- Preceded by: Clay Schexnayder

Member of the Louisiana House of Representatives from the 41st district
- Incumbent
- Assumed office January 11, 2016
- Preceded by: Mickey Guillory

Personal details
- Born: Phillip Ryan DeVillier; June 8, 1976 (age 49)
- Party: Republican
- Children: 3
- Education: Louisiana State University (BS)

Phillip Ryan DeVillier (born June 8, 1976) is a Republican member of the Louisiana House of Representatives for District 41 in Acadia, Evangeline, and St. Landry parishes in south Louisiana and also currently serving as Speaker of the Louisiana House of Representatives. On January 11, 2016, DeVillier succeeded term-limited Democratic Representative Mickey Guillory.

In the October 24, 2015 primary election, DeVillier led a three-candidate field with 6,308 votes (55.8 percent). He defeated another Republican, former Representative Gregory L. Fruge, who polled 3,036 votes (26.9 percent), and Democrat Germaine Simpson, who finished with 1,956 votes (17.3 percent).

DeVillier was brought up in Eunice, Louisiana. He owns DeVillier House Movers in St. Landry Parish. He and his wife have three children.

Political offices
| Preceded by Clay Schexnayder | Speaker of the Louisiana House of Representatives; 2024–present | Incumbent |
