= Jason Hughes (politician) =

American politician

Member of the New Orleans City Council from District E
- Incumbent
- Assumed office January 12, 2026
- Preceded by: Oliver Thomas

Member of the Louisiana House of Representatives from the 100th district
- In office January 13, 2020 – December 14, 2025
- Preceded by: John Bagneris
- Succeeded by: Dana Henry

Personal details
- Born: New Orleans, Louisiana, U.S.
- Party: Democratic
- Education: Southern University (BA)
- Profession: Political strategist; consultant
- Website: Campaign website

Jason Wynne Hughes is an American politician who is the member of District E of the New Orleans City Council. He is a former member of the Louisiana House of Representatives from the 100th District, serving from 2020 to 2025 and is a member of the Democratic Party.

== Education and career ==
Hughes graduated from McDonogh #35 Senior High School. Hughes then attended Southern University, where he graduated with a bachelor's degree in political science. Hughes was a member of the Kappa Alpha Psi fraternity on campus.

Before becoming a politician himself, Hughes worked as a political strategist in Louisiana politics. Hughes has served as the assistant legislative director to former Louisiana Governor Kathleen Blanco, the regional manager for former US Senator Mary Landrieu, and the Director of Federal Relations for the city of New Orleans.

== Louisiana House of Representatives ==
2015

In 2015, Hughes was a candidate for District 100 in the Louisiana House of Representatives, but he was disqualified from the Democratic primary for failing to file a tax return in 2010.

2019

Hughes ran for the same seat again in 2019 after incumbent John Bagneris decided to run for District 3 in the Louisiana State Senate. In the nonpartisan primary election, Hughes beat opponent Anthony Jackson Jr. with over 66% of the vote. The general election was canceled.

=== Committee assignments ===
- Health and Welfare
- Judiciary
- Ways and Means
- Joint Legislative Committee on Capital Outlay
- House Select Committee on Homeland Security

== Electoral history ==
District 100 - Orleans Parish
Year	Candidate	Votes	Pct	Candidate	Votes	Pct
2019 Primary	Jason Hughes	7,227	66.3%	Anthony Jackson Jr.	3,675	33.7%

Louisiana House of Representatives
Preceded by John Bagneris	Louisiana State Representative for District 100 (Orleans Parish); 2020 – 2025	Succeeded by Dana Henry
