= Paul Sawyer (politician) =

American politician

Member of the Louisiana House of Representatives from the 69th district
- Incumbent
- Assumed office March 24, 2026
- Preceded by: Paula Davis

Personal details
- Party: Republican
- Website: www.paulsawyerforla.com

Paul Sawyer is an American politician who has been a member of the Louisiana House of Representatives for the 69th district since a 2026 special election.
