= Reese Broussard =

American politician

Member of the Louisiana House of Representatives from the 37th district
- Incumbent
- Assumed office February 20, 2026
- Preceded by: Troy Romero

Personal details
- Party: Republican

Reese 'Skip' Broussard is an American politician from Louisiana. A member of the Republican Party, he is a member of the Louisiana House of Representatives.

== Career ==
He ran in the 2026 special election for the 37th district in the Louisiana House of Representatives, which Troy Romero had represented. He defeated Independent Ivy Woods, and Republican Coy Myers, in the general election.
