= Paula Davis =

American politician

Louisiana House of Representatives from the 69th district
- In office January 2016 – January 9, 2026
- Preceded by: Erich Ponti
- Succeeded by: Paul Sawyer

Personal details
- Born: November 25, 1973 (age 52) Breaux Bridge, Louisiana, United States
- Party: Republican
- Spouse: John Davis
- Children: Hayden Davis
- Education: Louisiana State University
- Occupation: Commercial real estate agent

Paula Davis (born November 25, 1973) is a former Republican member of the Louisiana House of Representatives.

== Work in House ==
In 2018, Davis was named 2018 Legislator of the Year by the Southwest Louisiana Chamber of Commerce for her pro-business voting record.

For the 2020-2024 legislative term, Davis was appointed by the Speaker of the House as Chair of the House Commerce Committee. She was also a member of the House Executive Committee, House Select Leadership Committee, Joint Select Committee on Louisiana Economic Recovery, Capital Region Legislative Delegation, Louisiana Legislative Women's Caucus and Louisiana Republican Legislative Delegation. During the prior four-year term, Davis was a member of four legislative committees: Insurance, Joint Legislative Committee on Capital Outlay, Municipal, Parochial, and Cultural Affairs and Ways and Means.

Davis resigned from the Louisiana House on January 9, 2026.

== Personal life ==
Davis is married and has one child. She resides in Baton Rouge. In addition to being a commercial real estate agent with Waters & Pettit, Davis has been an active member within the Baton Rouge non-profit community, serving as 2017 President of the Baton Rouge Symphony League, Co-chair of the 2016 Baton Rouge Symphony League Madhatters fundraiser, and co-chair of the 2015 Manship Theatre's 10th Anniversary fundraiser. Davis currently serves on the board of directors for The ARC of Baton Rouge, the Louisiana Arts and Science Museum, and the LSU Ogden Honors College. She is a member of the Episcopal Church.

Louisiana House of Representatives
Preceded by Erich Ponti	Louisiana State Representative for District 69; 2016 – 2026	Succeeded by Paul Sawyer
