= Chad Brown (politician) =

American politician

Chad Michael Brown

Commissioner of the Louisiana Office of Alcohol and Tobacco Control
- Incumbent
- Assumed office 2026
- Governor: Jeff Landry
- Preceded by: Juana Marine-Lombard

Member of the Louisiana House of Representatives from the 60th district
- In office January 11, 2016 – November 18, 2025
- Preceded by: Karen St. Germain
- Succeeded by: Chasity Martinez

Personal details
- Born: February 1970 (age 56)
- Party: Democratic
- Spouse: Hayley Mendoza Brown
- Children: Clayton and Christian Brown
- Parent(s): Roy and Janice Brown
- Education: Louisiana State University
- Occupation: Former employee, Louisiana Department of Insurance

Chad Michael Brown (born February 1970) is a Democrat from Plaquemine, Louisiana, serving as a Commissioner of the Louisiana Office of Alcohol and Tobacco Control. He is a former member of the Louisiana House of Representatives for District 60 in Iberville and Assumption parishes in the southern portion of his state.

Brown led a four-candidate field in the nonpartisan blanket primary held on October 24, 2015, for the right to succeed the term-limited Representative Karen St. Germain, also of Plaquemine. He polled 7,622 votes (47 percent). The runner-up, No Party candidate James Barker, received 4,240 votes (25.6 percent). Two other candidates, Republican Michael "Mike" Latino and another Democrat, Thomas Gerald Gaudet of Plaquemine (born November 1958), received 3,125 votes (18.8 percent) and 1,597 (9.6 percent), respectively.

In view of Brown's primary lead, Barker elected not to pursue a runoff election, which would have corresponded with the gubernatorial contest on November 21, 2015. Brown hence won the seat without a majority of the votes cast.

Brown resigned from the Louisiana House in November 2025, after being appointed as commissioner of the Louisiana Office of Alcohol and Tobacco Control.

Brown studied at Louisiana State University in Baton Rouge. He is a former employee of the state Insurance Department in Louisiana and Baton Rouge.

Louisiana House of Representatives
Preceded by Karen St. Germain	Louisiana State Representative for District 60 (Assumption and Iberville parishes); Chad Michael Brown; 2016 – 2025	Succeeded by Chasity Martinez
