= Louisiana State Legislature =

Legislative branch of the state government of Louisiana

Louisiana State Legislature Législature de l'État de Louisiane Legislatura del Estado de Luisiana

Type
- Type: Bicameral
- Houses: Senate; House of Representatives
- Term limits: Senate 3 consecutive terms (12 years); House 3 consecutive terms (12 years)
- Established: 1812

Leadership
- Senate President: Cameron Henry (R) since January 8, 2024
- House Speaker: Phillip DeVillier (R) since January 8, 2024

Structure
- Seats: 144 voting members: 39 senators; 105 representatives
- State Senate political groups: Republican (28); Democratic (10)
- House of Representatives political groups: Republican (73); Democratic (32)
- Length of term: Senate 4 years House 4 years
- Salary: $16,800/year + expenses/per diem

Elections
- Last State Senate election: October 14 and November 18, 2023
- Last House of Representatives election: October 14 and November 18, 2023
- Next State Senate election: October 23 and November 20, 2027
- Next House of Representatives election: October 23 and November 20, 2027
- Redistricting: Legislative control

Motto
- Union, justice, and confidence

Meeting place
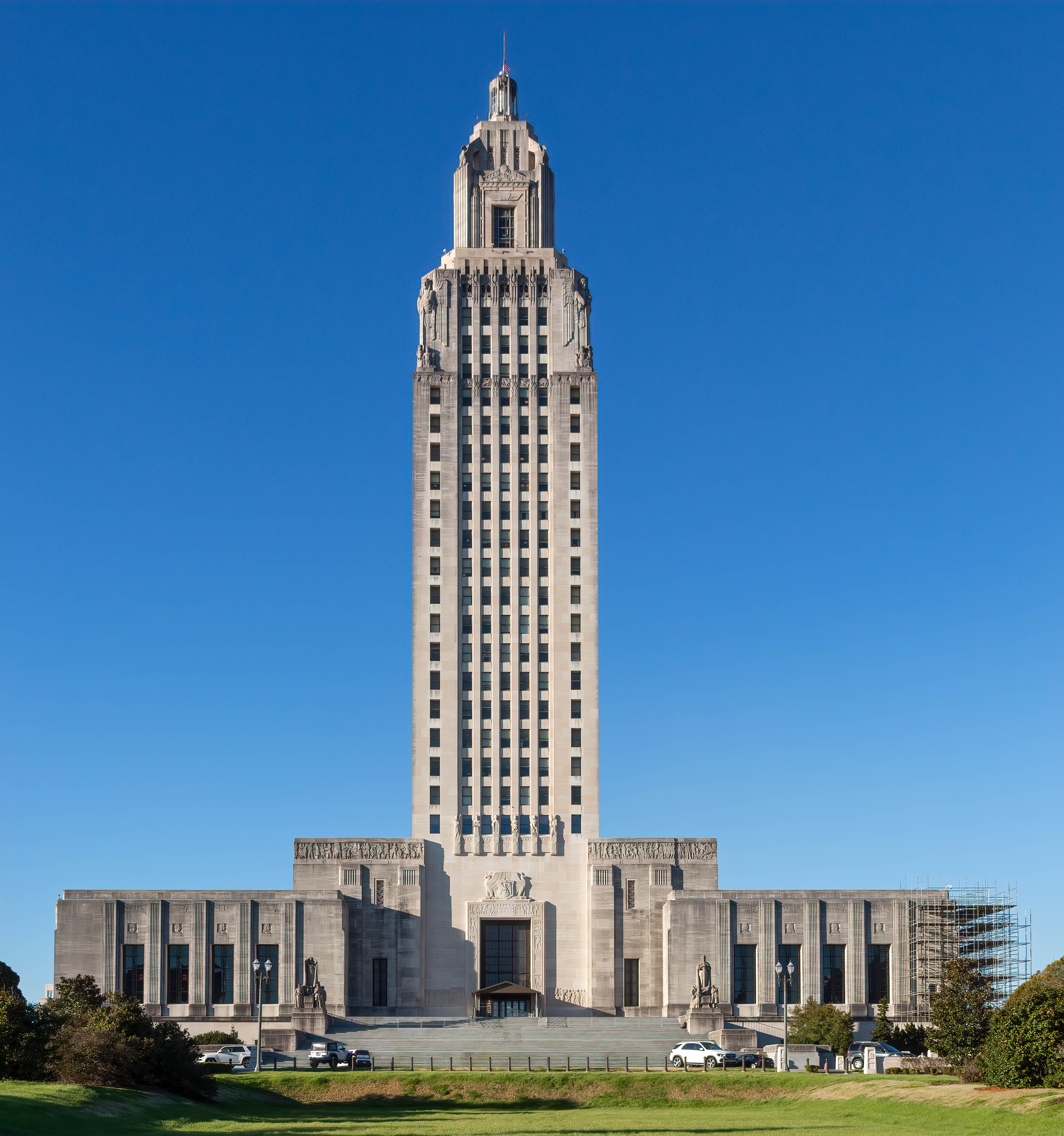
- Louisiana State Capitol; Baton Rouge

Website
- Louisiana State Legislature

Constitution
- Constitution of Louisiana

The Louisiana State Legislature (French: Législature de l'État de Louisiane; Spanish: Legislatura del Estado de Luisiana) is the state legislature of the U.S. state of Louisiana. It is a bicameral body, comprising the lower house, the Louisiana House of Representatives with 105 representatives, and the upper house, the Louisiana State Senate with 39 senators. Members of each house are elected from single-member districts of roughly equal populations.

The Louisiana State Legislature meets in the Louisiana State Capitol in Baton Rouge. In March 2023, Republicans gained a supermajority of the Louisiana legislature for a first in the history of Louisiana.

== Early history ==
Jean Noel Destréhan and Allan Bowie Magruder were selected by the joint legislature to be Louisiana's first United States Senators on September 3, 1812. Destréhan resigned within a month and was replaced with Thomas Posey.

== Terms ==
Members of both chambers are elected to four-year terms. A legislator elected to serve more than two and a half terms within three consecutive terms in one chamber is ineligible for election to that chamber for the following term.

Louisiana voters adopted legislative term limits on October 21, 1995, by approving Amendment 2, which added Article III, Section 4(E) to the Louisiana Constitution. The limits apply to service in terms that began on or after January 8, 1996. They first made incumbents ineligible for reelection in 2007.

== Officers ==
Each chamber elects its officers at the start of each four-year legislative term. The Louisiana House of Representatives elects a speaker and speaker pro tempore from among its members, and the Louisiana State Senate elects a president and president pro tempore from among its members. The House elects a nonmember as clerk, and the Senate elects a nonmember as secretary.

Louisiana governors historically influenced the selection of both presiding officers, sometimes announcing their preferred candidates before legislators voted. Currently, Republicans Phillip DeVillier and Cameron Henry serve as House speaker and Senate president, respectively.

The lieutenant governor presided over the Senate from 1845 until 1976, when the Senate elected Michael H. O'Keefe as its first president under the 1974 constitution.

The lieutenant governor exercises powers delegated by the governor and holds ex officio membership on the same committees, boards and commissions as the governor. The elected lieutenant governor is first in line to fill a vacancy in the governor's office or to act as governor if the governor is formally declared unable to serve. The lieutenant governor also acts as governor when the governor is temporarily out of state. The lieutenant governor supervises the Louisiana Department of Culture, Recreation and Tourism and may appoint its secretary with the Senate's consent.

== Sessions and quorum ==
The legislature holds its annual regular session at the Louisiana State Capitol in Baton Rouge. In even-numbered years, the general session begins at noon on the second Monday of March and ordinarily runs for up to 60 legislative days within 85 calendar days. In odd-numbered years, the limited-jurisdiction session begins at noon on the second Monday of April and ordinarily runs for up to 45 legislative days within 60 calendar days. When necessary to pass an appropriations bill, the legislature may extend a regular session by a recorded two-thirds vote of the elected members of each house. Extensions are granted in increments of two legislative or calendar days, up to six calendar days past the original adjournment deadline.

An organizational session begins on the day legislators take office and may last up to three legislative days. The governor may call an extraordinary session, also known as a special session. The presiding officers of both houses must call one if a majority of the elected members in each chamber petitions for it in writing. The proclamation calling the session specifies the subjects on which the legislature may act and sets its duration, up to 30 calendar days. The constitution also provides for veto sessions to reconsider bills vetoed by the governor.

A quorum requires a majority of a chamber's elected members to be present. The legislature lists the thresholds as 53 representatives in the House and 20 senators in the Senate. Without a quorum, the members present may adjourn until the next day and compel absent members to attend. Each house must keep a journal of its proceedings and publish it immediately after each session ends.

== Political immunity ==
Members of both houses of the Louisiana State Legislature are free from arrest, except for felony, during their attendance at sessions and committee meetings of their house and while going to and from them. No member shall be questioned elsewhere for any speech in either house.

== Veto powers ==
The governor of Louisiana has line-item veto power over appropriations bills. The legislature may override a gubernatorial veto with the approval of two-thirds of the elected members of each house.

== See also ==
- Louisiana House of Representatives
- Louisiana State Senate
- List of Louisiana state legislatures
- Government of Louisiana
