= Troy Romero =

American politician

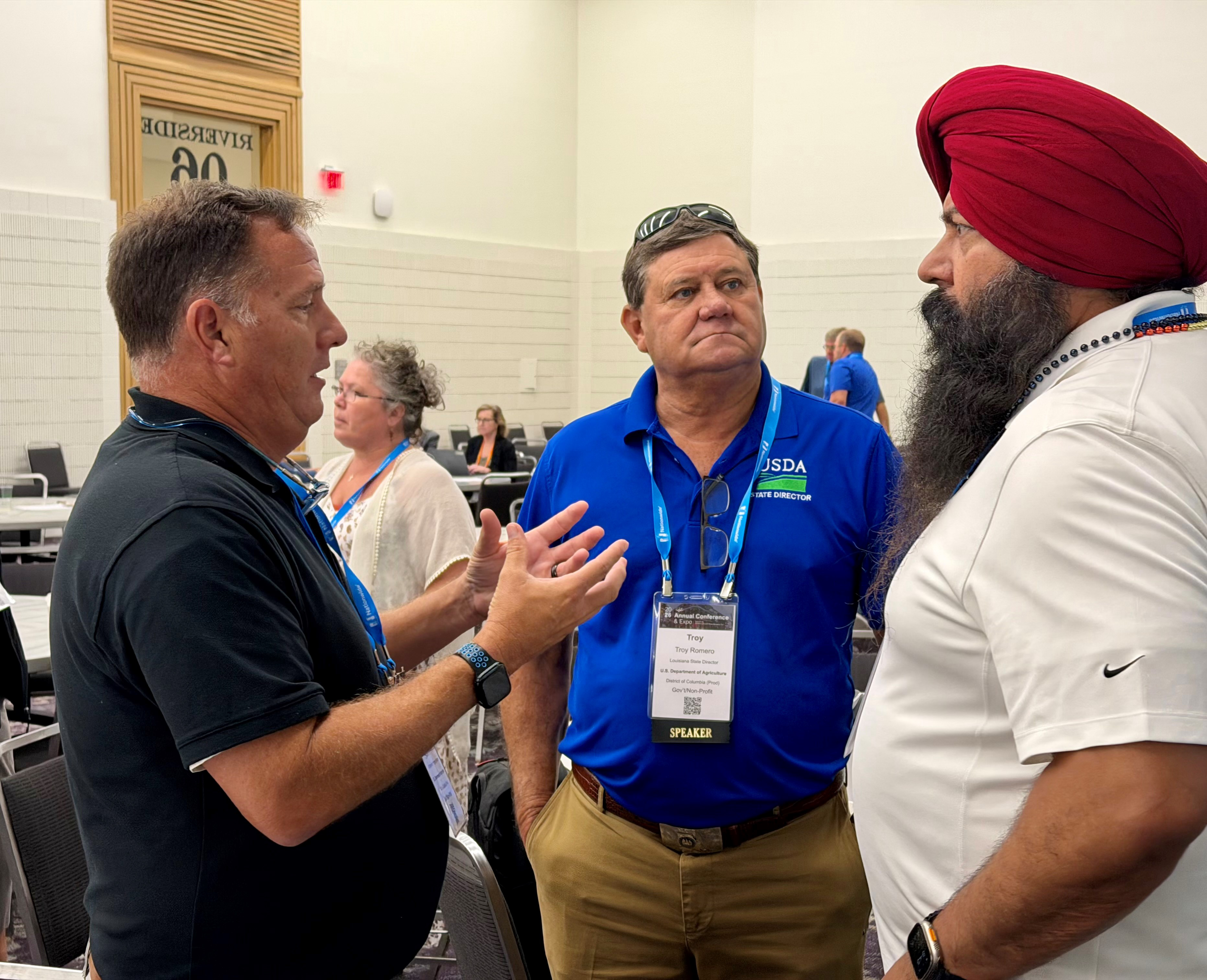

Member of the Louisiana House of Representatives from the 37th district
- In office January 13, 2020 – December 14, 2025
- Preceded by: John Guinn
- Succeeded by: Reese Broussard

Personal details
- Party: Republican
- Children: 4

Troy D. Romero is an American politician and businessman who served as a member of the Louisiana House of Representatives from the 37th district from 2020 to 2025.

== Early life and education ==
A native of Iowa, Louisiana, Romero graduated from Welsh High School and attended Louisiana State University.

== Career ==
Romero is the owner of Sports Turf Specialists, a company that installs turf on athletic fields. He was elected to the Louisiana House of Representatives in November 2019 and assumed office on January 13, 2020. He resigned in December 2025.
