= 2019 Louisiana State Senate election =

- October 12, 2019 and November 16, 2019

All 39 seats of the Louisiana State Senate 20 seats needed for a majority

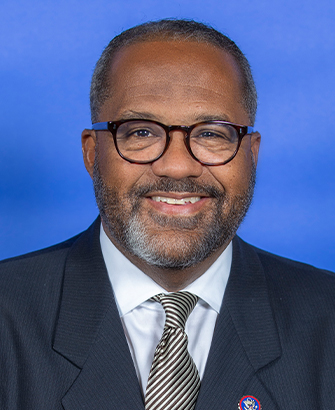
	Majority party	Minority party
Leader	John Alario (term-limited)	Troy Carter
Party	Republican	Democratic
Leader since	January 9, 2012	January 11, 2016
Leader's seat	8th district	7th district
Seats before	25	14
Seats won	27	12
Seat change	▲2	▼2
Popular vote	552,850	269,181
Percentage	65.41%	31.85%
- Results: Republican gain Republican hold Democratic hold
President of the Senate before election
John Alario
Republican
Elected President of the Senate
Page Cortez
Republican

The 2019 Louisiana State Senate election was held on October 12, 2019, with runoff elections held on November 16, 2019. All 39 seats in the Louisiana State Senate were up for election to four-year terms. Under the Louisiana primary system, all candidates appeared on the same ballot, regardless of party. Five districts held runoff elections due to no candidate receiving a majority of the vote in the general election.

The Republican Party expanded their majority by two seats over the Democratic Party, establishing a veto-proof majority in the Senate against Democratic Governor John Bel Edwards. The party failed to gain a veto-proof majority in the concurrent House elections, however.

== Overview ==
Party	Candidates	Votes		Seats		
Party	Candidates	No.	%	Before	After	+/–
Republican	50	552,850	65.41	25	27	▲2
Democratic	31	269,181	31.85	14	12	▼2
Independent	2	14,515	1.72	0	0	Steady
Libertarian	2	8,682	1.03	0	0	Steady
Total		845,228	100.00	39	39	

Popular vote
Republican	65.41%
Democratic	31.85%
Other	2.74%

Senate seats
Republican	69.23%
Democratic	30.77%

=== Summary by district ===
District	Incumbent	Party	Elected Senator	Party
1st	Sharon Hewitt	Rep	Sharon Hewitt	Rep
2nd	Ed Price	Dem	Ed Price	Dem
3rd	Jean-Paul Morrell	Dem	Joseph Bouie Jr.	Dem
4th	Wesley T. Bishop	Dem	Jimmy Harris	Dem
5th	Karen Carter Peterson	Dem	Karen Carter Peterson	Dem
6th	Bodi White	Rep	Bodi White	Rep
7th	Troy Carter	Dem	Troy Carter	Dem
8th	John Alario	Rep	Patrick Connick	Rep
9th	Conrad Appel	Rep	Cameron Henry	Rep
10th	Danny Martiny	Rep	Kirk Talbot	Rep
11th	Jack Donahue	Rep	Patrick McMath	Rep
12th	Beth Mizell	Rep	Beth Mizell	Rep
13th	Dale M. Erdey	Rep	J. Rogers Pope	Rep
14th	Yvonne Dorsey-Colomb	Dem	Cleo Fields	Dem
15th	Regina Barrow	Dem	Regina Barrow	Dem
16th	Dan Claitor	Rep	Franklin Foil	Rep
17th	Rick Ward III	Rep	Rick Ward III	Rep
18th	Eddie J. Lambert	Rep	Eddie J. Lambert	Rep
19th	Gary Smith Jr.	Dem	Gary Smith Jr.	Dem
20th	Norby Chabert	Rep	Mike Fesi	Rep
21st	Bret Allain	Rep	Bret Allain	Rep
22nd	Fred Mills	Rep	Fred Mills	Rep
23rd	Page Cortez	Rep	Page Cortez	Rep
24th	Gerald Boudreaux	Dem	Gerald Boudreaux	Dem
25th	Dan Morrish	Rep	Mark Abraham	Rep
26th	Bob Hensgens	Rep	Bob Hensgens	Rep
27th	Ronnie Johns	Rep	Ronnie Johns	Rep
28th	Eric LaFleur	Dem	Heather Cloud	Rep
29th	Jay Luneau	Dem	Jay Luneau	Dem
30th	John R. Smith	Rep	Mike Reese	Rep
31st	Gerald Long	Rep	Louie Bernard	Rep
32nd	Neil Riser	Rep	Glen Womack	Rep
33rd	Mike Walsworth	Rep	Stewart Cathey Jr.	Rep
34th	Francis C. Thompson	Dem	Katrina Jackson	Dem
35th	James R. Fannin	Rep	Jay Morris	Rep
36th	Ryan Gatti	Rep	Robert Mills	Rep
37th	Barrow Peacock	Rep	Barrow Peacock	Rep
38th	John Milkovich	Dem	Barry Milligan	Rep
39th	Gregory Tarver	Dem	Gregory Tarver	Dem

== Outgoing incumbents ==
=== Republicans ===
1. District 8: John Alario was term-limited.
2. District 9: Conrad Appel was term-limited.
3. District 10: Danny Martiny was term-limited.
4. District 11: Jack Donahue was term-limited.
5. District 13: Dale M. Erdey was term-limited.
6. District 16: Dan Claitor was term-limited.
7. District 20: Norby Chabert was term-limited.
8. District 25: Dan Morrish was term-limited.
9. District 30: John R. Smith was term-limited.
10. District 31: Gerald Long was term-limited.
11. District 32: Neil Riser was term-limited.
12. District 33: Mike Walsworth was term-limited.

=== Democrats ===
1. District 3: Jean-Paul Morrell was term-limited.
2. District 4: Wesley T. Bishop retired.
3. District 14: Yvonne Dorsey-Colomb was term-limited.
4. District 28: Eric LaFleur was term-limited.
5. District 34: Francis C. Thompson was term-limited.

== Predictions ==
Source	Ranking	As of
Sabato	Safe R	October 31, 2019

== Results ==
=== District 1 ===
Incumbent Republican Sharon Hewitt ran unopposed.

=== District 2 ===
2019 Louisiana's 2nd State Senate district election
Party	Candidate	Votes	%
Democratic	Ed Price (incumbent)	21,605	58.84
Democratic	Troy E. Brown	15,114	41.16
Total votes		36,719	100.00
Democratic hold			

=== District 3 ===
2019 Louisiana's 3rd State Senate district election
Primary election
Party	Candidate	Votes	%
Democratic	Joseph Bouie Jr.	12,639	44.33
Democratic	John Bagneris	8,295	29.10
Republican	Kathleen Doody	5,287	18.55
Democratic	Brandon Gregoire	2,287	8.02
Total votes		28,508	100.00
General election
Democratic	Joseph Bouie Jr.	20,734	59.65
Democratic	John Bagneris	14,027	40.35
Total votes		34,761	100.00
Democratic hold			

=== District 4 ===
Democrat Jimmy Harris ran unopposed.

=== District 5 ===
2019 Louisiana's 5th State Senate district election
Party	Candidate	Votes	%
Democratic	Karen Carter Peterson (incumbent)	20,869	79.41
Democratic	Allen Borne Jr.	5,412	20.59
Total votes		26,281	100.00
Democratic hold			

=== District 6 ===
2019 Louisiana's 6th State Senate district election
Party	Candidate	Votes	%
Republican	Bodi White (incumbent)	29,531	79.54
Libertarian	Rufus Craig	7,596	20.46
Total votes		37,127	100.00
Republican hold			

=== District 7 ===
Incumbent Democrat Troy Carter ran unopposed.

=== District 8 ===
Republican Patrick Connick ran unopposed.

=== District 9 ===
2019 Louisiana's 9th State Senate district election
Party	Candidate	Votes	%
Republican	Cameron Henry	23,647	78.38
Republican	Jon Hyers	6,524	21.62
Total votes		30,171	100.00
Republican hold			

=== District 10 ===
2019 Louisiana's 10th State Senate district election
Party	Candidate	Votes	%
Republican	Kirk Talbot	16,699	54.89
Republican	Arita Lipps Bohannan	13,723	45.11
Total votes		30,422	100.00
Republican hold			

=== District 11 ===
2019 Louisiana's 11th State Senate district election
Primary election
Party	Candidate	Votes	%
Republican	Reid Falconer	20,404	47.45
Republican	Patrick McMath	17,248	40.11
Republican	Daniel Ducote	5,345	12.43
Total votes		42,997	100.00
General election
Republican	Patrick McMath	27,801	55.60
Republican	Reid Falconer	22,198	44.40
Total votes		49,999	100.00
Republican hold			

=== District 12 ===
2019 Louisiana's 12th State Senate district election
Party	Candidate	Votes	%
Republican	Beth Mizell (incumbent)	24,590	68.58
Democratic	Darrell Fairburn	11,266	31.42
Total votes		35,856	100.00
Republican hold			

=== District 13 ===
2019 Louisiana's 13th State Senate district election
Party	Candidate	Votes	%
Republican	J. Rogers Pope	17,030	50.45
Republican	Edith Carlin	12,860	38.09
Republican	Deven W. Cavalier	3,869	11.46
Total votes		33,759	100.00
Republican hold			

=== District 14 ===
2019 Louisiana's 14th State Senate district election
Party	Candidate	Votes	%
Democratic	Cleo Fields	13,529	52.52
Democratic	Patricia Haynes Smith	12,229	47.48
Total votes		25,758	100.00
Democratic hold			

=== District 15 ===
2019 Louisiana's 15th State Senate district election
Party	Candidate	Votes	%
Democratic	Regina Barrow (incumbent)	22,840	74.50
Democratic	Gary Chambers	7,819	25.50
Total votes		30,659	100.00
Democratic hold			

=== District 16 ===
2019 Louisiana's 16th State Senate district election
Primary election
Party	Candidate	Votes	%
Democratic	Beverly Brooks Thompson	14,213	33.71
Republican	Franklin Foil	12,523	29.70
Republican	Stephen Carter	12,519	29.69
Republican	Bob Bell	1,826	4.33
Libertarian	Everett Baudean	1,086	2.58
Total votes		42,167	100.00
General election
Republican	Franklin Foil	27,090	57.64
Democratic	Beverly Brooks Thompson	19,912	42.36
Total votes		47,002	100.00
Republican hold			

=== District 17 ===
Incumbent Republican Rick Ward III ran unopposed.

=== District 18 ===
Incumbent Republican Eddie J. Lambert ran unopposed.

=== District 19 ===
Incumbent Democrat Gary Smith Jr. ran unopposed.

=== District 20 ===
2019 Louisiana's 20th State Senate district election
Party	Candidate	Votes	%
Republican	Mike Fesi	15,546	54.48
Republican	Damon J. Baldone	5,162	18.09
Democratic	Jerry Gisclair	4,070	14.26
Democratic	Brenda Leroux Babin	2,785	9.76
Republican	Shane Swan	974	3.41
Total votes		28,537	100.00
Republican hold			

=== District 21 ===
Incumbent Republican Bret Allain ran unopposed.

=== District 22 ===
Incumbent Republican Fred Mills ran unopposed.

=== District 23 ===
Incumbent Republican Page Cortez ran unopposed.

=== District 24 ===
2019 Louisiana's 24th State Senate district election
Party	Candidate	Votes	%
Democratic	Gerald Boudreaux (incumbent)	24,418	75.50
Independent	Cory Levier I	7,922	24.50
Total votes		32,340	100.00
Democratic hold			

=== District 25 ===
2019 Louisiana's 25th State Senate district election
Party	Candidate	Votes	%
Republican	Mark Abraham	19,670	54.09
Republican	Kevin M. Berken	8,553	23.52
Republican	Johnny Guinn	8,144	22.39
Total votes		36,367	100.00
Republican hold			

=== District 26 ===
2019 Louisiana's 26th State Senate district election
Party	Candidate	Votes	%
Republican	Bob Hensgens (incumbent)	27,228	79.18
Democratic	Jerry Gaspard	7,161	20.82
Total votes		34,389	100.00
Republican hold			

=== District 27 ===
Incumbent Republican Ronnie Johns ran unopposed.

=== District 28 ===
2019 Louisiana's 28th State Senate district election
Party	Candidate	Votes	%
Republican	Heather Cloud	22,293	63.14
Democratic	Robert Johnson	8,370	23.71
Democratic	H. Bernard LeBas	4,646	13.16
Total votes		35,309	100.00
Republican gain from Democratic			

=== District 29 ===
Incumbent Democrat Jay Luneau ran unopposed.

=== District 30 ===
2019 Louisiana's 30th State Senate district election
Party	Candidate	Votes	%
Republican	Mike Reese	14,625	50.73
Republican	Brett Geymann	8,296	21.84
Democratic	James K. Armes III	5,973	20.72
Republican	Reneé Hoffpauir-Klann	1,935	6.71
Total votes		30,829	100.00
Republican hold			

=== District 31 ===
2019 Louisiana's 31st State Senate district election
Party	Candidate	Votes	%
Republican	Louie Bernard	18,529	55.30
Republican	Trey Flynn	8,596	25.66
Republican	Douglas Brown	6,381	19.04
Total votes		33,506	100.00
Republican hold			

=== District 32 ===
2019 Louisiana's 32nd State Senate district election
Party	Candidate	Votes	%
Republican	Glen Womack	18,588	50.11
Republican	Steve May	11,400	30.73
Democratic	Judy Duhon	4,763	12.84
Democratic	Danny Cole	2,341	6.31
Total votes		37,092	100.00
Republican hold			

=== District 33 ===
2019 Louisiana's 33rd State Senate district election
Party	Candidate	Votes	%
Republican	Stewart Cathey Jr.	16,658	51.95
Republican	Wade Bishop	15,407	48.05
Total votes		32,065	100.00
Republican hold			

=== District 34 ===
Democrat Katrina Jackson ran unopposed.

=== District 35 ===
2019 Louisiana's 35th State Senate district election
Primary election
Party	Candidate	Votes	%
Republican	James R. Fannin (incumbent)	12,559	38.65
Republican	Jay Morris	11,782	36.26
Republican	Matt Parker	8,154	25.09
Total votes		32,495	100.00
General election
Republican	Jay Morris	18,167	50.38
Republican	James R. Fannin (incumbent)	17,894	49.62
Total votes		36,061	100.00
Republican hold			

=== District 36 ===
2019 Louisiana's 36th State Senate district election
Primary election
Party	Candidate	Votes	%
Republican	Robert Mills	16,305	47.73
Republican	Ryan Gatti (incumbent)	12,882	37.71
Democratic	Mattie Preston	4,976	14.57
Total votes		34,163	100.00
General election
Republican	Robert Mills	22,050	56.17
Republican	Ryan Gatti (incumbent)	17,209	43.83
Total votes		39,259	100.00
Republican hold			

=== District 37 ===
2019 Louisiana's 37th State Senate district election
Party	Candidate	Votes	%
Republican	Barrow Peacock (incumbent)	16,221	71.10
Independent	Debbie Hollis	6,593	28.90
Total votes		22,814	100.00
Republican hold			

=== District 38 ===
2019 Louisiana's 38th State Senate district election
Party	Candidate	Votes	%
Republican	Barry Milligan	16,266	50.72
Democratic	John Milkovich (incumbent)	8,447	26.34
Democratic	Katrina D. Early	7,359	22.95
Total votes		32,072	100.00
Republican gain from Democratic			

=== District 39 ===
2019 Louisiana's 39th State Senate district election
Party	Candidate	Votes	%
Democratic	Gregory Tarver (incumbent)	15,755	69.02
Republican	Jim Slagle	7,071	30.98
Total votes		22,826	100.00
Democratic hold			

== See also ==
- 2019 Louisiana elections
- 2019 Louisiana House of Representatives election
