= 2015 Louisiana State Senate election =

- October 24 and November 21, 2015

All 39 seats in the Louisiana State Senate 20 seats needed for a majority

	Majority party	Minority party
Leader	John Alario	Eric LaFleur
Party	Republican	Democratic
Leader since	January 9, 2012
Leader's seat	District 8	District 28
Last election	26	13
Seats after	25	14
Seat change	▼1	▲1
President of the Senate before election
John Alario
Republican
Elected President of the Senate
John Alario
Republican

The 2015 Louisiana State Senate election was held on October 24, 2015, with runoff elections taking place on November 21, 2015, to determine which party would control the Louisiana State Senate for the following four years in the 71st Louisiana Legislature. All 39 seats in the Louisiana State Senate were up for election and the primary was held on October 24, 2015. The elections for state senate were held alongside concurrent State House elections. Under the Louisiana primary system, all candidates appeared on the same ballot, regardless of party. Four districts held runoff elections on November 21, 2015, due to no candidate receiving a majority of the vote in the general election. Prior to the election, 26 seats were held by Republicans and 13 seats were held by Democrats. The general election saw Democrats gain a single seat, meaning that the Republicans retained their majority in the State Senate.

== Retirements ==
=== Democrats ===
1. District 4: Edwin R. Murray was term-limited.
2. District 7: David Heitmeier retired.
3. District 12: Ben Nevers was term-limited.
4. District 15: Sharon Weston Broome was term-limited.
5. District 29: Richard Gallot Jr. retired.

=== Republicans ===
1. District 1: A. G. Crowe retired.
2. District 18: Jody Amedee was term-limited.
3. District 24: Elbert Guillory retired.
4. District 35: Robert Kostelka was term-limited.
5. District 36: Robert Adley was term-limited.
6. District 38: Sherri Smith Buffington was term-limited.

== Closest races ==
Seats where the margin of victory was under 10%:

1. District 36, 1.18%
2. District 38, 4.88% (gain)
3. District 35, 5.80%
4. District 20, 8.48%

== Results ==
=== District 1 ===
District 1 election, 2015
Party	Candidate	Votes	%
Republican	Sharon Hewitt	15,537	58.97%
Republican	Pete Schneider	10,810	41.03%
Total votes		26,347	100.0%
Republican hold			

=== District 2 ===
District 2 election, 2015
Party	Candidate	Votes	%
Democratic	Troy E. Brown (incumbent)	23,829	71.97%
Independent	Eric Weil	5,208	15.73%
Democratic	Chris Delpit	4,072	12.30%
Total votes		33,109	100.0%
Democratic hold			

=== District 3 ===
District 3 election, 2015
Party	Candidate	Votes	%
Democratic	Jean-Paul Morrell (incumbent)		100.0%
Total votes			100.0%
Democratic hold			

=== District 4 ===
District 4 election, 2015
Party	Candidate	Votes	%
Democratic	Wesley T. Bishop	16,336	64.84%
Democratic	R. Erich Caulfield	6,195	24.59%
Democratic	Joseph Swider	2,665	10.57%
Total votes		25,196	100.0%
Democratic hold			

=== District 5 ===
District 5 election, 2015
Party	Candidate	Votes	%
Democratic	Karen Carter Peterson (incumbent)		100.0%
Total votes			100.0%
Democratic hold			

=== District 6 ===
District 6 election, 2015
Party	Candidate	Votes	%
Republican	Bodi White (incumbent)		100.0%
Total votes			100.0%
Republican hold			

=== District 7 ===
District 7 election, 2015
Primary election
Party	Candidate	Votes	%
Democratic	Troy Carter	7,700	37.36%
Democratic	Jeff Arnold	6,858	33.27%
Democratic	Leslie Ellison	3,097	15.02%
Democratic	Roy A. Glapion	2,957	14.35%
Total votes		20,612	100.0%
General election
Democratic	Troy Carter	12,935	56.76%
Democratic	Jeff Arnold	9,852	43.24%
Total votes		22,787	100.0%
Democratic hold			

=== District 8 ===
District 8 election, 2015
Party	Candidate	Votes	%
Republican	John Alario (incumbent)		100.0%
Total votes			100.0%
Republican hold			

=== District 9 ===
District 9 election, 2015
Party	Candidate	Votes	%
Republican	Conrad Appel (incumbent)	14,701	56.96%
Republican	John LaBruzzo	11,109	43.04%
Total votes		25,810	100.0%
Republican hold			

=== District 10 ===
District 10 election, 2015
Party	Candidate	Votes	%
Republican	Danny Martiny (incumbent)		100.0%
Total votes			100.0%
Republican hold			

=== District 11 ===
District 11 election, 2015
Party	Candidate	Votes	%
Republican	Jack Donahue (incumbent)		100.0%
Total votes			100.0%
Republican hold			

=== District 12 ===
District 12 election, 2015
Primary election
Party	Candidate	Votes	%
Republican	Beth Mizell	14,344	43.37%
Democratic	Mickey Murphy	10,767	32.55%
Republican	Brett Duncan	6,827	20.64%
Independent	John Seal	1,138	3.44%
Total votes		33,075	100.0%
General election
Republican	Beth Mizell	19,404	58.03%
Democratic	Mickey Murphy	14,033	41.97%
Total votes		33,437	100.0%
Republican gain from Democratic			

=== District 13 ===
District 13 election, 2015
Party	Candidate	Votes	%
Republican	Dale M. Erdey (incumbent)	17,117	63.94%
Republican	Derek Babcock	9,655	36.06%
Total votes		26,772	100.0%
Republican hold			

=== District 14 ===
District 14 election, 2015
Party	Candidate	Votes	%
Democratic	Yvonne Dorsey-Colomb (incumbent)		100.0%
Total votes			100.0%
Democratic hold			

=== District 15 ===
District 15 election, 2015
Party	Candidate	Votes	%
Democratic	Regina Barrow	14,101	53.05%
Democratic	Dalton Honore	8,796	33.09%
Republican	Jerrie Davenport Williams	3,683	13.86%
Total votes		26,580	100.0%
Democratic hold			

=== District 16 ===
District 16 election, 2015
Party	Candidate	Votes	%
Republican	Dan Claitor (incumbent)	16,506	50.74%
Republican	Scott McKnight	11,462	35.23%
Independent	Brent Campanella	4,564	14.03%
Total votes		25,634	100.0%
Republican hold			

=== District 17 ===
District 17 election, 2015
Party	Candidate	Votes	%
Republican	Rick Ward III (incumbent)		100.0%
Total votes			100.0%
Republican hold			

=== District 18 ===
District 18 election, 2015
Party	Candidate	Votes	%
Republican	Eddie J. Lambert		100.0%
Total votes			100.0%
Republican hold			

=== District 19 ===
District 19 election, 2015
Party	Candidate	Votes	%
Democratic	Gary Smith Jr. (incumbent)		100.0%
Total votes			100.0%
Democratic hold			

=== District 20 ===
District 20 election, 2015
Party	Candidate	Votes	%
Republican	Norby Chabert (incumbent)	11,921	51.12%
Republican	Mike Fesi	9,944	42.64%
Independent	Mark Atzenhoffer	1,456	6.24%
Total votes		23,321	100.0%
Republican hold			

=== District 21 ===
District 21 election, 2015
Party	Candidate	Votes	%
Republican	Bret Allain (incumbent)		100.0%
Total votes			100.0%
Republican hold			

=== District 22 ===
District 22 election, 2015
Party	Candidate	Votes	%
Republican	Fred Mills (incumbent)		100.0%
Total votes			100.0%
Republican hold			

=== District 23 ===
District 23 election, 2015
Party	Candidate	Votes	%
Republican	Page Cortez (incumbent)	27,231	83.88%
Independent	Terry Hughes	5,235	16.12%
Total votes		32,466	100.0%
Republican hold			

=== District 24 ===
District 24 election, 2015
Party	Candidate	Votes	%
Democratic	Gerald Boudreaux	17,846	60.75%
Democratic	Ledricka Thierry	11,528	39.25%
Total votes		29,374	100.0%
Democratic gain from Republican			

=== District 25 ===
District 25 election, 2015
Party	Candidate	Votes	%
Republican	Dan Morrish (incumbent)		100.0%
Total votes			100.0%
Republican hold			

=== District 26 ===
District 26 election, 2015
Party	Candidate	Votes	%
Republican	Jonathan Perry (incumbent)		100.0%
Total votes			100.0%
Republican hold			

=== District 27 ===
District 27 election, 2015
Party	Candidate	Votes	%
Republican	Ronnie Johns (incumbent)	14,648	64.96%
Democratic	Ginger Vidrine	7,901	35.04%
Total votes		22,549	100.0%
Republican hold			

=== District 28 ===
District 28 election, 2015
Party	Candidate	Votes	%
Democratic	Eric LaFleur (incumbent)		100.0%
Total votes			100.0%
Democratic hold			

=== District 29 ===
District 29 election, 2015
Party	Candidate	Votes	%
Democratic	Jay Luneau	13,462	59.34%
Republican	Joshua Dara	9,225	40.66%
Total votes		22,687	100.0%
Democratic hold			

=== District 30 ===
District 30 election, 2015
Party	Candidate	Votes	%
Republican	John R. Smith (incumbent)		100.0%
Total votes			100.0%
Republican hold			

=== District 31 ===
District 31 election, 2015
Party	Candidate	Votes	%
Republican	Gerald Long (incumbent)		100.0%
Total votes			100.0%
Republican hold			

=== District 32 ===
District 32 election, 2015
Party	Candidate	Votes	%
Republican	Neil Riser (incumbent)		100.0%
Total votes			100.0%
Republican hold			

=== District 33 ===
District 33 election, 2015
Party	Candidate	Votes	%
Republican	Mike Walsworth (incumbent)	15,891	62.28%
Republican	Vance McAllister	9,626	37.72%
Total votes		25,517	100.0%
Republican hold			

=== District 34 ===
District 34 election, 2015
Party	Candidate	Votes	%
Democratic	Francis C. Thompson (incumbent)		100.0%
Total votes			100.0%
Democratic hold			

=== District 35 ===
District 35 election, 2015
Party	Candidate	Votes	%
Republican	James R. Fannin	13,430	52.90%
Republican	Stewart Cathey Jr.	11,956	47.10%
Total votes		25,386	100.0%
Republican hold			

=== District 36 ===
District 36 election, 2015
Primary election
Party	Candidate	Votes	%
Republican	Henry Lee Burns	10,202	40.30%
Republican	Ryan Gatti	8,649	34.16%
Democratic	Todd Hollenshead	6,465	25.54%
Total votes		25,316	100.0%
General election
Republican	Ryan Gatti	14,023	50.59%
Republican	Henry Lee Burns	13,698	49.41%
Total votes		27,721	100.0%
Republican hold			

=== District 37 ===
District 37 election, 2015
Party	Candidate	Votes	%
Republican	Barrow Peacock (incumbent)		100.0%
Total votes			100.0%
Republican hold			

=== District 38 ===
District 38 election, 2015
Primary election
Party	Candidate	Votes	%
Republican	Richard Burford	9,566	35.16%
Democratic	John Milkovich	9,061	33.31%
Republican	Cloyce Clark	5,885	21.63%
Democratic	Jemayel Warren	2,693	9.90%
Total votes		27,205	100.0%
General election
Democratic	John Milkovich	15,665	52.44%
Republican	Richard Burford	14,206	47.56%
Total votes		29,871	100.0%
Democratic gain from Republican			

=== District 39 ===
District 39 election, 2015
Party	Candidate	Votes	%
Democratic	Gregory Tarver (incumbent)		100.0%
Total votes			100.0%
Democratic hold			
