= Louisiana's 20th House of Representatives district =

American legislative district

Louisiana's 20th State House of Representatives district
Representative
Neil Riser; R–Columbia

Louisiana's 20th House of Representatives district is one of 105 Louisiana House of Representatives districts. It is currently represented by Republican Neil Riser of Columbia.

== Geography ==
HD20 includes the towns of Columbia, Olla, and Jena, as well as a small part of the city of Monroe.

== Election results ==
Year	Winning candidate	Party	Percent	Opponent	Party	Percent
2011	Steven Pylant	Republican	56.3%	Cleve Womack	Democratic	43.7%
2015	Steven Pylant	Republican	61.1%	Cleve Womack	Democratic	38.9%
2019	Neil Riser	Republican	50.8%	Kevin Bates	Republican	49.2%
2023	Neil Riser	Republican	57.2%	Kevin Bates	Republican	42.8%
