= Donald E. Hines =

American politician and physician (1933–2019)

Louisiana State Senator for District 28
- In office January 1993 – January 2008
- Preceded by: John Saunders
- Succeeded by: Eric LaFleur

President of the Louisiana State Senate
- In office 2004–2008
- Preceded by: John Hainkel
- Succeeded by: Joel Chaisson

Personal details
- Born: Donald Elliott Hines; November 14, 1933 Bunkie, Louisiana, U.S.
- Died: June 18, 2019 (aged 85) Bunkie, Louisiana, U.S.
- Party: Democratic
- Spouse: Jacqueline Ewing Hines (born October 1935)
- Children: Donna Louise Newton Richard Arvie Hines; Christopher Arthur Hine; Henry Arthur Hines; Scott Alan Hines Virginia Marie Long
- Education: University of Louisiana at Lafayette; Louisiana State University Health Sciences Center New Orleans
- Occupation: Physician

Military service
- Branch/service: United States Navy

Donald Elliott "Doc" Hines (November 14, 1933 – June 18, 2019) was an American family physician in Bunkie in Avoyelles Parish, Louisiana, who was from 1993 to 2008 a member of the Louisiana State Senate for District 28. In his last term from 2004 to 2008, he was the Senate President under his political ally, Democratic Governor Kathleen Blanco.

== Biography ==
Hines completed his undergraduate studies from the University of Louisiana at Lafayette and obtained his M.D. from the Louisiana State University Health Sciences Center in New Orleans. He served as a second lieutenant in the United States Navy from 1959 to 1963. Near the end of his naval service Hines received the Commendation Medal in 1963 for bravely jumping out of a helicopter into the swamps south of New Iberia to rescue his fellow military men who needed medical attention following an aircraft crash.

He began his medical practice in 1966. He is a member of the Louisiana and the Avoyelles Parish medical societies. Hines was a member of the Avoyelles Parish School Board from 1972 until his election to the state Senate. From 1984 to 1990, Hines was the director of the Louisiana Wildlife and Fisheries Commission and served at the end of his tenure there as the commission chairman. In that capacity, he work to preserve wildlife and public land. As state senator, he was involved in Hurricane Katrina recovery and secured funding to transform the Haas Auditorium in Bunkie into a hurricane evacuation and civic center.

Hines won a special election on January 16, 1993, to succeed Senator John Saunders, who resigned after seventeen years in the office. In addition to his own Avoyelles Parish, District 28 included in 1993 all or parts of the following: Allen, Calcasieu, Evangeline, Jeff Davis, and St. Landry parishes. Hines polled 15,314 votes (58 percent) to 11,094 (42 percent) for his intraparty opponent, I. Jackson Burson, Jr, a lawyer from Eunice.

Hines was elected to his first full term in 1995 with opposition from one other Democrat. From 1996 to 2000, a portion of Avoyelles Parish was also represented in the state Senate by a second physician and a former professional football player, Republican Tommy Casanova of Crowley in Acadia Parish. Hines won his third and fourth terms without opposition in 1999 and 2003.

In 2006, Hines was inducted into the Louisiana Political Museum and Hall of Fame in Winnfield. In its announcement of his induction, the Hall of Fame called his a "country doctor ... who became one of the Senate's most articulate spokesmen for the needs of the working class and poor people." Hines chaired the task force that created the Louisiana Children's Health Insurance Program. He also authored the Rural Hospital Preservation Act and the SeniorRX Prescription Program. He helped to establish the Gene Therapy Research Initiative.

Term-limited in the Senate, Hines was succeeded by his fellow Democrat Eric LaFleur of Ville Platte in Evangeline Parish. LaFleur won the Senate seat on November 17, 2007, when he defeated in a runoff contest, Donald Newton of Bunkie, a grandson of Donald Hines.

Hines died at the age of 85 on June 18, 2019.

Preceded by John Saunders	Louisiana State Senator for District 28; Donald Elliott Hines; 1993–2008	Succeeded by Eric LaFleur
Preceded by John Hainkel	President of the Louisiana State Senate; Donald Elliott Hines; 2004–2008	Succeeded by Joel Chaisson
