= Senator Womack =

Senator Womack may refer to:

- Glen Womack (fl. 2020s), Louisiana State Senate
- Shawn Womack (born 1972), Arkansas State Senate
