= Chris Ullo =

American politician

- Ullo's picture

Member of the Louisiana House of Representatives
- In office May 1972 – March 1988
- Succeeded by: Steve Theriot

Member of the Louisiana State Senate from the 8th district
- In office March 1988 – January 2008
- Preceded by: Elwyn Nicholson
- Succeeded by: John Alario

Personal details
- Born: J. Chris Ullo; March 16, 1928 Marrero, Louisiana, U.S.
- Died: January 16, 2014 (aged 85) Metairie, Louisiana, U.S.
- Party: Democratic
- Spouse: Joyce Ann Daigle
- Children: 4
- Education: Tulane University

J. Chris Ullo (March 16, 1928 – January 16, 2014) was an American politician. He served as a Democratic member of the Louisiana House of Representatives. Ullo also served as a member for the 8th district of the Louisiana State Senate.

== Life and career ==
Born in Marrero, Louisiana, Ullo attended Marrero High School. He then went on to Tulane University.

In 1972, Ullo was elected to serve as a member of the Louisiana House of Representatives. He was succeeded by Steve Theriot. Ullo served from May 1972 to March 1988. After that, he was elected to represent 8th district of the Louisiana State Senate. Ullo succeeded Elwyn Nicholson and was later succeeded by John Alario in 2008.

Ullo died in January 2014 at the East Jefferson General Hospital in Metairie, Louisiana, at the age of 85.
