= Shirley D. Bowler =

American politician

Louisiana House of Representatives (District 78 – Jefferson Parish)
- In office 1992–2008
- Preceded by: Robert T. Garrity, Jr.
- Succeeded by: Kirk Talbot

Personal details
- Born: Shirley Duvingeaud; October 2, 1949 (age 76) New Orleans, Louisiana, U.S.
- Party: Republican
- Spouse: Michael J. Bowler
- Children: 3
- Education: St. Mary's Dominican High School; University of New Orleans
- Occupation: Writer; editor; former educator

Shirley Bowler (born October 2, 1949) is a writer and editor who served as a member of the Louisiana House of Representatives from 1992 until term-limited in 2008. A Republican, she represented Louisiana House District 78, which includes her hometown of Harahan, Jefferson Parish in suburban New Orleans.

== Biography ==
Shirley Duvigneaud (later Bowler) was born in New Orleans. She attended Saint Mary's Dominican High School in New Orleans. She was Alumnae Coordinator and Alumnae Association vice president and later Alum of the Year, an honor bestowed for lifetime achievement and promoting the fundamentals of the school. Her BA degree is from the University of New Orleans. She has additional training as a television advertising producer. From 1971–77, she was a schoolteacher. Bowler was one of the first women admitted to the Harahan Rotary International and served as the club's vice president, treasurer, and president.

She is married to Michael J. Bowler. They have three children.

== Political career ==
Bowler was elected to the House in the nonpartisan blanket primary held in October 1991, when she unseated the one-term Republican Robert T. Garrity, Jr., 8,986 (59.3 percent) to 6,167 (40.7 percent).

In the House, Bowler served on the following committees:

- House Legislative Services Council (of which she was vice-chair)
- Civil Law and Procedure
- Insurance
- Labor and Industrial Relations
- House Special Committee on Disaster Planning – Jefferson Subcommittee (Katrina aftermath)
- House Special Committee on Disaster Planning, Crisis Management, Recovery & Long-Term Revitalization (Katrina aftermath)

On September 11, 2006, Bowler represented the Louisiana Legislative Women's Caucus on the annual convention program of the American Bankers Insurance Association (ABIA) in Washington, D.C. Bowler has also been active in the Louisiana State Law Institute (LSLI), serving on its Bond for Deed Committee and Visitation Committee.

While in the House, she earned the nickname "The Black Widow" for being the person most likely to kill a colleague's bill. During her last term in office, having accepted the nickname, she purchased 50 gold plated "Black Widow" pins and gave them out to legislators who unknowingly killed a bill that she deemed necessary of rejection. She was also known by most legislators to have read all the bills or at least most of them, and every bill she voted on. Such claims are generally folklore, but it thought that she read more bills than any other legislator during her tenure.

Upon departing the legislature she was appointed to the position of Deputy Commissioner of Management and Finance for the Louisiana Department of Insurance as an appointee of the elected Commissioner, James "Jim" Donelon.

She was succeeded by Representative Kirk Talbot. During much of her House tenure, her District 77 colleague from St. Tammany and Tangipahoa parishes was Diane Winston, a fellow Republican.

Preceded by Robert T. Garrity, Jr.	Louisiana State Representative from District 78 (Jefferson Parish); Shirley Duvigneaud Bowler; 1992–2008	Succeeded by Kirk Talbot
