= 2015 Louisiana House of Representatives election =

- October 24, 2015

All 105 seats in the Louisiana House of Representatives 53 seats needed for a majority
	Majority party	Minority party
Party	Republican	Democratic
Speaker before election
Republican
Elected Speaker
Republican

The 2015 Louisiana House of Representatives election was held on October 24, 2015, with runoff elections taking place on November 21, 2015. All 105 seats in the Louisiana House of Representatives were up for election to four-year terms. It was held concurrently with elections for all statewide offices and the Louisiana State Senate.

== Background ==
In the 2011 state legislature elections, Republicans expanded their majorities in both chambers to 58 in the House and 24 in the Senate.

== Overview ==
↓
61	2	42
Republican	(Note: There were two Independents.)	Democratic

== Retirements ==
Twenty-one incumbents did not seek re-election.

=== Democrats ===
1. District 2: Roy A. Burrell was term-limited (ran for Caddo Commission).
2. District 4: Patrick Williams retired.
3. District 29: Regina Barrow was term-limited (successfully ran for State Senate).
4. District 40: Ledricka Thierry retired to run for State Senate.
5. District 41: Mickey Guillory was term-limited.
6. District 60: Karen St. Germain was term-limited.
7. District 63: Dalton Honore retired to run for State Senate.
8. District 72: John Bel Edwards retired to successfully run for Governor.
9. District 75: Harold Ritchie was term-limited.
10. District 99: Wesley Bishop retired to successfully run for State Senate.
11. District 100: Austin Badon was term-limited.

=== Republican ===
1. District 7: Richard Burford retired to run for State Senate.
2. District 9: Henry Burns retired to run for State Senate.
3. District 13: James Fannin was term-limited (successfully ran for State Senate).
4. District 35: Brett Geymann was term-limited.
5. District 36: Chuck Kleckley was term-limited.
6. District 45: Joel Robideaux was term-limited (successfully ran for mayor-president of Lafayette Parish).
7. District 52: Gordon Dove was term-limited.
8. District 59: Eddie J. Lambert was term-limited (successfully ran for State Senate).
9. District 89: Timothy Burns was term-limited.

== Resignations and deaths ==
2 seats were left vacant on election day due to resignation or death.

=== Democratic ===
1. District 61: Alfred C. Williams died on August 4, 2015.

=== Republican ===
1. District 69: Erich Ponti resigned on June 19, 2015 to become director of the Louisiana Asphalt Pavement Association.

== See also ==
- 2015 United States state legislative elections
- 2015 Louisiana State Senate election
