= Robert T. Garrity Jr. =

American politician

Member of the Louisiana House of Representatives from the 78th district
- In office 1988–1992
- Preceded by: Eddie Doucet
- Succeeded by: Shirley D. Bowler

Personal details
- Party: Republican
- Education: University of New Orleans; Loyola University New Orleans College of Law

Robert T. Garrity Jr. is an American politician. He served as a Republican member for the 78th district of the Louisiana House of Representatives.

Garrity attended the University of New Orleans and went on to the Loyola University New Orleans College of Law.

In 1988, Garrity was elected to represent the 78th district in the Louisiana House of Representatives, succeeding Eddie Doucet. In 1992, Garrity was succeeded by Shirley D. Bowler. He was a member of the nonprofit organization Ducks Unlimited.
