= Jay Morris =

American politician

John Clyde "Jay" Morris III

Member of the Louisiana Senate from the 35th district
- Incumbent
- Assumed office January 13, 2020
- Preceded by: James R. Fannin

Member of the Louisiana House of Representatives from the 14th district
- In office January 9, 2012 – January 13, 2020
- Preceded by: Sam Little
- Succeeded by: Michael Echols

Personal details
- Born: May 24, 1958 (age 68) Place of birth missing
- Party: Republican
- Education: Louisiana State University; Louisiana State University Law Center
- Occupation: Businessman; lawyer

John Clyde Morris III (born May 24, 1958) is a businessman and attorney from Monroe who has been a member of the Louisiana State Senate for the 35th district in North Louisiana since 2020. A Republican, from 2012 until 2020, Morris was a member of the Louisiana House of Representatives from District 14, which encompasses Ouachita and Morehouse parishes in the northeastern portion of his state.

== Background ==
Morris formerly worked on Capitol Hill in Washington, D.C., for former U.S. Senator J. Bennett Johnston, Jr., a Democrat. He was also a staff member at one time for the Louisiana Municipal Association. He is a partner of the law firm, Dean Morris, LLP.

Prior to residing in Monroe, Morris lived in St. Joseph in Tensas Parish, Rayville in Richland Parish, and New Orleans.

== Unseating Sam Little ==
Morris won the state representative position in the general election held on November 19, 2011, when he unseated fellow Republican Sam Little, a retired farmer, originally from Bastrop in Morehouse Parish. Morris polled 5,005 votes (59.1 percent) to Little's 3,463 ballots (40.9 percent). In the campaign for the heavily redistricted seat, Little and Morris accused each other of engaging in negative campaigning. Morris is a graduate of Louisiana State University and the Louisiana State University Law Center, both in Baton Rouge.

Morris led the three-candidate field in the primary held on October 22, with 5,078 votes (42.6 percent). Little trailed with 4,384 ballots (36.7 percent). A third Republican, Michael Echols, held the remaining but critical 2,471 votes (20.7 percent). Echols ran without opposition in the 2019 primary to choose Morris' House successor. From 1991 to 2008, the District 14 seat was held by the Democrat Charles R. McDonald of Bastrop in Morehouse Parish.

== Senate tenure ==
In 2026, Morris authored, pre filed, then presented Senate Bills 116, 121, and 130 to the Senate and Governmental Affairs Committee. The bills were legislation to redraw Louisiana districts after the U.S. Supreme Court struck down the state's 2024 map as an illegal racial gerrymander. SB116 proposed eliminating both majority-Black congressional districts, creating a 5-1 or competitive 4–2 majority Republican split. SB121 proposed eliminating one majority-Black district (leaving only District 2), a map that ultimately advanced and was signed into law. SB130 proposed eliminating one majority-Black district while structuring the remaining district differently (keeping only District 6).

== Legislative ratings, record and issues ==
In May 2017, Morris opposed a plan in the House Ways and Means Committee introduced by his Republican colleague, Rob Shadoin of Ruston. The plan collectively would have raised taxes on businesses and lowered them for what Shadoin said would constitute 90 percent of individual taxpayers. When his measure was killed in committee, Shadoin said, "You can kiss tax reform goodbye." Four individual bills were combined into one on the advice of Shadoin's Democratic ally, Major Thibaut of New Roads. Morris stated that the opponents of Shadoin's bill managed to stop the legislation on the premise that the measure "would not help the state's fiscal situation and would in fact make it worse." He added that it would have made the tax code more progressive by increasing taxes on higher income earners, while eliminating the deduction for federal income tax. The committee didn't see the benefit from a set of bills that made the state fiscal situation worse in the name of purported tax reform."

Louisiana House of Representatives
Preceded by Sam Little	Louisiana State Representative for District 14 (Morehouse and Ouachita parishes); John Clyde "Jay" Morris, III; 2012–2020	Succeeded by Michael Echols
Louisiana State Senate
Preceded by James R. Fannin	Louisiana State Senator for District 35; John Clyde "Jay" Morris, III; 2020–	Succeeded by Incumbent
