= 2019 Louisiana House of Representatives election =

- November 5, 2019

All 105 seats in the Louisiana House of Representatives 53 seats needed for a majority
| | Majority party | Minority party | Third party |
|---|---|---|---|
| Leader | Taylor Barras (retired) | Robert Johnson (term-limited) | Joseph A. Marino III |
| Party | Republican | Democratic | Independent |
| Leader since | January 11, 2016 | March 19, 2018 | July 1, 2016 |
| Leader's seat | 48th district | 28th district | 85th district |
| Seats before | 60 | 39 | 5 |
| Seats won | 68 | 35 | 2 |
| Seat change | ▲8 | ▼3 | ▼3 |
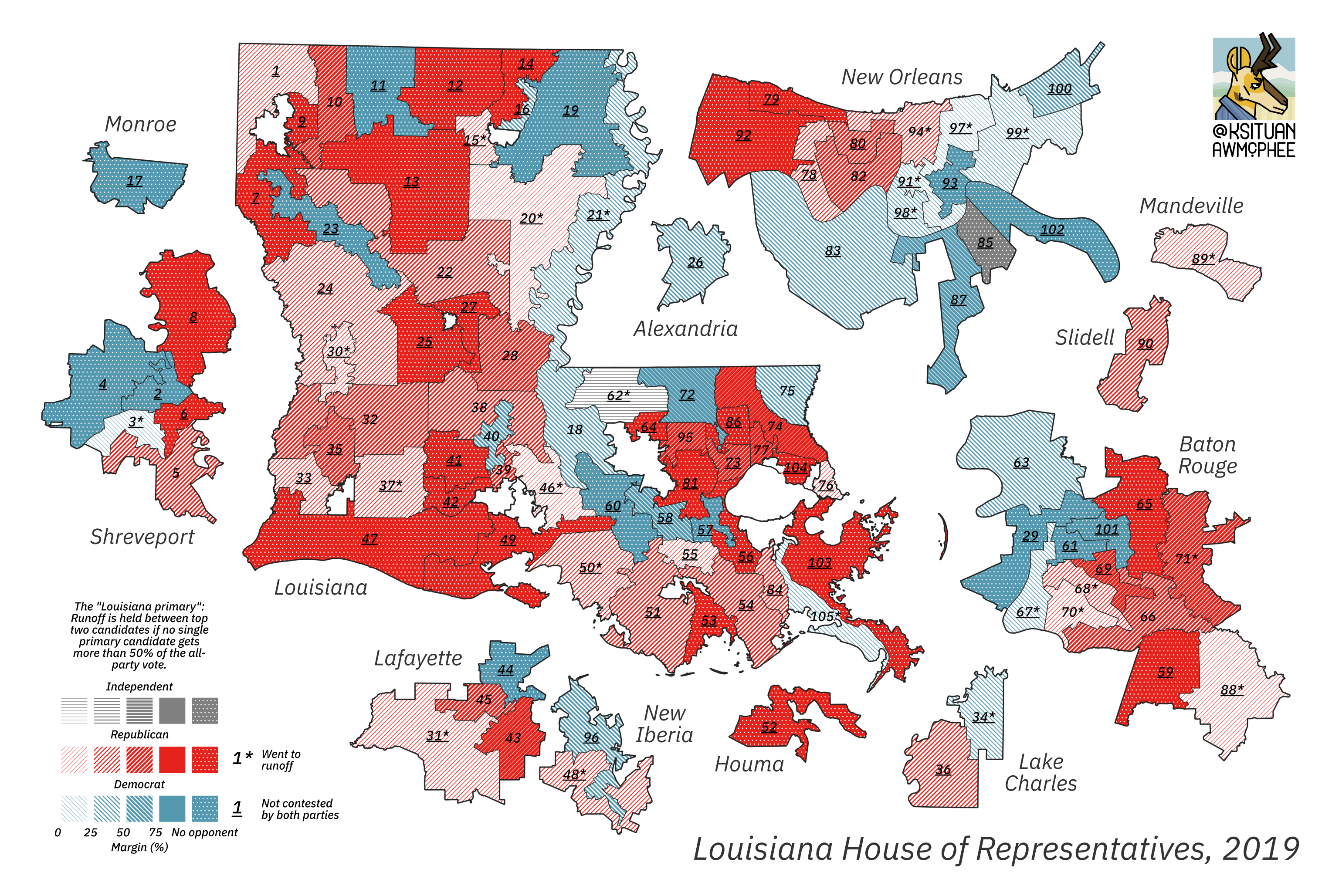
- Results: Republican; Democratic
Speaker before election
Tayler Barras
Republican
Elected Speaker
Clay Shexnayder
Republican

The 2019 Louisiana House of Representatives election was held on November 5, 2019. All 105 seats in the Louisiana House of Representatives were up for election to four-year terms. It was held concurrently with elections for all statewide offices and the Louisiana State Senate.

== Background ==
In the 2015 state legislature elections, Republicans kept their majorities in both chambers, 61 in the House and 25 in the Senate.

== Overview ==
↓
| 68 | 2 | 35 |
| Republican | (Note: There were two Independents.) | Democratic |

== See also ==
- 2019 United States state legislative elections
- 2019 Louisiana State Senate election
