= John Illg =

American politician

Member of the Louisiana House of Representatives from the 78th district
- Incumbent
- Assumed office January 13, 2020
- Preceded by: Kirk Talbot

Personal details
- Party: Republican
- Education: Louisiana State University (BA)

John R. Illg Jr. is an American politician serving as a member of the Louisiana House of Representatives from the 78th district. He is commonly known by the nickname "Big John" in reference to his weight of 470 lbs.

== Political career ==
Illg first ran for the 78th district seat in 2007 but was defeated by Kirk Talbot. In 2019, he ran again and successfully secured the seat by defeating William Wallis, replacing Talbot, who had transitioned to the Louisiana State Senate. Illg officially assumed office on January 13, 2020. He ran unopposed in 2023, winning re-election without opposition.
