= Kirk Talbot =

American politician (born 1969)

Member of the Louisiana Senate from the 10th district
- Incumbent
- Assumed office January 13, 2020
- Preceded by: Daniel Martiny

Member of the Louisiana House of Representatives from the 78th district
- In office January 2008 – January 13, 2020
- Preceded by: Shirley Bowler
- Succeeded by: John Illg

Personal details
- Born: Michael Kirk Talbot; November 18, 1969 (age 56) Metairie, Louisiana, U.S.
- Party: Republican
- Spouse: Julie Strong
- Children: 2
- Education: University of Mississippi (BBA)

Michael Kirk Talbot (born November 18, 1969) is an American politician from Louisiana. A Republican, Talbot has represented the 10th district in the Louisiana State Senate since 2020, and previously represented the 78th district in the Louisiana House of Representatives between 2008 and 2020.

== Education ==
Talbot attended Saint Martin's Episcopal School in his native Metairie in Jefferson Parish and holds an undergraduate degree in business administration from the University of Mississippi at Oxford.

== Political career ==
First elected in the 2007 general election against Harahan Councilwoman Tiffany Scot Wilken to replace the term-limited District 78 Representative Shirley D. Bowler, a Republican who had served since 1992.

== Cuts to higher education ==
Talbot is a proponent of reduced spending by Louisiana government, specifically naming higher education as an area ripe for cutting. In a June 15, 2009, letter to the editor of the Times-Picayune (New Orleans), Talbot explicitly opposed 2009 Louisiana Senate Bill 335 by Senator Lydia P. Jackson of Shreveport and criticized the increased rate of state spending for higher education over the last 10 years; Jackson's bill was an attempt to delay a state income-tax reduction as a means of forestalling a 15.4-percent budget cut to Louisiana's public universities. The income-tax reduction was in a 2008 statute intended to accelerate reversal of the Stelly Plan, named for its author, former Republican State Representative Vic Stelly of Lake Charles. Talbot supported the reversal in his 2007 campaign in which he also endorsed private school vouchers. Talbot's letter was symptomatic of a larger struggle over the budget in the Louisiana Legislature. On the next day (June 16, 2009) and without naming Talbot, a letter from Louisiana State Senate president Joel Chaisson appeared in the Times-Picayune. Chaisson asserted there was "a misguided attempt by the House to protect their member projects"; the representatives were "allowing their member projects to go forward even if higher education is not properly funded" according to Chaisson.

== Personal life ==
Talbot and his wife, the former Julie Strong, have a daughter and a son. The Talbots, part owners of Lucky Dogs Inc., are involved in various business-related organizations in Jefferson Parish. For one year in the aftermath of Hurricane Katrina, Talbot worked for Fannie Mae. The Talbots attend Saint Martin's Episcopal Church.
