= Franklin Foil =

American politician

Franklin Johnson Foil
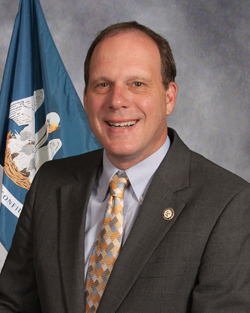

Member of the Louisiana Senate from the 16th district
- Incumbent
- Assumed office January 13, 2020
- Preceded by: Dan Claitor

Member of the Louisiana House of Representatives from the 70th district
- In office January 14, 2008 – January 13, 2020
- Preceded by: Carl Crane
- Succeeded by: Barbara Reich Freiberg

Personal details
- Born: October 31, 1964 (age 61) Baton Rouge, Louisiana, U.S.
- Party: Republican
- Spouse: Tanja Dee Vanhook Foil
- Children: 3
- Education: Louisiana State University; Loyola University New Orleans
- Occupation: Attorney

Franklin Johnson Foil (born October 31, 1964) is a Republican member of the Louisiana State Senate for the 16th district, serving since 2020. He formerly represented the 70th district in the Louisiana House of Representatives from 2008 until 2020.

== Early life ==
Foil was born and reared in Baton Rouge, as one of two sons of Frank Foil and the former Judith Johnson. As a high school student, he was a member of the National Honor Society and earned varsity letters in football, track, tennis, and cross country. He achieved the rank of Eagle Scout in 1980. In 1982 he was selected to attend the Louisiana Boys State Program, serving as a counselor for the next 5 years then as a board member for 10 years. He is also a U.S. Navy veteran, a captain in the Navy Reserve Judge Advocate General's Corps, and has served as Judge Pro Tempore for the Baton Rouge City Court. He has been inducted into the Louisiana State University Cadets of the Ole War Skule Hall of Honor and is the recipient of the Rear Admiral Hugh Howell Award of Excellence for Outstanding Senior Officer. Upon his retirement from the US Navy in 2021, he was awarded the Legion of Merit Award by the President of the United States for "superior performance of duties culminated during his thirty years of honorable and dedicated military service".

== Election history ==
In his first bid for political office, Foil defeated Metro Councilman Pat Culbertson in the general election held on November 17, 2007: 5,399 (53 percent) to 4,809 (47 percent).

Foil was easily reelected in the primary election held on October 22, 2011. He defeated the Independent Greg Baldwin, 6,947 votes (77.4 percent) to 2,033 (22.6 percent). He won again in 2015 by a similar margin, 8,401 votes (74.4 percent) to 2,891 (25.6 percent) for the Democratic candidate, Shamaka Schumake. He was elected to the Louisiana State Senate in 2019 and re-elected without opposition in 2023.

== Legislation ==
In this first legislative session, Foil passed legislation requiring insurance companies to cover medical treatment for children on the autism spectrum. In 2018, Foil passed legislation to establish a tax-free savings account for tuition for K-12 education. Foil was appointed head of the Homeland Security Committee in 2008 and is also currently serving as vice chair of the House Appropriations Committee.

== Notes ==
Preceded by Carl Crane	Louisiana State Representative for District 70 (East Baton Rouge Parish); 2008–2020	Succeeded by Barbara Reich Freiberg
Preceded by Dan Claitor	Louisiana State Senator for District 16; 2020–	Succeeded by Incumbent
