= Reid Falconer =

American politician

Ramsey Reid Falconer

Louisiana State Representative for District 89 (St. Tammany Parish)
- In office January 2016 – January 2020
- Preceded by: Timothy Burns
- Succeeded by: Richard Nelson

Personal details
- Born: December 26, 1956 (age 69)
- Party: Republican
- Spouse(s): Celeste G. Falconer, 1980
- Education: Louisiana State University

Ramsey Reid Falconer, known as Reid Falconer (born December 26, 1956), is a former Republican member of the Louisiana House of Representatives for District 89 in St. Tammany Parish in suburban New Orleans, Louisiana. On January 11, 2016, he succeeded the term-limited Republican Representative Timothy Burns. In 2019, he ran for District 11 in the Louisiana State Senate, but lost to fellow Republican Patrick McMath.

In the October 24, 2015 primary election, Falconer, with 7,135 votes (66 percent), defeated another Republican candidate, Pat Phillips, who polled 3,683 votes (34 percent). Phillips had also unsuccessfully opposed Tim Burns in the 2011 primary.

== 2019 lawsuit ==
Falconer is currently suing FanDroppings LLC, owners of the TigerDroppings website. Falconer is requesting information on the website's user posting allegedly fake information involving a criminal complaint at Southeastern University.

Louisiana House of Representatives
Preceded by Timothy Burns	Louisiana State Representative for District 89 (St. Tammany Parish); 2016 – 2020	Succeeded by Richard Nelson
