= Patrick Connick =

American politician (born 1961)

John Patrick Connick

Member of the Louisiana Senate from the 8th district
- Incumbent
- Assumed office January 13, 2020
- Preceded by: John Alario

Member of the Louisiana House of Representatives from the 84th district
- In office January 2008 – January 2020
- Preceded by: N. J. Damico
- Succeeded by: Timothy Kerner

Personal details
- Born: March 1961 (age 65)
- Party: Republican
- Relatives: Harry Connick Sr. (uncle); Harry Connick Jr. (cousin)
- Education: Loyola University New Orleans
- Profession: Attorney

John Patrick Connick (born March 1961), is an American attorney from Marrero, Louisiana. A Republican, Connick has represented the 8th district in the Louisiana State Senate since 2020. He previously represented the 84th district in the Louisiana House of Representatives from 2008 until 2020.

The youngest of eight children born to Paul and Betty Connick, his elder brother is Jefferson Parish District Attorney Paul Connick. He is a nephew of former Orleans Parish District Attorney Harry Connick Sr., and a first cousin of actor/singer Harry Connick Jr.

In 1979, Connick graduated from Archbishop Shaw High School. He received his Bachelor of Arts degree in 1983 from Loyola University in New Orleans. Ten years later, in 1993, Connick received his Juris Doctor degree from Loyola University New Orleans College of Law.

For his first term in the House, Connick, who had no previous political experience, ran without opposition in the nonpartisan blanket primary held on October 20, 2007, for the seat vacated by the three-term Democrat N.J. Damico. He serves on these House committees: (1) Appropriations, (2) Governmental Affairs, (3) Judiciary, (4) Executive, and (5) Joint Legislative Committee on the Budget.

In 2010, Connick supported the conservative Louisiana Family Forum 80 percent of the time, compared to 100 percent in 2009. He received 100 percent from the Louisiana Association of Business and Industry in 2010 but only 58 percent in 2009. He was rated 100% in 2009 by the Louisiana Right to Life Federation.

In June 2011, Connick obtained House approval of a resolution authorizing the state legislative auditor, Darryl Purpera, to examine possible improper uses of toll revenues in metropolitan New Orleans. Connick has been a critic of certain spending practices of the Crescent City Connection, a section of the Louisiana Department of Transportation and Development.

For his second term in the House, Connick again ran unopposed. He resides in Harvey, a census-designated place in Jefferson Parish.

In 2019, Connick ran for District 8 in the Louisiana State Senate to succeed term-limited Senate President John Alario. Connick received no competition from either major party and was elected unopposed.

Louisiana House of Representatives
| Preceded by N. J. Damico | Louisiana State Representative for District 84; John Patrick Connick; 2008–2020 | Succeeded by Timothy Kerner |
| Preceded by John Alario | Louisiana State Senator for District 8 John Patrick Connick; 2020– | Succeeded by Incumbent |
