= Mike Reese (Louisiana politician) =

American politician and businessman

Member of the Louisiana Senate from the 30th district
- Incumbent
- Assumed office January 13, 2020
- Preceded by: John R. Smith

Personal details
- Party: Republican
- Spouse: Morgan
- Children: 2
- Education: University of Louisiana at Monroe (BS)
- Website: Campaign website

Mike Reese is an American politician and businessman from the state of Louisiana. A Republican, Reese has represented the Louisiana State Senate's 30th district, covering much of the state's western border with Texas, since 2020. Reese was first elected in 2019 with 51% of the vote, succeeding term-limited fellow Republican John R. Smith.
