= Eric LaFleur =

American politician

Member of the Louisiana Senate from the 28th district
- In office 2008–2020
- Preceded by: Donald E. Hines
- Succeeded by: Heather Cloud

Member of the Louisiana House of Representatives from the 38th district
- In office 2000–2007
- Preceded by: Dirk Deville
- Succeeded by: Bernard LeBas

Personal details
- Born: March 28, 1964 (age 62) Ville Platte, Louisiana, U.S.
- Party: Democratic
- Spouse: Julie Morein
- Education: Louisiana State University, Baton Rouge (BA); Tulane University (JD)

Eric LaFleur (born March 28, 1964) is an American attorney and politician. A Democrat, LaFleur is a former member of the Louisiana State Senate for the 28th district, serving from 2008 until 2020. Earlier he was a member of the Louisiana House of Representatives for District 38 (Evangeline and St. Landry parishes) from 2000 to 2008. He was first elected without opposition to an open seat vacated by Dirk Deville. He was re-elected four years later in 2003 with 81 percent of the vote.

== Personal life ==
LaFleur is the son of Dwight LaFleur, a lifelong resident of Ville Platte. He was formerly a merchant and served as an Air Force fighter pilot. His mother, the former Flo Brown, was reared on a rice farm in Chatgaignier, Louisiana, and became a registered nurse. LaFleur attended local schools. He graduated from Louisiana State University in Baton Rouge, having earned a Bachelor of Arts with three majors, French, Economics, and History. He earned his J.D. degree from Tulane University Law School in New Orleans in 1991.

LaFleur married Julie D. Morein, who was born and reared just outside Ville Platte. Her father is a farmer and her mother a teacher. She graduated from Louisiana State University magna cum laude and earned her master's degree from the University of South Alabama at Mobile, Alabama. She is a physician's assistant at St. Frances Cabrini Hospital in Alexandria, Louisiana. Additionally, she is a Louisiana licensed Nursing Home Administrator. The couple resides in Ville Platte with their three children: Atticus, Amélie, and Alistair.

== Career ==
LaFleur is a managing partner in the law firm of LaFleur & Laborde. The firm has offices in New Orleans, Baton Rouge, Ville Platte, and Lafayette, Louisiana. His legal practice is split between transactional work, namely, residential, commercial and public finance, and general civil litigation. He is a Red Book listed bond attorney.

LaFleur also serves as the president and chief financial officer for a health care company; it employs over one hundred (100) people and provides primary and ancillary health care services to long-term care and long-term acute care patients. Before entering private practice, LaFleur served as a felony prosecutor under District Attorney Harry Connick in New Orleans and for the Louisiana Department of Justice under former Attorney General of Louisiana Richard Ieyoub. During his years as prosecutor, LaFleur handled in excess of 1,000 felony cases, including 50 plus jury trials.

== Louisiana Legislature ==
LaFleur won the Senate seat on November 17, 2007, when he defeated in a runoff contest, Donald Newton, a Democrat from Bunkie. Newton's grandfather, Donald E. Hines, a physician and the Democratic Senate President from 2004 to 2008, retired from the legislature.

District 28 includes virtually all of the parishes of Evangeline, Allen, and Avoyelles, along with parts of St. Landry and Acadia. Senator LaFleur served as Chairman of the Senate Finance Committee and the Joint Legislative Committee on the Budget. In addition, he served as a member of the Judiciary B and Insurance Committees. LaFleur was selected by the Independent Insurance Agents and Brokers of Louisiana to serve as their representative on the board of directors of Louisiana Citizens Insurance Company, a quasi public insurance company serving as the provider of last resort for homeowner's insurance in Louisiana. He serves as chairman of the company's litigation committee, and as the president of the Louisiana section of French speaking legislators known as the Assemblée parlementaire de la francophonie.

== Issues ==
Recent legislation spearheaded and passed by LaFleur included the "Castle" doctrine legislation, House Bill 1097 backed by the National Rifle Association (NRA), that provided civil immunity to victims of crime who lawfully use deadly force to protect themselves and their families against a violent attack.

He promoted and passed ethics reform legislation prohibiting fundraisers during legislative sessions and the application of ethics reporting rules for those people lobbying or trying to influence non-elected executive level employees. In 2007, he and fellow Representatives, Michael Jackson and Don Cazayoux, filed additional ethics reform measures requiring income disclosure for members of the Louisiana House of Representatives. House Bill 723, provided for the most comprehensive ethics reform package in recent Louisiana legislative history. In sum, the bill would have "[r]equire[d] legislators and candidates for the state legislature to disclose certain income”. While the comprehensive legislation failed to pass, it helped shape the gubernatorial campaign in 2007 as both candidates Bobby Jindal and Walter Boasso adopted it into their campaigns. LaFleur was the author of other bills restricting executive branch lobbying, prohibiting political fundraising activities during session, and requiring legislative oversight and accountability from the governing boards of state retirement systems.

LaFleur is a strong proponent for the preservation of the French language and Cajun and Creole culture in Louisiana. LaFleur filed legislation to reconstitute the board of the CODOFIL and provided that board with new missions and objectives, including the development of at least one French immersion school in each of the 23 parishes that make up Acadiana on or before 2016. He promoted the adoption of an incentive programs for the development of new or the expansion of existing immersion schools. The Louisiana Board of Elementary and Secondary Education adopted an incentive program at LaFleur's urging in 2011. The program became known as Renaissance Louisiane , adopted from a similar program used in Manitoba. LaFleur opposes abortion and gun control, and was endorsed by the Louisiana Association of Business and Industry in his last two elections.

In January 2016, Senate President John Alario of Westwego appointed LaFleur chairman of the pivotal Senate Finance Committee.
