= John Alario =

American politician

President of the Louisiana Senate
- In office January 9, 2012 – January 13, 2020
- Preceded by: Joel Chaisson
- Succeeded by: Page Cortez

Member of the Louisiana Senate from the 8th district
- In office January 14, 2008 – January 13, 2020
- Preceded by: Chris Ullo
- Succeeded by: Patrick Connick

Speaker of the Louisiana House of Representatives
- In office January 1992 – January 1996
- Preceded by: Jimmy Dimos
- Succeeded by: Hunt Downer
- In office January 1984 – January 1988
- Preceded by: John Hainkel
- Succeeded by: Jimmy Dimos

Member of the Louisiana House of Representatives from the 83rd district
- In office January 1972 – January 14, 2008
- Preceded by: ???
- Succeeded by: Robert Billiot

Personal details
- Born: September 15, 1943 (age 82)
- Party: Democratic (Before 2010); Republican (2010–present)
- Spouse(s): Ree Williamson (Deceased 2006) Trina Edwards (m. 2023)
- Children: 4
- Education: Southeastern Louisiana University (BA)

John A. Alario Jr. (born September 15, 1943) is an American politician from Louisiana who represented the 8th district in the Louisiana State Senate from 2008 until 2020. Currently a Republican, Alario previously represented District 83 in the Louisiana House of Representatives as a Democrat between 1971 and 2007. Alario was term-limited from the Senate in 2019, and chose not to seek another office.

Alario was the President of the Louisiana State Senate, serving in that role between 2012 and 2020; he is also a former two-term Speaker of the Louisiana House of Representatives. He is the first politician in Louisiana history to hold both roles for two terms each, as well as the longest-serving legislator in state history.

== Early career ==
A graduate of West Jefferson High School and Southeastern Louisiana University, Alario worked as a teacher and accountant prior to entering politics. He has been the owner of John A. Alario, Jr. Tax Income Service since 1972.

== Electoral history ==
=== Louisiana House of Representatives ===
Alario was first elected as a Democrat to the Louisiana House of Representatives in 1971, representing the 83rd district in suburban Jefferson Parish.

=== Speaker of the House ===
In 1984, Alario was chosen to be Speaker of the Louisiana House of Representatives under Governor Edwin Edwards. He lost that title under Governor Buddy Roemer in 1988, but won it back in 1992 to serve another 4-year term. Alario was considered to be a prominent political ally of Edwards, with Edwards twice selecting him to serve as Speaker.

=== Louisiana State Senate ===
Alario was elected in 2007 to the 6th district in the Louisiana State Senate, defeating Democratic opponent John Roberts 63-37%. In 2010, Alario switched to the Republican Party due to the national direction of the Democratic Party and the increasingly-Republican politics of Louisiana.

Alario was re-elected unopposed in 2011 and 2015. He was term-limited in 2019. Though there was speculation that he would run for his former House of Representatives seat, Alario declined and chose to retire from politics.

=== Senate President ===
Alario was chosen as President of the Louisiana State Senate under Governor Bobby Jindal in 2011, and served a second term under Governor John Bel Edwards. He is the second Republican Senate President since Reconstruction.

== Personal life ==
Alario's first wife, Alba "Ree" Williamson Alario, died in 2006; the couple had four children – Jan Marie, John, Christopher, and Kevin – and seven grandchildren.

He remarried in 2023 to Trina Scott Edwards, who is the widow of former Governor Edwin Edwards.

Political offices
Preceded by John Hainkel	Speaker of the Louisiana House of Representatives; 1984–1988	Succeeded by Jimmy Dimos
Preceded by Jimmy Dimos	Speaker of the Louisiana House of Representatives; 1992–1996	Succeeded by Hunt Downer
Preceded by Joel Chaisson	President of the Louisiana Senate; 2012–2020	Succeeded by Page Cortez
