= Patrick McMath =

American politician, businessman, and attorney

Member of the Louisiana Senate from the 11th district
- Incumbent
- Assumed office January 13, 2020
- Preceded by: Jack Donahue

Personal details
- Party: Republican
- Spouse: Jayne
- Children: 4
- Education: Louisiana State University (BA); Loyola University New Orleans College of Law (JD)
- Website: Campaign website

Patrick McMath is an American politician, businessman, and attorney from the state of Louisiana. A Republican, McMath has represented the 11th district in the Louisiana State Senate since 2020.

Prior to serving in the Senate, McMath worked as an assistant district attorney and started several businesses. In 2017, he was elected as an at-large city councilman in his home of Covington. Two years later, McMath ran for State Senate, defeating State Representative Reid Falconer in the runoff election with 56% of the vote.
