= Steven Pylant =

American politician

Member of the Louisiana House of Representatives from the 20th district
- In office January 2012 – January 13, 2020
- Preceded by: Noble Ellington
- Succeeded by: Neil Riser

Personal details
- Born: Steven Everett Pylant; November 25, 1954 (age 71) Franklin Parish, Louisiana, U.S.
- Party: Republican
- Education: Northeast Louisiana University

Steven Everett Pylant (born November 25, 1954) is an American politician. A member of the Republican Party, he served in the Louisiana House of Representatives from 2012 to 2020.

== Life and career ==
Pylant was born in Franklin Parish, Louisiana, the son of Cecil Everett Pylant and Barbara Jean Netherland. He attended Winnsboro High School and Northeast Louisiana University.

Pylant served as sheriff of Franklin Parish, Louisiana from 1996 to 2012. After his service as sheriff, he served in the Louisiana House of Representatives from 2012 to 2020.
