= Heather Cloud =

American politician, businesswoman, and educator

Heather Miley Cloud

Member of the Louisiana Senate from the 28th district
- Incumbent
- Assumed office January 13, 2020
- Preceded by: Eric LaFleur

Personal details
- Party: Republican
- Spouse: Jody
- Children: 2
- Website: Campaign website

Heather Miley Cloud is an American politician, businesswoman, and educator from Louisiana. A Republican, Cloud has represented the 28th district in the Louisiana State Senate since 2020.

== Political career ==
On October 2, 2010, Cloud was elected mayor of Turkey Creek with 121 votes, while Kurry W. Stewart received 55 votes.

On November 4, 2014, Bert Campbell was elected as the mayor of Turkey Creek, receiving 110 votes compared to Cloud's 106 votes. Cloud subsequently filed a lawsuit contesting the election results, claiming Campbell had paid residents for their votes. She provided four signed affidavits from voters who stated they had been offered money in exchange for their votes. In a written statement, Cloud expressed her commitment to integrity in the electoral process: "I am a strong advocate for what is right, and I value my constitutional right to vote. Voter fraud is a widespread issue that is not addressed nearly enough in our society. What a privilege it is to have the right to vote, and what a privilege it is to live in a democratic society, but when elections are bought, democracy is abandoned and our right to vote is hijacked. We the people have to take this illegal practice seriously now to protect our future."

Campbell denied the allegations against him. Judge Joel Davis dismissed Cloud's lawsuit without hearing witness testimony, citing allegations of witness intimidation. Cloud appealed to the Louisiana Supreme Court, and the Third Circuit Court of Appeal reversed the decision. Judge Davis once again dismissed the lawsuit, stating that his court in Ville Platte did not have the authority to change the election results or order new elections. However, he noted there was evidence suggesting that votes were bought, which is a violation of state law.

Cloud subsequently appealed to the Third Circuit Court of Appeals in Lake Charles. The appellate court determined that the evidence presented during the hearing in Ville Platte indicated that the four disputed votes could be invalidated. As a result, the mayoral election could be declared a tie, and a new election should be scheduled. In the new election held in February 2015, Cloud won with 134 votes to 118. State Senator Elbert Guillory was one of Cloud's attorneys during the trial.

Cloud served as the mayor from 2011 until 2019. In 2018, Cloud ran in a special election for Louisiana Secretary of State but finished in 8th place, receiving only 5% of the vote.

In July 2019, Cloud announced her candidacy to succeed term-limited Democratic State Senator Eric LaFleur. That October, Cloud defeated Democratic State Representatives Robert Johnson and Bernard LeBas with 63% of the vote.

In 2023, Cloud introduced Senate Bill 7, which requires libraries to implement a card system. This system allows parents to prevent their children from checking out books deemed inappropriate. Additionally, libraries must adopt policy language that restricts minors' access to materials that describe "sexual conduct," as defined in the bill.

The legislation also establishes new standards for reviewing materials, allowing local library boards to determine what is considered sexually explicit. If libraries fail to comply with these requirements, the law prohibits the State Bond Commission from approving financial packages for any construction projects that would benefit those libraries. Furthermore, the law permits, but does not mandate, local governments to withhold funding from libraries. The Louisiana Library Association issued a statement in response to the bill because it advanced from a state Senate committee before any opponents could speak out against it. The bill was returned to the committee to allow the opposition to present their views. Eleven members of the public, including librarians and library board members, opposed the bill. However, it advanced to the Senate again, and Governor John Bel Edwards signed SB 7 into law.

In April 2024, Cloud introduced Senate Bill 482, which includes a provision to exempt certain records from public records law. Specifically, the bill aims to protect documents that contain advisory opinions, recommendations, and deliberations related to the formulation of governmental decisions and policies. Cloud argued that while the public has the right to access records of public meetings and the outcomes of governmental deliberations, they should not have access to the deliberations themselves unless these occur during a public meeting.

However, opponents pointed out that the bill, in its current form, is unconstitutional and would likely be overturned if passed. They also noted that the legal fees associated with defending the bill could result in wasted taxpayer money. In May 2024, the bill was returned to the calendar, subject to call.

In March 2024, Cloud introduced Senate Bill 260, which aims to reduce the number of commercial truck permits required by the state. In May, Governor Jeff Landry signed the bill into law.

In November 2024, Cloud introduced Senate Bill 2, which sought to lift restrictions on the types of crimes for which individuals under the age of 17 can be sentenced as adults. The Louisiana House reviewed this proposal and mandated that it receive statewide voter approval before it could become law. Approximately 70 mental health professionals and educators in Louisiana signed a letter opposing the bill. Among the four amendments on the ballot for the March 29, 2025, election, Amendment 3—pertaining to the adult prosecution of juveniles—faced the most significant rejection, losing by over 180,000 votes (66%).

== Business ventures ==
Cloud and her husband operate a trucking business, Jody Cloud Trucking. They previously owned Miss Sue's Café, which is now closed. Her husband's trucking company held a contract worth over $500,000 with the Evangeline Parish Police Jury, as well as additional agreements with the Evangeline Parish Solid Waste, the Allen Parish Police Jury, and the Village of Turkey Creek.
