= Jimmy Dimos =

American politician (1938–2023)

Jimmy N. Dimos (October 18, 1938 – May 18, 2023) was a Yugoslavian-born American judge and politician in Louisiana. He emigrated from SR Macedonia, Socialist Federal Republic Yugoslavia (modern-day North Macedonia) as a child in 1951, joining his father in the U.S. He was a member of the Eastern Orthodox Church growing up. He graduated from Neville High School in Monroe, Louisiana. He attended the University of Louisiana at Monroe and Tulane University.

Dimos served in the Louisiana House of Representatives from 1976 to 1999. He represented Ouachita Parish. During the governorship of Buddy Roemer, Dimos was speaker of the house. He served as a judge of the Louisiana Fourth Judicial District Court bench from 1999 to 2007. In 2017, Dimos was inducted into the Louisiana Political Museum and Hall of Fame and the Louisiana Justice Hall of Fame.

Dimos died on May 18, 2023, at the age of 84.
