= Louisiana's 35th State Senate district =

American legislative district

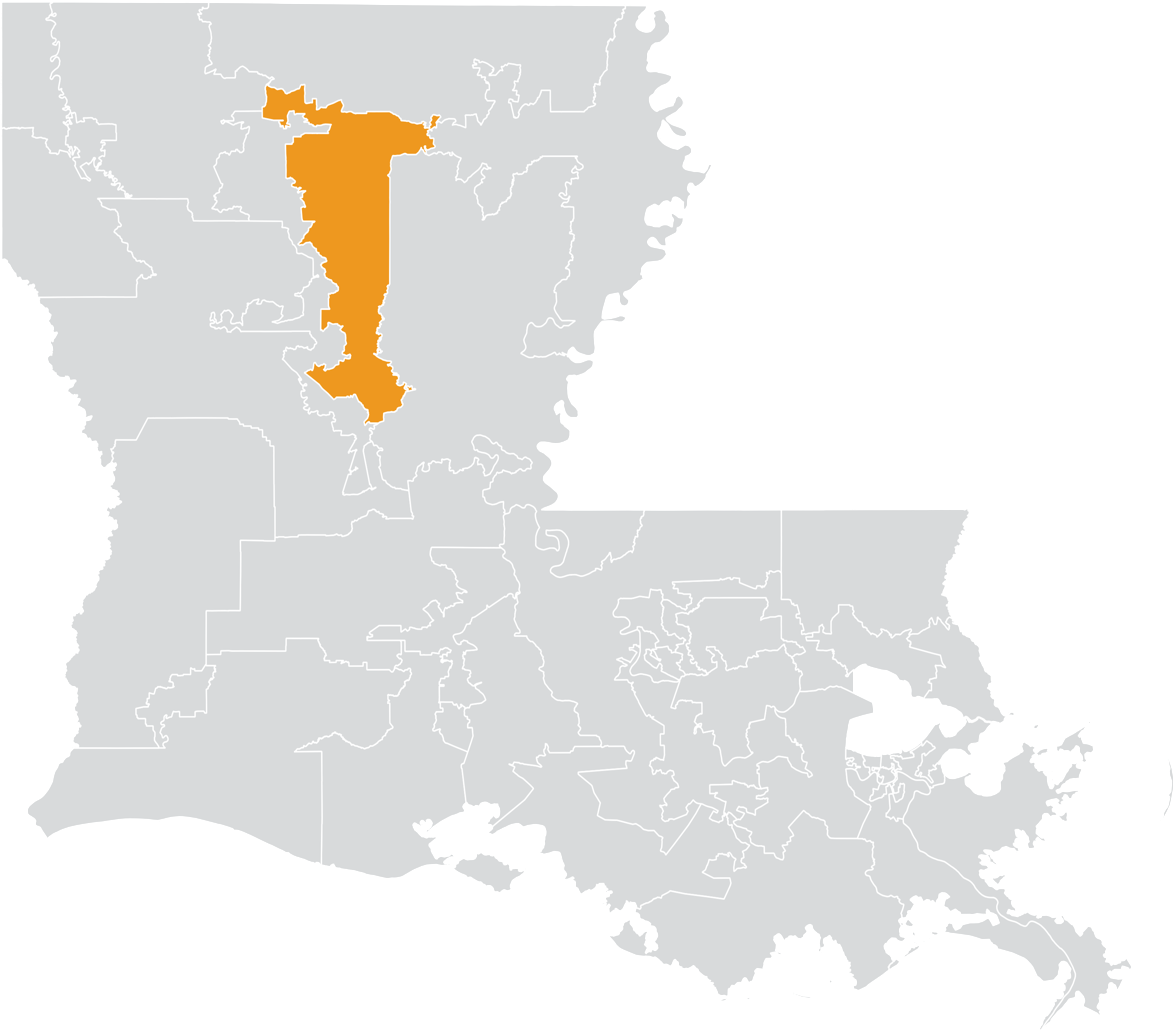
Senator
Jay Morris; R–Monroe
- Registration: 48.1% Republican; 24.8% Democratic; 27.1% No party preference
- Demographics: 82% White; 12% Black; 3% Hispanic; 1% Asian; 2% Other
- Population (2019): 112,012
- Registered voters: 71,465

Louisiana's 35th State Senate district is one of 39 districts in the Louisiana State Senate. It has been represented by Republican Jay Morris since 2020.

== Geography ==
District 35 covers parts of Grant, Jackson, Lincoln, Ouachita, Rapides, and Winn Parishes in North Louisiana, including some or all of Monroe, West Monroe, Bawcomville, Brownsville, Claiborne, Ruston, Hodge, Ball, and Pineville.

The district is located entirely within Louisiana's 5th congressional district, and overlaps with the 11th, 12th, 13th, 14th, 15th, 17th, 22nd, and 27th districts of the Louisiana House of Representatives.

== Recent election results ==
Louisiana uses a jungle primary system. If no candidate receives 50% in the first round of voting, when all candidates appear on the same ballot regardless of party, the top-two finishers advance to a runoff election.

=== 2019 ===
2019 Louisiana State Senate election, District 35
Primary election
Party	Candidate	Votes	%
Republican	James R. Fannin (incumbent)	12,559	38.6
Republican	Jay Morris	11,782	36.3
Republican	Matt Parker	8,154	25.1
Total votes		32,495	100
General election
Republican	Jay Morris	18,167	50.4
Republican	James R. Fannin (incumbent)	17,894	49.6
Total votes		36,061	100
Republican hold			

=== 2015 ===
2015 Louisiana State Senate election, District 35
Party	Candidate	Votes	%
Republican	James R. Fannin	13,430	52.9
Republican	Stewart Cathey, Jr.	11,956	47.1
Total votes		25,386	100
Republican hold			

=== 2011 ===
2011 Louisiana State Senate election, District 35
Party	Candidate	Votes	%
Republican	Robert Kostelka (incumbent)	14,644	52.0
Republican	Jeff Guerriero	13,494	48.0
Total votes		28,138	100
Republican hold			

=== Federal and statewide results ===
Year	Office	Results
2020	President	Trump 81.5–16.8%
2019	Governor (runoff)	Rispone 73.1–26.9%
2016	President	Trump 81.4–15.1%
2015	Governor (runoff)	Vitter 67.0–33.0%
2014	Senate (runoff)	Cassidy 81.5–18.5%
2012	President	Romney 81.7–16.6%
