= Louisiana's 11th State Senate district =

American legislative district

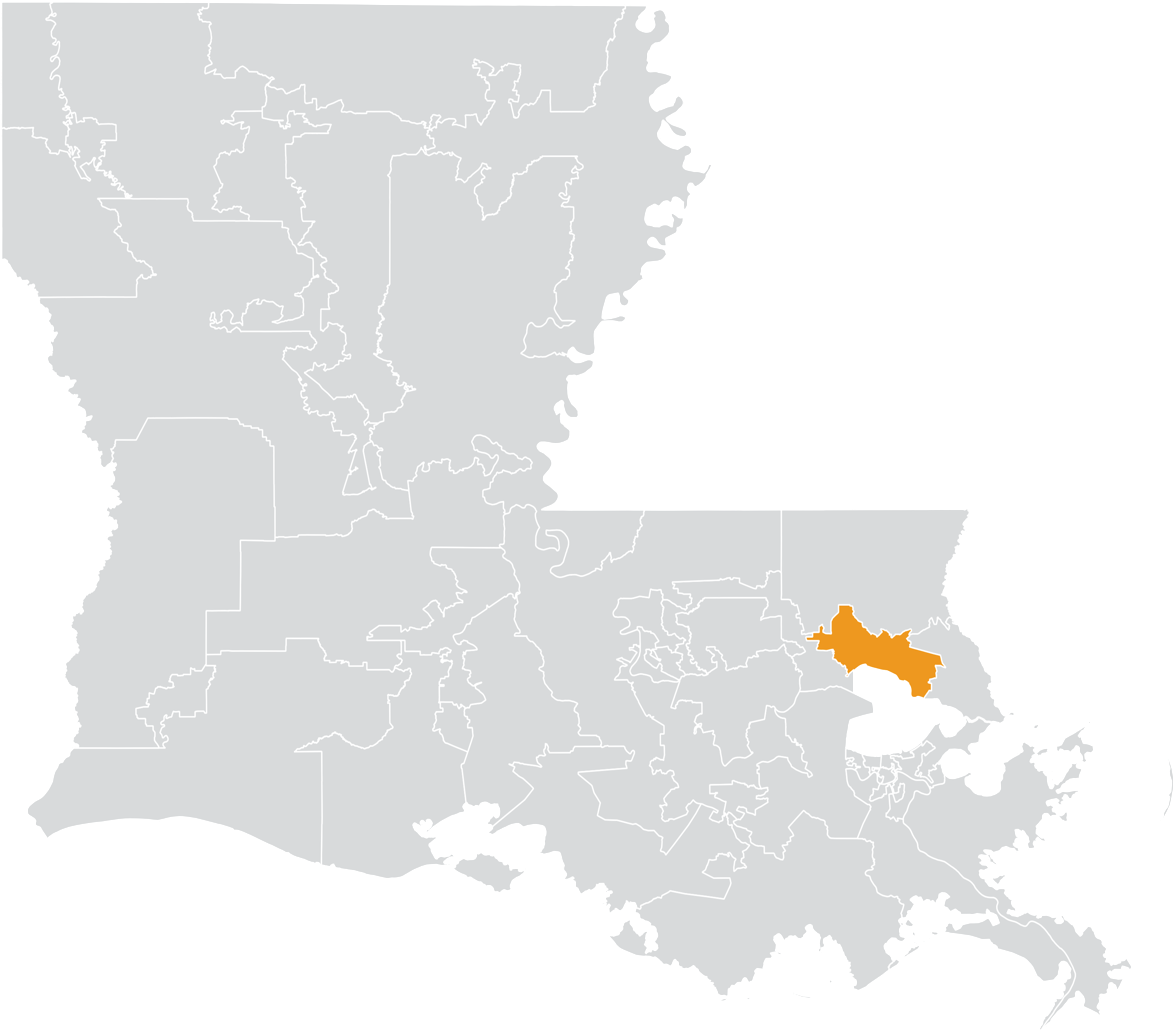
Senator
Patrick McMath; R–Covington
- Registration: 50.9% Republican; 19.9% Democratic; 29.2% No party preference
- Demographics: 83% White; 9% Black; 5% Hispanic; 2% Asian; 1% Other
- Population (2019): 141,269
- Registered voters: 98,440

Louisiana's 11th State Senate district is one of 39 districts in the Louisiana State Senate. It has been represented by Republican Patrick McMath since 2020.

== Geography ==
District 11 covers northern parts of Greater New Orleans in St. Tammany and Tangipahoa Parishes along Lake Pontchartrain, including some or all of Lacombe, Mandeville, Covington, Abita Springs, and Hammond.

The district overlaps with Louisiana's 1st and 5th congressional districts, and with the 73rd, 74th, 77th, 86th, 89th, and 104th districts of the Louisiana House of Representatives.

== Recent election results ==
Prior to 2027, Louisiana used a jungle primary system. If no candidate received 50% in the first round of voting, all on the same ballot, the top-two finishers advance to a runoff election.

In 2024, Governor Jeff Landry signed Louisiana Act 1, outlining the process for parties to move to closed primaries starting in 2027.

=== 2019 ===
2019 Louisiana State Senate election, District 11
Primary election
Party	Candidate	Votes	%
Republican	Reid Falconer	20,404	47.5
Republican	Patrick McMath	17,248	40.1
Republican	Daniel Ducote	5,345	12.4
Total votes		42,997	100
General election
Republican	Patrick McMath	27,801	55.6
Republican	Reid Falconer	22,198	44.4
Total votes		49,999	100
Republican hold			

=== 2015 ===
2015 Louisiana State Senate election, District 11
Party	Candidate	Votes	%
Republican	Jack Donahue (incumbent)	Unopposed	100
Total votes		Unopposed	100
Republican hold			

=== 2011 ===
2011 Louisiana State Senate election, District 11
Party	Candidate	Votes	%
Republican	Jack Donahue (incumbent)	19,979	81.4
Republican	Gary Leonard	4,580	18.6
Total votes		24,559	100
Republican hold			

=== Federal and statewide results ===
Year	Office	Results
2020	President	Trump 73.6–24.2%
2019	Governor (runoff)	Rispone 60.8–39.2%
2016	President	Trump 75.1–19.8%
2015	Governor (runoff)	Vitter 62.0–38.0%
2014	Senate (runoff)	Cassidy 75.3–24.7%
2012	President	Romney 77.6–20.1%
