= John R. Smith (politician, born 1945) =

American politician

Louisiana State Senator for District 30 (Beauregard, Calcasieu, and Vernon parishes)
- In office 2008–2020
- Preceded by: James David Cain
- Succeeded by: Mike Reese

Louisiana State Representative for District 30 (Beauregard and Vernon parishes)
- In office 1988–2008
- Preceded by: Claude "Buddy" Leach
- Succeeded by: James Armes

Personal details
- Born: December 29, 1945 (age 80)
- Party: Republican (2010-present)
- Other political affiliations: Democratic (Before 2010)
- Spouse: Pamela Arnondin Smith
- Relations: Chris John (son-in-law)
- Children: Bradford Smith; Payton Smith John
- Education: Loyola University New Orleans
- Occupation: Businessman

John R. Smith (born December 29, 1945) is a politician from Leesville, Louisiana. He is a Republican former member of the Louisiana State Senate for District 30.

In 2010, Smith switched from Democratic to Republican party affiliation.

== Background ==
Smith received both his Bachelor of Science and Master of Business Administration degrees from the Roman Catholic Loyola University in New Orleans.

Smith is also a former member of the Vernon Parish Police Jury and was the jury president from 1980 to 1983. Those same years, he also served on the Louisiana Democratic State Central Committee.

Smith and his wife, the former Pamela Arnondin, have a son and a daughter, Bradford Smith and Payton Smith John, the wife of former United States Representative Chris John of Louisiana's 7th congressional district, since disbanded.

== Legislative matters ==
Thereafter, Smith was unopposed for the House in 1995, 1999, and 2003.

Smith chairs the Senate Commerce, Consumer Protection, and International Affairs Committee. He is a member of on the Incentive Program Review Subcommittee of the Joint Budget Committee.

== 2011 election ==
In his bid for a second term in the general election held on November 19, 2011, Smith defeated his predecessor in the office, James David Cain. Smith received 8,457 votes (59.4 percent) to Cain's 5,772 (40.6 percent).

Smith carried the backing of Governor Bobby Jindal. In the primary held on October 22, 2011, he led a three-candidate field with 9,808 votes (45.6 percent). Cain trailed with 6,343 (29.5 percent). Democrat Terry Fowler held the remaining but critical 5,370 votes (25 percent).

== Notes ==
Louisiana State Senate
Preceded by James David Cain	Louisiana State Senator for District 30 (Beauregard, Calcasieu, and Vernon parishes); John R. Smith; 2008–2020	Succeeded by Mike Reese
Louisiana House of Representatives
Preceded by Claude "Buddy" Leach	Louisiana State Representative for District 30 (Beauregard and Vernon parishes); John R. Smith; 1988–2008	Succeeded by James Armes
