= Louisiana's 33rd State Senate district =

American legislative district

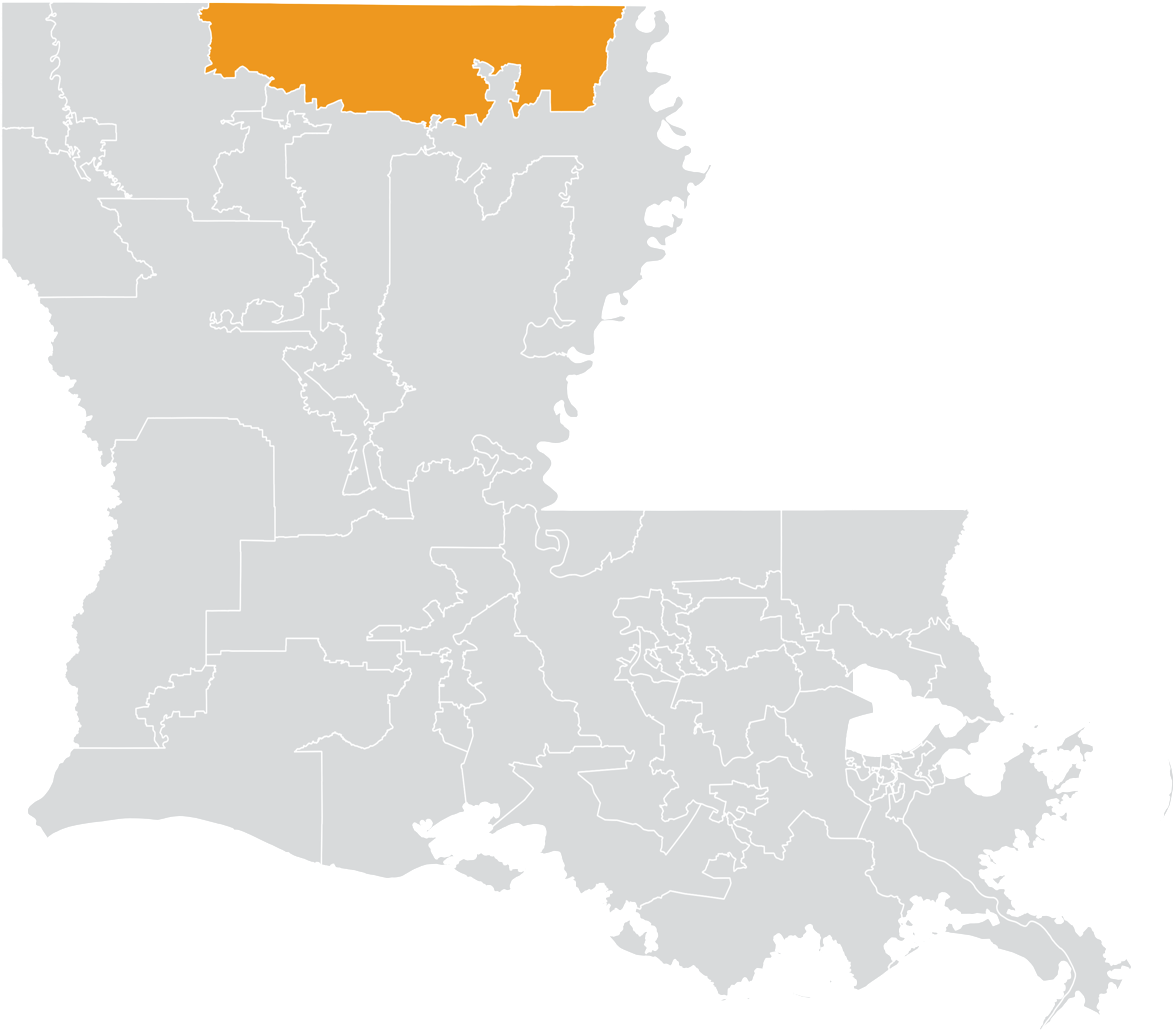
Senator
Stewart Cathey, Jr. R–Monroe
- Registration: 41.3% Republican; 34.9% Democratic; 23.8% No party preference
- Demographics: 66% White; 29% Black; 3% Hispanic; 1% Asian; 1% Other
- Population (2019): 113,376
- Registered voters: 74,339

Louisiana's 33rd State Senate district is one of 39 districts in the Louisiana State Senate. It has been represented by Republican Stewart Cathey, Jr. since 2020, succeeding fellow Republican Mike Walsworth.

== Geography ==
District 33 covers much of North Louisiana's border with Arkansas, including all of Union and West Carroll Parishes and parts of Claiborne, Lincoln, Morehouse, and Ouachita Parishes. Towns entirely or partially within the district include Oak Grove, Bastrop, Farmerville, Swartz, Monroe, West Monroe, Claiborne, Homer, and Haynesville.

The district is split between Louisiana's 4th and 5th congressional districts, and overlaps with the 11th, 12th, 14th, 15th, 16th, 17th, and 19th districts of the Louisiana House of Representatives.

== Recent election results ==
Louisiana uses a jungle primary system. If no candidate receives 50% in the first round of voting, when all candidates appear on the same ballot regardless of party, the top-two finishers advance to a runoff election.

=== 2019 ===
2019 Louisiana State Senate election, District 33
Party	Candidate	Votes	%
Republican	Stewart Cathey, Jr.	16,626	51.9
Republican	Wade Bishop	15,381	48.1
Total votes		32,007	100
Republican hold			

=== 2015 ===
2015 Louisiana State Senate election, District 33
Party	Candidate	Votes	%
Republican	Mike Walsworth (incumbent)	15,891	62.3
Republican	Vance McAllister	9,626	37.7
Total votes		25,517	100
Republican hold			

=== 2011 ===
2011 Louisiana State Senate election, District 33
Party	Candidate	Votes	%
Republican	Mike Walsworth (incumbent)	Unopposed	100
Total votes		Unopposed	100
Republican hold			

=== Federal and statewide results ===
Year	Office	Results
2020	President	Trump 72.8–26.0%
2019	Governor (runoff)	Rispone 65.3–34.7%
2016	President	Trump 72.4–25.3%
2015	Governor (runoff)	Vitter 60.1–39.9%
2014	Senate (runoff)	Cassidy 71.4–28.6%
2012	President	Romney 71.0–27.8%
