= Danny Martiny =

American politician (born 1951)

Majority Leader of the Louisiana Senate
- In office January 9, 2012 – January 13, 2020
- Preceded by: ???
- Succeeded by: Sharon Hewitt

Member of the Louisiana Senate from the 10th district
- In office January 14, 2008 – January 13, 2020
- Preceded by: Art Lentini
- Succeeded by: Kirk Talbot

Member of the Louisiana House of Representatives from the 79th district
- In office May 1994 – January 14, 2008
- Preceded by: Skip Hand
- Succeeded by: Tony Ligi

Personal details
- Born: June 27, 1951 (age 75) New Orleans, Louisiana, U.S.
- Party: Republican
- Spouse: Nina McCarthy
- Children: 3
- Education: Louisiana State University, Baton Rouge (BA); Loyola University New Orleans (JD)

Daniel R. Martiny, known as Danny Martiny (born June 27, 1951), is a politician and attorney from Jefferson Parish, Louisiana, who served between 2008 and 2020 as a Republican member of the Louisiana State Senate for the 10th district, based in the New Orleans suburbs. He was also the Senate Majority Leader from 2012 until 2020.

From 1994 to 2008, Martiny held the District 79 seat, also in Jefferson Parish, in the Louisiana House of Representatives. Martiny ran for the Senate in the nonpartisan blanket primary held on October 20, 2007. Martiny won with 19,414 votes (68.9%) to 8,752 ballots (31.1%) for the independent candidate, Michael Zito.

Martiny was born in New Orleans, the second of five children, to Wilfred "Wil" E. Martiny Doris Rault

He operates his own law firm in Metairie; prior to his legislative service, he was also an assistant Jefferson Parish attorney from 1978 to 1994. He and his wife, the former Maureen "Nina" McCarthy, live in Kenner. They have three sons.

Martiny was elected to the House in a special election held on May 21, 1994, after the Republican incumbent, Kernan "Skip" Hand resigned. With 2,059 votes (60.8%), Martiny defeated two Republican rivals, Dan Kelly and Vincent Bruno. Martiny won the 1995 primary. Thereafter, Martiny was unopposed for his second and third terms in the House in 1999 and 2003. He was succeeded in the House by Republican Tony Ligi.

During the 2010 legislative session Martiny sponsored a bill to make attendance at a cockfight a crime.

Martiny has been a State Senator since 2007 for District 10. Has served as Chairman of the Senate Judiciary B Committee from 2008 to 2012. Currently, Chairman of the Senate Commerce Committee and Chairman of the Louisiana Judicial Compensation Committee. He is a member of the Senate Judiciary A and Labor Committees. During his tenure in the House, Danny served as Vice Chairman of the House Environmental Committee and as the Governor's floor leader on environmental issues. From 2000 to 2008, he served as Chairman of the House Criminal Justice Committee.

== Financial disclosure discrepancy ==
In 2016, Martiny's law firm, Martiny & Associates, was paid $836,266 by the Jefferson Parish Sheriff's Office. On his legally-mandated disclosure form, however, Martiny only disclosed $13,328 in payments from the sheriff.

== See also ==
- Alfred Clifton Hughes

Louisiana House of Representatives
Preceded by Skip Hand	Member of the Louisiana House of Representatives from the 79th district 1994–2008	Succeeded by Tony Ligi
Louisiana State Senate
Preceded by Art Lentini	Member of the Louisiana Senate from the 10th district 2008–2020	Succeeded by Kirk Talbot
