= Louisiana's 16th State Senate district =

American legislative district

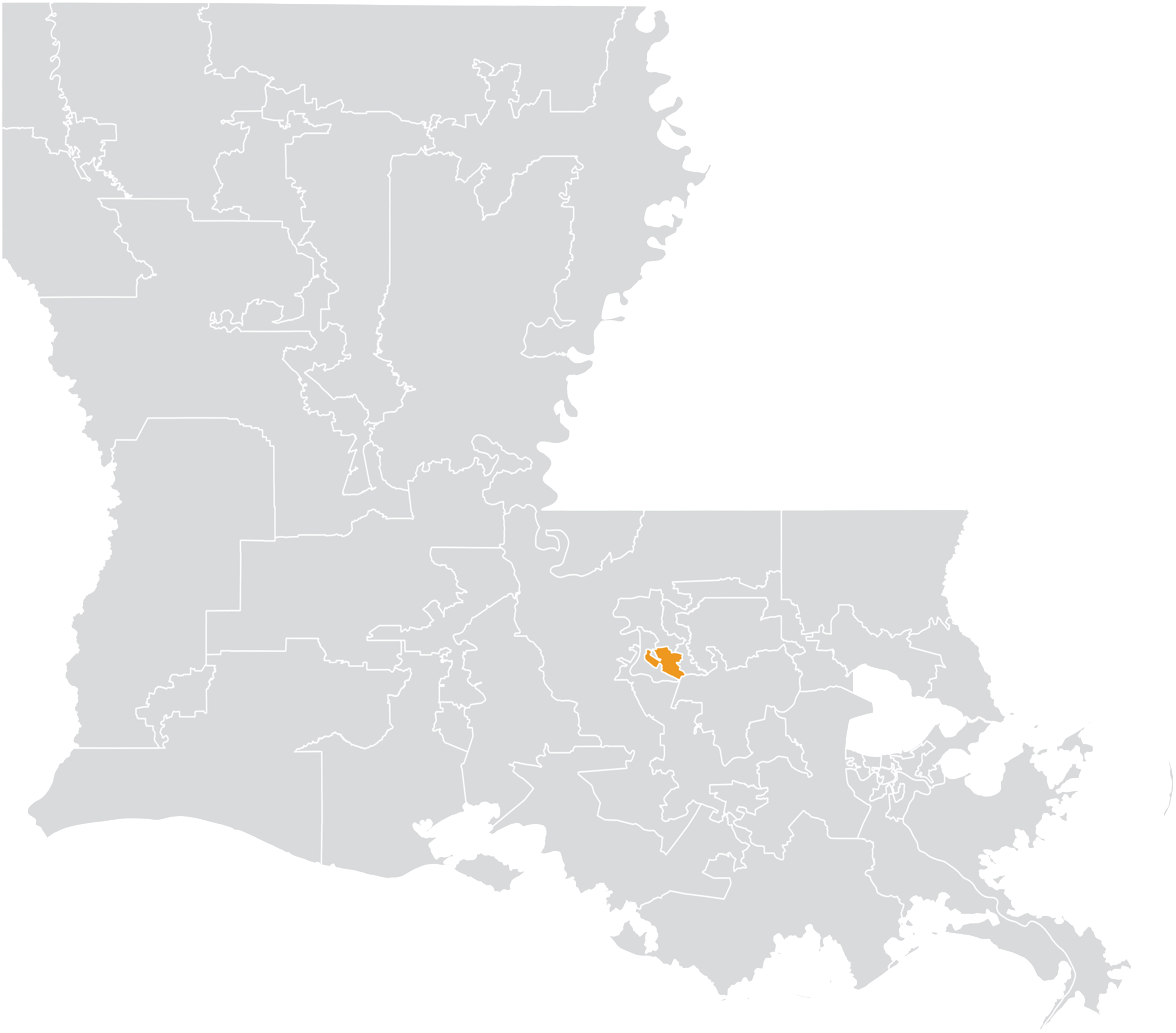
Senator
Franklin Foil; R–Baton Rouge
- Registration: 41.4% Republican; 31.2% Democratic; 27.4% No party preference
- Demographics: 69% White; 20% Black; 4% Hispanic; 4% Asian; 2% Other
- Population (2019): 120,446
- Registered voters: 80,610

Louisiana's 16th State Senate district is one of 39 districts in the Louisiana State Senate. It has been represented by Republican Franklin Foil since 2020.

== Geography ==
District 16 covers south-central East Baton Rouge Parish, including parts of Baton Rouge and all of Inniswold, Oak Hills Place, Village St. George, and Westminster.

The district is located entirely within Louisiana's 6th congressional district, and overlaps with the 61st, 65th, 66th, 68th, 69th, and 70th districts of the Louisiana House of Representatives.

== Recent election results ==
Louisiana uses a jungle primary system. If no candidate receives 50% in the first round of voting, when all candidates appear on the same ballot regardless of party, the top-two finishers advance to a runoff election.

=== 2019 ===
2019 Louisiana State Senate election, District 16
Primary election
Party	Candidate	Votes	%
Democratic	Beverly Brooks Thompson	14,213	33.7
Republican	Franklin Foil	12,523	29.7
Republican	Steve Carter	12,519	29.7
Republican	Bob Bell	1,826	4.3
Libertarian	Everett Baudean	1,086	2.6
Total votes		42,167	100
General election
Republican	Franklin Foil	27,090	57.6
Democratic	Beverly Brooks Thompson	19,912	42.4
Total votes		47,002	100
Republican hold			

Initially, Franklin Foil and Steve Carter were exactly tied for second place, leading to a 3-way runoff election. However, following a recount, Foil was found to be the winner by 4 votes, and Carter conceded.

=== 2015 ===
2015 Louisiana State Senate election, District 16
Party	Candidate	Votes	%
Republican	Dan Claitor (incumbent)	16,506	50.7
Republican	Scott McKnight	11,462	35.2
Independent	Brent Campanella	4,564	14.0
Total votes		32,532	100
Republican hold			

=== 2011 ===
2011 Louisiana State Senate election, District 16
Party	Candidate	Votes	%
Republican	Dan Claitor (incumbent)	Unopposed	100
Total votes		Unopposed	100
Republican hold			

=== Federal and statewide results ===
Year	Office	Results
2020	President	Trump 59.7–37.8%
2019	Governor (runoff)	Edwards 52.3–47.7%
2016	President	Trump 58.7–34.2%
2015	Governor (runoff)	Edwards 54.0-46.0%
2014	Senate (runoff)	Cassidy 67.4–32.6%
2012	President	Romney 67.0–30.5%
