= Louisiana's 32nd State Senate district =

American legislative district

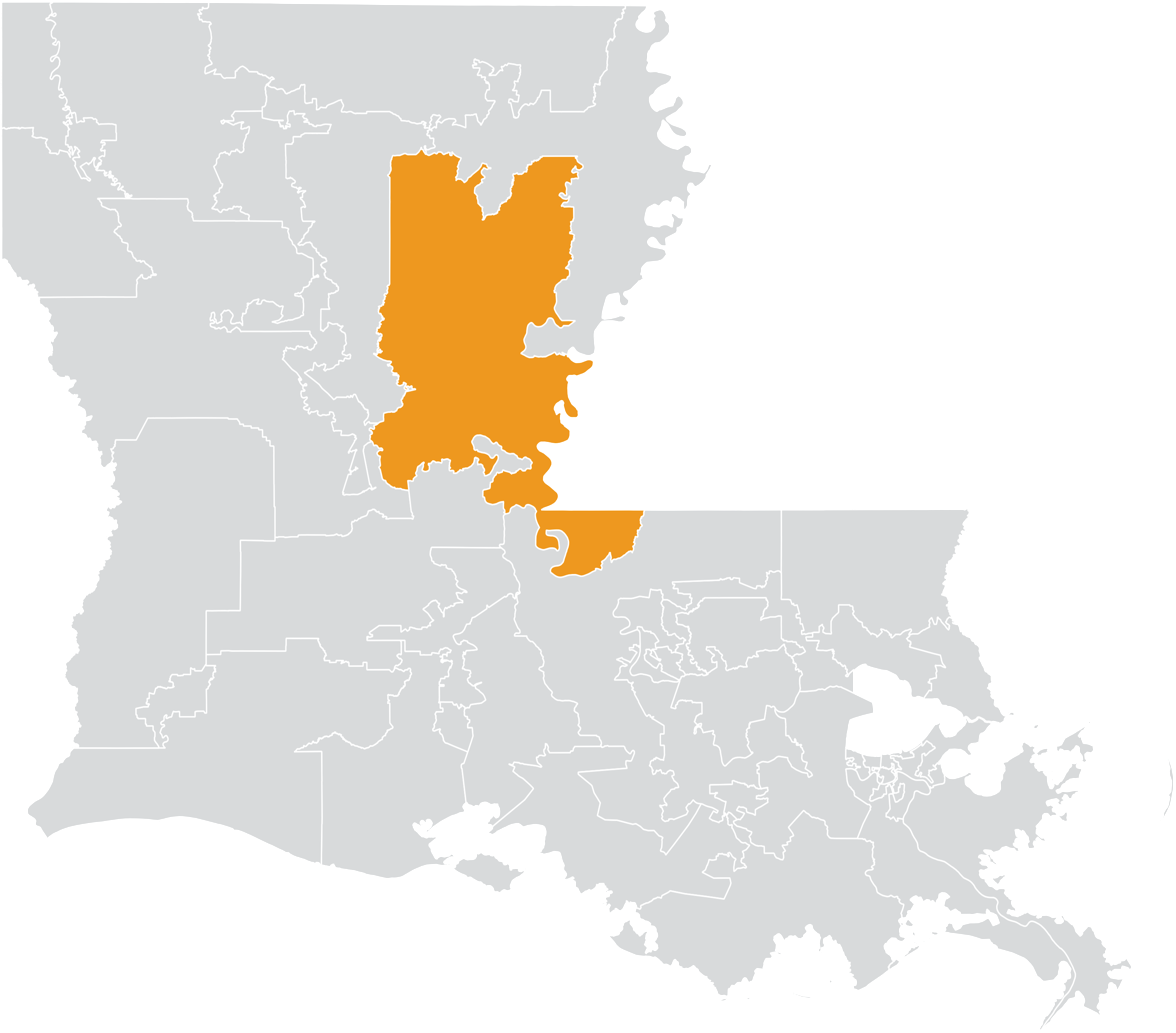
Senator
Glen Womack; R–Harrisonburg
- Registration: 39.4% Republican; 36.7% Democratic; 23.9% No party preference
- Demographics: 74% White; 23% Black; 2% Hispanic; 0% Asian; 1% Other
- Population (2019): 111,487
- Registered voters: 70,006

Louisiana's 32nd State Senate district is one of 39 districts in the Louisiana State Senate. It has been represented by Republican Glen Womack since 2020, succeeding term-limited fellow Republican Neil Riser.

== Geography ==
District 32 covers a massive swath of Central Louisiana and Acadiana, including all of Caldwell, Catahoula, Franklin, and LaSalle Parishes, as well as parts of Avoyelles, Concordia, Ouachita, Rapides, Richland, and West Feliciana Parishes. Towns entirely or partially within the district include Jonesville, Winnsboro, Jena, Ferriday, Vidalia, and St. Francisville.

The district is located entirely within Louisiana's 5th congressional district, and overlaps with the 15th, 17th, 18th, 19th, 20th, 21st, 22nd, 27th, 28th, and 62nd districts of the Louisiana House of Representatives.

At over 4,000 square miles, it is the largest Senate district in Louisiana.

== Recent election results ==
Louisiana uses a jungle primary system. If no candidate receives 50% in the first round of voting, when all candidates appear on the same ballot regardless of party, the top-two finishers advance to a runoff election.

=== 2019 ===
2019 Louisiana State Senate election, District 32
Party	Candidate	Votes	%
Republican	Glen Womack	18,588	50.1
Republican	Steve May	11,400	30.7
Democratic	Judia Duhon	4,763	12.8
Democratic	Daniel Cole	2,341	6.3
Total votes		37,092	100
Republican hold			

=== 2015 ===
2015 Louisiana State Senate election, District 32
Party	Candidate	Votes	%
Republican	Neil Riser (incumbent)	Unopposed	100
Total votes		Unopposed	100
Republican hold			

=== 2011 ===
2011 Louisiana State Senate election, District 32
Party	Candidate	Votes	%
Republican	Neil Riser (incumbent)	Unopposed	100
Total votes		Unopposed	100
Republican hold			

=== Federal and statewide results ===
Year	Office	Results
2020	President	Trump 80.5–18.5%
2019	Governor (runoff)	Rispone 70.2–29.8%
2016	President	Trump 79.2–19.0%
2015	Governor (runoff)	Vitter 58.9–41.1%
2014	Senate (runoff)	Cassidy 75.5–24.5%
2012	President	Romney 76.1–22.6%
