= Louisiana's 10th State Senate district =

American legislative district

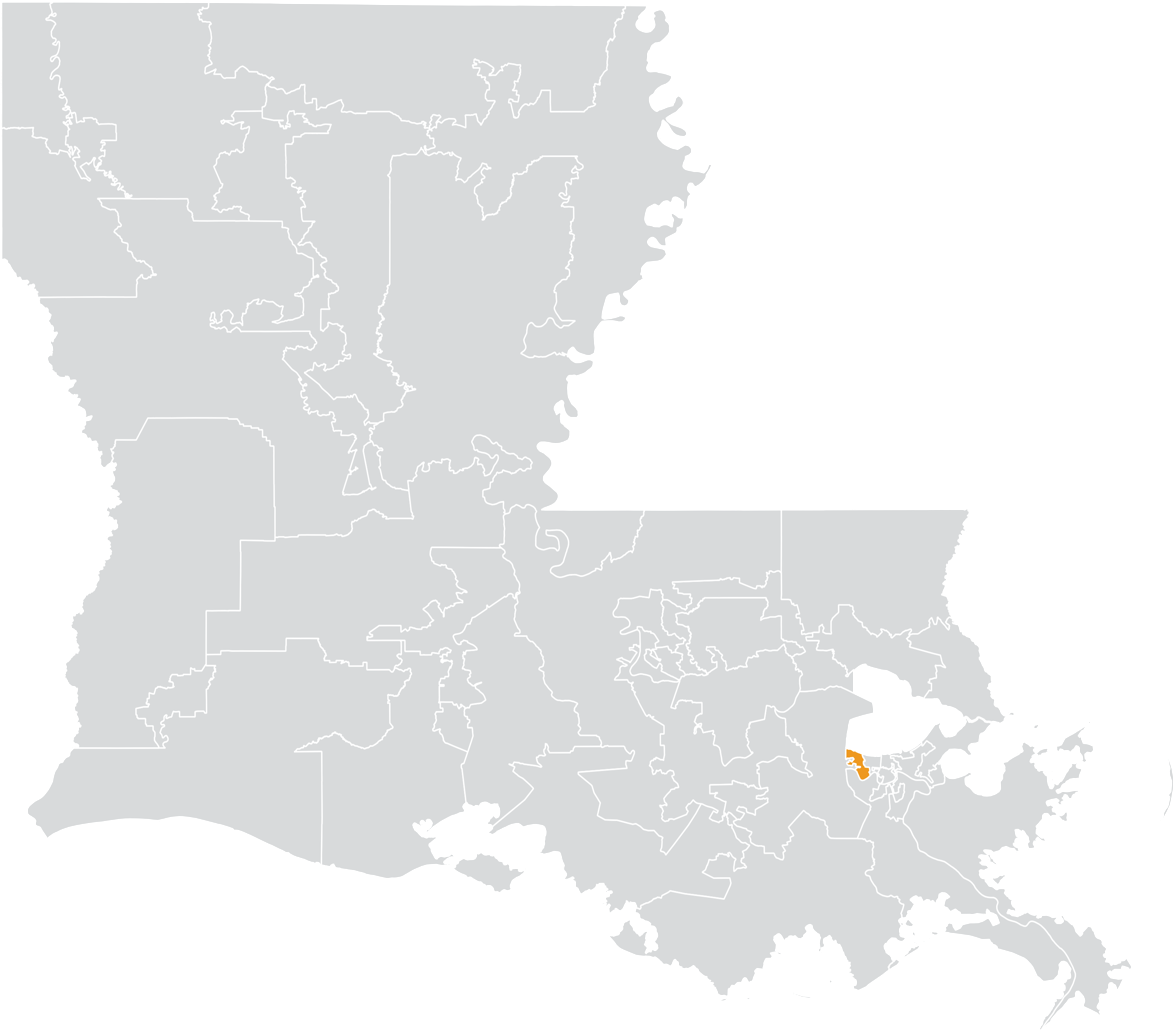
Senator
Kirk Talbot; R–River Ridge
- Registration: 40.9% Republican; 29.1% Democratic; 30.0% No party preference
- Demographics: 65% White; 11% Black; 18% Hispanic; 4% Asian; 1% Other
- Population (2019): 119,853
- Registered voters: 75,370

Louisiana's 10th State Senate district is one of 39 districts in the Louisiana State Senate. It has been represented by Republican Kirk Talbot since 2020, succeeding fellow Republican Daniel Martiny.

== Geography ==
District 10 is based entirely in Jefferson Parish along Lake Pontchartrain, including some or all of the Greater New Orleans suburbs of Metairie, Kenner, Harahan, Elmwood, and River Ridge.

The district overlaps with Louisiana's 1st and 2nd congressional districts, and with the 78th, 79th, 82nd, and 92nd districts of the Louisiana House of Representatives.

== Recent election results ==
Louisiana uses a jungle primary system. If no candidate receives 50% in the first round of voting, when all candidates appear on the same ballot regardless of party, the top-two finishers advance to a runoff election.

=== 2019 ===
2019 Louisiana State Senate election, District 10
Party	Candidate	Votes	%
Republican	Kirk Talbot	16,699	54.9
Republican	Arita Lipps Bohannan	13,723	45.1
Total votes		30,422	100
Republican hold			

=== 2015 ===
2015 Louisiana State Senate election, District 10
Party	Candidate	Votes	%
Republican	Daniel Martiny (incumbent)	Unopposed	100
Total votes		Unopposed	100
Republican hold			

=== 2011 ===
2011 Louisiana State Senate election, District 10
Party	Candidate	Votes	%
Republican	Daniel Martiny (incumbent)	Unopposed	100
Total votes		Unopposed	100
Republican hold			

=== Federal and statewide results ===
Year	Office	Results
2020	President	Trump 65.6–32.6%
2019	Governor (runoff)	Rispone 53.9–46.1%
2016	President	Trump 67.2–27.9%
2015	Governor (runoff)	Vitter 61.3–38.7%
2014	Senate (runoff)	Cassidy 68.3–31.7%
2012	President	Romney 72.4–25.2%
