= Glen Womack =

American politician and businessman

Glen D. Womack
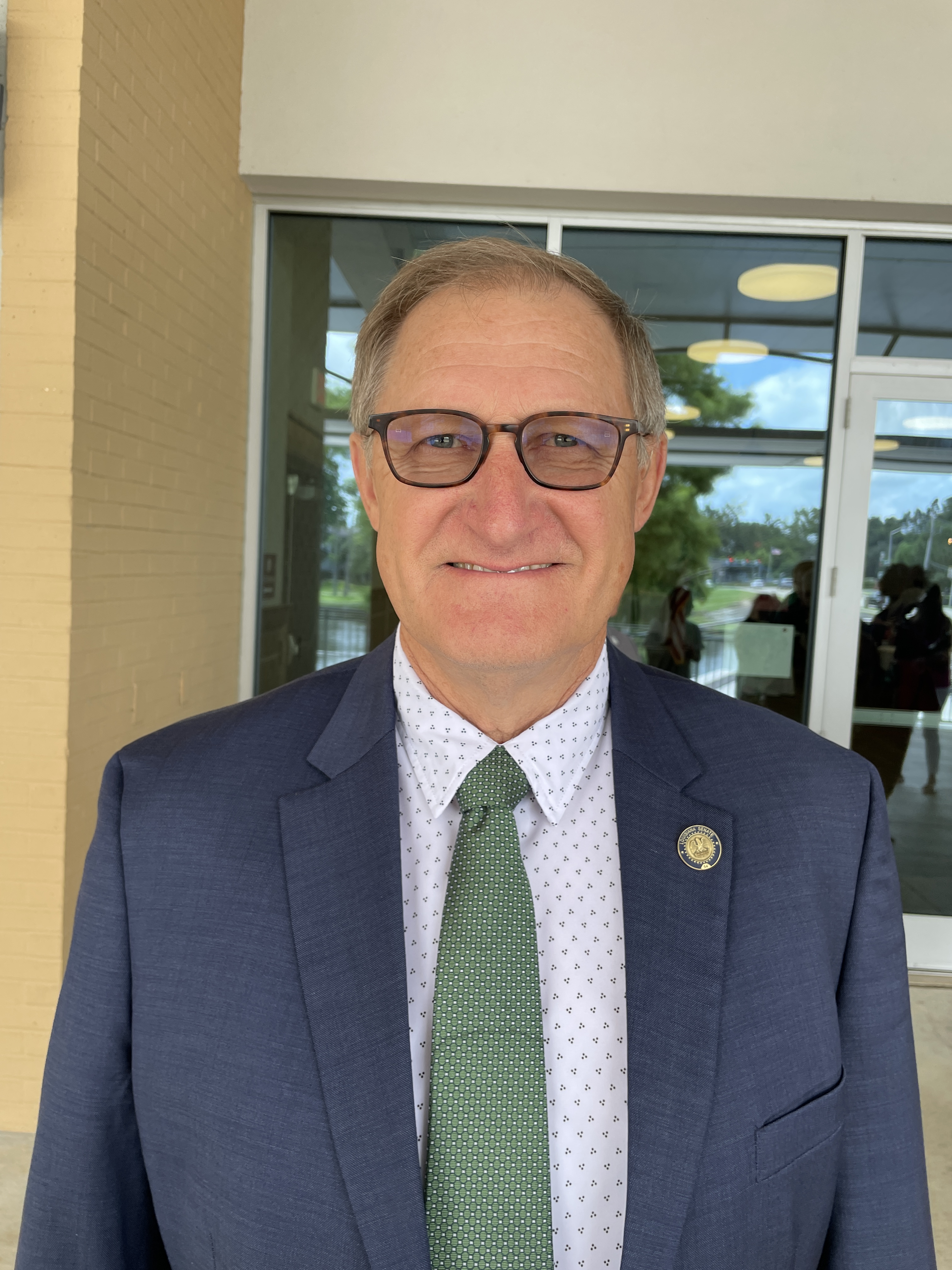

Member of the Louisiana Senate from the 32nd district
- Incumbent
- Assumed office January 13, 2020
- Preceded by: Neil Riser

Personal details
- Party: Republican
- Spouse: Judy (Cotten) Womack
- Children: 3 (James Womack, Chase Womack & Paige (Womack) Barbo

Glen D. Womack is an American politician and businessman from the state of Louisiana. A Republican, Womack has represented the 32nd district of the Louisiana State Senate, covering parts of Central Louisiana since 2020.

Womack is the founder of Womack & Sons Construction Group, a utility management and commercial construction enterprise based in Harrisonburg. In 2019, Womack ran for term-limited Republican Neil Riser's State Senate seat, winning in the first round with 50.1% of the vote.
