= Stewart Cathey Jr. =

American politician and businessman

Stewart Cathey
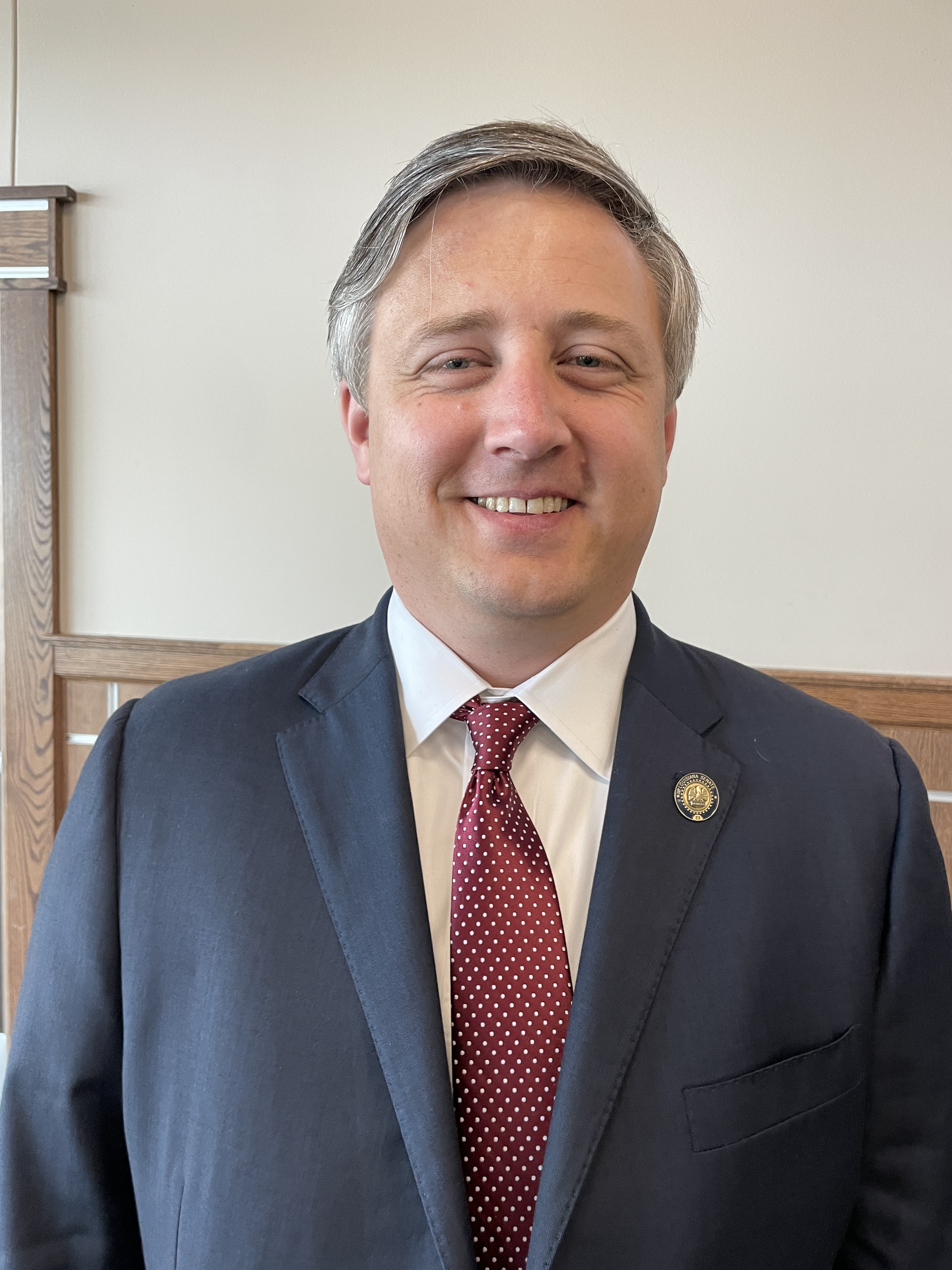
- Cathey in 2026

Member of the Louisiana Senate from the 33rd district
- Incumbent
- Assumed office January 13, 2020
- Preceded by: Mike Walsworth

Personal details
- Born: April 19, 1981 (age 45)
- Party: Republican
- Education: University of Louisiana, Monroe (BBA)

Stewart Cathey Jr. (born April 19, 1981) is an American politician and businessman. A Republican, he has represented the 33rd district in the Louisiana State Senate, covering Monroe and surrounding areas, since 2020.

== Education and military service ==
After graduating from the University of Louisiana at Monroe, Cathey joined the U.S. Army in 2003, where he served as a commissioned officer and army engineer. He deployed for a second time in 2016. Cathey has additionally worked as a managing partner at the Cathey Group since 2013.

== Political career ==
In 2015, Cathey ran for the 35th district of the Louisiana State Senate, losing to fellow Republican James Fannin. Cathey ran again for the State Senate in 2019 in the neighboring 33rd district and defeated fellow Republican, former West Monroe Chamber of Commerce chairman Wade Bishop, with 52% of the vote.

On 8 July 2026, Cathey launched his campaign for Louisiana's 5th congressional district after incumbent representative Julia Letlow chose to run for the U.S. Senate. Cathey finished fifth in the nine-candidate open primary on 3 November, receiving 12.4% of the vote in unofficial returns. Pat Moore and Gabe Firment advanced to the 12 December runoff.
