= Louisiana's 30th State Senate district =

American legislative district

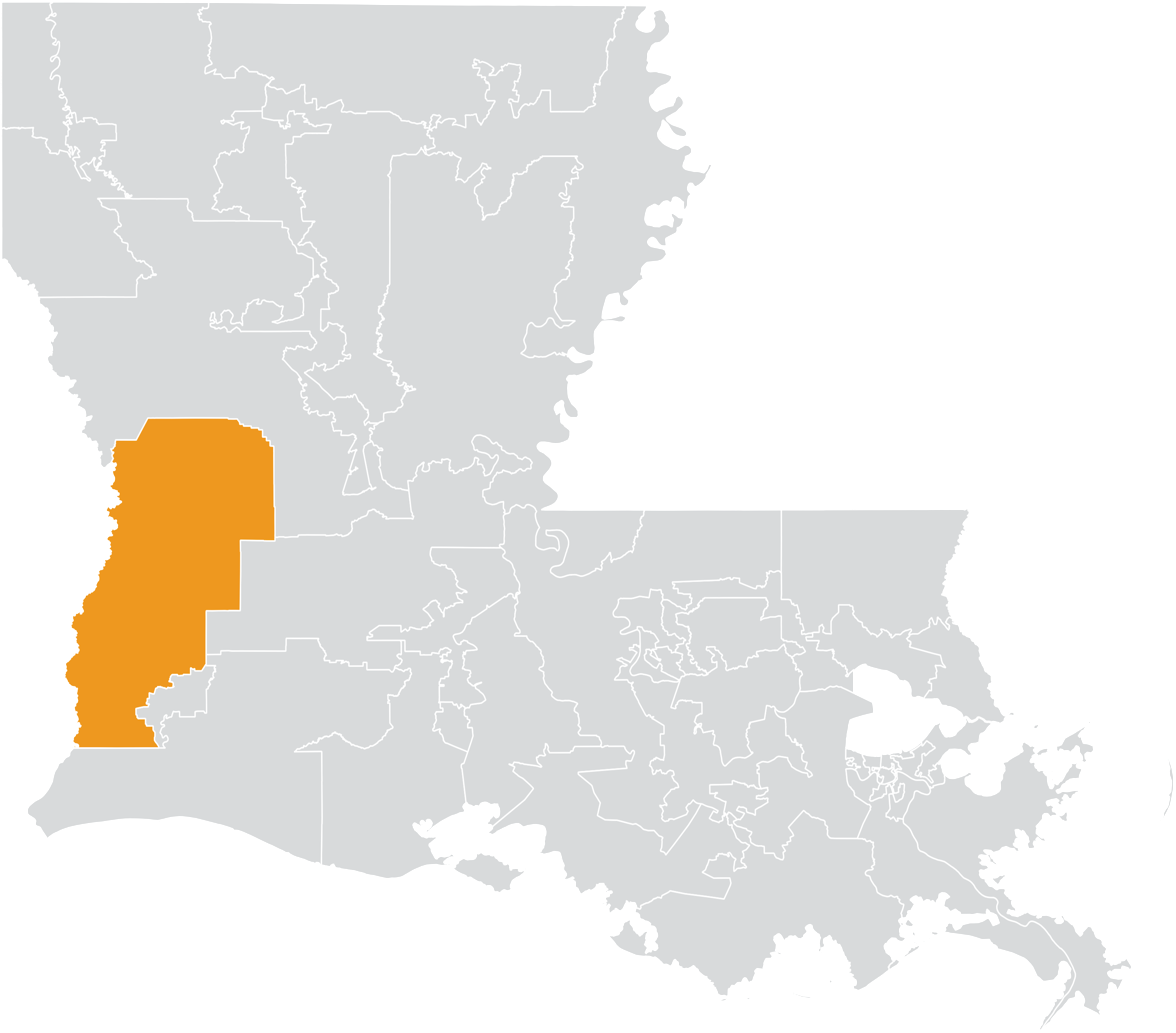
Senator
Mike Reese; R–Leesville
- Registration: 37.7% Republican; 31.1% Democratic; 31.2% No party preference
- Demographics: 78% White; 11% Black; 6% Hispanic; 1% Asian; 1% Native American; 3% Other
- Population (2019): 114,109
- Registered voters: 63,415

Louisiana's 30th State Senate district is one of 39 districts in the Louisiana State Senate. It has been represented by Republican Mike Reese since 2020, succeeding fellow Republican John Smith.

== Geography ==
District 30 covers part of western Calcasieu Parish and all of Beauregard and Vernon Parishes along the Texas border, including Vinton, Dequincy, DeRidder, Fort Johnson South, Fort Johnson North, New Llano, and Leesville.

The district overlaps with Louisiana's 3rd and 4th congressional districts, and with the 24th, 30th, 32nd, 33rd, 35th, and 47th districts of the Louisiana House of Representatives.

== Recent election results ==
Louisiana uses a jungle primary system. If no candidate receives 50% in the first round of voting, when all candidates appear on the same ballot regardless of party, the top-two finishers advance to a runoff election.

=== 2019 ===
2019 Louisiana State Senate election, District 30
Party	Candidate	Votes	%
Republican	Mike Reese	14,625	50.7
Republican	Brett Geymann	6,296	21.8
Democratic	James Armes	5,973	20.7
Republican	Renee Hoffpauir-Klann	1,935	6.7
Total votes		28,829	100
Republican hold			

=== 2015 ===
2015 Louisiana State Senate election, District 30
Party	Candidate	Votes	%
Republican	John Smith (incumbent)	Unopposed	100
Total votes		Unopposed	100
Republican hold			

=== 2011 ===
2011 Louisiana State Senate election, District 30
Primary election
Party	Candidate	Votes	%
Republican	John Smith (incumbent)	10,216	45.7
Republican	James David Cain	6,628	29.7
Democratic	Terry Fowler	5,496	24.6
Total votes		22,340	100
General election
Republican	John Smith (incumbent)	8,457	59.4
Republican	James David Cain	5,772	40.6
Total votes		14,229	100
Republican hold			

=== Federal and statewide results ===
Year	Office	Results
2020	President	Trump 82.7–15.9%
2019	Governor (runoff)	Rispone 73.7–26.3%
2016	President	Trump 81.6–15.4%
2015	Governor (runoff)	Vitter 57.2–42.8%
2014	Senate (runoff)	Cassidy 79.9–20.1%
2012	President	Romney 78.2–19.9%
