= Dan Claitor =

American politician

Member of the Louisiana State Senate from the 16th district
- In office April 2009 – January 13, 2020
- Preceded by: Bill Cassidy
- Succeeded by: Franklin Foil

Personal details
- Born: Baton Rouge, Louisiana, U.S.
- Party: Republican
- Spouse: Sharmaine Claitor
- Children: 2
- Education: Louisiana State University; Loyola University New Orleans

Dan Claitor is an American politician. He served as a Republican member for the 16th district of the Louisiana State Senate.

Claitor was born in Baton Rouge, Louisiana. He attended Louisiana State University, where he earned a bachelor's degree, and then earned a Juris Doctor degree at Loyola University New Orleans. In 2009, Claitor won the election for the 16th district of the Louisiana State Senate. He succeeded Bill Cassidy. In 2014, Claitor was a candidate for the 6th congressional district of the United States House of Representatives, but was not elected. In 2020, he was succeeded by Franklin Foil for the 16th district.
