= Louisiana's 8th State Senate district =

American legislative district

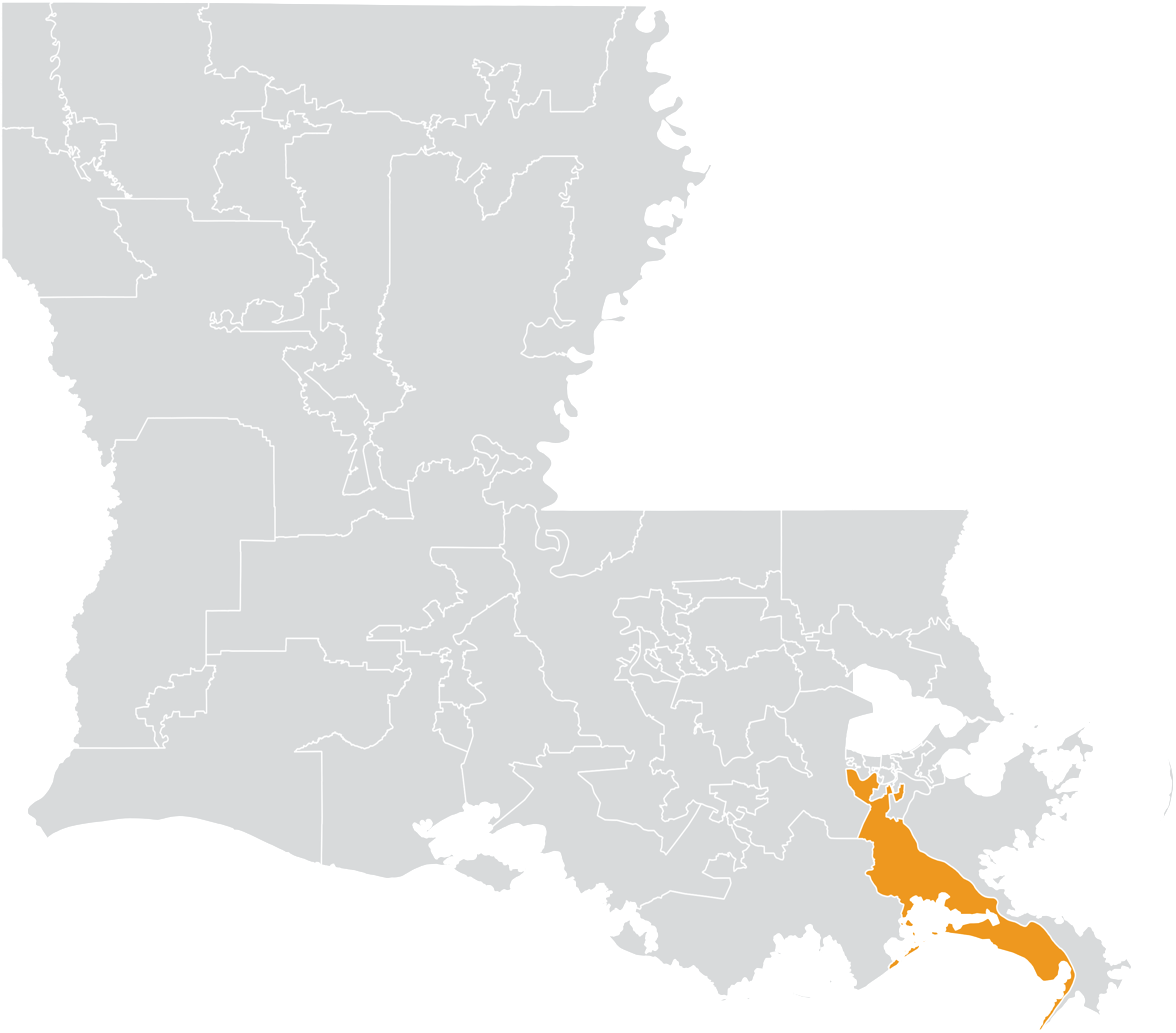
Senator
Patrick Connick; R–Harvey
- Registration: 46.2% Democratic; 23.1% Republican; 30.7% No party preference
- Demographics: 47% White; 34% Black; 10% Hispanic; 6% Asian; 1% Native American; 3% Other
- Population (2019): 119,347
- Registered voters: 74,444

Louisiana's 8th State Senate district is one of 39 districts in the Louisiana State Senate. It has been represented by Republican Patrick Connick since 2020, succeeding term-limited incumbent and Senate President John Alario. It is currently the most Democratic-leaning district in the Senate to be held by a Republican.

== Geography ==
District 8 covers parts of Jefferson Parish and Plaquemines Parish in Greater New Orleans, including some or all of Gretna, Harvey, Westwego, Waggaman, Jean Lafitte, Port Sulphur, and Grand Isle.

The district overlaps with Louisiana's 1st and 2nd congressional districts, and with the 54th, 83rd, 84th, 85th, 87th, and 105th districts of the Louisiana House of Representatives.

== Recent election results ==
Louisiana uses a jungle primary system. If no candidate receives 50% in the first round of voting, when all candidates appear on the same ballot regardless of party, the top-two finishers advance to a runoff election.

=== 2019 ===
2019 Louisiana State Senate election, District 8
Party	Candidate	Votes	%
Republican	Patrick Connick	Unopposed	100
Total votes		Unopposed	100
Republican hold			

=== 2015 ===
2015 Louisiana State Senate election, District 8
Party	Candidate	Votes	%
Republican	John Alario (incumbent)	Unopposed	100
Total votes		Unopposed	100
Republican hold			

=== 2011 ===
2011 Louisiana State Senate election, District 8
Party	Candidate	Votes	%
Republican	John Alario (incumbent)	Unopposed	100
Total votes		Unopposed	100
Republican hold			

=== Federal and statewide results ===
Year	Office	Results
2020	President	Trump 52.9–45.7%
2019	Governor (runoff)	Edwards 60.9–39.1%
2016	President	Trump 51.9–45.0%
2015	Governor (runoff)	Edwards 59.2–40.8%
2014	Senate (runoff)	Landrieu 56.5–43.5%
2012	President	Romney 51.9–46.6%
