= Neil Riser =

American politician (born 1962)

Member of the Louisiana House of Representatives from the 20th district
- Incumbent
- Assumed office January 13, 2020
- Preceded by: Steven Pylant

Member of the Louisiana State Senate from the 32nd district
- In office 2007 – January 2020
- Preceded by: Noble Ellington
- Succeeded by: Glen Womack

Personal details
- Born: Hartwell Neil Riser Jr. April 25, 1962 (age 64) Columbia, Louisiana, U.S.
- Party: Republican
- Spouse: Vicki Riser
- Children: 2
- Education: University of Louisiana at Monroe

Hartwell Neil Riser Jr. (born April 25, 1962) is an American politician. He serves as a Republican member for the 20th district of the Louisiana House of Representatives. He previously served as a member for the 32nd district of the Louisiana State Senate.

== Early life and career ==
Riser was born in Columbia, LouisianaColumbia, Louisiana., and graduated from Caldwell Parish High School in 1980. He earned a B.A. in business management from Northeast Louisiana University (now the University of Louisiana at Monroe) in 1984 and is the owner of Riser Funeral Home. He joined the family funeral business in 1985 after the death of his father, H. Neil Riser Sr.

In 2007, Riser was elected to represent the 32nd district of the Louisiana State Senate, succeeding Noble Ellington. In 2020, he was succeeded by Glen Womack. In the same year, he was elected to represent the 20th district of the Louisiana House of Representatives, succeeding Steven Pylant. He assumed office on January 13, 2020.

== Louisiana State Senate ==
Riser represented the 32nd district in the Louisiana State Senate from 2008 to January 2020, succeeding Noble Ellington and later succeeded by Glen Womack. During his tenure he chaired the Senate Committee on Revenue and Fiscal Affairs and served on the State Bond Commission.

== Louisiana House of Representatives ==
Riser has represented House District 20 since January 13, 2020, succeeding Steven Pylant. The district includes parts of Caldwell, Catahoula, Franklin, LaSalle and Ouachita parishes. In the 2024–2028 term, his committee assignments include Commerce; Natural Resources and Environment; and the House Select Committee on Homeland Security. He is a member of the Central Louisiana Delegation, the Louisiana Republican Legislative Delegation, and the Louisiana Rural Caucus.

== Elections ==
=== 2013 U.S. House special (LA-5) ===
Riser advanced to the November 16, 2013 runoff but lost to Republican businessman Vance McAllister in an upset widely covered by national outlets.

=== 2017 State Treasurer (special) ===
Riser ran in the October 14, 2017 primary and finished fourth with about 18% of the vote; Republican John Schroder and Democrat Derrick Edwards advanced to the runoff, which Schroder won on November 18, 2017.

=== 2019 Louisiana House District 20 ===
Riser defeated Kevin Bates in the November 16, 2019 general election, 50.8% to 49.2%.

=== 2023 Louisiana House District 20 ===
He won re-election outright in the October 14, 2023 primary with 57.2% of the vote against Kevin Bates; the general election was canceled under Louisiana’s majority-vote system.

== Legislation ==
In 2024, Riser authored House Bill 684 (Act 443), which re-established a regulated black bear hunting season and created related license and lottery provisions; the measure was signed by the governor with an effective date of August 1, 2024.
