= Joel Chaisson =

American politician

Member of the Louisiana House of Representatives
- In office 1991–2000

Member of the Louisiana State Senate
- In office 2000–2012

Personal details
- Born: August 21, 1960 (age 65)
- Party: Democratic

Joel Chaisson (born August 21, 1960) is an American politician. A member of the Democratic Party, he served in the Louisiana House of Representatives from 1991 to 2000 and in the Louisiana State Senate from 2000 to 2012.
