= James R. Fannin =

James R. Fannin is a former state legislator in Louisiana who served in the Louisiana House of Representatives and the Louisiana Senate. He belonged to the Republican Party. In 2020, a resolution was passed commending him for his service.

He began his political career serving on the Jackson Parish Police Jury and its School Board. He represented Louisiana House District 13 from 2003 to 2016. After he reached the term limit in the Louisiana House he won the District 35 seat in the Louisiana Senate in 2015.

He is married to Kitty Davis Fannin and has a son Matt and daughter Marsha F. Crader.
