= Louisiana's 28th State Senate district =

American legislative district

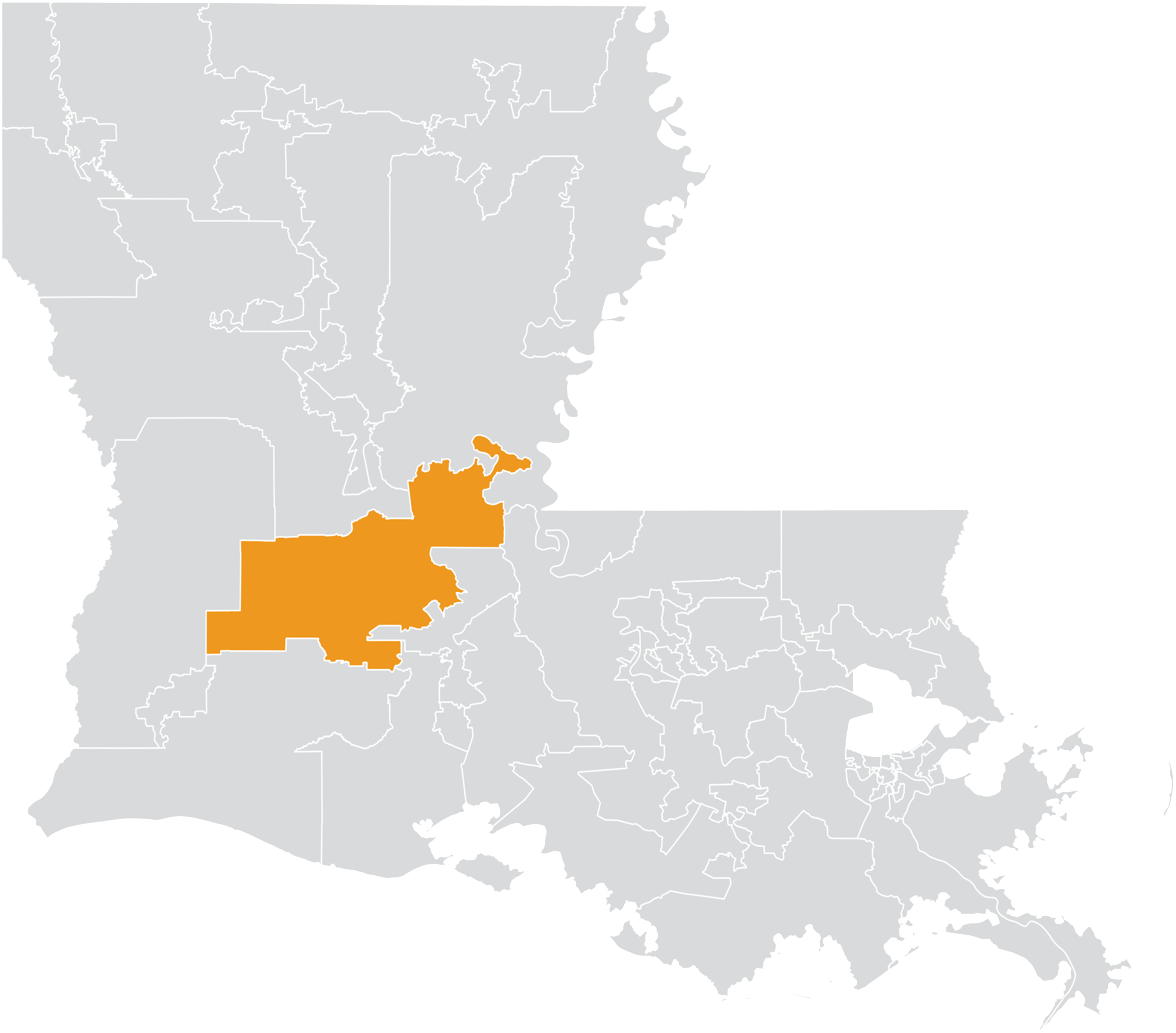
Senator
Heather Cloud; R–Turkey Creek
- Registration: 49.5% Democratic; 27.3% Republican; 23.2% No party preference
- Demographics: 68% White; 25% Black; 4% Hispanic; 0% Asian; 1% Native American; 2% Other
- Population (2019): 115,883
- Registered voters: 71,229

Louisiana's 28th State Senate district is one of 39 districts in the Louisiana State Senate. It has been represented by Republican Heather Cloud since 2020, succeeding term-limited Democrat Eric LaFleur.

== Geography ==
District 28 covers all of Allen and Evangeline Parishes and parts of Acadia, Avoyelles, and St. Landry Parishes, including some or all of Kinder, Oakdale, Ville Platte, Mamou, Eunice, Bunkie, Cottonport, Marksville, and Simmesport.

The district overlaps with Louisiana's 3rd, 4th, and 5th congressional districts, and with the 28th, 32nd, 38th, 40th, and 41st districts of the Louisiana House of Representatives.

== Recent election results ==
Louisiana uses a jungle primary system. If no candidate receives 50% in the first round of voting, when all candidates appear on the same ballot regardless of party, the top-two finishers advance to a runoff election.

=== 2019 ===
2019 Louisiana State Senate election, District 28
Party	Candidate	Votes	%
Republican	Heather Cloud	22,282	63.1
Democratic	Robert Johnson	8,361	23.7
Democratic	Bernard LeBas	4,645	13.2
Total votes		35,288	100
Republican gain from Democratic			

=== 2015 ===
2015 Louisiana State Senate election, District 28
Party	Candidate	Votes	%
Democratic	Eric LaFleur (incumbent)	Unopposed	100
Total votes		Unopposed	100
Democratic hold			

=== 2011 ===
2011 Louisiana State Senate election, District 28
Party	Candidate	Votes	%
Democratic	Eric LaFleur (incumbent)	19,392	58.8
Republican	Paul Miller	13,565	41.2
Total votes		32,957	100
Democratic hold			

=== Federal and statewide results ===
Year	Office	Results
2020	President	Trump 72.2–26.4%
2019	Governor (runoff)	Rispone 60.3–39.7%
2016	President	Trump 70.3–27.4%
2015	Governor (runoff)	Edwards 56.3–43.7%
2014	Senate (runoff)	Cassidy 64.4–35.6%
2012	President	Romney 65.7–32.7%
