= 2023 Louisiana State Senate election =

- October 14, 2023; November 18, 2023 (runoff)

All 39 seats in the Louisiana State Senate 20 seats needed for a majority
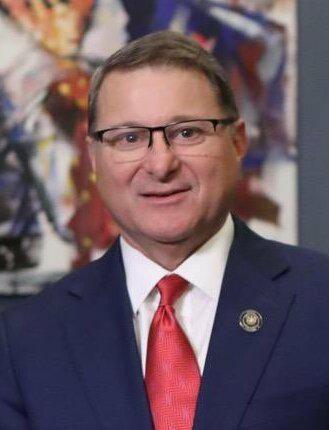

	Majority party	Minority party
Leader	Page Cortez (term-limited)	Gerald Boudreaux
Party	Republican	Democratic
Leader since	January 13, 2020	May 10, 2021
Leader's seat	23rd district	24th district
Seats before	27	12
Seats won	28	11
Seat change	▲1	▼1
Popular vote	416,502	85,619
Percentage	82.37%	16.93%
- Results: Republican gain Republican hold Democratic hold
President of the Senate before election
Page Cortez
Republican
Elected President of the Senate
Cameron Henry
Republican

The 2023 Louisiana State Senate election was held on October 14, 2023, with runoff elections held on November 18, 2023. All 39 seats in the Louisiana State Senate were up for election to four-year terms. It was held concurrently with elections for all statewide offices and the Louisiana House of Representatives.

Under Louisiana's jungle primary system, all candidates appear on the same ballot, regardless of party, and voters may vote for any candidate, regardless of their party affiliation.

== Background ==
In the 2019 state legislature elections, Republicans expanded their majorities in both chambers to 68 in the House and 27 in the Senate. Going into the 2023 elections, Republicans held a two-thirds supermajority in both the Senate and the House.

The 2023 election was the first election held under new district maps following redistricting as a result of the 2020 census.

== Predictions ==
Source	Ranking	As of
270toWin	Safe R	November 2, 2023
Elections Daily	Safe R	November 2, 2023

== Overview ==
↓
28	11
Republican	Democratic

Parties	Candidates	Votes		Seats		
Parties	Candidates	No.	%	Before	After	+/-
Republican	45	416,502	82.37%	27	28	▲1
Democratic	20	85,619	16.93%	12	11	▼1
Independent	2	3,496	0.69%	0	0	Steady
Total	67	505,617	100.00%	39	39	

Senate seats
Republican	71.79%
Democratic	28.21%

=== Summary by district ===
District	Incumbent	Party	Elected senator	Party
1st	Sharon Hewitt	Rep	Bob Owen	Rep
2nd	Ed Price	Dem	Ed Price	Dem
3rd	Joseph Bouie	Dem	Joseph Bouie	Dem
4th	Jimmy Harris	Dem	Jimmy Harris	Dem
5th	Royce Duplessis	Dem	Royce Duplessis	Dem
6th	Bodi White	Rep	Rick Edmonds	Rep
7th	Gary Carter Jr.	Dem	Gary Carter Jr.	Dem
8th	Patrick Connick	Rep	Patrick Connick	Rep
9th	Cameron Henry	Rep	Cameron Henry	Rep
10th	Kirk Talbot	Rep	Kirk Talbot	Rep
11th	Patrick McMath	Rep	Patrick McMath	Rep
12th	Beth Mizell	Rep	Beth Mizell	Rep
13th	J. Rogers Pope	Rep	Valarie Hodges	Rep
14th	Cleo Fields	Dem	Cleo Fields	Dem
15th	Regina Barrow	Dem	Regina Barrow	Dem
16th	Franklin Foil	Rep	Franklin Foil	Rep
17th	Caleb Kleinpeter	Rep	Caleb Kleinpeter	Rep
18th	Eddie J. Lambert	Rep	Eddie J. Lambert	Rep
19th	Gary Smith Jr.	Dem	Gregory A. Miller	Rep
20th	Mike Fesi	Rep	Mike Fesi	Rep
21st	Bret Allain	Rep	Robert Allain III	Rep
22nd	Fred Mills	Rep	Blake Miguez	Rep
23rd	Page Cortez	Rep	Jean-Paul Coussan	Rep
24th	Gerald Boudreaux	Dem	Gerald Boudreaux	Dem
25th	Mark Abraham	Rep	Mark Abraham	Rep
26th	Bob Hensgens	Rep	Bob Hensgens	Rep
27th	Jeremy Stine	Rep	Jeremy Stine	Rep
28th	Heather Cloud	Rep	Heather Cloud	Rep
29th	Jay Luneau	Dem	Jay Luneau	Dem
30th	Mike Reese	Rep	Mike Reese	Rep
31st	Louie Bernard	Rep	Alan Seabaugh	Rep
32nd	Glen Womack	Rep	Glen Womack	Rep
33rd	Stewart Cathey Jr.	Rep	Stewart Cathey Jr.	Rep
34th	Katrina Jackson	Dem	Katrina Jackson	Dem
35th	Jay Morris	Rep	Jay Morris	Rep
36th	Robert Mills	Rep	Adam Bass	Rep
37th	Barrow Peacock	Rep	William Wheat Jr.	Rep
38th	Barry Milligan	Rep	Thomas Pressly	Rep
39th	Gregory Tarver	Dem	Sam Jenkins	Dem

== Retirements ==
Eleven incumbents did not seek re-election.

=== Democrats ===
1. District 19: Gary Smith Jr. was term-limited.
2. District 39: Gregory Tarver was term-limited.

=== Republicans ===
1. District 1: Sharon Hewitt retired to run for governor.
2. District 6: Bodi White was term-limited.
3. District 13: J. Rogers Pope retired.
4. District 21: Bret Allain was term-limited.
5. District 22: Fred Mills was term-limited.
6. District 23: Page Cortez was term-limited.
7. District 31: Louie Bernard retired.
8. District 37: Barrow Peacock was term-limited.
9. District 38: Barry Milligan retired.

== Incumbents defeated ==
=== In primary election ===
One incumbent senator, a Republican, was defeated in the October 14 jungle primary.

==== Republicans ====
1. District 36: Robert Mills lost renomination to Adam Bass.

== Results ==
=== District 1 ===
2023 Louisiana's 1st State Senate district election
Primary election
Party	Candidate	Votes	%
Republican	Bob Owen	14,614	60.6
Republican	Ray Garofalo	9,508	39.4
Total votes		24,122	31.0

=== District 2 ===
2023 Louisiana's 2nd State Senate district election
Primary election
Party	Candidate	Votes	%
Democratic	Ed Price (incumbent)	21,018	68.1
Republican	Chris Delpit	9,865	31.9
Total votes		30,883	39.8

=== District 3 ===
2023 Louisiana's 3rd State Senate district election
Primary election
Party	Candidate	Votes	%
Democratic	Joseph Bouie (incumbent)	Unopposed	
Total votes		—N/a	100.0

=== District 4 ===
2023 Louisiana's 4th State Senate district election
Primary election
Party	Candidate	Votes	%
Democratic	Jimmy Harris (incumbent)	Unopposed	
Total votes		—N/a	100.0

=== District 5 ===
2023 Louisiana's 5th State Senate district election
Primary election
Party	Candidate	Votes	%
Democratic	Royce Duplessis (incumbent)	Unopposed	
Total votes		—N/a	100.0

=== District 6 ===
2023 Louisiana's 6th State Senate district election
Primary election
Party	Candidate	Votes	%
Republican	Rick Edmonds	18,247	61.5
Republican	Barry Ivey	11,407	38.5
Total votes		29,654	37.4

=== District 7 ===
2023 Louisiana's 7th State Senate district election
Primary election
Party	Candidate	Votes	%
Democratic	Gary Carter Jr. (incumbent)	Unopposed	
Total votes		—N/a	100.0

=== District 8 ===
2023 Louisiana's 8th State Senate district election
Primary election
Party	Candidate	Votes	%
Republican	Patrick Connick (incumbent)	29,654	52.3
Republican	Timothy Kerner Jr.	11,161	47.7
Total votes		23,424	31.3

=== District 9 ===
2023 Louisiana's 9th State Senate district election
Primary election
Party	Candidate	Votes	%
Republican	Cameron Henry (incumbent)	19,046	69.9
Democratic	Mary Anne Mushatt	8,201	30.1
Total votes		27,247	34.7

=== District 10 ===
2023 Louisiana's 10th State Senate district election
Primary election
Party	Candidate	Votes	%
Republican	Kirk Talbot (incumbent)	Unopposed	
Total votes		—N/a	100.0

=== District 11 ===
2023 Louisiana's 11th State Senate district election
Primary election
Party	Candidate	Votes	%
Republican	Patrick McMath (incumbent)	Unopposed	
Total votes		—N/a	100.0

=== District 12 ===
2023 Louisiana's 12th State Senate district election
Primary election
Party	Candidate	Votes	%
Republican	Beth Mizell (incumbent)	24,003	78.2
Democratic	Britt Gondolfi	3,842	12.5
Democratic	Gloria Kates	2,838	9.3
Total votes		30,683	40.6

=== District 13 ===
2023 Louisiana's 13th State Senate district election
Primary election
Party	Candidate	Votes	%
Republican	Valarie Hodges	17,920	64.9
Republican	Buddy Mincey Jr.	9,699	35.1
Total votes		27,619	40.4

=== District 14 ===
2023 Louisiana's 14th State Senate district election
Primary election
Party	Candidate	Votes	%
Democratic	Cleo Fields (incumbent)	Unopposed	
Total votes		—N/a	100.0

=== District 15 ===
2023 Louisiana's 15th State Senate district election
Primary election
Party	Candidate	Votes	%
Democratic	Regina Barrow (incumbent)	Unopposed	
Total votes		—N/a	100.0

=== District 16 ===
2023 Louisiana's 16th State Senate district election
Primary election
Party	Candidate	Votes	%
Republican	Franklin Foil (incumbent)	Unopposed	
Total votes		—N/a	100.0

=== District 17 ===
2023 Louisiana's 17th State Senate district election
Primary election
Party	Candidate	Votes	%
Republican	Caleb Kleinpeter (incumbent)	Unopposed	
Total votes		—N/a	100.0

=== District 18 ===
2023 Louisiana's 18th State Senate district election
Primary election
Party	Candidate	Votes	%
Republican	Eddie Lambert (incumbent)	Unopposed	
Total votes		—N/a	100.0

=== District 19 ===
2023 Louisiana's 19th State Senate district election
Primary election
Party	Candidate	Votes	%
Republican	Gregory A. Miller	19,416	68.8
Democratic	Marilyn Bellock	8,791	31.2
Total votes		28,207	35.2

=== District 20 ===
2023 Louisiana's 20th State Senate district election
Primary election
Party	Candidate	Votes	%
Republican	Mike Fesi (incumbent)	21,366	87.6
Republican	Dave Carskadon	3,014	12.4
Total votes		24,380	34.1

=== District 21 ===
2023 Louisiana's 21st State Senate district election
Primary election
Party	Candidate	Votes	%
Republican	Robert Allain III	10,815	43.8
Republican	Bo LaGrange	7,745	31.4
Republican	Stephen Swiber	6,138	24.9
Total votes		24,698	33.9
General election
Republican	Robert Allain III	9,864	59.0
Republican	Bo LaGrange	6,855	41.0
Total votes		16,719	100.0

=== District 22 ===
2023 Louisiana's 22nd State Senate district election
Primary election
Party	Candidate	Votes	%
Republican	Blake Miguez	19,559	61.2
Republican	Hugh Andre	6,608	20.7
Democratic	Mel Narcisse Mitchell	3,701	11.6
Democratic	Phanat Xanamane	1,794	5.6
Independent	Dexter Lathan	299	0.9
Total votes		31,961	38.6

=== District 23 ===
2023 Louisiana's 23rd State Senate district election
Primary election
Party	Candidate	Votes	%
Republican	Jean-Paul Coussan	Unopposed	
Total votes		—N/a	100.0

=== District 24 ===
2023 Louisiana's 24th State Senate district election
Primary election
Party	Candidate	Votes	%
Democratic	Gerald Boudreaux (incumbent)	Unopposed	
Total votes		—N/a	100.0

=== District 25 ===
2023 Louisiana's 25th State Senate district election
Primary election
Party	Candidate	Votes	%
Republican	Mark Abraham (incumbent)	21,937	80.7
Democratic	Josh Lewis	5,250	19.3
Total votes		27,187	37.3

=== District 26 ===
2023 Louisiana's 26th State Senate district election
Primary election
Party	Candidate	Votes	%
Republican	Bob Hensgens (incumbent)	Unopposed	
Total votes		—N/a	100.0

=== District 27 ===
2023 Louisiana's 27th State Senate district election
Primary election
Party	Candidate	Votes	%
Republican	Jeremy Stine (incumbent)	Unopposed	
Total votes		—N/a	100.0

=== District 28 ===
2023 Louisiana's 28th State Senate district election
Primary election
Party	Candidate	Votes	%
Republican	Heather Cloud (incumbent)	Unopposed	
Total votes		—N/a	100.0

=== District 29 ===
2023 Louisiana's 29th State Senate district election
Primary election
Party	Candidate	Votes	%
Democratic	Jay Luneau (incumbent)	Unopposed	
Total votes		—N/a	100.0

=== District 30 ===
2023 Louisiana's 30th State Senate district election
Primary election
Party	Candidate	Votes	%
Republican	Mike Reese (incumbent)	Unopposed	
Total votes		—N/a	100.0

=== District 31 ===
2023 Louisiana's 31st State Senate district election
Primary election
Party	Candidate	Votes	%
Republican	Alan Seabaugh	16,982	54.2
Republican	Mike McConathy	14,355	45.8
Total votes		31,337	39.4

=== District 32 ===
2023 Louisiana's 32nd State Senate district election
Primary election
Party	Candidate	Votes	%
Republican	Glen Womack (incumbent)	Unopposed	
Total votes		—N/a	100.0

=== District 33 ===
2023 Louisiana's 33rd State Senate district election
Primary election
Party	Candidate	Votes	%
Republican	Stewart Cathey (incumbent)	15,397	52.9
Republican	Ned White	13,711	47.1
Total votes		29,108	36.4

=== District 34 ===
2023 Louisiana's 34th State Senate district election
Primary election
Party	Candidate	Votes	%
Democratic	Katrina Jackson (incumbent)	15,872	71.1
Republican	James Smith	6,451	28.9
Total votes		22,323	30.0

=== District 35 ===
2023 Louisiana's 35th State Senate district election
Primary election
Party	Candidate	Votes	%
Republican	Jay Morris (incumbent)	Unopposed	
Total votes		—N/a	100.0

=== District 36 ===
2023 Louisiana's 36th State Senate district election
Primary election
Party	Candidate	Votes	%
Republican	Adam Bass	14,097	62.0
Republican	Robert Mills (incumbent)	8,624	38.0
Total votes		22,721	31.0

=== District 37 ===
2023 Louisiana's 37th State Senate district election
Primary election
Party	Candidate	Votes	%
Republican	William Wheat Jr.	14,516	60.9
Republican	Randy Bush	6,112	25.7
Independent	Ivan Scioneaux Jr.	3,197	13.4
Total votes		23,825	35.5

=== District 38 ===
2023 Louisiana's 38th State Senate district election
Primary election
Party	Candidate	Votes	%
Republican	Thomas Pressly	15,101	56.1
Republican	John Milkovich	6,934	25.8
Republican	Chase Jennings	4,857	18.1
Total votes		26,892	32.5

=== District 39 ===
2023 Louisiana's 39th State Senate district election
Primary election
Party	Candidate	Votes	%
Democratic	Sam Jenkins	6,526	33.7
Democratic	Cedric Glover	5,114	26.4
Republican	Jim Slagle	5,034	26.0
Democratic	Barbara Norton	2,672	13.8
Total votes		19,346	25.1
General election
Democratic	Sam Jenkins	11,814	65.3
Democratic	Cedric Glover	6,271	34.7
Total votes		18,085	100.0

== See also ==
- 2023 United States state legislative elections
- 2023 Louisiana House of Representatives election
