= Jane Smith =

Jane Smith may refer to:

== Sports ==
- Jane Smith (field hockey) (born 1969), British Olympic field hockey player
- Jane Smith (footballer), former association football player for New Zealand
- Jane Smith (diver) (born 1975), British Olympic diver

== Others ==
- Jane Lawrence (1915–2005), married name Jane Lawrence Smith, American actress and opera singer
- Hilda Worthington Smith (Jane Smith, 1888–1984), social worker and labor education specialist
- Jane Farwell Smith (1906–1997), American clubwoman
- Jane Idleman Smith, scholar of Islam
- Jane Stewart Smith, Scottish painter and draughtswoman
- Jane H. Smith (born 1948), Republican former member of the Louisiana House of Representatives
- Jane Norman Smith (1874–1953), American suffragist and reformer
- Jane Stuart Smith (1925–2016), American soprano, hymnologist, and author

== See also ==
- Sarah Jane Smith, fictional character from the Dr. Who TV series
- Jane Lomax-Smith (born 1950), South Australian politician
- Jane Slack-Smith (born 1966), Australian cyclist
- Jane Stuart-Smith, linguist and professor of sociolinguistics and phonetics
