= Louisiana's 6th House of Representatives district =

American legislative district

Louisiana's 6th State House of Representatives district
Representative
Michael Melerine; R–Shreveport

Louisiana's 6th House of Representatives district is one of 105 Louisiana House of Representatives districts. It is currently represented by Republican Michael Melerine of Shreveport.

== Geography ==
HD6 includes the neighbourhoods of Live Oak and Ellerbe Woods. Additionally, it includes part of the city of Shreveport.

== Election results ==
Year	Winning candidate	Party	Percent	Opponent	Party	Percent	Opponent	Party	Percent
2011	Thomas G. Carmody	Republican	100%						
2015	Thomas G. Carmody	Republican	100%						
2019	Thomas Pressly	Republican	100%						
2023	Michael Melerine	Republican	68.1%	Robert Darrow	Democratic	28.2	Evan McMichael	Independent	3.7%
