= Adam Bass (politician) =

American politician

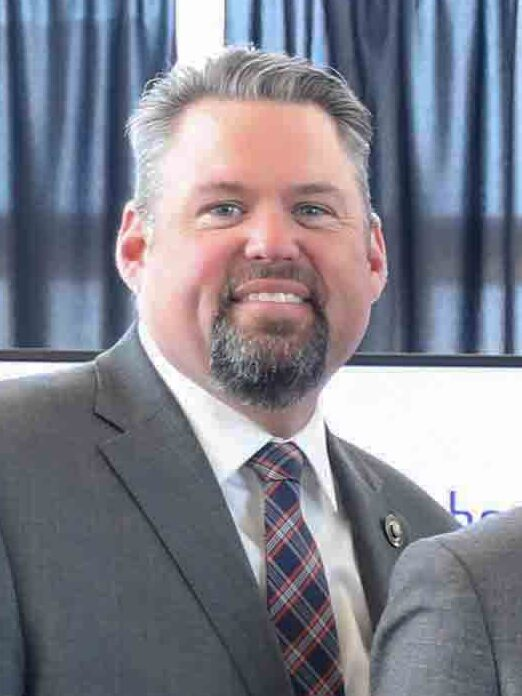
- Bass in 2025

Member of the Louisiana Senate from the 36th district
- Incumbent
- Assumed office January 8, 2024
- Preceded by: Robert Mills

Personal details
- Party: Republican
- Education: Louisiana Tech University (BS)
- Website: Campaign website

J. Adam Bass is an American politician who is the Senator for Louisiana's 36th State Senate district. He previously served on the Bossier Parish School Board. He is a member of the Republican Party.

== Early life and career ==
Bass grew up in Bossier Parish, Louisiana. He attended Airline High School and Louisiana Tech University. He continues to reside in Bossier and owns a local Allstate insurance agency.

== Political career ==
On August 20, 2019, Bass was selected to fill the remainder of Mike Mosura's term representing District 5 of the Bossier Parish School Board. Mosura had resigned after pleading guilty to charges of distributing anabolic steroids. There was a special election scheduled for April 4, 2020, to fill the remainder of Mosura's term, which Bass won unopposed. Bass served as the president of the school board in 2022. He was reelected uncontested in November 2022. During his time on the board, he opposed mask mandates.

Bass ran against incumbent Republican Robert Mills for the 36th district in the 2023 Louisiana State Senate election. He criticized Mills for being insufficiently conservative, in particular for voting for two spending bills that Bass viewed as unnecessary. Bass was endorsed by U.S. Senator John Kennedy. Bass won the election with 62% of the vote. Following his victory, Bass resigned from the Bossier Parish School Board in December 2023, leading to a 2024 special election for the remainder of his term that was won by Logan McConathy; in January 2024, Logan McConathy, an insurance agent, was appointed to hold the seat on an interim basis.

== Personal life ==
Bass lives in Bossier Parish, Louisiana. He has three children with his wife Britney. He is a member of the Rotary Club of Bossier City. Bass identifies as a Christian and is a member of the Cypress Baptist Church.

== Electoral history ==
2023 Louisiana's 36th State Senate district election
Primary election
Party	Candidate	Votes	%
Republican	Adam Bass	14,097	62.04%
Republican	Robert Mills (incumbent)	8,624	37.96%
Total votes		22,721	100.0
