= Ryan Gatti =

American politician

Ryan Eugene Gatti

Member of the Louisiana Senate from the 36th district
- In office January 11, 2016 – January 13, 2020
- Preceded by: Robert Adley
- Succeeded by: Robert Mills

Personal details
- Born: June 1974 (age 52) Bossier City, Louisiana, USA
- Party: Republican
- Spouse: Susan Lockhart Gatti
- Children: Rebecca Leigh Gatti (deceased); Katherine, Elizabeth, and Charlotte Gatti
- Parent(s): Robert and Jean Gatti
- Education: Airline High School; Louisiana State University; Louisiana State University Law Center
- Occupation: Lawyer; farmer

Ryan Eugene Gatti (born June 1974) is an attorney in his native Bossier City, Louisiana, who was a Republican member of the Louisiana Senate from 2016 until 2020 for District 36. Gatti served as vice-chairman of the Insurance Committee and on the Natural Resources Committee, Judiciary A Committee and Military Affairs.

== Legislation 2016–2018 ==
Gatti filed numerous bills during 2016, 2017 and 2018. SB 24 would have lowered taxes paid by individuals on oil and gas bonuses and royalties to "zero" but it failed to pass committee. Gatti partnered with Rep. Tanner Magee to file HB 220 which would have lowered the state portion of the sales tax from 5 percent to 3 percent; however this bill stalled in the House Committee.

=== 2016 Sessions ===
SB 33 which was signed into law made it a crime punishable by 10–50 years in prison and a $50,000.00 fine per instance for selling fetal organs as a result of an abortion. Over sixty legislators joined as co-author of the bill. As a result of his efforts, Gatti was recognized by Louisiana Family Forum with a "Life and Liberty Award."

SB 34 prohibited increase in motor vehicle premiums when a driver caused at accident with an uninsured motorists, however the bill stalled in committee. SB 35 required explosive companies to carry $50 million in liability coverage; however, the bill did not pass. This bill was filed in response to the bankruptcy of Explo, LLC after an explosion that occurred in Gatti's district.

SB 36 would have excluded doctors from the $500,000.00 medical malpractice cap for advertising as a specialist when they were not so certified.

SB 37 protected military families with special needs children when they relocated to Louisiana by putting those families as the front of the line for services for their children. The bill was converted to a study resolution informing military parents of other viable options with the Department of the Military.

SB 41 would have doubled supplemental pay for firefighters and police officers, but it did not pass out of committee.

SB 44 was signed into law and lowers workers' compensation rates for businesses is certain circumstances.

=== 2017 Sessions ===
SB 17 was signed into law and provided for training of drivers in appropriate behavior during traffic stops.

SB 63 was signed into law and provided insurance coverage for certain occupational diseases and cancers suffered by firefighters and related to their job duties.

SB 64 was signed into law and requires additional training and supervision of Animal Control employees.

=== 2018 Sessions ===
SB 73 was signed into law and created the "Fetal Organ Whistleblower Account" which provides compensation for whistleblowers who provide information of persons violating Louisiana Law prohibiting the sale of fetal organs from planned abortions.

SB 129 was signed into law and increased the age of eligibility for foster care from 18 until graduation from high school or 21 whichever occurs first. The bill was applauded as the "best bill of the session" by Gatti's colleague, Senator Ronnie Johns, R- Lake Charles.

SB 211 was signed into law and allowed courts to test biological parents for synthetic drugs before reuniting children in foster care with their parents.

SB 212 was signed into law and allows the Department of Transportation to rent or lease necessary equipment. Prior to this law, the department was only allowed to purchase equipment.

SB 299 did not pass, but it required that if one business receives a benefit from government, then all businesses receive the same benefit.

SB 319 was signed into law and abolished unnecessary and inactive boards and commissions.

SB 458 was signed into law and excluded First Degree Murderers from Medical Furlough. It also provided that notice must begin to all residents of a nursing home or hospital before an offender can be releasaed from prison to the facility. This bill was filed in response to a Medical Furlough request from a first degree murderer.

== Political career ==
Within 23 months of being sworn in, Gatti visited every school in his district delivering a Louisiana Flag to each school. Gatti has held over 50 town hall meetings from Plain Dealing and Castor to Springhill and Haughton. Gatti tells the story of the Mama Pelican on the Louisiana Flag.

In 2003, Gatti ran unsuccessfully for the District 8 seat in the Louisiana House of Representatives against fellow Republican Jane H. Smith, a former school superintendent for Bossier Parish. He received 3,456 votes (33.1 percent) to Smith's 6,999 (66.9 percent).

Twelve years later, Gatti narrowly defeated fellow Republican Henry Burns, a businessman and retired military officer originally from Webster Parish, who left the state House after two terms to seek the Senate seat vacated by the term-limited Republican Robert Adley. Gatti polled 14,023 votes (50.6 percent); Burns amassed 13,698 (49.4 percent).

Gatti ran for state senator as an intra-party critic of the term-limited Bobby Jindal, who as the departing governor launched a brief unsuccessful bid in the 2016 presidential campaign. Gatti is a close friend and supporter of Jindal's gubernatorial successor, Democrat John Bel Edwards of Tangipahoa Parish, whom Gatti met while attending LSU Law School. In 2014, Edwards delivered a campaign speech at Gatti's law office. Gatti was a large donor to Edwards as well despite his position as the vice president of the Bossier Parish Republican Party. U.S. Senator David Vitter, the Republican choice, lost the race for governor in 2015 to Edwards.

Upon his election, Gatti promised to work to halt Planned Parenthood from harvesting and selling organs from aborted children. He pledged to support higher education, to return local control to school boards, to eliminate the Common Core State Standards Initiative, to address state budgetary shortfalls, and to support policies to enhance Louisiana's energy industries.

In March 2016, Gatti joined the Senate majority, 29–10, to increase the state sales tax for five years, as proposed by Governor John Bel Edwards. A House and Senate conference committee subsequently trimmed the five years to twenty-seven months, from April 1, 2016, to June 30, 2018. Gatti voted against renewal of the sales tax in 2018 keeping a promise to his constituents.

In April 2018, upon the urging of Christian groups, Gatti voted against a bill which would have made it illegal to have sex with animals stating that the bill was simply a "Trojan horse" and that "the real purpose of the bill had nothing to do with bestiality." Several laws are already in place in Louisiana clearly making it illegal to commit this crime against the law this law was unnecessary. This bill was eventually passed only after it was not amended to change the remaining parts of the statute it was amending.

== Personal life ==
In 1992, Gatti graduated co-valedictorian of Airline High School in Bossier City. He then procured his undergraduate education in three years from Louisiana State University in the capital city of Baton Rouge, at which he was president of the fraternity, Kappa Sigma. Gatti attended the Honors College and was awarded Sophomore's Honors Distinction. Gatti was accepted to LSU Law Center serving as student body president and as student member to the Louisiana Board of Regents. While at Louisiana State University Law Center, he was a clerk to the state Senate. From 2007 to 2009, he was a judge of worker's compensation cases in Shreveport. He also owns and operates a farm near Plain Dealing in northern Bossier Parish, at which he grows oak trees. Gatti has operated his law firm since 2000.

The son of Robert and Jean Gatti, Senator Gatti has three brothers, Robbie and Jennifer Turner Gatti, Randy Gatti, and Regan Gatti. He is married to the former Susan Lockhart, formerly an assistant professor at the Louisiana State University Health Sciences Center Shreveport and previously the assistant headmaster at Providence Classical Academy in Bossier City. Susan Gatti received her PhD in psychology from LSU Baton Rouge and has published research in that area.(S.L. Gatti). The couple has three living daughters, Katherine, Elizabeth, and Charlotte Gatti. Another daughter, one of special needs since birth, Rebecca Leigh Gatti, died in 2017 at the age of ten. Rebecca's struggle with a brain injury caused by an avoidable medical error is chronicled in a family blog.

At the time of his legislative election, Gatti was on a Christian mission trip to Haiti. He has made such trips to El Salvador and Mexico as well. Since 2012, he has been a trustee of the Southern Baptist Convention's Ethics & Religious Liberty Commission.

Louisiana State Senate
Preceded by Robert Adley	Louisiana State Senator for District 36 (Bienville, Bossier, Claiborne, and Webster parishes); 2016 – 2020	Succeeded by Robert Mills
