= Louisiana's 37th State Senate district =

American legislative district

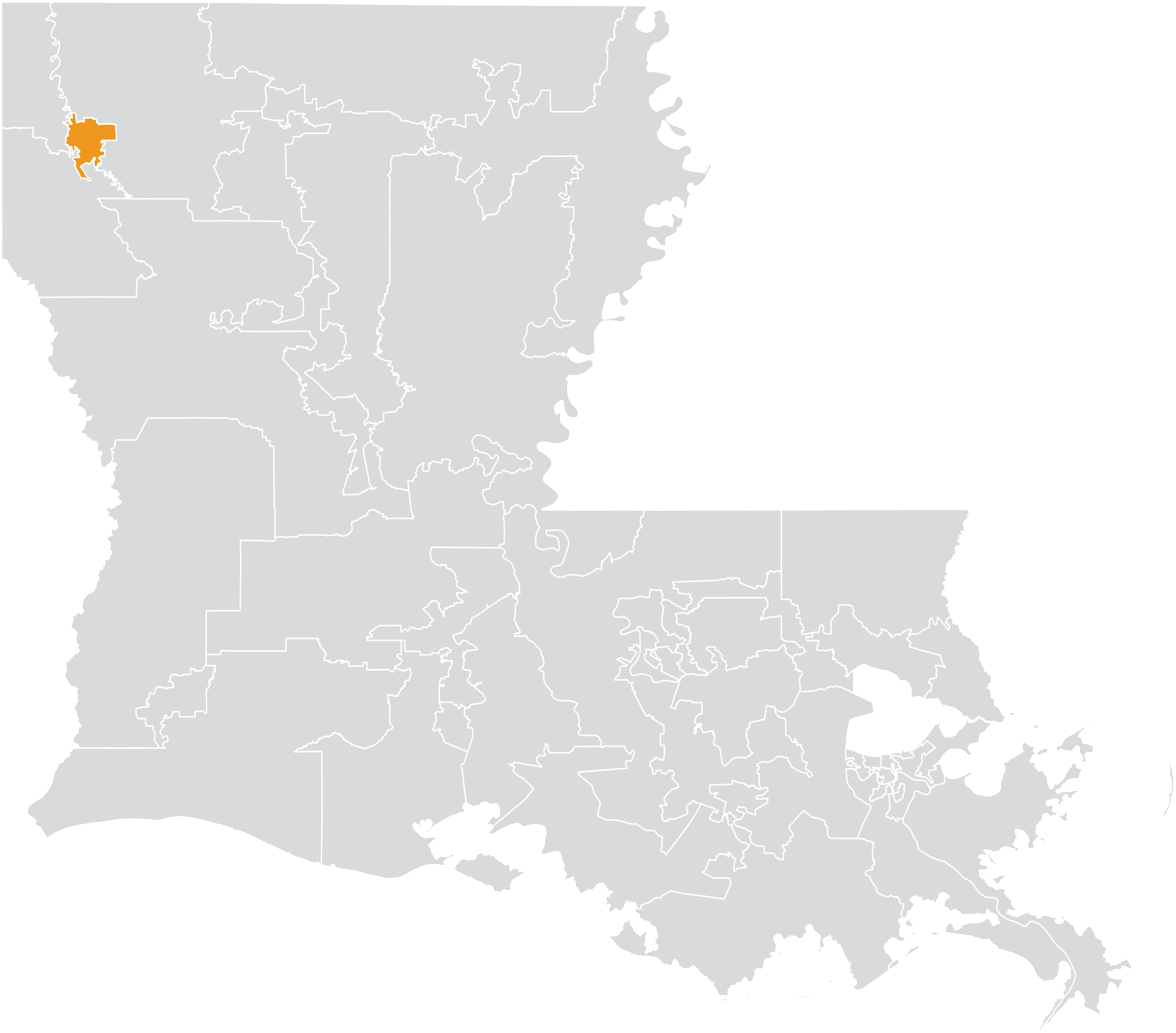
Senator
Barrow Peacock; R–Shreveport
- Registration: 39.1% Republican; 32.3% Democratic; 28.6% No party preference
- Demographics: 62% White; 26% Black; 7% Hispanic; 2% Asian; 2% Other
- Population (2019): 114,842
- Registered voters: 64,475

Louisiana's 37th State Senate district is one of 39 districts in the Louisiana State Senate. It has been represented by Republican Barrow Peacock since 2012.

== Geography ==
District 37 is evenly split between Bossier and Caddo Parishes in Ark-La-Tex, including parts of southern Shreveport and Bossier City.

The district is located entirely within Louisiana's 4th congressional district, and overlaps with the 2nd, 5th, 6th, 8th, and 9th districts of the Louisiana House of Representatives.

== Recent election results ==
Louisiana uses a jungle primary system. If no candidate receives 50% in the first round of voting, when all candidates appear on the same ballot regardless of party, the top-two finishers advance to a runoff election.

=== 2019 ===
2019 Louisiana State Senate election, District 37
Party	Candidate	Votes	%
Republican	Barrow Peacock (incumbent)	16,221	71.1
Independent	Debbie Hollis	6,593	28.9
Total votes		22,814	100
Republican hold			

=== 2015 ===
2015 Louisiana State Senate election, District 37
Party	Candidate	Votes	%
Republican	Barrow Peacock (incumbent)	Unopposed	100
Total votes		Unopposed	100
Republican hold			

=== 2011 ===
2011 Louisiana State Senate election, District 37
Party	Candidate	Votes	%
Republican	Barrow Peacock	10,331	55.5
Republican	Jane H. Smith	8,295	44.5
Total votes		18,626	100
Republican hold			

=== Federal and statewide results ===
Year	Office	Results
2020	President	Trump 58.6–39.1%
2019	Governor (runoff)	Rispone 56.2–43.8%
2016	President	Trump 61.8–33.3%
2015	Governor (runoff)	Vitter 55.0–45.0%
2014	Senate (runoff)	Cassidy 66.8–33.2%
2012	President	Romney 65.9–32.3%
