= Henry Newton Brown Jr. =

American judge (born 1941)

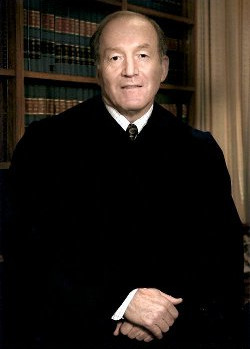
- Official portrait, 2010

Judge of the Louisiana 2nd Circuit Court of Appeal (now Chief Judge)
- In office 1991–2019
- Preceded by: Fred W. Jones Jr.
- Succeeded by: Jeff R. Thompson

District Attorney of the 26th Judicial District (Bossier and Webster parishes)
- In office 1975–1990
- Preceded by: Charles A. Marvin
- Succeeded by: James M. "Jim" Bullers

Personal details
- Born: Henry Newton Brown Jr. December 30, 1941 (age 84) Bienville Parish, Louisiana, US
- Party: Democratic
- Education: Bossier High School Louisiana State University Paul M. Hebert Law Center
- Occupation: Lawyer

Henry Newton Brown Jr. (born December 30, 1941) is an American jurist and politician who served on the Louisiana Second Circuit Court of Appeal from 1991 to 2019.

== Background ==
A native of Bienville Parish, Louisiana, Brown was reared in Bossier City. His parents were Henry Newton Brown, a civil engineer for the State of Louisiana for forty-four years, and the former Louise Craighead, who retired as a teacher from the Bossier Parish School Board.

Brown graduated from Bossier High School, where he was an All-American running back. In 1959, he went to Louisiana State University in Baton Rouge on a football scholarship.

In 1966, Brown graduated with his Juris Doctor degree from the Louisiana State University Law Center, where he studied under Paul M. Hebert, the namesake of the law institution. He joined the United States Army and served in the Special Forces in the Vietnam War. He was an Army instructor at the Infantry School at Fort Benning, Georgia, and a paratrooper in Vietnam from 1966 to 1968 with the 173rd Airborne Brigade Combat Team.

== Judicial career ==
After two years in the military, Brown in 1968 became an assistant district attorney in New Orleans under Jim Garrison. He moved back to Bossier City and was the chief assistant district attorney for the 26th Judicial District, which encompassed both Bossier and Webster parishes. When DA Charles A. Marvin of Minden was elected in 1975 to the Second Circuit Court of Appeal in Shreveport, Brown became the interim DA and then ran for the office in a special election held on October 2, 1976. In the following election, Brown defeated Glenn Armstrong, 13,854 votes (59.2 percent) to 9,557 (40.8 percent).

DA Brown was known for his determined prosecution of murder cases. He sent five persons convicted of murder to the electric chair. For this role, he was featured in episodes of CBS's 60 Minutes and the Fox Channel's The Reporters. The magazine The Angolite, published at Louisiana State Penitentiary in Angola, referred to Brown as "The Deadliest Prosecutor".

One of the Brown prosecutors was overturned by the Louisiana Supreme Court. In 1986, Brown was the district attorney in State of Louisiana v. James M. Monds, referring to James Marvin Monds (born December 1963) of Keithville in Caddo Parish. At the time, Monds, a surgical technician at Barksdale Air Force Base was convicted of the murder the preceding summer of Vicki Thomas, who was raped, assaulted, mutilated, and killed at a parking lot at Parkway High School in Bossier City. Monds became the key suspect when his vehicle, a Ford Bronco, was identified as the one at the scene of the murder. Monds testified that he had never met Thomas and had no knowledge of her death but had cut his hand while working on a flat tire the night of the crime. The Louisiana Supreme Court, which heard the case after the Second Circuit Court of Appeals recused itself, ruled in 1994 that insufficient evidence, most of a circumstantial nature, existed to continue to incarcerate Monds. He was therefore declared "acquitted" and released after serving nearly nine years in prison.

John Milkovich, elected in 2015 as a member of the Louisiana State Senate, was then Monds' attorney. He accused both DA Brown and the presiding judge in the case, Graydon K. Kitchens, Jr., of Minden in Webster Parish of serious legal errors in the case. Milkovich accused Judge Kitchens of trying to block testimony which would have cleared Monds, and he accused Brown and Monds' former wife, Shea, of plotting the killing of Thomas. The charge against Brown was quickly repudiated by James Bullers, who succeeded Brown as district attorney of Bossier and Webster parishes. In a rebuke of Milkovich, Bullers said, "The theory was and is so ridiculous that it's almost unbelievable. I personally believe that Milkovich is totally obsessed with Henry Brown. I really don't know if he believes it himself."

In September 1984, Brown narrowly won reelection as district attorney over State Representative Bruce M. Bolin of Minden, the son of Judge James E. Bolin and himself later a judge of the 26th Judicial District. Brown prevailed by 122 votes; the tally was 16,447 for Brown to 16,326 for Bolin. Bolin carried forty-one of the forty-eight precincts in Webster Parish but only two in Bossier Parish, which made Brown's reelection possible. In that campaign, Bolin accused Brown of having dropped 230 charges against suspects, including some who were accused of rape, narcotics violations, and driving while intoxicated. Bolin also said that Brown had not adequately prosecuted murder cases.

In 1990, after some fifteen years as district attorney, Brown was elected to the Louisiana 2nd Circuit Court of Appeal seated vacated by the retiring Fred W. Jones Jr. of Ruston, Louisiana. He defeated fellow Democrat Jean Talley Drew of Minden, the wife of Judge Harmon Drew Jr., Brown's judicial colleague. Brown polled 48,935 votes (57.5 percent) to Drew's 36,217 (42.5 percent).

Henry Brown was the Chief Judge of the Louisiana Second Circuit Court of Appeals in Shreveport. He was reelected to the Circuit Court in 2000 and 2010, when he was unopposed. His final term extended until December 31, 2020. He served his third and final term under current age requirements for state judges.

Legal offices
Preceded by Charles A. Marvin	District Attorney of Bossier and Webster parishes, Louisiana; 1975–1990	Succeeded by James M. "Jim" Bullers
Preceded by Fred W. Jones Jr.	Judge of the Louisiana Second Circuit Court of Appeal; 1991–2019	Succeeded by Jeff R. Thompson
