= Robert Adley =

Robert Adley may refer to:

- Robert Adley (American politician) (born 1947), member of the Louisiana state legislature
- Robert Adley (British politician) (1935–1993), politician and railway enthusiast
