= Jeff R. Thompson =

American politician

Jefferson Rowe Thompson

Member of Louisiana’s 2nd Circuit Court of Appeal
- Incumbent
- Assumed office April 29, 2019
- Preceded by: Henry Newton Brown Jr.

Member of Louisiana’s 26th Judicial District Court
- In office 2015–2019
- Preceded by: Ford E. Stinson Jr.
- Succeeded by: Charles A. Smith

Member of the Louisiana House of Representatives from the 8th district
- In office 2012–2015
- Preceded by: Jane H. Smith
- Succeeded by: Mike Johnson

Personal details
- Born: Jefferson Rowe Thompson; March 10, 1965 (age 61) Alexandria, Louisiana, U.S.
- Party: Republican
- Spouse: Toni Estelle Hurst Thompson
- Children: 2
- Education: University of Louisiana at Monroe; Tulane University School of Law
- Occupation: Lawyer and Judge
- Website: Office website

Jefferson Rowe Thompson, known as Jeff R. Thompson (born March 10, 1965), is an American lawyer serving as a judge for Louisiana’s 2nd Circuit Court of Appeal since 2019. A member of the Republican Party, he served on Louisiana’s 26th Judicial District Court from 2015 to 2019, and in the Louisiana House of Representatives from 2012 to 2015.

In a special election on March 30, 2019, he was elected with 76% of the vote to the Second Circuit Court of Appeal for the remainder of an unexpired term. In November, 2020, he was elected without opposition to a full 10-year term at the Second Circuit Court of Appeal, which serves Louisiana's twenty northernmost parishes from Texas to Mississippi.

== Political life ==
Thompson was elected to the House in 2011, when the term-limited incumbent, fellow Republican Jane H. Smith of Bossier City, ran instead, unsuccessfully, for the Louisiana State Senate. Thompson defeated fellow Republican, Michael Durrell "Duke" Lowrie (born April 1970), 4,991 (56.8 percent) to 3,803 (43.3 percent). Smith, meanwhile, was defeated by the Republican businessman Barrow Peacock of Shreveport for the Senate seat vacated by B. L. "Buddy" Shaw.

In 2008, Thompson was an unsuccessful candidate for the United States House of Representatives for Louisiana's 4th congressional district. The seat opened when the incumbent Jim McCrery stepped down to become a lobbyist. Thompson finished in third place in the primary. The position went to the Republican physician and businessman John C. Fleming of Minden who held it until 2017.

In the spring of 2012, Representative Thompson amended an anti-bullying bill sponsored by Patricia Smith, a Democrat from Baton Rouge. Conservative opponents of the bill claimed the measure is at odds with freedom of speech rulings by the United States Supreme Court. Thompson offered an amendment, which removed those sections of the bill that specify prohibitions against bullying in regard to only sexual orientation, disabilities, and race. Smith said that the Thompson amendment effectively killed the focus of the legislation, and she withdrew it from further consideration. Thompson opposed bullying in schools for any reason and worked to protect the educational opportunities of all children.

Representative Thompson served on the House Education, Homeland Security, Ways and Means, and Military and Veterans Affairs committees. He also sits on the Joint House and Senate Committee on Homeland Security. Thompson was a leader in the Louisiana legislature to address the over 17 million pounds of propellant improperly and illegally stored at Camp Minden near Doyline, Louisiana.

His successor, Mike Johnson, was later elected to the US House of Representatives for Louisiana’s 4th congressional district and is the current speaker of the House.

== Court activities ==
Louisiana House of Representatives
| Preceded by Jane H. Smith | Louisiana State Representative from District 8 (Bossier Parish); 2012–2015 | Succeeded by Mike Johnson |
| Preceded by Ford E. Stinson Jr. | Judge of Division B of the Louisiana 26th Judicial District Court; 2015–2019 | Succeeded by Charles A. Smith |
