= Robert Mills (Louisiana politician) =

American politician

Member of the Louisiana Senate from the 36th district
- In office January 13, 2020 – January 8, 2024
- Preceded by: Ryan Gatti
- Succeeded by: Adam Bass

Personal details
- Party: Republican
- Spouse: Sheila
- Children: 4
- Education: Louisiana State University (BA)
- Website: Campaign website

Robert M. Mills is an American politician from the state of Louisiana. A Republican, Mills represented the 36th district of the Louisiana State Senate, based in the exurbs of Shreveport and Bossier City, from 2020 to 2024.

Mills is a vice president at Calumet Lubricants Company, where he has worked since 1993. In 2019, Mills successfully challenged incumbent Republican state senator Ryan Gatti, defeating him with 56% of the vote in the runoff election.
