= B. L. Shaw =

American politician (1933–2018)

Bernice Lorene "Buddy" Shaw

Louisiana State Senator for District 37 (Caddo and Bossier parishes)
- In office 2008–2012
- Preceded by: Max T. Malone
- Succeeded by: Barrow Peacock

Louisiana State Representative for District 6 (Caddo Parish)
- In office 1996–2004
- Preceded by: Melissa Scott Flournoy
- Succeeded by: Michael Powell

Personal details
- Born: September 6, 1933 Jamestown, Bienville Parish, Louisiana, USA
- Died: January 18, 2018 (aged 84)
- Resting place: Providence Cemetery in Ringgold in Bienville Parish
- Party: Republican
- Spouse: Mary Ann Shaw
- Children: Daughter Stephanie Shaw; Stepson Edward Neff Minor, III, (1963–1995)
- Parent(s): Levia Watson "Levi" Shaw (1898-1958); Ida Nix Shaw (1898-1984)
- Education: Northwestern State University; Louisiana State University
- Occupation: Educator

Military service
- Branch/service: United States Army

Bernice Lorene Shaw (also known as B. L. "Buddy" Shaw; September 6, 1933 – January 18, 2018), was a Louisiana educator and politician who served in the Louisiana State Senate.

Shaw died early in 2018 at the age of eighty-four, and was interred at Providence Cemetery in Ringgold, Louisiana.

Caddo Parish School Superintendent T. Lamar Goree described Shaw as "undoubtedly a legend in our district and a man who set C. E. Byrd apart from the crowd. He was a career educator who loved the students of this district and spent his life in service to the community. ... his legacy will long be remembered."

}

Louisiana House of Representatives
Preceded by Melissa Scott Flournoy	Louisiana State Representative for District 6 (Caddo and Bossier parishes); Bernice Lorene "Buddy" Shaw; 1996–2004	Succeeded by Mike Powell
Louisiana State Senate
Preceded by Max Tatum Malone	Louisiana State Senator for District 37 (Caddo and Bossier parishes); Bernice Lorene "Buddy" Shaw; 2008–2012	Succeeded by Barrow Peacock
