= Barrow Peacock =

American politician (born 1970)

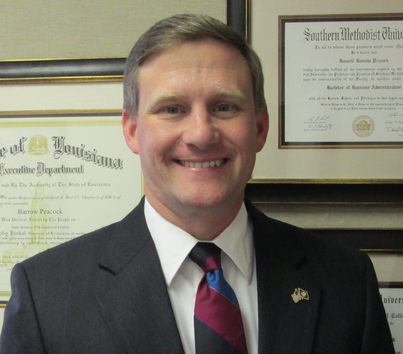

Member of the Louisiana Senate from the 37th district
- In office January 2012 – January 2024
- Preceded by: B. L. Shaw
- Succeeded by: Bill Wheat

Personal details
- Born: Russell Barrow Peacock; March 19, 1970 (age 56) Shreveport, Louisiana, U.S.
- Party: Republican
- Education: Southern Methodist University (BBA); Louisiana State University (MBA)

Russell Barrow Peacock (born March 19, 1970) is a former Republican state senator for District 37 in northwestern Louisiana.

A native of Shreveport, Peacock is a businessman and former elected member of the Louisiana State Republican Central Committee.

== Education and career ==
Peacock was born in Shreveport to John William "Bill" Peacock (1931–2012) and the former Sidney Barrow. John Peacock graduated from Louisiana State University in Baton Rouge, served in the United States Air Force in England, and was the president until his retirement in 1998 of Peacock Surgical and Company in Shreveport. Barrow Peacock's paternal grandparents were William Arnold Peacock and the former Mattie Williams. Peacock has a sister, Martha Peacock Ross and her husband, Lew.

Peacock earned a Bachelor of Business Administration degree from Southern Methodist University. He also holds a Master of Business Administration degree from LSU in Baton Rouge.

Peacock is a partner at BHP Properties, a Shreveport investments and real estate firm. He has also served on the board of directors at the Christus Schumpert Health System Foundation and the Louisiana Association for the Blind. He was the finance chairman at the Biomedical Research Foundation of Northwest Louisiana. He is a notary public in Louisiana and holds a license in real estate.

== Early political career ==
Before he was elected to the state senate, Peacock ran four unsuccessful campaigns for both houses of the Louisiana State Legislature. He persisted, gaining more popular vote each time that he ran.

== Louisiana State Senate ==
On May 24, 2011, Peacock announced his second campaign for the District 37 senate seat. The incumbent B. L. Shaw, a retired educator from Shreveport elected in 2007, decided not to seek a second term. A term-limited state representative, Jane H. Smith, another retired educator, was Peacock's principal primary challenger in the heavily Republican district. Smith received the endorsement of Governor Bobby Jindal, who himself was reelected in the 2011 primary. The 37th district comprises sections of Shreveport and Bossier City.

Peacock went on to win the election against Smith with 55 percent of the vote. Shaw described Peacock's win as a "David-versus-Goliath victory" because Smith had carried Jindal's backing.

As a newly elected senator, Peacock voted against then Governor Jindal's choice for Senate President, John Alario of Westwego in Jefferson Parish. Peacock's rationale for opposing Alario is that he had promised constituents that he would not vote to confirm Alario. Previously, Alario was twice Speaker of the Louisiana House of Representatives under the Edwin Edwards administration. Alario assigned Peacock to the Retirement and Labor committees.

After his first session, Peacock achieved a 100 percent Outstanding Family Advocate Award from the Louisiana Family Forum, a 100 percent scorecard from the Louisiana Association of Business and Industry, a 100 percent rating from the Federation of Independent Business in Louisiana and an A+ from the Louisiana Sheriff's Association.

In January 2016, Senate President John Alario appointed Peacock, his former intraparty rival, as chairman of the Senate Retirement Committee.

Conservative radio talk show host Moon Griffon of Lafayette has frequently ridiculed Peacock on Griffon's program because of Peacock's since close ties to Alario. Griffon mimics a bird to show what he considers Peacock's subservience to Alario. Moreover, Griffon is critical of all of the Republican state senators for what he considers their lack of legislative independence and willingness to approve higher taxes. However, Griffon noted thereafter that Peacock was one of only two state senators to oppose a budget change in 2017 requested by Democratic Governor John Bel Edwards and backed by Alario. Lawmakers voted to take $99 million from the "rainy day" fund for use in closing a $304 million projected deficit.

== Personal life ==
Peacock is married to the former Melanie Fuller and has three sons. He is a former auxiliary deputy sheriff in Caddo Parish. He and his family are members of the First Methodist Church in Shreveport.
