= The Bossier Strip =

Entertainment district

Coordinates: 32.528°N 93.719°W

The Bossier Strip is the name for an entertainment district in Bossier City, Louisiana, that is widely known for its nightclubs, bars, strip joints, restaurants, gambling, prostitution, and live music.

The "Strip," as called by the locals, begins at the eastern terminus of the Texas Street Bridge which connects Shreveport and Bossier City (the bridge was completed in the 1930s by then Governor O.K. Allen). The Strip was most popular as an entertainment destination between the 1940s and the 1970s. The Strip begins at the foot of the Texas Street Bridge and extends East to Louisiana Downs racetrack near Red Chute Bayou. The heart of the Strip, where the majority of clubs were located at the height of its popularity, was from the Texas Street Bridge to Swan Lake Road. Gambling was legalized in the state in 1990 leading to the development of casinos along the Red River and the eventual decline of the Bossier Strip as a focus for entertainment.

The Strip has been the home of bars and brothels almost since the incorporation of the city in 1907. From about 1930 through the late 1940s the Bossier Strip was as popular an entertainment destination as Las Vegas, having been around for many years prior to the establishment of Las Vegas as a gambling mecca.

The Strip has been the object of political disputes too. In 1972, then Mayor George Nattin fired Police Chief Bobby Joe Almond over what Almond claimed was a dispute over enforcement of after-hours policies for nightclubs on The Strip.

The Bossier Strip is also located in what musicians once called the Magic Circle, an area described by Tillman Franks as an area 50-miles in radius from downtown Shreveport from which many kinds of music evolved. This area has produced an inordinate number of musical performers that have attained high acclaim for their music. The list of performers who were either born in the area, or who got their start in music in the area, includes such notables as James Burton, Lead Belly, Slim Whitman, Van Cliburn, Tillman Franks, Webb Pierce, Faron Young, Hank Williams, Hank Williams Jr., Johnny Horton, Elvis Presley, John Campbell, Dale Hawkins, Merle Kilgore, and Johnny Cash.

== See also ==
- List of people from Shreveport
