= Sherri Smith Buffington =

American politician

Member of the Louisiana State Senate from the 38th district
- In office 2004 – January 11, 2016
- Preceded by: Ron Bean
- Succeeded by: John Milkovich

Personal details
- Party: Republican
- Spouse: Joe Buffington (died 2021)
- Education: Centenary College of Louisiana; Louisiana State University

Sherri Smith Buffington is an American politician. She served as a Republican member for the 38th district of the Louisiana State Senate from 2003 to 2016.

Buffington attended Centenary College of Louisiana and Louisiana State University. From 1992 to 2003 she was legislative assistant to senator Ron Bean.
