= Michael Powell (Louisiana politician) =

American politician

Member of the Louisiana House of Representatives from the 6th district
- In office January 2004 – December 2007
- Preceded by: B. L. Shaw
- Succeeded by: Thomas G. Carmody

Personal details
- Party: Republican
- Education: Louisiana State University

Michael Powell is an American politician. He served as a Republican member for the 6th district of the Louisiana House of Representatives.

Powell attended Louisiana State University, where he earned his bachelor's degree in geology. In 1992, he attended the Paul M. Hebert Law Center, where he earned his Juris Doctor degree. In 2004, Powell won the election for the 6th district of the Louisiana House of Representatives. He succeeded B. L. Shaw. In 2007, Powell resigned from the state legislature.

Powell served as a lawyer in Shreveport, Louisiana.
