= Jane Smith (footballer) =

New Zealand footballer

Personal information
- Full name: Jane Smith

International career
Years	Team	Apps	(Gls)
1994	New Zealand	1	(0)

Jane Smith is a former association football player who represented New Zealand at international level.

Smith made a single appearance for Football Ferns in a 0–1 loss to Russia on 28 August 1994.
