= Airline High School =

Secondary school in Bossier City, Louisiana, United States

Location
- 2801 Airline Drive; Bossier City, Louisiana 71111; United States; 32°33′12″N 93°42′41″W

Information
- Type: Public secondary school
- Motto: "Valor Unconquered"
- School district: Bossier Parish Schools
- Superintendent: Jason Rowland
- Principal: Seth Stowell
- Teaching staff: 107.75 (on an FTE basis)
- Grades: 9–12
- Enrollment: 1,866 (2024-2025)
- Student to teacher ratio: 18.11
- Colors: Navy and Columbia blue
- Mascot: Vikings
- Nickname: Vikings
- Rival: Parkway and Benton
- Yearbook: Valhalla
- Website: airline.bossierschools.org/o/ahs

Airline High School is a secondary school located in Bossier City, Louisiana, United States.

In addition to sections of Bossier City, the school's attendance boundary includes a portion of the Red Chute census-designated place.

== Athletics ==
Airline High athletics competes in the LHSAA.

=== Championships ===
Football Championships

- (1) State Championship: 1967

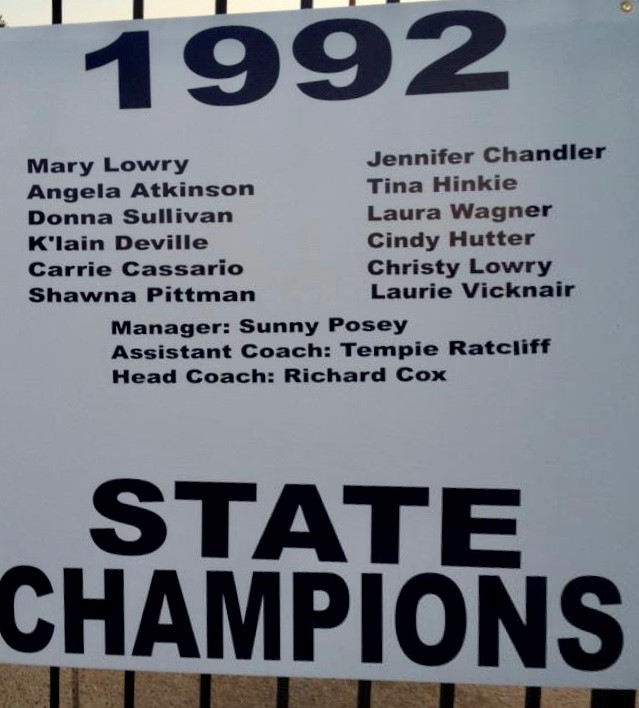

Basketball Championships

- (1) Girls’ Basketball: 1992 (first girls' basketball 5-A state champions in LHSAA history)

== Notable alumni ==
- Robert Adley, businessperson and politician
- Kenny Darby, college football player
- Ryan Gatti, Robert Adley's successor as state senator for District 36 since 2016; Bossier City lawyer
- Josh Hagins, basketball player
- Larry Robinson, former professional basketball player
- David Toms, professional golfer
- Milo Clark, Founder of Pegasus Laboratories
- Byron Smith, former professional NBA player (Houston Rockets) and Head Basketball Coach Prairie View A&M
- Todd Walker, former Major League Baseball player
- Alan Wheat, politician
- BJ Ryan, former Major League Baseball player
