= Jane Stuart-Smith =

English sociolinguist and phonetician

Jane Helen Stuart-Smith is a linguist and professor of sociolinguistics and phonetics at the University of Glasgow. She is recognised as a specialist in the dialects of Glasgow.

In 1998 she established the Glasgow University Laboratory of Phonetics (GULP), which she is still co-directing.

== Biography ==
Stuart-Smith studied at University College London (UCL) and Oxford University, where she graduated with an M.Phil in General Linguistics and Comparative Philology in 1991. Following this, she studied for a PhD in Historical Phonology at Oxford University, completing her dissertation in 1996. She became professor of phonetics and sociolinguistics at the University of Glasgow in 2013.

== Research ==
Stuart-Smith's research focusses on the interface of speech and society. She published articles on the variation and phonetics of a number of languages and accents, including the Glaswegian accent and British varieties of Panjabi. Additionally, she is interested in media influence on language change, on which she taught a course at the 2015 Linguistic Summer Institute, hosted by the University of Chicago. To advance mainstream education on speech and accents, Stuart-Smith also co-developed the website Seeing Speech.

== Honours and organisational work ==
- Member of the council of the International Phonetic Association for two periods (2015–2023)
- Fellow of the Royal Society of Edinburgh (2018)
- President of the Association for Laboratory Phonology (2022)
- UK fellow of the British Academy (2023)
