= Michael Melerine =

American politician

Member of the Louisiana House of Representatives from the 6th district
- Incumbent
- Assumed office January 8, 2024
- Preceded by: Thomas Pressly

Personal details
- Party: Republican
- Education: Louisiana State University

Michael Melerine is an American politician serving as a member of the Louisiana House of Representatives from the 6th district, representing Bossier Parish and Caddo Parish. He assumed office on January 8, 2024.

== Career ==
Melerine is a former member of the Louisiana Board of Elementary and Secondary Education District 4. His wife, Stacey Melerine, won the subsequent election to replace him. He was elected to the 6th district seat in the Louisiana House of Representatives with 68.1% of the vote on October 14, 2023, with Robert Darrow in second with 28.2% and Evan McMichael in third with 3.7%.
