= Louisiana's 36th State Senate district =

American legislative district

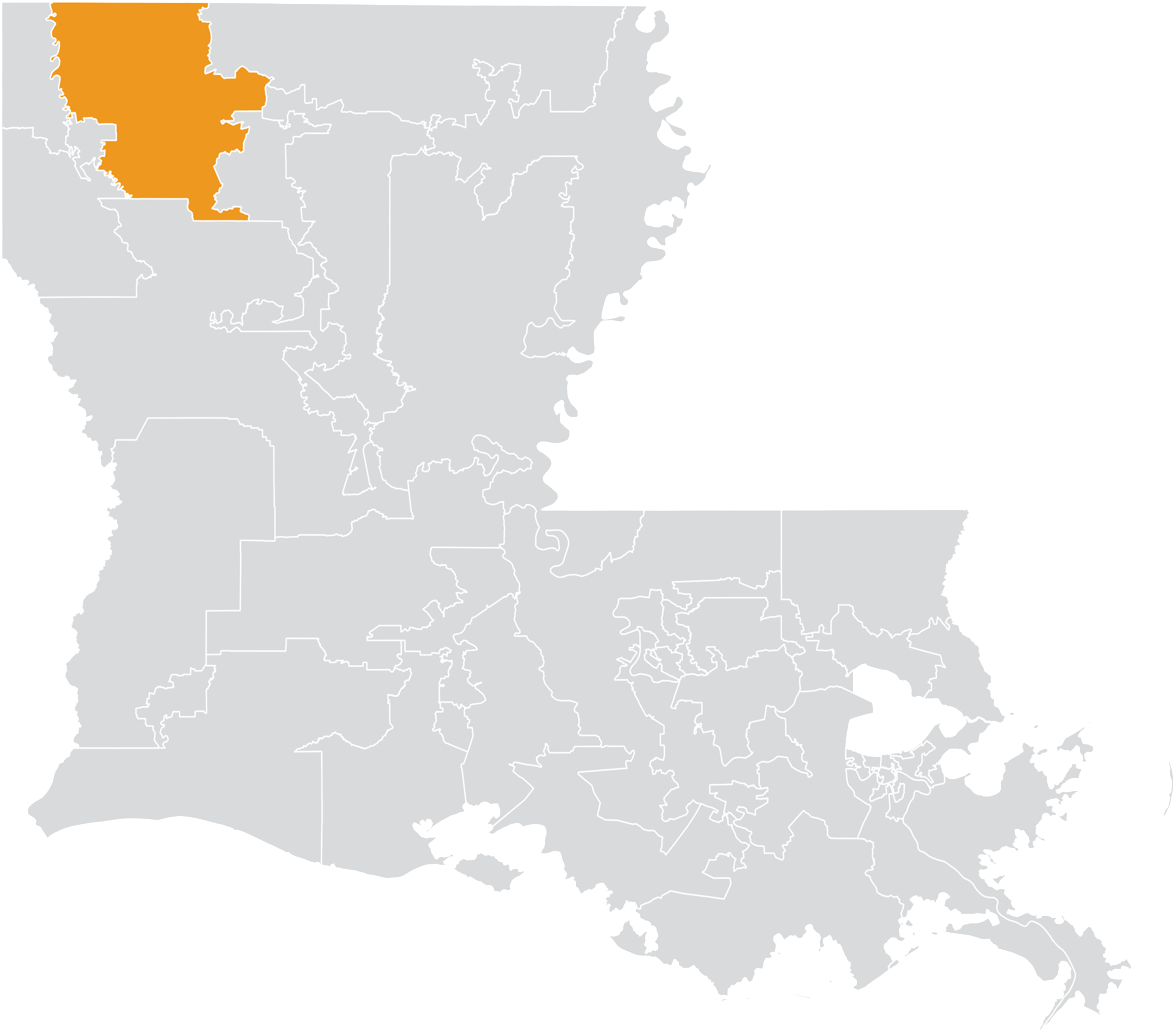
Senator
Robert Mills; R–Shreveport
- Registration: 44.0% Republican; 31.3% Democratic; 24.7% No party preference
- Demographics: 71% White; 23% Black; 3% Hispanic; 1% Asian; 1% Other
- Population (2019): 111,746
- Registered voters: 72,879

Louisiana's 36th State Senate district is one of 39 districts in the Louisiana State Senate. It has been represented by Republican Robert Mills since 2020, following his 2019 defeat of Republican incumbent Ryan Gatti.

== Geography ==
District 36 covers all of Webster Parish and parts of Bienville, Bossier, and Claiborne Parishes in eastern Ark-La-Tex, including some or all of Ringgold, Springhill, Minden, Plain Dealing, Benton, Haughton, Eastwood, Red Chute, and Bossier City.

The district is located entirely within Louisiana's 4th congressional district, and overlaps with the 1st, 8th, 9th, 10th, 11th, and 13th districts of the Louisiana House of Representatives.

== Recent election results ==
Louisiana uses a jungle primary system. If no candidate receives 50% in the first round of voting, when all candidates appear on the same ballot regardless of party, the top-two finishers advance to a runoff election.

=== 2019 ===
2019 Louisiana State Senate election, District 36
Primary election
Party	Candidate	Votes	%
Republican	Robert Mills	16,305	47.7
Republican	Ryan Gatti (incumbent)	12,882	37.7
Democratic	Mattie Preston	4,976	14.6
Total votes		34,163	100
General election
Republican	Robert Mills	22,050	56.2
Republican	Ryan Gatti (incumbent)	17,209	43.8
Total votes		39,259	100
Republican hold			

=== 2015 ===
2015 Louisiana State Senate election, District 36
Primary election
Party	Candidate	Votes	%
Republican	Henry Lee Burns	10,202	40.3
Republican	Ryan Gatti	8,649	34.2
Democratic	Todd Hollenshead	6,465	25.5
Total votes		25,316	100
General election
Republican	Ryan Gatti	14,023	50.6
Republican	Henry Lee Burns	13,698	49.4
Total votes		27,721	100
Republican hold			

=== 2011 ===
2011 Louisiana State Senate election, District 36
Party	Candidate	Votes	%
Republican	Robert Adley (incumbent)	Unopposed	100
Total votes		Unopposed	100
Republican hold			

=== Federal and statewide results ===
Year	Office	Results
2020	President	Trump 72.8–25.9%
2019	Governor (runoff)	Rispone 66.6–33.4%
2016	President	Trump 72.1–25.4%
2015	Governor (runoff)	Vitter 58.8–41.2%
2014	Senate (runoff)	Cassidy 69.5–30.5%
2012	President	Romney 70.9–28.1%

== See also ==
- Harold Montgomery
- Jack Montgomery
