= Thomas G. Carmody =

American politician (born 1961)

Thomas Carmody

Member of the Louisiana House of Representatives from the 6th district
- In office January 2008 – January 14, 2020
- Preceded by: Michael Powell
- Succeeded by: Thomas Pressly

Personal details
- Born: Thomas Gaughan Carmody Jr. April 20, 1961 (age 65) Shreveport, Louisiana, U.S.
- Party: Republican
- Spouse: Wendy Williamson Carmody
- Children: 1
- Education: Louisiana State University (BFA)

Thomas Gaughan Carmody Jr. (born April 20, 1961), is an American real estate broker and former politician from Shreveport, Louisiana who served as a member of the Louisiana House of Representatives for the 6th district from 2008 to 2020.

== Early life and education ==
Carmody is one of thirteen children, eleven still living as of 2018, of Thomas Gaughan Carmody Sr. (1932–2012), and the former Katherine Phelan (1932–2026).

In 1979, Carmody graduated from the Roman Catholic Jesuit High School in Shreveport, now Loyola College Prep. In 1983, Carmody received the Bachelor of Fine Arts degree from Louisiana State University in Baton Rouge.

== Career ==
=== Louisiana House of Representatives ===
Carmody served as Chairman of House Commerce Committee, having previously served on Commerce, Education, and the Municipal, Parochial, and Cultural Affairs committees. Carmody's biggest donors in his initial election were the Republican Party, the Louisiana Association of Educators, and the Louisiana Hospital Association.

Louisiana House of Representatives
Preceded by Mike Powell	Louisiana State Representative for District 6 (Caddo and Bossier parishes); Thomas Gaughan Carmody, Jr. 2008–	Succeeded by Incumbent
