= Barry Milligan =

American politician and banker

Barry S. Milligan

Member of the Louisiana Senate from the 38th district
- In office January 13, 2020 – January 8, 2024
- Preceded by: John Milkovich
- Succeeded by: Thomas Pressly

Personal details
- Born: Rayne, Louisiana, U.S.
- Party: Republican
- Children: 2
- Education: Southeastern Louisiana University (BBM); Centenary College of Louisiana (MBA)

Barry S. Milligan is an American politician and banker from the state of Louisiana. A Republican, Milligan represented the 38th district of the Louisiana State Senate, based in southern Shreveport, from 2020 to 2024.

== Career ==
Milligan has held positions at a variety of banking institutions, including Regions Financial Corporation, BancorpSouth, Home Federal Bank, and the Bank of Montgomery. Since 2019 he has served as owner of Louisiana Business Consulting, LLC, which he also founded.

== Political history ==
In 2019, Milligan announced a run for State Senate against Democratic incumbent John Milkovich, who had garnered blowback for his unscientific comments on vaccinations and autism. Milligan defeated Milkovich and another Democrat with 51% of the vote in the first round.
