= Jane Stewart Smith =

Edinburgh-based painter and draughtswoman

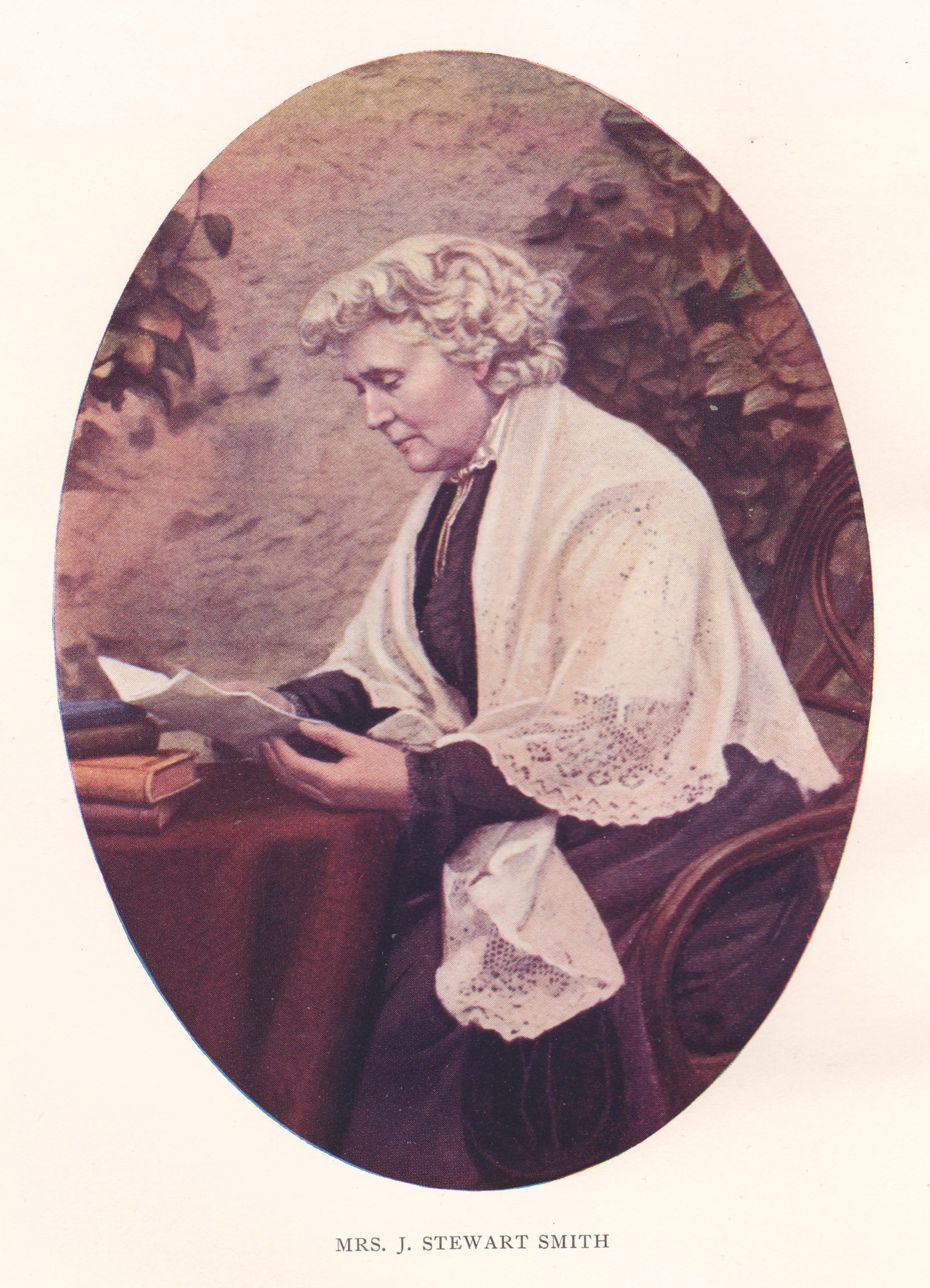
Mrs. J. Stewart Smith (n.d.)

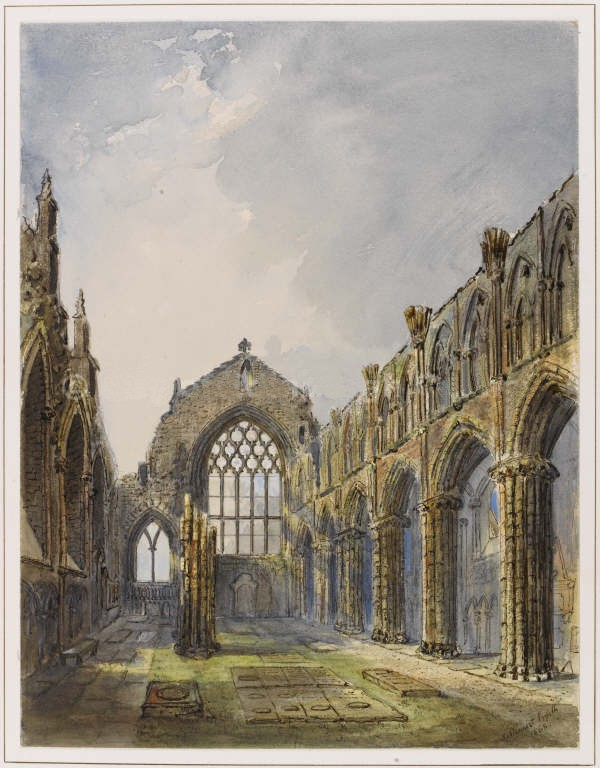
The ruin of Holyrood Abbey with the remaining arches, columns and windows (1868)

Jane Stewart Smith (née Burnet(t); c. 1839–1925) was a Scottish painter and draughtswoman, based in Edinburgh.

== Art ==
Jane Stewart Smith possessed a talent for architectural studies. She produced scenes of street life, building studies, and landscapes, in oils and watercolours. She also produced drawings.

She exhibited for over twenty years, including at the Royal Scottish Academy (49 pictures, 1865–87), the Royal Glasgow Institute (1866–82), the Royal Hibernian Academy (1869), and the Society of Women Artists (37 pictures, 1869–87).

Her exhibited works included: Melrose Abbey, Ancient Houses, Edinburgh, Canal Scene, Chester, and Bit of Leith Harbour.

== Writing ==
She was also the author of two books:

- The Grange of St Giles. Edinburgh: T. & A. Constable, 1898;
- Historic Stones of Bygone Edinburgh. Edinburgh: T. & A. Constable, 1924.
