= Thomas Pressly =

American politician

Member of the Louisiana Senate from the 38th district
- Incumbent
- Assumed office January 8, 2024
- Preceded by: Barry Milligan

Member of the Louisiana House of Representatives from the 6th district
- In office January 13, 2020 – January 8, 2024
- Preceded by: Thomas G. Carmody
- Succeeded by: Michael Melerine

Personal details
- Born: Thomas Alexander Pressly IV
- Party: Republican
- Spouse: Maggie
- Children: 2
- Education: Texas Christian University (BS); Loyola University New Orleans (JD)

Thomas Alexander Pressly IV is an American attorney and politician serving as a member of the Louisiana Senate from the 38th district since 2024. He previously represented the 6th district in the Louisiana House of Representatives from 2020 to 2024.

== Education ==
Pressly graduated from C. E. Byrd High School in 2005. He earned a Bachelor of Science degree from Texas Christian University in 2009 and a Juris Doctor from the Loyola University New Orleans College of Law in 2013.

== Career ==
In 2013 and 2014, Pressly served as a law clerk for S. Maurice Hicks Jr. He has since worked as a civil litigation attorney. He was elected to the Louisiana House of Representatives in November 2019 and assumed office on January 13, 2020.
