= Robert Adley (American politician) =

American politician (born 1947)

Member of the Louisiana State Senate for District 36
- In office 2003–2016

Member of the Louisiana House of Representatives
- In office 1979–1995

Personal details
- Born: September 3, 1947 (age 78) Bossier City, Louisiana
- Party: Republican Party (since 2007)
- Other political affiliations: Democratic Party (until 2007)
- Education: Airline High School
- Alma mater: Louisiana Technical University
- Profession: Politician

Robert Roy Adley (born September 3, 1947) is an American politician. He has served in the Louisiana State Senate and the Louisiana House of Representatives.

Adley was a candidate in the 1995 Louisiana gubernatorial election. After the 2007 Louisiana elections he joined the Republican Party of Louisiana to align with the newly-elected governor Bobby Jindal.
