= Louisiana's 38th State Senate district =

American legislative district

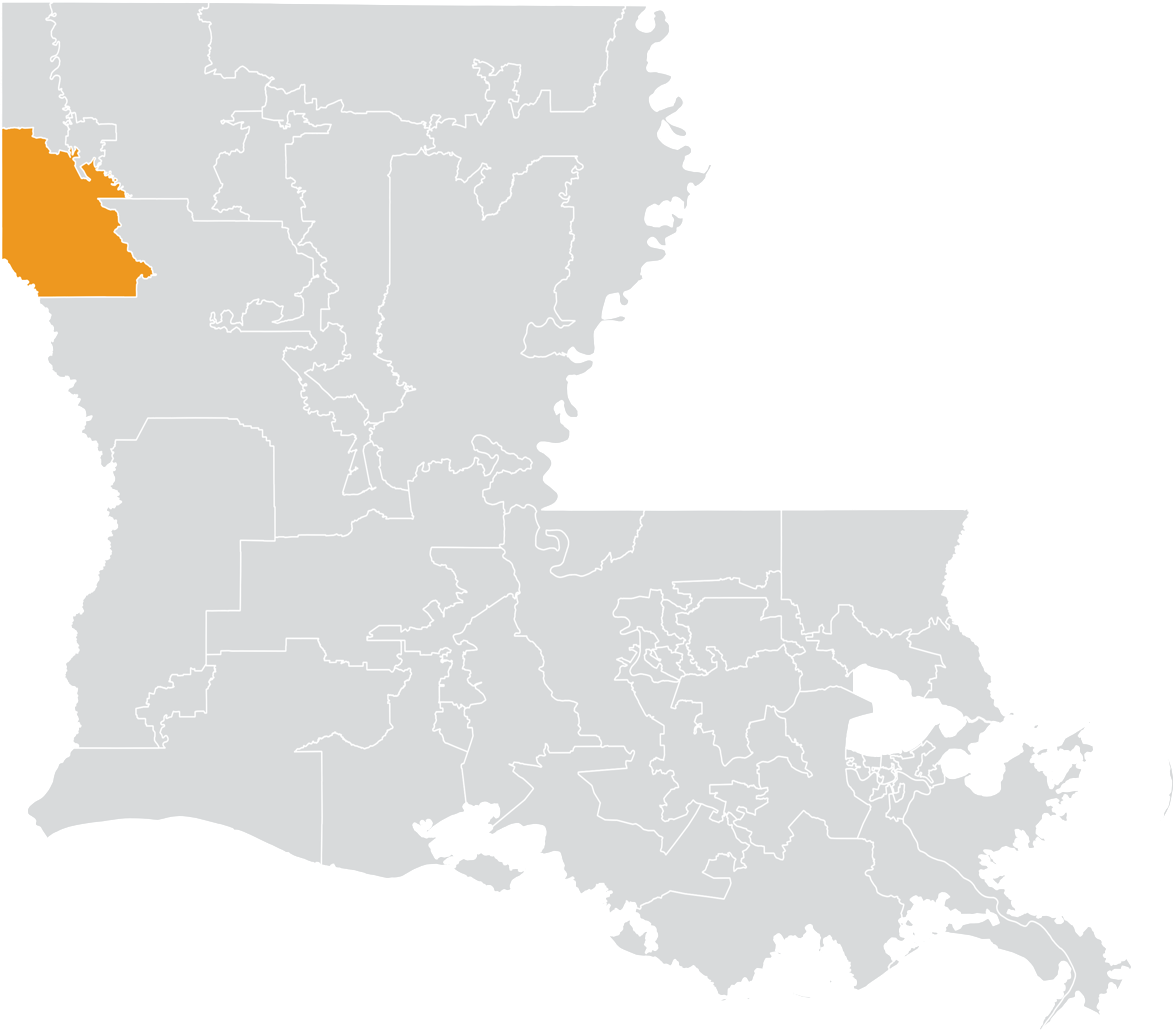
Senator
Barry Milligan; R–Shreveport
- Registration: 42.9% Democratic; 33.8% Republican; 23.3% No party preference
- Demographics: 54% White; 39% Black; 3% Hispanic; 1% Asian; 2% Other
- Population (2019): 114,597
- Registered voters: 73,793

Louisiana's 38th State Senate district is one of 39 districts in the Louisiana State Senate. It has been represented by Republican Barry Milligan since 2020, following Milligan's 2019 defeat of Democratic incumbent John Milkovich.

== Geography ==
District 38 covers all of DeSoto Parish and southern parts of Caddo Parish in Ark-La-Tex, including the towns of Greenwood, Keithville, Stonewall, and Mansfield, as well as a small portion of southern Shreveport.

The district is located entirely within Louisiana's 4th congressional district, and overlaps with the 1st, 3rd, 4th, 5th, 6th, 7th, and 23rd districts of the Louisiana House of Representatives.

== Recent election results ==
Louisiana uses a jungle primary system. If no candidate receives 50% in the first round of voting, when all candidates appear on the same ballot regardless of party, the top-two finishers advance to a runoff election.

=== 2019 ===
2019 Louisiana State Senate election, District 38
Party	Candidate	Votes	%
Republican	Barry Milligan	16,266	50.7
Democratic	John Milkovich (incumbent)	8,447	26.3
Democratic	Katrina Early	7,359	22.9
Total votes		32,072	100
Republican gain from Democratic			

=== 2015 ===
2015 Louisiana State Senate election, District 38
Primary election
Party	Candidate	Votes	%
Republican	Richard Burford	9,566	35.2
Democratic	John Milkovich	9,061	33.3
Republican	Cloyce Clark	5,885	21.6
Democratic	Jemayel Warren	2,693	9.9
Total votes		27,205	100
General election
Democratic	John Milkovich	15,665	52.4
Republican	Richard Burford	14,206	47.6
Total votes		29,871	100
Democratic gain from Republican			

=== 2011 ===
2011 Louisiana State Senate election, District 38
Party	Candidate	Votes	%
Republican	Sherri Smith Buffington (incumbent)	10,570	57.2
Republican	Troy Terrell	7,912	42.8
Total votes		18,482	100
Republican hold			

=== Federal and statewide results ===
Year	Office	Results
2020	President	Trump 56.4–42.3%
2019	Governor (runoff)	Rispone 50.9–49.1%
2016	President	Trump 57.2–40.1%
2015	Governor (runoff)	Edwards 53.3–46.7%
2014	Senate (runoff)	Cassidy 55.7–44.3%
2012	President	Romney 58.7–40.2%
