= John Milkovich =

American politician and attorney

Member of the Louisiana Senate from the 38th district
- In office January 11, 2016 – January 13, 2020
- Preceded by: Sherri Smith Buffington
- Succeeded by: Barry Milligan

Personal details
- Born: Roundup, Montana, U.S.
- Party: Democratic
- Spouse: Carola
- Children: 1
- Education: University of Montana (BS); Paul M. Hebert Law Center (JD)
- Website: Campaign website

John Milkovich is an American politician and attorney from the state of Louisiana. A Democrat, Milkovich represented the 38th district of the Louisiana State Senate, based in southern Shreveport, from 2016 until 2020.

== Career ==
Milkovich was born and raised in Roundup, Montana, and went to the University of Montana. After obtaining his J.D. at the Paul M. Hebert Law Center, Milkovich worked as a judicial clerk for Fred C. Sexton Jr. of the Second Circuit Court of Appeals. Milkovich has also been an attorney at law since 1985.

== Political history ==
Milkovich ran for Louisiana's 4th congressional district in 2002, losing in a landslide to Republican incumbent Jim McCrery.

In 2015, Milkovich announced he would run for the 38th district of the Louisiana State Senate, vacated by term-limited Republican Sherri Smith Buffington. After failing to win a majority in the first round, Milkovich defeated state representative Richie Burford in the runoff with 52% of the vote.

Milkovich was defeated in his bid for a second term in 2019 by Republican Barry Milligan, who won a majority in the first round.

== Comments on vaccines ==
On April 29, 2019, during a vote on Senator Regina Barrow's legislation to expand a state immunization database, Milkovich caused controversy by repeating unscientific and debunked claims about vaccinations and autism. Among other things, Milkovich claimed that "tissue from aborted babies is now used in vaccines" and that "autism did not exist" when he and another senator were growing up, both of which have been repeatedly proven false. Although no lawmaker responded to Milkovich on the Senate floor, U.S. Senator Bill Cassidy, a medical doctor, later called Milkovich's comments "fake news."

== Comments on 2020 Presidential Election ==
John Milkovich has repeatedly denied the results of the 2020 Presidential Election. Milkovich has echoed the disproven claims made by Presidential Trump that he won the election, despite nearly every judicial body that heard the claims ruling that there was not election determinative fraud.
