= Jane H. Smith =

American educator and politician (born 1948)

Jane Holland Smith

Louisiana State Representative for District 8 (Bossier Parish)
- In office 2000–2012
- Preceded by: Robert E. "Bob" Barton
- Succeeded by: Jeff R. Thompson

Louisiana House Minority Leader
- In office 2008–2012
- Succeeded by: John Bel Edwards

Personal details
- Born: January 21, 1948 (age 78) Sabine Parish, Louisiana, U.S.
- Party: Republican
- Spouse: Wendell Scott Smith
- Children: 1
- Education: Northwestern State University
- Occupation: Educator; former Bossier Parish school superintendent

Jane Holland Smith (born January 21, 1948) is an American politician who was a Republican member of the Louisiana House of Representatives, representing Bossier Parish.

In 2012, Governor Bobby Jindal appointed Smith deputy secretary of the Louisiana Revenue Department.

== Biography ==
Born in Sabine Parish, Smith received a B.S. and an M.Ed. from Northwestern State University in Natchitoches, Louisiana. In the 1980s and 1990s, she was an educator. In 1999, she became the first woman elected as to the state legislature from Bossier Parish, to a seat vacated by Republican Robert E. "Bob" Barton (born 1948) of Bossier City, who declined to run again in favor of seeking higher office.

Louisiana House of Representatives
Preceded by Robert E. "Bob" Barton	Louisiana State Representative for District 8 (Bossier Parish); Jane Holland Smith; 2000–2012	Succeeded by Jeff R. Thompson
