= Bossier City, Louisiana =

Bossier City
- City
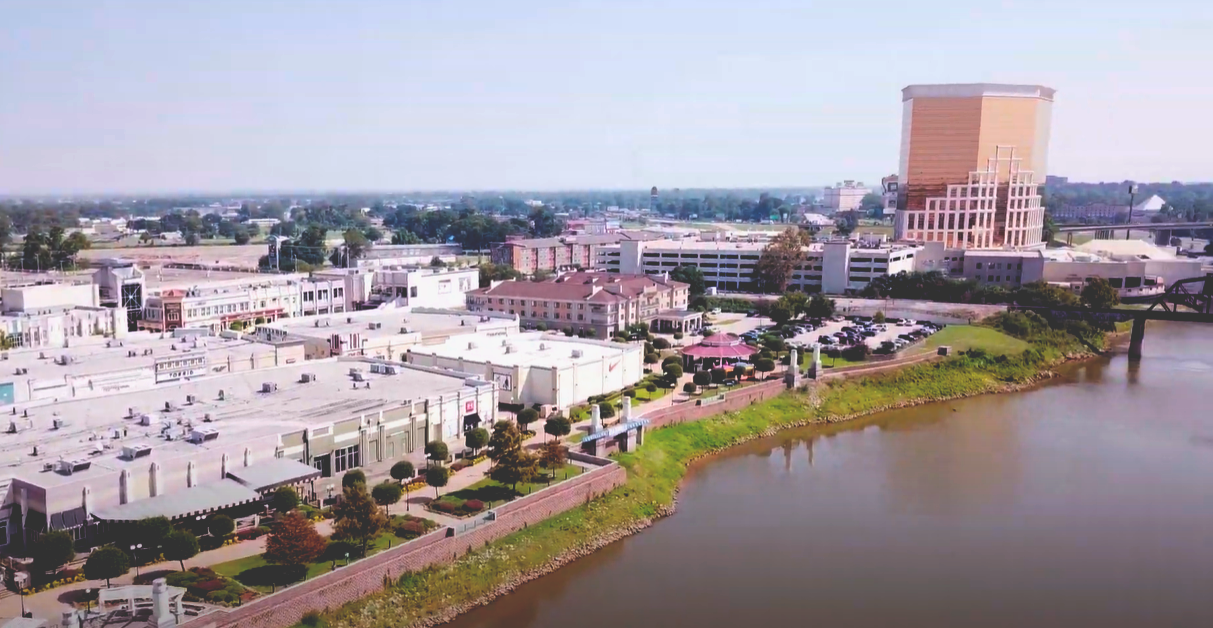
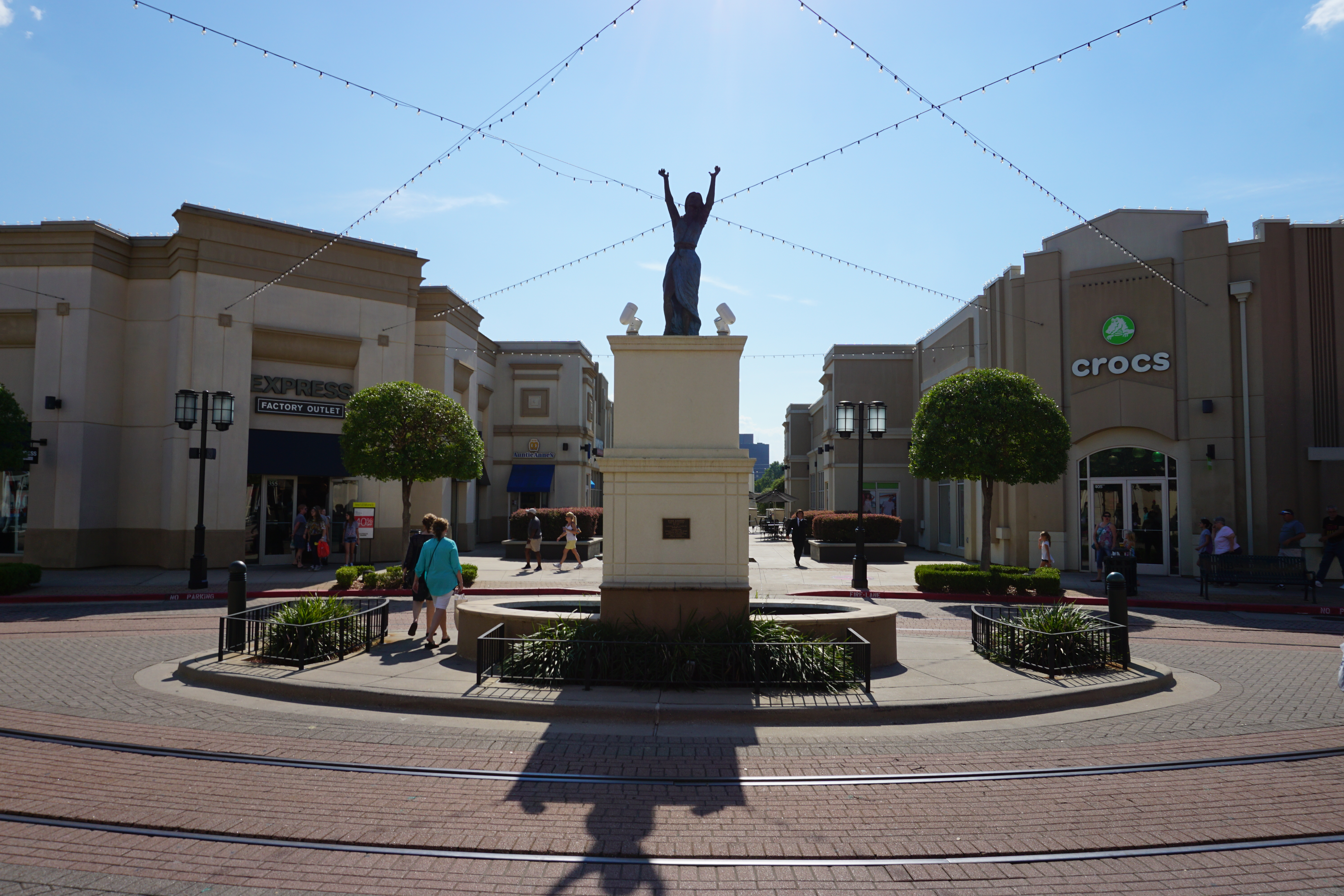
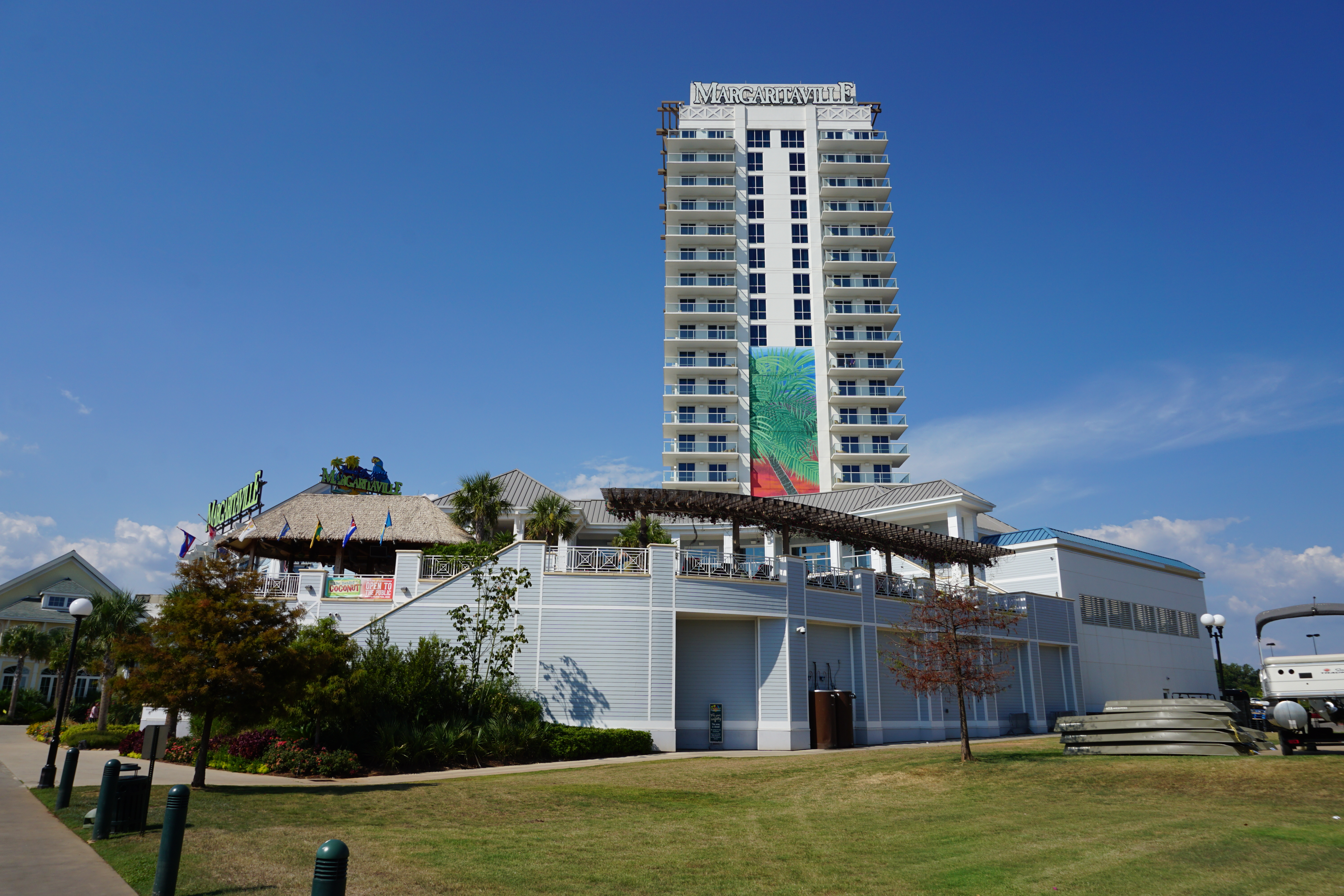
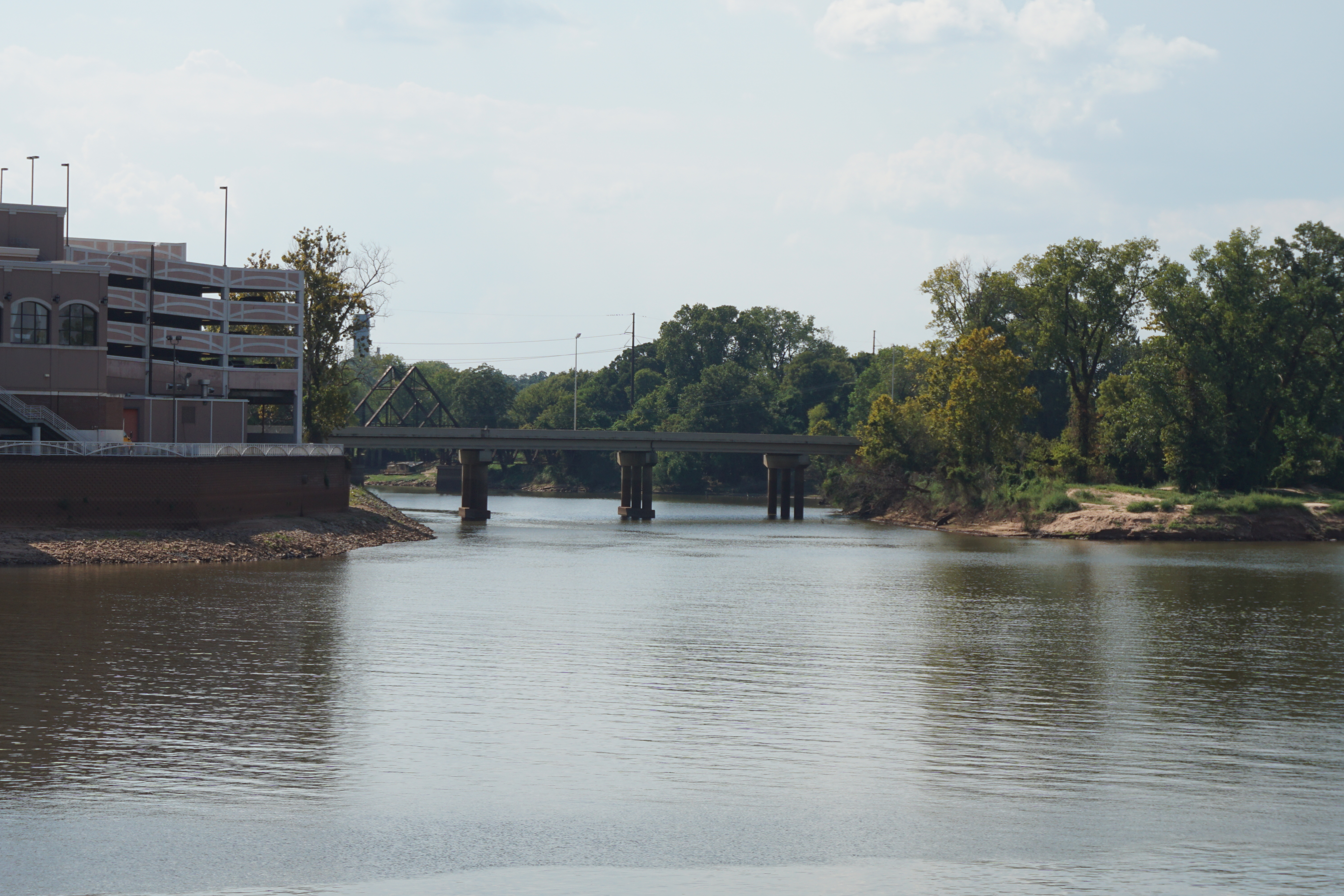
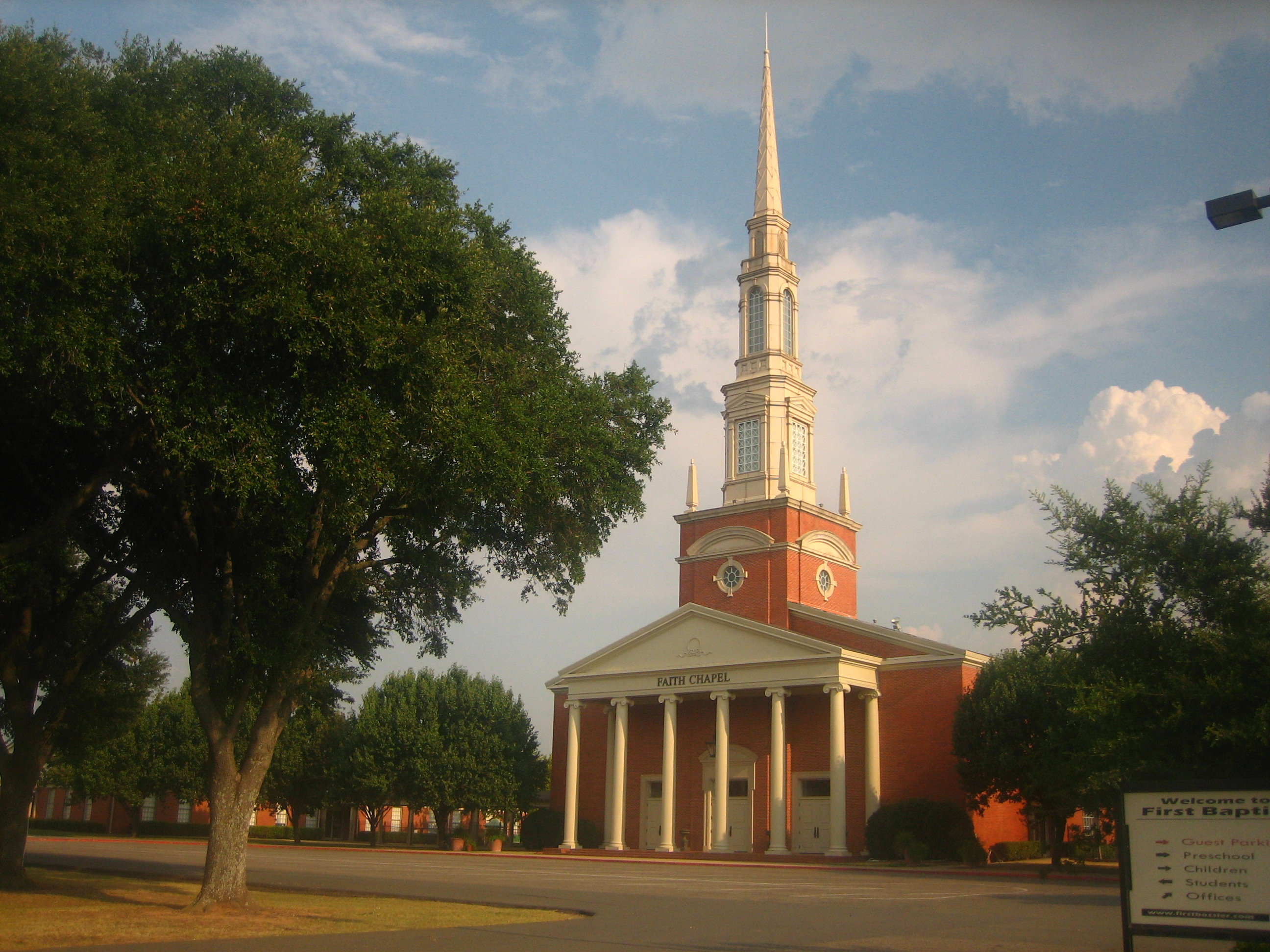
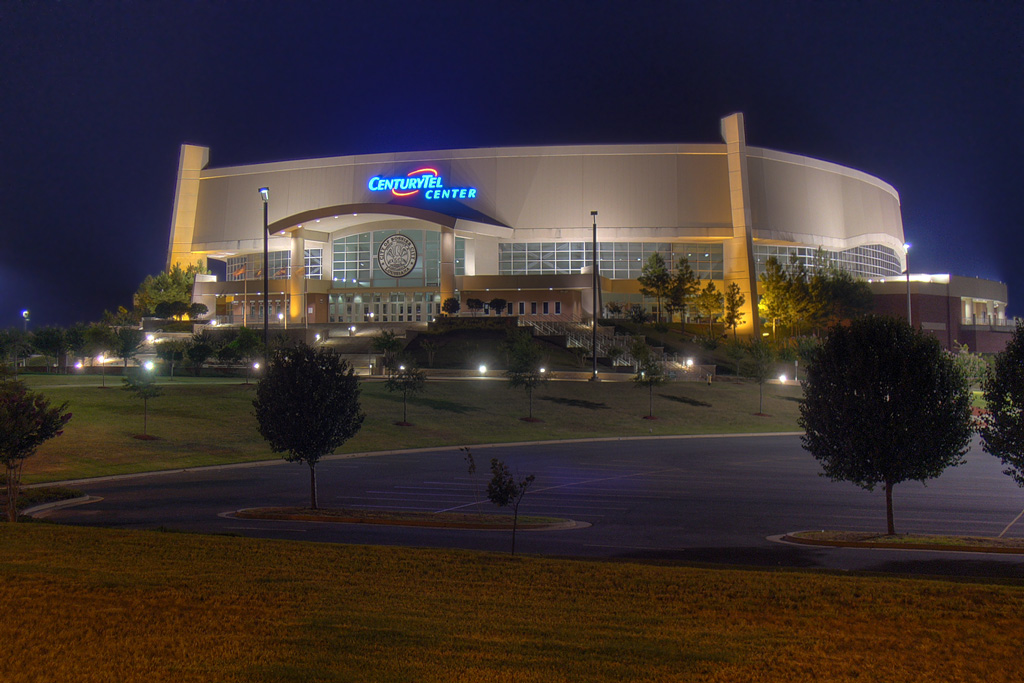
- Downtown Louisiana Boardwalk Magaritaville Casino Twelve Mile Bayou First Baptist Church Brookshire Grocery Arena

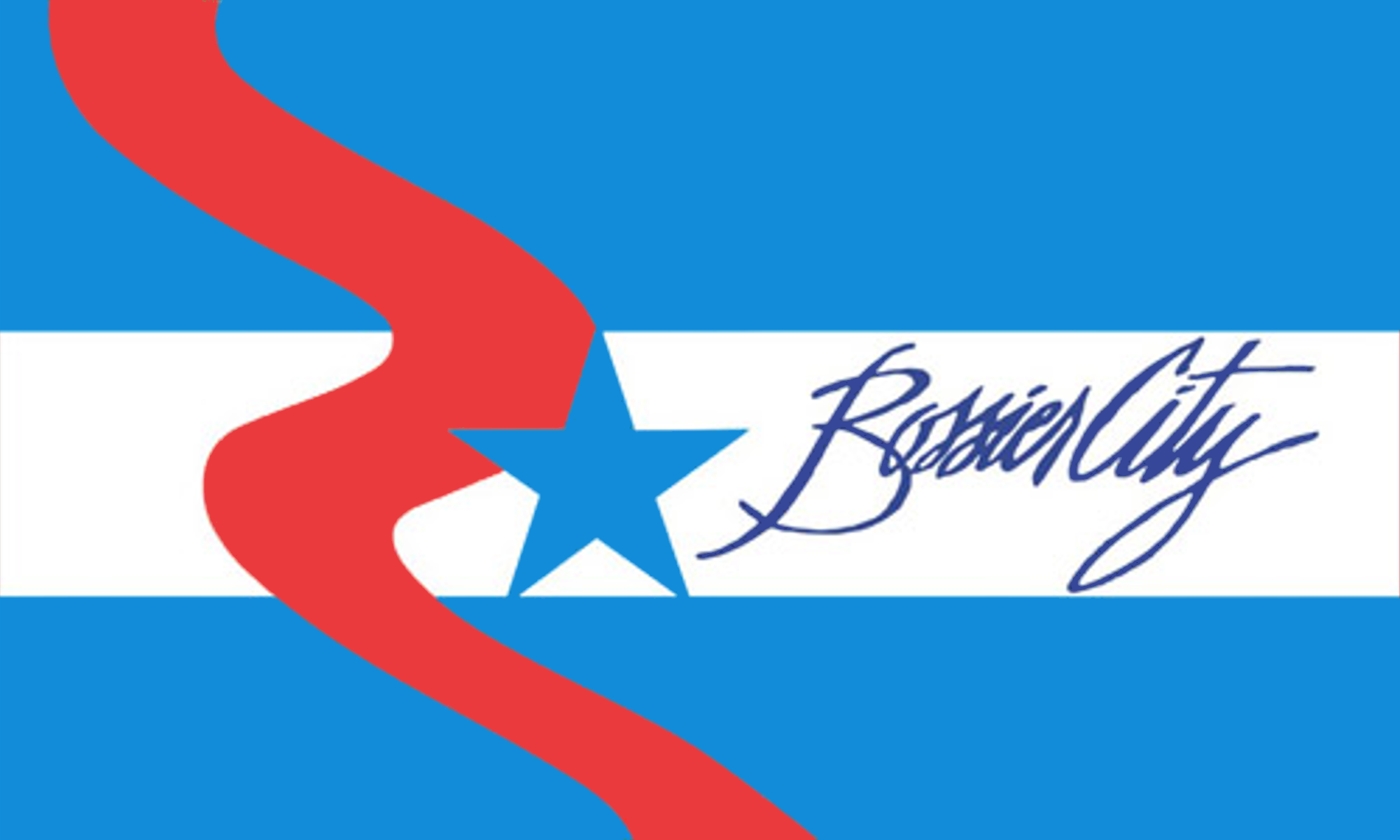
- Flag
- Motto: "Union, Justice, Confidence"
- Location in Bossier Parish, Louisiana

- Location in Louisiana Location in the United States
- Coordinates: 32°31′04″N 93°41′29″W
- Country: United States
- State: Louisiana
- Parishes: Bossier
- Founded: 1907 (119 years ago)
- Named after: Pierre Bossier

Government
  - Mayor: Tommy Chandler (R)
  - City council: Members list: At Large: Craton Cochran (R); At Large: Chris Smith (R); Dist 1: Brian Hammons (R); Dist 2: Debra W. Ross (D); Dist 3: Cliff Smith (R); Dist 4: Joel Girouard (R); Dist 5: Vince Maggio (R)

Area
  - City: 45.02 sq mi (116.60 km^{2})
  - Land: 43.85 sq mi (113.57 km^{2})
  - Water: 1.17 sq mi (3.03 km^{2}) 1.89%
  - Metro: 2,698.0 sq mi (6,987.8 km^{2})
- Elevation: 164 ft (50 m)

Population (2020)
  - City: 62,701
  - Estimate (2025): 63,949 ▲
  - Rank: BO: 1st LA: 7th
  - Density: 1,429.9/sq mi (552.08/km^{2})
  - Metro: 393,406 (US: 140th)
- Time zone: UTC−6 (CST)
  - Summer (DST): UTC−5 (CDT)
- ZIP codes: 71111-71113, 71171-71172
- Area code: 318
- FIPS code: 22-08920
- GNIS feature ID: 2403899
- Primary airport: Shreveport Regional Airport
- Website: www.bossiercity.org

Bossier City (/ˈboʊʒər/ BOH-zhər) is a city in Bossier Parish, Louisiana, United States. The population was 62,701 at the 2020 census. Located on the eastern bank of the Red River, Bossier City is closely tied economically and socially to its sister city, Shreveport, on the western bank. It is the second-most populous city in the Shreveport–Bossier City metropolitan area. The parish operates its own community college, Bossier Parish Community College.

== History ==
=== 19th century ===
In the 1830s, the area of Bossier City was the plantation Elysian Grove, which was purchased by James Cane and his second wife Mary Doal Cilley Bennett Cane.

Cane had come to the area with his first wife Rebecca Bennett, and her brother, William Bennett, and his wife Mary Doal (née Cille)y Bennett. They ran a trading post across the river on what was then Caddo Indian territory, a portion called "Bennett's Bluff". The trading post partners became a one-seventh partner in the new Shreve Town, which eventually developed as Shreveport.

Like most plantations, Elysian Grove had frontage on the Red River for access to transportation for shipping cotton and other commodities. The Texas Trail crossed the Red River at this point. The trading post on the west side operated a ferry between what would become Shreveport and Bossier City. The plantation loading and unloading dock was later recorded as "Cane's Landing" in the old ferry log books. For a very short time, Cane's Landing was known as Cane City.

The Canes and Bennetts were among the earliest European-American settlers in the area. Mary D. C. Bennett gave birth to the first white baby of the area, William Smith Bennett Jr. He died at an early age.

In 1843, a section of land east of the Red River was divided from the Great Natchitoches District and Claiborne Parish areas and was called Bossier Parish. It was named in honor of Pierre Evariste John Baptiste Bossier, a former Creole general, who became a cotton planter in Bossier Parish. Of ethnic French descent, he was one of the first European settlers in the area after most of the Native Americans had been forcibly removed by the federal government.

In the 1840s, the Great Western Migration of Americans and immigrants from the East and Upper South began. The parish grew in population. Many early settlers passed through the region on their way to the Western U.S. By 1850, more than 200 wagons a week passed through Bossier City, with many travelers from the Upper South intending to settle in Texas. Some of these settlers stayed in Louisiana, attracted by the fertile soil and river valley. In 1850, the U.S. census listed the population of Bossier City (?) at 6,962.

=== American Civil War ===
During the American Civil War, companies of Confederate soldiers shipped out of Cane's Landing aboard steamboats for distant battlefields. Mrs. Cane hosted hundreds of Confederate officers and troops who were heading off to war. Mrs. Cane's plantation was fortified to protect Shreveport by three batteries, with Fort Kirby Smith in the center. The others were Batteries Price, and Walker and Ewell.

Fort Smith protected the area from an eastern invasion. The American Civil War reached Bossier Parish in 1861, and ended in Shreveport four years later, when the Trans-Mississippi Department surrendered. In the 20th century, Bossier High School was constructed near the former site of the fort.

=== Shed Road ===
Shed Road, the first all-weather turnpike in the American South, was constructed in the 1870s and operated from 1874 to 1886. It extended for 9 miles (14 km) from Red Chute to the Red River. The elevated and covered roadway led to a plantation that was accessible by a ferry. The covered road made the transportation of goods easier before the arrival of the railroads.

=== Classification as a city ===
Anna B., granddaughter of James and Mary Cane, felt the area would prosper and began promoting the idea of a riverfront city. Anna B. and J. J. Stockwell sold lots in 1883. The area grew quickly, as did transportation through it. At the time, the unincorporated settlement was often called Cane City.

Around 1907, Cane City was incorporated by Louisiana Governor Newton C. Blanchard; the village was renamed as Bossier City. Blanchard appointed Ewald Max Hoyer, a Shreveport businessman, as the first Bossier City mayor. By that time, Bossier City had grown from an area around a square mile to a city containing more than 35 sq mi (91 km^{2}). Continued growth led to Bossier City's being reclassified from village to town by Governor John M. Parker. Later, Governor Earl Kemp Long issued a proclamation classifying Bossier City as a city.

The "golden spike" commemorated the completion of the east–west Vicksburg, Shreveport and Pacific Railroad. It was driven at Bossier City on July 12, 1884, by Julia "Pansy" Rule. It was the first such spike to be driven by a woman. The north–south Shreveport and Arkansas Railroad was completed on April 6, 1888. The Louisiana–Arkansas Railroad was completed on November 2, 1909. The Dixie Overland Highway from the East to the West Coast was built in 1918. These railroads and highways combined to make Bossier City a hub for future activity.

The discovery of crude oil, to the south, in 1908, thrust Bossier City into the nationwide oil boom. Bossier's central location to the rural oil fields made it a major player in the oil patch. Several international oil companies were located in the area. The advantages brought by black gold fueled many civic, social and economic improvements.

A fire on June 23, 1925, consumed one-half of downtown Bossier City. Local citizens were unable to battle the blaze. The loss spurred civic improvements, including a modern water system capable of fighting such fires, a new city hall, a modern fire alarm system, modern sidewalks, and the first city park.

In the 1930s, construction began on Barksdale Airfield (now Barksdale Air Force Base). In 1929 the land on which the base is built was unincorporated property south of Bossier City. The city of Shreveport annexed the land and donated it to the federal government. Through the years, Bossier City expanded, eventually encompassing the area surrounding the base. The first unit assigned to Barksdale was the 20th Pursuit Group. Before World War II, Barksdale was a training school for the Army Air Corps.

During World War II, Barksdale trained pilots, navigators, and bombardiers. Later, the base became one of the key bases of the Strategic Air Command in the new Air Force. Today Barksdale is the headquarters for the 8th Air Force.

In the 1890s, Cane City had a population of about 600. Bossier City in 2012 had an estimated population of over 64,000. First a cotton-exporting river landing, next a railroad town, then an airbase and oil-boom town, Bossier City has become known for its tourism and casino gambling.

Three casinos in the city have financed a number of municipal projects, many completed during the administration of the late Mayor George Dement. Recent improvements include the CenturyLink Center, Louisiana Boardwalk, Benton Road Overpass, and the Arthur Ray Teague Parkway, located along the eastern side of the Red River. Dement also procured Amtrak service between Bossier City and Dallas, Texas.

In 2005, Dement was succeeded as mayor by Lo Walker, his former administrative assistant and mayoral opponent from 1989, the first Republican politician to hold the city's top executive position.

=== Growth and redevelopment ===
On April 20, 2017, in their joint "State of Bossier" address, hosted by the Bossier Chamber of Commerce, Mayor Lo Walker, and Bossier Parish Police Jury President Bob Brotherton described the growth of the city and parish as "outstanding." With a population of 69,000 in a 2015 study by Louisiana State University, Bossier City had become the sixth-largest city in the state and the fastest-growing one.

Walker said that the city and the parish "work extremely close together, and our business and civic leaders and military make us an outstanding parish." The parish grew at 19%; the city grew at 10%. According to the Bossier Economic Development Foundation, the city could have reached 80,000 by 2019. Ongoing projects contributing to growth include the Walter O. Bigby Carriageway (the north parkway extension named for former state representative and judge Walter O. Bigby), Shed Road construction, and the South Bossier redevelopment districts.

== Geography ==
The city lies primarily on the banks of the Red River, and has a largely flat topography in contrast with Shreveport's terrain. The northern city limits are noticeably more hilly than the rest of the city. Many small waterways flow through the city, such as Flat River and Red Chute Bayou, which provide drainage for many areas of the city.

The city has a total area of 43.90 square miles (113.69 km^{2}), of which 0.99 square miles (2.56 km^{2}) are covered by water.

=== Climate ===
Bossier shares most aspects of its climate with its sister city of Shreveport. The city has a humid subtropical climate (Köppen climate classification Cfa) with hot, humid summers and mild winters.

During the warmer months, the city is prone to severe thunderstorms that feature heavy rain, high winds, hail, and occasional tornadoes. The city has a slightly above-average rate of tornadoes when compared to the U.S. average. Due to the flat topography of the city and the prominence of smaller waterways that are prone to backwater flooding from the Red River, the city occasionally experiences severe flooding events. A notable occurrence of severe flooding occurred in March 2016 after torrential rains caused a rapid rise of many local waterways, displacing upwards of 3,500 people from their homes across the area. Freezes and ice storms regularly occur during the winters.

Climate data for Bossier City, Louisiana (Shreveport Regional Airport), 1981–2010 normals, extremes 1871–present
Month	Jan	Feb	Mar	Apr	May	Jun	Jul	Aug	Sep	Oct	Nov	Dec	Year
Record high °F (°C)	85 (29)	89 (32)	92 (33)	96 (36)	102 (39)	104 (40)	108 (42)	110 (43)	109 (43)	99 (37)	88 (31)	84 (29)	110 (43)
Mean maximum °F (°C)	76.1 (24.5)	79.4 (26.3)	84.4 (29.1)	87.5 (30.8)	92.2 (33.4)	95.5 (35.3)	99.4 (37.4)	100.9 (38.3)	97.2 (36.2)	91.1 (32.8)	82.6 (28.1)	76.6 (24.8)	101.8 (38.8)
Mean daily maximum °F (°C)	57.3 (14.1)	61.5 (16.4)	69.5 (20.8)	76.9 (24.9)	83.8 (28.8)	90.1 (32.3)	93.4 (34.1)	94.1 (34.5)	88.2 (31.2)	78.2 (25.7)	67.5 (19.7)	58.5 (14.7)	76.6 (24.8)
Mean daily minimum °F (°C)	36.2 (2.3)	39.7 (4.3)	46.3 (7.9)	53.6 (12.0)	62.7 (17.1)	69.5 (20.8)	72.7 (22.6)	72.1 (22.3)	65.6 (18.7)	54.6 (12.6)	45.2 (7.3)	37.7 (3.2)	54.7 (12.6)
Mean minimum °F (°C)	20.3 (−6.5)	24.6 (−4.1)	29.6 (−1.3)	37.4 (3.0)	49.3 (9.6)	60.7 (15.9)	67.2 (19.6)	64.8 (18.2)	51.3 (10.7)	38.3 (3.5)	29.1 (−1.6)	21.7 (−5.7)	17.3 (−8.2)
Record low °F (°C)	−2 (−19)	−5 (−21)	15 (−9)	31 (−1)	39 (4)	52 (11)	58 (14)	53 (12)	42 (6)	28 (−2)	16 (−9)	5 (−15)	−5 (−21)
Average precipitation inches (mm)	4.20 (107)	4.75 (121)	4.14 (105)	4.19 (106)	4.93 (125)	5.40 (137)	3.65 (93)	2.73 (69)	3.16 (80)	4.96 (126)	4.53 (115)	4.77 (121)	51.41 (1,305)
Average snowfall inches (cm)	0.6 (1.5)	0.5 (1.3)	—	0 (0)	0 (0)	0 (0)	0 (0)	0 (0)	0 (0)	0 (0)	0 (0)	0.3 (0.76)	1.4 (3.6)
Average precipitation days (≥ 0.01 in)	9.0	9.1	9.2	7.6	9.5	9.2	8.1	6.4	6.9	8.0	8.7	9.6	101.2
Average snowy days (≥ 0.1 in)	0.3	0.3	0.1	0	0	0	0	0	0	0	0	0.1	0.8
Average relative humidity (%)	72.6	69.7	67.7	69.6	73.2	73.3	72.4	71.7	73.6	71.7	73.7	74.4	72.0
Mean monthly sunshine hours	158.3	172.8	213.1	231.2	267.1	297.9	317.9	300.7	249.8	235.8	176.8	158.4	2,779.8
Percentage possible sunshine	50	56	57	59	62	70	73	73	67	67	56	51	63
Source: NOAA (sun and relative humidity 1961–1990)

== Demographics ==
Historical population
Census	Pop.	Note	%±
1890	202		—
1910	775		—
1920	1,094		41.2%
1930	4,003		265.9%
1940	5,786		44.5%
1950	15,470		167.4%
1960	32,776		111.9%
1970	43,769		33.5%
1980	50,817		16.1%
1990	52,721		3.7%
2000	56,461		7.1%
2010	61,315		8.6%
2020	62,701		2.3%
2025 (est.)	63,259	▲	0.9%
U.S. Decennial Census; 2018 Estimate

=== Racial and ethnic composition ===
Bossier City city, Louisiana – Racial and ethnic composition Note: the US Census treats Hispanic/Latino as an ethnic category. This table excludes Latinos from the racial categories and assigns them to a separate category. Hispanics/Latinos may be of any race.
Race / Ethnicity (NH = Non-Hispanic)	Pop 2000	Pop 2010	Pop 2020	% 2000	% 2010	% 2020
White alone (NH)	39,177	37,838	31,843	69.39%	61.71%	50.79%
Black or African American alone (NH)	12,759	15,545	19,092	22.60%	25.35%	30.45%
Native American or Alaska Native alone (NH)	268	253	240	0.47%	0.41%	0.38%
Asian alone (NH)	967	1,205	1,482	1.71%	1.97%	2.36%
Native Hawaiian or Pacific Islander alone (NH)	59	116	76	0.10%	0.19%	0.12%
Other race alone (NH)	73	81	247	0.13%	0.13%	0.39%
Mixed race or Multiracial (NH)	926	1,322	3,026	1.64%	2.16%	4.83%
Hispanic or Latino (any race)	2,232	4,955	6,695	3.95%	8.08%	10.68%
Total	56,461	61,315	62,701	100.00%	100.00%	100.00%

=== 2020 census ===
Per the 2020 United States census, 62,701 people, 26,677 households, and 17,524 families resided in the city. According to 2019 census estimates per the American Community Survey, 24.2% of the population were 18 and older, and 13.8% were 65 and older; the 26,927 households from 2015 to 2019 had an average of 2.44 people per household. In 1890, Bossier City initially had a population of 202, which has steadily increased since.

In 2019, the racial and ethnic makeup of the city was 58.5% non-Hispanic or Latino white, 27.9% Black or African American, 0.4% Native American, 2.4% Asian, 0.1% Native Hawaiian and other Pacific Islander, 2.5% two or more races, and 8.6% Hispanic and Latino American of any race. At the 2020 census, the racial and ethnic makeup of the city was 50.79% non-Hispanic white, 30.45% Black or African American, 0.38% Native American, 2.36% Asian, 0.12% Pacific Islander, 5.22% two or more races, and 10.68% Hispanic and Latino American of any race; the 2020 census reflected nationwide trends of greater diversification and the growth of traditional minority populations in areas once predominantly non-Hispanic white.

Of the 26,927 households estimated at 2019's American Community Survey, the owner-occupied housing rate was 52.8% and the median value of an owner-occupied housing unit was $163,500. The median cost with a mortgage was $1,182 versus $363 without a mortgage, and the median gross rent was $955. The median income for a household in the city was $50,340, and the per capita income was $26,755; an estimated 19.7% of the population lived at or below the poverty line. By 2020, its median household income was $48,385 with a mean income of $63,114.

=== Religion ===
The majority of Bossier City's population is Christian. Neighboring Shreveport is more religiously diverse than Bossier. Of its population, 37.9% identified as Baptists, primarily affiliated with the Southern Baptist Convention and National Baptist Convention, USA, Inc. Within the city, 6.7% were Methodists, primarily served by the United Methodist Church, 5.2% were Catholics in the Shreveport Diocese, 2.2% Pentecostals, 0.9% Latter Day Saints, 0.4% Presbyterian, 0.4% Lutheran, and 0.2% Episcopalian or Anglican. Within the Christian population of Bossier City, 7.7% claimed to be from another Christian group. Outside of Christendom, 0.3% of the city's residents were adherents to Islam. Less than 0.1% of Bossier's residents identified with Judaism, or eastern religions such as Hinduism or Buddhism.

== Education ==
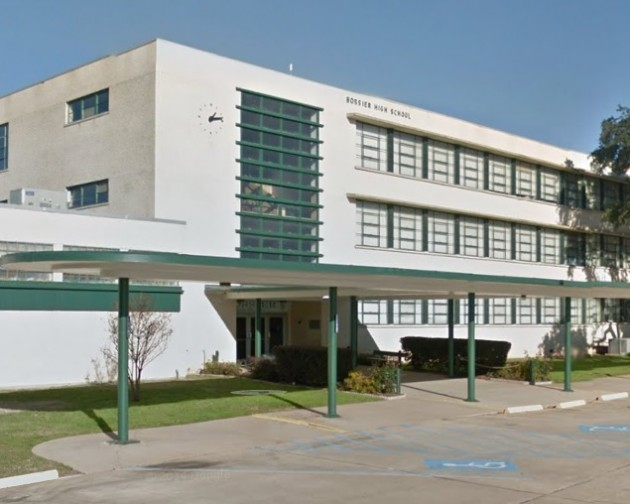
Bossier High School

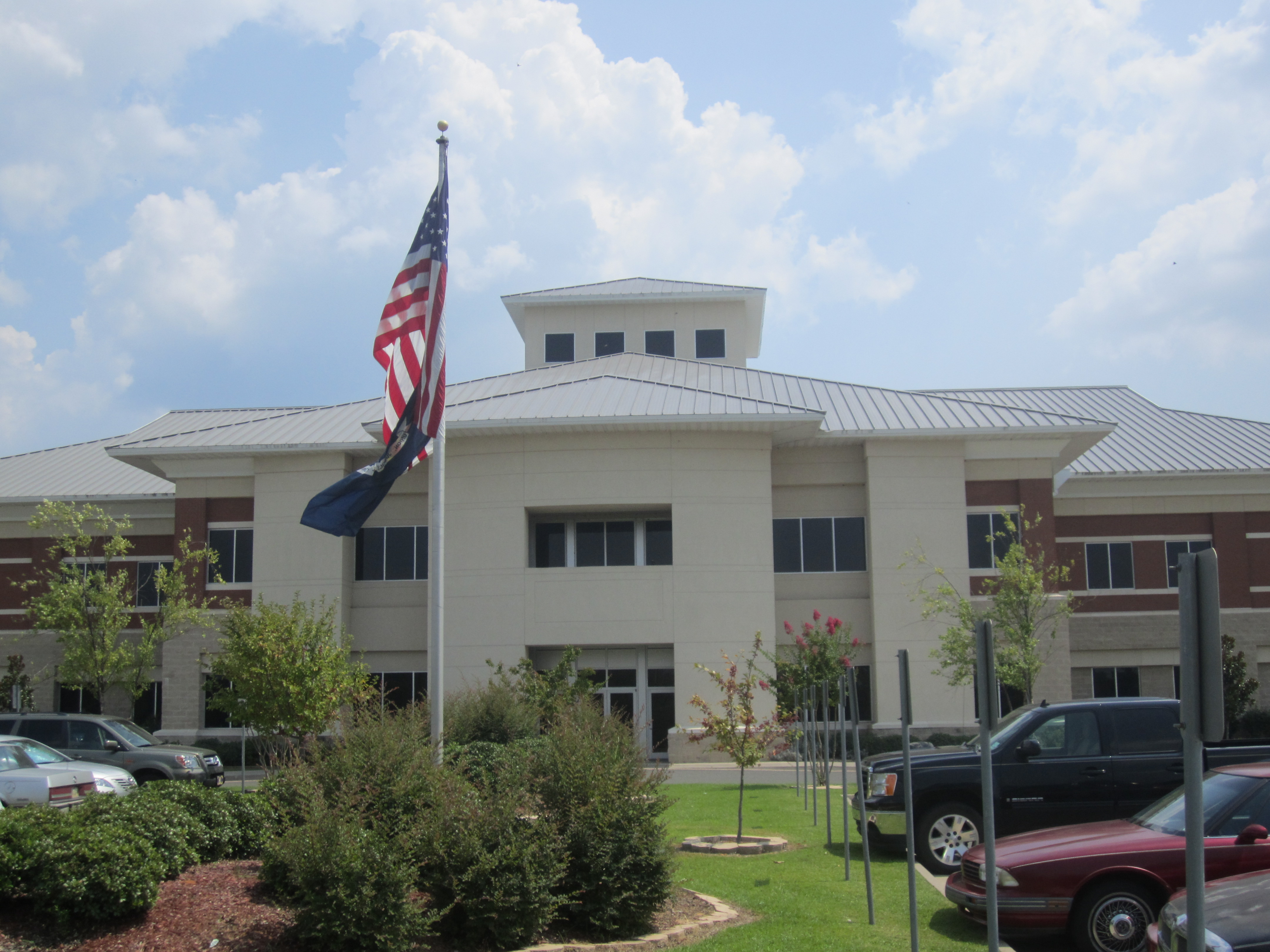
Bossier Parish Community College

=== Primary and secondary schools ===
Bossier City residents are zoned to Bossier Parish Schools, as are all residents of the parish.

Elementary schools in Bossier City:

- Apollo Elementary School
- Bellaire Elementary School
- Bossier Elementary School
- Central Park Elementary School
- Curtis Elementary School
- R.V. Kerr Elementary School
- Meadowview Elementary School
- Plantation Park Elementary School
- Stockwell Place Elementary School
- Sun City Elementary School
- Waller Elementary School

W.T. Lewis Elementary School, outside the city limits, serves dsome portions of Bossier City. A portion of Bossier City is in the collective boundary of T. L. Rhodes Elementary School (Eastwood CDP, PreKindergarten-Grade 1), Platt Elementary School (Eastwood, grades 2-3), and Princeton Elementary School (grades 4-5). Additionally, a small area of the city limits is in the zone for Elm Grove Elementary School, also outside of the city limits.

Middle schools in Bossier City include:

- Cope Middle School
- Elm Grove Middle School
- Greenacres Middle School
- T.O. Rusheon Middle School

Additionally, Haughton Middle School in Haughton has a boundary including a portion of Bossier City.

High schools in Bossier City include:

- Airline High School
- Bossier High School

Parkway High School, just outside the city limits, has a boundary including parts of Bossier City. Additionally, Haughton High School in Haughton has a boundary including a portion of Bossier City.

=== Tertiary education ===
Bossier Parish is in the areas of Bossier Parish Community College and Northwest Louisiana Technical Community College.

Four year institutions:

- Louisiana Tech University at Shreveport-Bossier City

== Media ==
As a sister city to Shreveport, the city of Bossier City is served by the Bossier Press-Tribune and Shreveport Times. In addition, The Forum, City Lights, and SB Magazine are news magazines in the Shreveport–Bossier City area. The city shares the same television and radio markets with Shreveport and the Texarkana metropolitan area as part of the Ark-La-Tex.

In mainstream media, "Bossier City" is a song by David Allan Coe, in which he sings, "And it sure smells like snow in Bossier City..." Johnny Rodriguez recorded a song called "Achin' Bossier City Backyard Blues" in 1972. Turnpike Troubadours 2007 freshman album is entitled Bossier City, and includes the title track "Bossier City".

=== Radio ===
Bossier City is the second most populous and the principal city of the Shreveport radio market.

=== Television ===
Bossier City is the second most populous city in the Shreveport media market for television.

== Sports and entertainment ==
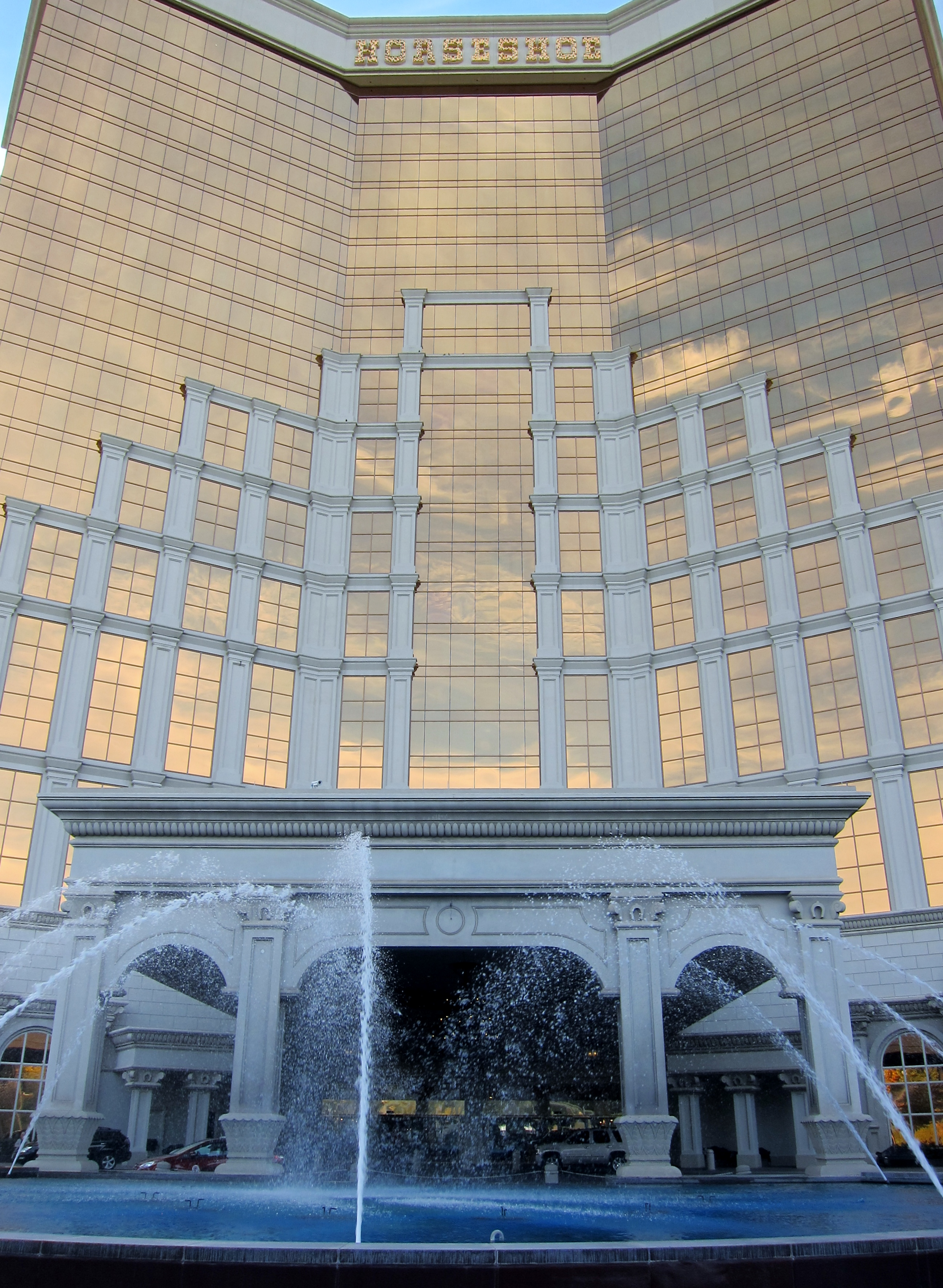
Horseshoe Casino

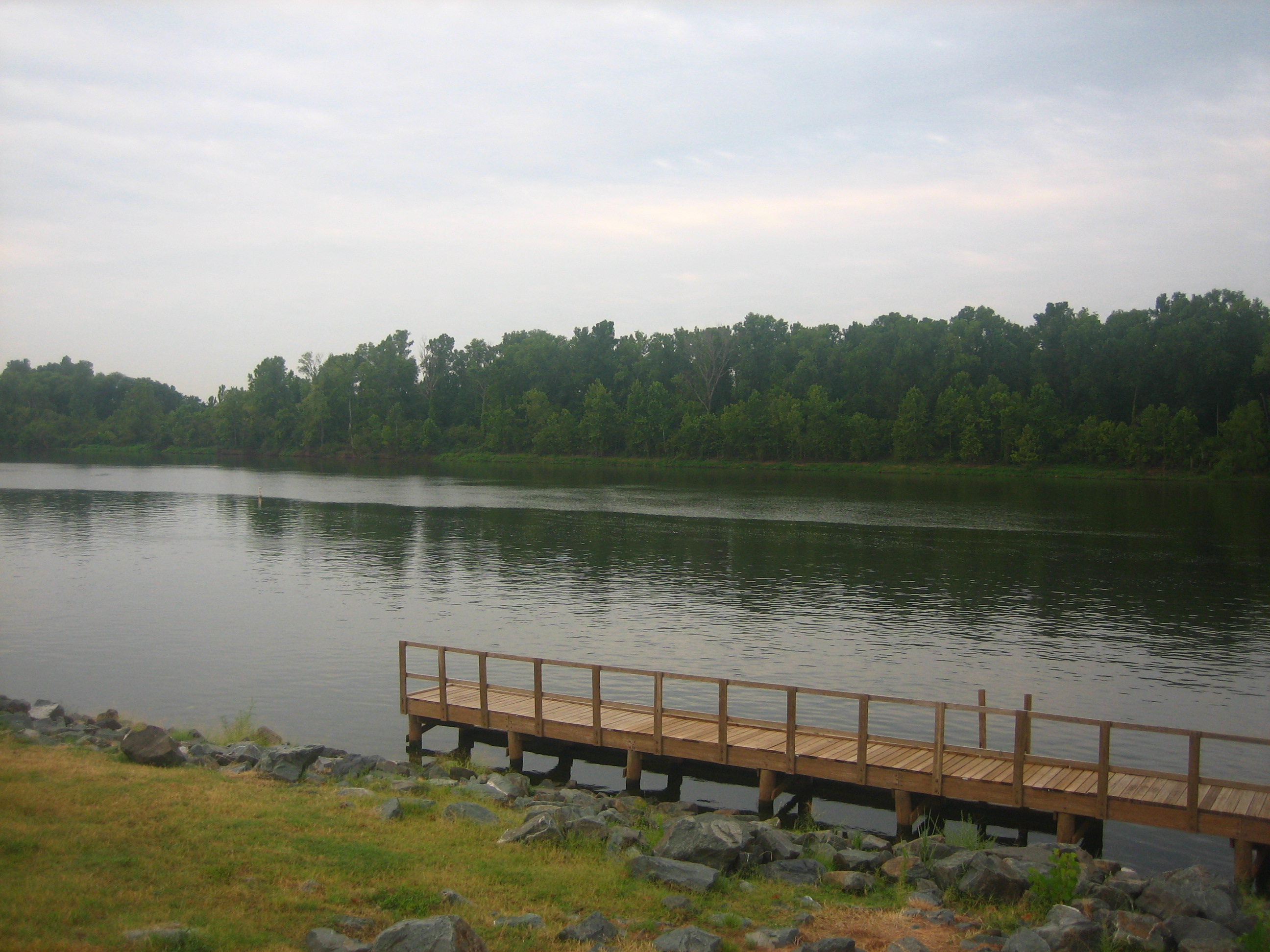
The Red River from the Arthur Teague Parkway in Bossier City

From the 1930s to the 1970s, Bossier was regionally and even nationally known for its entertainment district known as The Bossier Strip, which followed U.S. Highway 80 through the city. Nightclubs proliferated from the Texas Avenue Bridge to the Bossier-Webster parish line. Prior to the 1940s, The Strip was as well known for such entertainment as Las Vegas, Nevada.

Bossier City and Shreveport share an all-women's flat track roller derby team named the Twin City Knockers. The team is the newest competing sport in the area, founded in January 2010. Bouts are hosted at Hot Wheels skating rink in south Bossier.

The Brookshire Grocery Arena (formerly CenturyTel Center) in Bossier City was the home of the Bossier–Shreveport Battle Wings of the AF2, as well as the Bossier-Shreveport Mudbugs of the Central Hockey League. The arena has hosted top performers, including Britney Spears and Aerosmith, as well as rodeos, ice shows, and children's entertainment.

The 2005 Red River Classic PRCA Rodeo to be hosted at the CenturyTel Center was cancelled due to the arena's use as a shelter for Hurricane Katrina evacuees.

The city hosts three riverboat casino gambling resorts along the east bank of the Red River: Margaritaville, Horseshoe, and Boomtown. Diamond Jacks previously operated in the area before closing, but Foundation Gaming has plans for reopening in 2024. Horse racing and gambling on slot machines is also available at Louisiana Downs, which opened in 1974.

== Notable people ==
- Jimmy Boyd, state representative for Bossier Parish from 1944 to 1952
- Henry Newton Brown Jr., judge of the Louisiana Second Circuit Court of Appeals
- Jeff Cox, judge of Division C of the 26th Judicial District
- Raymond Crews, Republican state representative for District 8
- Tim Dement, amateur boxer and former Bossier City police detective
- Ryan Gatti, state senator for District 36, Bossier City lawyer
- Eurlyne Howell, Miss Louisiana USA 1958, Miss USA 1958
- Mike Johnson, Speaker of the United States House of Representatives
- Keith Lehr, two-time World Series of Poker bracelet winner
- Jared Leto, Academy Award-winning actor and musician
- Shannon Leto, drummer of 30 Seconds to Mars
- Judi Ann Mason, Hollywood screenwriter and producer
- John McConathy (1930–2016), professional basketball player
- Mike McConathy (born 1955), basketball coach at Northwestern State University
- Buddy Roemer, former United States Representative and Governor of Louisiana
- Charles E. Roemer II, farmer, businessman, and politician
- B. J. Ryan Baseball player for the Toronto Blue Jays
- Jeffrey D. Sadow, political scientist, columnist, and professor
- Jeff R. Thompson, state representative; successor to Jane Smith
- David Toms, a professional golfer
- Randy Walker, a professional American football player
- Todd Walker, a professional baseball player
- Jesse Winchester, musician and songwriter
