= Terry Landry =

Terry Landry may refer to:

- Terry Landry Sr., member of the Louisiana House of Representatives
- Terry Landry Jr., his son, member of the Louisiana House of Representatives
