= Louisiana's 67th House of Representatives district =

American legislative district

Louisiana's 67th State House of Representatives district
Representative
| Terry Landry Jr. D–Baton Rouge |

Louisiana's 67th House of Representatives district is one of 105 Louisiana House of Representatives districts. It is currently Representative by Democrat Terry Landry Jr.

== Geography ==
HD67 is located entirely inside of the city of Baton Rouge.

== Election results ==
| Year | Winning candidate | Party | Percent | Opponent | Party | Percent | Opponent | Party | Percent |
|---|---|---|---|---|---|---|---|---|---|
| 2011 | Patricia Smith | Democratic | 61.1% | Lorris Burgess | Democratic | 38.9% | | | |
| 2015 | Patricia Smith | Democratic | 100% | | | | | | |
| 2019 | Larry Selders | Democratic | 54.8% | Leah Cullins | Democratic | 45.2% | | | |
| 2023 | Larry Selders | Democratic | 100% | | | | | | |
| 2025 - Special | Terry Landry Jr. | Democratic | 51.8% | Malcom Myer | Democratic | 42.2% | Sonny Marchbanks | Democratic | 6% |
