= Yvonne Dorsey-Colomb =

American politician (born 1952)

Member of the Louisiana State Senate from the 14th district
- In office January 2008 – January 2020
- Preceded by: Cleo Fields
- Succeeded by: Cleo Fields

Member of the Louisiana House of Representatives from the 67th district
- In office April 1993 – January 2008
- Preceded by: John Michael Guidry
- Succeeded by: Patricia Haynes Smith

Personal details
- Born: August 19, 1952 (age 73)
- Party: Democratic
- Spouse(s): Sterling Colomb, Jr.
- Children: 2

Yvonne Dorsey-Colomb (born August 19, 1952) is an American politician from the state of Louisiana who represented the 14th district in the Louisiana State Senate from 2008 until 2020. A Democrat, she is a former member of the Louisiana House of Representatives, of which she had been chosen Speaker Pro Tempore.

Dorsey-Colomb and her husband, Sterling Colomb, Jr., reside in the capital city of Baton Rouge. Sterling founded the Colomb Foundation to raise awareness of breast cancer. Though John Neely Kennedy, the state treasurer, listed the foundation as not adhering to state laws on disclosing their financial information, a later investigation found the foundation to be in compliance with all state laws.

Preceded by John Michael Guidry	Louisiana State Representative for District 67 (East Baton Rouge Parish); Yvonne Dorsey-Colomb; 1993–2008	Succeeded by Patricia Haynes Smith
Preceded by Cleo Fields	Louisiana State Senator for District 14 (East Baton Rouge Parish); Yvonne Dorsey-Colomb; 2008–2020	Succeeded by Cleo Fields
