= Louisiana's 14th State Senate district =

American legislative district

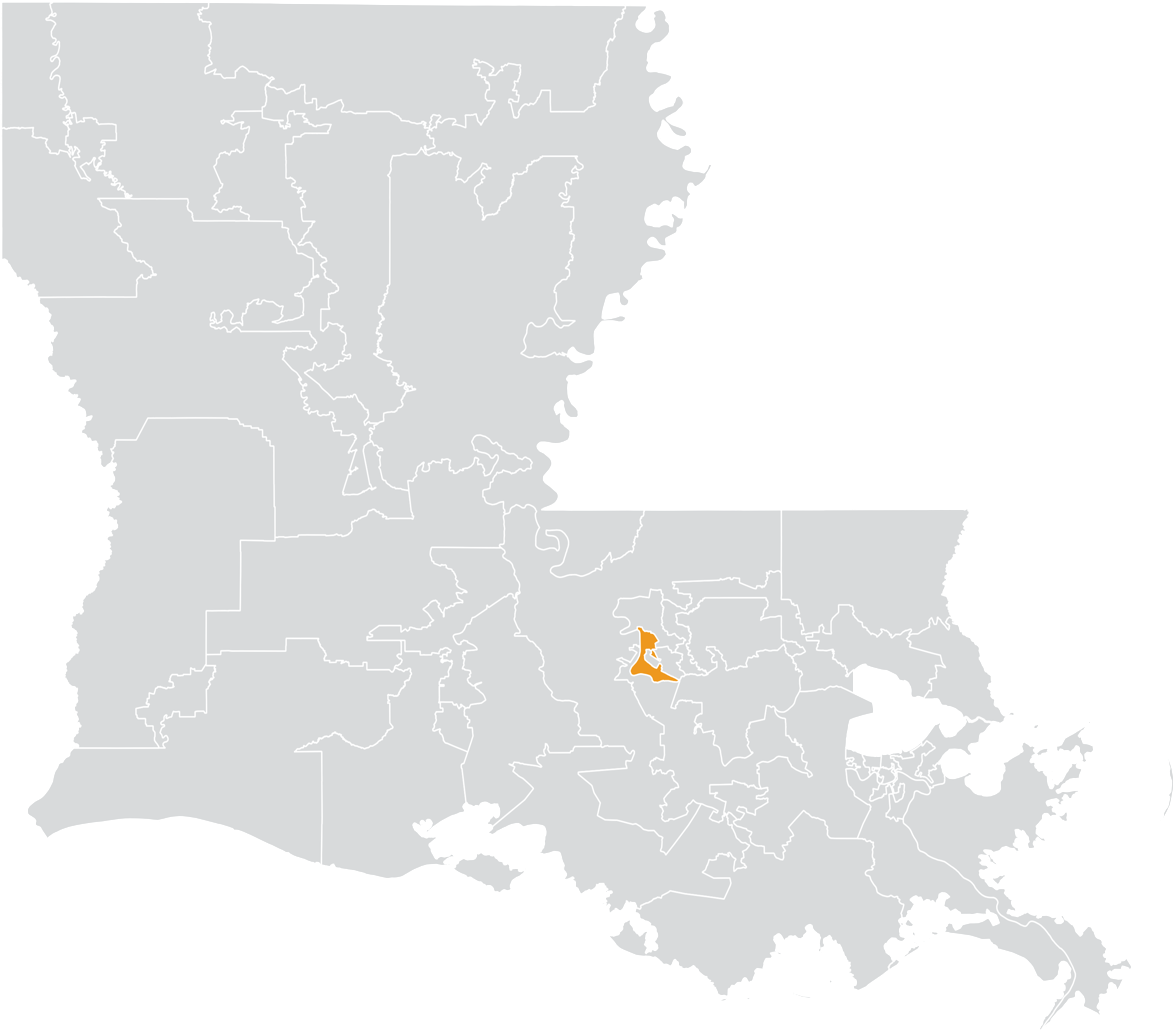
- Senator: Vacant
- Registration: 59.8% Democratic; 14.8% Republican; 25.4% No party preference
- Demographics: 31% White; 61% Black; 4% Hispanic; 2% Asian; 2% Other
- Population (2019): 112,623
- Registered voters: 68,222

Louisiana's 14th State Senate district is one of 39 districts in the Louisiana State Senate. It has been vacant since the death of Democrat Larry Selders in 2026.

== Geography ==
District 14 is located entirely within East Baton Rouge Parish, including most of downtown Baton Rouge and the main campus of Louisiana State University.

The district is split between Louisiana's 2nd and 6th congressional districts, and overlaps with the 29th, 61st, 63rd, 66th, 67th, 68th, 70th, and 101st districts of the Louisiana House of Representatives.

== Recent election results ==
Louisiana uses a jungle primary system. If no candidate receives 50% in the first round of voting, when all candidates appear on the same ballot regardless of party, the top-two finishers advance to a runoff election.

=== 2025 ===
2025 Louisiana Senate special election, District 14
| Party | Candidate | Votes | % |
|---|---|---|---|
| Democratic | Larry Selders | 4,153 | 62.4 |
| Democratic | Carolyn Hill | 1,355 | 20.4 |
| Democratic | Quentin Anthony Anderson | 1,149 | 17.3 |
| Total votes | | 6,657 | 100 |
| Democratic hold | | | |

=== 2019 ===
2019 Louisiana State Senate election, District 14
| Party | Candidate | Votes | % |
|---|---|---|---|
| Democratic | Cleo Fields | 13,529 | 52.5 |
| Democratic | Patricia Haynes Smith | 12,236 | 47.5 |
| Total votes | | 25,765 | 100 |
| Democratic hold | | | |

=== 2015 ===
2015 Louisiana State Senate election, District 14
| Party | Candidate | Votes | % |
|---|---|---|---|
| Democratic | Yvonne Dorsey-Colomb (incumbent) | Unopposed | 100 |
| Total votes | | Unopposed | 100 |
| Democratic hold | | | |

=== 2011 ===
2011 Louisiana State Senate election, District 14
| Party | Candidate | Votes | % |
|---|---|---|---|
| Democratic | Yvonne Dorsey-Colomb (incumbent) | 9,373 | 58.2 |
| Democratic | Michael Jackson | 4,540 | 28.2 |
| Republican | Christopher Toombs | 2,197 | 13.6 |
| Total votes | | 16,110 | 100 |
| Democratic hold | | | |

=== Federal and statewide results ===
| Year | Office | Results |
|---|---|---|
| 2020 | President | Biden 78.5–19.6% |
| 2019 | Governor (runoff) | Edwards 86.3–13.7% |
| 2016 | President | Clinton 78.7–17.2% |
| 2015 | Governor (runoff) | Edwards 88.7–11.3% |
| 2014 | Senate (runoff) | Landrieu 81.9–18.1% |
| 2012 | President | Obama 80.5–18.1% |
