= Louisiana's 96th House of Representatives district =

American legislative district

Louisiana's 96th State House of Representatives district
Representative
Marcus Bryant; D–New Iberia

Louisiana's 96th House of Representatives district is one of 105 Louisiana House of Representatives districts. It is currently represented by Democrat Marcus Bryant.

== Geography ==
HD96 is located entirely inside of the city of New Orleans.

== Election results ==
Year	Winning candidate	Party	Percent	Opponent	Party	Percent	Opponent	Party	Percent	Opponent	Party	Percent
2011	Terry Landry	Democratic	55.9%	Eric Martin	Independent	44.1%						
2015	Terry Landry	Democratic	84%	Raymond Lewis	Democratic	16%						
2019	Marcus Bryant	Democratic	58.4%	Robert Titus II	Independent	22.4%	Cammie Maturin	Democratic	12.1%	Patrick Isaac Wiltz	Democratic	7.1%
2023	Marcus Bryant	Democratic	(Canceled)									
