= Juan LaFonta =

American politician and personal injury attorney

Member of the Louisiana House of Representatives from the 96th district
- In office 2005 – January 9, 2012
- Succeeded by: Terry Landry Sr.

Personal details
- Born: Juan Anthony LaFonta; November 1972 (age 53) New Orleans, Louisiana, U.S.
- Party: Democratic
- Education: Southern University Law Center (J.D.); University of New Orleans (B.A.)
- Profession: Attorney

Juan Anthony LaFonta (born November 1972) is a New Orleans personal injury attorney and former Democratic State Representative for Louisiana representing Louisiana House District 96. He was elected in 2005 during a special election and was unopposed in his 2007 re-election. He runs Juan Lafonta and Associates, L.L.C.

LaFonta served as Louisiana first Freshmen legislator elected to Chairman of the Black Caucus. LaFonta also served on the Commerce Committee, the Insurance Committee, and the Retirement Committee. After Hurricane Katrina, LaFonta also served on the House Special Committee on Disaster Planning, Crisis Management, Recovery and Long-Term Revitalization.

== Early life and education ==
Juan Anthony LaFonta was born in New Orleans, Louisiana, the son of a bricklayer and a public school teacher. He graduated from Brother Martin High School and earned his B.S. from the University of New Orleans in 1997, followed by a J.D. from Southern University Law Center in 2000. He is a member of Phi Beta Sigma fraternity.

== Career ==
=== Legal career ===
LaFonta founded Juan LaFonta & Associates, LLC in 2002, a personal injury firm based in New Orleans. Over the years, the firm has represented clients in accident and wrongful-death cases. He has also served as an adjunct professor at Dillard University.

== Political career ==
=== Louisiana House of Representatives ===
LaFonta was elected in a 2005 special election to the Louisiana House of Representatives for District 96, which covers neighborhoods including Treme, Gentilly, Faubourg Marigny, and parts of the French Quarter. He was re-elected unopposed in 2007 and served until 2012.

He became the first freshman legislator in the United States to chair a state Legislative Black Caucus, leading the Louisiana Legislative Black Caucus during his first term.

As a legislator, LaFonta worked on recovery policies following Hurricane Katrina. His sponsored legislation addressed homeowner insurance settlements, disaster-related business relief, environmental impact studies, and post-storm commemoration. He also sponsored measures on scrap metal theft prevention and road safety.

=== Other campaigns ===
In 2010, LaFonta ran for the U.S. House of Representatives in Louisiana's 2nd Congressional District.

== Public recognition ==
Since 2021, LaFonta has hosted an annual Juneteenth Celebration on the New Orleans Lakefront. The free public event features food, music, fireworks, and cultural programming. As of 2025, he has organized the celebration for five consecutive years.

In 2018, LaFonta organized a free red-carpet screening of Marvel's 'Black Panther' for mentoring groups and youth organizations. In 2019, LaFonta sponsored a series of summer movie field trips for local children and families, with transportation and access covered. In 2025, he partnered with actor Anthony Mackie to surprise students with an early screening of 'Captain America: Brave New World'.

In 2017, LaFonta was crowned Mardi Gras Mambo King by the Cervantes Fundación Hispanoamericana de Arte at the New Orleans Museum of Art. The honor recognized his cultural leadership and support of New Orleans' Hispanic and multicultural communities.

LaFonta has invested in Black-owned businesses by underwriting their advertisements in barbershops and other local establishments. He also donated new uniforms to a youth football team when he learned families were struggling to afford them, stating, “This is what you do when you're blessed. You give back.”

LaFonta's advertising campaigns with local figures like Big Freedia have gained regional and national attention. A 2017 campaign featuring artist Roan Smith's portraits combined New Orleans bounce culture with legal branding, earning praise for its originality and cultural authenticity. The Fader called LaFonta's Big Freedia commercial 'possibly the most New Orleans commercial of all time'.

Since 2021, LaFonta has hosted an annual Juneteenth Celebration on the New Orleans lakefront, featuring music, fireworks, and cultural programming.

The University of New Orleans named its Multicultural Leadership Lounge in his honor in 2021.

== Views and opinions ==
LaFonta has emphasized youth mentorship and cultural representation in his public service. Drawing on his own background in the arts, he has supported creative programming for children. His initiatives have included sponsoring red-carpet screenings of films such as Black Panther (2018) and organizing summer movie field trips for local families. In 2025, he partnered with actor Anthony Mackie to provide an early screening of Captain America: Brave New World for students.

He has also invested in small Black-owned businesses, underwriting advertising in local barbershops and neighborhood establishments.

During and after his time in office, he emphasized disaster recovery, urging stronger oversight of insurance companies and a more equitable distribution of post-Katrina recovery funds. He was also active in civil rights advocacy, supporting causes such as the Jena Six march and calling for protections for displaced voters. On environmental issues, he pressed for studies of storm-related impacts in Louisiana parishes, and he has frequently stressed the need for community accountability by questioning how settlement money and legal fees are used, urging greater transparency for residents affected by disasters.

== Awards and honors ==
- Kentucky Colonel, 2007 Kentucky Colonel (2007)
- Multicultural Leadership Lounge named in his honor at the University of New Orleans in 2021
- Featured in CityBusiness and The Fader for community-rooted legal marketing and cultural advocacy.
- Mardi Gras Mambo King, Cervantes Foundation at NOMA (2017).

== See also ==
- United States House of Representatives elections in Louisiana, 2010#District 2
