= Terry Landry Jr. =

American politician

Member of the Louisiana House of Representatives from the 67th district
- Incumbent
- Assumed office May 19, 2025
- Preceded by: Larry Selders

Personal details
- Party: Democratic
- Parent: Terry Landry Sr. (father)
- Website: www.terrylandryjr.com

Terry C. Landry Jr. is an American politician from the Democratic Party of Louisiana. He was elected to the Louisiana House of Representatives in District 67 in a special election. He succeeded Larry Selders, who filled the state senate seat vacated by Cleo Fields following Fields' election to the United States House of Representatives.

Landry worked for the Southern Poverty Law Center. His father Terry Landry Sr. was also a state representative.
