= 2010 United States House of Representatives elections in Louisiana =

- November 2, 2010

All 7 Louisiana seats to the United States House of Representatives
| | Majority party | Minority party |
|---|---|---|
| Party | Republican | Democratic |
| Last election | 6 | 1 |
| Seats won | 6 | 1 |
| Seat change | Steady | Steady |
| Popular vote | 675,386 | 311,221 |
| Percentage | 65.20% | 30.04% |
| Swing | ▲8.39% | ▼8.05% |

Republican
50–60%
60–70%
70–80%
80–90%
90–100%
Democratic
50–60%
60–70%

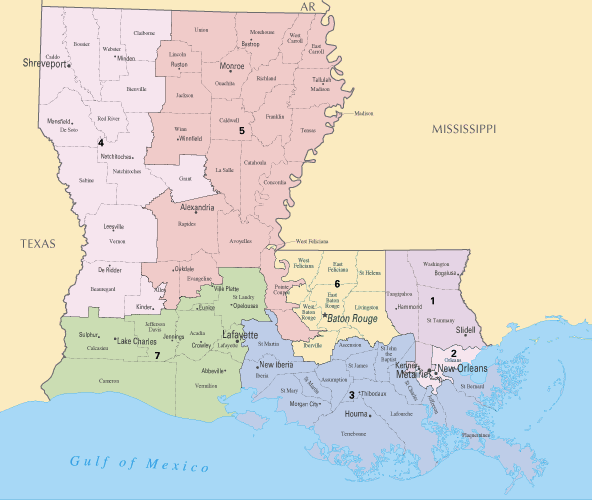
Louisiana's congressional districts in 2010

Elections were held on November 2, 2010, to determine Louisiana's seven members of the United States House of Representatives. Representatives were elected for two-year terms to serve in the 112th United States Congress from January 3, 2011, until January 3, 2013. Primary elections were held on August 28, 2010, and a runoff election for the Republican Party nomination in the 3rd district took place on October 2, 2010.

Of the seven elections, the 2nd district was rated as competitive by CQ Politics and the 2nd and 3rd districts were rated as competitive by The Cook Political Report, The Rothenberg Political Report and Sabato's Crystal Ball.

Five of Louisiana's seven incumbents (Republicans Steve Scalise of the 1st district, John Fleming of the 4th district, Rodney Alexander of the 5th district, Bill Cassidy of the 6th district and Charles Boustany of the 7th district) were re-elected. Of the two who were not re-elected, one (Republican Joseph Cao of the 2nd district) unsuccessfully sought re-election, and one (Democrat Charlie Melancon of the 3rd district) ran for the U.S. Senate instead of seeking re-election.

In Louisiana, candidates affiliated with parties that are not recognized by the state are listed on the ballot as "Other", while independent candidates are listed as "No Party". In total, six Republicans and one Democrat were elected. A total of 1,035,947 votes were cast, of which 675,386 (65 percent) were for Republican candidates, 311,221 (30 percent) were for Democratic candidates, 42,241 (4 percent) were for independent candidates and 7,099 (1 percent) were for unrecognized parties' candidates.

== Overview ==
Results of the 2010 United States House of Representatives elections in Louisiana by district:

| District | Republican | | Democratic | | Others | | Total | | Result |
| District | Votes | % | Votes | % | Votes | % | Votes | % | Result |
|---|---|---|---|---|---|---|---|---|---|
| District 1 | 157,182 | 78.52% | 38,416 | 19.19% | 4,578 | 2.29% | 200,176 | 100.0% | Republican hold |
| District 2 | 43,378 | 33.47% | 83,705 | 64.59% | 2,521 | 1.94% | 129,604 | 100.0% | Democratic gain |
| District 3 | 108,963 | 63.77% | 61,914 | 36.23% | 0 | 0.00% | 170,877 | 100.0% | Republican gain |
| District 4 | 105,223 | 62.34% | 54,609 | 32.35% | 8,962 | 5.31% | 168,794 | 100.0% | Republican hold |
| District 5 | 122,033 | 78.57% | 0 | 0.00% | 33,279 | 21.43% | 155,312 | 100.0% | Republican hold |
| District 6 | 138,607 | 65.63% | 72,577 | 34.37% | 0 | 0.00% | 211,184 | 100.0% | Republican hold |
| District 7 | – | – | – | – | – | – | – | – | Republican hold |
| Total | 675,386 | 65.20% | 311,221 | 30.04% | 49,340 | 4.76% | 1,035,947 | 100.0% | |

== District 1 ==
2010 Louisiana's 1st congressional district election
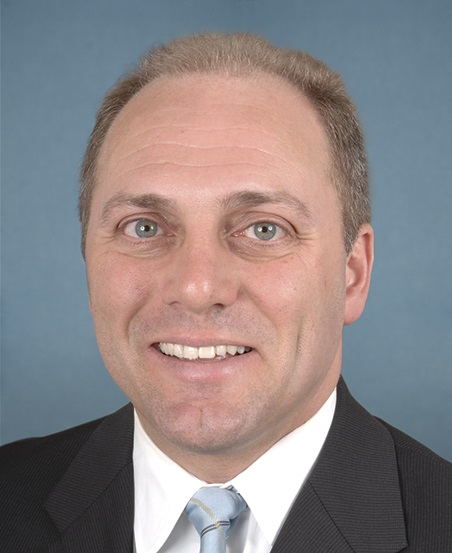

| Nominee | Steve Scalise | Myron Katz |
| Party | Republican | Democratic |
| Popular vote | 157,182 | 38,416 |
| Percentage | 78.5% | 19.2% |
- Parish results Scalise: 60–70% 70–80% 80–90%
U.S. Representative before election
Steve Scalise
Republican
Elected U.S. Representative
Steve Scalise
Republican

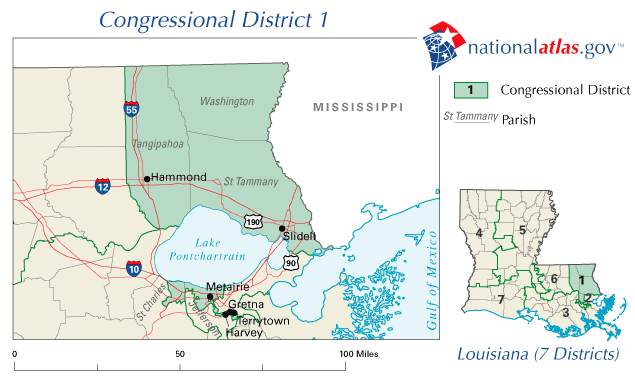
Louisiana's 1st congressional district in 2010

In 2010 the 1st district included Metairie, Slidell, and parts of Kenner and New Orleans. The district's population was 75 percent white, 16 percent black and 6 percent Hispanic (see Race and ethnicity in the United States census); 86 percent were high school graduates and 28 percent had received a bachelor's degree or higher. Its median income was $50,725. In the 2008 presidential election the district gave 72 percent of its vote to Republican nominee John McCain and 26 percent to Democratic nominee Barack Obama.

Republican Steve Scalise, who took office in May 2008, was the incumbent. Scalise was re-elected in November 2008 with 66 percent of the vote. In 2010 his opponent in the general election was Democratic nominee Myron Katz, who ran with the intention of raising awareness about energy conservation in homebuilding. Former lawyer Arden Wells, who does not belong to a party recognized by the state of Louisiana, also ran.

Scalise raised $1,358,024 and spent $1,007,474. Katz raised $64,420 and spent $60,708. Prior to the election FiveThirtyEight's forecast gave Scalise a 100 percent chance of winning and projected that he would receive 72 percent of the vote to Katz's 25 percent. On election day Scalise was re-elected with 79 percent of the vote to Katz's 19 percent. Scalise was again re-elected in 2012 and 2014.

=== Predictions ===
| Source | Ranking | As of |
|---|---|---|
| The Cook Political Report | Safe R | November 1, 2010 |
| Rothenberg | Safe R | November 1, 2010 |
| Sabato's Crystal Ball | Safe R | November 1, 2010 |
| RCP | Safe R | November 1, 2010 |
| CQ Politics | Safe R | October 28, 2010 |
| New York Times | Safe R | November 1, 2010 |
| FiveThirtyEight | Safe R | November 1, 2010 |

=== General election results ===
Louisiana's 1st district general election, 2010
| Party | Candidate | Votes | % |
|---|---|---|---|
| Republican | Steve Scalise (incumbent) | 157,182 | 78.52 |
| Democratic | Myron Katz | 38,416 | 19.19 |
| Other | Arden Wells | 4,578 | 2.29 |
| Total votes | | 200,176 | 100.00 |
| Republican hold | | | |

=== External links ===
- "Myron Katz campaign website". Archived from the original on October 29, 2010.
- "Steve Scalise campaign website". Archived from the original on October 29, 2010.

== District 2 ==
2010 Louisiana's 2nd congressional district election
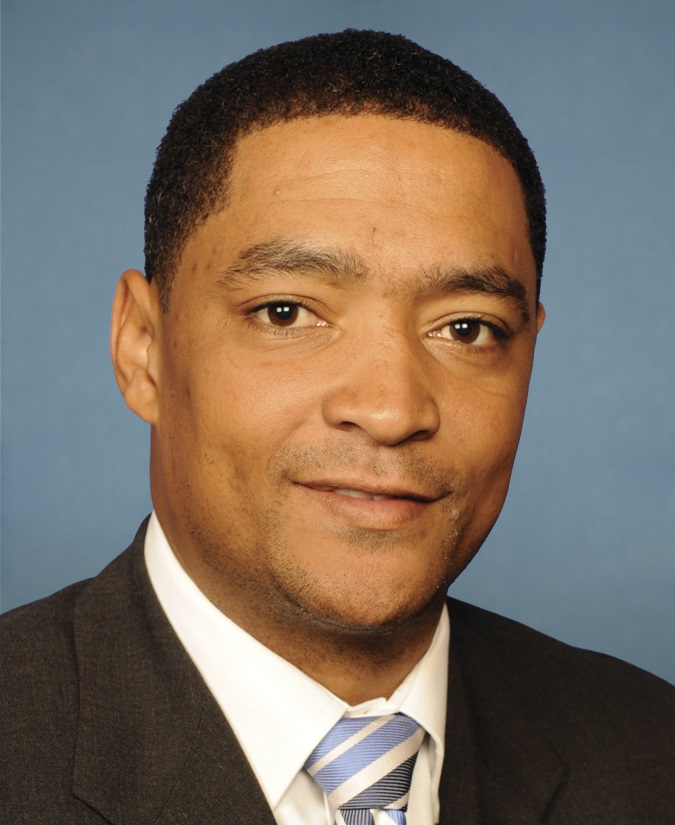

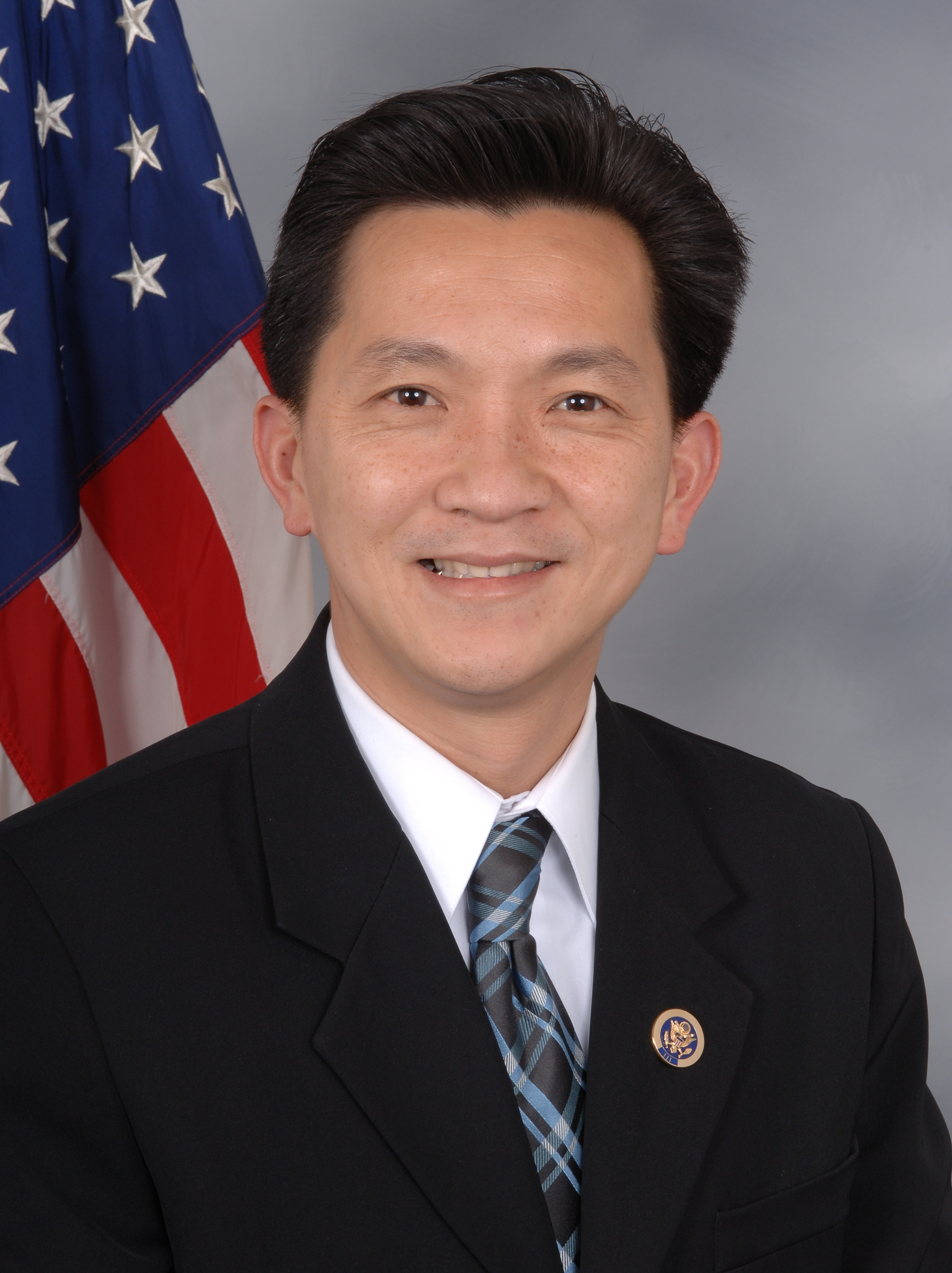
| Nominee | Cedric Richmond | Joseph Cao |
| Party | Democratic | Republican |
| Popular vote | 83,705 | 43,378 |
| Percentage | 64.6% | 33.5% |
- Parish results Richmond: 50–60% 70–80%
U.S. Representative before election
Joseph Cao
Republican
Elected U.S. Representative
Cedric Richmond
Democratic

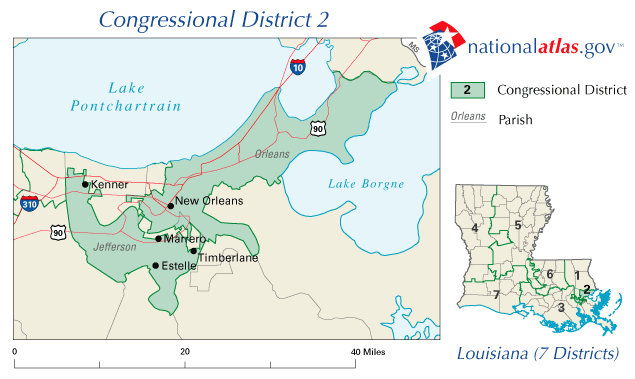
Louisiana's 2nd congressional district in 2010

The 2nd district included parts of New Orleans and Marrero. The district's population was 57 percent black, 32 percent white and 6 percent Hispanic (see Race and ethnicity in the United States census); 78 percent were high school graduates and 20 percent had received a bachelor's degree or higher. Its median income was $40,061. In the 2008 presidential election the district gave 75 percent of its vote to Democratic nominee Barack Obama and 23 percent to Republican nominee John McCain.

Republican Joseph Cao, who took office in 2009, was the incumbent. Cao was elected in 2008 with 50 percent of the vote. In 2010 Cao's opponent in the general election was Democratic nominee Cedric Richmond, a member of the Louisiana House of Representatives. Anthony Marquize, a minister and businessman; and Jack Radosta, a carpenter and actor, ran as independent candidates. Ron Austin, a lawyer, also ran as an independent candidate but ended his campaign in September 2010.

Eugene Green, the former chief of staff to U.S. Representative William J. Jefferson; Gary Johnson, a former research director for the United States House Committee on Rules; and Juan LaFonta, a member of the Louisiana House of Representatives, also sought the Democratic nomination. In a poll of 341 likely Democratic primary voters, conducted in June 2010 by Zata 3 Consulting for Richmond's campaign, 53 percent supported Richmond while 13 percent favored LaFonta and 34 percent were undecided. Karen Carter Peterson, a member of the Louisiana State Senate, said in July 2010 that she would not seek the Democratic nomination.

Cao raised $2,079,915 and spent $2,097,806. Richmond raised $1,139,879 and spent $1,134,506. Marquize raised $14,021 and spent the same amount. Austin raised $7,300 and spent the same amount. Green raised $85,248 and spent $85,395. Johnson raised $15,561 and spent $15,538. LaFonta raised $359,927 and spent $353,268.

In a poll of 400 likely voters, conducted by Market Research Insights in May and June 2010, 51 percent of respondents supported Cao while 26 percent favored Richmond. A poll published by Anzalone-Liszt in September 2010 found Richmond leading Cao by 45 percent to 35 percent. In a poll of 605 likely voters, conducted by Public Policy Polling for Daily Kos on October 2 and 3, 2010, Richmond led with 49 percent to Cao's 38 percent while 13 percent remained undecided. A poll of 500 likely voters, conducted by Zata|3 Consulting on October 20, 2010, found Richmond leading with 53 percent to Cao's 36 percent, while 2 percent supported Marquize, 1 percent chose Radosta and 8 percent were undecided. In a poll of 400 likely voters, conducted by Anzalone-Liszt on October 20 and 21, 2010, Richmond led with 49 percent to Cao's 32 percent.

Prior to the election FiveThirtyEight's forecast gave Richmond a 92 percent chance of winning, and projected that he would receive 55 percent of the vote to Cao's 42 percent. On election day Richmond was elected with 65 percent of the vote to Cao's 33 percent. Cao ran for Attorney General of Louisiana in 2011, but ended his campaign in September of that year. Richmond took office in January 2011 with the commencement of the 112th Congress, and held this seat until he resigned on January 15, 2021.

=== Democratic primary results ===
Louisiana's 2nd district Democratic primary, August 28, 2010
| Party | Candidate | Votes | % |
|---|---|---|---|
| Democratic | Cedric Richmond | 14,678 | 60.50 |
| Democratic | Juan LaFonta | 5,171 | 21.31 |
| Democratic | Eugene Green | 2,500 | 10.30 |
| Democratic | Gary Johnson | 1,914 | 7.89 |
| Total votes | | 24,263 | 100.00 |

==== Predictions ====
| Source | Ranking | As of |
|---|---|---|
| The Cook Political Report | Likely D (flip) | November 1, 2010 |
| Rothenberg | Likely D (flip) | November 1, 2010 |
| Sabato's Crystal Ball | Lean D (flip) | November 1, 2010 |
| RCP | Lean D (flip) | November 1, 2010 |
| CQ Politics | Likely D (flip) | October 28, 2010 |
| New York Times | Lean D (flip) | November 1, 2010 |
| FiveThirtyEight | Likely D (flip) | November 1, 2010 |

=== General election results ===
Louisiana's 2nd district general election, November 2, 2010
| Party | Candidate | Votes | % |
|---|---|---|---|
| Democratic | Cedric Richmond | 83,705 | 64.59 |
| Republican | Joseph Cao (incumbent) | 43,378 | 33.47 |
| Independent | Anthony Marquize | 1,876 | 1.45 |
| Independent | Jack Radosta | 645 | 0.50 |
| Total votes | | 129,604 | 100.00 |
| Democratic gain from Republican | | | |

=== External links ===
- "Joseph Cao campaign website". Archived from the original on October 28, 2010.
- "Eugene Green campaign website". Archived from the original on August 21, 2010.
- "Gary Johnson campaign website". Archived from the original on August 1, 2010.
- "Juan LaFonta campaign website". Archived from the original on September 26, 2010.
- "Anthony Marquize campaign website". Archived from the original on October 29, 2010.
- "Cedric Richmond campaign website". Archived from the original on October 29, 2010.

== District 3 ==
2010 Louisiana's 3rd congressional district election
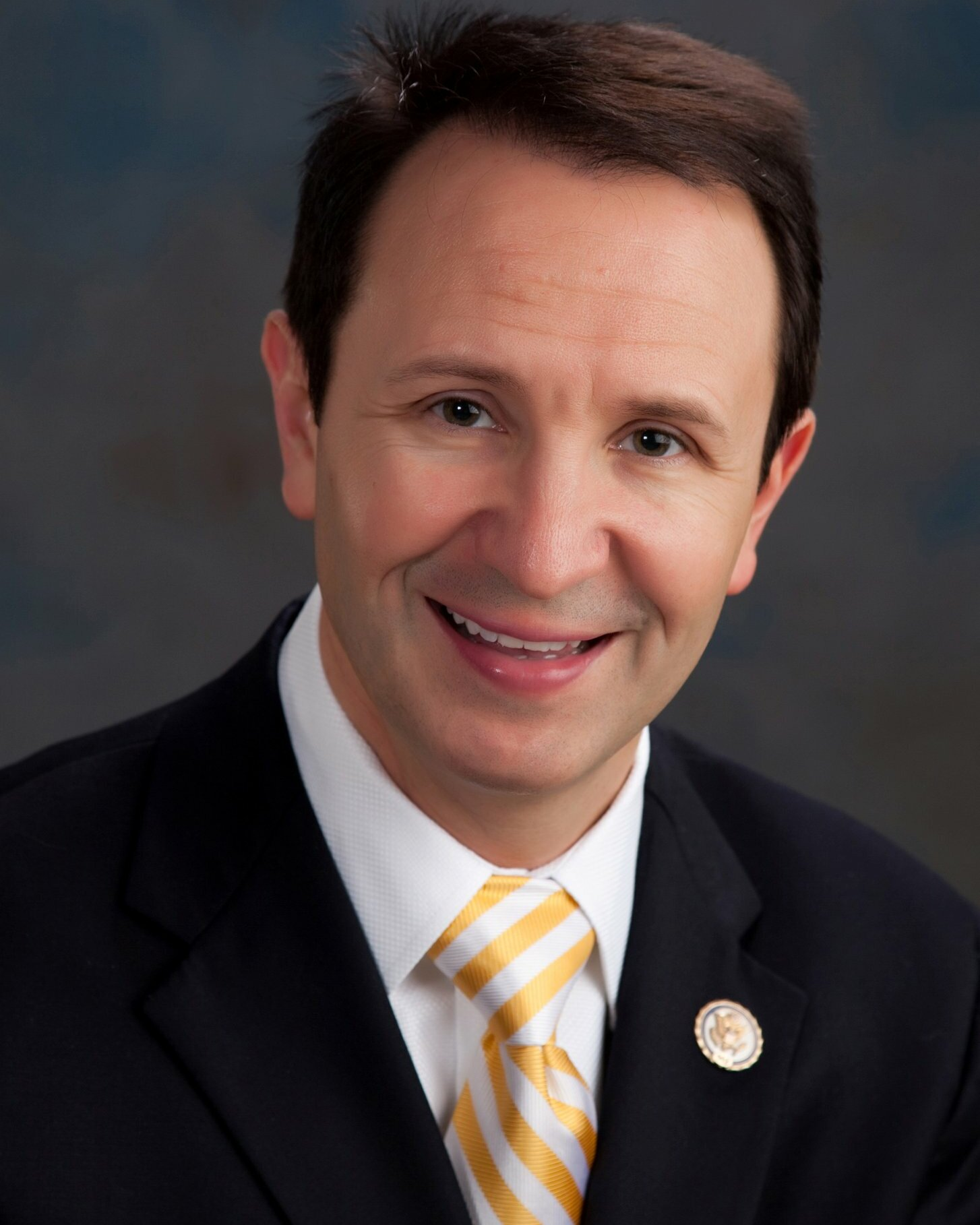

| Nominee | Jeff Landry | Hunt Downer |
| Party | Republican | Republican |
| Popular vote | 19,657 | 10,549 |
| Percentage | 65.1% | 34.9% |
- Parish results Landry: 50–60% 60–70% 70–80% Sangisetty: 50–60%
U.S. Representative before election
Charlie Melançon
Democratic
Elected U.S. Representative
Jeff Landry
Republican

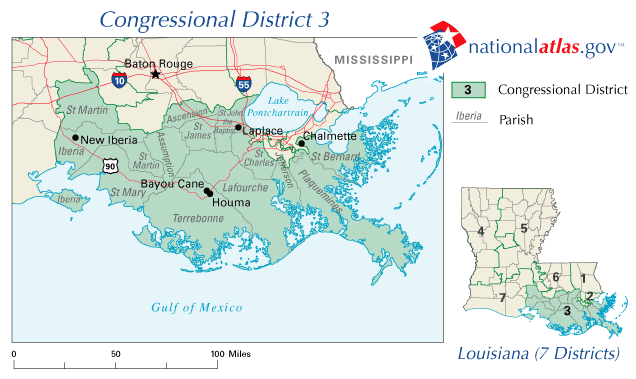
Louisiana's 3rd congressional district in 2010

The 3rd district included Houma, Laplace and New Iberia. The district's population was 66 percent white and 27 percent black (see Race and ethnicity in the United States census); 74 percent were high school graduates and 13 percent had received a bachelor's degree or higher. Its median income was $44,887. In the 2008 presidential election the district gave 61 percent of its vote to Republican nominee John McCain and 37 percent to Democratic nominee Barack Obama.

Democrat Charlie Melançon, who took office in 2005, was the incumbent. He was re-elected unopposed in 2008. In 2010, Melançon ran for the U.S. Senate rather than seeking re-election. The candidates in the general election were Democratic nominee Ravi Sangisetty and Republican nominee Jeff Landry, both lawyers. Sangisetty was unopposed in the Democratic primary. Hunt Downer, a former speaker of the Louisiana House of Representatives; and Kristian Magar, an oil field manager, also sought the Republican nomination. Both parties had attempted to recruit Scott Angelle, the Secretary of the Louisiana Department of Natural Resources, but he declined their overtures.

Sangisetty raised $828,014 and spent $836,316. Landry raised $1,362,786 and spent $1,360,649. Downer raised $698,604 and spent $700,614. Magar raised $37,751 and spent the same amount.

Prior to the election FiveThirtyEight's forecast gave Landry a 94 percent chance of winning and projected that he would receive 55 percent of the vote to Sangisetti's 43 percent. On election day Landry was elected with 64 percent of the vote to Sangisetty's 36 percent. Landry unsuccessfully ran for re-election in 2012.

=== Republican primary results ===
Louisiana's 3rd district Republican primary, August 28, 2010
| Party | Candidate | Votes | % |
|---|---|---|---|
| Republican | Jeff Landry | 10,396 | 49.62 |
| Republican | Hunt Downer | 7,570 | 36.13 |
| Republican | Kristian Magar | 2,987 | 14.26 |
| Total votes | | 20,953 | 100.00 |

=== Republican primary runoff results ===
Louisiana's 3rd district Republican primary runoff, October 2, 2010
| Party | Candidate | Votes | % |
|---|---|---|---|
| Republican | Jeff Landry | 19,657 | 65.08 |
| Republican | Hunt Downer | 10,549 | 34.92 |
| Total votes | | 30,206 | 100.00 |

==== Predictions ====
| Source | Ranking | As of |
|---|---|---|
| The Cook Political Report | Likely R (flip) | November 1, 2010 |
| Rothenberg | Likely R (flip) | November 1, 2010 |
| Sabato's Crystal Ball | Likely R (flip) | November 1, 2010 |
| RCP | Likely R (flip) | November 1, 2010 |
| CQ Politics | Likely R (flip) | October 28, 2010 |
| New York Times | Safe R (flip) | November 1, 2010 |
| FiveThirtyEight | Safe R (flip) | November 1, 2010 |

=== General election results ===
Louisiana's 3rd district general election, November 2, 2010
| Party | Candidate | Votes | % |
|---|---|---|---|
| Republican | Jeff Landry | 108,963 | 63.77 |
| Democratic | Ravi Sangisetty | 61,914 | 36.23 |
| Total votes | | 170,877 | 100.00 |
| Republican gain from Democratic | | | |

=== External links ===
- "Hunt Downer campaign website". Archived from the original on September 25, 2010.
- "Jeff Landry campaign website". Archived from the original on October 28, 2010.
- "Kristian Magar campaign website". Archived from the original on May 22, 2010.
- "Ravi Sangisetty campaign website". Archived from the original on October 28, 2010.

== District 4 ==
2010 Louisiana's 4th congressional district election
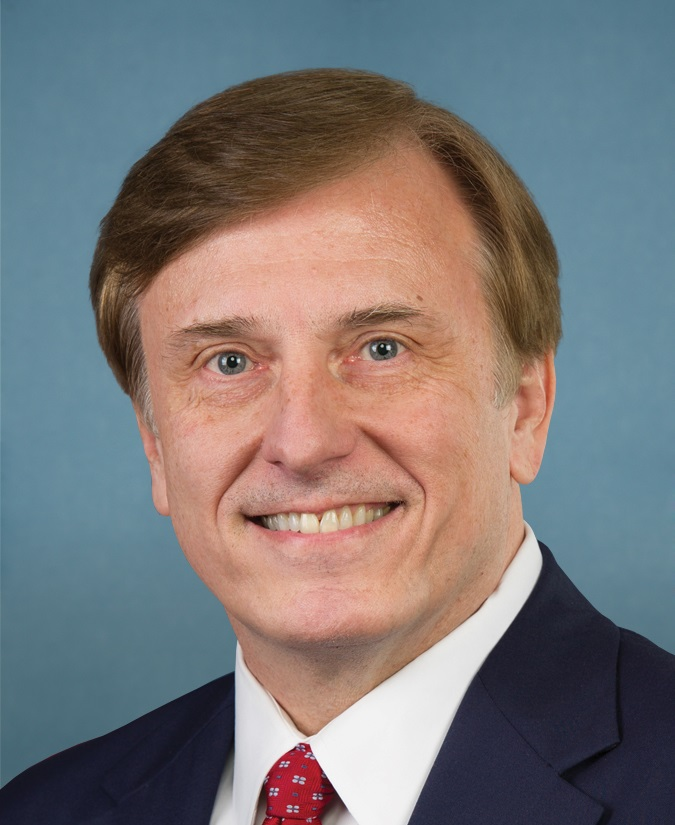

| Nominee | John Fleming | David Melville | Artis Cash |
| Party | Republican | Democratic | Independent |
| Popular vote | 105,223 | 54,609 | 8,962 |
| Percentage | 62.3% | 32.4% | 5.3% |
- Parish results Fleming: 50–60% 60–70% 70–80% 80–90%
U.S. Representative before election
John Fleming
Republican
Elected U.S. Representative
John Fleming
Republican

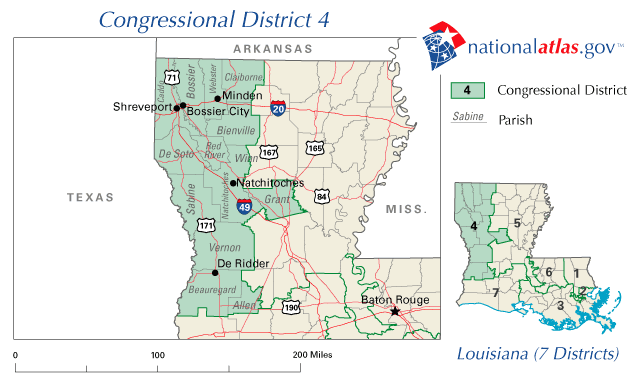
Louisiana's 4th congressional district in 2010

The 4th district included Bossier City, Natchitoches and Shreveport. The district's population was 60 percent white and 34 percent black (see Race and ethnicity in the United States census); 82 percent were high school graduates and 18 percent had received a bachelor's degree or higher. Its median income was $38,436. In the 2008 presidential election the district gave 59 percent of its vote to Republican nominee John McCain and 40 percent to Democratic nominee Barack Obama.

Republican John Fleming, who took office in 2009, was the incumbent. Fleming was elected in 2008 with 48 percent of the vote. In 2010 his opponent in the general election was Democratic nominee David Melville, a minister. Independent candidate Artis Cash also ran. Fleming was unopposed in the Republican primary. Steven Gavi, a retail manager, also sought the Democratic nomination.

Fleming raised $1,448,369 and spent $1,271,950. Melville raised $229,079 and spent $228,313. Cash raised $350 and spent no money.

Prior to the election FiveThirtyEight's forecast gave Fleming a 100 percent chance of winning and projected that he would receive 63 percent of the vote to Melville's 35 percent. On election day Fleming was re-elected with 62 percent of the vote to Melville's 32 percent. Fleming was again re-elected in 2012 and 2014.

=== Democratic primary results ===
Louisiana's 4th district Republican primary, August 28, 2010
| Party | Candidate | Votes | % |
|---|---|---|---|
| Democratic | David Melville | 10,145 | 81.10 |
| Democratic | Steven Jude Gavi | 2,365 | 18.90 |
| Total votes | | 12,510 | 100.00 |

==== Predictions ====
| Source | Ranking | As of |
|---|---|---|
| The Cook Political Report | Safe R | November 1, 2010 |
| Rothenberg | Safe R | November 1, 2010 |
| Sabato's Crystal Ball | Safe R | November 1, 2010 |
| RCP | Safe R | November 1, 2010 |
| CQ Politics | Safe R | October 28, 2010 |
| New York Times | Safe R | November 1, 2010 |
| FiveThirtyEight | Safe R | November 1, 2010 |

=== General election results ===
Louisiana's 4th district general election, November 2, 2010
| Party | Candidate | Votes | % |
|---|---|---|---|
| Republican | John Fleming (incumbent) | 105,223 | 62.34 |
| Democratic | David Melville | 54,609 | 32.35 |
| Independent | Artis Cash | 8,962 | 5.31 |
| Total votes | | 168,794 | 100.00 |
| Republican hold | | | |

=== External links ===
- "Artis Cash campaign website". Archived from the original on October 31, 2010.
- "John Fleming campaign website". Archived from the original on October 21, 2010.
- "Steven Gavi campaign website". Archived from the original on August 16, 2010.
- "David Melville campaign website". Archived from the original on October 29, 2010.

== District 5 ==
2010 Louisiana's 5th congressional district election
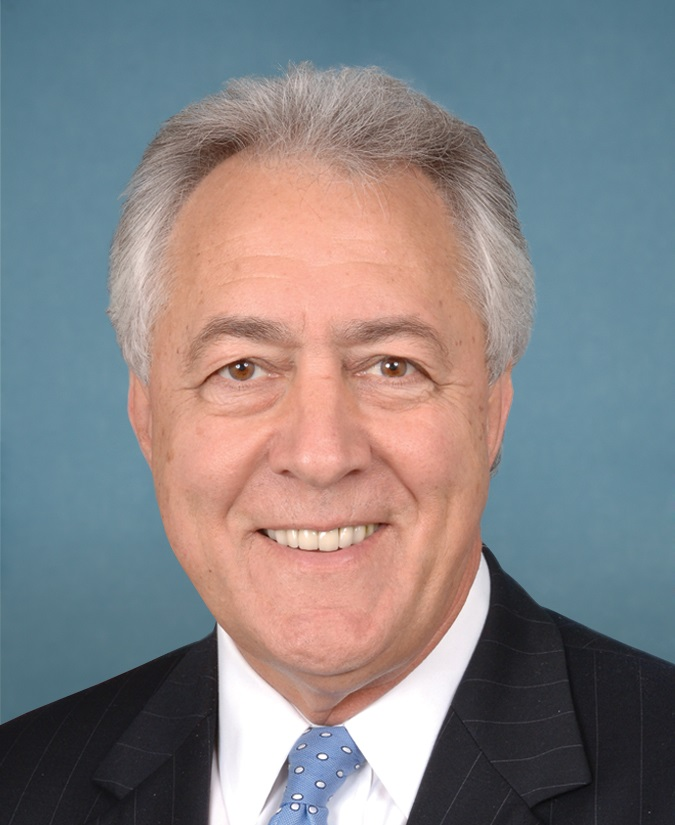

| Nominee | Rodney Alexander | Tom Gibbs Jr. |
| Party | Republican | Independent |
| Popular vote | 122,033 | 33,279 |
| Percentage | 78.6% | 21.4% |
- Parish results Alexander: 50–60% 60–70% 70–80% 80–90% 90–100%
U.S. Representative before election
Rodney Alexander
Republican
Elected U.S. Representative
Rodney Alexander
Republican

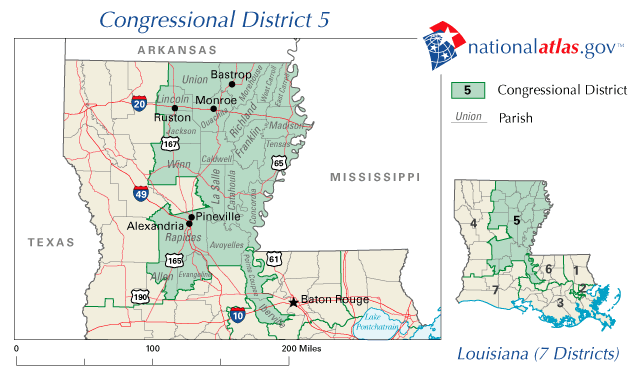
Louisiana's 5th congressional district in 2010

The 5th district included Alexandria, Monroe and Ruston. The district's population was 62 percent white and 34 percent black (see Race and ethnicity in the United States census); 77 percent were high school graduates and 17 percent had received a bachelor's degree or higher. Its median income was $35,510. In the 2008 presidential election the district gave 62 percent of its vote to Republican nominee John McCain and 37 percent to Democratic nominee Barack Obama.

Republican Rodney Alexander, who took office in 2003, was the incumbent. Alexander was re-elected unopposed in 2008. In 2010 Alexander's opponent in the general election was independent candidate Tom Gibbs, a U.S. Army veteran. Todd Slavant, the owner of a construction and property management company, also sought the Republican nomination.

Alexander raised $1,260,755 and spent $1,239,963. Prior to the election FiveThirtyEight's forecast gave Alexander a 100 percent chance of winning. On election day Alexander was re-elected with 79 percent of the vote to Gibbs's 21 percent. Alexander was again re-elected in 2012, and resigned in 2013 to become secretary of the Louisiana Department of Veterans Affairs. He was succeeded by Vance McAllister.

=== Republican primary results ===
Louisiana's 5th district Republican primary, August 28, 2010
| Party | Candidate | Votes | % |
|---|---|---|---|
| Republican | Rodney Alexander (incumbent) | 14,031 | 88.94 |
| Republican | Todd Slavant | 1,744 | 11.06 |
| Total votes | | 15,775 | 100.00 |

==== Predictions ====
| Source | Ranking | As of |
|---|---|---|
| The Cook Political Report | Safe R | November 1, 2010 |
| Rothenberg | Safe R | November 1, 2010 |
| Sabato's Crystal Ball | Safe R | November 1, 2010 |
| RCP | Safe R | November 1, 2010 |
| CQ Politics | Safe R | October 28, 2010 |
| New York Times | Safe R | November 1, 2010 |
| FiveThirtyEight | Safe R | November 1, 2010 |

=== General election results ===
Louisiana's 5th district general election, November 2, 2010
| Party | Candidate | Votes | % |
|---|---|---|---|
| Republican | Rodney Alexander (incumbent) | 122,033 | 78.57 |
| Independent | Tom Gibbs Jr. | 33,279 | 21.43 |
| Total votes | | 155,312 | 100.00 |
| Republican hold | | | |

=== External links ===
- "Rodney Alexander campaign website". Archived from the original on October 28, 2010.

== District 6 ==
2010 Louisiana's 6th congressional district election
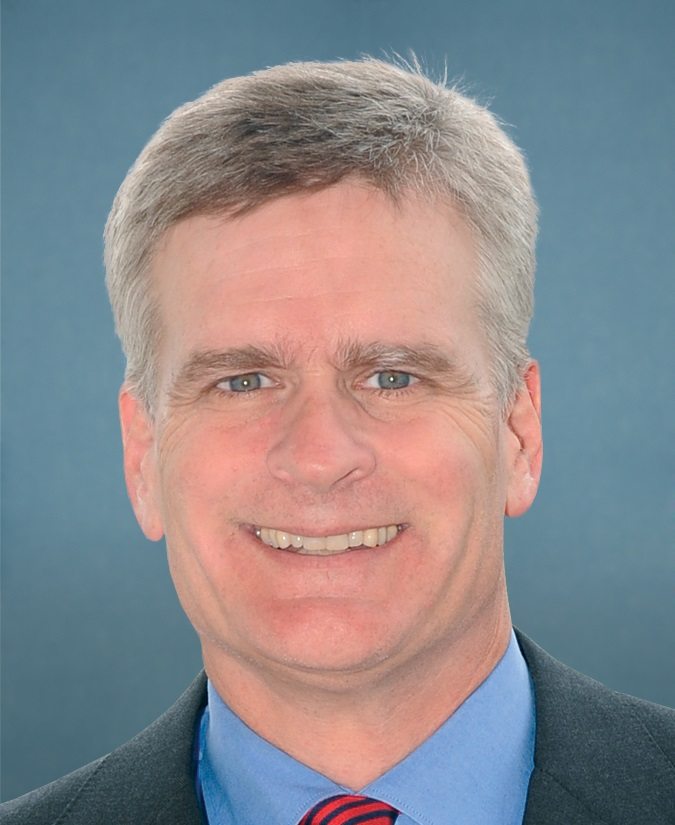

| Nominee | Bill Cassidy | Merritt E. McDonald Sr. |
| Party | Republican | Democratic |
| Popular vote | 138,607 | 72,577 |
| Percentage | 65.6% | 34.4% |
- Parish results Cassidy: 50–60% 60–70% 70–80% 80–90% Mcdonald: 50–60%
U.S. Representative before election
Bill Cassidy
Republican
Elected U.S. Representative
Bill Cassidy
Republican

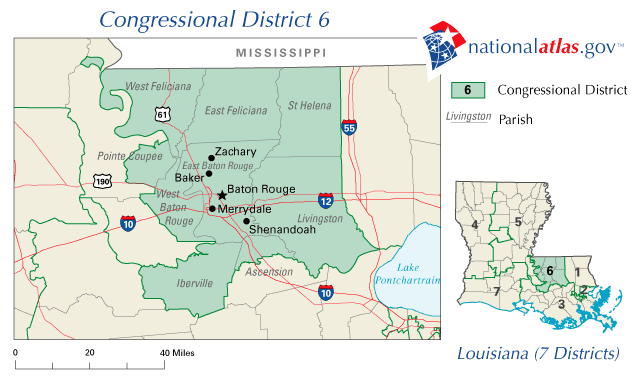
Louisiana's 6th congressional district in 2010

The 6th district included Baton Rouge and Prairieville. The district's population was 60 percent white and 34 percent black (see Race and ethnicity in the United States census); 85 percent were high school graduates and 26 percent had received a bachelor's degree or higher. Its median income was $47,840. In the 2008 presidential election the district gave 57 percent of its vote to Republican nominee John McCain and 41 percent to Democratic nominee Barack Obama.

Republican Bill Cassidy, who took office in 2009, was the incumbent. Cassidy was elected in 2008 with 48 percent of the vote. In 2010 his opponent in the general election was Democratic nominee Merritt McDonald Sr., a retired engineer. Cassidy and McDonald were both unopposed in their parties' primaries.

Cassidy raised $1,584,256 and spent $738,171. Prior to the election FiveThirtyEight's forecast gave Cassidy a 100 percent chance of winning and projected that he would receive 64 percent of the vote to McDonald's 33 percent. On election day Cassidy was re-elected with 66 percent of the vote to McDonald's 34 percent. Cassidy was again re-elected in 2012, and was elected to the U.S. Senate in 2014.

=== Predictions ===
| Source | Ranking | As of |
|---|---|---|
| The Cook Political Report | Safe R | November 1, 2010 |
| Rothenberg | Safe R | November 1, 2010 |
| Sabato's Crystal Ball | Safe R | November 1, 2010 |
| RCP | Safe R | November 1, 2010 |
| CQ Politics | Safe R | October 28, 2010 |
| New York Times | Safe R | November 1, 2010 |
| FiveThirtyEight | Safe R | November 1, 2010 |

=== General election results ===
Louisiana's 6th district general election, November 2, 2010
| Party | Candidate | Votes | % |
|---|---|---|---|
| Republican | Bill Cassidy (incumbent) | 138,607 | 65.63 |
| Democratic | Merritt E. McDonald Sr. | 72,577 | 34.37 |
| Total votes | | 211,184 | 100.00 |
| Republican hold | | | |

=== External links ===
- "Bill Cassidy campaign website". Archived from the original on October 29, 2010.

== District 7 ==
2010 Louisiana's 7th congressional district election
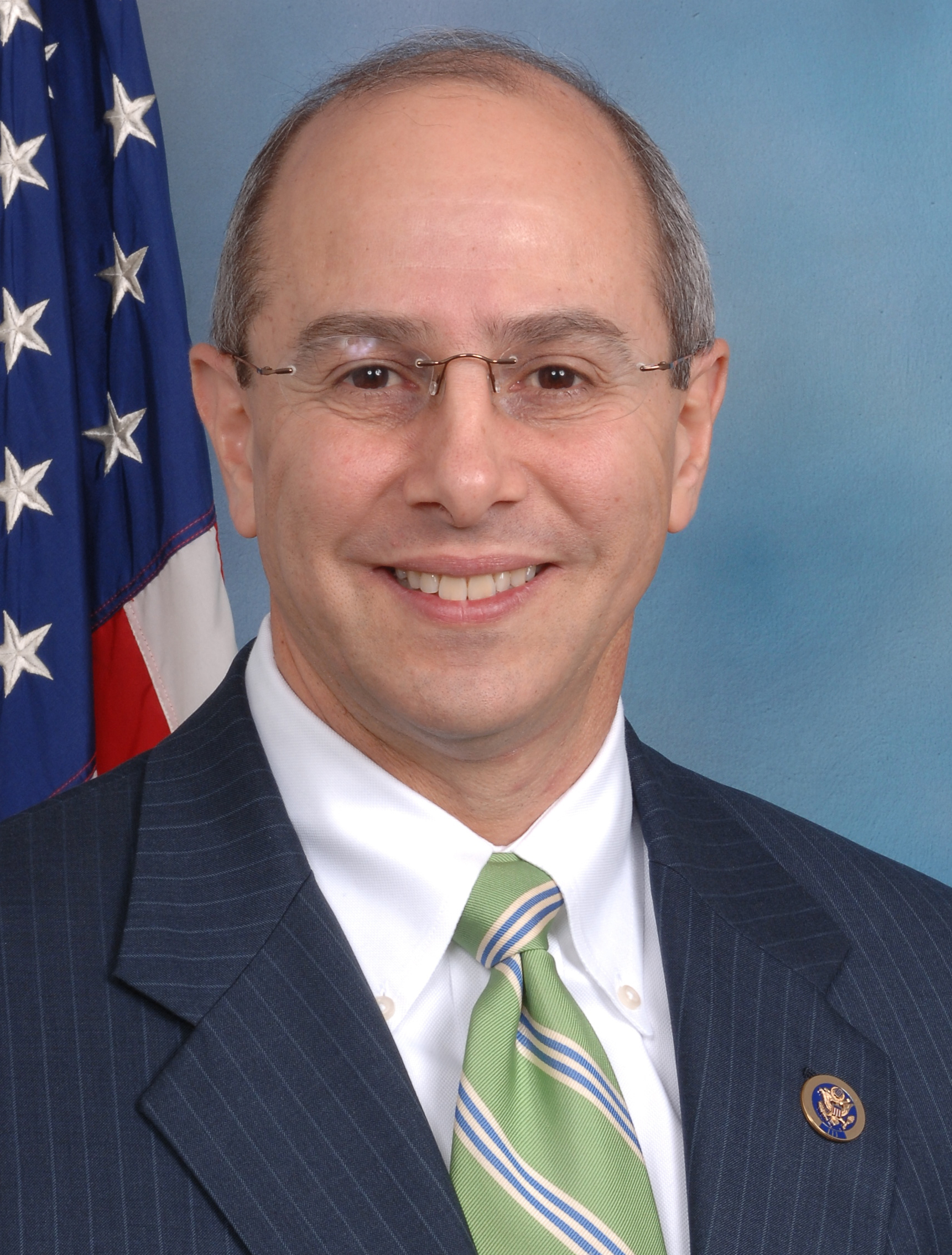
| Nominee | Charles Boustany |
| Party | Republican |
| Popular vote | Unopposed |
U.S. Representative before election
Charles Boustany
Republican
Elected U.S. Representative
Charles Boustany
Republican

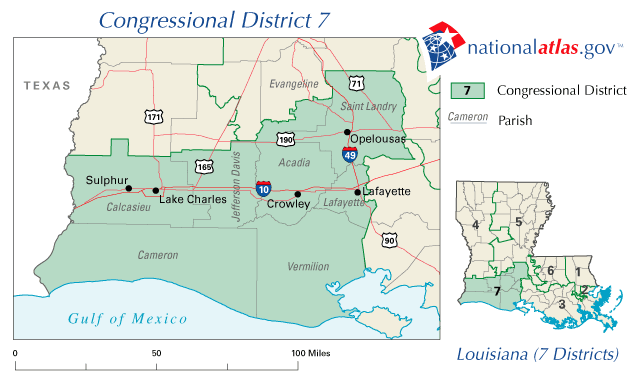
Louisiana's 7th congressional district in 2010

The 7th district included Lafayette, Lake Charles and Sulphur. The district's population was 70 percent white and 26 percent black (see Race and ethnicity in the United States census); 78 percent were high school graduates and 19 percent had received a bachelor's degree or higher. Its median income was $41,200. In the 2008 presidential election the district gave 63 percent of its vote to Republican nominee John McCain and 35 percent to Democratic nominee Barack Obama.

Republican Charles Boustany, who took office in 2005, was the incumbent. Boustany was re-elected with 62 percent of the vote in 2008. In 2010 Boustany was unopposed for re-election. According to Louisiana law, candidates who are unopposed are declared elected and their names do not appear on the ballot. Boustany raised $1,677,845 and spent $1,258,638. He was re-elected in the 3rd district in 2012 and 2014.

=== Predictions ===
| Source | Ranking | As of |
|---|---|---|
| The Cook Political Report | Safe R | November 1, 2010 |
| Rothenberg | Safe R | November 1, 2010 |
| Sabato's Crystal Ball | Safe R | November 1, 2010 |
| RCP | Safe R | November 1, 2010 |
| CQ Politics | Safe R | October 28, 2010 |
| New York Times | Safe R | November 1, 2010 |
| FiveThirtyEight | Safe R | November 1, 2010 |

=== External links ===
- "Charles Boustany campaign website". Archived from the original on October 29, 2010.

== See also ==
- List of United States representatives from Louisiana
- Louisiana's congressional delegations
