= Cleo Fields =

American politician (born 1962)

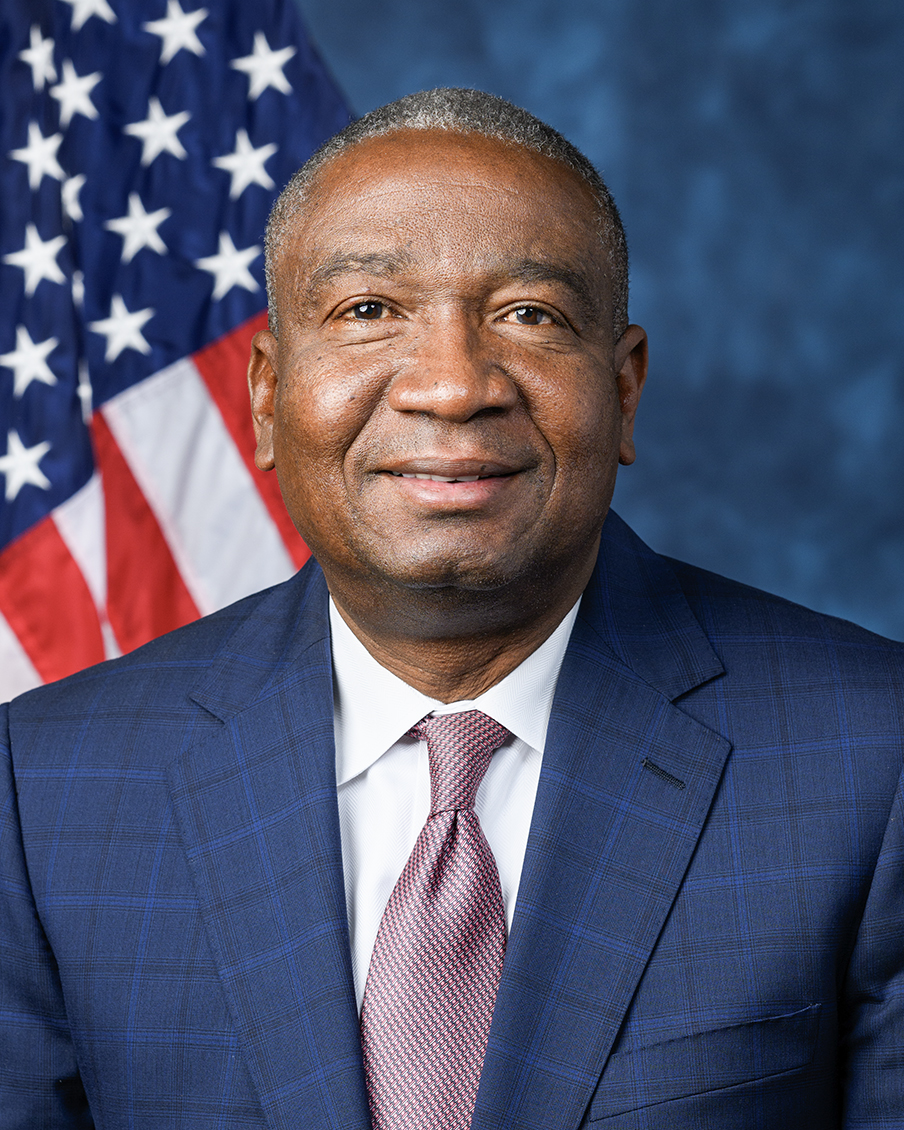
- Official portrait, 2024

Member of the U.S. House of Representatives from Louisiana
- Incumbent
- Assumed office January 3, 2025
- Preceded by: Garret Graves
- Constituency: 6th district
- In office January 3, 1993 – January 3, 1997
- Preceded by: Jim McCrery
- Succeeded by: Jim McCrery
- Constituency: 4th district

Member of the Louisiana Senate from the 14th district
- In office January 13, 2020 – January 3, 2025
- Preceded by: Yvonne Dorsey-Colomb
- Succeeded by: Larry Selders
- In office December 13, 1997 – January 2008
- Preceded by: John Guidry
- Succeeded by: Yvonne Dorsey-Colomb
- In office March 1988 – January 3, 1993
- Preceded by: Richard Turnley
- Succeeded by: John Guidry

Personal details
- Born: November 22, 1962 (age 63) Baton Rouge, Louisiana, U.S.
- Party: Democratic
- Spouse: Debra Horton
- Children: 2
- Education: Southern University (BA, JD)
- Website: House website Campaign website

Cleo C. Fields (born November 22, 1962) is an American attorney and politician who serves in the United States House of Representatives, currently representing Louisiana's 6th congressional district. He previously represented Louisiana's 4th congressional district from 1993 to 1997 and ran unsuccessfully for governor of Louisiana in 1995. He has served as a member of the Louisiana State Senate on three different occasions. Fields is a member of the Democratic Party.

Fields received his undergraduate and law degrees from Southern University in Baton Rouge. In 1980, he founded the fundraising group Young Adults for Positive Action and in 1987 he was elected to the Louisiana Senate. He ran for Congress in 1990 and was defeated but was re-elected to the State Senate for the 14th district in 1991.

Fields was elected to represent Louisiana's 4th congressional district in the House of Representatives in 1992 and re-elected in 1994. He ran for governor in 1995, coming in second in the jungle primary before losing to Mike Foster in the general election. He did not run for re-election to the House in 1996 and was succeeded by Republican John Cooksey.

Fields was elected to the State Senate in 1997 and re-elected in 2003, then ran unsuccessfully for the Louisiana Public Service Commission in 2004. On October 1, 2007, the Louisiana State Supreme Court ruled that Fields could not stand for re-election to his State Senate seat because of term limits. The state legislature had passed a law in 2006 that had defined the date of the swearing in of Fields and of the intended beneficiary, Shreveport Republican Wayne Waddell, in a way that would have allowed Fields and Waddell to stand for re-election in November 2007 and serve one more term, but the court ruled the law unconstitutional. He was elected to the seat again in 2019.

On January 23, 2024, Fields announced a campaign to return to Congress after court-ordered redistricting gave Louisiana a second Black-majority and Democratic-leaning seat. He won the November election and was sworn into the House of Representatives after a 28-year absence on January 3, 2025.

== Early life ==
Fields was born on November 22, 1962 in Baton Rouge, Louisiana and was educated at McKinley High School.

Fields attended Southern University, earning a Bachelor of Arts degree and Juris Doctor.

== Career ==
While still in law school, Fields began his first campaign for Louisiana State Senate, doing most of the organizational work himself and writing his own jingles for radio commercials. Fields began by building a base with college students in his campaign against longtime incumbent Richard Turnley. To the surprise of some experts, he unseated Turnley, who in the Commercial-Appeal referred to Fields as "a very ambitious young man and an astute campaigner."

=== U.S. House of Representatives ===
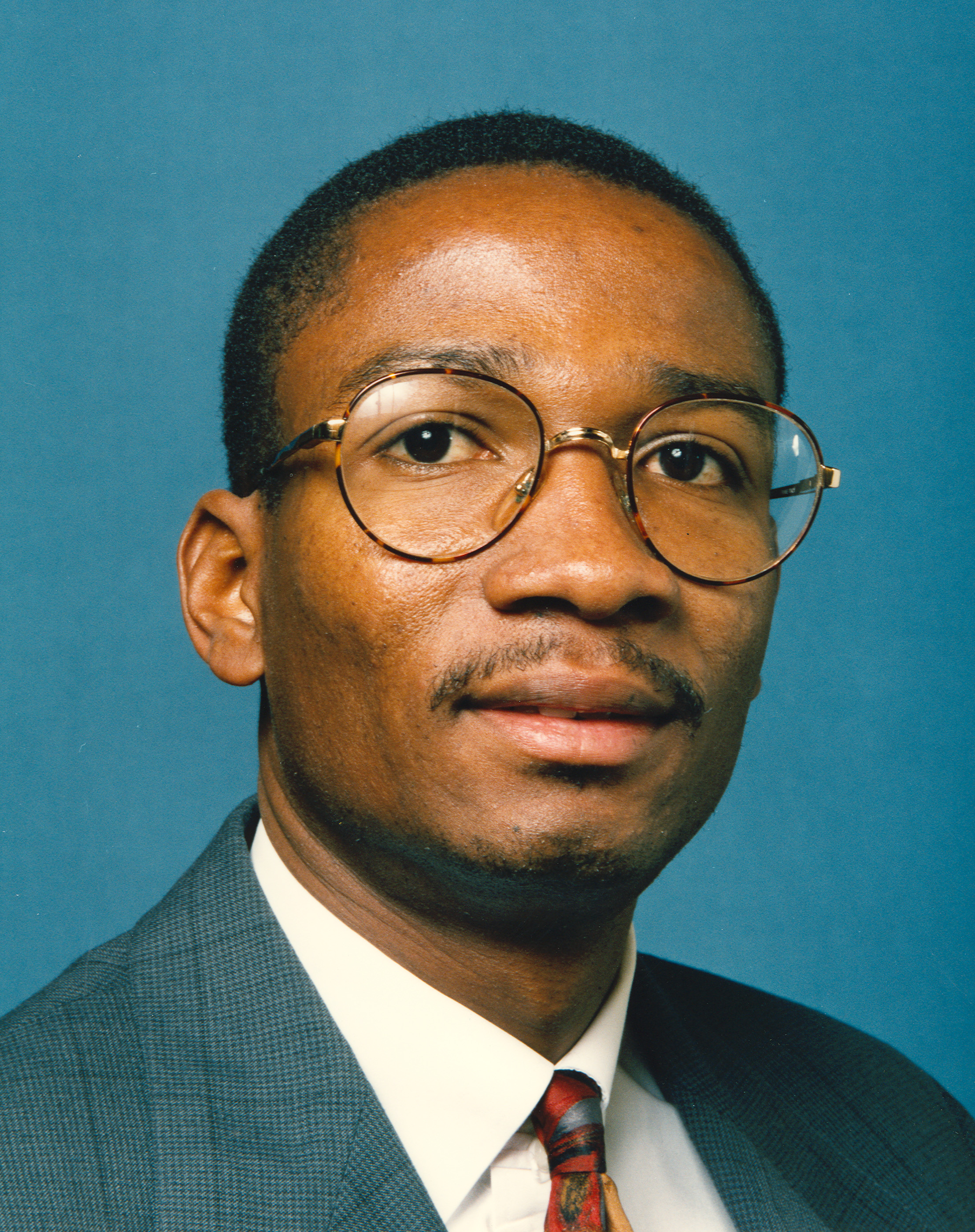
Congressional photo of Representative Cleo Fields, 1990s

Fields served in the state Senate for six years. In 1990, he entered the nonpartisan blanket primary for the 8th District, but was defeated in the first round by incumbent Republican Clyde Holloway. He ran again in 1992, this time in the newly created 4th District, a 63 percent black majority district stretching in a "Z" shape from Shreveport to Baton Rouge. He finished first in a crowded seven-way primary, coming roughly 1,500 votes short of winning outright. He was forced into a runoff against fellow state senator Charles D. Jones of Monroe, which Fields won with more than 73 percent of the vote. At thirty, he was once again the youngest legislator. He advanced his agenda in Congress through the House Small Business Committee, the House Banking, Finance, and Urban Affairs Committee, the Housing and Community Opportunity Committee, and several others.

Fields was a staunch liberal while in Congress. He received a 0 percentage rating by the Christian Coalition and the Competitive Enterprise Institute. Meanwhile, progressive interest groups such as the National Abortion Rights Action League, PeacePAC, and the American Public Health Association, as well as a range of labor-affiliated organizations, gave him a perfect rating. His efforts as a legislator often involved channeling funds into education and protecting consumers from the excesses of insurers, banks, and other such institutions. Congressional Quarterly noted that Fields "has tried to use his seats on the Banking Committee and the Small Business Committee to leverage capital for small businesses willing to relocate in his district, where poverty rates are high." Though he made many political enemies with his voting record, his personal standing in Congress remained high. When his first child was born in 1995, he won cheers from his colleagues on the floor.

Fields's district was designed to collect a larger black populace — and more black votes — than a competing version. After various challenges, referrals to higher courts, and redraws, Fields was finally able to run in his custom-designed district and trounced a nominal Republican challenger in 1994. His district woes were far from over, however, and the district was ultimately thrown out by the Supreme Court as an unconstitutional racial gerrymander. His home in Baton Rouge was placed in the 6th District of Republican Richard Baker, while the northern portions were split between the 4th and 5th districts.

=== 1995 Louisiana gubernatorial election ===
In 1995 he became a candidate for Louisiana governor. Many in his party were angered by his candidacy, since most felt that a black challenger could not seriously win the office and Mason-Dixon Polling released on October 17, 1995 showed Fields to be the loser in every possible head-to-head combination of candidates. He narrowly beat the top two white Democratic candidates in the primary and made it to a runoff with Republican Mike Foster. Though race had been a preeminent factor during his Congressional redistricting fight, Fields vowed not to emphasize color in the election, proclaiming, "I'm not running to be the African American governor, but to be the best governor," in a speech excerpted in the Chicago Tribune. "Don't vote for me because I'm black, ... don't vote against me because I'm black." His remarks in the Los Angeles Times continued this theme: "When a baby cries, it's not a white baby or a black baby — it's a hungry baby," he asserted. "When people cry for job opportunities, they're not black or white — they're unemployed." He was also outspoken in his support for gun control, which Foster opposed.

Foster's conservative message, designed by media consultant Roy Fletcher, who also had handled Cleo Fields' campaign for Congress, resonated with Louisiana's voters, who in a previous election had given former Ku Klux Klan leader David Duke nearly 40 percent of the popular vote. As the polls predicted, Fields was defeated soundly in the runoff. Exit polling showed that 95% of his votes came from the black community. During this race, Fields began a feud with fellow Democrat Mary Landrieu, whom Fields had narrowly defeated to advance to the runoff. Landrieu did not endorse him in the second round. Like many, she believed his bid had been funded by Republicans and was intended to be a spoiler to let Foster win. Fields retaliated by labeling her campaign racist and refusing to endorse her in her later race for United States Senate.

=== Louisiana State Senate ===
In 1997, Fields was again elected to the Louisiana State Senate for the 14th district. He served at the same time as his brother Wilson until Wilson Fields won a judgeship, the first time in Louisiana history that two brothers served together in the Senate. In 1997, Fields was caught on an FBI surveillance tape stuffing about $20,000 in cash in his pockets after accepting it from then Governor Edwin Edwards. Fields was not charged with a crime.

Fields served until he became ineligible to run for re-election because of term limits. An amendment to the term limits law was meant to have enabled him to run for another term, but the new law was invalidated by the Louisiana Supreme Court. He was succeeded in 2008 by Yvonne Dorsey-Colomb.

In 2019, Dorsey-Colomb was herself term-limited, and Fields ran to succeed her. On October 12, 2019, Fields was re-elected to the 14th senatorial district, making history again by becoming the first person in Louisiana to return to the Senate for the third time. He defeated State Representative Patricia Haynes Smith with 53% of the vote.

=== Return to Congress ===
In 2023, federal courts ruled that Louisiana's Congressional map, drawn after the 2020 census, was an unlawful racial gerrymander and that a second majority Black seat needed to be drawn to comply with the Voting Rights Act. The new map, featuring a second majority Black district numbered the 6th district, was finalized on January 23, 2024, and signed into law by Governor Jeff Landry. Fields announced his candidacy for the 6th district the same day. The new 6th contains much of the area Fields represented in his first stint in Congress. He won the November election to return to Congress after a 28-year absence.

In 2026, Fields was one of eight Democrats to join House Republicans in passing the Stopping Indoctrination and Protecting Kids Act, which mandated that transgender youth be outed to their parents by school professionals, and which would bar schools from teaching about any concept related to transgender topics.

After his district was again redrawn for the 2026 election, Fields announced he would not run for a fourth non-consecutive term, and instead announced a run for State Senate.

==== Committee assignments ====
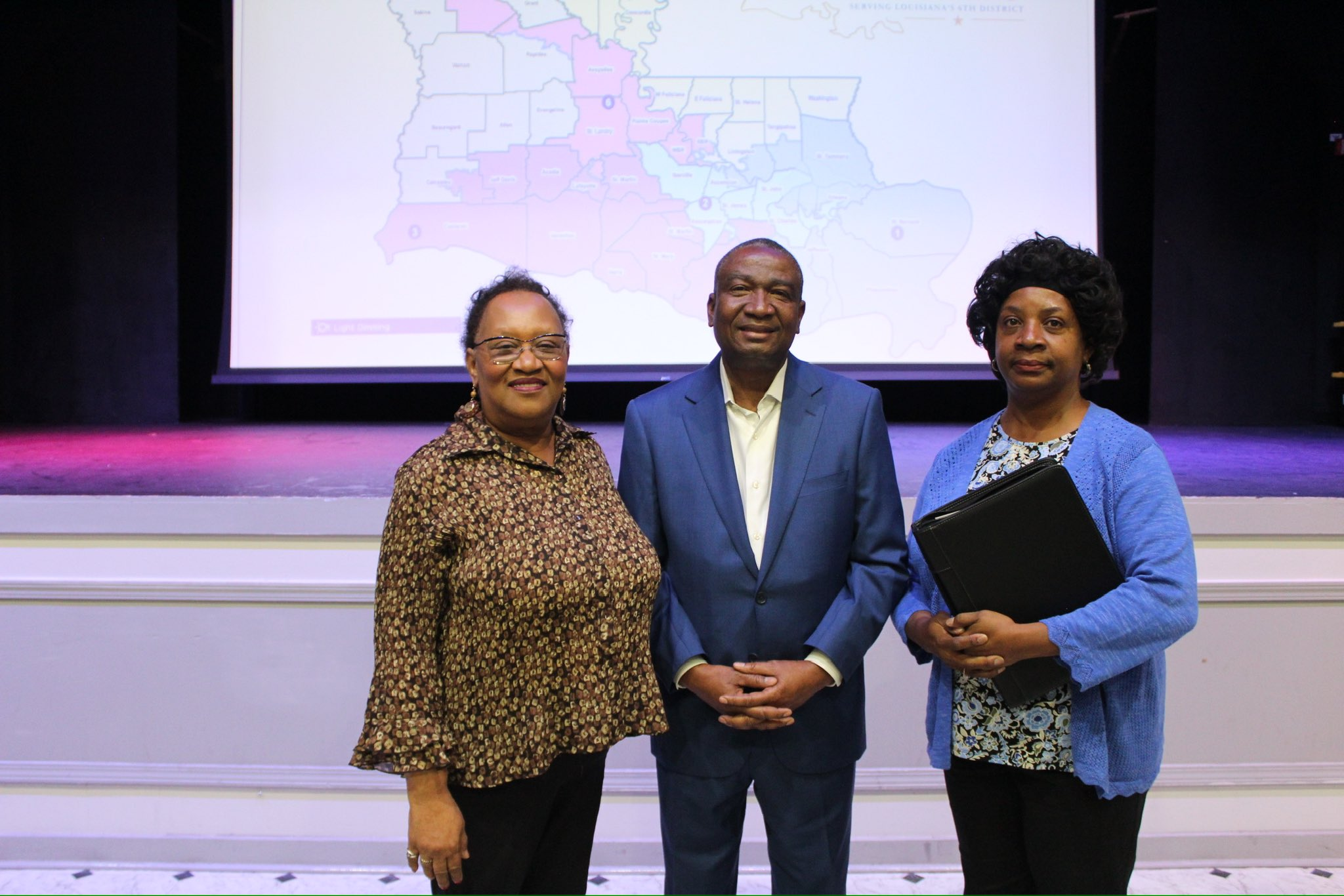
Fields at a March 2025 town hall

Rep. Fields was appointed to the Committee on Financial Services for the 119th United States Congress.

- Committee on Financial Services
  - Subcommittee on Capital Markets
  - Subcommittee on Financial Institutions
  - Subcommittee on Oversight and Investigations

==== Caucus memberships ====
- Congressional Black Caucus

== Personal life ==
Fields is a Baptist.

=== Relationship with Edwin Edwards ===
In the 1997 trial of former Louisiana Governor Edwin Edwards, prosecutors released an FBI surveillance videotape showed him receiving a large amount of cash ($20,000 to $25,000) which the FBI believed was to be used to influence votes in granting casino licenses. Fields was named an "unindicted co-conspirator," but was never formally charged. Jim Letten, leader of the prosecution team and later acting U.S. attorney, said Fields came close to being indicted. At the time, Fields stated that the incident was just an innocent business transaction between friends, and said there was a humorous explanation, which he would make public shortly thereafter. A cloud hung over Fields in Edwards' criminal trial and in the end Fields refused to deliver the promised "humorous" explanation, stating that at the time of the cash transfer, he was not an elected official, and therefore under no obligation to explain publicly.

=== "Rosa Parks sat...." ===
Fields is credited with the original version of a quotation that became popular following Barack Obama's victory in the 2008 presidential election. At the "State of the Black Union 2008" symposium in New Orleans, Louisiana in February 2008, Fields said, "Rosa Parks sat down so we could stand up. Martin Luther King marched so Jesse Jackson could run. Jesse Jackson ran so Obama could win." Another version has Fields saying, "W. E. B. Du Bois taught so that Rosa Parks could take a seat. Rosa took a seat so we all could take a stand. We all took a stand so that Martin Luther King Jr. could march. Martin marched so Jesse Jackson could run. Jesse ran so Obama could WIN." Fields's statement was shortened by the rapper Jay-Z in "My President Is Black": "Rosa Parks sat so Martin Luther could walk/ Martin Luther walked so Barack Obama could run/ Barack Obama ran so all the children could fly."

== Elections ==
Louisiana gubernatorial nonpartisan primary, 1995
Party	Candidate	Votes	%
Republican	Mike Foster	385,267	26.10
Democratic	Cleo Fields	280,921	19.03
Democratic	Mary Landrieu	271,938	18.43
Republican	Buddy Roemer	263,330	17.84
Democratic	Phil Preis	133,271	9.03
Democratic	Melinda Schwegmann	71,288	4.83
Democratic	Robert Adley	27,534	1.87
Independent	Arthur D. "Jim" Nichols	16,616	1.13
Democratic	Gene H. Alexander	5,688	0.39
Independent	Kenneth Woods	4,964	0.34
Independent	Darryl Paul Ward	4,210	0.29
Democratic	Belinda Alexandrenko	3,161	0.21
Independent	Lonnie Creech	2,338	0.16
Independent	Ronnie Glynn Johnson	1,884	0.13
Independent	Anne Thompson	1,416	0.1
Total votes		1,473,826	100

Louisiana gubernatorial election runoff, 1995
Party	Candidate	Votes	%
Republican	Mike Foster	984,499	63.5
Democratic	Cleo Fields	565,861	36.5
Total votes		1,550,360	100
Republican gain from Democratic			

Louisiana's 6th congressional district election, 2024
Party	Candidate	Votes	%
Democratic	Cleo Fields	150,323	50.8
Republican	Elbert Guillory	111,737	37.7
Democratic	Quentin Anderson	23,811	8.0
Democratic	Peter Williams	6,252	2.1
Democratic	Wilken Jones Jr.	3,910	1.3
Total votes		296,033	100.0
Democratic gain from Republican			

== See also ==
- List of African-American United States representatives

U.S. House of Representatives
Preceded by Jim McCrery	Member of the U.S. House of Representatives from Louisiana's 4th congressional district 1993–1997	Succeeded by John Cooksey
Preceded by Garret Graves	Member of the U.S. House of Representatives from Louisiana's 6th congressional district 2025–present	Incumbent
Honorary titles
Preceded by Jim Nussle	Baby of the House; 1993–1995	Succeeded by Patrick Kennedy
Party political offices
Preceded by Edwin Edwards	Democratic nominee for Governor of Louisiana; 1995	Succeeded by Bill Jefferson
U.S. order of precedence (ceremonial)
Preceded by Rudy Yakym	United States representatives by seniority 290th	Succeeded by Mark Alford
