= 2012 United States House of Representatives elections in Louisiana =

- November 6, 2012

All 6 Louisiana seats to the United States House of Representatives
	Majority party	Minority party	Third party
Party	Republican	Democratic	Libertarian
Last election	6	1	0
Seats won	5	1	0
Seat change	▼1	Steady	Steady
Popular vote	1,143,027	359,190	124,572
Percentage	67.02%	21.06%	7.30%
Swing	▲1.82%	▼8.98%

Republican
50–60%
60–70%
70–80%
80–90%
90>%
Democratic
40–50%
50–60%
60–70%
80–90%

The 2012 United States House of Representatives elections in Louisiana were held on Tuesday, November 6, 2012, and elected the six U.S. representatives from the state of Louisiana, one from each of the state's six congressional districts, a loss of one seat following reapportionment according to the results of the 2010 census. The elections coincided with elections for other federal and state offices, including a quadrennial presidential election. A jungle primary took place on November 6, with a runoff, if necessary, scheduled for December 8.

== Overview ==
United States House of Representatives elections in Louisiana, 2012
Party	Votes	Percentage	Seats	+/–
Republican	1,143,027	67.02%	5	-1
Democratic	359,190	21.06%	1	—
Libertarian	124,572	7.30%	0	—
Independents	78,828	4.62%	0	—
Totals	1,705,617	100.00%	6	—

== Redistricting ==
During the redistricting process, U.S. Representative Charles Boustany advocated a plan which, rather than drawing his home and that of Landry into the same district (as the bill which became law did), would instead make fellow Republican representative John Fleming's district potentially more competitive. Fleming later said of Boustany, "I don't feel like I can trust anything he says. Everything he told me, he reneged on."

Due to difficulties reaching a consensus among the congressional delegation, U.S. Representatives Rodney Alexander, Bill Cassidy, Fleming, Jeff Landry and Steve Scalise wrote to Governor Bobby Jindal requesting that the state legislature postpone the redistricting process for a year.

Nonetheless, a redistricting bill was passed by the Louisiana House of Representatives and Louisiana Senate, and was signed into law by Jindal on April 14, 2011.

Louisiana is among the states which, according to a provision of the 1965 Voting Rights Act enacted upon states with a history of denial of voting rights, must submit legislative maps to the U.S. Department of Justice for approval in order to ascertain that the purpose and effects of the map are not discriminatory.

== District 1 ==
2012 Louisiana's 1st congressional district election
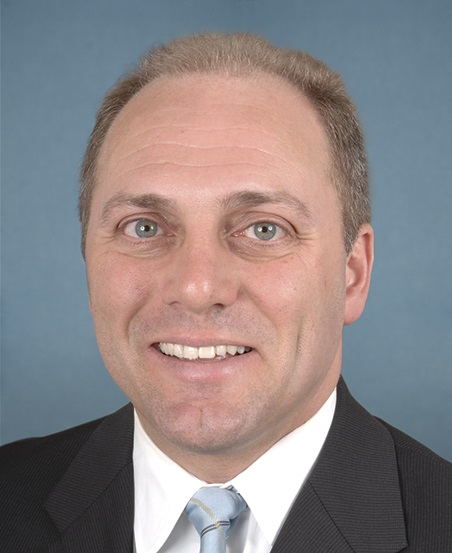

Candidate	Steve Scalise	M. V. "Vinny" Mendoza	Gary King
Party	Republican	Democratic	Republican
Popular vote	193,496	61,703	24,844
Percentage	66.6%	21.3%	8.5%
- Parish results Scalise: 50–60% 70–80%
U.S. Representative before election
Steve Scalise
Republican
Elected U.S. Representative
Steve Scalise
Republican

Republican Steve Scalise, who has represented the 1st district since 2008, is running for re-election. In redistricting the 1st district has been extended from Metairie towards the Gulf Coast, including areas from the old 3rd district. and includes the cities of Slidell and Houma, and the two parishes hardest hit by Hurricane Katrina, St. Bernard and Plaquemines. It comprises 373,405 White Americans registered voters, 46,542 African Americans and 30,126 people of other ethnicities. Of its voters, 167,824 are affiliated to the Democratic Party, 167,336 to the Republican Party, and 114,913 to neither party.

=== Candidates ===
==== Republican Party ====
- Gary King
- Steve Scalise, incumbent U.S. Representative

==== Democratic Party ====
- M.V. "Vinny" Mendoza, organic farmer, Air Force veteran, and perennial candidate

==== Independents ====
- David "Turk" Turknett
- Arden Wells, candidate for this seat in 2010

=== General election ===
==== Predictions ====
Source	Ranking	As of
The Cook Political Report	Safe R	November 5, 2012
Rothenberg	Safe R	November 2, 2012
Roll Call	Safe R	November 4, 2012
Sabato's Crystal Ball	Safe R	November 5, 2012
NY Times	Safe R	November 4, 2012
RCP	Safe R	November 4, 2012
The Hill	Safe R	November 4, 2012

==== Results ====
Louisiana's 1st congressional district, 2012
Party	Candidate	Votes	%
Republican	Steve Scalise (incumbent)	193,496	66.6
Democratic	M. V. "Vinny" Mendoza	61,703	21.3
Republican	Gary King	24,844	8.5
Independent	David "Turk" Turknett	6,079	2.1
Independent	Arden Wells	4,288	1.5
Total votes		290,410	100.0
Republican hold			

== District 2 ==
2012 Louisiana's 2nd congressional district election
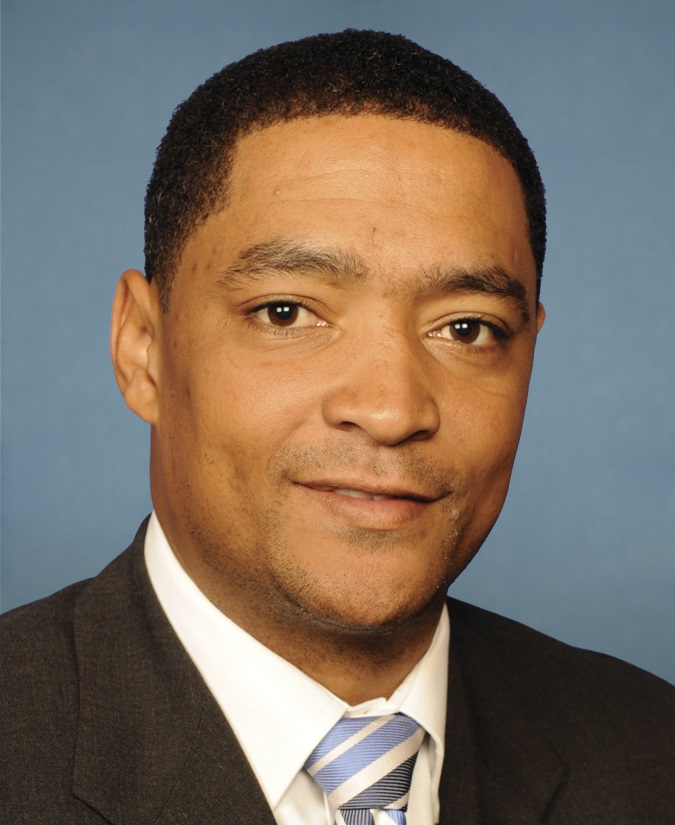

Candidate	Cedric Richmond	Gary Landrieu	Dwayne Bailey
Party	Democratic	Democratic	Republican
Popular vote	158,501	71,916	38,801
Percentage	55.2%	25.0%	13.5%
- Parish results Richmond: 30–40% 40–50% 50–60% 60–70% Landrieu: 30–40% 40–50% Bailey: 30–40%
U.S. Representative before election
Cedric Richmond
Democratic
Elected U.S. Representative
Cedric Richmond
Democratic

Democrat Cedric Richmond, who has represented the 2nd district since January 2011, is running for re-election. In redistricting, the district was extended in redistricting to include areas of the old 3rd and 6th district, along the Mississippi River to include Baton Rouge. It comprises 144,721 White Americans registered voters, 276,668 African Americans and 27,558 people of other ethnicities. Of its voters, 302,120 are Democrats, 51,268 are Republicans, and 95,559 are affiliated to neither party.

=== Candidates ===
==== Democratic Party ====
- Gary Landrieu, real estate developer and cousin of New Orleans Mayor Mitch Landrieu and U.S. Senator Mary Landrieu
- Cedric Richmond, incumbent U.S. Representative

==== Republican Party ====
- Dwayne Bailey, refinery worker
- Josue Larose, Super PAC organizer

==== Libertarian Party ====
- Caleb Trotter, banker and law school student

=== General election ===
==== Predictions ====
Source	Ranking	As of
The Cook Political Report	Safe D	November 5, 2012
Rothenberg	Safe D	November 2, 2012
Roll Call	Safe D	November 4, 2012
Sabato's Crystal Ball	Safe D	November 5, 2012
NY Times	Safe D	November 4, 2012
RCP	Safe D	November 4, 2012
The Hill	Safe D	November 4, 2012

==== Results ====
Louisiana's 2nd congressional district, 2012
Party	Candidate	Votes	%
Democratic	Cedric Richmond (incumbent)	158,501	55.2
Democratic	Gary Landrieu	71,916	25.0
Republican	Dwayne Bailey	38,801	13.5
Republican	Josue Larose	11,345	3.9
Libertarian	Caleb Trotter	6,791	2.4
Total votes		287,354	100.0
Democratic hold			

== District 3 ==
2012 Louisiana's 3rd congressional district election
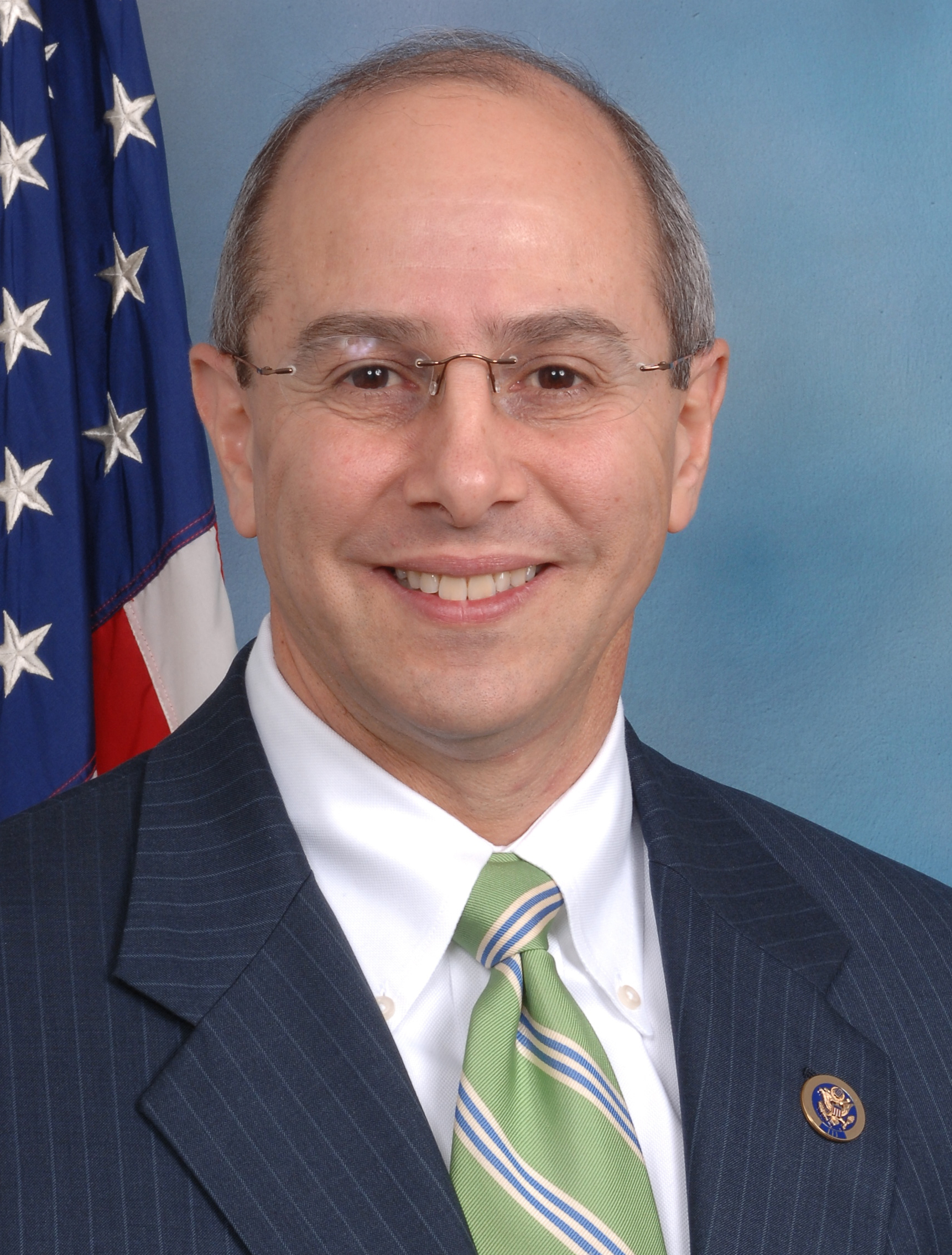

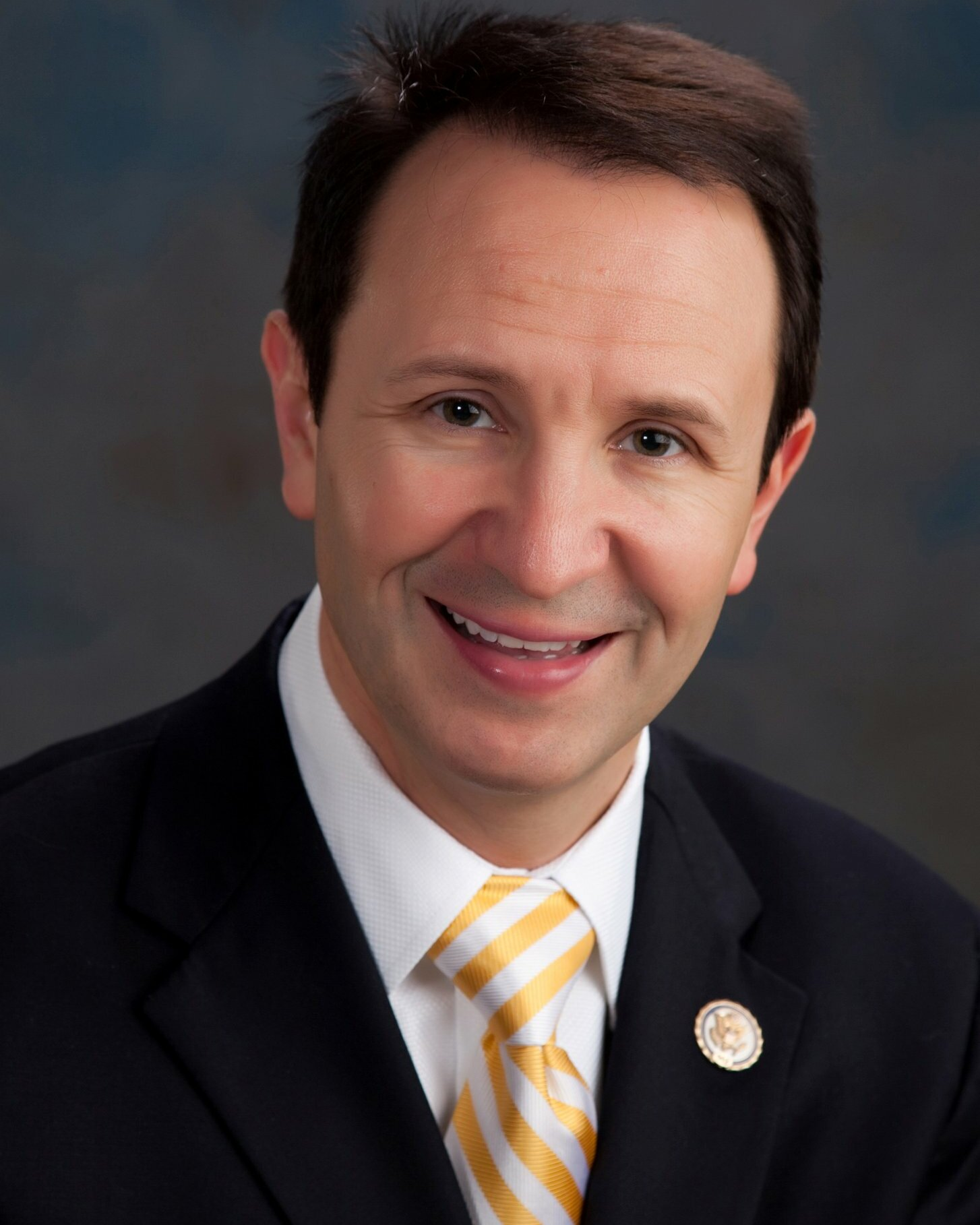

Candidate	Charles Boustany	Jeff Landry	Ron Richard
Party	Republican	Republican	Democratic
First round	139,123; 44.7%	93,527; 30.0%	67,070; 21.5%
Runoff	58,820; 60.9%	37,767; 39.1%	Eliminated
- Boustany: 40–50% 50–60% 60–70% 70–80% Landry: 40–50% 50–60% 60–70%
U.S. Representative before election
Charles Boustany (Republican)
Jeff Landry (Republican)
Elected U.S. Representative
Charles Boustany
Republican

The 3rd district includes the homes of Republican incumbents Jeff Landry and Charles Boustany, who have represented the 3rd district since January 2011 and the now-defunct 7th district since 2005 respectively. It comprises 336,889 White Americans registered voters, 107,033 African Americans and 14,497 people of other ethnicities. Of its voters, 229,704 are Democrats, 120,787 are Republicans, and 107,928 are affiliated to neither party.

The district is located in southern Louisiana and stretches from the Texas border to Iberia and St. Martin parishes. It incorporates Lake Charles and Lafayette, which were centers of population in Boustany's former district. Terrebonne and Lafourche Parishes, which form a part of the district Landry currently represents, will no longer be in the 3rd district.

=== Candidates ===
==== Republican Party ====
- Bryan Barrilleaux, physician
- Charles Boustany, incumbent U.S. Representative for the 7th district
- Jeff Landry, incumbent U.S. Representative

==== Democratic Party ====
- Ron Richard, attorney

==== Libertarian Party ====
- Jim Stark, truck driver

=== General election ===
==== Results ====
Louisiana's 3rd congressional district, 2012 (jungle primary)
Party	Candidate	Votes	%
Republican	Charles Boustany (incumbent)	139,123	44.7
Republican	Jeff Landry (incumbent)	93,527	30.0
Democratic	Ron Richard	67,070	21.5
Republican	Bryan Barrilleaux	7,908	2.6
Libertarian	Jim Stark	3,765	1.2
Total votes		311,393	100.0

==== Predictions ====
Source	Ranking	As of
The Cook Political Report	Safe R	November 5, 2012
Rothenberg	Safe R	November 2, 2012
Roll Call	Safe R	November 4, 2012
Sabato's Crystal Ball	Safe R	November 5, 2012
NY Times	Safe R	November 4, 2012
RCP	Safe R	November 4, 2012
The Hill	Safe R	November 4, 2012

==== Runoff ====
Louisiana's 3rd congressional district, 2012 (runoff)
Party	Candidate	Votes	%
Republican	Charles W. Boustany, Jr. (incumbent)	58,820	60.9
Republican	Jeff Landry (incumbent)	37,767	39.1
Total votes		96,587	100.0
Republican hold			

== District 4 ==
2012 Louisiana's 4th congressional district election
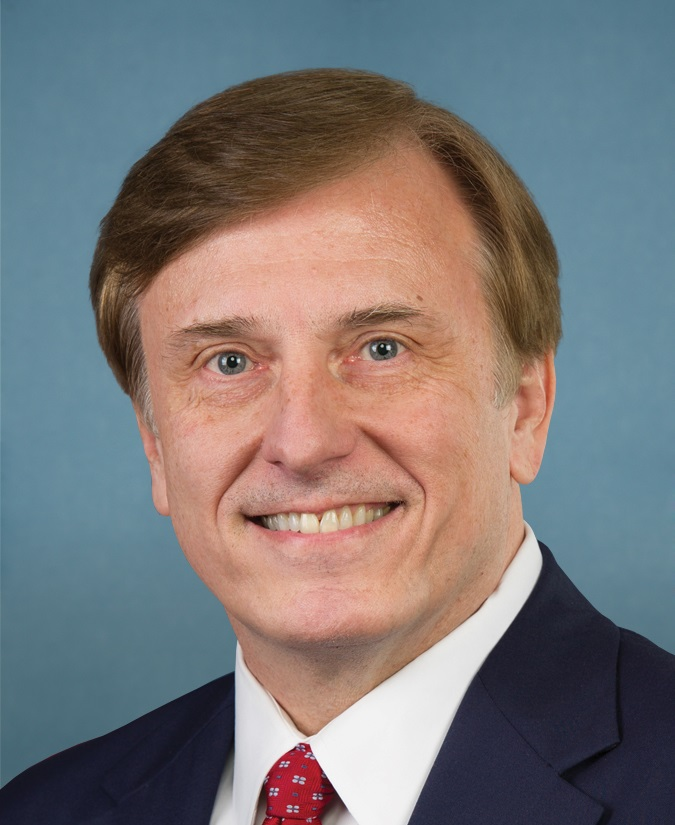

Candidate	John Fleming	Randall Lord
Party	Republican	Libertarian
Popular vote	187,894	61,637
Percentage	75.3%	24.7%
- Parish results Fleming: 60–70% 70–80% 80–90%
U.S. Representative before election
John Fleming
Republican
Elected U.S. Representative
John Fleming
Republican

Republican John Fleming, who has represented the 4th district since 2009, is running for re-election. The district comprises 276,373 White Americans registered voters, 140,630 African Americans and 15,020 people of other ethnicities. Of its voters, 221,187 are Democrats, 118,015 are Republicans, and 92,721 are affiliated to neither party. Its boundaries remain similar to those of its previous incarnation: it is anchored by Shreveport and borders Texas and Arkansas.

=== Candidates ===
==== Republican Party ====
- John Fleming, incumbent U.S. Representative

==== Libertarian Party ====
- Randall Lord, former chiropractor

==== Democratic Party ====
===== Declined =====
- Brian Crawford, Shreveport's assistant chief administrative officer and former fire chief
- Keith Hightower, former mayor of Shreveport
- Kyle Robinson, attorney
- Patrick Williams, state representative

=== General election ===
==== Predictions ====
Source	Ranking	As of
The Cook Political Report	Safe R	November 5, 2012
Rothenberg	Safe R	November 2, 2012
Roll Call	Safe R	November 4, 2012
Sabato's Crystal Ball	Safe R	November 5, 2012
NY Times	Safe R	November 4, 2012
RCP	Safe R	November 4, 2012
The Hill	Safe R	November 4, 2012

==== Results ====
Louisiana's 4th congressional district, 2012
Party	Candidate	Votes	%
Republican	John Fleming (incumbent)	187,894	75.3
Libertarian	Randall Lord	61,637	24.7
Total votes		249,531	100.0
Republican hold			

== District 5 ==
2012 Louisiana's 5th congressional district election
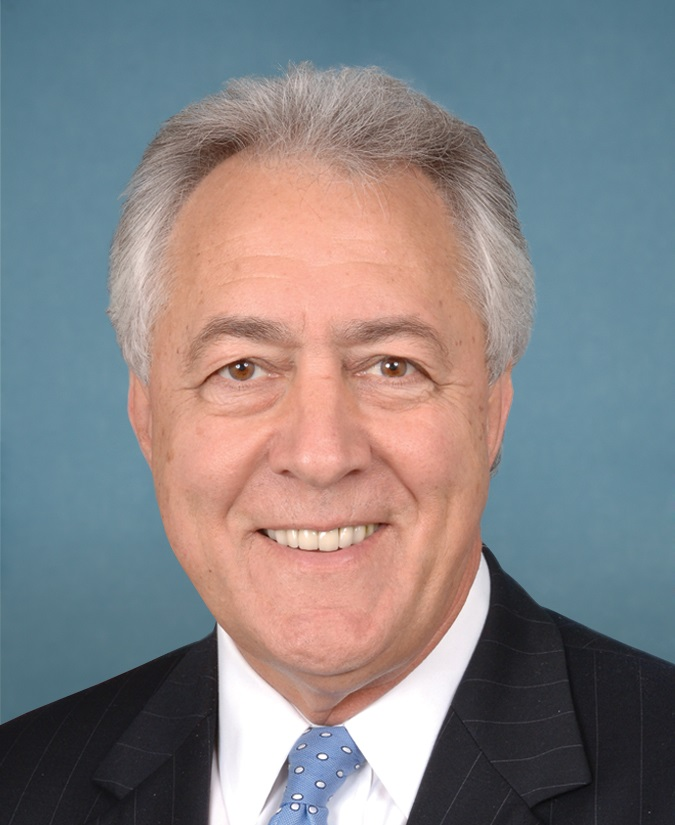

Candidate	Rodney Alexander	Ron Ceasar	Clay Steven Grant
Party	Republican	Independent	Libertarian
Popular vote	202,536	37,486	20,194
Percentage	77.8%	14.4%	7.8%
- Parish results Alexander: 50–60% 60–70% 70–80% 80–90%
U.S. Representative before election
Rodney Alexander
Republican
Elected U.S. Representative
Rodney Alexander
Republican

Republican Rodney Alexander, who has represented the 5th district since 2003, is running for re-election. The district comprises 294,830 White Americans registered voters, 144,744 African Americans and 11,107 people of other ethnicities. Of its voters, 239,963 are Democrats, 117,624 are Republicans, and 93,094 are affiliated to neither party. The make-up of the 5th district, which mostly covers the northeast of the state, now takes in the northern reaches of the Florida Parishes north of Baton Rouge, which were a part of the old 1st and 6th districts.

=== Candidates ===
==== Republican Party ====
- Rodney Alexander, incumbent U.S. Representative

==== Libertarian Party ====
- Clay Grant, businessman

==== Independents ====
- Ron Caesar, 2011 Louisiana gubernatorial candidate

=== General election ===
==== Predictions ====
Source	Ranking	As of
The Cook Political Report	Safe R	November 5, 2012
Rothenberg	Safe R	November 2, 2012
Roll Call	Safe R	November 4, 2012
Sabato's Crystal Ball	Safe R	November 5, 2012
NY Times	Safe R	November 4, 2012
RCP	Safe R	November 4, 2012
The Hill	Safe R	November 4, 2012

==== Results ====
Louisiana's 5th congressional district, 2012
Party	Candidate	Votes	%
Republican	Rodney Alexander (incumbent)	202,536	77.8
Independent	Ron Ceasar	37,486	14.4
Libertarian	Clay Steven Grant	20,194	7.8
Total votes		260,216	100.0
Republican hold			

== District 6 ==
2012 Louisiana's 6th congressional district election
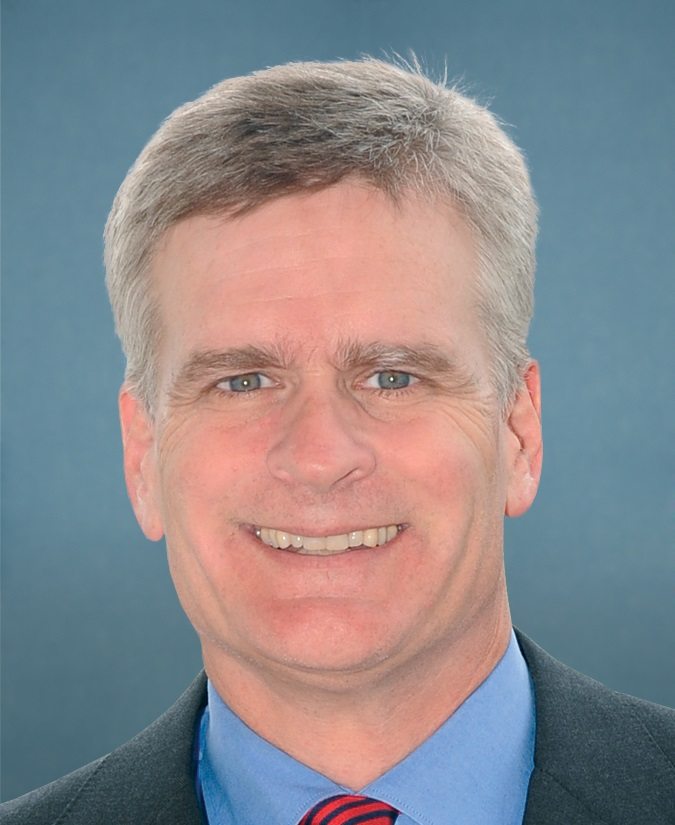

Candidate	Bill Cassidy	Rufus Holt Craig	Richard "RPT" Torregano
Party	Republican	Libertarian	Independent
Popular vote	243,553	37,486	30,975
Percentage	79.4%	10.5%	10.1%
- Parish results Cassidy: 60–70% 70–80% 80–90%
U.S. Representative before election
Bill Cassidy
Republican
Elected U.S. Representative
Bill Cassidy
Republican

Republican Bill Cassidy, who has represented the 6th district since 2009, is running for re-election. The district comprises 334,899 White Americans registered voters, 88,460 African Americans and 16,873 people of other ethnicities. Of its voters, 194,088 are Democrats, 143,160 are Republicans, and 102,984 are affiliated to neither party. It includes the suburbs of Baton Rouge and extends south as far as the outskirts of Houma.

=== Candidates ===
==== Republican Party ====
- Bill Cassidy, incumbent U.S. Representative

==== Libertarian Party ====
- Rufus Holt Craig Jr., lawyer and 2004 Democratic candidate for Louisiana's 6th congressional district

==== Independents ====
- Richard "RPT" Torregano, technician

=== General election ===
==== Predictions ====
Source	Ranking	As of
The Cook Political Report	Safe R	November 5, 2012
Rothenberg	Safe R	November 2, 2012
Roll Call	Safe R	November 4, 2012
Sabato's Crystal Ball	Safe R	November 5, 2012
NY Times	Safe R	November 4, 2012
RCP	Safe R	November 4, 2012
The Hill	Safe R	November 4, 2012

==== Results ====
Louisiana's 6th congressional district, 2012
Party	Candidate	Votes	%
Republican	Bill Cassidy (incumbent)	243,553	79.4
Libertarian	Rufus Holt Craig	32,185	10.5
Independent	Richard "RPT" Torregano	30,975	10.1
Total votes		306,713	100.0
Republican hold			
