= Marcus Bryant (politician) =

American politician

Member of the Louisiana House of Representatives from the 96th district
- Incumbent
- Assumed office January 13, 2020
- Preceded by: Terry Landry Sr.

Personal details
- Born: Marcus Anthony Bryant
- Party: Democratic
- Children: 3
- Education: Southern University (BA, JD)

Marcus Anthony Bryant is an American attorney and politician serving as a member of the Louisiana House of Representatives from the 96th district. He assumed office on January 13, 2020.

== Education ==
Bryant earned a Bachelor of Arts degree in English from Southern University and a Juris Doctor from the Southern University Law Center.

== Career ==
In 2007 and 2008, Bryant was a clerk for the United States District Court for the Western District of Louisiana. He also owns an independent law firm, where he specializes in injury law. Bryant was elected to the Louisiana House of Representatives in November 2019 and assumed office on January 13, 2020.
