= Larry Selders =

American politician (1981/1982–2026)

- Portrait of Selders, c. 2024

Member of the Louisiana Senate from the 14th district
- In office March 11, 2025 – July 7, 2026
- Preceded by: Cleo Fields

Member of the Louisiana House of Representatives from the 67th district
- In office January 13, 2020 – March 10, 2025
- Preceded by: Patricia Haynes Smith
- Succeeded by: Terry Landry Jr.

Personal details
- Born: 1981 or 1982
- Died: July 7, 2026 (aged 44) Baton Rouge, Louisiana, U.S.
- Party: Democratic
- Spouse: Kendra Michael
- Children: 2
- Education: Southern University (BS)

Larry C. Selders (1981 or 1982 – July 7, 2026) was an American politician who served as a member of the Louisiana Senate from the 14th district from 2025 until his death in 2026. He previously represented the 67th district in the Louisiana House of Representatives from 2020 to 2025.

== Early life and education ==
Larry C. Selders attended Louisiana State University Laboratory School. He earned a Bachelor of Science degree in social work from Southern University in 2005. He worked for Collis Temple Jr., a group home for troubled adolescents, while in college.

== Career ==
Selders served as treasurer and commissioner on the board of commissioners of Baton Rouge Recreation and Parks Commission (BREC), the parks and recreation agency in East Baton Rouge Parish, Louisiana. He also worked as an executive director of Focused Family Services, a mental health and substance abuse clinic in Baton Rouge. He started Selders Development Group, a real estate company and invested in properties mostly in Old South Baton Rouge. Selders was elected to the Louisiana House of Representatives in November 2019, defeating Leah Cullins in a runoff election. He succeeded Patricia Haynes Smith, who was term limited. He took office on January 13, 2020, and served until his resignation on February 27, 2025, with an effective end date of March 10, 2025. He served on the agriculture, forestry, aquaculture, and rural development; health and welfare; and the ways and means committees. He also served on the joint legislative committee on capital outlay and the house select committee on homeland security. In 2021, he sponsored a bill that made Juneteenth a state holiday in Louisiana. He was elected to the Louisiana Senate in a 2025 special election.

== DWI Arrest ==
Selders was arrested for DWI, reckless operation, and driving under suspension in the early morning hours of August 21, 2022. He was accused of speeding and doing burnouts while over the legal limit near the LSU campus, in his legislative district. Selders subsequently issued an apology for the arrest on social media.

== Personal life and death ==
Selders married Kendra Michael. They had two sons Larry Jr and Luke. In May 2026, Selders had a surgery for a heart aneurysm. He died on July 7, 2026, at the age of 44, at his son's football practice at BREC Memorial Stadium in Baton Rouge.
