= Terry Landry Sr. =

American politician

Member of the Louisiana House of Representatives
- In office January 2012 – January 13, 2020
- Preceded by: Juan LaFonta
- Succeeded by: Marcus Bryant
- Constituency: District 96

Personal details
- Born: May 31, 1951 (age 75) New Iberia, Louisiana
- Party: Democratic
- Children: Terry Landry Jr.

Terry Clyde Landry Sr. is an American politician from the Democratic Party of Louisiana. He was a member of the Louisiana House of Representatives from 2012 to 2020. He was the first African-American superintendent of the Louisiana State Police. After the 2015 Lafayette shooting, Rep. Landry called for gun control measures.

In 2025, his son Terry Landry Jr. was elected to the state house in a special election.
