= Patricia Haynes Smith =

African-American politician

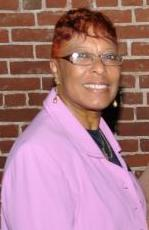

Member of the Louisiana House of Representatives from the 67th district
- In office 2008 – January 13, 2020
- Succeeded by: Larry Selders

Personal details
- Born: 1946 (age 79–80) Baton Rouge, Louisiana, U.S.
- Party: Democratic
- Education: Kent State University (BS)

Patricia Haynes Smith (born 1946) is an American politician who served as a member of the Louisiana House of Representatives from 2008 to 2020, representing District 67. Smith is affiliated with the Democratic party. Her platform focused on promoting access to healthcare and other resources for underprivileged communities and improving education in public schools.

== Early life and education ==
Smith was born in Baton Rouge, Louisiana. She earned a Bachelor of Science degree in education from Kent State University.

== Career ==
Smith worked as a teacher in Ashtabula Area City Schools in Ashtabula, Ohio. She also worked in public relations for ExxonMobil and as a university coordinator at Louisiana State University.

In 2007, Smith defeated Lorri Burgess for district 67 representative. She raised $142,416 for her campaign, with her top donors being the Baton Rouge Area Chamber of commerce and the Louisiana Manufacturers Association. Her platform focused on access to healthcare and improving education in public schools. She took office in 2008. As a representative, Smith served on the Appropriations, Education, House Executive, and Joint Legislative committees.

In 2014, Smith joined with gay rights group Equality Louisiana to draft and sponsor House Bill 12, which made sodomy legal in Louisiana. The same year, she took a stand with other lawmakers to argue for increased spending on healthcare to prevent hospitals from falling into the "Jindal Gap."

In 2016, Smith spoke at rallies at Baton Rouge City Hall following the killing of Alton Sterling by police.

In 2017, the Human Rights Watch released a report which criticized Louisiana state prisons for failing to provide HIV testing and treatment for prisoners. Smith announced plans to file two resolutions asking the state's Department of Health and Hospitals to increase testing and treatment within the prison system. She was vice chair of the Southern Regional Education Board's Legislative Advisory Council from 2018 to 2019.

In 2019, Smith ran for Louisiana State Senate, representing district 14. However, she lost in the primary. She left office on January 13, 2020. Smith serves as the chair of the Louisiana Legislative Black Caucus and was elected to 1st vice president of the National Organization of Black Elected Legislative Women at their 2017 annual conference.

== Personal life ==
Smith is married and has six children, twelve grandchildren, and two great-grandchildren.

== Awards ==
- 2019 Spirit of Service Award by Teen Health Network
- 2018 Profiles and Courage Award by The Supported Living Network
- 2017 Friend of Education by Louisiana Federation of Teachers
- 2017 Elected Official of the Year by Governor's Office of Disability Affairs
- 2017 Elected Women of Excellence Award by National Foundation for Women Legislators
- 2015 Brotherhood Sisterhood Award
- 2014 J.K. Haynes Sr. Award of Advocacy in Action
- 2014 Woman of the Year by The National Organization of Black Elected Legislative Women (N.O.B.E.L.-Women)
