= Schön =

Schön may refer to:

- Schön (surname), German surname
- Schön!, English-language fashion magazine
- Schön Klinik, clinic group based in Prien am Chiemsee, Germany
- Schön Palace, palace in Sosnowiec, Poland
- Schön Properties, real estate developer in Dubai
- Schön scandal, scandal involving German physicist Jan Hendrik Schön and his articles about semiconductors

== See also ==
- Schein
- Schoen
