= Schön Palace =

Schön Palace or Schoen Palace may refer to:

- Ernst Schön Palace in Sosnowiec-Środula
- Franz Schön Palace in Sosnowiec-Sielec
