= Schön (surname) =

Schön is a German surname, which means handsome or beautiful, from the Middle High German schoene, meaning "beautiful", "friendly", "nice". Schon means "already" and "yet". Alternative spellings include Schon and Schoen.

Notable people with the surname include:

- Adolf Schön (1906–1987), German cyclist
- Alfred Schön (born 1962), German football player and manager
- Andreas Schön (born 1989), German footballer
- Donald Schön (1930–1997), American philosopher
- Douglas Schoen (born 1953), American political analyst
- Ebbe Schön (1929–2022), Swedish writer
- Eduard Schön (1825–1879), Austrian composer
- Helmut Schön (1915–1996), German footballer
- Holger Schön (1910–1980), Swedish ski jumper
- Jan Hendrik Schön (born 1970), German physicist
- John W. Schoen (born 1952), American journalist
- Jonas Schön (born 1969), Swedish ice speed skater
- Kevin Schon (born 1958), American actor
- Margarete Schön (1895–1985), German actress
- Mila Schön (1917–2008), Italian fashion designer
- Nadine Schön (born 1983), German politician
- Nancy Schön (born 1928), American sculptor
- Neal Schon (born 1954), American musician
- Otto Schön (1905–1968), German politician
- Richard Schoen (born 1950), American mathematician
- Silvia Schön (born 1959), German politician
- Szabolcs Schön (born 2000), Hungarian footballer
- Theodor von Schön (1773–1856), Prussian politician
- Vic Schoen (1916–2000), American musician
- Wilhelm von Schoen (1851–1933), German diplomat

== See also ==
- Schön (disambiguation)
- Schoen
