= Sosnowiec Cathedral =

Coordinates: 50.2744°N 19.1317°E

Cathedral Basilica of the Assumption of the Blessed Virgin Mary
- Bazylika katedralna Wniebowzięcia Najświętszej Maryi Panny
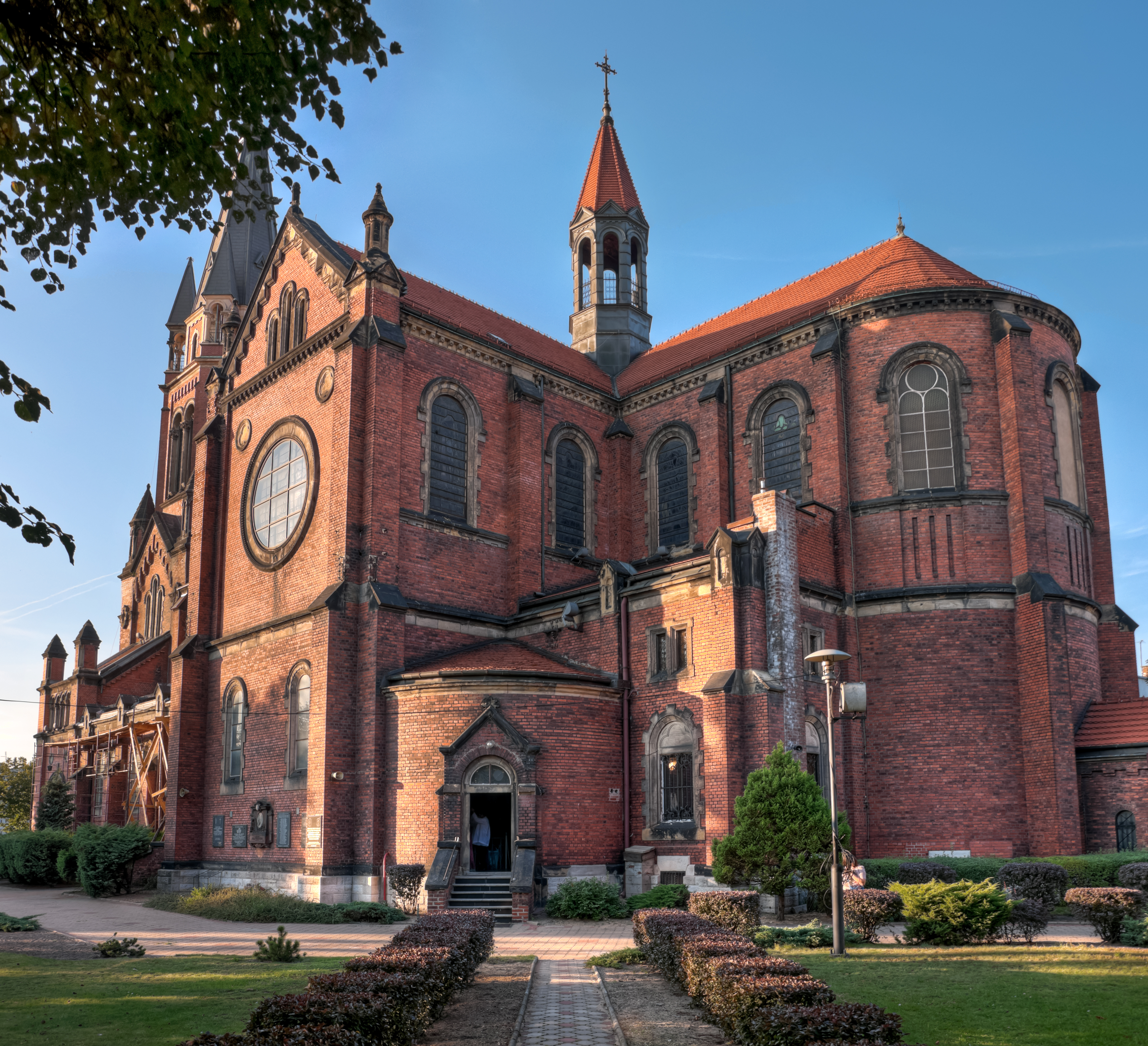
- Cathedral Basilica of the Assumption of the Blessed Virgin Mary
- Location: Sosnowiec
- Country: Poland
- Denomination: Roman Catholic Church

History
- Founded: 1899

The Cathedral Basilica of the Assumption of the Blessed Virgin Mary (Polish: Bazylika katedralna Wniebowzięcia Najświętszej Maryi Panny w Sosnowcu ) also called Sosnowiec Cathedral is a religious building affiliated with the Catholic Church which is located in the city of Sosnowiec in the European country of Poland.

It is eclectic church built in 1899, on the plan of a Latin cross basilica type. As of 25 March 1992 is the cathedral of the Diocese of Sosnowiec.

The most important Catholic shrine of Sosnowiec was built between 1893 and 1899. In 1896 there was put into operation for the faithful the lower chapel. In 1899 the Bishop of Kielce Tomasz Kulinski erected a new parish, freeing it from the area of the parish of Czeladź. In the year 1901 there was put into operation the rectory.

In October 2014 it was affected by a fire.

== See also ==
- Roman Catholicism in Poland
- Assumption Cathedral (disambiguation)

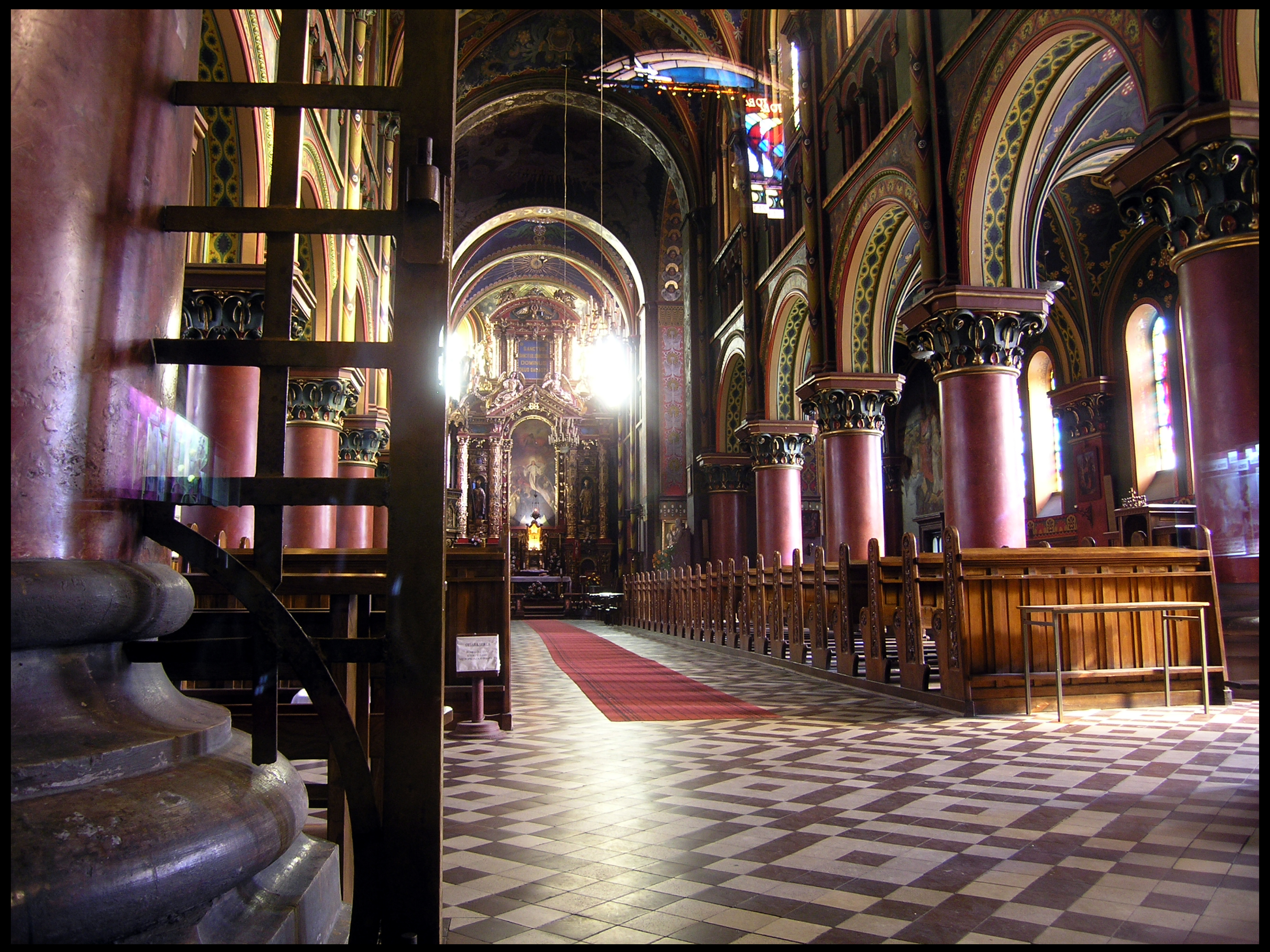
Internal view
