= Klimontów, Sosnowiec =

District of the city of Sosnowiec, Poland

Klimontów
- District of Sosnowiec
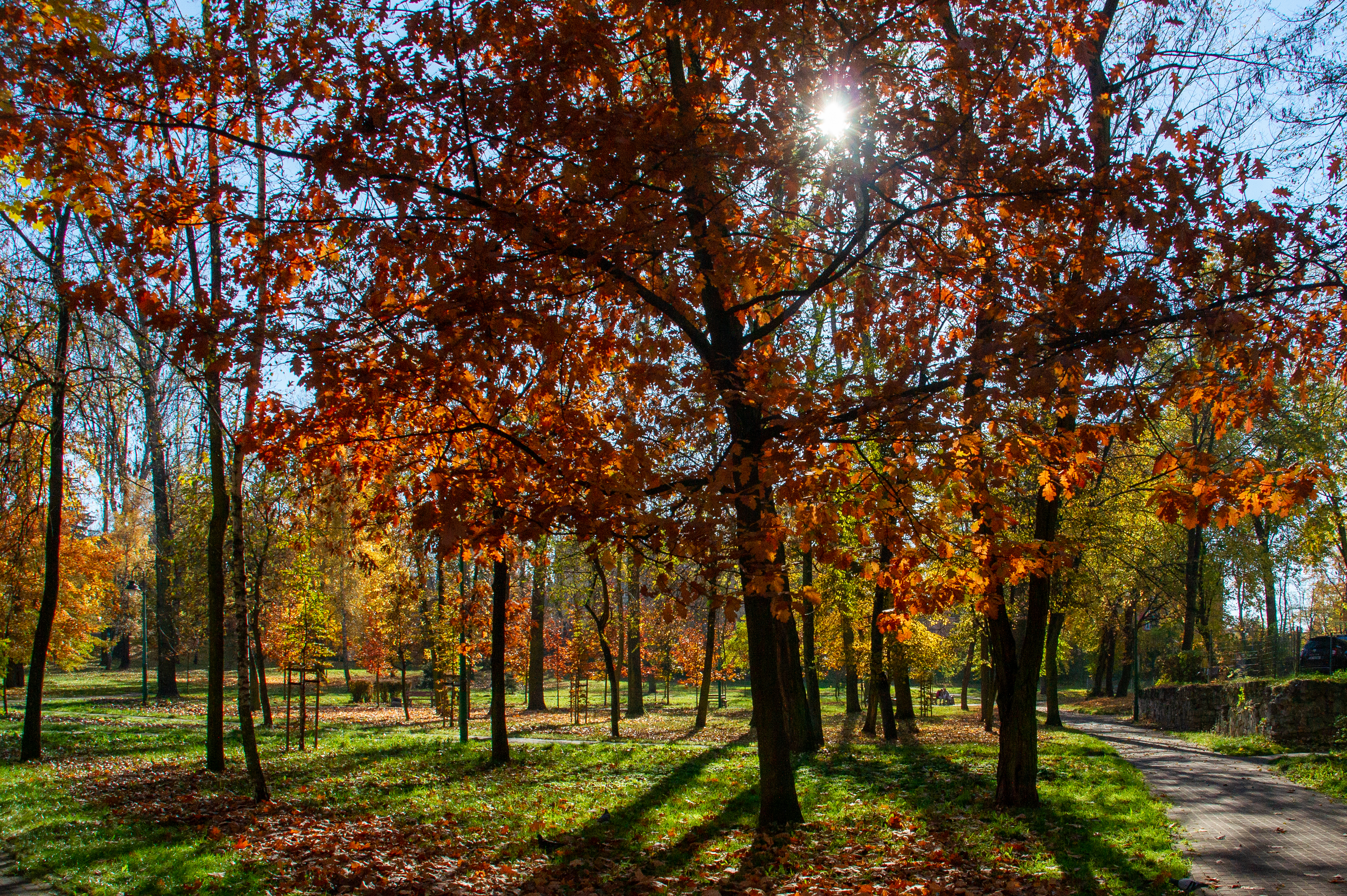
- Wanda Malczewska Park

- Location within Poland
- Coordinates: 50°16′33″N 19°11′41″E
- Country: Poland
- Voivodeship: Silesian
- County/City: Sosnowiec
- Time zone: UTC+1 (CET)
  - Summer (DST): UTC+2 (CEST)
- Vehicle registration: SO

Klimontów [kliˈmɔntuf] is a district of Sosnowiec in the Silesian Voivodeship of Poland, located in the central part of the city.

== History ==
Historical population
Year	Pop.
1827	216
1921	5,237

The Klimontów Coal Mine was built in 1908.

During the German invasion of Poland, which started World War II, in September 1939, the Germans carried out a massacre of nine Poles (eight men and one woman) in Klimontów (see Nazi crimes against the Polish nation). The German occupiers also established and operated two forced labour subcamps of the Stalag VIII-B/344 prisoner-of-war camp for Allied POWs in Klimontów.
