= Sielecki Castle =

Castle in Sosnowiec, Poland

- Zamek Sielecki
- Sosnowiec, Poland
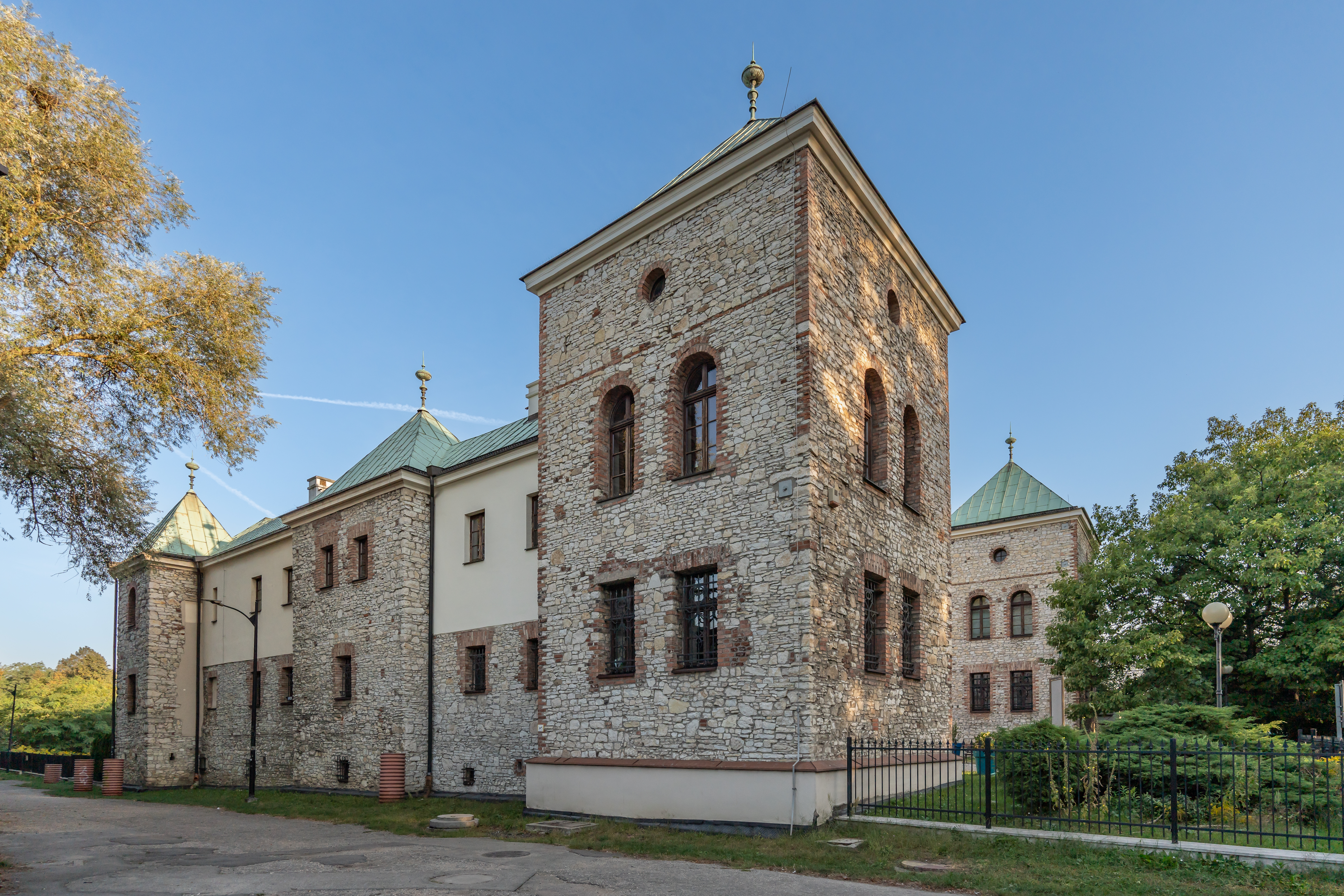

Site information
- Type: Castle
- Open to the public: yes

Location
- Coordinates: 50°17′07″N 19°09′44″W

Site history
- Materials: stone

Garrison information
- Occupants: Sosnowieckie Centrum Sztuki
- Designations: Listed in the Register of Monuments (Poland) under numbers A/15/60 (February 23, 1960) and A/921/2021 (December 9, 2021), covering the Sielecki Castle and Park Complex.

Sielecki Castle is a castle in the city of Sosnowiec in southern Poland, located in the Sielc district. The castle is located on the left bank of the Czarna Przemsza River. It was built in the 17th century and it is the oldest building in the city.

== Architecture ==
Originally a defensive fortification, expanded in 1620 into a four-wing complex with corner towers, perhaps using earlier buildings. The castle was built of broken limestone and brick. Storey building with basement. After the fire in 1824, the castle was rebuilt in 1832, but the east wing with the entrance gate was demolished and the moats were filled. Despite these changes, the original defensive character is evidenced by the shape of the block, four corner towers and projections on the extension of the side wings. It is currently a three-winged building with an open courtyard.

== History ==
The history of building the castle is not fully known. Until recently, it was believed that it was established in 1620, but thanks to archaeological research and queries in archives, it turned out that its origins date back to perhaps the 15th century. In 1620, Sebastian Minor of the Półkozic coat of arms completed the construction of a new castle on a quadrangle plan with a courtyard in the middle. This was commemorated with a plaque preserved until today in the chapel. The appearance of the castle from this period is presented in the inventories from 1665 and 1719. After Minory, the owners of Sielec were Modrzejewscy and Męgoborski. During the reign of King Stanisław August Poniatowski, the castle belonged to Colonel Michał Żuliński, and then to the chamberlain of the royal court of Jordan Stojewski, who in 1802 sold the castle to Prussian General Christian Ludwig Schimmelpfennig von der Oye. After his death in 1812, the widow in 1814 sold the castle to the prince of Pszczyna, Ludwik Anhalt-Coethen von Pless [1]. In 1824, the castle burned down, which meant that the prince commissioned its reconstruction based on plans prepared by Józef Heintz, on the basis of which the east wing was demolished and the moats were filled [5]. In 1856, the building was bought by metallurgy entrepreneur Andreas von Renard from Strzelce Opolskie and in the hands of this family and the company associated with it, the castle remained until the Second World War as an office building. In the past, it was not only the seat of nobles, but also of Gwarectwa count. Renard and then Mining Museum and Contemporary Glass Museum.

In 1994 the city of Sosnowiec took over the destroyed castle. Currently, the castle houses the "Sosnowiec Art Center - Sielecki Castle". This local government institution co-creates the cultural life of the city by organizing exhibitions, concerts and various culture-forming meetings.

== Calendar ==
- 1361 - Abraham from Goszyce with his son Marek sold the property in Sielec to the Sandomierz starost Otton from Pilcza, coat of arms Topór
- 1384 - Otton from Pilcza, coat of arms Topór dies
- 1403 - First information about a defensive object in Sielec
- 1430–1434 - a neighborly conflict between Bodzanta from Sielce of the Szeliga coat of arms and Mikołaj Siestrzeniec of the Kornic coat of arms, the famous adventurous burgrave of Będzin
- 1430 - mention of the existence of a fortalice
- 1465 - the royal courtier Jakub Duch from Dębno becomes the owner of the fortalice
- 1487 - idyllic goods as part of regaining the princesses were bought from Gregory of Morawica and became the property of King Kazimierz Jagiellończyk
- 1567 - Walenty Minor becomes the owner of Sielec
- 1620 - Sebastian Minor from Przybysławice, the coat of arms of Półkozic, heir to Sielec and Obichów, completes the construction of four stone wings at the castle with corner towers
- The end of the 18th century - the castle belongs to Colonel Michał Żulinski, and then to the chamberlain of the court of the Polish king Jordan Stojewski
- 1824 - castle fire
- 1832 - reconstruction of the castle after a fire
- 1856 - Count Andrzej Renard and the castle were bought together with the castle by son Andrzej. Reconstruction of the castle: destruction of the eastern wing, backfilling of moats.
- 1884 - the castle houses the headquarters of the Renard family mining company
- 1977 - the castle became the property of the "Vitropol" Economic Glass Works and was designated as the seat of the Museum and the Central Polish Glass Pattern Shop
- 1977 - 1980 general renovation of the castle
- 1981 - 1995 - seat of the Contemporary Glass Museum
- 1994 - the destroyed castle took over the city, renovation began
- 1999–2002 - renovation of the castle and giving it its current appearance
- 2002 - the Sosnowiec Art Center-Sielecki Castle begins its activity in the castle
