= Szwedzki =

Street artist from Poland

Szwedzki 0700 Team
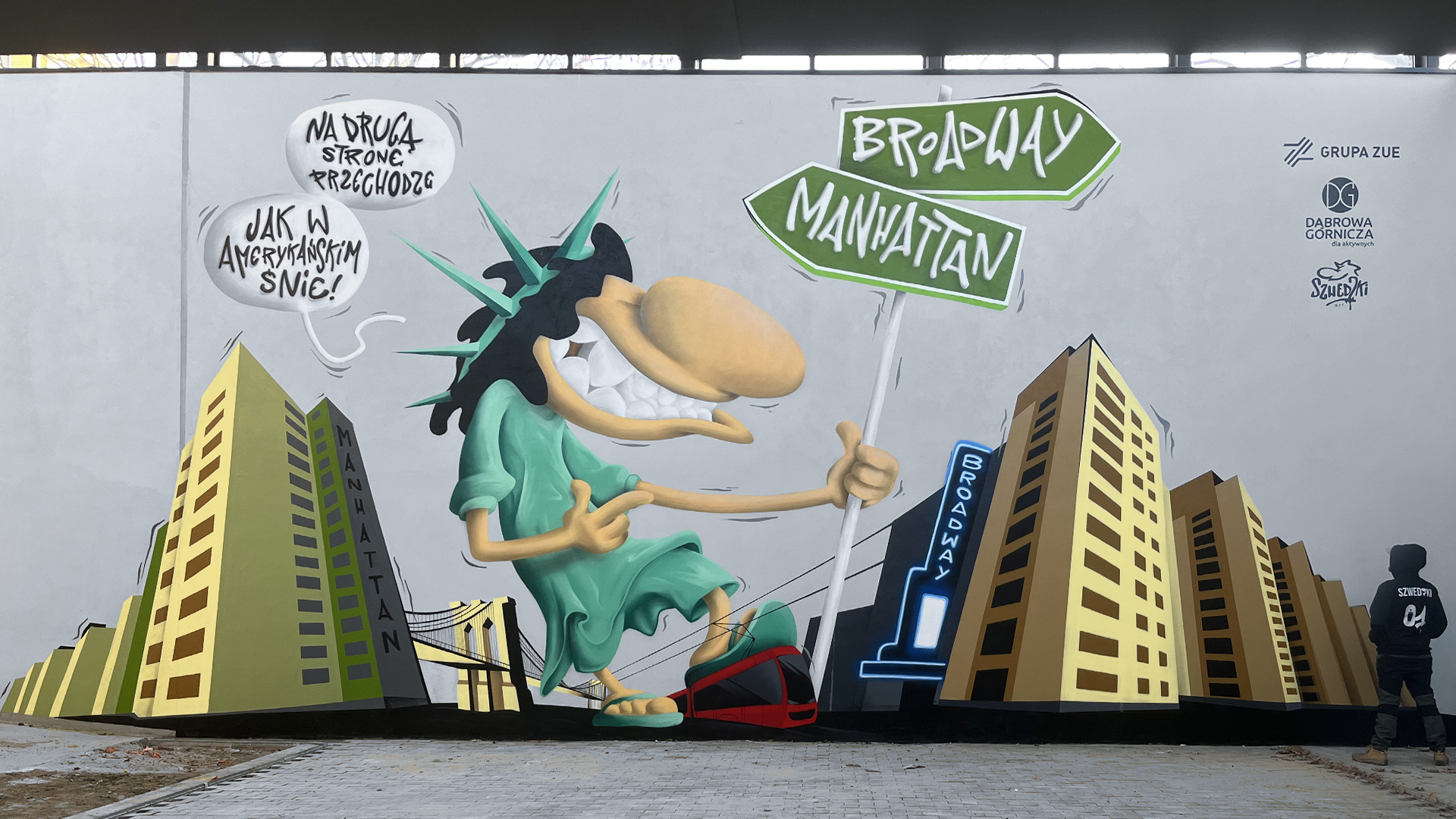
- Szwedzki standing in front of their mural in Dąbrowa Górnicza, 2023
- Born: Latter 20th century Sweden
- Years active: 2000-present
- Style: Street art characters
- Movement: Graffiti
- Website: szwedzki.art

Szwedzki is the tag of a street artist active mainly in the Silesian Voivodeship, creator of murals and graffiti. It is also the name of the character in his typically humorous murals, depicting the same comic-style figure in blue pants and a yellow shirt.

Szwedzki is an immigrant from Sweden living in Sosnowiec. He painted his first murals in 2000. In the early years, his work was sometimes described as vandalism, but in later years, with the growing popularity of street art in Poland, it became accepted as a form of regional art. The artist's goal is to entertain viewers. Szwedzki's later murals often include a humorous comment in the form of a comic-style speech bubble.

In 2013, the character was described in the Katowice supplement of Gazeta Wyborcza as known to everyone. In 2014, a rally called Following Szwedzki's Trail was held in Dąbrowa Górnicza. In 2015, the artist was described by Dziennik Zachodni as the Silesian Banksy, and his murals were recognized as the most distinctive regional murals in Poland. In 2019, Dziennik Zachodni called him one of the most recognizable street artists in Silesia.

In 2022, he created, among others, a satirical mural about Russian President Vladimir Putin.
