= Marcin Drzymont =

Polish footballer

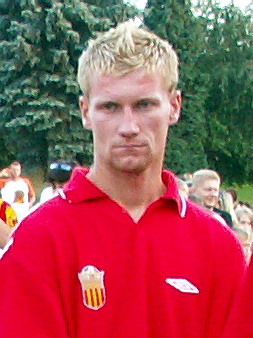
- Drzymont with Korona Kielce in 2006

Personal information
- Full name: Marcin Drzymont
- Date of birth: 16 September 1981 (age 45)
- Place of birth: Sosnowiec, Poland
- Height: 1.88 m (6 ft 2 in)
- Position: Defender

Senior career*
| Years | Team | Apps | (Gls) |
| 1998–2004 | Zagłębie Sosnowiec | | |
| 2005–2006 | Odra Wodzisław | 27 | (1) |
| 2006–2008 | Korona Kielce | 37 | (0) |
| 2006–2007 | → Lech Poznań (loan) | 19 | (0) |
| 2008–2011 | GKS Bełchatów | 47 | (2) |
| 2012 | Zawisza Bydgoszcz | 9 | (0) |
| 2012–2014 | Skra Częstochowa | 55 | (2) |
| 2014–2017 | Soła Oświęcim | 98 | (7) |
| 2018–2020 | Warta Zawiercie | 48 | (5) |
| 2020–2021 | Szczakowianka Jaworzno | 29 | (2) |
- * Club domestic league appearances and goals

Marcin Drzymont (born 16 September 1981) is a Polish former professional footballer who played as a defender.

== Honours ==
Skra Częstochowa

- III liga Opole–Silesia (North): 2013–14
