= Church of St. Thomas in Sosnowiec =

Coordinates: 50.2898°N 19.1335°E

Church of St. Thomas the Apostle
- Church of St. Thomas the Apostle in Sosnowiec
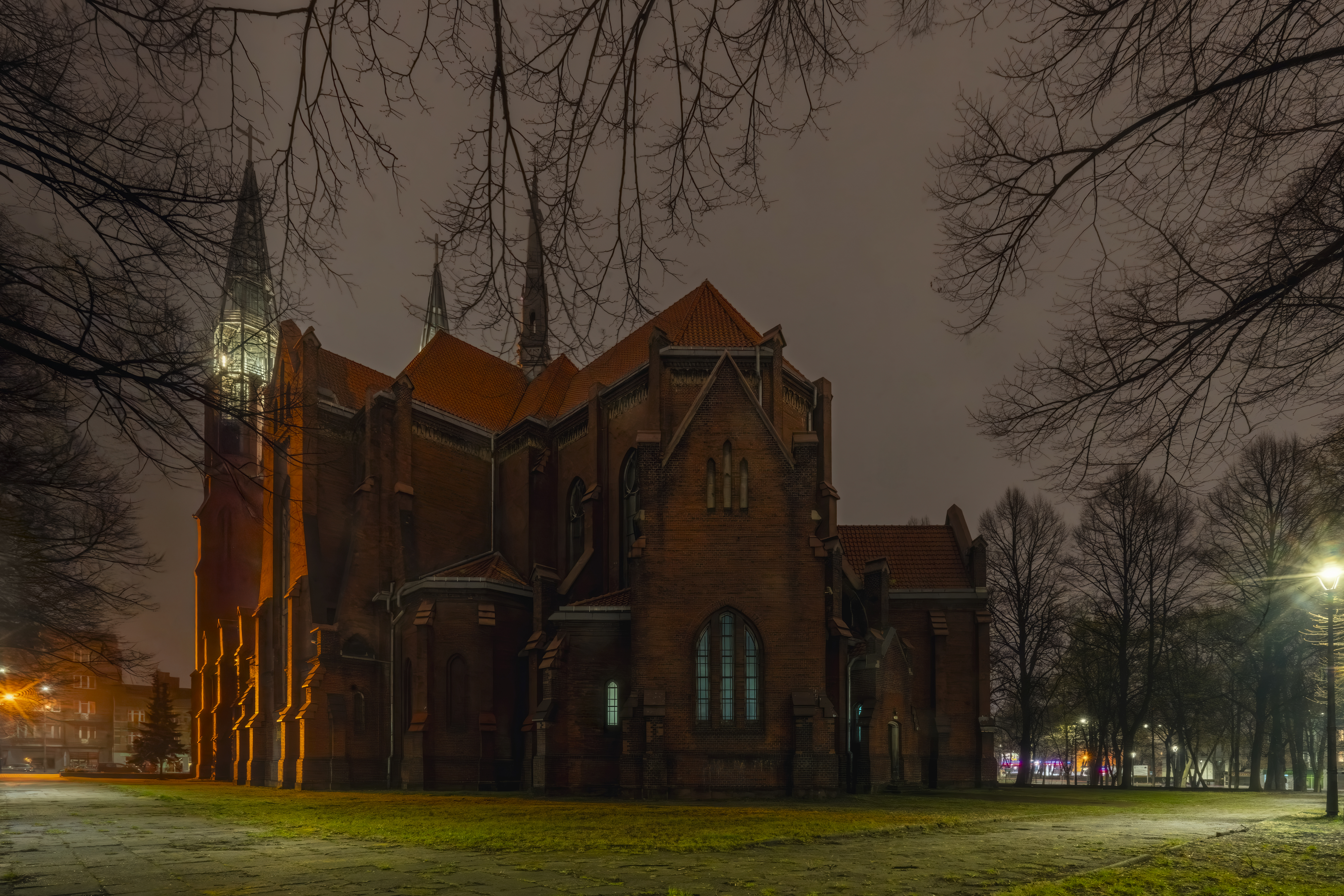
- St. Thomas the Apostle Church in Sosnowiec rear view at night
- Church of St. Thomas the Apostle
- Location: Sosnowiec
- Country: Poland
- Denomination: Roman Catholic Church

History
- Consecrated: 1911

Architecture
- Architect: Józef Pomian-Pomianowski
- Style: Gothic Revival architecture
- Years built: 1904 - 1911

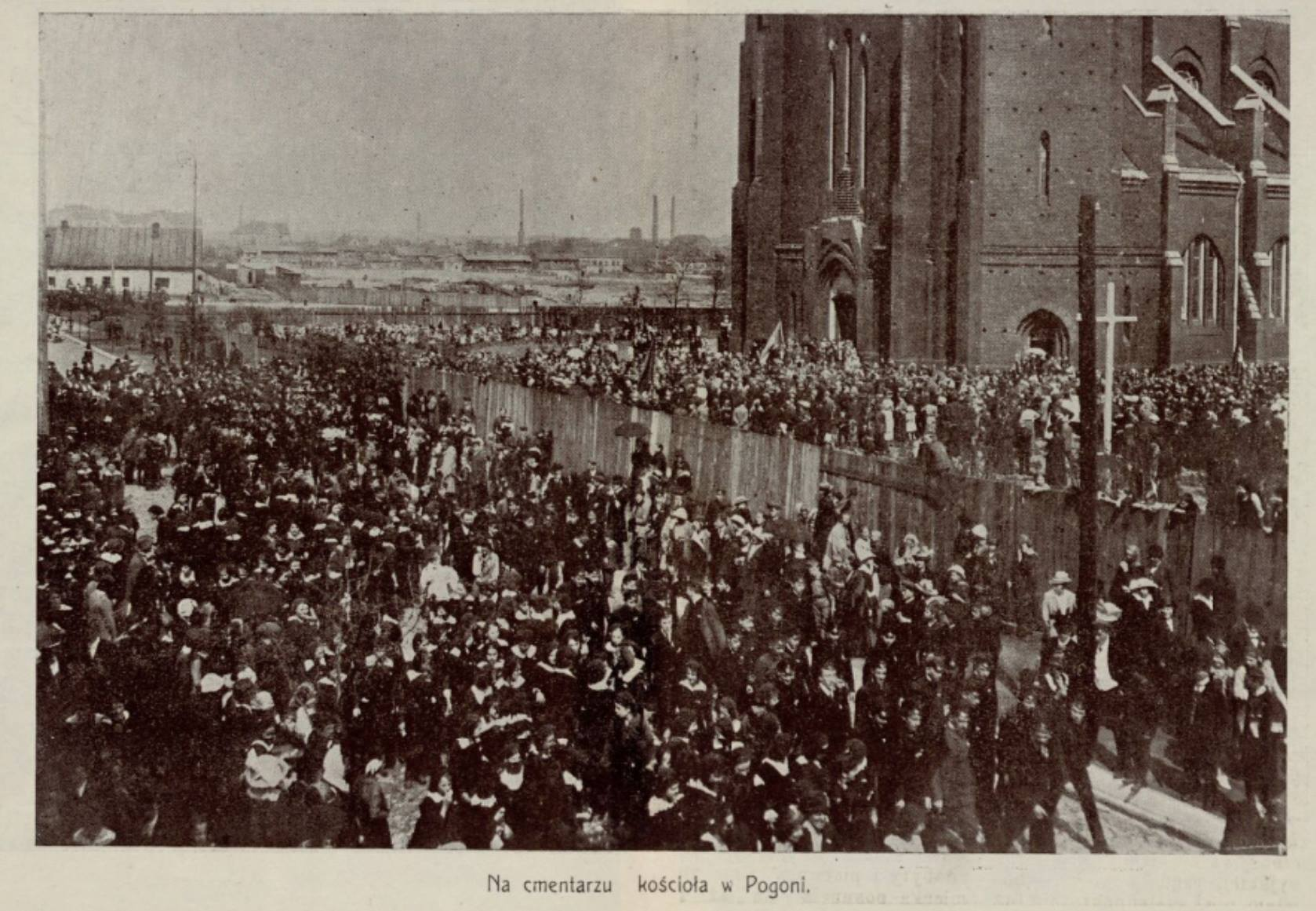

The Church of Saint Thomas the Apostle in Sosnowiec is a Roman Catholic parish church in Sosnowiec, Poland. It belongs to the deanery of St. Thomas the Apostle. It is located at Orla Street, in the Pogoń district.

The temple was built in the years 1904-1911 in the gothic revival style according to the design of the architect Józef Pomian-Pomianowski. It is a brick building, built on a Latin cross plan with an extensive presbytery. It is a building with three naves, basilica type. The body of the temple is varied, there are two contemporary openwork towers next to the façade, because in the years 2004–2007 they were added thanks to the efforts of the parish priest, Fr. Jan Szkoc, designed by Ewa and Tomasz Taczewski.

The furnishings of the temple were built in stages, but neo-Gothic elements dominate. The interior was enriched by a wooden, carved main altar with the features of the Art Deco style, located at the intersection of the nave and the transept.
