= Ernst Schön Palace (Sosnowiec) =

Palace in Środula, Sosnowiec, Poland

Ernst Schöen Palace in Sosnowiec
- Pałac Ernsta Schöna w Sosnowcu Środuli
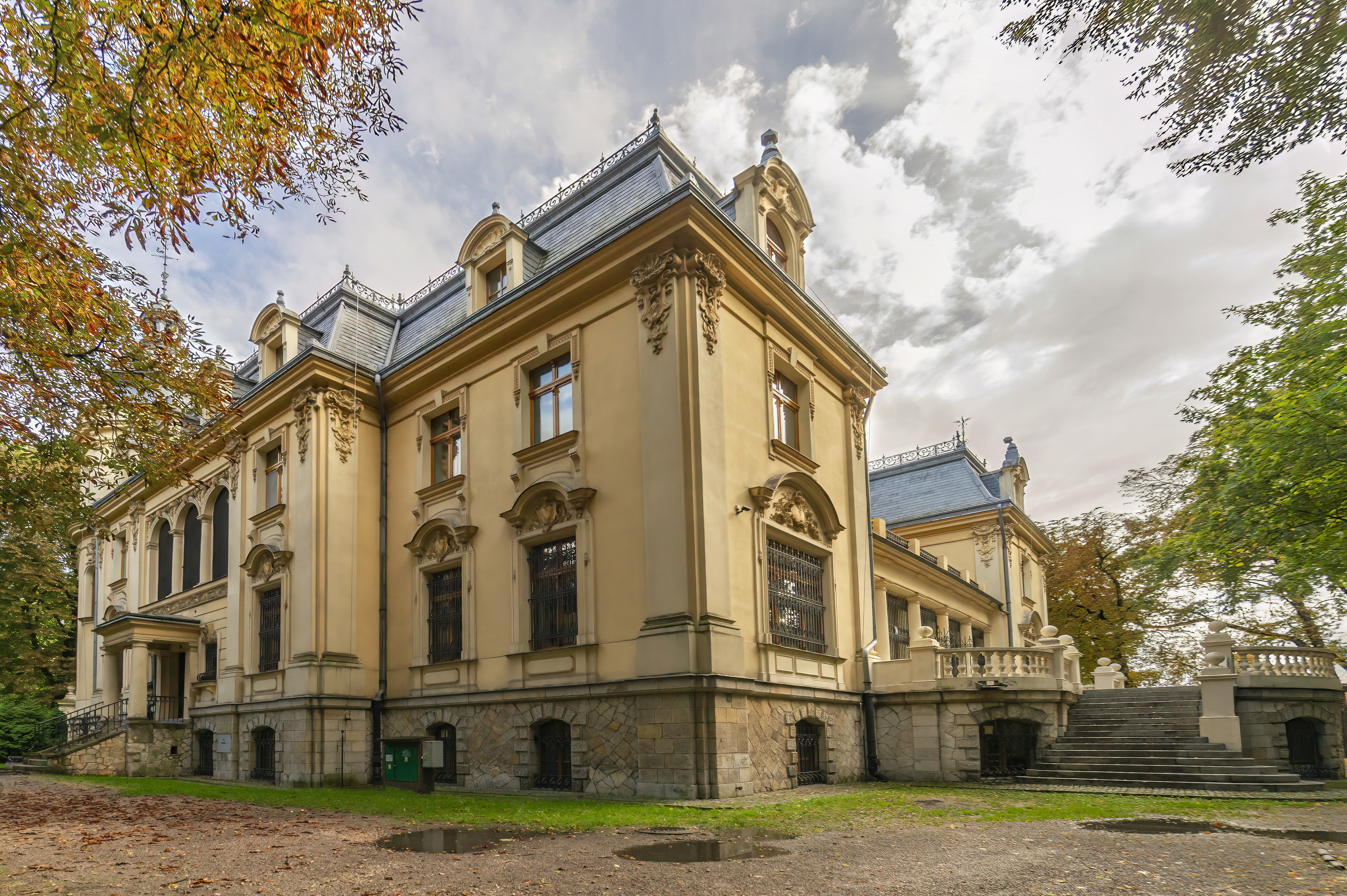
- The view from the garden; The north-west side;

- Location within Poland

General information
- Type: Palace
- Architectural style: Baroque Revival architecture
- Location: Sosnowiec, Poland, Poland
- Coordinates: 50°17′57.77″N 19°8′36.2″E
- Completed: 1885

Technical details
- Floor count: 4

Ernst Schön Palace is a palace located in Sosnowiec in southern Poland. The building is located near the Warsaw–Vienna railway and surrounded by a neo-Romantic park (the Schön Park). Since 1985 it has housed the Museum in Sosnowiec. Wilhelm Schön Palace is located nearby.

It is one of the two palaces of the Schön family in Sosnowiec; the other being the Franz Schön Palace.

== History ==
The neo-Baroque structure was constructed by Ernst Schön at the end of the 19th century. It was altered several times. The biggest changes were carried out after the Second World War when used to house a kindergarten and private flats. In 1980 the Schön Palace was registered as one of the monuments of Katowice province, when its conversion into a museum began. In the spring of 1985 the Museum, at that time a department of the Upper Silesian Museum in Bytom, opened to the public. In 1990 it was taken over by Sosnowiec. The year 2005 was its 20th anniversary. During this time, exhibitions and cultural events, concerts, conferences and competitions for youth have taken place.
