= Schoen =

Schoen is a common surname of German origin. People with the surname include:

- Alan Schoen (1924–2023), American physicist
- Christian Schoen, German art historian
- Craig Schoen (born 1983), American basketball player
- Cristie Schoen (1976–2015), Spanish-born American chef
- Dan Schoen (born 1974), American politician
- David Schoen, American lawyer
- Douglas Schoen, American political commentator
- Edgar Schoen (1925–2016), American physician
- Gaili Schoen, American musician
- Gerry Schoen (1947–2021), American baseball player
- Harold Schoen, American mathematics professor
- Herbert Schoen (1929–2014), German footballer
- Joe Schoen (born 1979), American sports executive
- John W. Schoen, American journalist
- Karl John Schoen (1894–1918), American aviator, war hero
- Lawrence M. Schoen, American author and psychologist
- Max Schoen (1888–1959), American music educator
- Richard Schoen (born 1950), American mathematician
- Seth Schoen, American computer authority
- Thomas Schoen, Abbot of Bornem Abbey
- Tom Schoen (1946–2023), American football player
- Vic Schoen (1916–2000), American musician
- Wilhelm von Schoen (1851–1933), German diplomat

== See also ==
- Schön (surname)
