= Sosnowiec =

- City county
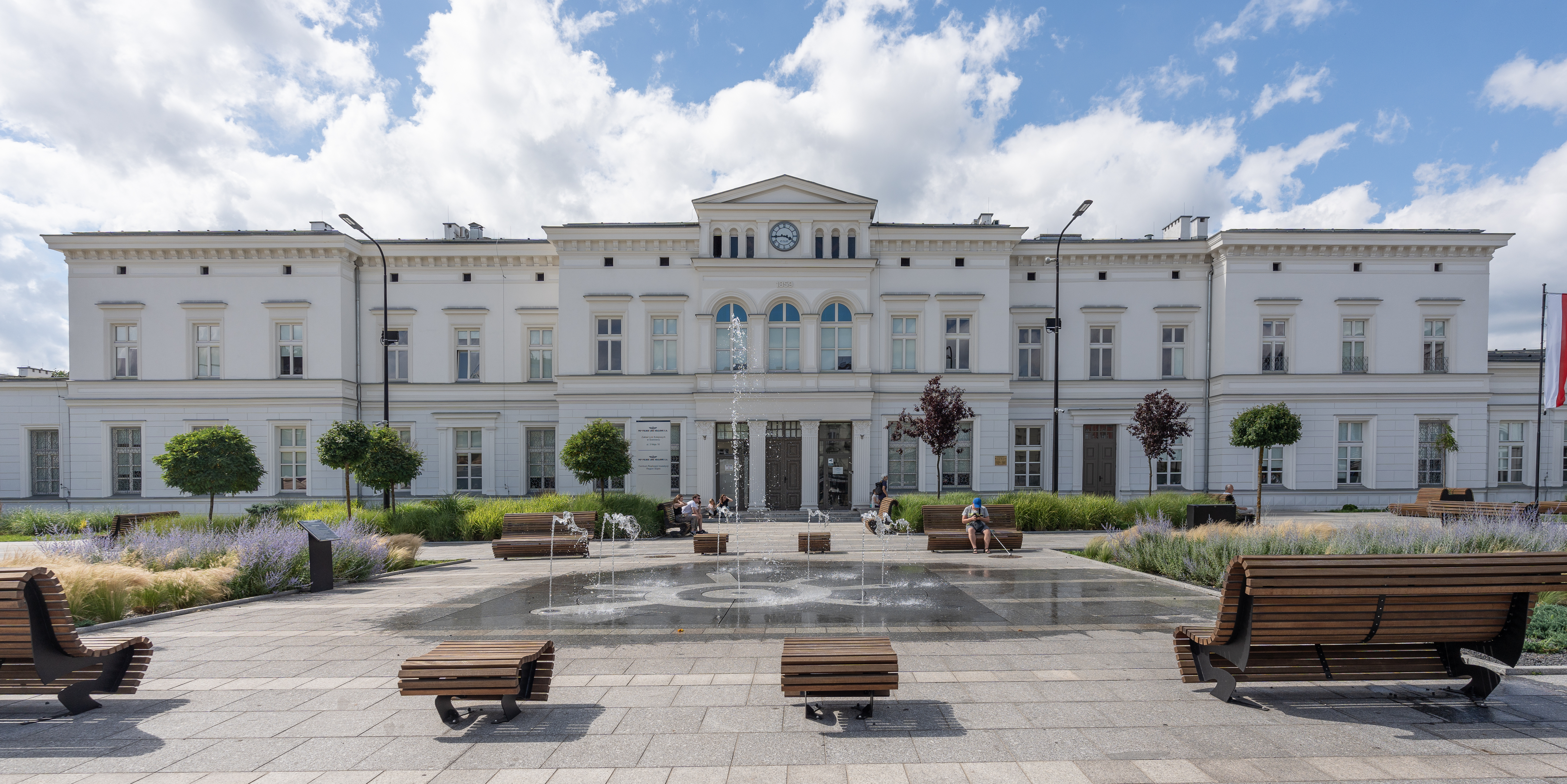
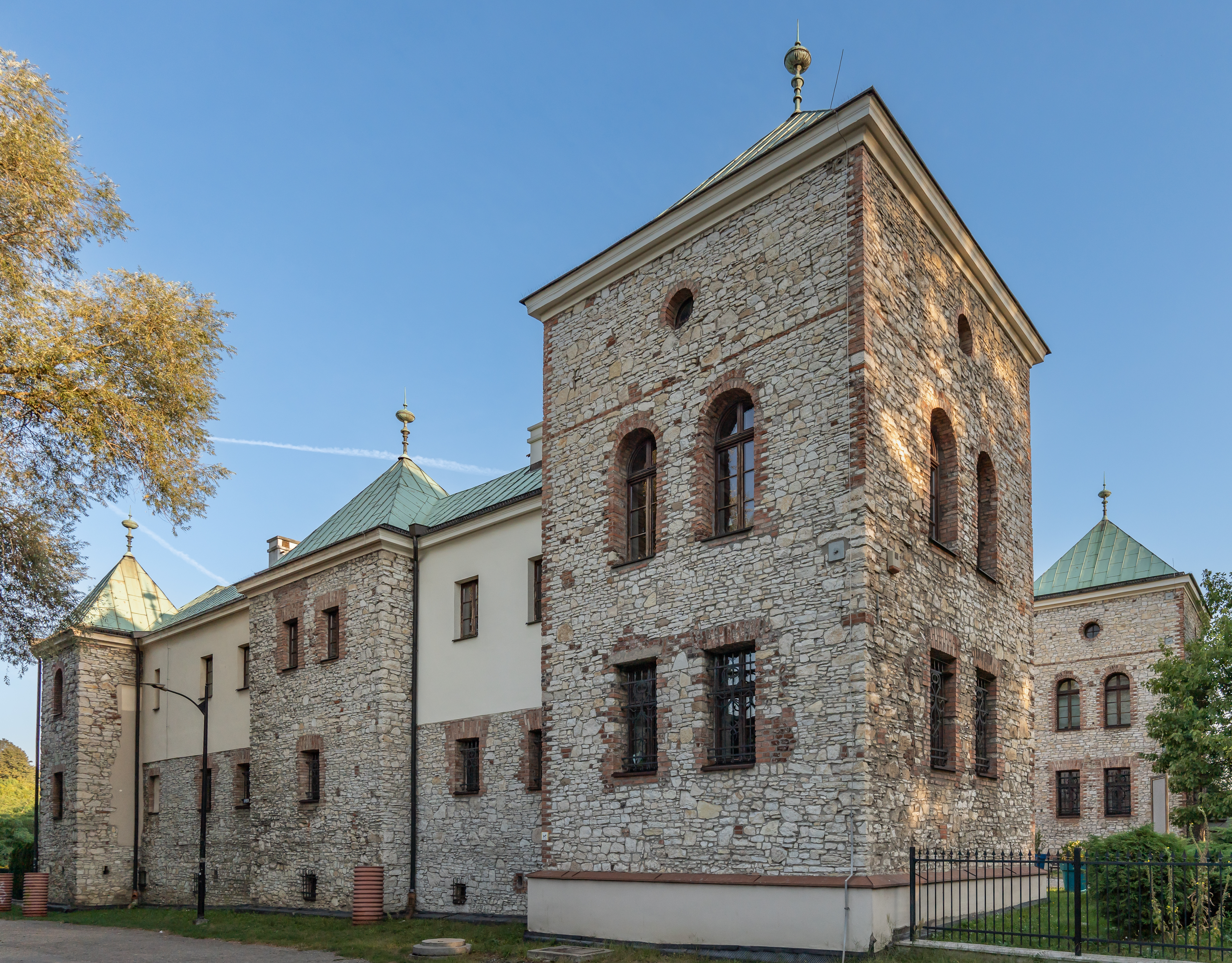
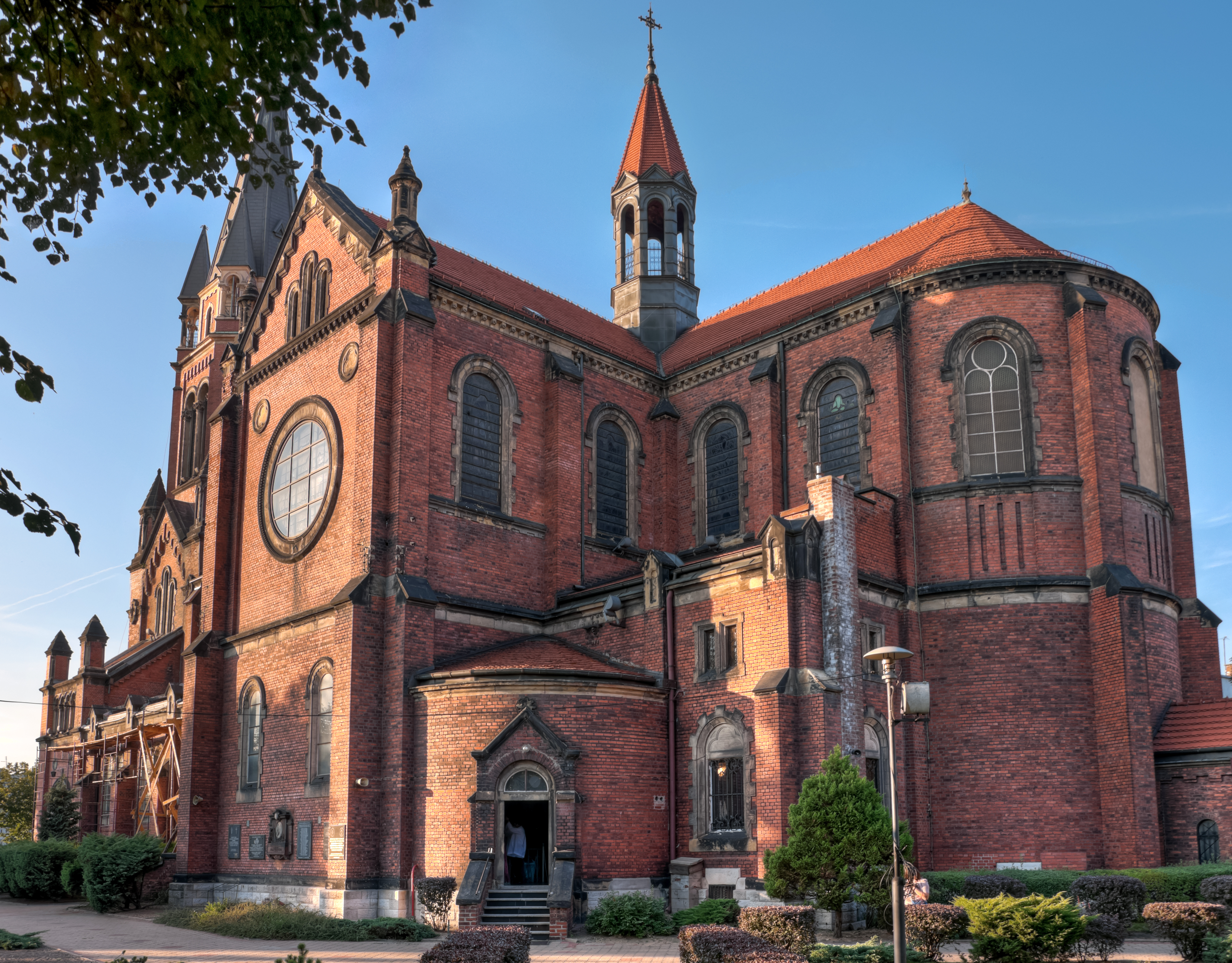
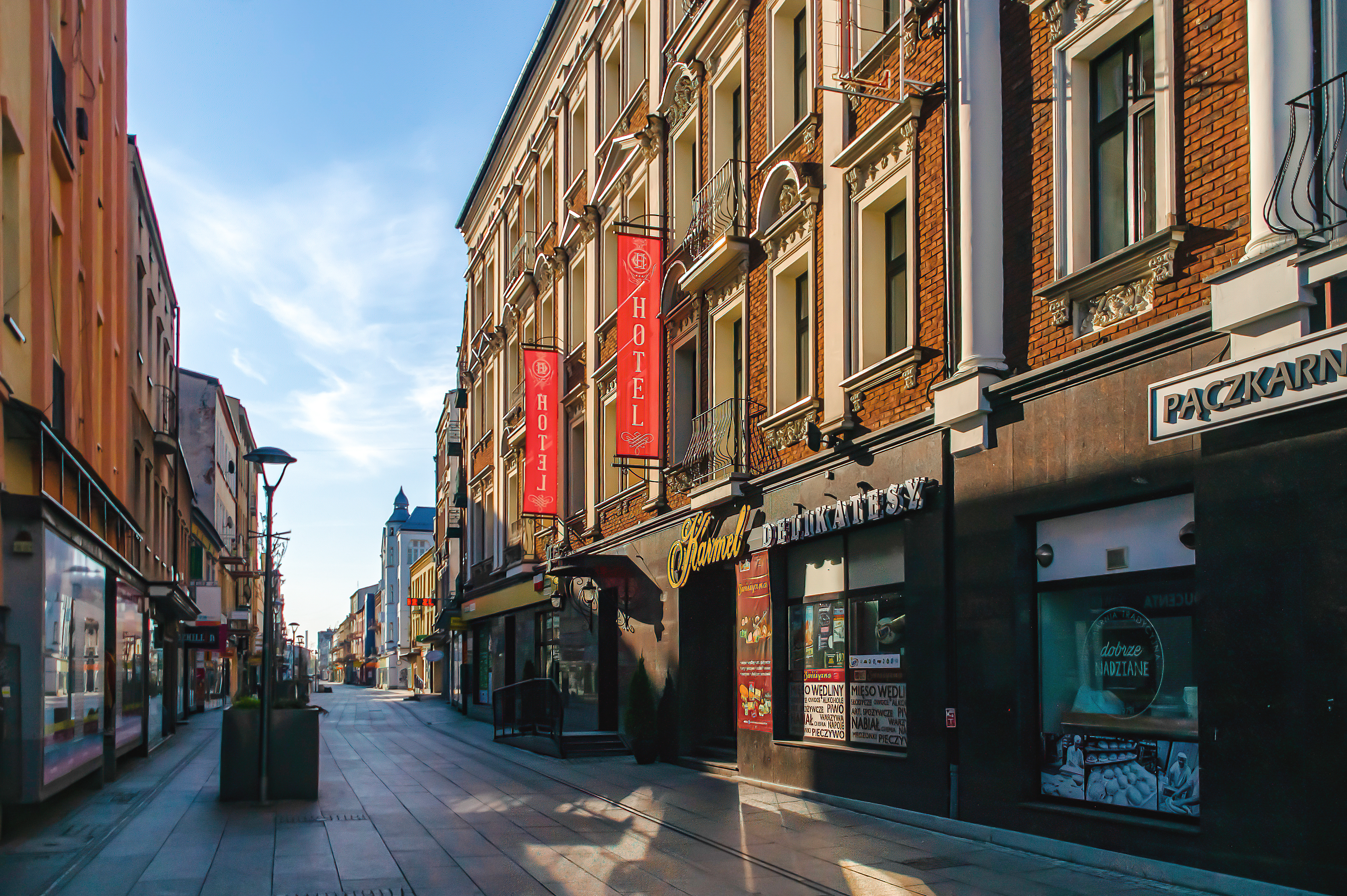
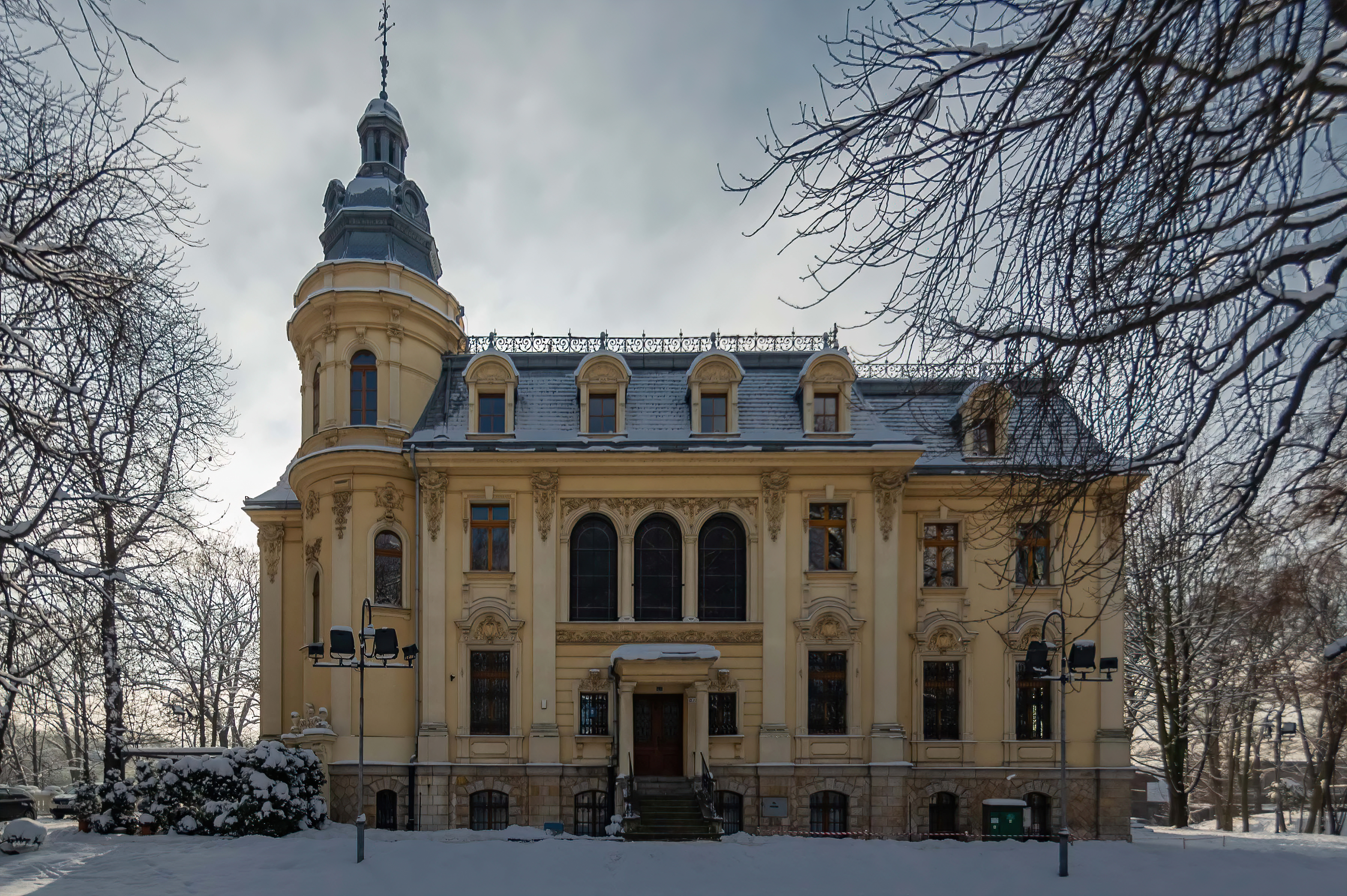
- Main railway station Sielecki Castle Sosnowiec Cathedral Modrzejowska Street Old Schön Palace

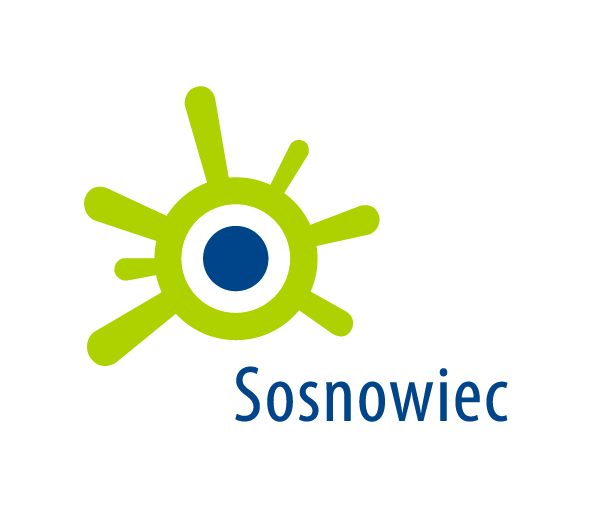
- Flag Coat of arms Brandmark
- Interactive map of Sosnowiec
- Location within Poland
- Coordinates: 50°17′N 19°08′E
- Country: Poland
- Voivodeship: Silesian
- County: city county
- City rights: 1902

Government
  - City mayor: Arkadiusz Chęciński (KO)

Area
  - City county: 90.16 km^{2} (34.81 sq mi)
- Elevation: 250 m (820 ft)

Population (31 December 2022)
  - City county: 189,178 ▼ (17th)
  - Density: 2,075/km^{2} (5,370/sq mi)
  - Urban: 2,746,000
  - Metro: 4,620,624
- Demonym(s): sosnowiczanin (male) sosnowiczanka (female) (pl)
- Time zone: UTC+1 (CET)
  - Summer (DST): UTC+2 (CEST)
- Postal code: 41-200 to 41-225
- Area code: +48 32
- Car plates: SO
- Primary airport: Katowice Airport
- Website: www.sosnowiec.pl

Sosnowiec (Note: Pronunciation: UK: /sɒsˈnɒvjɛts/; US: /-ˈnɔːv-, -ˈnoʊv-/; Polish: [sɔsˈnɔvjɛts] '; German: Sosnowice, Sosnowitz) is an industrial city county in the Dąbrowa Basin of southern Poland, in the Silesian Voivodeship, which is also part of the Metropolis GZM municipal association. Located in the eastern part of the Upper Silesian Industrial Region, Sosnowiec is one of the cities of the Katowice urban area, which is a conurbation with a total population of 2.7 million people; as well as the greater Katowice-Ostrava metropolitan area populated by about 5.3 million people. The population of the city is 189,178 as of December 2022.

== Geography ==
Sosnowiec within the Metropolis GZM

It is believed that the name Sosnowiec originates from the Polish word sosna, referring to the pine forests growing in the area prior to 1830. The village was originally known as Sosnowice. Other variations of the name include Sosnowietz, Sosnowitz, Sosnovitz (Yiddish), Sosnovyts, Sosnowyts, Sosnovytz, Sosnowytz, and Sosnovetz. There are five other smaller settlements in Poland also called Sosnowiec, located in the Kielce Voivodship, Łódź Voivodship, and Opole Voivodship.

Sosnowiec serves as one of the administrative centres of the geographical and historical area of southern Poland known as the Zagłębie Dąbrowskie (the Dąbrowa Basin). It lies within the historic Lesser Poland region near the border with Silesia. It is situated in the Silesian Upland on the rivers Brynica and Przemsza, a tributary of the Vistula. The full list of rivers includes Biała Przemsza as well as Czarna Przemsza, Brynica, Bobrek, and Potok Zagórski creek. The city is part of the Silesian Voivodeship since its formation in 1999. Previously (since 1945), it was part of Katowice Voivodeship, and before World War II, Sosnowiec belonged to Kielce Voivodeship.

== History ==
=== Early history ===
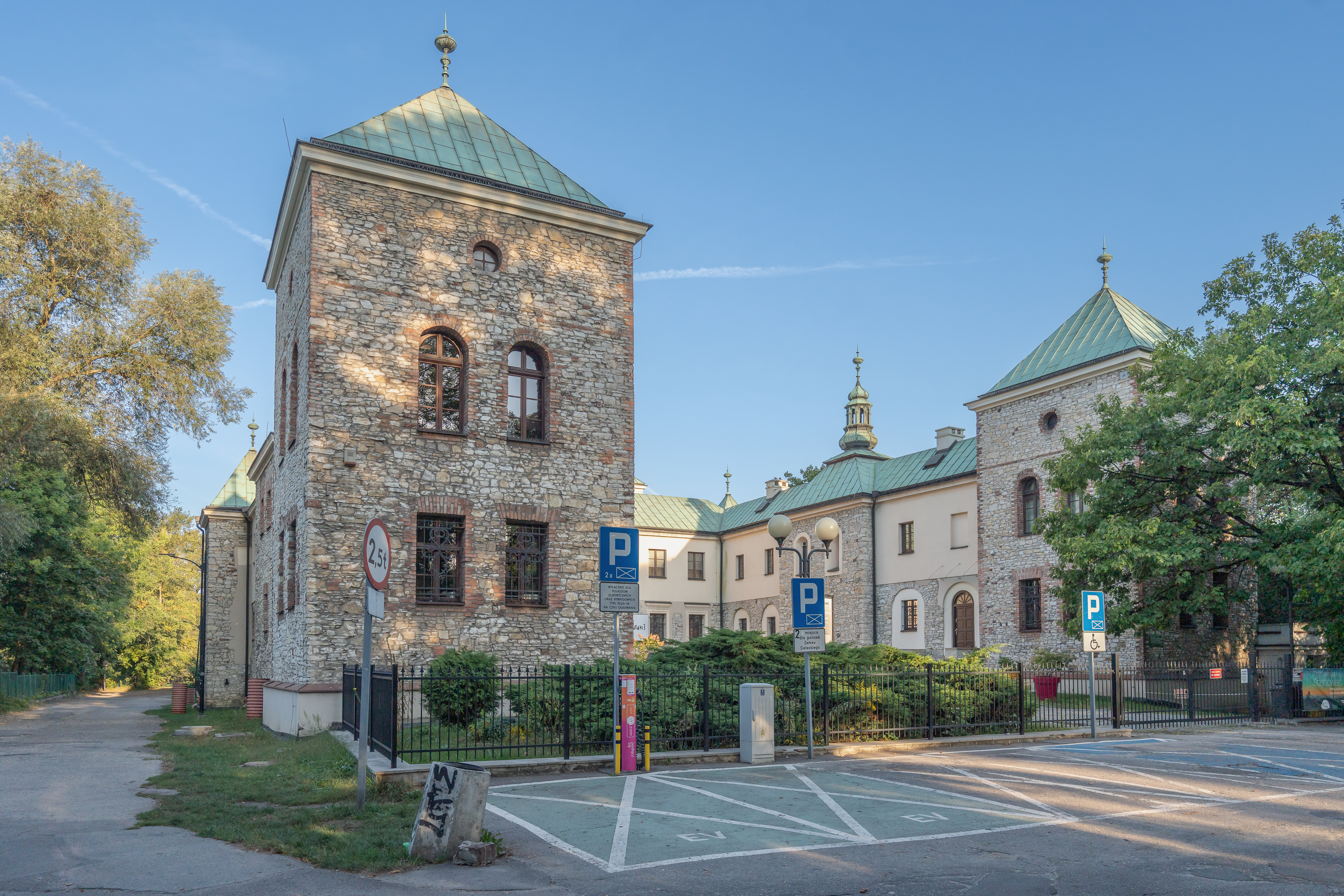
Medieval Sielecki Castle in the Sielec district

The history of the city begins in 1902 when it was granted city rights after the merger a number of older settlements. However, the history of the village of Sosnowiec dates back to the year 1227, when it was mentioned for the first time. It was a small settlement in the Polish Duchy of Kraków, located in close vicinity of much larger and better-developed villages of Sielce and Zagórze (both are now districts of the city). Other districts are even older. Milowice was first mentioned in 1123 as Miley. Documents from 1228 already mention Milowice, Klimontów, and Zagórze. Furthermore, Milowice was placed on a 1561 map.

As part of the Polish–Lithuanian Commonwealth, Sosnowiec belonged to Kraków Voivodeship in the larger Lesser Poland Province. It became a border town after the neighbouring Duchies of Silesia passed to the Bohemian Crown in 1335. In the result of the third partition of Poland in 1795, however, it was seized by the Kingdom of Prussia and was included into the newly established province of New Silesia. During the Napoleonic Wars, it became part of the Duchy of Warsaw in 1807 and later, of Congress Poland ruled by the namiestniks of the Russian Empire. Located at the borders with the German Empire and Austria-Hungary, Sosnowiec became famous for the Three Emperors' Corner tripoint, which was located within current limits of the city. During the January Uprising, in February 1863, the Battle of Sosnowiec was fought, in which Polish insurgents led by Apolinary Kurowski defeated the Russians. The victory allowed the Poles to take control of the surrounding towns as well.

=== City rights ===
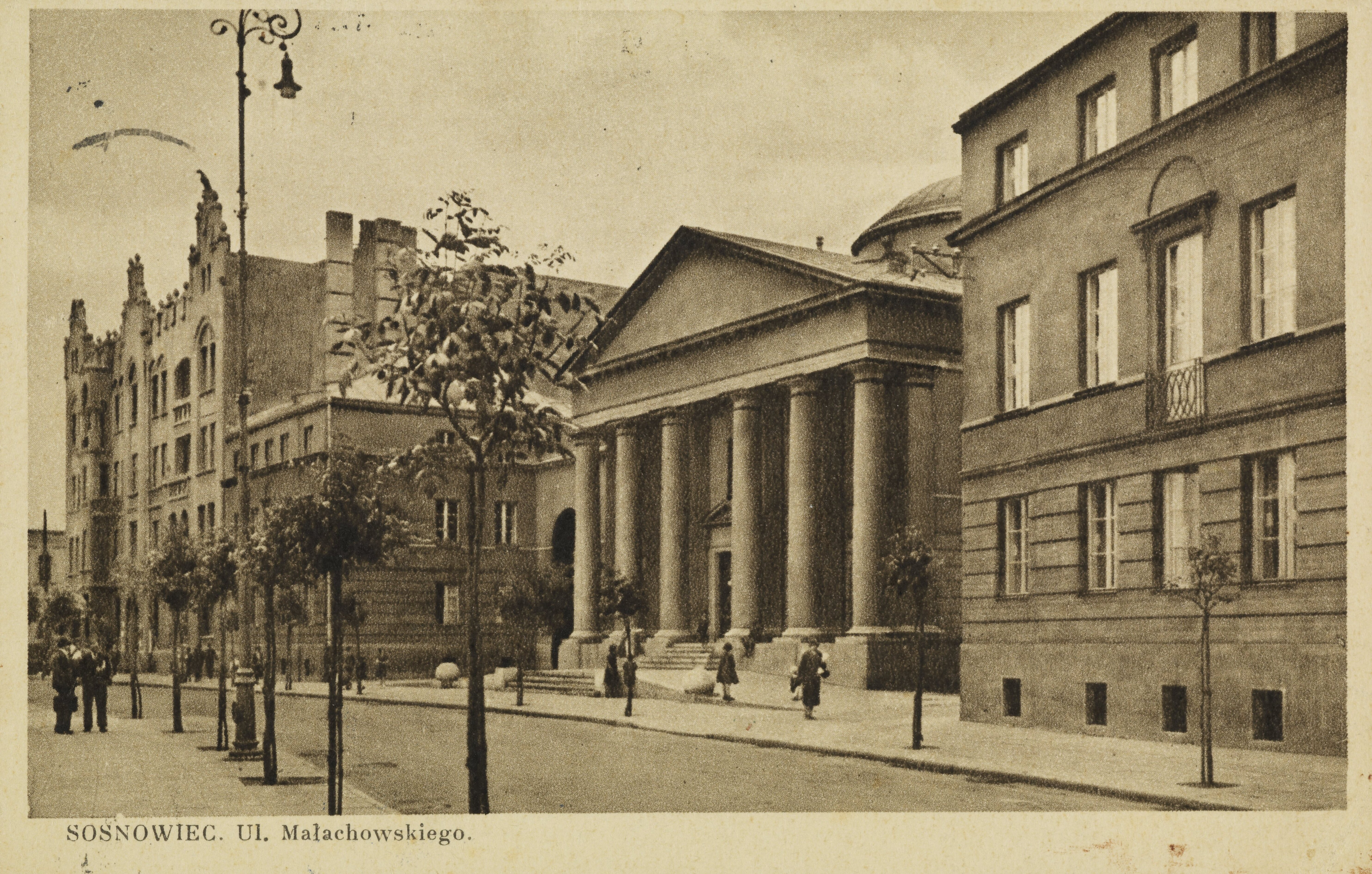
Sosnowiec in the 1930s

With effect from 10 June 1902, by the order of Emperor Nicholas II of Russia, Sosnowiec was legally named a city with the area of 19 square kilometres (7 sq mi) and with 60,000 inhabitants. Obtaining the city rights helped the economic and cultural development of the town. Apart from steelworks and coal-mines and many enterprises of heavy and light industry, new cultural and social establishments were opened as well. The newly established town consisted of the districts of Sosnowiec, Pogoń, Ostra Górka, Sielec, Kuźnica and Radocha, all of which had been separate villages before. The very fact that Russian authorities waited for so long to grant Sosnowiec town rights is seen as a punishment for local support for the Polish January Uprising 1863/64, after which numerous towns had seen their status, and were reduced to a village status. Sosnowiec was the first post-1860s location in Congress Poland to have received town charter, the second being Puławy in 1906.

Natural resources and a good geographical location had an important influence on the development of Sosnowiec. The opening of a branch line of the Warsaw-Vienna Railway in 1859 was vitally important for the growth of the town. Development of industry with the new factory of rope and wire, rolling mill, steelworks, iron foundry, steam boilers factory, and later spinning mill, dye-house and paper mill sealed the new image of the town as entirely urban. The Summer Theatre and, in 1887, the Winter Theatre were founded, the second of which was called City Theatre from 1924 in independent Poland, and later the Theatre of Zagłębie. In 1915, the village of Środula was incorporated into Sosnowiec.

Poland finally regained independence in 1918, after World War I. In the Second Polish Republic, Sosnowiec became part of the Kielce Voivodeship, and in 1934 the City County of Sosnowiec was established. Sosnowiec suffered war damages during both major military conflicts in the 20th century: World War I, which caused mainly destruction to industry, and World War II, which brought about the terror of executions.

=== World War II ===
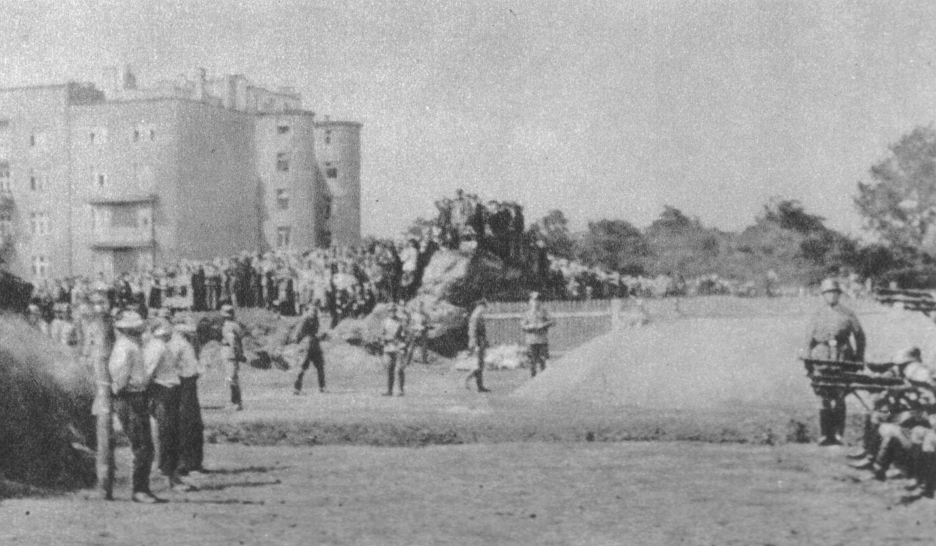
Public execution of Poles in 1939 by the Germans during World War II

After the 1939 Invasion of Poland, which started World War II, the city was occupied by Nazi Germany and renamed Sosnowitz. On 4 September 1939, German troops murdered 10 Poles, including 15-year-old boy Henryk Słomka, in Sosnowiec in revenge for Polish defense. Around the same time, the Germans murdered nine Poles in nearby Klimontów (present-day district of Sosnowiec). The Einsatzgruppe zbV entered the city on 12 September 1939. The German police carried out mass searches of Polish houses. Initially under military administration set up as part of the General Government, Sosnowiec was annexed by Germany and incorporated into the Province of Silesia on 20 November 1939. In March 1940, the Germans established a transit camp (Gefangenensammellager) for arrested Poles in Sosnowiec. At the turn of April and May 1940, the largest wave of arrests of Poles took place; they were first imprisoned in Radocha and then deported to the Dachau and Auschwitz concentration camps. The prison camp in Radocha served to exterminate the Polish population similarly to the notorious prisons and camps in Kraków, Poznań, Łódź, Warsaw, and Działdowo. Inhabitants of Sosnowiec were also among Poles murdered in Celiny in June 1940. The German occupying administration operated three labour subcamps of the Stalag VIII-B/344 prisoner-of-war camp in the city, and two more in the present-day district of Klimontów.

The Polish underground resistance movement was active in the city. Sosnowiec was one of three cities in the Polish territories annexed by Germany where the Polish Red Cross was able to operate, focusing mainly on supplying medicines and food to prisoners, including those at the Auschwitz concentration camp, before the local branch of the Polish Red Cross was shut down by the Germans in 1940.

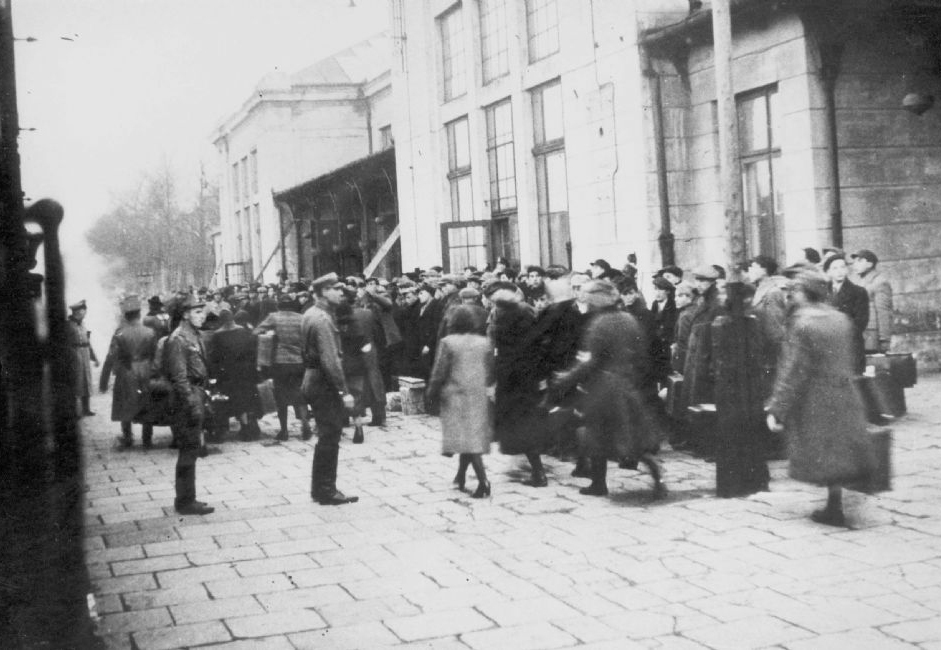
Liquidation of the Sosnowiec Ghetto in 1943 by the Germans during World War II

In June 1943 thousands of Jews were deported from Sosnowiec Ghetto to the Auschwitz concentration camp. The ghetto was liquidated two months later and almost all remaining Jews (around 15,000) were also deported to Auschwitz. Previously there had been considerable underground activity among them. The Germans established and operated two subcamps of the Auschwitz concentration camp in the city. In the first subcamp they held about 100 Polish forced labourers, and in the second, larger, they held hundreds of forced labourers, initially mostly Jews. In 1944, the Germans sent kidnapped Polish children from Sosnowiec to the Potulice concentration camp.

The Vistula–Oder Offensive of the Red Army in January 1945 brought about the liberation of the city.

=== Post-war ===
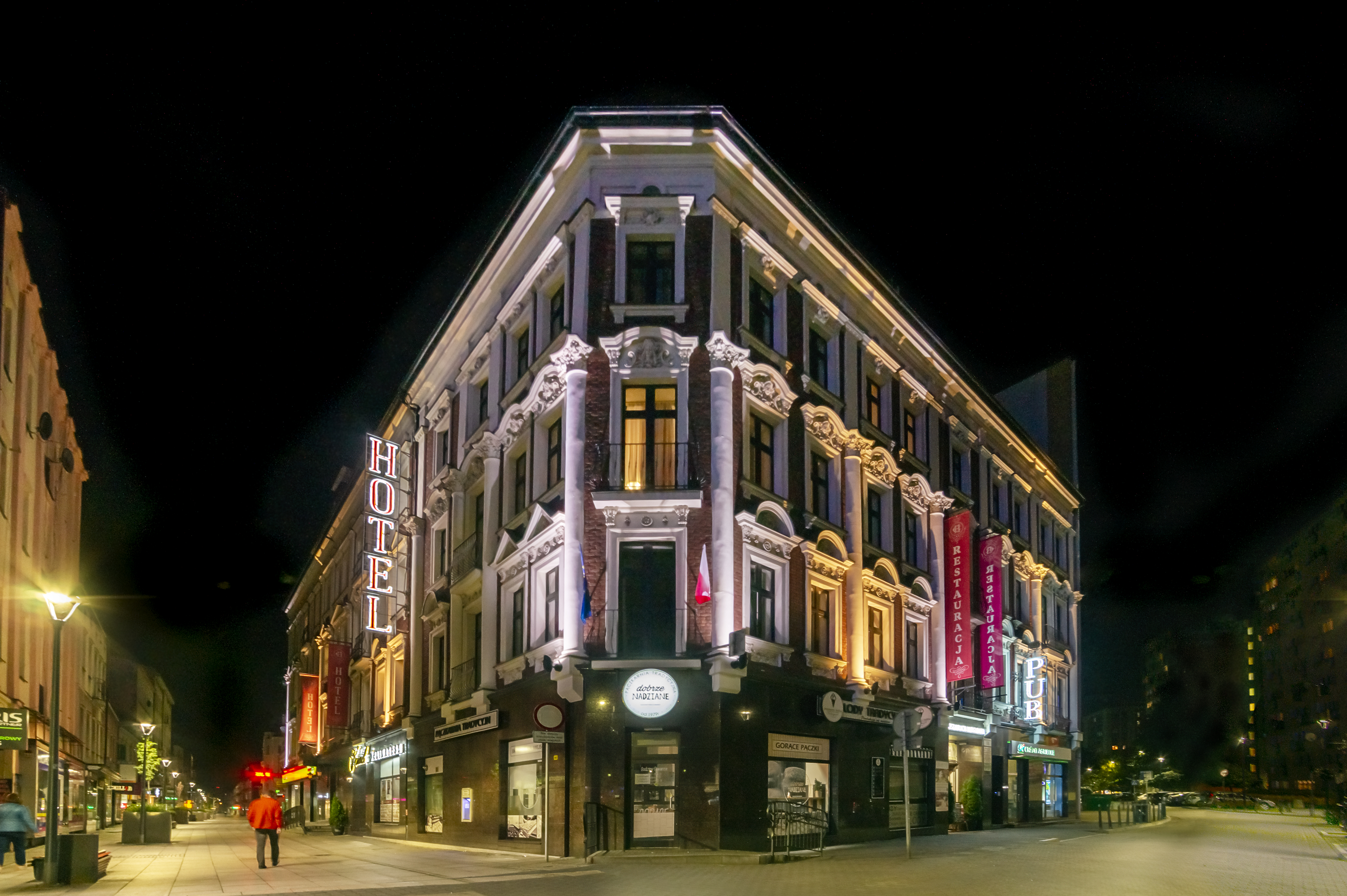
Hotel Centrum

After World War II, Sosnowiec further developed. On 1 June 1975, the metropolitan area was expanded when the neighbouring locations of Zagórze, Kazimierz Górniczy, Porąbka, Klimontów, and Maczki, became its districts. By 1977 the population of the city reached 200,000. Further growth was accelerated by the construction of Katowice Steelworks, and in 1981, the population of Sosnowiec was 250,000, reaching its peak in 1987, when it was 259,000. Since then, the population has been declining. In 1992, the city became the seat of the Roman Catholic Diocese of Sosnowiec.

== Economy ==
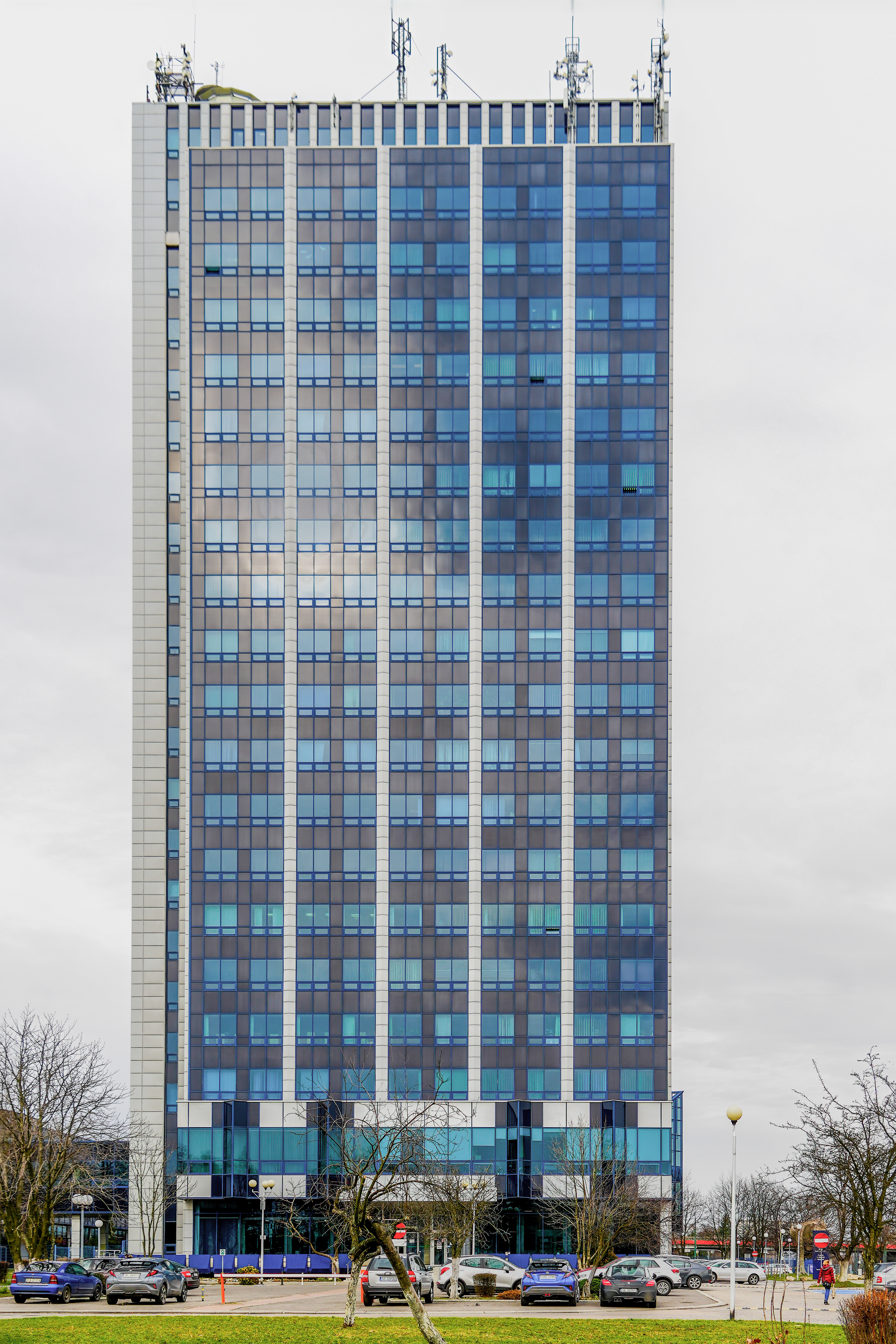
Faculty of Earth Science, University of Silesia

Sosnowiec is characterised by its urban dynamics, economic activity, cultural heritage, and natural environment. In recent years, Sosnowiec was further developed from an industrial centre (with mainly mining and heavy industries) into a hub of trade and services. Nevertheless, it still operates several important coal mines, steel factories and other industrial plants. Its Special Economic Zone, established in Sosnowiec thanks to the efforts of local authorities, plays a major role in attracting new businesses into the area. As a result, several companies with Polish and foreign capital opened their businesses in the city. Sosnowiec City Office was awarded the ISO 9001 2001 quality certificate for its management system for providing services for the local community.

== Demographics ==
Historical population

| Year | Pop. | ±% |
|---|---|---|
| 1910 | 98,748 | — |
| 1921 | 86,497 | −12.4% |
| 1931 | 109,454 | +26.5% |
| 1939 | 130,000 | +18.8% |
| 1950 | 96,448 | −25.8% |
| 1960 | 131,654 | +36.5% |

| Year | Pop. | ±% |
|---|---|---|
| 1970 | 145,000 | +10.1% |
| 1978 | 229,786 | +58.5% |
| 1988 | 258,635 | +12.6% |
| 2002 | 232,622 | −10.1% |
| 2011 | 216,420 | −7.0% |
| 2021 | 193,660 | −10.5% |

== Districts ==
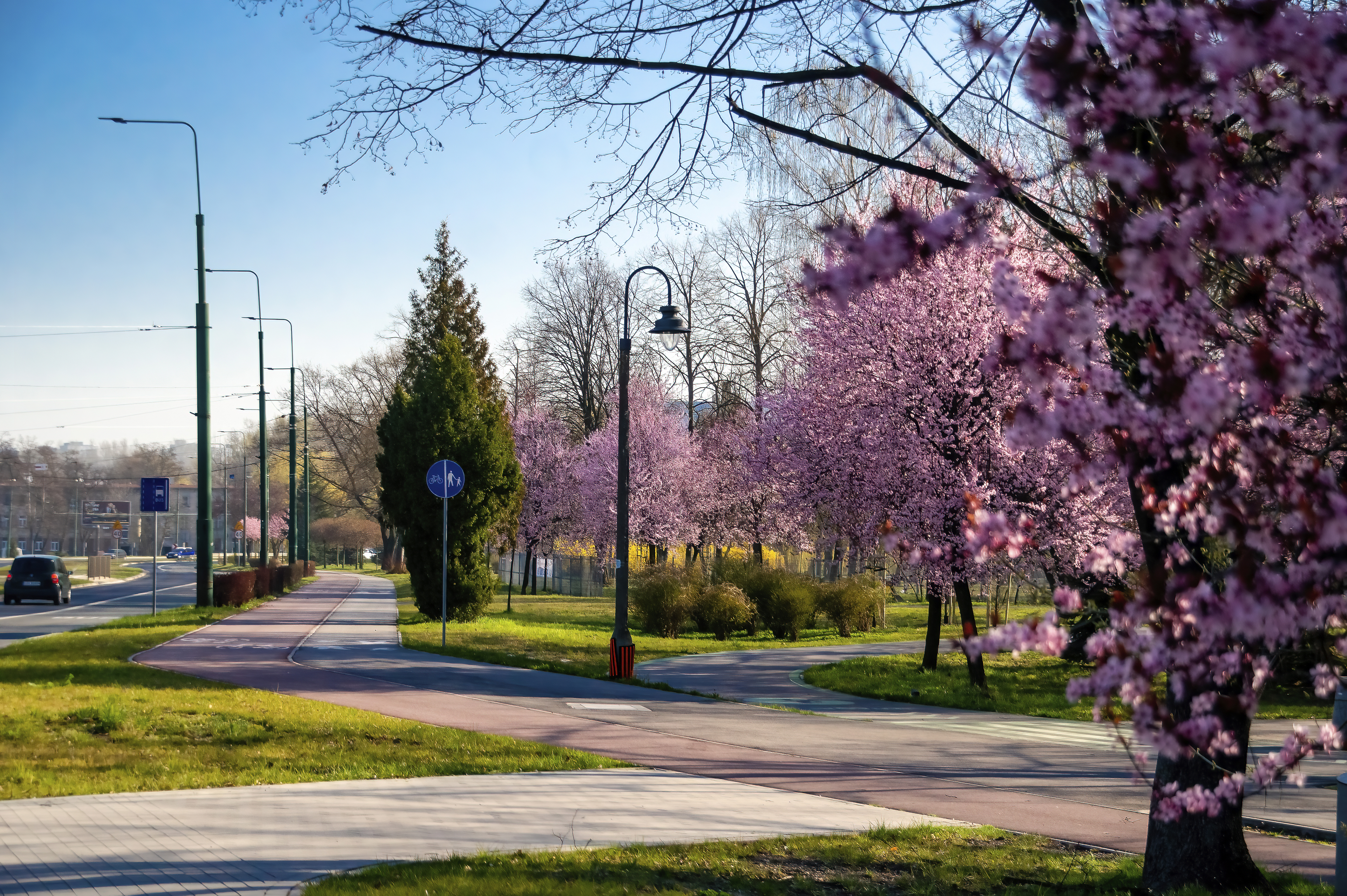
Sielec Park

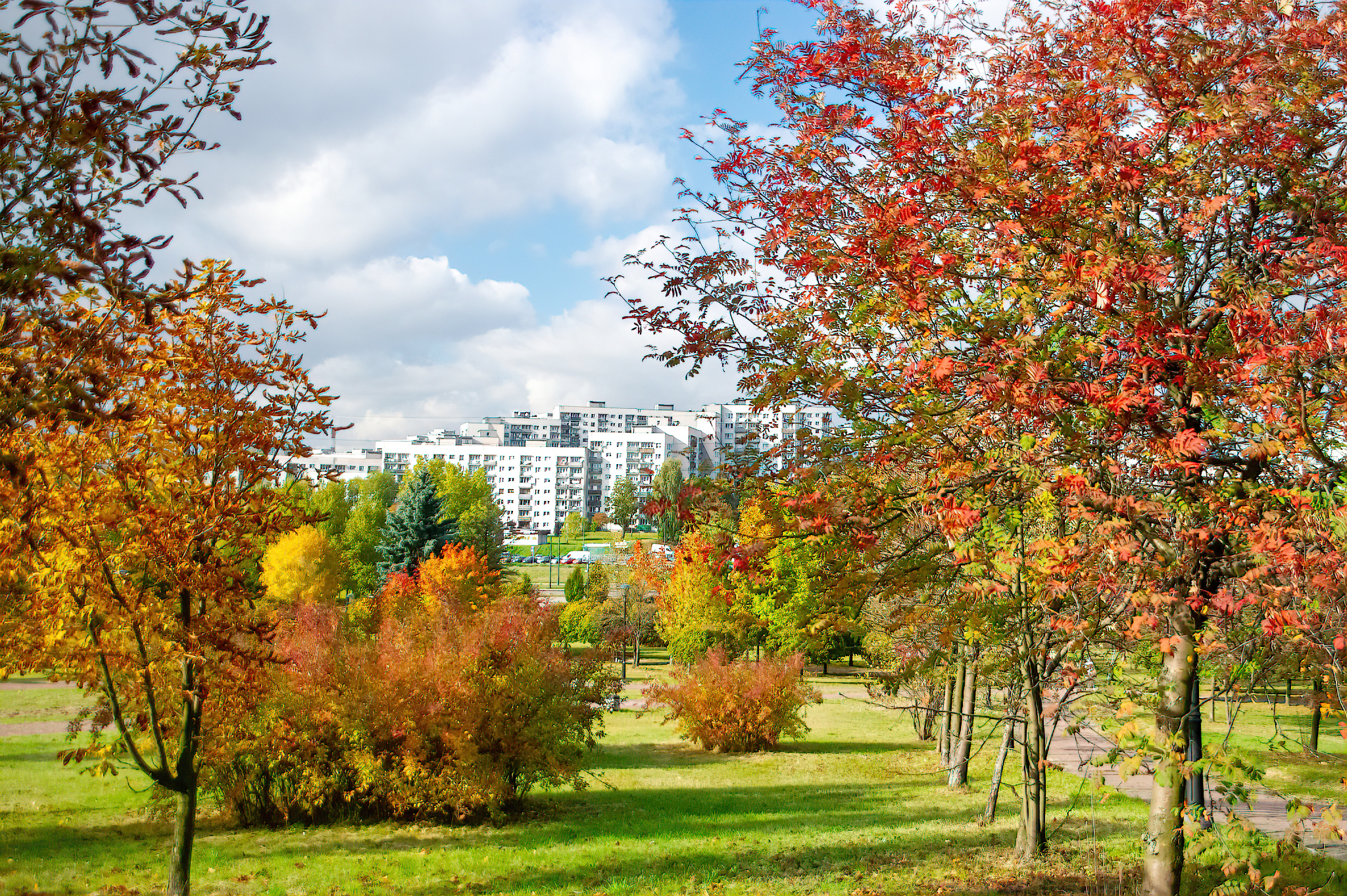
Środula district

For Sosnowiec's 100th birthday, the downtown area was thoroughly rebuilt, to harmonise its architectural layout and give the city a more modern image. In 2004 Sosnowiec authorities and designers were awarded the Grand Prix for the rebuilding of the downtown area in a competition for the best public space in the Śląskie Provinces. This investment had been accompanied by a program designed to improve the esthetic qualities of the city, under which a comprehensive program for unifying the colors of the elevations, and advertisements entitled “rainbow city” were introduced. Among the city districts there are:

- Dańdówka
- Dębowa Góra
- Jęzor
- Juliusz
- Kazimierz Górniczy
- Klimontów
- Maczki
- Milowice
- Modrzejów
- Niwka
- Ostra Górka
- Ostrowy Górnicze
- Pogoń
- Porąbka
- Radocha
- Rudna
- Sielec
- Stary Sosnowiec
- Środula
- Sosnowiec Śródmieście
- Zagórze

== Points of interest ==
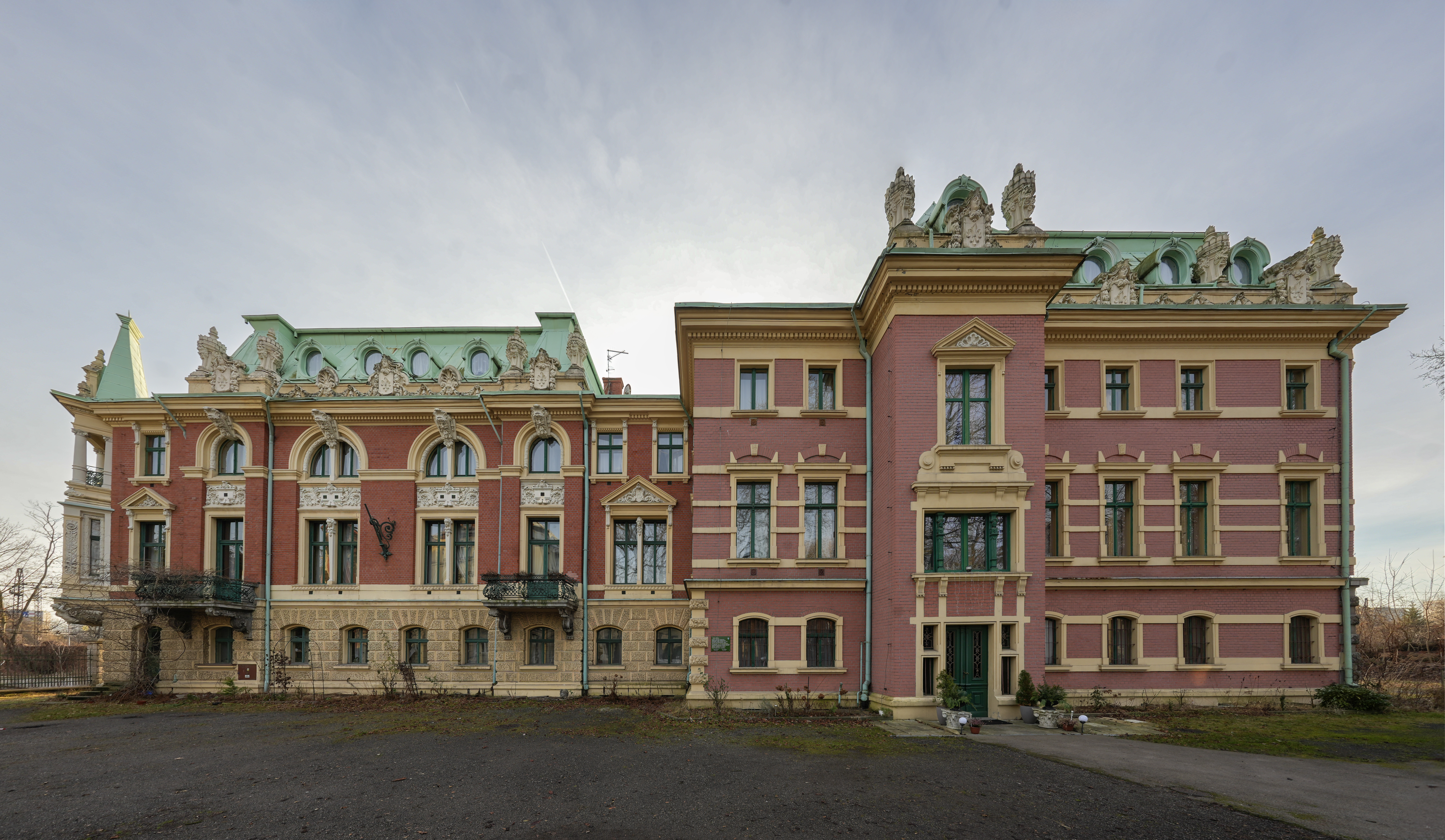
Dietel Palace

There are many relics of the industrial era, especially residences of industrialists. Most of them are located outside the strict city center, on the Czarna Przemsza river bank. One of the oldest is a 17th-century castle known as the Sielecki Castle. Other main tourist attractions include:

- Dietel Palace
- Ernst Schön Palace and museum
- Franz Schön's Palace called also New Schön Palace
- Wilhelm Schön Palace
- Cathedral Basilica of the Assumption of the Blessed Virgin Mary
- Orthodox Church of the Holy Virgin, Hope, Luby and their mother Zofia
- St. John Evangelical Church
- St Thomas Church
- Sosnowiec Główny railway station
- Sosnowiec Maczki railway station
- Old Jewish cemetery
- Three Emperors' Corner

=== Parks and gardens ===
Sosnowiec has an extensive system of urban green spaces. More than 2,250 ha of green areas occurring as parks, garden squares, protection zones, lot gardens and forests that includes historic parks, post-mining forests, ecological sites and riverfront promenades. Forests and tree-covered land occupy about 45% of the municipal area, of which roughly 14.9% are forests that have developed on former mining sites; municipal parks cover about 207 hectares (2.3% of the city). In promotional materials the city reports about 2,250 hectares of green areas (parks, squares and woodlands), and notes that several dozen individual trees are protected as natural monuments, while a group of historic parks are listed in the voivodeship heritage register.

The largest and one of the best-known historic parks is Sielec Park (Park Sielecki), which is a historical park at the castle with many natural monuments; The park originated in the 19th century as the landscaped grounds of an industrial estate and today contains a diverse collection of mature trees and shrubs, recreational infrastructure and a bathing pool, with the Czarna Przemsza river flowing through its central axis. Together with the nearby palace and castle complexes it forms one of the main green spaces in the city centre.

Other historical parks are: Dietel Park; the Park-Palace Complex of Schöen with two palaces and the Wanda Malczewska Park.

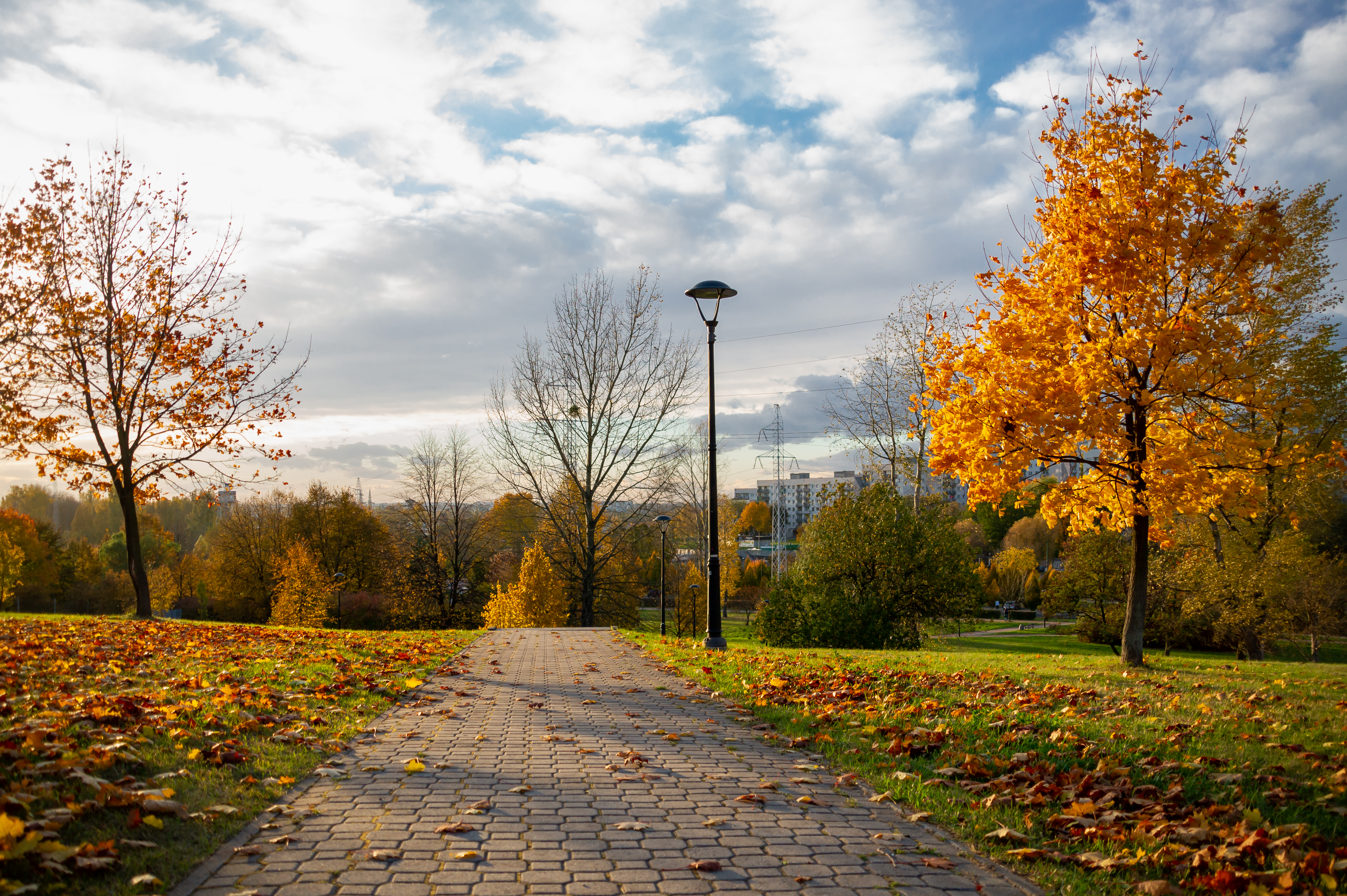
Fall 2021 in Środula Park

Very popular in the city are the Millennium Park and the Środula Park with a sports complex;

Another major recreational area is the Jacek Kuroń Park (Park im. Jacka Kuronia) in the eastern district of Kazimierz Górniczy. Established largely through the efforts of miners from the former “Kazimierz–Juliusz” coal mine, it combines wooded areas, playgrounds and walking and cycling paths with a small zoological garden featuring domesticated and exotic animals. In 2011 the park was named after the Polish social activist, educator, and democratic opposition activist Jacek Kuroń. Within the park lies the partially wooded Leśna reservoir (Staw Leśna), whose shores retain a more natural character with riparian tree species typical of floodplain forests.

Alongside the formal parks, Sosnowiec has extensive urban forests, many of them located on post-mining brownfield sites and slag heaps that have spontaneously reforested or been afforested since the 20th century. A detailed study of these post-mining forests estimates their area at about 1,354 hectares, notes their mixed composition of native and introduced tree species, and emphasises their ecological and recreational value in a heavily industrialised conurbation. The city and regional planners increasingly treat these forests as an important element of sustainable urban development.

Several areas within the municipality have been given special protection status because of their natural value. In the far east of the city, in the Maczki area, lies the high bog known as “Torfowisko Bory”, designated as a Natura 2000 site; it preserves a rare raised-bog plant community with several species of sundews and other legally protected plants. In the south-eastern part of the city, in the valley of the Biała Przemsza, the “Śródleśne Łąki w Starych Maczkach” (Woodland Meadows in Stare Maczki) ecological site protects species-rich wet meadows and surrounding woodland, including several protected orchid species and other rare plants, as well as beaver habitats.

In 2025 a fragment of the Zagórze Forest (Las Zagórski) in the northern part of Sosnowiec, containing small ponds, wetlands and mixed woodland, was designated as the ecological site “Mokradła Lasu Zagórskiego” (Zagórze Forest Wetlands). Municipal authorities emphasised its high biodiversity, including breeding sites for amphibians, wetland birds and bats, and its role as an educational and recreational area for residents. Linear green corridors are also being developed along the Czarna Przemsza river, where riverside boulevards and walking routes connect several parks and residential districts.

=== Rivers and water bodies ===
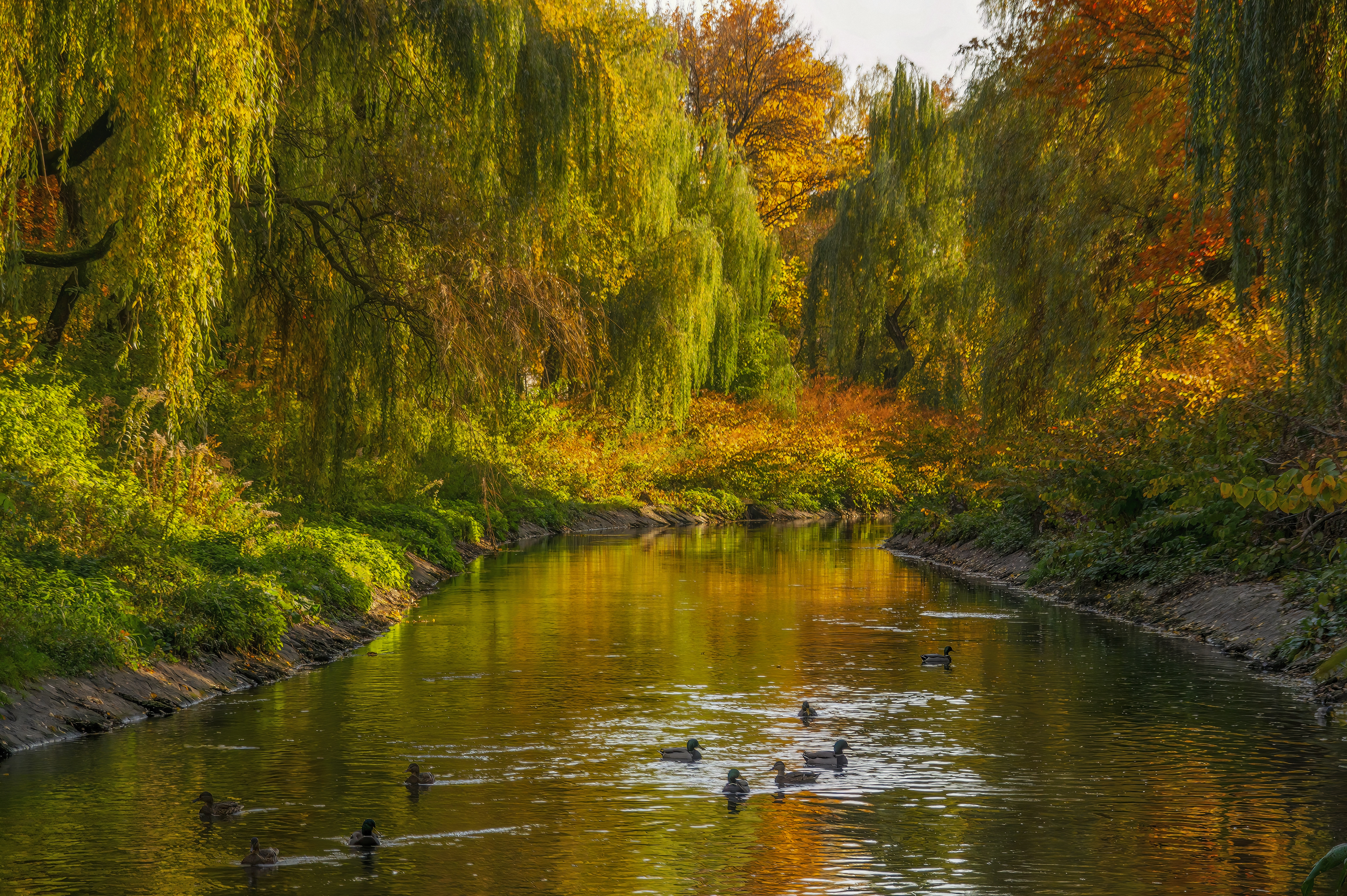
Czarna Przemsza flowing through Sielecki Park

Sosnowiec lies on the Silesian Upland in the basin of the Czarna Przemsza (Black Przemsza), a tributary of the Vistula, and at the confluence of the Czarna Przemsza and the Brynica rivers. The south-eastern edge of the municipality follows the valley of the Biała Przemsza (White Przemsza), whose floodplain meadows and riparian woods form part of protected sites such as the “Śródleśne Łąki w Starych Maczkach”. Smaller streams and drainage channels connect these rivers with post-mining lakes and wetlands spread across the urban area.

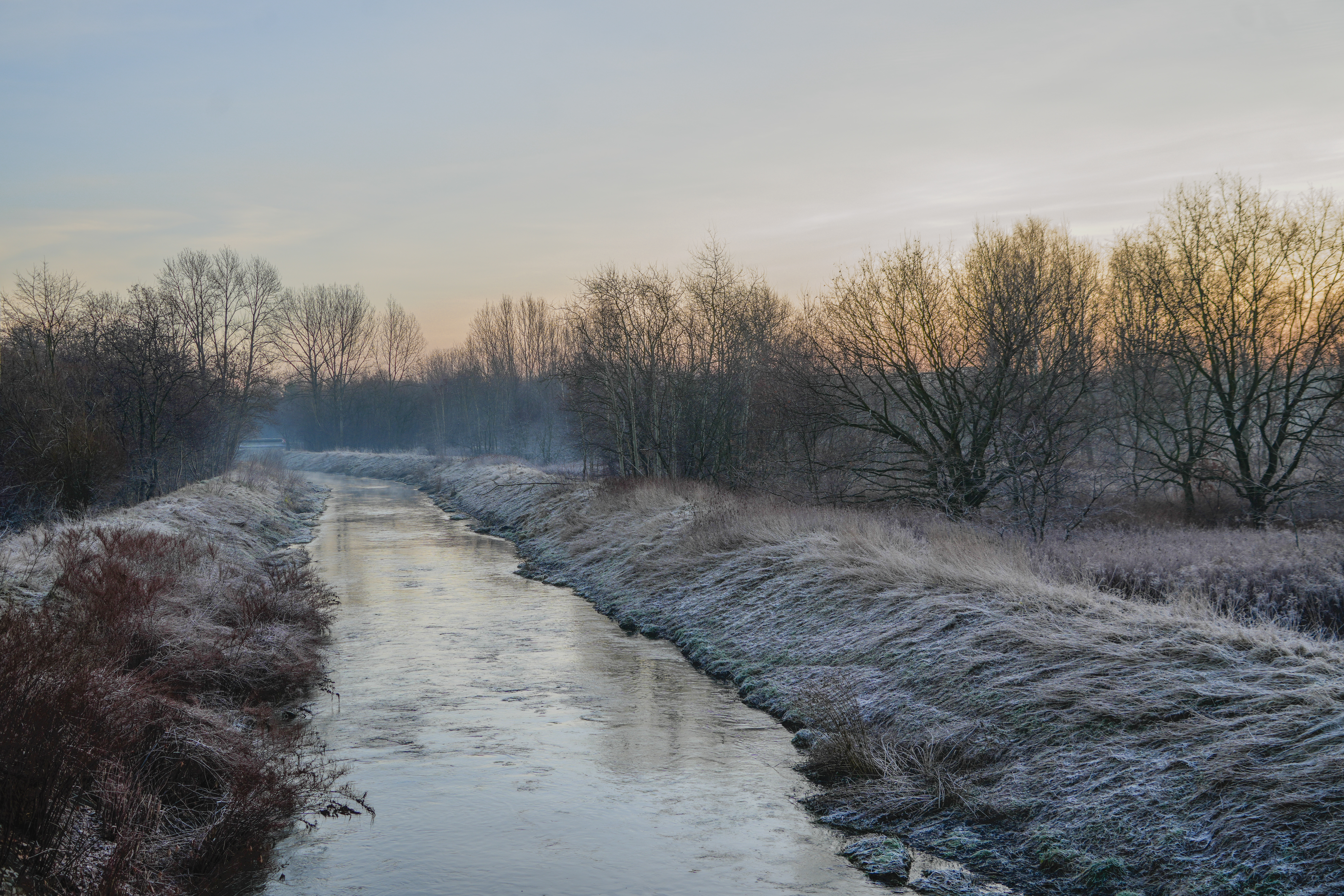
The Brynica River flowing through meadows on the border of Sosnowiec and Katowice in the morning

Historically, the Czarna Przemsza and Brynica were heavily affected by industrialisation and coal mining in the Upper Silesian Coal Basin. Recent hydrological studies of the Przemsza river basin show that, although the volume of saline mine waters discharged into the catchment has fallen significantly since the early 1990s, elevated salinity and other water-quality problems remain a concern in parts of the system. Despite this legacy of pollution, sections of the Czarna Przemsza within Sosnowiec have become important recreational corridors, with landscaped embankments, walking and cycling paths and access to adjacent parks.

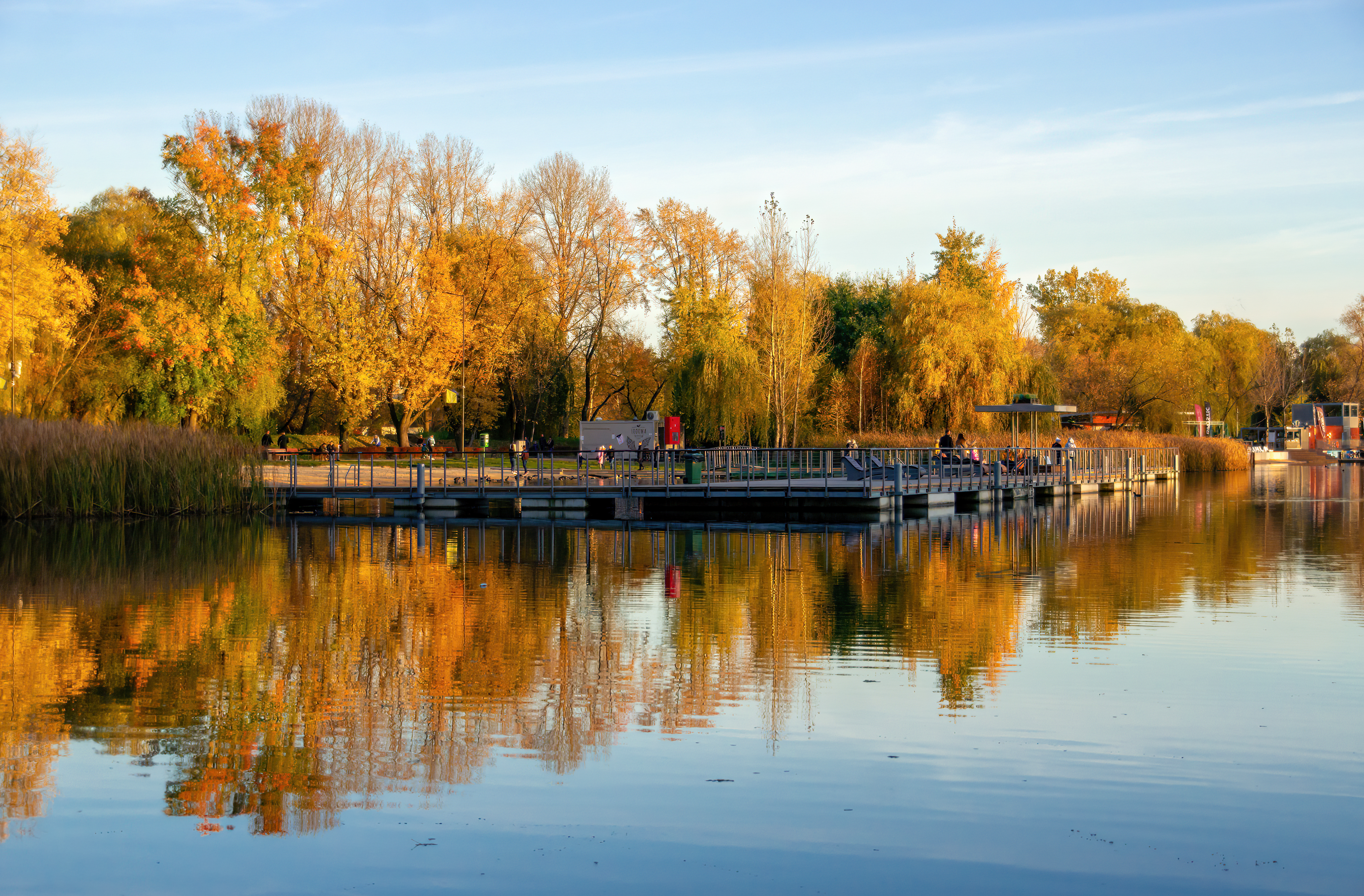
Pond Stawiki, pier and beach

Within the city limits there are several artificial lakes and ponds, many of them created by the flooding of former sand and clay pits. A tourist overview of the town notes three larger reservoirs—Balaton, Leśna and Stawiki—as well as a number of smaller water bodies. The Stawiki complex in the south-western part of the city consists of several interconnected ponds surrounded by woodland and sports facilities; the main lake is used as a bathing site with a sandy beach, running track, water-sports infrastructure and other recreational amenities managed by the municipal sports and recreation centre. The area has been modernised in the 21st century, with improved paths and leisure infrastructure, and serves as one of the main outdoor recreation zones for residents.

Another notable reservoir is Balaton (Staw Balaton) in the Niwka–Modrzejów area, created in a former clay pit and adapted for bathing and angling; it is surrounded by grassy banks and small wooded patches used for informal recreation. In Jacek Kuroń Park the Leśna reservoir offers a more natural setting, with wet woodland and riparian vegetation forming a transition between parkland and semi-natural habitats.

These rivers, post-mining lakes and wetland complexes, together with the surrounding forests and parks, form a mosaic of semi-natural and anthropogenic habitats that play an important role in the city’s microclimate, biodiversity and recreation.

== Education and science ==
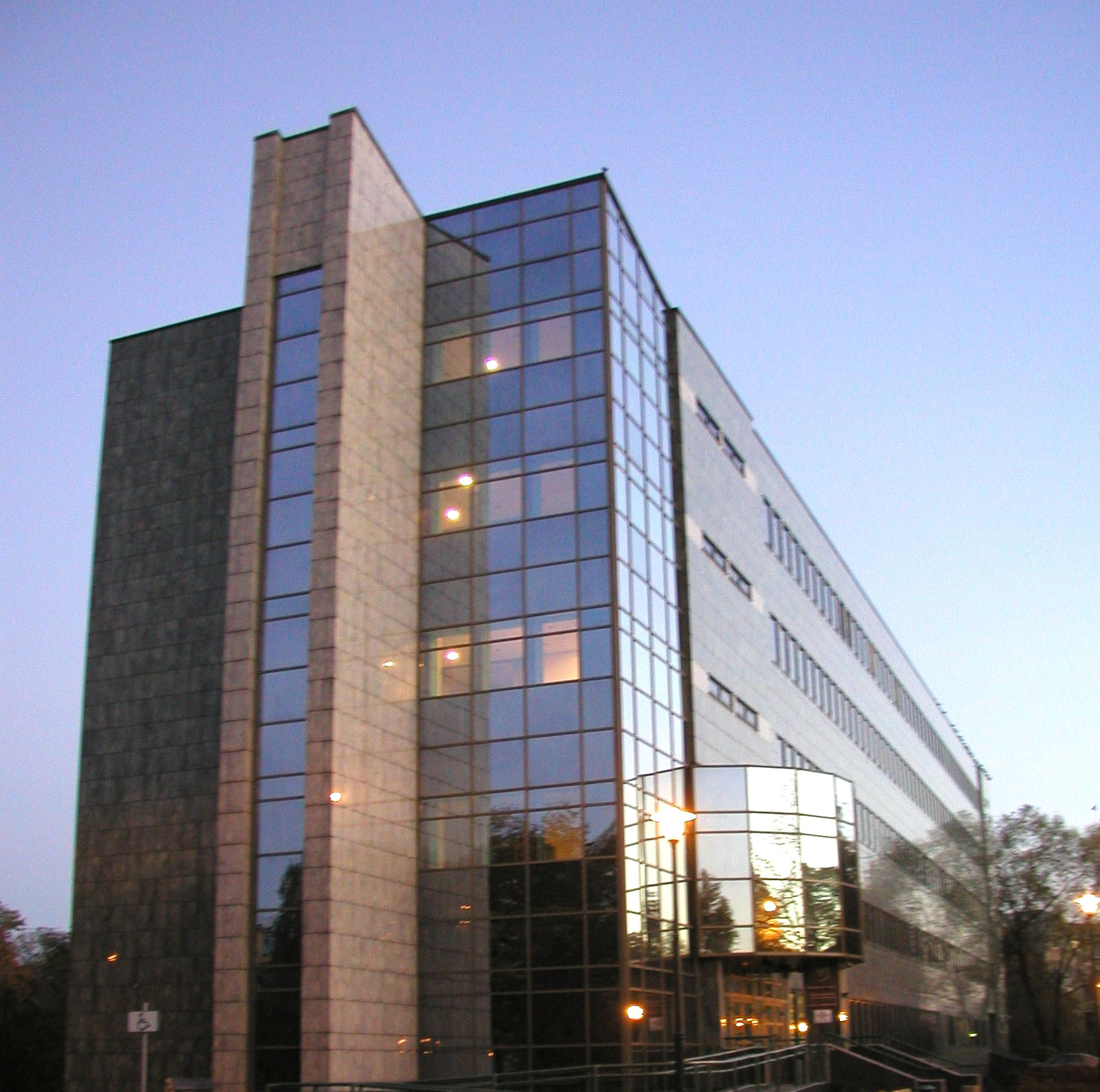
University of Silesia in Katowice - Faculty of Computer and Materials Science

Institutions of higher learning in Sosnowiec include:

- The University of Silesia in Katowice (schools of modern languages, natural science, technology and a language teacher training college)
  - Faculty of Earth Science
  - Faculty of Computer and Materials Science
  - Faculty of Philology
- The Medical University of Silesia in Katowice,
  - Faculty of Pharmacy
- The private School of Marketing and Management

Among general secondary level schools in Sosnowiec there are high-schools such as the II Liceum Ogólnokształcące im. Emilii Plater, III Liceum Ogólnokształcące im. Bolesława Prusa, and IV Liceum Ogólnokształcące im. Stanisława Staszica.

== Sports ==
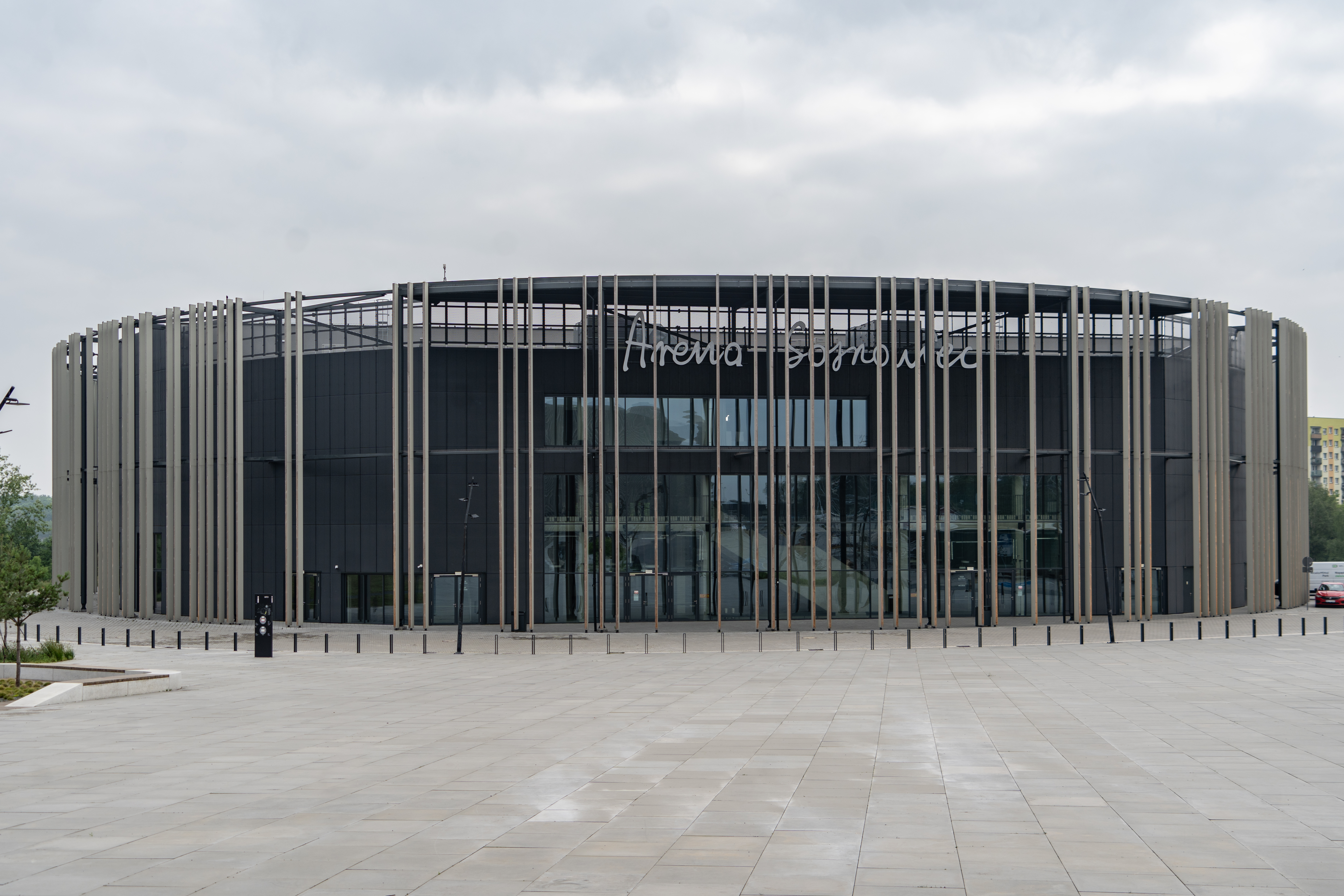
Arena Sosnowiec, home venue of the KH Zagłębie Sosnowiec ice hockey team

- Zagłębie Sosnowiec – men's football team, four times Polish Cup winner
- KH Zagłębie Sosnowiec – ice hockey team, which competes in the Polska Hokej Liga (top division), five times Polish champions
- Płomień Sosnowiec – men's volleyball team playing in Polish Volleyball League (top division), phoenix club of Płomień Milowice, in total 3 times Polish champions and winners of the 1977–78 CEV Champions League
- Czarni Sosnowiec – most accomplished Polish women's football club, 12 times Polish champions, playing in the Ekstraliga (top division)

== Notable people ==
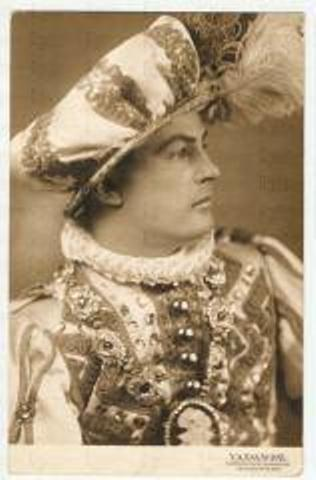
Jan Kiepura

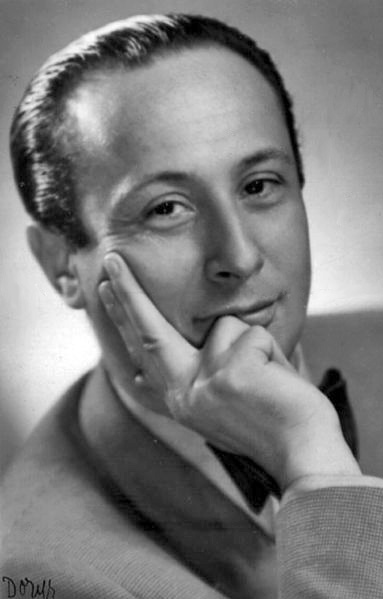
Władysław Szpilman

- Ignaz von Szyszylowicz (1857–1910), Polish botanist
- Shlomo Chanoch Rabinowicz (1882–1942), fourth and last Rebbe of the Radomsk Hasidic dynasty
- Jacek Mierzejewski (1883–1925), Polish painter
- Shlomo Sztencl (1884–1919), Polish Orthodox Jewish rabbi
- Władysław Szafer (1886–1970), Polish botanist and palaeobotanist
- Zbigniew Babiński (1896–1940), Polish military and sports aviator
- Shlomo Zev Zweigenhaft (1915–2005), Orthodox Jewish Rabbi
- Jan Kiepura (1902–1966), Polish singer and actor
- Paul Godwin (1902–1982), Polish-German violinist
- Jędrzej Giertych (1903–1992), Polish politician
- Art Spiegelman (born 1948), Polish-American cartoonist
- Władysław (Vladek) Spiegelman (1906–1982), father of Art Spiegelman
- Yehiel Feiner (1909–2001), the widely translated writer of Holocaust novels known by his pseudonym Ka-Tzetnik
- Władysław Szpilman (1911–2000), Polish pianist and classical composer, widely known as the central figure in the 2002 Roman Polanski film The Pianist
- Abraham (Boazik) Talmi (1911–2006), Israeli painter, musician and music educator who lived in Kibbutz Merhavia from 1936 until his death.”
- Edward Gierek (1913–2001), Polish communist politician; first secretary of the ruling Polish United Workers' Party (PZPR)
- Haim Hefer (1925–2012), Israeli poet and songwriter
- Stanisław Jaros (1932–1963), Polish anti-communist activist
- Krystyna Czajkowska (born 1936), Polish volleyball player
- Jacek M. Zurada (born 1944), Polish engineer
- James Spigelman (born 1946), Australian judge who served as Chief Justice of New South Wales from 1998 to 2011
- Jacek Majchrowski (born 1947), Polish politician and historian, Mayor of Kraków
- Magdalena Piekorz (born 1974), Polish film director and screenwriter
- Piotr Łukasiewicz (born 1974) is a Polish diplomat
- Łukasz Simlat (born 1977), Polish actor
- Joanna Krupa (born 1979), Polish-American model, actress and animal rights activist
- Marcin Drzymont (born 1981), Polish footballer
- Marcin Koniusz (born 1983), Polish sabre fencer
- Daria Gosek-Popiołek (born 1985), Polish politician
- Eugen Polanski (born 1986), Polish footballer
- Łukasz Litewka (1989–2026), Polish politician
- Paula Kania (born 1992), Polish tennis player
- Szwedzki, street artist, active since 2000
- Avrohom Yissochor Englard, Chief Rabbi of Sosnowiec

== International relations ==
=== Consulates ===
There is an Honorary Consulate of Bangladesh in Sosnowiec.

=== Twin towns – sister cities ===
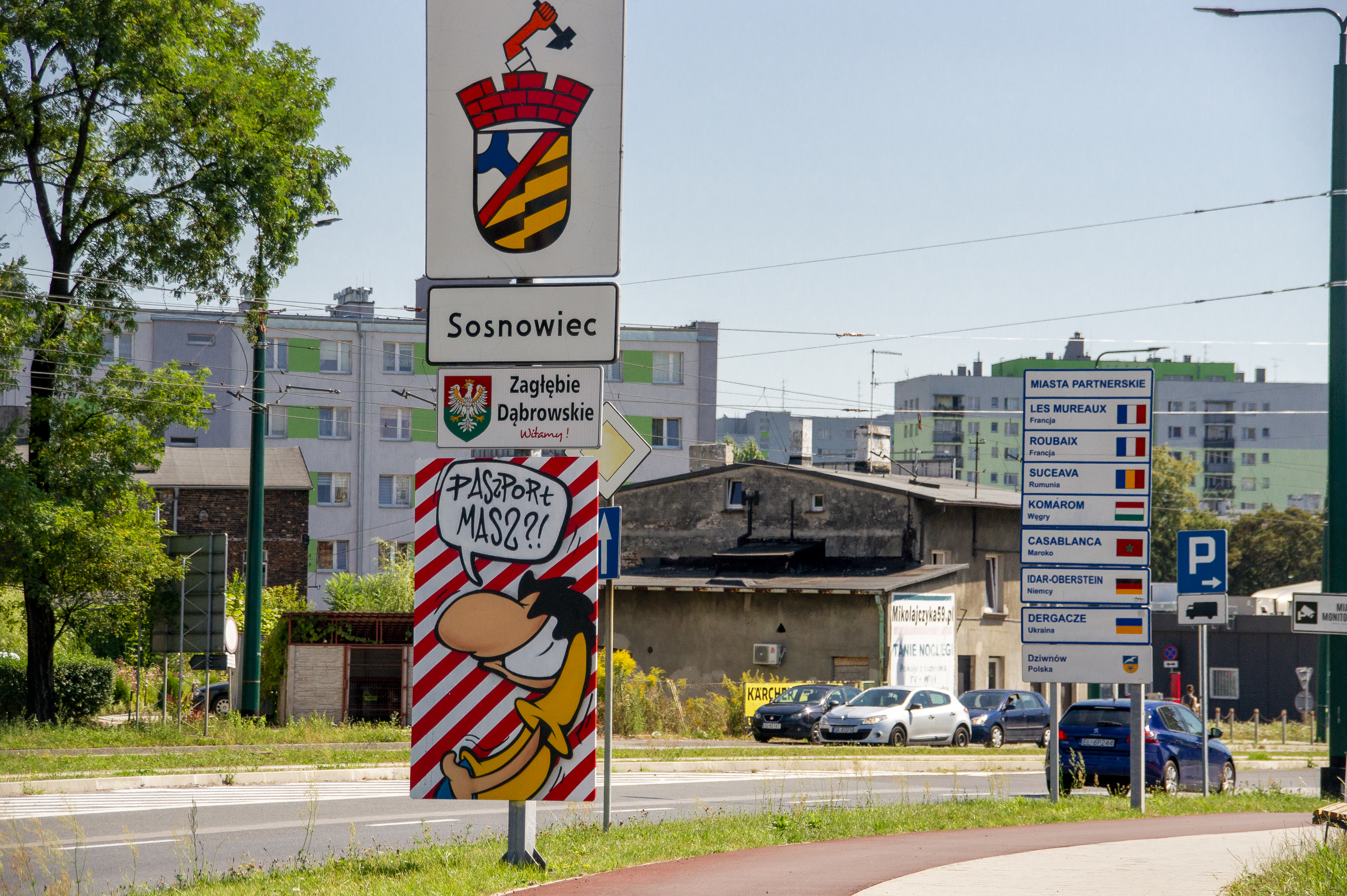
Sosnowiec twin towns

Sosnowiec is twinned with:

- Derhachi, Ukraine
- Dziwnów, Poland
- Idar-Oberstein, Germany
- Komárom, Hungary
- Maârif (Casablanca), Morocco
- Les Mureaux, France
- Roubaix, France
- Suceava, Romania
- Sambir, Ukraine
