= Franz Schön's Palace (Sosnowiec) =

Palace in Sosnowiec city in Poland

- Pałac Franza Schöna
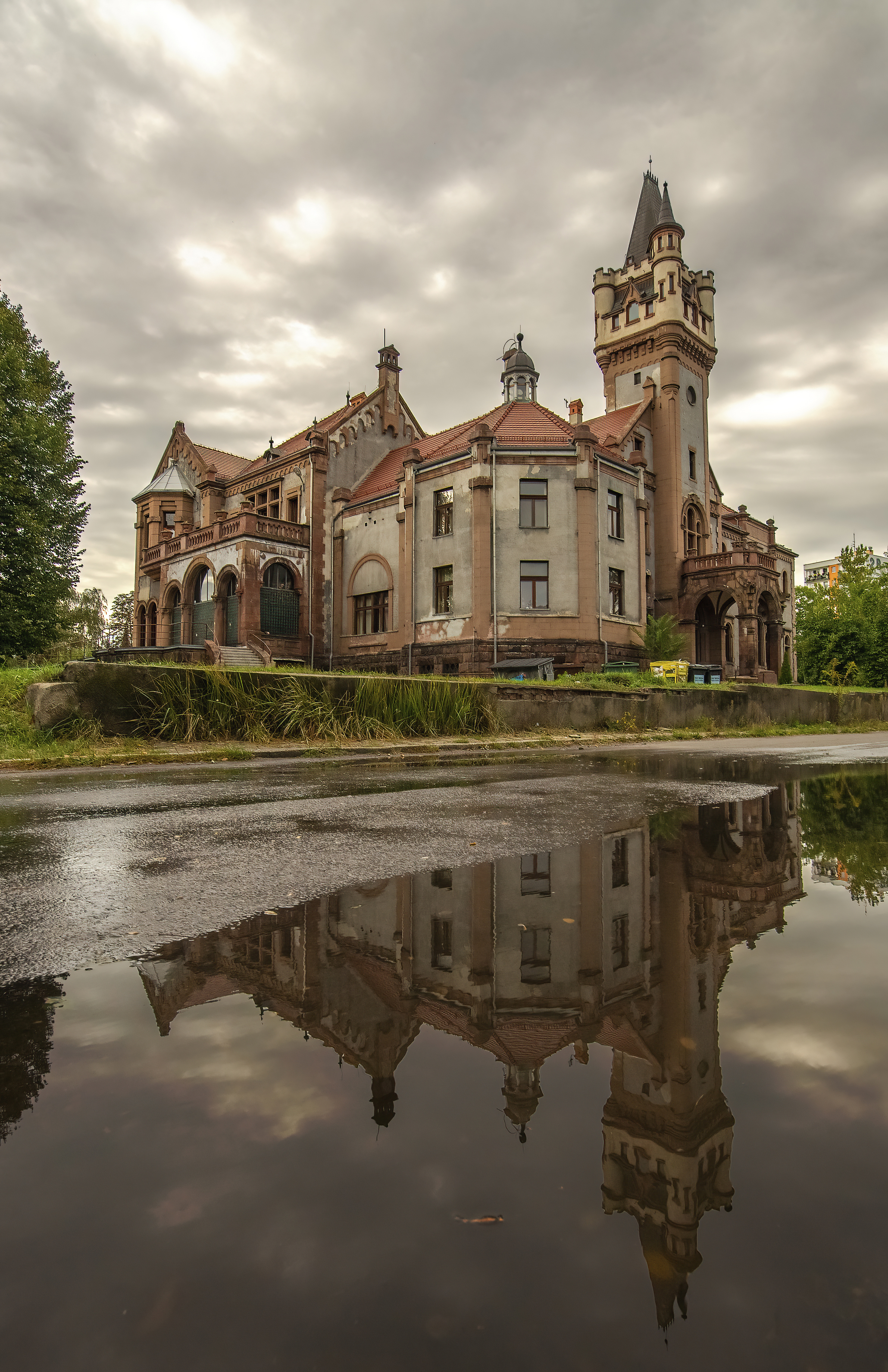
- Interactive map of the Franz Schön's Palace area
- Alternative names: New Schön's Palace

General information
- Architectural style: Eclectical
- Location: 1-go Maja 19, Sosnowiec, Poland
- Coordinates: 50°16′23″N 19°08′21″E
- Completed: 1903

Franz Schön's Palace called also New Schön's Palace or Oskar Schön's Palace – one of the two residences of the Schöen family, located on the merger of the districts and, at the time of its creation, the settlement: Ostra-Gorka and Sielec, on the left bank of the Black Przemsza River. The palace is located in the center of Sosnowiec.

== Architecture ==
As the only one amongst Sosnowiec's palaces, it is situated in the city center (1 Maja Street 19). Over the eclectic building of the palace, a distinctive neo-gothic tower in the style of English Gothic. Also, most of the body of the building is neo-Gothic style, but also are visible features in neo-Romanesque, Neo-Baroque and Art Nouveau style. The palace in its north-eastern part had a glass conservatory. During the renovation and adaptation of the palace for the needs of the judiciary, the orangery was covered with a roof and converted into office space.

The interior of the palace is characterized by a wealth of decorative elements, typical of the epoch. The central part of the interior of the palace is a hall and a spectacular staircase leading up to the 1st floor. The magnificent 2-storey ballroom with stylish interiors is based on patterns from the mid 18th century. The romance of the interiors of the residences of the Schons were to add hidden winding stairs and secret passages in the walls.

Initially, from the south and east, it was surrounded by a vast park and rocks. After the reconstruction of the center, after World War II, the park remained in remnant form and today it is a forest area, adjacent to the banks of the river.

Written along with the surrounding garden to the provincial register of monuments under the reg. No. 1370/88 of 10 February 1988.

== History ==
Erected in 1900 – 1903 in eclectic style, commissioned by Franz Schöna. The building was built on a plot, bought in 1885 by the Schön family, from Count Mortimer-Tschischky, on the bank of Black Przemsza River.

During the First Silesian Uprising, in 1919 the building of the palace was the headquarters of the uprising with headquarters of the defense of the plebiscite, preparing the III Silesian uprising in 1921.

Spinning fires in 1907 and World War I contributed to the deterioration of the financial situation of the family, thus the palace was leased for court. In 1923 the building was adapted for the court, during the German occupation, it housed Deutsches Haus. Since 1945, it has re-established the seat of the court.
