= John W. Schoen =

American journalist

- Born: John Wakeman Schoen; November 10, 1952 (age 73); Boston, Massachusetts, U.S.
- Education: Bowdoin College; Boston University

John Wakeman Schoen (born 1952 in Boston), an award-winning online journalist and a founder of msnbc.com, CNBC and public radio’s Marketplace, has reported and written about economics, business and financial news for more than 30 years.

== Career ==
Schoen began his career as a newspaper reporter and editor in Connecticut, moving to Dow Jones as radio newscaster and writer for The Wall Street Journal. As a reporter for the CBS Radio Network’s half-hour program, Business Update, he covered Wall Street's insider trading scandals and the Crash of '87. When the program was revamped as Marketplace, and production moved to Los Angeles, Schoen became the first New York editor, covering Wall Street and a variety of other business stories.

He joined CNBC before it went on the air in 1989 and ran the network's newsdesk during the early 1990s, managing news operations in New York, Washington, Chicago, Los Angeles, London and Tokyo. In 1996, Schoen joined msnbc.com as a senior producer helping to launch the site. In 2012, the site became NBCNews.com, where he wrote about a variety of business topics.

In the summer of 2012, he reported on the economic and financial turmoil in Europe as a fellow with the RIAS RTDNF German-American Journalist Exchange Program.

In 2011, he was part of a team of msnbc.com reporters and editors that won a Best in Business Journalism award from the Society of American Business Editors and Writers for a series of reports, Still Made in America, about the ongoing transformation of the American manufacturing industry.

In 2010, Schoen was chosen as a fellow on the first China U.S. Journalist Exchange, sponsored by the East West Center. He produced a series of reports, China 2.0, describing the increasing strains on China’s rapidly growing economy.

In 2008, his series The Mortgage Mess also won a SABEW Best in Business award. The report was one of the earliest to warn of the looming threat of a collapse of the housing market.

Schoen was a 2005 finalist for a Gerald Loeb Award for Distinguished Business and Financial Journalism.

He left CNBC in 2021 to pursue other projects and consult with clients on data, media strategy and audience engagement.
