= 2014 United States House of Representatives elections in Louisiana =

- November 4, 2014

All 6 Louisiana seats to the United States House of Representatives
	Majority party	Minority party
Party	Republican	Democratic
Last election	5	1
Seats won	5	1
Seat change	Steady	Steady
Popular vote	1,031,270	406,186
Percentage	65.74%	25.89%
Swing	▼1.28%	▲4.83%

Republican
40–50%
50–60%
60–70%
70–80%
80–90%
90>%
Democratic
50–60%
60–70%
70–80%
80–90%

The 2014 United States House of Representatives elections in Louisiana were held on Tuesday, November 4, 2014, to elect the six U.S. representatives from the state of Louisiana, one from each of the state's six congressional districts. The elections coincided with those of other federal and state offices, including the United States Senate.

Under Louisiana's jungle primary system, all candidates appeared on the same ballot, regardless of party. If no candidate received 50 percent plus one vote during the primary election, a runoff election was held on December 6, 2014, between the top two candidates in the primary.

== Overview ==
Results of the 2014 United States House of Representatives elections in Louisiana by district:

District	Republican		Democratic		Others		Total		Result
District	Votes	%	Votes	%	Votes	%	Votes	%	Result
District 1	189,250	77.56%	46,047	18.87%	8,707	3.57%	244,004	100.0%	Republican hold
District 2	0	0.00%	190,006	85.75%	31,564	14.25%	221,570	100.0%	Democratic hold
District 3	207,926	88.00%	0	0.00%	28,342	12.00%	236,268	100.0%	Republican hold
District 4	152,683	73.43%	0	0.00%	55,236	26.57%	207,919	100.0%	Republican hold
District 5	247,211	75.81%	75,006	23.00%	3,856	1.18%	326,073	100.0%	Republican hold
District 6	234,200	70.35%	95,127	28.58%	3,561	1.07%	332,888	100.0%	Republican hold
Total	1,031,270	65.74%	406,186	25.89%	131,266	8.37%	1,568,722	100.0%	

== District 1 ==
2014 Louisiana's 1st congressional district election
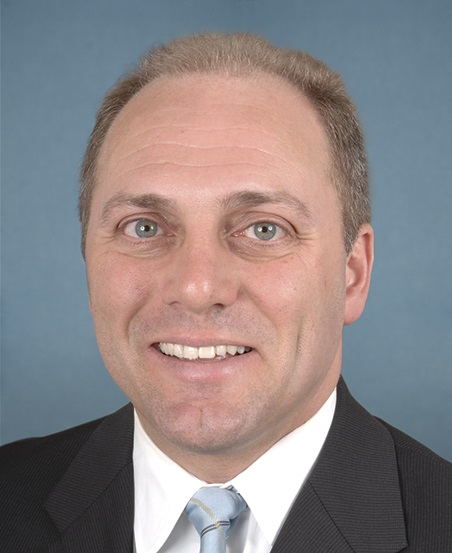

Candidate	Steve Scalise	M. V. "Vinny" Mendoza	Lee A. Dugas
Party	Republican	Democratic	Democratic
Popular vote	189,250	24,761	24,844
Percentage	77.6%	10.1%	8.7%
- Parish results Scalise: 60–70% 70–80% 80–90%
U.S. Representative before election
Steve Scalise
Republican
Elected U.S. Representative
Steve Scalise
Republican

Republican incumbent Steve Scalise, who has represented the 1st district since 2008, considered running for the U.S. Senate, but instead ran for re-election. He faced Democrats Lee A. Dugas and M. V. "Vinny" Mendoza and Libertarian Jeffry "Jeff" Sanford in the election.

=== Predictions ===
Source	Ranking	As of
The Cook Political Report	Safe R	November 3, 2014
Rothenberg	Safe R	October 24, 2014
Sabato's Crystal Ball	Safe R	October 30, 2014
RCP	Safe R	November 2, 2014
Daily Kos Elections	Safe R	November 4, 2014

Louisiana's 1st congressional district, 2014
Party	Candidate	Votes	%
Republican	Steve Scalise (incumbent)	189,250	77.6
Democratic	M. V. "Vinny" Mendoza	24,761	10.1
Democratic	Lee A. Dugas	21,286	8.7
Libertarian	Jeffry "Jeff" Sanford	8,707	3.6
Total votes		244,004	100.0
Republican hold			

== District 2 ==
2014 Louisiana's 2nd congressional district election
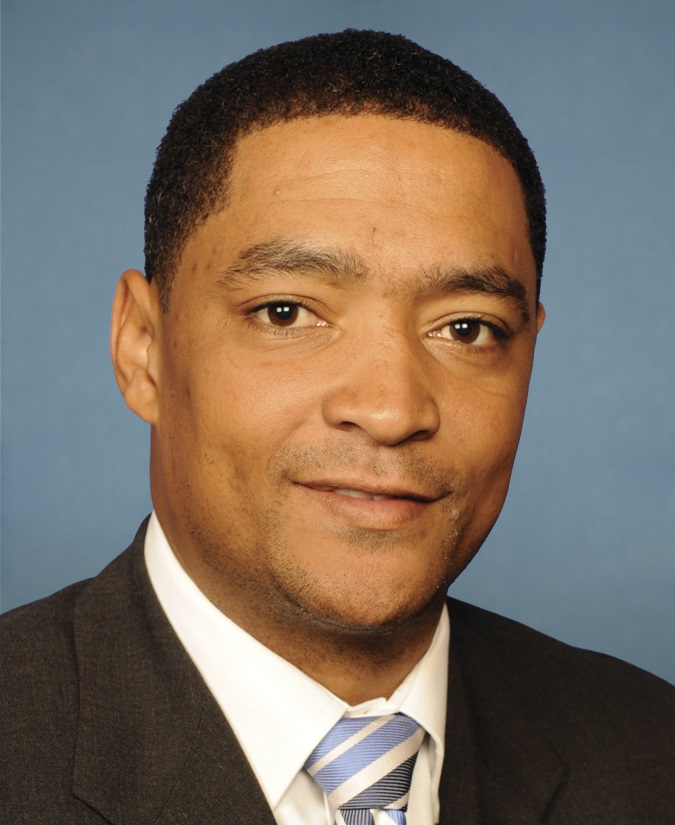

Candidate	Cedric Richmond	Gary Landrieu
Party	Democratic	Democratic
Popular vote	152,201	37,805
Percentage	68.7%	17.0%
Candidate	David Brooks	Samuel Davenport
Party	Independent	Libertarian
Popular vote	16,327	15,237
Percentage	7.4%	6.9%
- Parish results Richmond: 40–50% 50–60% 60–70% 80–90%
U.S. Representative before election
Cedric Richmond
Democratic
Elected U.S. Representative
Cedric Richmond
Democratic

Democratic incumbent Cedric Richmond, who has represented the 2nd district since 2011, ran for re-election. He faced Democrat Gary Landrieu, Libertarian Samuel Davenport and Independent David Brooks in the election. Democrat Rufus H. Johnson had filed to run, but was disqualified following a lawsuit from Richmond's campaign.

=== Predictions ===
Source	Ranking	As of
The Cook Political Report	Safe D	November 3, 2014
Rothenberg	Safe D	October 24, 2014
Sabato's Crystal Ball	Safe D	October 30, 2014
RCP	Safe D	November 2, 2014
Daily Kos Elections	Safe D	November 4, 2014

Louisiana's 2nd congressional district, 2014
Party	Candidate	Votes	%
Democratic	Cedric Richmond (incumbent)	152,201	68.7
Democratic	Gary Landrieu	37,805	17.0
Independent	David Brooks	16,327	7.4
Libertarian	Samuel Davenport	15,237	6.9
Total votes		221,570	100.0
Democratic hold			

== District 3 ==
2014 Louisiana's 3rd congressional district election
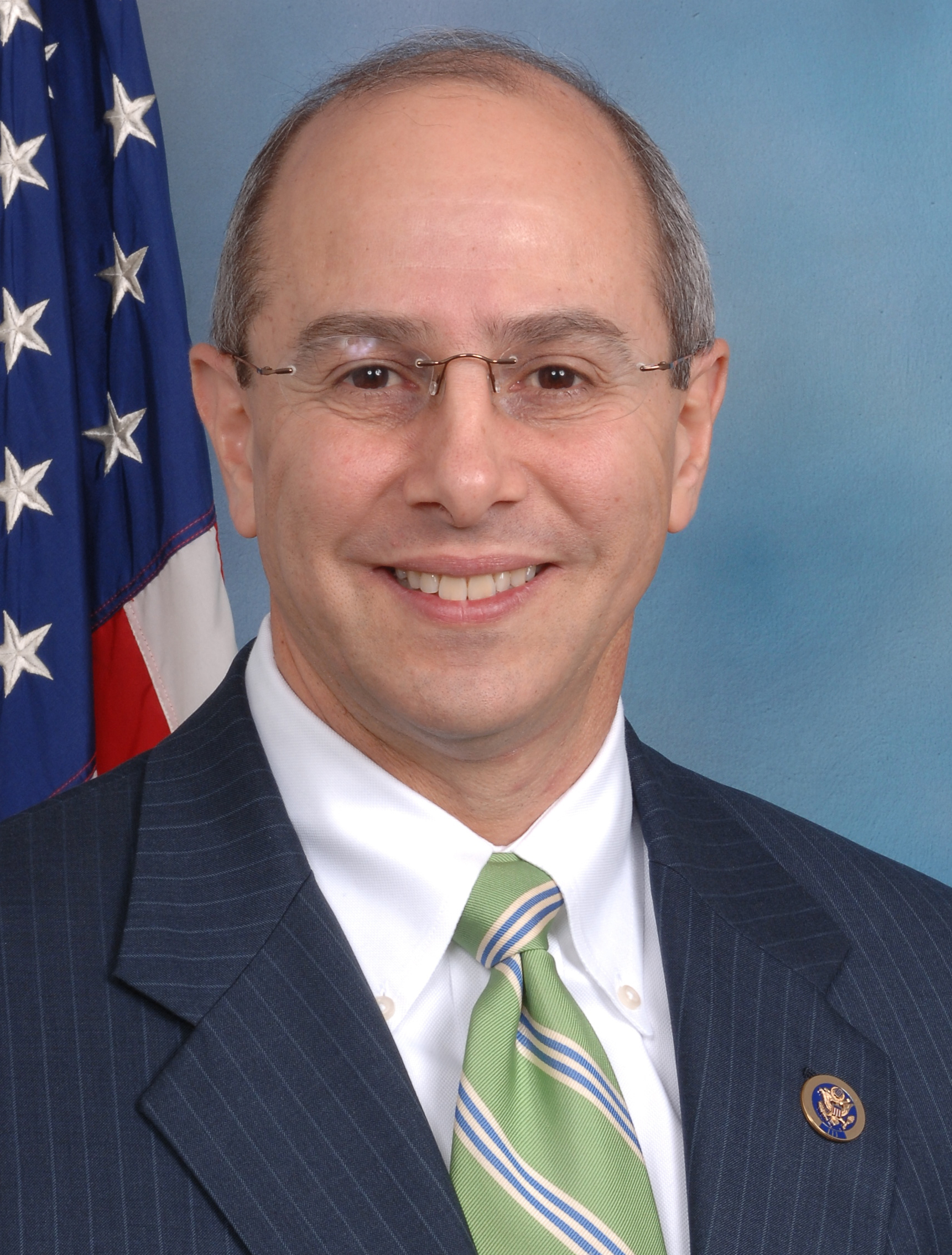

Candidate	Charles Boustany	Russell Richard	Bryan Barrilleaux
Party	Republican	Independent	Republican
Popular vote	185,867	28,342	22,059
Percentage	78.7%	12.0%	9.3%
- Parish results Higgins: 60–70% 70–80% 80–90%
U.S. Representative before election
Charles Boustany
Republican
Elected U.S. Representative
Charles Boustany
Republican

Republican incumbent Charles Boustany, who has represented the 3rd district since 2013, and previously represented the 7th district from 2005 to 2013, considered running for the U.S. Senate, but instead ran for re-election. He faced Republican Bryan Barrilleaux and Independent Russell Richard in the election.

=== Predictions ===
Source	Ranking	As of
The Cook Political Report	Safe R	November 3, 2014
Rothenberg	Safe R	October 24, 2014
Sabato's Crystal Ball	Safe R	October 30, 2014
RCP	Safe R	November 2, 2014
Daily Kos Elections	Safe R	November 4, 2014

Louisiana's 3rd congressional district, 2014
Party	Candidate	Votes	%
Republican	Charles Boustany (incumbent)	185,867	78.7
Independent	Russell Richard	28,342	12.0
Republican	Bryan Barrilleaux	22,059	9.3
Total votes		236,268	100.0
Republican hold			

== District 4 ==
2014 Louisiana's 4th congressional district election
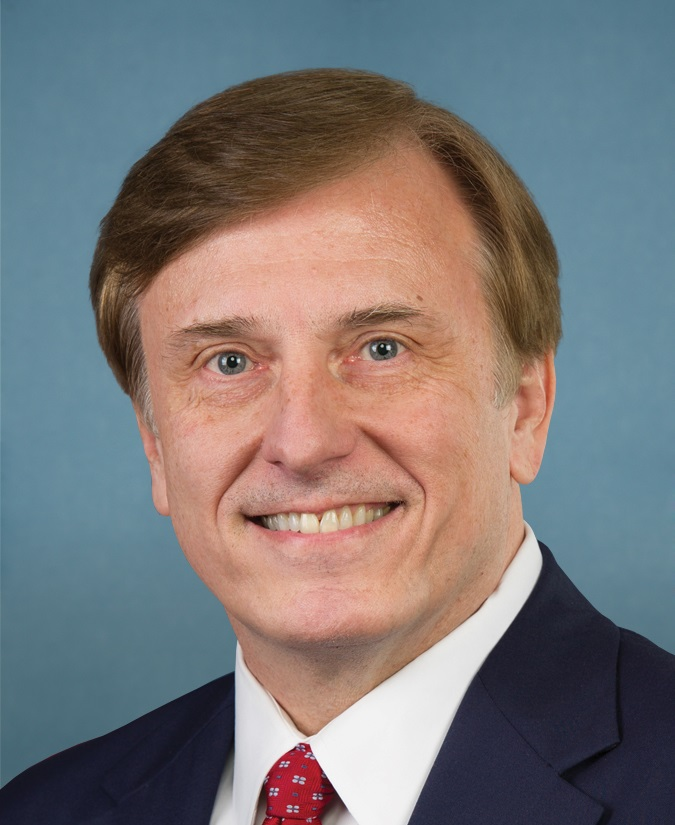

Candidate	John Fleming	Randall Lord
Party	Republican	Libertarian
Popular vote	152,683	55,236
Percentage	73.4%	26.6%
- Parish results Fleming: 60–70% 70–80% 80–90%
U.S. Representative before election
John Fleming
Republican
Elected U.S. Representative
John Fleming
Republican

Republican incumbent John Fleming, who has represented the 4th district since 2009, considered running for the U.S. Senate, but instead ran for re-election. He faced Libertarian Randall Lord in the election. Democrat Justin Ansley had been running, but withdrew from the race.

=== Predictions ===
Source	Ranking	As of
The Cook Political Report	Safe R	November 3, 2014
Rothenberg	Safe R	October 24, 2014
Sabato's Crystal Ball	Safe R	October 30, 2014
RCP	Safe R	November 2, 2014
Daily Kos Elections	Safe R	November 4, 2014

Louisiana's 4th congressional district, 2014
Party	Candidate	Votes	%
Republican	John Fleming (incumbent)	152,683	73.4
Libertarian	Randall Lord	55,236	26.6
Total votes		207,919	100.0
Republican hold			

== District 5 ==
2014 Louisiana's 5th congressional district election
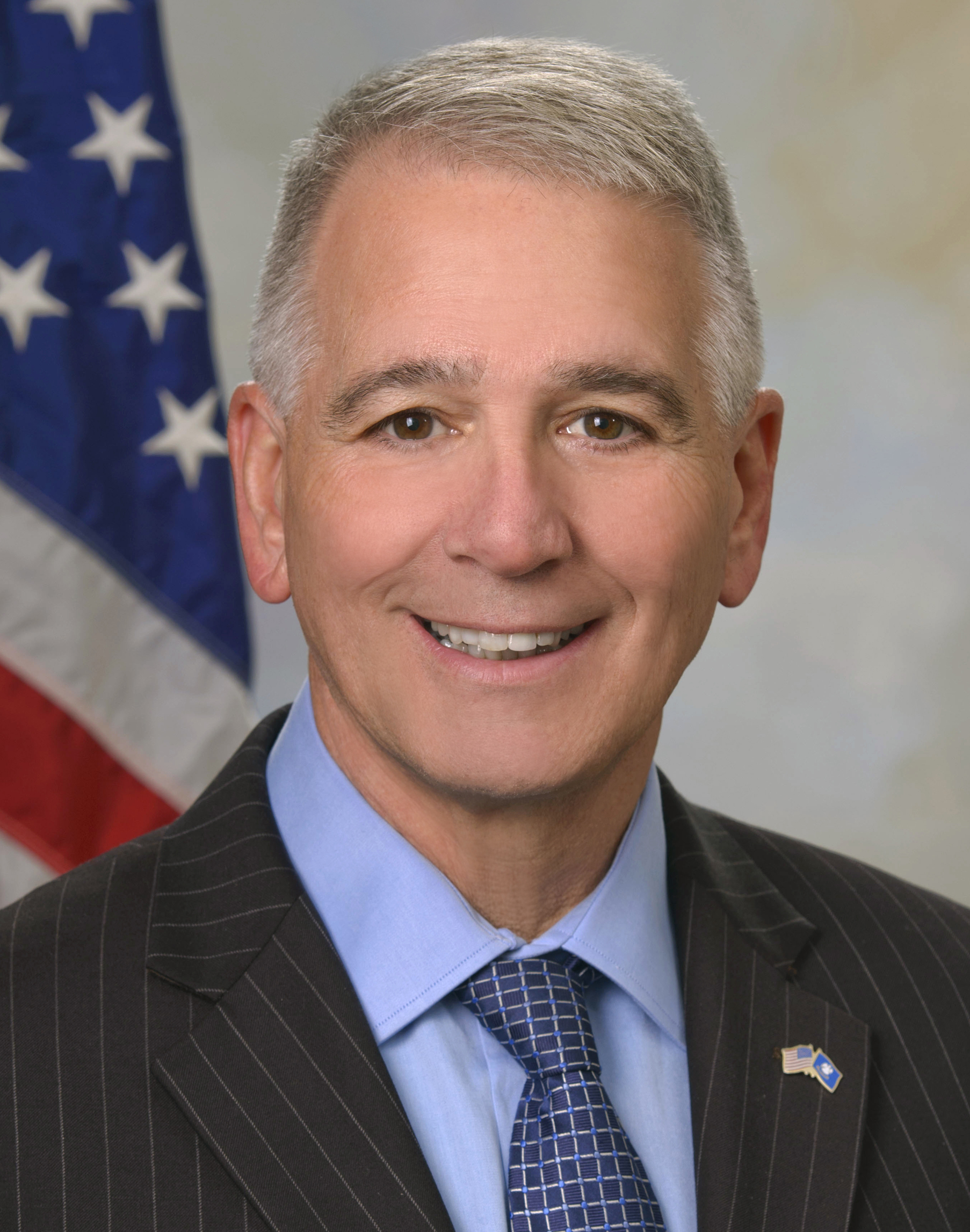

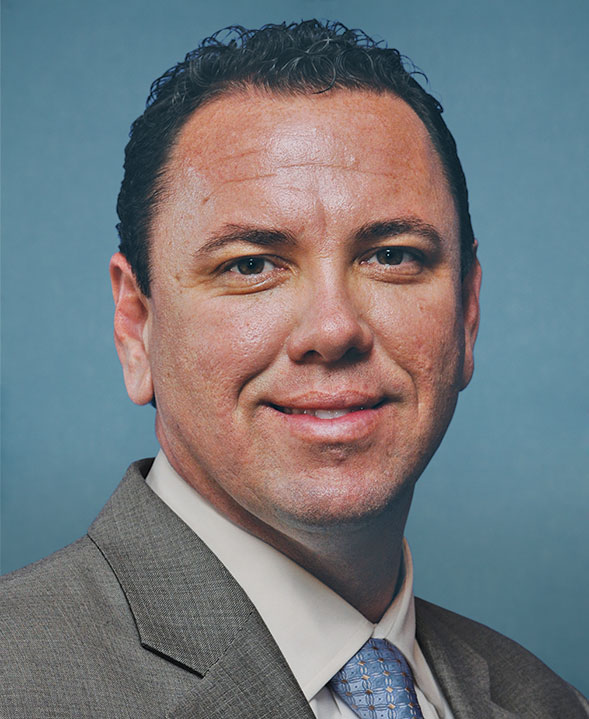

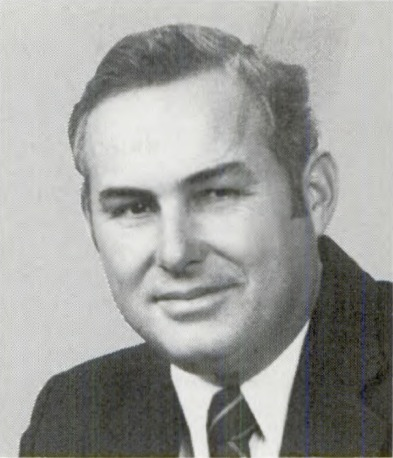
Candidate	Ralph Abraham	Jamie Mayo	Zach Dasher
Party	Republican	Democratic	Republican
First round	55,489; 23.2%	67,611; 28.2%	53,628; 22.4%
Runoff	134,616; 64.2%	75,006; 35.8%	Eliminated
Candidate	Vance McAllister	Clyde C. Holloway
Party	Republican	Republican
First round	26,606; 11.1%	17,877; 7.5%
Runoff	Eliminated	Eliminated
- Abraham: 30–40% 40–50% 50–60% 60–70% 70–80% 80–90% Mayo: 20–30% 30–40% 40–50% 50–60% 60–70% Dasher: 20–30% 30–40%
U.S. Representative before election
Vance McAllister
Republican
Elected U.S. Representative
Ralph Abraham
Republican

The incumbent is Republican Vance McAllister, who had represented the district since winning a special election in 2013. In early April 2014, following the release of a video that showed the married McAllister kissing a female staffer who was the wife of a friend, McAllister faced calls for him to resign, which he resisted. Though he initially said that he planned to run for re-election, on April 28, 2014, he announced that he would serve out his term and not run for re-election. However, he later changed his mind and ran for re-election. He did not survive the "top two" primary and was eliminated from the runoff election on December 6.

=== Candidates ===
==== Republican ====
Declared

- Ralph Abraham, Mangham physician
- Harris Brown, Monroe businessman and son of former State Senator William Denis Brown, III
- Zach Dasher, pharmaceutical representative and first cousin of the Robertson family
- Clyde C. Holloway, Public Service Commissioner, former U.S. Representative and candidate for the seat in 2013
- Vance McAllister, incumbent U.S. Representative
- Ed Tarpley, Alexandria lawyer and former Grant Parish District Attorney and candidate for Louisiana Attorney General in 1995

Withdrew

- Jeff Guerriero, attorney

Declined

- Rodney Alexander, former secretary of the Louisiana Department of Veterans Affairs and former U.S. Representative
- Charles "Bubba" Chaney, state representative
- Elbert Guillory, state senator
- Chris Hazel, state representative
- Frank A. Hoffmann, state representative
- Jay Morris, state representative and candidate for the seat in 2013
- Neil Riser, state senator and candidate for the seat in 2013
- Adam Terry, McAllister's chief of staff
- Mike Walsworth, state senator

==== Democratic ====
Declared

- Jamie Mayo, Mayor of Monroe and candidate for the seat in 2013

Declined

- Marcus Hunter, state representative and candidate for the seat in 2013
- Bob Johnson, state representative and candidate for the seat in 2013
- Jacques Roy, Mayor of Alexandria

==== Libertarian ====
Declared

- Charles Saucier

Withdrew

- Clay Grant, businessman and candidate for the seat in 2012

==== Green ====
Declared

- Eliot Barron, realtor, Red Cross volunteer and veteran

=== Jungle primary ===
==== Polling ====
Poll source	Date(s) administered	Sample size	Margin of error	Ralph Abraham (R)	Eliot Barron (G)	Harris Brown (R)	Zach Dasher (R)	Clay Grant (L)	Jeff Guerriero (R)	Clyde C. Holloway (R)	Jamie Mayo (D)	Vance McAllister (R)	Charles Saucier (L)	Ed Tarpley (R)	Other	Undecided
Glascock Group	October 2014	501	—	25%	2%	7%	15%	—	—	10%	18%	16%	2%	6%	—	—
Glascock Group	October 2014	—	—	20%	<1%	6%	11%	—	—	6%	18%	24%	<1%	2%	—	12%
Cygnal	September 22–24, 2014	504	± 4.36%	11%	—	5%	13%	—	—	8%	19%	17%	—	2%	3%	22%
JMC Analytics*	September 13, 2014	—	—	17%	—	—	—	—	—	—	22%	13%	—	—	—	—
Glascock Group	August 2014	466	—	22%	4%	11%	7%	—	4%	9%	15%	20%	2%	6%	—	—
Glascock Group	August 2014	519	—	18%	—	6%	14%	5%	—	—	21%	27%	—	9%	—	—

Hypothetical polling

Jungle primary with McAllister and Riser

Poll source	Date(s) administered	Sample size	Margin of error	Ralph Abraham (R)	Harris Brown (R)	Clay Grant (L)	Robert Johnson (D)	Jamie Mayo (D)	Vance McAllister (R)	Neil Riser (R)	Ed Tarpley (R)	Undecided
Glascock Group	June 2014	—	—	13%	2.8%	3.8%	8.5%	13.5%	26.1%	25.6%	6.8%	34.8%

Jungle primary without McAllister

Poll source	Date(s) administered	Sample size	Margin of error	Harris Brown (R)	Zach Dasher (R)	Clay Grant (L)	Robert Johnson (D)	Jamie Mayo (D)	Jay Morris (R)	Neil Riser (R)	Ed Tarpley (R)
Glascock Group	May 5–9, 2014	503	± ?	9%	8%	2%	9%	14%	6%	48%	5%

==== Results ====
Louisiana's 5th congressional district, 2014
Party	Candidate	Votes	%
Democratic	Jamie Mayo	67,611	28.2
Republican	Ralph Abraham	55,489	23.2
Republican	Zach Dasher	53,628	22.4
Republican	Vance McAllister (incumbent)	26,606	11.1
Republican	Clyde C. Holloway	17,877	7.5
Republican	Harris Brown	9,890	4.1
Republican	Ed Tarpley	4,594	1.9
Libertarian	Charles Saucier	2,201	0.9
Green	Eliot Barron	1,655	0.7
Total votes		239,551	100.0

=== Runoff ===
==== Polling ====
Hypothetical polling

Poll source	Date(s) administered	Sample size	Margin of error	Vance McAllister (R)	Neil Riser (R)	Undecided
Glascock Group	June 2014	?	± ?	49%	51%	—
Glascock Group	April 14, 2014	1,300	± ?	44%	56%	—

Poll source	Date(s) administered	Sample size	Margin of error	Vance McAllister (R)	Chris Hazel (R)	Undecided
Glascock Group	April 14, 2014	1,300	± ?	48%	52%	—

- * Internal poll for the Ralph Abraham campaign

Neither having received 50% in the primary, Mayo and Abraham will face each other in the runoff.

==== Predictions ====
Source	Ranking	As of
The Cook Political Report	Safe R	November 3, 2014
Rothenberg	Safe R	October 24, 2014
Sabato's Crystal Ball	Safe R	October 30, 2014
RCP	Safe R	November 2, 2014
Daily Kos Elections	Safe R	November 4, 2014

==== Results ====
Louisiana's 5th congressional district runoff, 2014
Party	Candidate	Votes	%
Republican	Ralph Abraham	134,616	64.2
Democratic	Jamie Mayo	75,006	35.8
Total votes		209,622	100.0
Republican hold			

== District 6 ==
2014 Louisiana's 6th congressional district election
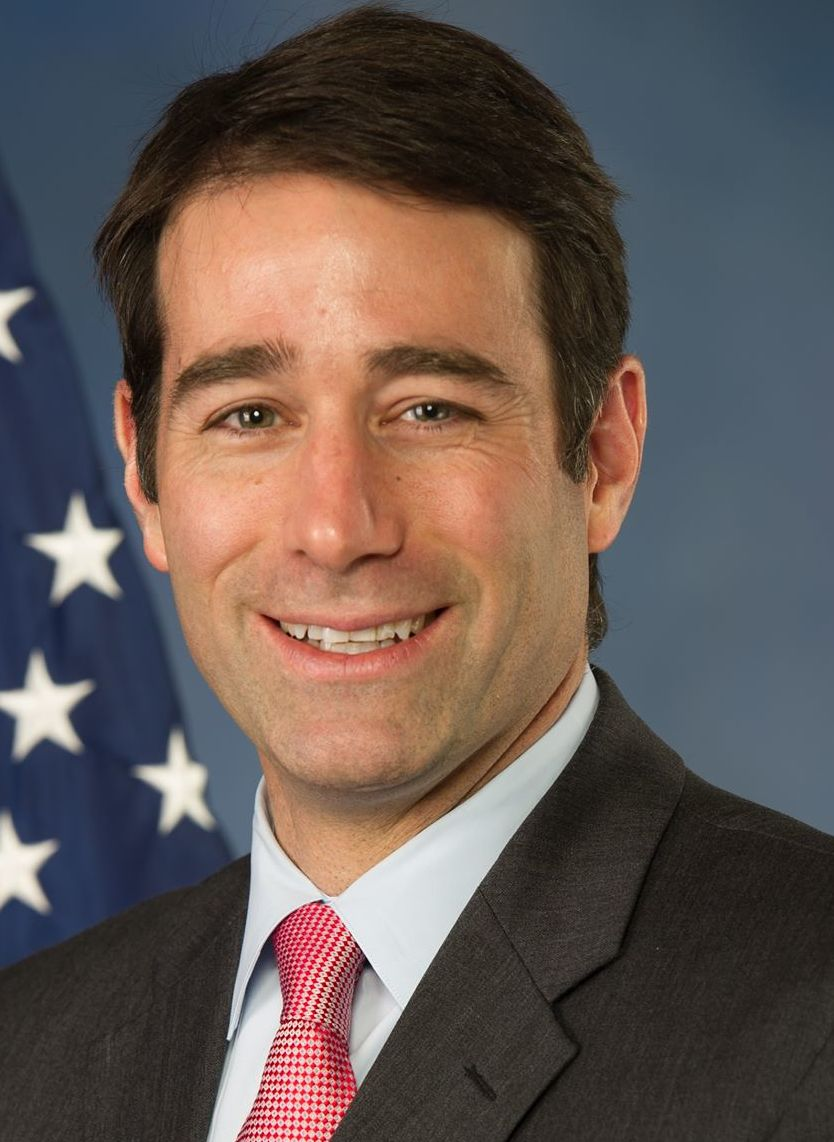

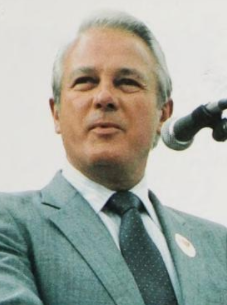

Candidate	Garret Graves	Edwin Edwards	Paul Dietzel
Party	Republican	Democratic	Republican
First round	70,715; 27.4%	77,866; 30.1%	35,024; 13.5%
Runoff	139,209; 62.4%	83,781; 37.6%	Eliminated
Candidate	Dan Claitor	Lenar Whitney
Party	Republican	Republican
First round	26,524; 10.3%	19,151; 7.4%
Runoff	Eliminated	Eliminated
- Graves: 30–40% 50–60% 60–70% 70–80% Edwards: 20–30% 30–40% 40–50% 50–60% 60–70% 70–80% Whitney: 30–40%
U.S. Representative before election
Bill Cassidy
Republican
Elected U.S. Representative
Garret Graves
Republican

Incumbent Republican Bill Cassidy, who had represented the 6th district since 2009, ran for the United States Senate seat then held by Mary Landrieu.

=== Candidates ===
==== Republican ====
Declared

- Bob Bell, Tea Party activist and retired U.S. Navy captain
- Dan Claitor, state senator
- Norm Clark, disabled veteran and Ph.D. candidate in LSU's political science program
- Paul Dietzel, businessman
- Garret Graves, former adviser to Governor Bobby Jindal
- Craig McCulloch, physical therapist and businessman
- Charles "Trey" Thomas, LSU Tigers football player
- Lenar Whitney, state representative

Withdrew

- Cassie Felder, attorney (endorsed Dan Claitor)

Declined

- Bill Cassidy, incumbent U.S. Representative (running for U.S. Senate)
- Hunter Greene, state representative
- Ryan Heck, Baton Rouge Metro Councilman
- Shelley Hendrix, autism awareness advocate
- Jeff Landry, former U.S. Representative (running for Attorney General of Louisiana in 2015)
- Erich Ponti, state representative
- Chas Roemer, president of the Louisiana Board of Elementary and Secondary Education

==== Democratic ====
Declared

- Edwin Edwards, former Governor of Louisiana and former U.S. Representative
- Richard Dean Lieberman, real estate broker
- Peter Williams

Declined

- Quentin Anderson, resource development campaign manager for the Capital Area United Way
- Ted James, state representative

==== Libertarian ====
Declared

- Rufus Holt Craig Jr., attorney, Democratic candidate for the seat in 2004 and Libertarian candidate for the seat in 2012

=== Jungle primary ===
==== Polling ====
Poll source	Date(s) administered	Sample size	Margin of error	Bob Bell (R)	Dan Claitor (R)	Paul Dietzel (R)	Edwin Edwards (D)	Cassie Felder (R)	Garret Graves (R)	Richard Lieberman (D)	Craig McCulloch (R)	Charles Thomas (R)	Lenar Whitney (R)	Other	Undecided
Jefferson Research (R-Whitney)	September 23–24, 2014	4,885	—	—	11%	14%	35%	1%	10%	2%	4%	1%	16%	6%	—
Glascock Group	September 2014	—	—	4%	19%	19%	32%	3%	7%	1%	2%	1%	11%	40%	
JMC Analytics (R-Dietzel)	July 26, 2014	576	±4.1%	—	9%	13%	35%	—	3%	—	—	—	—	40%	
Glascock Group	June 2014	687	±3%	—	16%	16%	32%	—	—	—	—	—	—	36%	
JMC Analytics	April 10–12, 2014	621	±3.9%	—	11%	11%	32%	2%	2%	—	1%	—	—	10%	30%
Glascock Group	March 2014	718	±3%	—	20%	19%	43%	4%	4%	2%	4%	3%	—	—	25%

==== Results ====
Louisiana's 6th congressional district, 2014
Party	Candidate	Votes	%
Democratic	Edwin Edwards	77,866	30.1
Republican	Garret Graves	70,715	27.4
Republican	Paul Dietzel	35,024	13.5
Republican	Dan Claitor	26,524	10.3
Republican	Lenar Whitney	19,151	7.4
Democratic	Richard Dean Lieberman	7,309	2.8
Republican	Craig McCulloch	5,815	2.2
Republican	Bob Bell	5,182	2.0
Democratic	Peter Williams	4,037	1.6
Libertarian	Rufus Holt Craig, Jr.	3,561	1.4
Republican	Norm Clark	1,848	0.7
Republican	Charles "Trey" Thomas	1,447	0.6
Total votes		254,918	100.0

=== Runoff ===
Poll source	Date(s) administered	Sample size	Margin of error	Garrett Graves (R)	Edwin Edwards (D)	Undecided
JMC Analytics	November 17, 2014	793	± 3.5%	61%	35%	4%
Glascock Group	March 2014	718	± 3%	53%	47%	—

Hypothetical polling

Poll source	Date(s) administered	Sample size	Margin of error	Dan Claitor (R)	Paul Dietzel (R)	Undecided
JMC Analytics	February 24–25, 2014	581	± 4.1%	17%	18%	65%

Poll source	Date(s) administered	Sample size	Margin of error	Dan Claitor (R)	Edwin Edwards (D)	Undecided
Glascock Group	September 2014	?	±?	59%	41%	—
Glascock Group	March 2014	718	± 3%	52.3%	47.7%	—

Poll source	Date(s) administered	Sample size	Margin of error	Paul Dietzel (R)	Edwin Edwards (D)	Undecided
Glascock Group	September 2014	?	±?	60%	40%	—
JMC Analytics	April 10–12, 2014	621	± 3.9%	48%	39%	13%
JMC Analytics	February 24–25, 2014	581	± 4.1%	43%	34%	23%

Poll source	Date(s) administered	Sample size	Margin of error	Lenar Whitney (R)	Edwin Edwards (D)	Undecided
Glascock Group	September 2014	?	±?	55%	45%	—

Neither having achieved 50% of the popular in the primary, Edwards and Graves contested in a runoff election.

==== Predictions ====
Source	Ranking	As of
The Cook Political Report	Safe R	November 3, 2014
Rothenberg	Safe R	October 24, 2014
Sabato's Crystal Ball	Safe R	October 30, 2014
RCP	Safe R	November 2, 2014
Daily Kos Elections	Safe R	November 4, 2014

==== Results ====
Louisiana's 6th congressional district runoff, 2014
Party	Candidate	Votes	%
Republican	Garret Graves	139,209	62.4
Democratic	Edwin Edwards	83,781	37.6
Total votes		222,990	100.0
Republican hold			

== See also ==
- 2014 United States House of Representatives elections
- 2014 United States elections
