= Weldon Russell =

American politician (born 1946)

Robert Weldon Russell III

Member of the Louisiana House of Representatives from the 72nd district
- In office 1984–1988
- Preceded by: Tyrus Cobb Lanier
- Succeeded by: Buster Guzzardo

Personal details
- Born: 1946 (age 79–80) Washington Parish, Louisiana, USA
- Party: Democratic
- Spouse: Mary Louise Furniss Russell (married 1974–2013, her death)
- Children: Blaine Lamar Russell (1979–1982) R. Weldon Russell, IV Bridget Russell Hebert
- Education: Amite High School Tulane University Southeastern Louisiana University
- Occupation: Realtor
- Website: weldonrussell.com

Robert Weldon Russell III, known as Weldon Russell (born 1946), is a Democrat and former member of the Louisiana House of Representatives who served from District 72 between 1984 and 1988 during the third administration of Governor Edwin Washington Edwards.

One of fourteen candidates in Louisiana's 5th congressional district special election held on October 19, 2013, Russell finished in eighth place with 2,554 votes (2 percent). He led only in his own Tangipahoa Parish and adjoining St. Helena.

== Background ==
Russell was born in Washington Parish, Louisiana, and graduated from Amite High School in Amite in Tangipahoa Parish. He attended Tulane University in New Orleans, from which he obtained an education degree and played on the Green Wave varsity football and track teams, He was a member of the United States Army Reserve Officer Training Corps. Russell also holds a Bachelor of Arts in Economics from Southeastern Louisiana University in Hammond. He is a former member of the Amite City Council.

Russell and his wife, the former Mary Louise Furniss (1953–2013), a native of Las Vegas, Nevada and herself a Realtor, had three children, Blaine Lamar Russell (1979–1982), R. Weldon Russell, IV, and Bridget Russell Hebert and her husband Eric. Mrs. Russell is interred at Amite Memorial Gardens. He is a Methodist.

== Political career ==
In the 1983 general election, Russell, with 55.6 percent of the vote, unseated Representative Tyrus Cobb Lanier. In the legislature, Russell pushed for passage of the Louisiana Child Protection Act, which he considers model legislation for other states to emulate. He was popular with environmental interest groups. In 1984 and 1984, he was honored by the Union of Police and Emergency Medical Technicians for his legislative work. One of his bills which became law requires all ambulances to be staffed by an EMT.

Representative Russell said that through the Louisiana Rural Caucus he helped to deliver crucial votes to pass legislation establishing the Audubon Aquarium of the Americas in New Orleans.

After one term, Russell, with 45 percent of the vote, was defeated for reelection in 1987 by his fellow Democrat, Buster Guzzardo, Sr. In 2003, Russell waged an unsuccessful campaign for the District 12 seat in the Louisiana State Senate, having finished with 14 percent of the vote. Victory instead went to his fellow Democrat, Ben Nevers of Bogalusa, who still holds the seat and is term-limited in 2016.

The congressional special election was called because Republican Rodney Alexander resigned effective September 26 to become the secretary of the Louisiana Department of Veterans Affairs. Russell said that he was inspired to enter the race by his grandchildren:

I can see the American Dream slipping away ... People are telling me they want to restore common sense and some degree of sanity. People are sick and tired of the noise. The country’s confused. We're overregulated and overtaxed, and people are just sick to their stomach because gridlock has become a political virus that has infected Washington.

Russell calls himself an "independent thinker", supports "Second Amendment gun rights", opposes abortion, and supports a centerpiece of the Barack Obama administration, the Patient Protection and Affordable Care Act.

The runoff election for the U.S. House seat was held on November 16; political newcomer Vance McAllister defeated State Senator Neil Riser of Columbia in Caldwell Parish to win the right to succeed Alexander for the remainder of the existing term. A Monroe-area businessman and a native of West Carroll Parish, McAllister carried the celebrity endorsement of Phil Robertson of the A&E Network reality show Duck Dynasty, which is filmed in West Monroe. In addition to Russell, three other Democrats and two major Republican candidates were eliminated from the race in the primary.

Political offices
Preceded by Tyrus Cobb Lanier	Louisiana State Representative from District 72 (Tangipahoa and St. Helena parishes); 1984–1988	Succeeded by Buster Guzzardo Sr.
