= Guzzardo =

Guzzardo (pronounced [ɡutˈtsardo]) is an Italian surname, a Sicilian variant of Gucciardo. Notable people with the surname include:

- Ayla Guzzardo, American basketball player and coach
- Buster Guzzardo (1923–2021), American politician

== See also ==
- Guicciardi
- Guzzardi
