= 2013 Louisiana's 5th congressional district special election =

- November 16, 2013
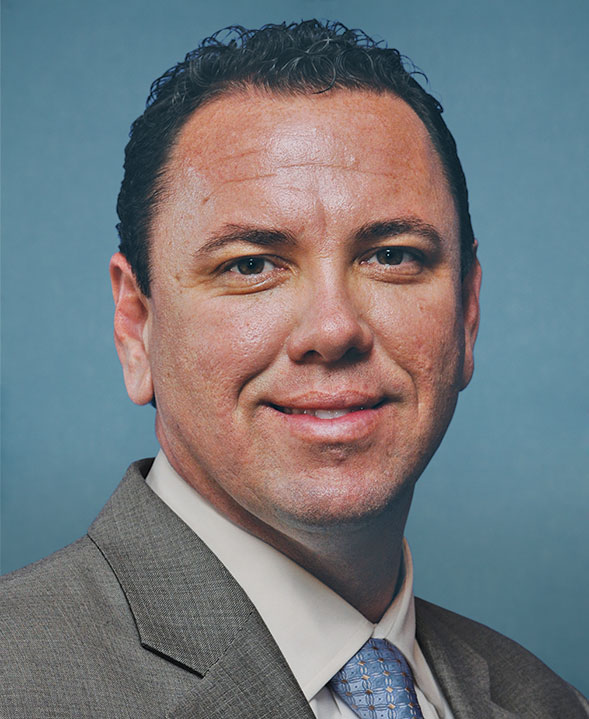

Nominee	Vance McAllister	Neil Riser
Party	Republican	Republican
Popular vote	54,449	36,837
Percentage	59.65%	40.35%
- Runoff parish results McAllister: 50–60% 60–70% 70–80% 80–90% Riser: 50–60% 60–70% 70–80%
U.S. Representative before election
Rodney Alexander
Republican
Elected U.S. Representative
Vance McAllister
Republican

A special election for Louisiana's 5th congressional district was held on November 16, 2013, to elect a member of the United States House of Representatives. Incumbent Republican Congressman Rodney Alexander resigned on September 26, 2013, to become the Secretary of the Louisiana Department of Veterans Affairs under Governor Bobby Jindal.

The primary election was held on October 19, 2013. Under Louisiana's jungle primary system, all candidates appear on the same ballot, regardless of party. As no candidate received 50 percent plus one vote during the primary election, the general election was held on November 16 between the top two candidates in the primary, Republicans Neil Riser, a state senator from Columbia in Caldwell Parish, and Vance McAllister, a businessman from Swartz. In the general election, McAllister handily defeated Riser to win the seat.

== Background ==
On August 6, 2013, Alexander announced that he would not seek a seventh term in the House in the 2014 congressional elections. He cited his weariness with partisanship in Washington, D.C., as the primary reason for his decision to retire. On August 7, Alexander moved up his timetable for departure from Congress. He resigned his seat effective September 26. Alexander joined the administration of Governor Bobby Jindal as the new secretary of the Louisiana Department of Veterans Affairs.

== Controversy ==
The day after Alexander announced his resignation, Republican state senator Neil Riser publicly declared his candidacy and launched his website. Within days, he had hired a campaign manager and started distributing campaign material. Riser's unusually fast response to the unexpected announcement of the special election led to charges of favoritism by Alexander and Governor Jindal. Specifically, that they colluded to declare Alexander's appointment to the State Cabinet in a surprise announcement and ensure a short filing period so as to benefit Riser, who, it was alleged, knew of Alexander's plans in advance.

Riser had filed documents with the Federal Election Commission to run in the special election the day before Alexander announced his resignation, although he claimed that this was a "clerical error" on the part of the FEC. Additionally, Riser had traveled through the district for several months with Alexander before the announcement and had been endorsed by every Republican congressman from Louisiana within days. An editorial by The Town Talk said: "If this feels a lot like someone has stolen your vote, well, let’s just say you’re not alone."

Republican state representative Jay Morris declared his candidacy and accused Alexander and Jindal of trying to "rig the election", adding that "it appears to me some sort of deal was made to grant an advantage to [Riser]. It disturbs me and should disturb everyone that an election could be manipulated like this." Democratic state senator Rick Gallot had considered joining the race but declined, citing the short time frame and unexpected nature of the announcement. When declaring his candidacy, Democrat Jamie Mayo, the mayor of Monroe, said that he assumed the allegations were true, "but I'm not doing to cry over spilled milk." Republican Public Service Commissioner and former Congressman Clyde C. Holloway said that his candidacy for the seat was motivated by suspicions that Alexander and Jindal wanted Riser to win, saying: "This thing stinks... I feel like we tried to have an appointed congressman by the governor and by Rodney... Without any doubt, I think they've been orchestrating this for months." The state's junior U.S. Senator, Republican David Vitter, declined to make an endorsement and said that "it's a very quick election. And it's obvious that didn't happen by accident." Attorney Ed Tarpley, who had considered running, said that "Everywhere I go without exception people are angry about what happened. [The short time frame means voters are] deprived of the normal election cycle."

The Jindal administration has responded that the election was not rigged, with press secretary Sean Lansing saying: "There is no truth to [the] claims." Timmy Teepell, who previously worked as a political consultant for Riser and as Jindal's Chief of Staff said: "It's a free country, and nobody is prevented from running. Is two weeks not enough time... to get to Baton Rouge to qualify to run next week?" Alexander said, "There was no deal", and Riser added, "I don’t think it was any secret that I wanted to eventually run for the seat. I've been clear the past two years about my intention to run." After Riser announced that he would run for Congress, Teepell and his Virginia-based On Message, Inc., assumed management of the campaign.

== Candidates ==
=== Republican Party ===
==== Declared ====
- Clyde C. Holloway, Public Service Commissioner and former U.S. Representative from Rapides Parish
- Vance McAllister, businessman
- Jay Morris, state representative
- Neil Riser, state senator
- Phillip "Blake" Weatherly, engineer

==== Declined ====
- Elbert Guillory, state senator
- Jeff Guerriero, attorney
- Jonathan Johnson, Alexander's State Director
- Willie Robertson, star of Duck Dynasty and CEO of Duck Commander
- Ed Tarpley, Alexandria attorney; Grant Parish district attorney from 1991 to 1997
- Adam Terry, Alexander's Chief of Staff
- Mike Walsworth, state senator
- Bob Webber, Ouachita Parish School Superintendent

==== Endorsements ====
Vance McAllister
- Phil Robertson, founder and President of Duck Commander and star of Duck Dynasty
- Willie Robertson, CEO of Duck Commander and star of Duck Dynasty
- Jamie Mayo, Democratic Mayor of Monroe and third-place candidate in the primary
- Clyde C. Holloway, Republican Public Service Commissioner and fourth-place candidate in the primary
Neil Riser

Politicians

- Rodney Alexander, outgoing U.S. Representative
- Charles Boustany, U.S. Representative
- Eric Cantor, House Majority Leader and U.S. Representative from Virginia
- John Fleming, U.S. Representative
- Steve Scalise, U.S. Representative
- Mike Walsworth, state senator

Organizations

- FreedomWorks
- The Tea Party of Louisiana

=== Democratic Party ===
==== Declared ====
- Marcus Hunter, state representative
- Robert Johnson, state representative
- Jamie Mayo, Mayor of Monroe
- Weldon Russell, former state representative

==== Declined ====
- Rick Gallot, state senator
- Katrina Jackson, state representative
- Charles Kincade, attorney
- Jacques Roy, Mayor of Alexandria

=== Libertarian Party ===
==== Declared ====
- Henry Herford Jr., farmer and former chairman of the Louisiana Republican State Convention
- Samir B. A. Zaitoon, life insurance agent

=== Others ===
==== Declared ====
- Eliot Barron (Green), realtor
- Tom Gibbs (Independent), oil and gas land owner
- Peter Williams (Independent), tree farmer

== Jungle primary ==
=== Polling ===
Other polls that were not made public showed that Riser was a "lock" to make the runoff with Holloway "consistently" polling in second place. Morris, McAllister and Mayo also had the potential to make the runoff, with McAllister seen as the most likely to benefit from a slip in support for Holloway.

Poll source	Date(s) administered	Sample size	Margin of error	Jeff Guerriero (R)	Marcus Hunter (D)	Robert Johnson (D)	Jamie Mayo (D)	Jay Morris (R)	Neil Riser (R)	Undecided
JMC Enterprises	August 16, 2013	755	± 3.6%	5%	5%	11%	11%	10%	29%	29%

=== Results ===
Primary parish results Riser: 70–80%; 60–70%; 50–60%; 40–50%; 30–40%; 20–30%; McAllister: 20–30%; 60–70%; Mayo: 30–40%; 40–50%; 50–60%; Holloway: 30–40%; Johnson: 20–30%; 60–70%; Russell: 20–30%

Louisiana's 5th congressional district special election jungle primary
Party	Candidate	Votes	%
Republican	Neil Riser	33,045	31.97%
Republican	Vance McAllister	18,386	17.79%
Democratic	Jamie Mayo	15,317	14.82%
Republican	Clyde C. Holloway	11,250	10.88%
Democratic	Robert Johnson	9,971	9.65%
Republican	Jay Morris	7,083	6.85%
Democratic	Marcus Hunter	3,088	2.99%
Democratic	Weldon Russell	2,554	2.47%
Libertarian	Henry Herford, Jr.	886	0.86%
Republican	Phillip "Blake" Weatherly	517	0.5%
Green	Eliot Barron	492	0.48%
Independent	Peter Williams	335	0.32%
Independent	Tom Gibbs	324	0.31%
Libertarian	Samir B. A. Zaitoon	129	0.12%
Total votes		103,337	100%
Turnout			21.5%

== General election ==
=== Candidates ===
- Vance McAllister, businessman (Republican)
- Neil Riser, funeral home owner and state senator (Republican)

=== Campaign ===
Riser was the heavy favorite to win and McAllister was thought to have little chance of pulling off an upset. Riser raised and spent more money than McAllister, who largely self-financed his campaign. While Riser was backed by both the Republican establishment and the Tea Party, McAllister boasted endorsements from the stars of the television show Duck Dynasty. During the campaign, McAllister ran to Riser's left, particularly on the Patient Protection and Affordable Care Act. Riser spoke only of repealing the law whereas McAllister argued that with a Democratic majority in the Senate, repeal had no chance of success and that the two parties should work together to improve the law. He also emphasized his support for two of its key components: the Medicaid expansion and preventing insurance companies from denying coverage to people with pre-existing conditions. Riser campaigned on his experience and his opposition to President Obama. McAllister campaigned as a pragmatic outsider and won over voters who were frustrated with Congress and politicians in general.

=== Results ===
Louisiana's 5th congressional district special election, 2013
Party	Candidate	Votes	%	±%
Republican	Vance McAllister	54,450	59.65%	N/A
Republican	Neil Riser	36,840	40.35%	N/A
Total votes		'91,286'	'100.0%'	N/A
Turnout			18.9%	
Republican hold				
