= Dietzel =

Dietzel is a surname. Notable people with the surname include:

- Paul Dietzel (1924–2013), American football player, coach and college athletics administrator
- Paul Dietzel (businessman) (born 1986), American businessman
- Roy Dietzel (1931–2018), American baseball player
- Wilhelm Dietzel (born 1948), German politician

== See also ==
- Dietel
