= Guicciardi =

Guicciardi (pronounced [ɡwitˈtʃardi]) is an Italian surname from Modena. Notable people with the name include:

- Enrico Guicciardi (1812–1895), Italian colonel and politician
- Julie Guicciardi (1784–1856), Austrian noblewoman and student of Ludwig van Beethoven
- Giovanni Guicciardi (1819–1883), Italian opera singer

== See also ==
- Guicciardini
- Gucciardo
- Guzzardi, Guzzardo
