= Ted Vogt =

Arizona lawyer and politician (born 1973)

Director of the Arizona Department of Gaming
- In office February 11, 2019 – February 21, 2023

Executive Director of the Arizona Corporation Commission
- In office January 3, 2017 – July 5, 2018

Director of the Arizona Department of Veterans' Services
- In office July 1, 2013 – January 5, 2015
- Preceded by: Joey Strickland
- Succeeded by: Wanda Wright

Member of the Arizona House of Representatives from the 30th district
- In office March 16, 2010 – January 14, 2013
- Preceded by: Frank Antenori
- Succeeded by: Stefanie Mach

Personal details
- Born: February 20, 1973 (age 53) Council Bluffs, Iowa
- Party: Republican
- Education: Yale University (B.A.); University of Arizona (J.D.)
- Profession: Attorney at law
- Awards: Joint Commendation Medal; Air Force Commendation Medal (2 oak leaf clusters); Afghanistan Campaign Medal; Headquarters Air Force badge

Military service
- Branch/service: United States Air Force
- Years of service: 2000–2006
- Rank: Captain
- Battles/wars: Operation Enduring Freedom; Operation Iraqi Freedom

Janson Theodore "Ted" Vogt (born February 20, 1973) is a former Arizona State Representative and director of the Arizona Department of Gaming. Prior to his appointment as Gaming director by Governor of Arizona Doug Ducey in 2019, Vogt served as the executive director of the Arizona Corporation Commission. Before that, he served as Governor Doug Ducey's chief of operations, and later as the director of legislative and regulatory affairs for Traversant Group. Vogt briefly served as interim director of Arizona State Parks and Trails in 2018.

On June 11, 2013, Governor Janice K. Brewer appointed Vogt to be the director of the Arizona Department of Veterans' Services. He assumed office on July 1, 2013, and was confirmed unanimously by the Arizona State Senate on January 30, 2014.

== Biography ==
Vogt was born in Council Bluffs, Iowa and raised in Salt Lake City, Utah, when his family moved there in 1974. He was an Eagle Scout. He graduated from Judge Memorial Catholic High School in 1991 and received a B.A. in History from Yale University in 1995. He was a substitute teacher for a short time in Salt Lake City. From 1995 until he entered the United States Air Force in 2000, Vogt spent time chiefly in the private sector as an investment banker in the New York metropolitan area, advertising executive at Leo Burnett in Chicago, (beginning during the 1996 U.S. presidential election) executive assistant to then-former U.S. Secretary of Defense Donald H. Rumsfeld, and at night a member of The Second City comedy troupe (1997–2000).

From 2000 until 2006, Vogt was an intelligence officer in the United States Air Force. After the attacks of September 11, 2001, he served in Afghanistan in support of Operation Enduring Freedom, and throughout the greater Middle East in support of Operation Iraqi Freedom. In 2006, Vogt was stationed at the Pentagon where he was a daily intelligence briefer for both the Secretary of the Air Force and Chief of Staff of the Air Force. Leaving active duty in 2006, Vogt moved to Tucson and entered law school at the University of Arizona's James E. Rogers College of Law.

While in law school, Vogt remained involved in Homeland and National Security matters. During the summer of 2008, he worked on Homeland Security issues at the White House for the Office of Vice President Cheney. In 2009, Vogt clerked for United States Senator Jon Kyl on the Senate Judiciary's Subcommittee on Terrorism and Homeland Security in Washington, D.C., as well as for the Criminal Division within the United States Attorney's Office in Tucson.

Vogt was appointed to the Arizona Legislature during his final semester at Rogers College of Law. Controversy erupted when Vogt, who had been selected by his classmates to serve as one of their graduation speakers prior to his appointment to the Legislature, voted for the controversial anti-illegal immigration bill Senate Bill 1070 (S.B. 1070). Some classmates wanted him to step down as their class speaker, while most supported his right to speak. Ultimately, Vogt chose to speak at the graduation ceremony, while nearly 20 students walked out on his speech, returning at the conclusion of his remarks.

Vogt was awarded his J.D. in 2010. He passed the bar later that year, and entered private practice in Tucson, Arizona.

== Legislative career ==
He was first appointed to the Arizona House of Representatives on March 16, 2010, by the Pima County Board of Supervisors to fill the vacancy created when then-State Representative Frank Antenori was appointed to the Arizona State Senate to fill the seat vacated by State Senator Jonathan Paton who resigned to run for Congress in Arizona's 8th congressional district. Vogt won election to the Legislature on November 2, 2010. In the 50th Legislature, Vogt served as the Chairman of the House Ethics Committee; Vice Chairman of the Ways and Means Committee; and Member of both the House Judiciary Committee and the Higher Education, Innovation and Reform Committee.

Vogt is a member of the American Legislative Exchange Council (ALEC), a national group of conservative state legislators who meet to network with one another and to understand concerns of business. The group also drafts model legislation, some of which has been then introduced in state legislatures.

In 2011, Vogt sponsored major legislation granting all honorably discharged veterans automatic in-state tuition at all three of Arizona's state universities, as well as all community colleges. Governor Jan Brewer signed the bill into law on April 12, 2011, and the law became effective July 2011. Vogt also sponsored legislation to help combat human smuggling in Arizona. House Bill 2405 was also signed by Governor Brewer and became effective in July 2011.

In 2012, he was a prime sponsor of several bills. One of them, (HB2395) sought to reduce copper theft.

In 2012, he was an unsuccessful candidate for re-election from the newly drawn 10th district.
