= David LaCerte =

American lawyer and government official (born 1979)

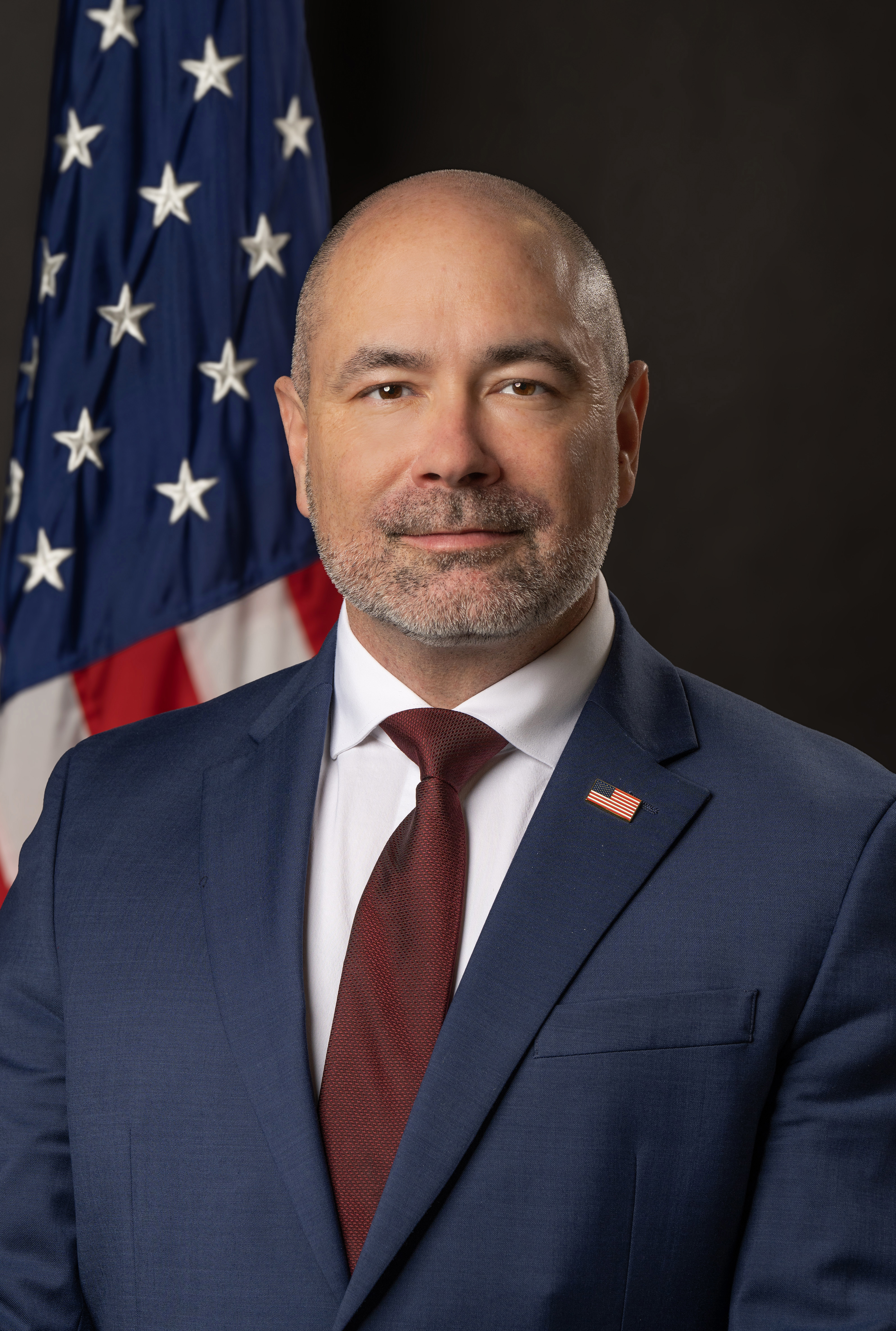

Member of the Federal Energy Regulatory Commission
- Incumbent
- Assumed office October 27, 2025
- President: Donald Trump
- Preceded by: Willie L. Phillips

Secretary of the Louisiana Department of Veterans Affairs
- In office June 2014 – October 2015
- Governor: Bobby Jindal
- Preceded by: Rodney Alexander
- Succeeded by: Joey Strickland
- Acting; January 2, 2013 – September 2013
- Governor: Bobby Jindal
- Preceded by: Lane Carson
- Succeeded by: Rodney Alexander

Personal details
- Born: David Alan LaCerte; November 6, 1979 (age 46) Louisiana, U.S.
- Party: Republican
- Education: Nicholls State University; Paul M. Hebert Law Center
- Occupation: Lawyer

Military service
- Branch/service: United States Marine Corps
- Unit: 1st Battalion, 1st Marines
- Battles/wars: War in Afghanistan

David Alan LaCerte (born November 6, 1979) is currently a member of the Federal Energy Regulatory Commission. He was previously the White House Liaison and Senior Advisor to the Director for U.S. Office of Personnel Management (OPM). LaCerte previously served as an appointee of President Donald Trump as a senior advisor at OPM from 2020-2021.

Prior to LaCerte's second stint at OPM, he served as Special Counsel at Baker Botts.

In January 2021, he was appointed as a Senior Advisor and Executive Counsel at the U.S. Chemical Safety and Hazard Investigation Board and served as Acting Managing Director.

LaCerte was the Secretary of the Louisiana Department of Veterans Affairs (LDVA) in the administration of Governor Bobby Jindal. He had been the Interim Secretary from January 2013 to September 2013.

On July 17, 2025, he was nominated by President Donald Trump to FERC for a term that ends June 30, 2026. He was confirmed en bloc on a party-line vote in October, 2025.

== Military career ==
LaCerte served in the United States Marine Corps Infantry at 1st Battalion 1st Marines (1/1). Shortly after the September 11 attacks in 2001, he was deployed to Afghanistan under the command of General James Mattis. LaCerte led over 100 combat patrols and missions in Afghanistan and Pakistan and served on interrogation teams for high value Al Qaeda targets.

== Louisiana Department of Veterans Affairs ==
LaCerte is a graduate of Nicholls State University and Paul M. Hebert Law Center. He joined the LDVA in 2010 as Deputy Secretary and Executive Counsel under Secretary Lane Carson. Following the retirement of Carson, LaCerte served as the Interim Secretary of LDVA until the appointment of former US Representative Rodney Alexander in September 2013. LaCerte was appointed by Governor Bobby Jindal as Secretary after Alexander resigned on June 3, 2014.

Under the leadership of Secretary LaCerte, LDVA experienced a historic period of financial reforms, becoming the first state to transition completely from state appropriations in the Veteran Homes program, expanding Parish Service Offices to every parish in the state and doubling Louisiana's VA Disability Payments to over $1 billion, and building three additional state veterans' cemeteries at Fort Polk, Slidell, and Rayville.

LaCerte was the first chairman of the Louisiana Military Advisory Council, tasked with reinforcing the state's military footprint in the face of potentially devastating cuts of thousands of soldiers and family members at Fort Polk. Due to the efforts of the LMAC and LaCerte as chairman, Fort Polk escaped major cuts which would have been catastrophic to the local and state economies.

LDVA also sponsored and passed legislation in many areas, including benefits reform, military spouse occupational license reciprocity, and some of the early Veterans Treatment Courts in the nation.

LaCerte resigned in October 2015 amid two investigations into his office, prompted by a report, released in August 2015, that turned up concerns about conditions and lack of oversight at nursing homes for veterans. The investigations by the Louisiana legislative auditor and the State Inspector General's Office found possible misspending of funds and failure to report alleged violence against a veteran.

LaCerte famously called the report "garbage" and sued the state, the legislative auditor, and the Inspector General for defamation.

== Office of Personnel Management ==
In June 2020, LaCerte left the private practice of law as a partner at the Louisiana law firm of Sternberg Naccari and White and was appointed by the White House as a senior advisor at the Office of Personnel Management where he served in policy and as a special counsel in the administration of the President.
