= Guzzardi =

Guzzardi (pronounced [ɡutˈtsardi]) is an Italian surname from Sicily. Notable people with the surname include:

- Bob Guzzardi (born 1944), American businessman and political activist
- Giuseppe Guzzardi (1845–1914), Italian painter
- Lucia Guzzardi (born 1927), Italian actress
- Mike Guzzardi, American guitarist
- Will Guzzardi, American politician

== See also ==
- Guicciardi, Gucciardo
- Guzzardo
