= Dietel Park =

Historical park in Sosnowiec, Poland

- Park Dietla
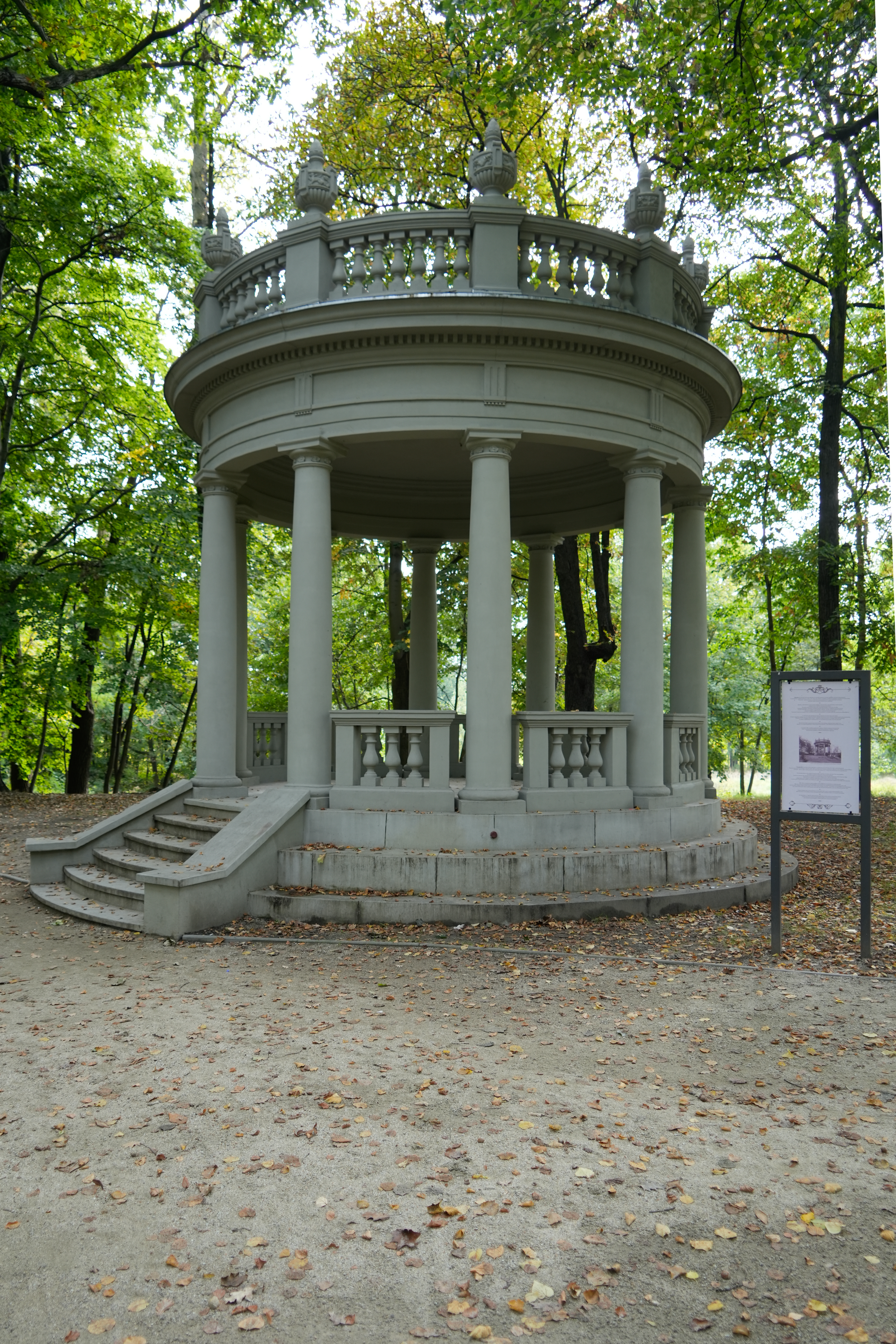
- The Gloriette in Dietel Park
- Interactive map of Dietel Park
- Location: Sosnowiec, Poland
- Coordinates: 50.28528°N 19.13639°E
- Area: 6.13 ha (15.1 acres)
- Established: 1901
- Designer: Ernst Robert Pietsche, Fritz Hanishem
- Designation: Registered historical monument (A/1702/98)

Dietel Park (Polish: Park Dietla), also colloquially known as "Żeromski Park" (Polish: Park Żeromskiego), is a historic municipal park in Sosnowiec, Poland, covering an area of 6.13 hectares. It is located on Stefana Żeromskiego Street in the Pogoń district. The park was established in 1901 by Heinrich Dietel, in the Neo-Romantic style, as a complement to the private buildings that were part of his estate. Together with the Dietel Palace and surrounding buildings, it is a listed historical monument.

== History ==
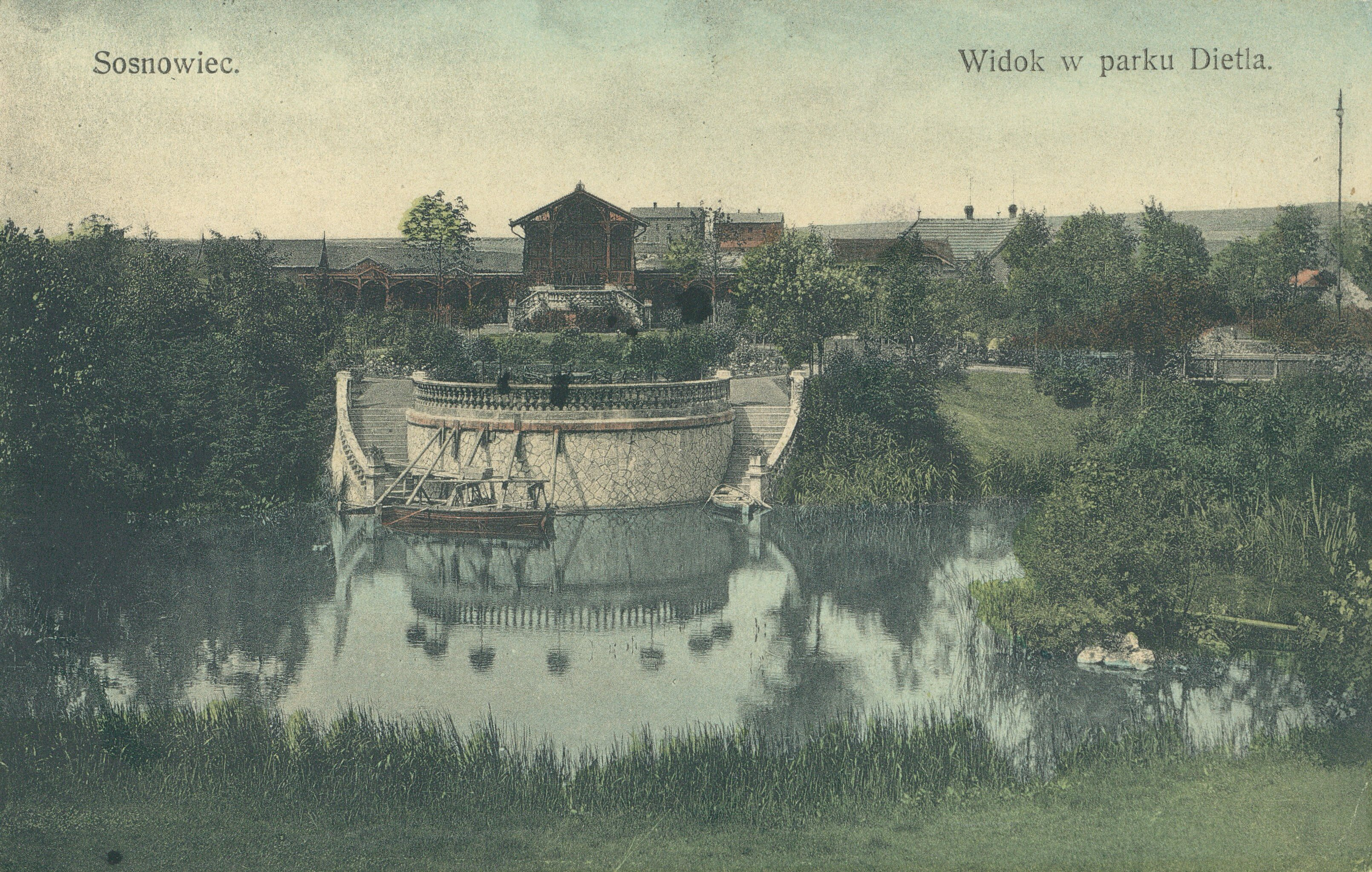
Dietel Park in 1912.

The park was created in 1901 in the village of Nowy Sosnowiec, initiated by the local industrialist, Heinrich Dietel. He hired the German gardener Ernst Robert Pietsche and the architect Fritz Hanishem for its design and construction. The project was carried out on land adjacent to the palace, which was previously an agricultural field. A pond was deepened, its banks were leveled and planted with aquatic vegetation. On boulders in the middle of the pond, a statue of Neptune with a trident was placed. A viewing terrace with a balustrade was created in the western part of the park. Artificial depressions, grottoes, and ravines were created, with walking paths winding through them. On a hill, artificial ruins were built in the style of a knight's castle, which contained tools, weapons, and murals referencing knightly art. Near the ruins a gloriette was constructed in a neoclassical style. In the central part of the park, a Temple of Sibyl, also known as the "Temple of Contemplation", was erected on a stone elevation surrounded by a small terrace. The temple was a brick structure with plaster, and a decorative portico with a mythological scene over the entrance, supported by four columns. The building was topped with a dome crowned by a figure of a Sibyl. A carefully designed plant composition with two fountains in the middle was created in front of it. The park was enclosed by a wall with two gates. In 1903, it was expanded with a vegetable garden and recreational area for horse riding. It served the Dietl family until their departure from Sosnowiec during World War II.

In 1945, the park became a publicly accessible municipal park. Over time, the surrounding walls were demolished, and the park and its structures deteriorated. The Temple of Sibyl, which housed a café in the 1950s, was demolished around 1970. A significant part of the park was transformed due to the construction of new city sports facilities. In 1972, a sports and entertainment hall was opened, followed by an indoor swimming pool in 1977. The only structure that has survived in almost unchanged form to this day is the gloriette, which underwent a major renovation in 2022 and regained its pre-war appearance.

On December 31, 1998, the Neo-Romantic park of Heinrich Dietl, along with the buildings associated with the former palace, was listed as a historical monument. Following a resolution by the Sosnowiec City Council on September 24, 2009, it was officially named "Dietel Park."

== Vegetation ==
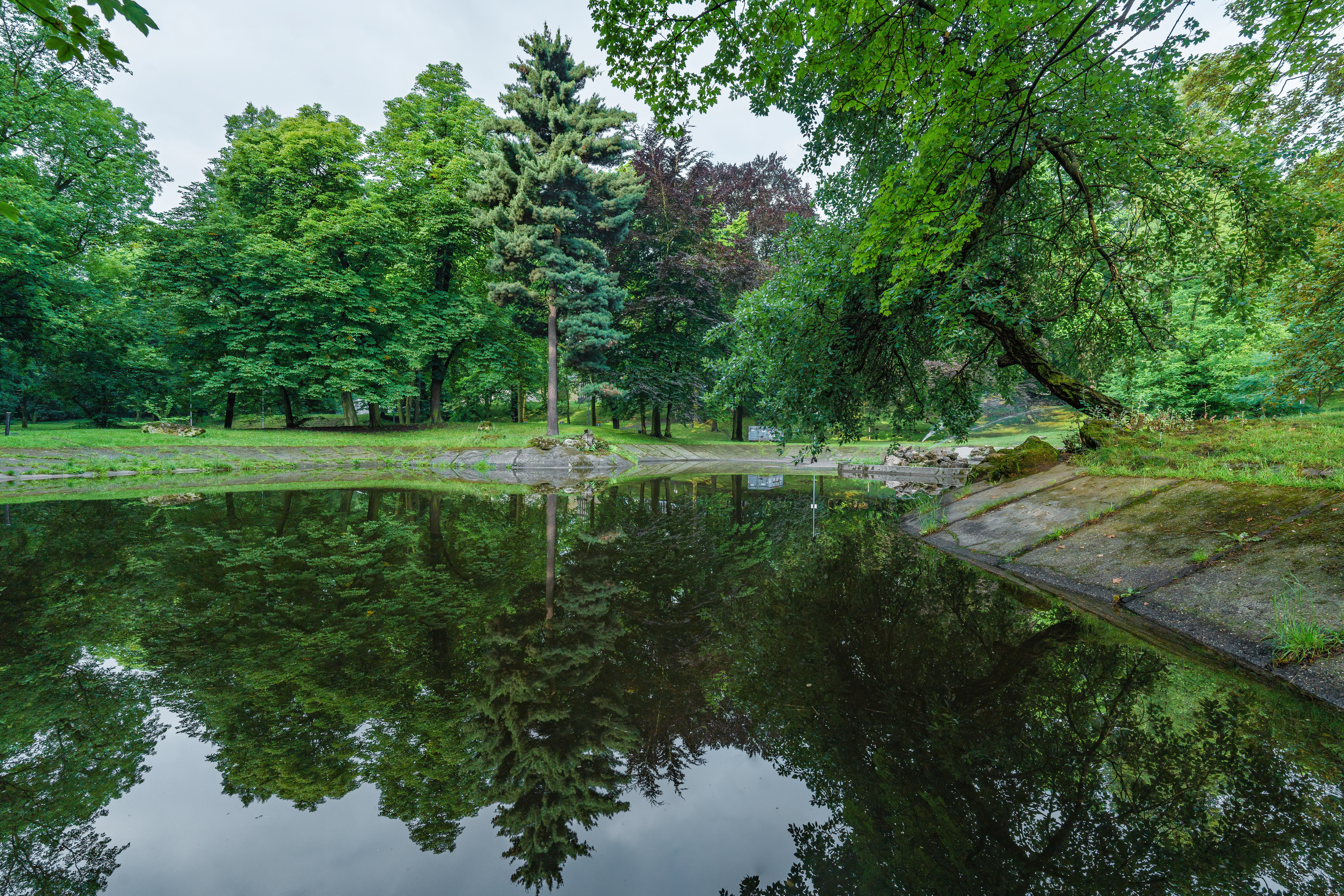
Pond with the 'Amber Lady' (Pinus peuce) in the background.

The park features approximately 60 species of trees and shrubs, the oldest of which are around 110 years old. Among them are rare specimens such as the two-colored beech, Paper birch, and Silver lime. There are also several massive trees, including a Silver maple, 6 London plane trees, an American basswood, Northern red oak, Large-leaved linden, Bur oak, Norway maple, and European ash. One of the more unique trees in the park is a Macedonian pine growing by the edge of the pond.

== See also ==
- Dietel Palace
