= Dietel =

Dietel is a surname. Notable people with the surname include:

- Andreas Dietel (born 1959), German speed skater
- Heinrich Gotthold Dietel (1839–1911), German textile industry entrepreneur
- Johann Ludwig Dietel, transcriber of the Dietel manuscript
- Paul Dietel (1860–1947), German mycologist

== See also ==
- Dietel Palace, a neo-baroque palace in Sosnowiec, Poland
- Dietl
