= St. John Evangelical Church (Sosnowiec) =

Historic church from 1886 in Sosnowiec, Poland

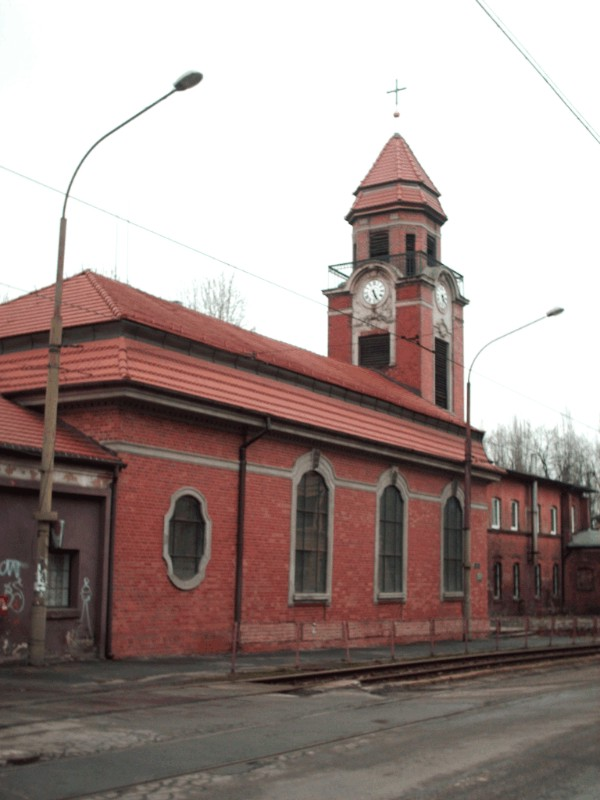
St. John Evangelical Church

Evangelical church St. John in Sosnowiec, Poland – parish church of the Evangelical-Augsburg parish in Sosnowiec, located at ul. Stefan Żeromski 1.

== History ==
Built on the initiative of Heinrich Dietel, based on the factory hall of cotton spinning factory in 1880, adapted for worship services in 1886, then expanded according to Ignatz Grünfeld's design of the tower in 1888, which was raised from 1909 to 1910. The building took on an eclectic form with elements of neobarok. There are two commemorative plaques on the church dated 8 November 1880, which refers to the construction of a factory hall (or the first Lutheran service in the Lutheran church service), and an informant, mistakenly saying that the church was built in the mid-nineteenth century.
