= Lane Carson =

American politician

Lane Anderson Carson

Secretary of the Louisiana Department of Veterans Affairs
- In office 2008–2013
- Preceded by: Hunt Downer
- Succeeded by: David LaCerte (interim)

Louisiana State Representative for District 99 (Orleans Parish)
- In office 1976–1983
- Preceded by: Orleans Parish districts not numbered until 1976
- Succeeded by: Garey Forster

Personal details
- Born: August 21, 1947 (age 79) New Orleans, Orleans Parish; Louisiana, USA
- Party: Republican (1977- current, Democratic Party USA (before 1977)
- Spouse: Laura Carson
- Children: Christopher Carson; Rebecca C. Parks
- Education: Louisiana State University; Tulane University Law School
- Occupation: Attorney
- Military career
- Allegiance: United States of America
- Branch: United States Army
- Conflicts: Vietnam War

Lane Anderson Carson (born August 21, 1947, in New Orleans, Louisiana, USA) is a licensed building contractor, real estate broker, and attorney in private practice who resides in Covington, the parish seat of St. Tammany Parish.

== Career ==
Carson was 1st Platoon Leader, A Company, 1/11 Infantry, 5th Mech Infantry Division during the Vietnam War. He was wounded in operation Dewey Canyon II (Lam Son 719), discharged and returned home. He received the Purple Heart, Vietnam Campaign Medal, Vietnam Service Medal and Combat Infantryman Badge.

Preceded by At-large membership	Louisiana State Representative for District 98 (French Quarter and Orleans Parish); Lane Anderson Carson; 1976–1982	Succeeded by Garey Forster
