= Orthodox Church of the Holy Virgin, Hope, Luby and their mother Zofia (Sosnowiec) =

Orthodox church in Sosnowiec, Poland

Coordinates: 50°16′50″N 19°07′40″E

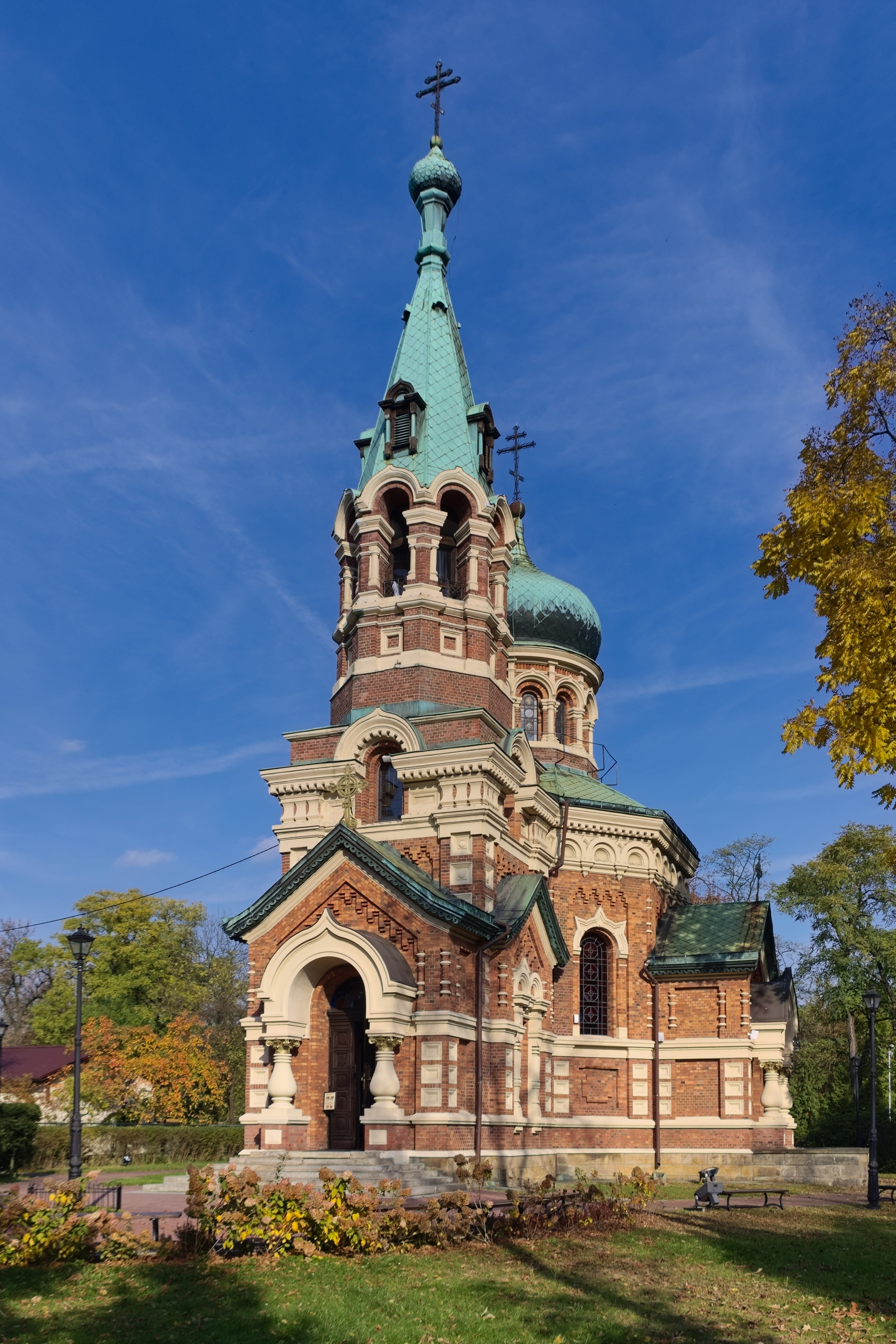
Orthodox Church of the Holy Virgin, Hope, Luby and their mother Zofia

The Orthodox Church of Sts. Vera, Hope, Loy and the mother of their Zofia (Saints Faith, Hope and Love) in Sosnowiec – the only one existing of the three Orthodox Orthodox churches in Sosnowiec. It is located at Jan Kilinski Street 39. It is a parish church. It is part of the Deaconate of the Diocese of Lodz-Poznan Polish Autocephalous Orthodox Church.

== History ==
The idea of construction first appeared in 1887. A contribution was made by the Sosnowiec and Lodz industrialists – people so deserved for the development of Sosnowiec such as Schoen, Heinrich Dietel, Gamper, Kunitzy and others. – mostly evangelicals or the Jews, who cared for good relations with the Russian government. The building plot was received free of charge from the Warsaw-Vienna Railway. On August 15, 1888 the cornerstone was laid, and on November 28 the following year, the temple was consecrated by the Bishop of Lublin Flawiana. The patrons of the new church were: Vera, Nadezhda and Liubov, daughters of Sts. Sophia, martyrs of Hadrian's time. Construction went very quickly, which reflected on the quality of the building. Primary priests from neighboring parishes in Maczki, Olkusz and Częstochowa served, but already in April 1890 the new church received the first parish priest – Joanna Wasiliewicz Lewicki (from Calvary in Podlasie). May 16, 1890 Archbishop of Warsaw and Chełm – Leoncius confirmed the creation of an independent parish at the Orthodox Church of Saints Vera, Nadjeżdy, Ljub'wi and their mother Zofia, to which belonged Będzin County, the staff of the local border guard and customs officials. Next to it was a parish house – the seat of the clergyman and a separate house for the church governor. Today the Orthodox Church belongs to the parishes of Saints Vera, Hope, Luby and their mother Zofia in Sosnowiec in the diocese of Lodz-Poznan. The parish (as one of the two Orthodox institutions in the Silesian province) covers the southern part of the voivodeship, among others. Katowice agglomeration, Bielsko-Biała, Rybnik. The current pastor is Fr. Mitrat Sergiusz Dziewiatowski. March 16, 2014 in the temple – for the first time in its history – priesthood was celebrated.

== Architecture ==
Built of bricks and stone, the church consists of five parts. In the center there is an octagon, which on one side supports the tower, and on the other the presbytery. The central part of the temple covers the dome, which is visible only from the inside, because the whole is covered with an onion helmet. Entrance to the Orthodox church is a frontage in the shape of a pile of ridge, based on two, pearly columns separated from the wall, creating the impression of "bilayer". The interior of the building, in contrast to its appearance, carries the signs of the word literality – it is clear, made in classicist style. The Oak Iconostasis (pronounced 4,7 × 7 m), which was created by the Muscovite artist Liebediew, and the founders of the Schöen brothers, also possesses signs of Western influences – particularly in the iconic style. Czestochowa Icon of Our Lady (placed in the left hand side of the altar) is a gift from railway workers from Częstochowa. From 2017 in the church there is a patron saint icon, written on Athos (which contains the relics of the Holy Faith, Hope, Love and Mother of their Sophia, brought in the 1980s from Rome to the Sosnowiec temple). The church was entered in the register of monuments on October 10, 1980 under number A-1242/80.
