= Arizona Department of Veterans' Services =

State agency

Agency overview
- Formed: 1925; 101 years ago (Cabinet rank 1999)
- Preceding agency: Arizona Veterans' Commission
- Jurisdiction: State of Arizona
- Headquarters: 3839 North 3rd Street, Suite 209, Phoenix, Arizona (Maricopa County), U.S.A.
- Agency executive: John Scott, Director of Veterans' Services
- Website: dvs.az.gov

The Arizona Department of Veterans' Services is a department of the Arizona government that focuses on veteran's services.

== History ==
Arizona has provided services to veterans from Arizona since 1925, six years after the First World War, when it created the position of a solitary Veterans' Service Officer. In the midst of the Korean War in 1951, the position was abolished and replaced by the Arizona Veterans' Service Commission. Another two decades later, near the ending of the Vietnam War in 1972, the commission was integrated into the Arizona Department of Economic Security along with several other Arizona state agencies. Primarily at the request of various veterans' organizations, the then governor of Arizona Bruce Babbitt reestablished the commission as a separate agency in 1982. The commission consisted of five members appointed to three-year terms by the governor, as well as an executive officer appointed by the commission.

In 1999, the Arizona State Legislature separated the commission from the former level of an agency by reorganizing and making the commission as an advisory body and creating a separate state Arizona Department of Veterans' Services. It is a state-funded agency led by a governor-appointed director with a headquarters in the state capital of Phoenix, and is considered a full executive branch department and part of the governor's cabinet.

== Department services ==
The Arizona Department of Veterans' Services provides direct services to veterans through the administration of 19 Veterans Benefits Offices throughout the state to help American military veterans connect with their United States V.A. benefits, two skilled nursing Veteran Home facilities in Phoenix and Tucson to provide short and long-term care, one Veterans' Memorial Cemetery in Sierra Vista (Cochise County), with additional cemeteries in Northern Arizona and Maran. A fiduciary may provide conservator and guardian services for incapacitated veterans.

In addition, the A.D.V.S. provides critical, state-wide coordination and technical assistance to services and organizations serving veterans. This includes activities such as coordinating services across private and public sectors in serving targeted populations such as Veterans experiencing homelessness and Women Veterans, as well as building community capacity to address Veteran employment and higher education.

Services provided by the state Veterans' Services Department were instrumental in connecting Arizona's nearly 600,000 military veterans with nearly $2,712,810,000 (2.7 million) dollars in further Compensation, Pension, Educational and Medical benefits and grants from the United States Department of Veterans Affairs in Washington, D.C. in fiscal year FY 2012.

== Leadership ==
- Patrick Chorpenning, 1st Director of Veterans Services, (1999–2007)
- Richard Gregg Maxon, Brigadier General (U.S. Army, ret.), 2nd Director of Veterans' Services, (2007–2008)
- Joey Strickland, Colonel (U.S. Army, ret.), 3rd Director of Veterans Services, (2008–2013)
- Ted Vogt, 4th Director of Veterans' Services, (2013–2015)
- Wanda Wright, Colonel (U.S. Air Force, ret.), 5th Director of Veterans' Services, (2015–2023).
- John Scott, Director of Veterans' Services, (2025– ).
