= Dietl =

Dietl is a surname. Notable people with the surname include:

- Bo Dietl (born 1950), American police detective, media personality and 2017 NYC mayoral candidate
- Eduard Dietl (1890–1944), German general
- Helmut Dietl (1944–2015), German film director and writer
- Jaroslav Dietl (1929–1985), Czechoslovak scenarist of series
- Józef Dietl (1804–1878), mayor of Kraków

== See also ==
- Dietel
