= Buster Guzzardo =

American politician (1923–2021)

Member of the Louisiana House of Representatives from the 72nd district
- In office 1987–1996
- Preceded by: Weldon Russell
- Succeeded by: Robby Carter

Personal details
- Born: Sebastian John Guzzardo; March 25, 1923 Tangipahoa Parish, Louisiana, U.S.
- Died: November 26, 2021 (aged 98) Independence, Louisiana, U.S.
- Party: Democratic
- Spouse: Sara Marie Campo
- Children: 6

Sebastian John Guzzardo Sr. (March 25, 1923 – November 26, 2021), known as Buster Guzzardo, was an American politician from the state of Louisiana. He served in the Louisiana House of Representatives from the 72nd district from 1987 to 1996. He was a veteran of World War II, serving in the United States Army as a military police officer from 1943 to 1945. In 1996, Guzzardo was indicted on 11 federal charges of obstructing law enforcement, extortion, conspiracy, conducting an illegal gambling business, aiding racketeering and mail fraud relating to a video poker investigation. He later served 21 months in prison.
