= Dietel Palace =

- Pałac Dietla
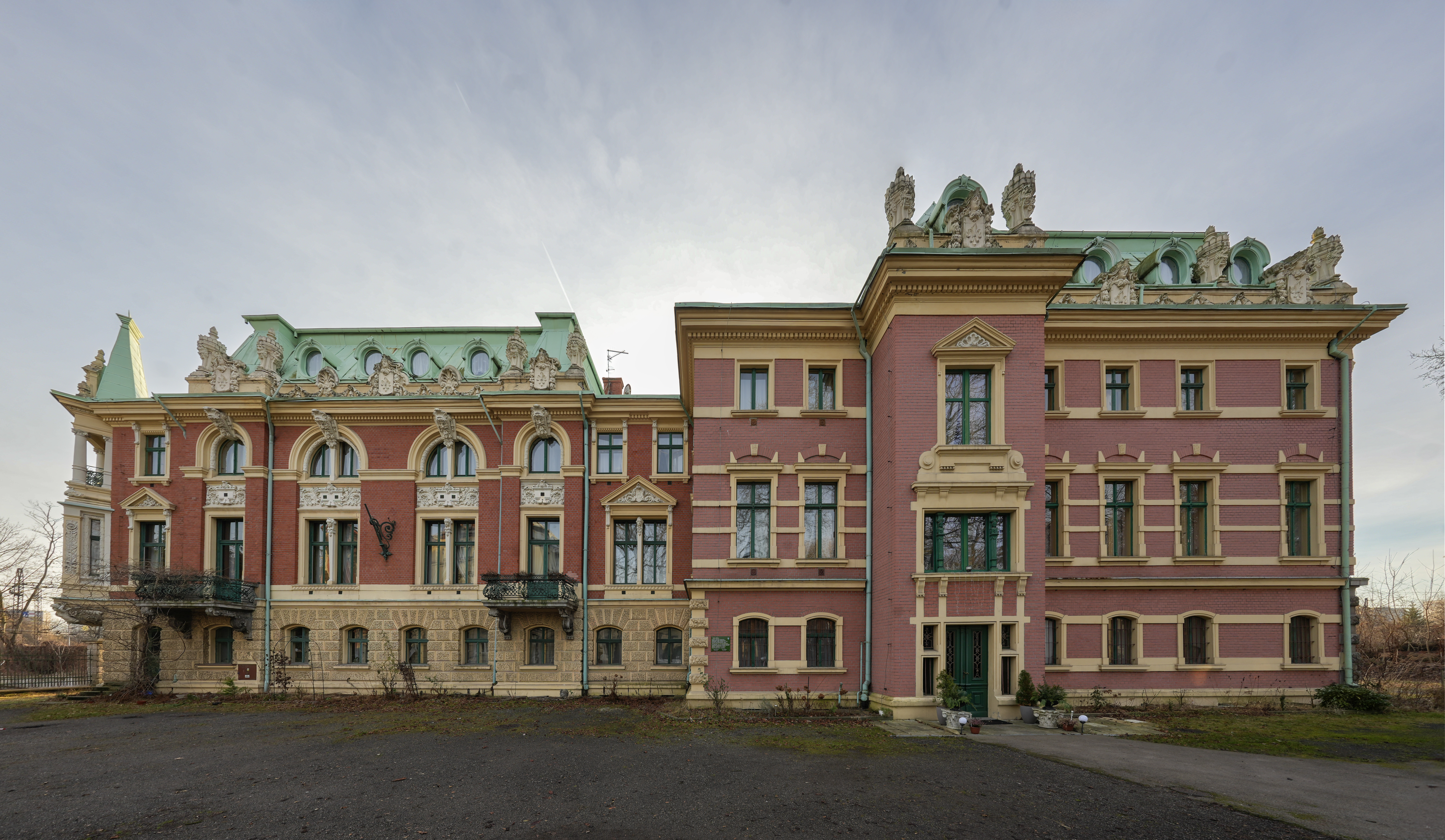
- Interactive map of the Dietel Palace area

General information
- Architectural style: Baroque Revival architecture
- Location: S. Żeromskiego 2, Sosnowiec, Poland
- Coordinates: 50°17′07″N 19°08′18″E
- Completed: 1900

Website
- http://palacdietla.pl

Dietel Palace (Polish: Pałac Dietla) is a neo-baroque palace built for Heinrich Dietel, located in Sosnowiec (Poland).

== Architecture ==
The palace consists of two parts: narrower north and broader the south. Facades are made of brick, with details made of plaster and artificial stone. The building is covered with mansard roofs.

== Interiors ==
The interiors of the palace have retained some of the original equipment and decor, which makes the property a particularly valuable monument. The representative rooms are located on the first floor. These are:

- Ballroom : the two-storey ballroom is in the style of Louis XV. Walls decorate with mirrors and stucco. A small balcony was located in the western wall.
- Neobarock dining room : the second largest in the palace, is also called a Dutch room or couch room. In the dining room there is an oak wood paneling with the sideboards in it. An additional decoration is the panels with decorations referring to the Dutch painting of Delft.
- Neo-Roman pipe room : decorated with paneling with plant and animal motifs in which the cabinets and the seat have been integrated. Additional room decoration is two stained glass windows.
- The Art Nouveau Cabinet : connected to the dining room through a massive sliding door. The ceiling is decorated with stucco decoration.
- Bathroom : rich bathroom facilities have remained almost unchanged. This exclusive palace bathroom "played" among others. In the film Between the mouth and the shores of the cup.

== History ==
The first plans of the building were created in the 1880s and signed by Waligórski. The final project was created in 1890. Around the year 1900, with the completion of the palace, a parked walled premise, with a conservatory and elements of small architecture, was created. The palace was part of the patronage team, including the park, the former factory, the workers' settlement, and the evangelical church. As a Dietel family residence, the palace functioned until 1945. In January of that year it was occupied by the Soviet NKVD commanding the city for its needs. At that time, many parts of the palace and equipment were destroyed. Until 1997 the seat of the School of Music. Since 1997 the building has been privately owned. Since the same year renovation work has begun. From 2016 it is possible to explore the facility, rent halls for banquets with accommodations.
