= Joey Strickland =

American military officer

- Born: Arkansas, U.S.
- Military career
- Allegiance: United States
- Branch: United States Army
- Unit: Louisiana State Guard
- Awards: Legion of Merit; Meritorious Service Medal (with 4 bronze oak leaf clusters); Army Commendation Medal (2); Air Medal (3)

Joey Strickland is an American military officer. He retired from the Army after 29 years, and became Director of the Arizona Department of Veterans' Services, then became Veterans Affairs Secretary for the state of Louisiana.

== Childhood ==
Strickland is a Choctaw-Cherokee. He graduated from high school in 1966 and went directly into the Army.

== Career ==
Strickland served 28.9 years in the U.S. Army, including two combat tours of duty in Vietnam. In 1994, he retired as a Lieutenant Colonel and was later appointed Colonel in the Louisiana State Guard by Governor Mike Foster, while serving on the Governor's Military Advisory Board.

Strickland was Director of the Louisiana Governor's Office of Indian Affairs from January 1996 to August 2004.

He was executive director of Veterans Affairs in Louisiana.

He was president of the National Association of State Directors of Veterans Affairs from 2003 to 2004.

=== Arizona Department of Veterans' Services ===
Strickland was appointed director of the Arizona Department of Veterans' Services by Janet Napolitano in July 2008. He served until April 2013. Strickland was asked to resign by Governor Jan Brewer, and the forced resignation caused an uproar amongst state veterans, who held Strickland in high regard. Under Strickland, the Department built a new veterans home in Tucson and renovated the one in Phoenix.

=== Louisiana Department of Veterans Affairs ===
Strickland served as Chairman of the Veterans Affairs Advisory Committee for Minority Veterans and as President of the National Association of State Directors of Veterans Affairs (NASDVA) from 2003-2004. As NASDVA President, he testified on behalf of Veterans issues before the U.S. Congress. Governor John Bel Edwards appointed him Secretary of the Louisiana Department of Veterans Affairs on Jan. 13, 2016.

As Veterans Affairs Secretary, he is responsible for overseeing five Veterans Homes, four State Veterans Cemeteries, the department's Parish Service Offices, the Administrative, Contact Assistance, and Claims Divisions, the Military Family Assistance Fund, the Veterans Honor Medal Program, and outreach initiatives for Veterans Service Organizations, homeless, incarcerated and female veterans. Strickland served for more than 15 years as either Director or Deputy Secretary in two states; Louisiana and Arizona.

== Awards ==
His awards include the Legion of Merit, Meritorious Service Medal with 4 Bronze Oak Leaf Clusters, Army Commendation Medal (2nd award), Air Medal (3rd award), Vietnam Campaign Medal, Vietnam Service Medal with 7 battle stars, Airborne Medal and Overseas Ribbon.

== Personal life ==
Strickland married Leila Hiestand Strickland. They are the parents of three sons and twin daughters.
