= Heinrich Gotthold Dietel =

Heinrich Gotthold Dietel (March 15, 1839 - June 24, 1911) was a German textile industry entrepreneur, with one of the largest contributions to Sosnowiec development.

He was born in Greiz as a son of Heinrich Gottlob Dietl, owner of spinning mills at Wilkau, and Johann Wilhelmina Merbold. He traveled to the United States to examine the techniques of industrial wool production as well as conducting business. Together with his father and brothers he ran a factory in Wilkau near Zwickau in Saxony. He also practiced in Bohemia and Württemberg.

In 1877 he began his studies at the Technical University of Dresden. On June 11, 1878 he married Julia Jacob in Leipzig. The same year he arrived in Sosnowiec with his wife as a result of the customs reform carried out a year earlier. On land purchased from Gustav von Kramsty (Pogoń), he immediately proceeded to build the first Polish spinning mill in Russian ruled Poland. He had five sons: Heinrich Georg, Henryk, Borys, Alfred, Roman and Boguslav. With the enlargement of the family, a new residence, the Dietel Palace, was built from 1890 to 1900. Heinrich Gotthold Dietel died in Sosnowiec, where he was buried in a mausoleum at the Evangelical Cemetery.

== Charity activity ==
- 1882: founding the evangelical cantor's school
- 1880: founding evangelical church in Sosnowiec
- 1886: foundation of Evangelical church in Sosnowiec-Pogoń
- 1887: co-founder of the Church of the Holy Vera, Hope, Loy and the mother of their Sophia
- 1889: co-financing the construction of the Alexandria School
- 1894: foundation of the Realschule
- 1895–1898: foundation of the Realschule
- 1901: co-founder of the church of St. Nicholas the Miracle at Sosnowie
