= Vance McAllister =

American businessman and politician (born 1974)

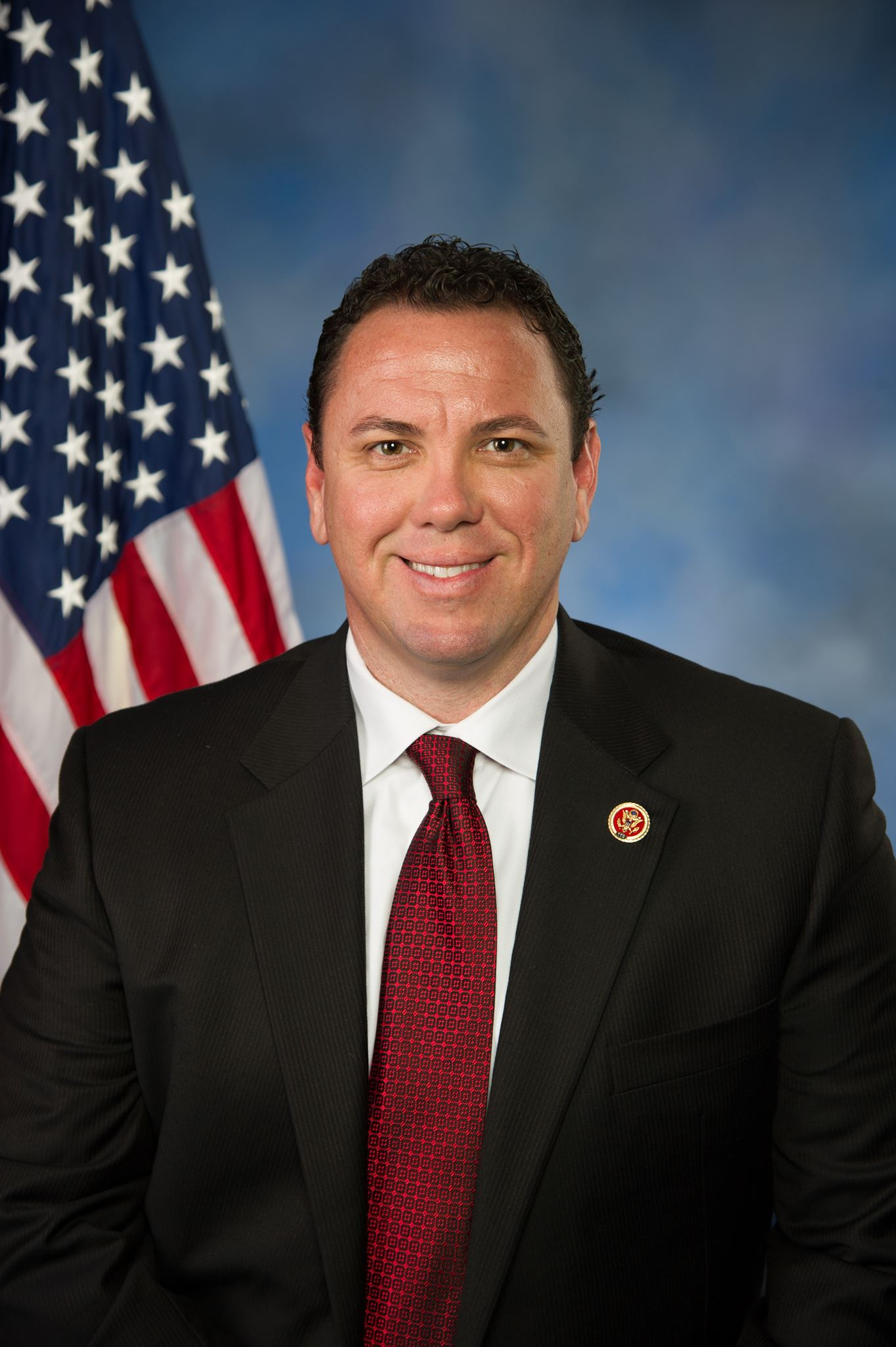
- Official portrait, 2013

Member of the U.S. House of Representatives from Louisiana's 5th district
- In office November 16, 2013 – January 3, 2015 (Note: McAllister's official service begins on the date of the special election, while he was not sworn in until November 21, 2013.)
- Preceded by: Rodney Alexander
- Succeeded by: Ralph Abraham

Personal details
- Born: Vance Michael McAllister Sr. January 7, 1974 (age 52) Oak Grove, Louisiana, U.S.
- Party: Republican
- Spouses: Kelly Duncan (m. 1997; div. 2022) Madlena McAllister (m. 2022)
- Children: 5
- Education: University of Louisiana, Monroe
- McAllister's voice Recorded July 9, 2014

Vance Michael McAllister Sr. (born January 7, 1974) is an American businessman and Republican former member of the United States House of Representatives from Louisiana's 5th congressional district. He won a special runoff election held on November 16, 2013, for the seat vacated by fellow Republican Rodney Alexander.

On April 8, 2014, the day after information about an affair was posted, McAllister said that he planned to run for re-election. On April 28, 2014, he announced that he would serve out his term and not run for re-election. However, he later changed his mind and ran for re-election, for a full term. He did not survive the "top two" primary, receiving 11.1 percent of the vote, and so was not in the runoff election on December 6.

== Early life and career ==
McAllister was born in Oak Grove, Louisiana, and graduated from Forest High School in 1992. He attended the University of Louisiana at Monroe, served in the United States Army from 1992 to 1994, and later served in the Louisiana National Guard. Before entering Congress, he worked in the private sector and owned and co-owned several small businesses in northeast Louisiana.

== U.S. House of Representatives ==
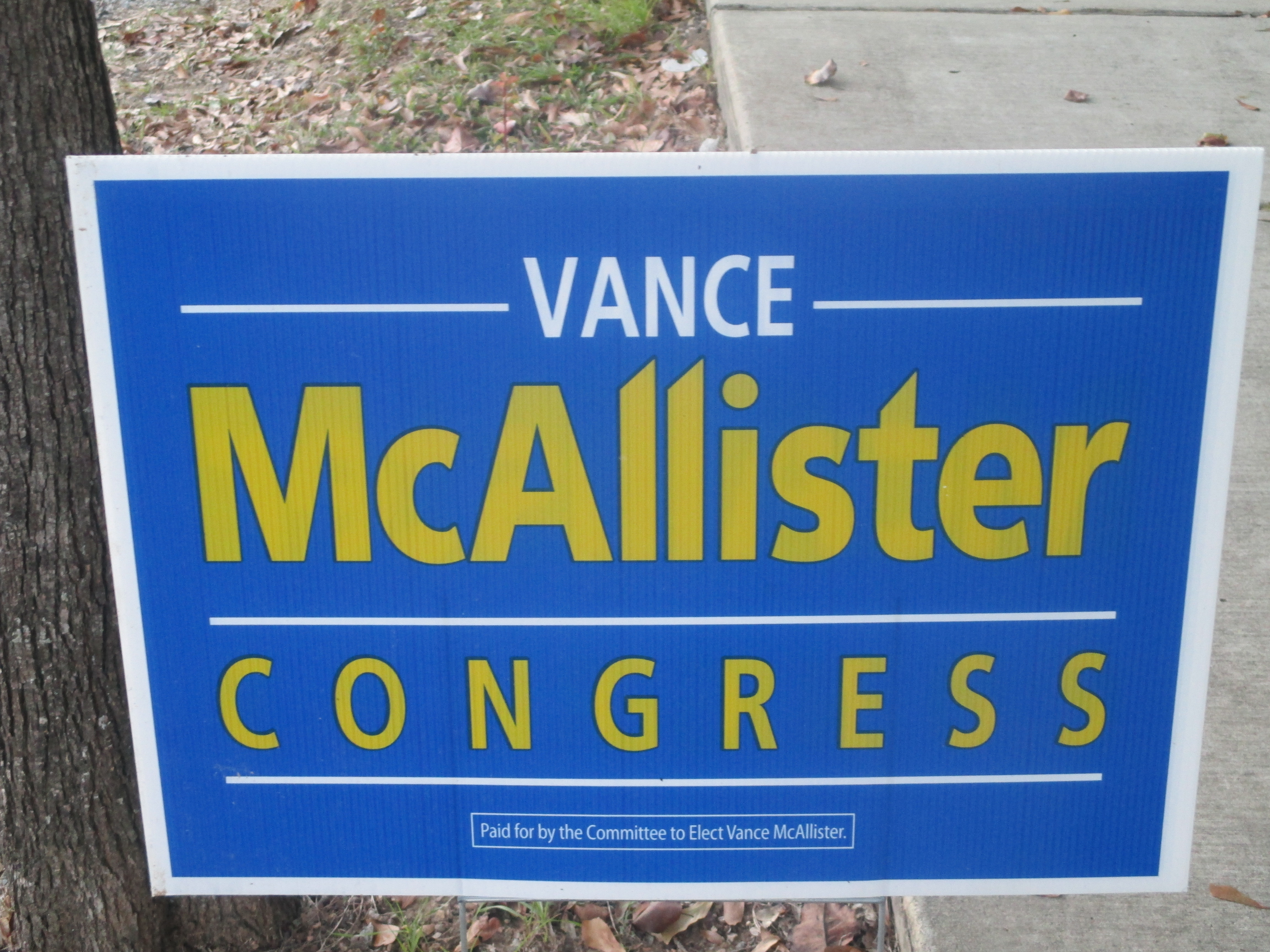
McAllister campaign sign

=== Elections ===
==== 2013 special ====
In the November 16, 2013 runoff, McAllister defeated State Senator Neil Riser, 59.7% (54,449) to 40.3% (36,837). National coverage noted his endorsements from “Duck Dynasty” figures Phil and Willie Robertson and framed the outcome as a surprise over the GOP establishment favorite.

==== 2014 ====
McAllister sought a full term in 2014 but did not advance out of the November 4 primary after Republican Ralph Abraham and Democrat Jamie Mayo moved on to the December 6 runoff. Certified results show McAllister received 11.11% (26,606).

=== Tenure ===
In June 2014, the non-profit watchdog Citizens for Responsibility and Ethics in Washington requested that the Department of Justice and House Ethics Committee investigate a published statement from McAllister that an unnamed colleague had told him he would receive a $1,200 contribution from The Heritage Foundation for voting against a measure related to the Bureau of Land Management. McAllister responded that he had not received a donation, which he ascribed to the group being "upset" with him after revelations of his extramarital affair with a staffer. He also said that he had not cast the vote with the expectation of receiving money, but had revealed what was said to him to show how "money controls Washington" and how work in Congress is a "steady cycle of voting for fundraising and money instead of voting for what is right." A spokesman for The Heritage Foundation stated: "we would never do anything like that... we do not [make political donations]. The Heritage Foundation is a think tank and does research and education, but does not get involved with political bills at all."

=== Committee assignments ===
- Committee on Agriculture
- Committee on Natural Resources

=== Later political activity ===
In 2015 McAllister ran for the Louisiana State Senate in District 33, challenging incumbent Mike Walsworth. Walsworth won the October 24 blanket primary, 62.3% to 37.7%.

== Personal life ==
=== Extramarital encounter ===
On April 7, 2014, the Ouachita Citizen newspaper of West Monroe, posted online a copy of a surveillance video from an anonymous source which showed McAllister kissing a staff member in his Monroe district office. The video was recorded in McAllister's Monroe congressional office on December 23, 2013. McAllister's aide Leah Gordon was alleged to have leaked the video to the Ouachita Citizen. Both aides resigned in 2014. Melissa Anne Hixon Peacock was subsequently identified as a married, longtime employee of McAllister.

McAllister made a statement concerning the video: "There's no doubt I've fallen short and I'm asking for forgiveness. I'm asking for forgiveness from God, my wife, my kids, my staff, and my constituents who elected me to serve". Former opponent Republican State Senator Neil Riser said, "I think right now we should be mindful and sensitive to the families who are involved." McAllister's chief of staff, Adam Terry, said that the staff member was fired by the congressman.

The Hill, a Washington, D.C. newspaper, reported on April 9, 2014, that Louisiana Republican Party chairman Roger F. Villere Jr. called for McAllister to resign. One day later Louisiana Governor Bobby Jindal issued a similar demand, as did Hammond's Daily Star, a politically nonaligned newspaper editorially.

McAllister found himself being defended by Representative Cedric Richmond, the sole Democrat in Louisiana's U.S. House delegation. Richmond described McAllister's situation as one of the "gotcha moments" in which the political parties have "taken joy in the pain of their supposed opponents". U.S. Representative Bill Cassidy (R–Baton Rouge) urged respect for the McAllister family's privacy and cited the Golden Rule (Matthew 7:12).

== 2017 arrest warrant ==
On September 27, 2017, a Louisiana judge issued a warrant for McAllister's arrest after he failed to appear for a debt hearing. McAllister had failed previously to appear for other debt hearings and it is claimed he owes $296,000 to one bank and $250,000 to another. McAllister told local media the warrant stemmed from a misunderstanding with his attorney about a debt-collection hearing date.

== See also ==
- List of federal political sex scandals in the United States

U.S. House of Representatives
Preceded by Rodney Alexander	Member of the U.S. House of Representatives from Louisiana's 5th congressional district 2013–2015	Succeeded by Ralph Abraham
U.S. order of precedence (ceremonial)
Preceded by Don Cazayoux as Former U.S. Representative	Order of precedence of the United States as Former U.S. Representative	Succeeded by Brenda Jones as Former U.S. Representative
