= Mike Walsworth =

American politician (born 1956)

Member of the Louisiana State Senate from the 33rd district
- In office January 14, 2008 – January 13, 2020
- Preceded by: Robert J. Barham
- Succeeded by: Stewart Cathey Jr.

Member of the Louisiana House of Representatives from the 15th district
- In office January 8, 1996 – January 14, 2008
- Preceded by: Charles Anding
- Succeeded by: Frank Hoffmann

Personal details
- Born: March 27, 1956 (age 70)
- Party: Republican
- Spouse: Dawne Smith Walsworth
- Children: 5
- Education: Northeast Louisiana University (B.A.)
- Occupation: Real estate investor, warehouse manager

Michael A. Walsworth (born March 27, 1956) is a Republican politician from Louisiana who served as a member of the Louisiana State Senate from the 33rd district from 2008 to 2020 and as a member of the Louisiana House of Representatives from the 15th district from 1996 to 2008.

== Early life ==
Walsworth was born in 1956. He graduated from West Monroe High School, and from the Northeast Louisiana University with his bachelor's degree. Walsworth worked at the Ouachita Coca-Cola Bottling Company plant.

== Louisiana House of Representatives ==
In 1995, Walsworth ran for the Louisiana House of Representatives in the 15th district, challenging incumbent Democratic State Representative Charles Anding for re-election. He defeated Anding, winning 55 percent of the vote to Anding's 45 percent. Walsworth ran for re-election in 1999, and was challenged by Ouachita Parish Police Jury member Royce Calhoun. He defeated Calhoun in a landslide, winning re-election with 67 percent of the vote. He was re-elected unopposed in 2003.

== Louisiana Senate ==
Walsworth was unable to seek re-election to the State House in 2007 because of term limits, and instead opted to run for the Louisiana Senate from the 33rd district, which included Claiborne, Morehouse, Ouachita, Union, and West Carroll parishes. He ran against fellow State Representative Charles McDonald, a Democrat. Walsworth ultimately defeated McDonald by a narrow margin, winning 52–48 percent. He was re-elected unopposed in 2011.

In 2015, Walsworth ran for re-election to a third term, and he was challenged by former Congressman Vance McAllister. He defeated McAllister in a landslide, winning re-election with 62 percent of the vote.

== 2019 Clerk of Court campaign ==
In 2019, Walsworth was term-limited and unable to run for re-election to the State Senate. He considered running for the State House, but ultimately declined to do so, and instead ran for Ouachita Parish Clerk of Court. He ran against Deputy Clerk Dana Benson, who campaigned as an independent, and Republican LaKeisha Johnson. Walsworth placed first in the primary, winning 48 percent of the vote, and advanced to a runoff with Benson, who placed second with 36 percent. Benson narrowly defeated Walsworth, winning 51 percent of the vote to his 49 percent.
