= Rodney Alexander =

American politician (born 1946)

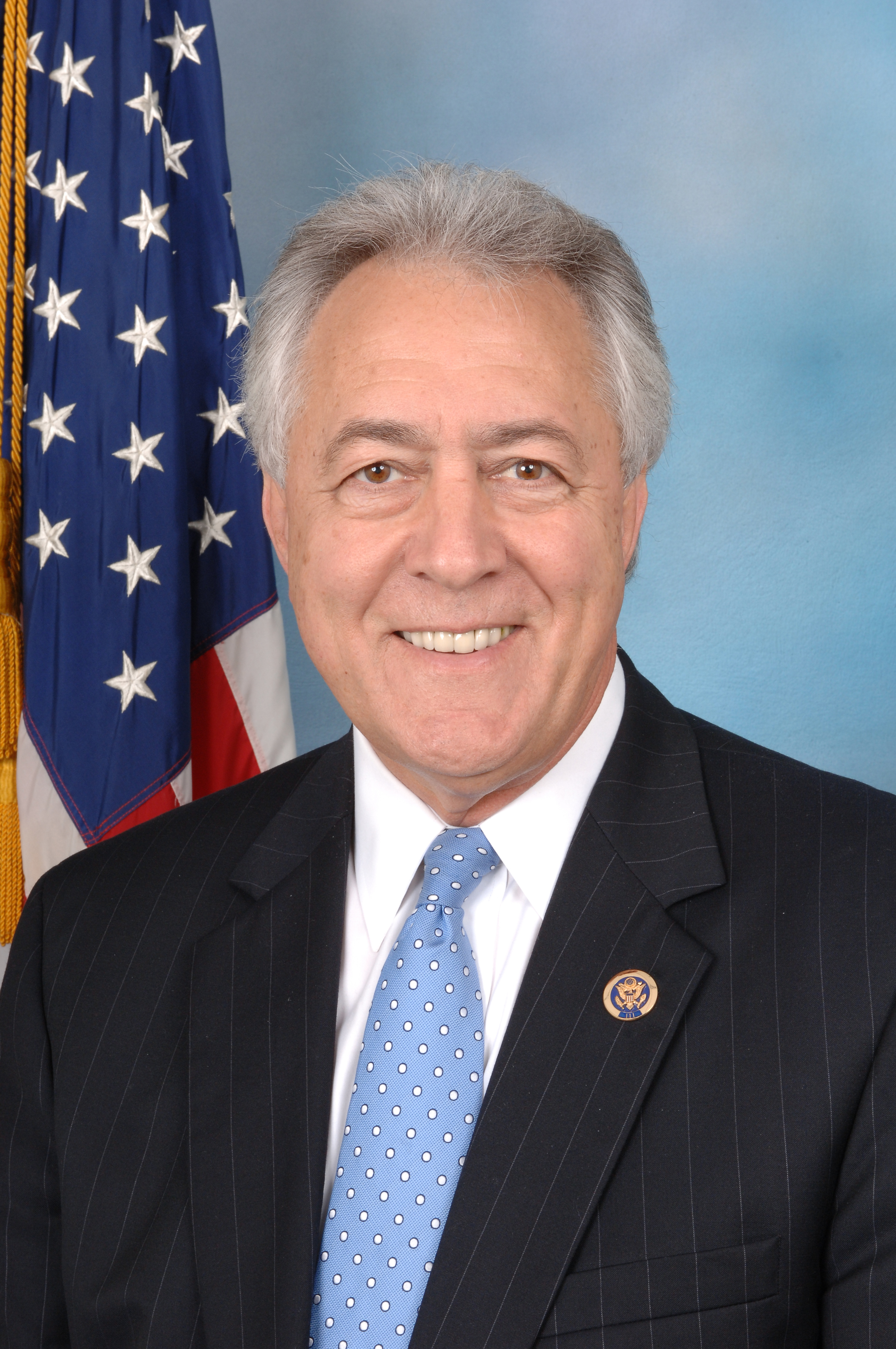

Louisiana Secretary of Veterans Affairs
- In office September 30, 2013 – June 3, 2014
- Governor: Bobby Jindal
- Preceded by: David LaCerte (acting)
- Succeeded by: David LaCerte (acting)

Member of the U.S. House of Representatives from Louisiana's 5th district
- In office January 3, 2003 – September 26, 2013
- Preceded by: John Cooksey
- Succeeded by: Vance McAllister

Member of the Louisiana House of Representatives from the 13th district
- In office January 1988 – January 2002
- Preceded by: Mike Tinnerello
- Succeeded by: James Fannin

Personal details
- Born: Rodney McKinnie Alexander; December 5, 1946 (age 79) Bienville, Louisiana, U.S.
- Party: Democratic (before 2004); Republican (2004–present)
- Spouse: Nancy Sutton
- Children: 3
- Education: Louisiana Tech University; University of Louisiana, Monroe (BA)

Military service
- Branch/service: United States Air Force
- Years of service: 1965–1971
- Unit: U.S. Air Force Reserve

Rodney McKinnie Alexander (born December 5, 1946) is an American politician and member of the Republican Party who served as the Secretary of the Louisiana Department of Veterans Affairs from September 30, 2013, until June 3, 2014. Previously he was the U.S. representative for Louisiana's 5th congressional district from 2003 to 2013. First elected as a Democrat, he changed parties in 2004 to run as a Republican and was re-elected five times.

== Background ==
Alexander was born in the village of Bienville in Bienville Parish to the former Mary Crawford and James Earl Alexander. In 1964, he graduated from Jonesboro-Hodge High School in Jonesboro in Jackson Parish, which is often cited as his hometown. He then attended Louisiana Tech University in Ruston, but he left college to work for his family construction company.

Alexander left the police jury to represent District 13 in the Louisiana House of Representatives from 1988 until his election to Congress in 2002. While in the state House, he served as the chairman of the House Health and Welfare Committee. In this position, her shepherded to passage the Louisiana Children's Health Insurance Program (LaCHIP), which assists mothers and children with basic health care and insurance needs.

Alexander enrolled in college courses intermittently for forty-five years. When the University of Louisiana at Monroe began to offer online courses, he enrolled for two years and graduated from ULM with a degree in general studies in 2009.

== U.S. House of Representatives ==
=== Elections ===
2002

Alexander won his seat in 2002 as a Democrat, but ran in 2004 as a Republican, changing parties on 6 August 2004, only three months before the election and only 30 minutes before the filing deadline. The move was derided by Democrats Robert Matsui and Mary Landrieu as being "cowardly".

2004

On August 4, 2004, he registered to run as a Democrat, but changed his registration to Republican two days later. He then defeated a fellow Republican, the late Jock Scott of Alexandria in the open primary that November. In 2006, he defeated the Democrat Gloria Williams Hearn, wife of the psychologist George E. Hearn of Pineville, Louisiana. His party switch became official on August 9, 2004.

2010

Alexander defeated Richard Todd Slavant of Monroe in the Republican closed primary by a margin of nearly 9–1. He faced Independent Tom Gibbs, Jr., of Ouachita Parish in the November 2 general election and won easily. No Democratic candidate had filed for the position, once held by such long-serving party members as Jerry Huckaby and Otto Passman. During this election, he joined the Tea Party Caucus.

2012

Alexander drew two last-minute challengers in his successful 2012 bid for a sixth term in the U.S. House. Alexander handily prevailed with 202,531 votes (77.8 percent). The Libertarian Clay Steven Grant received 20,194 votes (7.8 percent), and the No-Party candidate, Ron Caesar, polled 37,486 votes (14.4 percent).

During the 2012 election Alexander's campaign raised a total of $1,235,114. $942,083 were spent leaving the campaign with a surplus of $295,079 and no debt. Major contributors to Alexander's campaign came from a variety of business interests including the crop production industry, the oil and gas industry, commercial banks, and general contractors. Top individual contributors include Adams and Reese, the Livingston Group, O'Neal Gas, and Kadav Inc.

=== Tenure ===
At the commencement of the 111th Congress, Alexander received new subcommittee assignments including the Subcommittee on Energy and Water Development, the Subcommittee on Labor, Health and Human Services, Education, and Related Agencies (LHHS), and he retained his seat on the Subcommittee on Agriculture, Rural Development, Food and Drug Administrations, and Related Agencies (Agriculture).

His speeches include "Party of Paychecks" in which he speaks on the nations food-stamp necessity increase and speaks against "out-of-control government spending" and unemployment. Many of Alexander's other speeches include warning against tax increases and supporting religious freedom and public prayer.

Alexander's voting record shows a history of voting against tax law amendments on a variety of matters. He has also voted "Nay" on many extensions for relief or aid, regulations, and has voted "Yay" to prohibition of tax increase. In 2012, he voted for several pro-business, anti-environmental bills such as the Stop the War on Coal Act and the National Strategic and Critical Minerals Production Act. He has also voted to support small business through the Red Tape Reduction and Small Business Job Creation Act. Cumulatively, Alexander missed 266 of 7521 (3.5%) roll call votes during his time in office, higher than the national median of 2.5%.

=== Legislation ===
As a Representative, Alexander sponsored 36 bills, including:

==== 108th Congress (2003–2004) ====
- H.R. 1724, a bill to require higher education institutions that participate in student assistance programs to offer military leave to members of the Armed Forces for deployment and provide credits or refunds of tuition and other fees during such leaves, introduced April 10, 2003

==== 109th Congress (2005–2006) ====
- H.R. 3894, a bill to allow for emergency, temporary housing for victims of Hurricane Katrina, introduced September 26, 2005
- H.R. 5765, a bill to allow for a tax credit for employers equal to 15% of the first $10,000 in wages for members of the National Guard or Ready Reserve, introduced July 12, 2006. Alexander introduced a similar bill, H.R. 3620, in the 111th Congress.

==== 110th Congress (2007–2008) ====
- H.R. 924, a bill to prohibit the Food and Drug Administration from restricting the sale of certain turtles to be kept as pets, introduced February 8, 2007
- H.R. 7008, a bill to set limits on disaster relief financial aid given to private or investor-owned electric utility companies that provide service to low-income households, introduced September 23, 2008, reintroduced in the 111th Congress as H.R. 941

==== 111th Congress (2009–2010) ====
- H.R. 1891, a bill to allow for a gross income deduction for 50% of long-term care premiums without regard to other limitations on deductions, introduced April 2, 2009

==== 113th Congress (2013–2014) ====
- H.R. 1989, a bill to require the United States Forest Service to endeavor to accommodate individuals with mobility disabilities who would need to use a power-driven mobility device for access to Forest Service lands, introduced May 15, 2013
- H.R. 2752, a bill to exclude seasonal employees from being counted under the Patient Protection and Affordable Care Act's employer mandate, introduced July 19, 2013
- H.R. 2926, a bill to prohibit the federal government from revoking or withholding federal financial assistance that would otherwise be provided to any recipient on the basis of religious activities that are conducted voluntarily and initiated by participants in a program or activity carried out by such recipient, introduced August 1, 2013

=== Committee assignments ===
- Committee on Appropriations
  - Subcommittee on Energy and Water Development
  - Subcommittee on Financial Services and General Government
  - Subcommittee on Labor, Health and Human Services, Education, and Related Agencies (Vice Chair)

=== Caucus membership ===
- Congressional Caucus on Turkey and Turkish Americans
- Congressional Diabetes Caucus
- International Conservation Caucus
- Republican Study Committee
- Sportsmen's Caucus
- Tea Party Caucus
- Congressional Constitution Caucus

=== Interest group ratings ===
Alexander received favorable ratings from pro-life groups such as the Right to Life Committee and received low ratings from Planned Parenthood. Alexander also received favorable reviews from business groups such as the Chamber of Commerce and the National Federation of Independent Business. In addition, he had strong support from agricultural groups such as the American Farm Bureau Federation which gave him a 100 percent rating in 2011 and the Sportsman and Animal Owners Voting Alliance. Alexander has been given low ratings by civil rights groups such as the NAACP and the ACLU as well as environmental groups like the Defenders of Wildlife Action Fund.

=== Endorsements ===
Alexander was endorsed by Americans for Legal Immigration, Louisiana National Federation of Independent Business, National Federation of Independent Business, Chamber of Commerce, and the NRA Political Victory Fund. The National Federation for Independent Business named Alexander a "Guardian of Small Business" to acknowledge his strong voting record in favor of small businesses.

== Secretary of the Louisiana Department of Veterans Affairs ==
On September 30, 2013, Alexander became Secretary of the Louisiana Department of Veterans Affairs under Governor Bobby Jindal.

== Personal life ==
Alexander's wife, the former Nancy Sutton, is a long-time educator. They have three children and several grandchildren. Alexander is a Southern Baptist.

== See also ==
- List of American politicians who switched parties in office
- List of United States representatives who switched parties

U.S. House of Representatives
Preceded by John Cooksey	Member of the U.S. House of Representatives from Louisiana's 5th congressional district 2003–2013	Succeeded by Vance McAllister
U.S. order of precedence (ceremonial)
Preceded by Jimmy Hayes as Former U.S. Representative	Order of precedence of the United States as Former U.S. Representative	Succeeded by Cedric Richmond as Former U.S. Representative
