= Sergio Gucciardo =

Turkish footballer (born 1999)

Personal information
- Full name: Sergio Barış Gucciardo
- Date of birth: 19 April 1999 (age 27)
- Place of birth: Freiburg im Breisgau, Germany
- Height: 1.73 m (5 ft 8 in)
- Position: Midfielder

Team information
- Current team: Victoria Clarholz
- Number: 10

Youth career
- SV Obfingen
- –2014: SC Freiburg
- 2014: Karlsruher SC
- 2015: FC Emmendingen
- 2015–2017: SC Paderborn

Senior career*
| Years | Team | Apps | (Gls) |
| 2017 | SC Paderborn | 3 | (0) |
| 2017–2018 | VfL Bochum | 0 | (0) |
| 2018–2020 | SC Paderborn | 0 | (0) |
| 2018–2021 | SC Paderborn II | 41 | (18) |
| 2019 | → Alemannia Aachen (loan) | 0 | (0) |
| 2019–2020 | → SV Lippstadt (loan) | 14 | (1) |
| 2021–2022 | VfR Aalen | 11 | (1) |
| 2022–2024 | Sportfreunde Lotte | 30 | (1) |
| 2024– | Victoria Clarholz | 0 | (0) |

International career
| 2017 | Turkey U18 | 2 | (0) |
- * Club domestic league appearances and goals as of 26 May 2024

Sergio Barış Gucciardo (born 19 April 1999) is a footballer who plays as a midfielder for Oberliga Westfalen club Victoria Clarholz. Born in Germany, Gucciardo is a youth international for Turkey.

== Early life ==
Gucciardo was born to a Turkish mother and an Italian father; he grew up in Germany.

Gucciardo was loaned to Alemannia Aachen in July 2019, although one month later, it was announced that he would return to SC Paderborn 07. He was then loaned to SV Lippstadt 08.

== Career statistics ==
As of 1 July 2018

Appearances and goals by club, season and competition
| Club | Season | League | | | National Cup | | Total | |
| Club | Season | Division | Apps | Goals | Apps | Goals | Apps | Goals |
|---|---|---|---|---|---|---|---|---|
| SC Paderborn | 2016–17 | 3. Liga | 3 | 0 | — | | 3 | 0 |
| VfL Bochum | 2017–18 | 2. Bundesliga | 0 | 0 | 0 | 0 | 0 | 0 |
| SC Paderborn II | 2017–18 | Oberliga Westfalen | 4 | 1 | — | | 4 | 1 |
| SC Paderborn | 2017–18 | 3. Liga | 0 | 0 | — | | 0 | 0 |
| SC Paderborn | 2018–19 | 2. Bundesliga | 0 | 0 | 0 | 0 | 0 | 0 |
| SC Paderborn | Total | | 0 | 0 | 0 | 0 | 0 | 0 |
| Career total | | | 7 | 1 | 0 | 0 | 7 | 1 |
