= Louisiana Department of Veterans Affairs =

Agency overview
- Formed: 1944
- Jurisdiction: Government of Louisiana
- Agency executive: Charlton J. Meginley, Secretary
- Website: www.vetaffairs.la.gov

In 1944, The Louisiana Office of Veterans Affairs was created to provide local services to Louisiana Veterans and their families. In 2003 the Louisiana Department of Veterans Affairs (LDVA) was established as a cabinet-level department of the State of Louisiana to provide service to Louisiana's Veterans and their families with regard to healthcare, education, disability benefits, long-term care, and burial honors.

LDVA is responsible for the oversight of the five Louisiana Veterans Homes, the four Louisiana Veterans Cemeteries (with the fifth cemetery currently under construction), and the 64 parish service offices.

LDVA operates many veterans programs, including the Military Family Assistance Fund and the Louisiana Veterans Honor Medal Program.

== Veterans homes ==
- Louisiana Veterans Home, Jackson, Louisiana
- Northeast Louisiana Veterans Home, Monroe, Louisiana
- Southwest Louisiana Veterans Home, Jennings, Louisiana
- Northwest Louisiana Veterans Home, Bossier City, Louisiana
- Southeast Louisiana Veterans Home, Reserve, Louisiana

== Veterans cemeteries ==
- Northwest Louisiana Veterans Cemetery, Keithville, Louisiana
- Central Louisiana Veterans Cemetery, Leesville, Louisiana
- Southeast Louisiana Veterans Cemetery, Slidell, Louisiana opened June 2014
- Northeast Louisiana Veterans Cemetery, Rayville, Louisiana opened November 2015
- Southwest Louisiana Veterans Cemetery, Jennings, Louisiana opening in 2019

== Veterans programs ==
- Military Family Assistance Fund
- Louisiana Veterans Honor Medal Program
- State Approving Agency

== Directors/Secretaries ==
- Lindon Dalferes (1924–1944)
- Joe Darwin (1944–1948)
- Joseph F. Colsan (1948–1952)
- Lloyd E. Hatley (1952–1956)
- David J. Bell (1956–1959)
- Emil J. Bourg Jr. (1959–1960)
- Hal A. Burgess (1960–1964)
- L.L. "Dick" Staggs (1964–1973)
- Percy A. Lemoine (1973–1980)
- John L. McGovern (1980–1984)
- Cleo C. Yarbrough (1984–1988)
- Printice A. Darnell (1988–1992)
- Ernie P. Broussard (1992–1996)
- John Caulking (1996–1998)
- Joey Strickland (1998–2004)
- Major-General Hunt Downer (2004–2008) First Secretary
- Lane Carson (2008–2013)
- David LaCerte (2013, interim)
- Rodney Alexander (2013–2014)
- David LaCerte (2014–2016)
- Joey Strickland (2016–present)
