= Expressway S1 (Poland) =

Expressway in Poland connecting Upper Silesia and Bielsko-Biała with Czechia

Expressway S1
- Droga ekspresowa S1

Route information
- Part of E75
- Maintained by GDDKiA
- Length: 93.1 km (57.8 mi) 132.81 km (82.52 mi) planned

Major junctions
- From: A1 near Katowice International Airport in Pyrzowice
- 86 near Podwarpie 94 in Dąbrowa Górnicza; 79 in Mysłowice; A4 near Mysłowice; 86 near Tychy S52 near Bielsko-Biała
- To: D3 motorway, border with Slovakia

Location
- Country: Poland
- Major cities: Dąbrowa Górnicza, Sosnowiec, Mysłowice, Tychy, Bielsko-Biała, Żywiec

Highway system
- National roads in Poland; Voivodeship roads
| ← S 86 | → S 2 |

Expressway S1 or express road S1 is a Polish highway under construction with a planned length of 133 km (83 mi), located in the Silesian Voivodeship. Upon completion, it will connect the A1 motorway near the Katowice International Airport in Pyrzowice with the border of Slovakia in Zwardoń, linking to the D3 motorway.

The route is expected to be completed in 2027.

== Route ==
The section from A1 motorway to A4 motorway and further to Tychy is open to traffic. It forms the eastern beltway of the Upper Silesian Industrial Region.

From Tychy to Bielsko-Biała, the existing dual-carriageway national road 1 serves the traffic. New parallel expressway route is under construction, planned to be finished in 2027.

From Bielsko-Biała to the Slovak border in Zwardoń, the expressway is completed. The section from Żywiec to Zwardoń is a single-carriageway expressway, with the exception of the 5-kilometer long fragment including two pairs of tunnels, which was already constructed in a dual-carriageway profile to avoid lost costs in case of adding the second carriageway in the future. At the border the road connects to the single-carriageway D3 motorway in Slovakia.

== Road numbering ==
The S1 originally was routed from Bielsko-Biała via Cieszyn to the Czech border. This section was renumbered to Expressway S52 in 2016 and the S1 was rerouted over the former Expressway S69.

== Expressway route description ==
=== Pyrzowice-Tychy ===
| Number of exit (facility) | Exits, facilities | Mileage from beginning | Status | History of construction | Notes |
|---|---|---|---|---|---|
| 1) | Pyrzowice | 0 km | Done | Opened in June 2012 | Terminus |
| 2) | Pyrzowice-Lotnisko | 1.9 km (1.18 mi) | Done | Was the terminus till June 2012 | 2nd carriageway opened in May 2021 |
| 3) | Mierzęcice | 5.5 km (3.42 mi) | Done | Opened in November 2006 | 2nd carriageway opened in May 2021 |
| 4) | Podwarpie(southbound) (northbound) | 12.8 km (7.95 mi) | Done | | |
| 5) | Dąbrowa Górnicza Ząbkowice | 20.2 km (12.55 mi) | Done | | 1 lane per direction at the moment |
| 6) | Dąbrowa Górnicza Pogoria | 22.6 km (14.04 mi) | Done | Completed 1978–1983 | |
| 7) | Dąbrowa Górnicza Gołonóg | 24.3 km (15.10 mi) | Done | Completed 1978–1983 | |
| 8) | Dąbrowa Górnicza Sulno | 25.2 km (15.66 mi) | Done | Completed 1978–1983 | |
| 9) | Sosnowiec Porąbka | 28.9 km (17.96 mi) | Done | Completed 1978–1983 | |
| (1) | Petrol station | 31.8 km (19.76 mi) | Done | | Koniczyna |
| 10) | Sosnowiec Dańdówka | 33.2 km (20.63 mi) | Done | Completed 1978–1983 | Entrance/exit northbound only |
| 11) | Sosnowiec Jęzor | 36.9 km (22.93 mi) | Done | Completed 1978–1983 | |
| 12) | Mysłowice Brzęczkowice (E462 starting from the interchange eastbound) | 39.2 km (24.36 mi) | Done | Completed 1978–1983 | |
| 13) | Mysłowice Brzezinka | 41.2 km (25.60 mi) | Done | Completed 1978–1983 | Droga wójewodzka 934 goes parallel with S1 |
| 14) | Mysłowice Dziećkowice | 42.1 km (26.16 mi) | Done | Completed 1978–1983 | |
| 15) | Imielin Other name: Kosztowy-II(passing the stages to achieve the environmental decision) | 43.3 km (26.91 mi) | Done | Completed 1978–1983 | Exit only southbound, entrance only northbound |
| 16) | Olszyce | 46.2 km (28.71 mi) | Done | Completed 1978–1983 | |
| (2) | MOP Lędziny | 48.8 km (30.32 mi) | Done | Completed 1978–1983 | Petrol station, restaurant |
| 17) | Tychy | 54.8 km (34.05 mi) | Done | Completed 1978–1983 | Terminus |

=== Kosztowy-II – Bielsko-Biała ===
As of the end of May 2016 six options for the route were proposed.

Route variants

Five of them were already available by June 2008. At first option IV(D) was preferable. It would have gone parallel to Brzeszcze – Oświęcim railway tracks (PKP rail line 93). However, UNESCO protested against the choice, as, in their opinion, the traffic would have disrupted the zone of silence around the former German concentration camp Auschwitz-Birkenau, and, as the result, UNESCO would have put the camp onto the endangered list.

At the beginning of August 2009, the head of Miedźna county has announced to the media his option of the S1 (option VI), that would have gone through a forest on the borders of the Miedźna and Bojszowy county. In November 2009, it was accepted by all the local counties. However, GDDKiA turned down this option due to environmental issues. The road would have passed through the "Stawy w Brzeszczach" reserve for birds conservation, which was not acceptable.

- Option A (39.7 km) would have run through the following counties:
  - Mysłowice
  - Lędziny
  - Imielin
  - Bieruń
  - Bojszowy
  - Miedźna
  - Bestwina
  - Wilamowice
  - Bielsko-Biała
- Option B (40.4 km) would have run through the following counties:
  - Mysłowice
  - Lędziny
  - Imielin
  - Bieruń
  - Bojszowy
  - Oświęcim
  - Bestwina
  - Brzeszcze
  - Wilamowice
  - Bielsko-Biała
- Option C (40.8 km) would have run through the following counties:
  - Mysłowice
  - Lędziny
  - Imielin
  - Bieruń
  - Bojszowy
  - Oświęcim
  - Bestwina
  - Brzeszcze
  - Wilamowice
  - Bielsko-Biała
- Option D (42.1 km) would have run through the following counties:
  - Mysłowice
  - Lędziny
  - Imielin
  - Bieruń
  - Bojszowy
  - Oświęcim
  - Bestwina
  - Brzeszcze
  - Wilamowice
  - Bielsko-Biała.

Counties through which the road would have passed according to the option V:

  - Mysłowice (Kosztowy)
  - Lędziny
  - Bieruń
  - Międzyrzecze
  - Gilowice
  - Miedźna
  - Bestwinka
  - Kaniów
  - Dankowice
  - Stara Wieś
  - Bielsko-Biała (Hałcnów)

Counties through which the road would have passed according to the option VI:

  - Mysłowice (Kosztowy)
  - Lędziny
  - Bieruń
  - Oświęcim (Stare Stawy)
  - Brzeszcze
  - Dankowice
  - Stara Wieś
  - Bielsko-Biała (Hałcnów) In 2013 the Economical, Technical and Environmental Institution has proposed 4 choices (A, B, C, and D), of which choices A and C were preferred. However, the mining company "Brzeszcze" was against choice C, and "SILESIA" mining enterprise against A. As a compromise, GDDKIA promised to work on the additional option "E". Preparatory works for DŚU were done by 7 January 2015. In March 2015 choice "E" was chosen as preferred. In June the same year Regional Directorate of the Environment Protection in Katowice has asked GDDKiA to give out the environmental decision for the section.

In 2013 a new option, presented by the mining companies "SILESIA" and "Brzeszcze" and by Miedźna, Brzeszcze and Bestwina counties, was proposed. The option "H"(or hybrid), as it is known, was an initial compromise between the companies and counties and GDDKiA. However it wasn't implemented.

The project was expected to cost approximately 1.437 bln złotych.

| Number of exit(facility) | Name | Mileage from beginning | State | Notes |
|---|---|---|---|---|
| 1) | Kosztowy-II | 0 km | With environmental decision | Connection with S1 to Tychy |
| 2) | Lędziny | ca. 6 km (3.73 mi) | With environmental decision | |
| (1) | MOP | 7.5 km (4.66 mi) | With environmental decision | |
| 3) | Bieruń | ca. 12.3 km (7.64 mi) | With environmental decision | |

=== Interchanges ===
- „Kosztowy II" (after construction the road to Tychy will be designated as S1A)
- „Lędziny"
- „Bieruń"
- „Oświęcim" (future connection to Oświęcim bypass)
- „Wola”
- „Brzeszcze"
- „Stara Wieś"
- „Hałcnów"

=== Bielsko-Biała-Zwardoń ===
==== Route description ====
| Number of exit (facility) | Exits, facilities | Mileage from beginning | History of construction | Notes |
| 1) | Bielsko-Biała-Komorowice | 0 km | Works from here to Hałcnów interchange were allowed in May 2009 | To Hałcnów interchange concurrency with, western terminus |
| 2) | Bielsko-Biała-Rosta | 2.9 km (1.80 mi) | Works from here to Hałcnów interchange were allowed in May 2009 | To Hałcnów interchange concurrency with, western terminus |
| 3) | Hałcnów (planned) | 4.5 km (2.80 mi) | Contract was signed in October 2008 to the Bielsko-Biała-Mikuszowice-II interchange | planned have an interchange here |
| 4) | Bielsko-Biała-Lipnik | 6.8 km (4.23 mi) | Contract was signed in October 2008 to the Bielsko-Biała-Mikuszowice-II interchange | |
| 5) | Bielsko-Biała-Mikuszowice-I | 11 km (6.84 mi) | Contract was signed in October 2008 to the Bielsko-Biała-Mikuszowice-II interchange | |
| 6) | Bielsko-Biała-Mikuszowice-II | 11.5 km (7.15 mi) | Contract was signed in October 2008 to the Bielsko-Biała-Mikuszowice-II interchange | |
| 7) | Wilkowice | 14.2 km (8.82 mi) | From here to Żywiec interchange: first contract signed in 2010, which was cancelled two years later, and signed with other company in July 2014. Done in July 2015. | |
| 8) | Buczkowice | 17.7 km (11.00 mi) | From here to Żywiec interchange: first contract signed in 2010, which was cancelled two years later, and signed with other company in July 2014. Done in July 2015. | |
| 9) | Łodygowice | 21 km (13.05 mi) | From here to Żywiec interchange: first contract signed in 2010, which was cancelled two years later, and signed with other company in July 2014. Done in July 2015. | |
| 10) | Żywiec Soła | 26.5 km (16.47 mi) | From here to Przybędza interchange: signed in June 2005, done by November 2006 | |
| 11) | Żywiec Browar | 29 km (18.02 mi) | From here to Przybędza interchange: signed in June 2005, done by November 2006 | |
| 12) | Przybędza | 33.7 km (20.94 mi) | Section to be completed in August 2023 | |
| 13) | Milówka | 45.5 km (28.27 mi) | Section to be completed in August 2023 | |
| 14) | Laliki | 50.1 km (31.13 mi) | | No exit of eastbound traffic on the road |
| 15) | Rajcza | 52.9 km (32.87 mi) | | |
| 16) | Zwardoń | 55.5 km (34.49 mi) | | Last interchange before border |
| 17) | Country border | 56.7 km (35.23 mi) | | Entrance to Slovakia |

== See also ==
- Highways in Poland
- European route E75
