= Fürstengrube subcamp =

Subcamp of the Auschwitz concentration camp

- Nazi forced labour subcamp of Auschwitz
- Location of the former Sonnenburg concentration camp in Poland
- Coordinates: 50°11′30″N 19°05′50″E
- Location: Wesoła, Mysłowice, Poland
- Operational: 1943–1945

The Fürstengrube subcamp was a subcamp of the Auschwitz concentration camp, operated by Nazi Germany in 1943–1945 in Wesoła near Mysłowice in occupied Poland.

It was organized in the summer of 1943 at the Fürstengrube hard coal mine in the town of Wesoła, approximately 30 kilometers (19 mi) from Auschwitz concentration camp. The mine, which IG Farbenindustrie AG acquired in February 1941, was to supply hard coal for the IG Farben factory being built in Auschwitz. Besides the old Fürstengrube mine, called the Altanlage, a new mine (Fürstengrube-Neuanlage) had been designed and construction had begun; it was to provide for greater coal output in the future. Coal production at the new mine was anticipated to start in late 1943, so construction was treated as very urgent; however, that plan proved to be unfeasible.

In the period before the Auschwitz concentration camp prisoners were sent to work at Fürstengrube, the mine employed Soviet prisoners of war, Jewish slave laborers, and forced laborers from the USSR in addition to its regular staff. Negotiations in July 1943 between Auschwitz Commandant Rudolf Höss and representatives of IG Farbenindustrie AG and Fürstengrube GmbH, led to an agreement to build a new camp for approximately 600 prisoners—increasing to 1,200-1,300 later—from Auschwitz.

Mainly Jews built the new camp. They lived in the mine's forced-labor camp for Jews, which was under the so-called Organisation Schmelt; that camp was called Lager Ostland. The Jewish prisoners from that camp were taken away even before the prisoners were moved from the Auschwitz concentration camp. The camp report for August 1943 no longer mentions the number of Jews employed. The prisoners moved from Auschwitz then continued the subcamp's construction and expansion.

In early September 1943, the SS began moving prisoners, probably including a few German prisoner foremen, from Auschwitz to the Fürstengrube subcamp, which appears as "Lager Süd" on mine maps. On September 4, 1943, the Auschwitz labor office reported that 129 prisoners were working at the Fürstengrube subcamp; by July 1944 that number had risen to approximately 1,200, 85 to 90 percent of whom were Jews. Polish Jews were the most numerous group, but Jews from Germany, Austria, France, Belgium, the Netherlands, Czechoslovakia, Hungary, and Greece were also present. Starting in the spring of 1944, there were also several dozen non-Jewish Polish prisoners at Fürstengrube.

For the first three months, the subcamp was under the direct charge of Auschwitz headquarters; after November 22, 1943, under Auschwitz III-Monowitz. Effective May 22, 1944, the 3rd Guard Company of Auschwitz III took charge of the guard duty. SS Master Sergeant Otto Moll was named the subcamp's first commandant; he served in that position until March 1944. SS Technical Sergeant Max Schmidt succeeded Moll until the subcamp was shut down in January 1945. The SS staff at the beginning of 1944 consisted of 47 SS men and grew to 64 at the end of the year.

Prisoners from Auschwitz who went to the Fürstengrube subcamp were mostly put to work extracting coal in the old mine and building the new one. Prisoners working in the old mine were divided up into three shifts: morning (5 a.m. to 1 p.m.), day (1 p.m. to 9 p.m.), and night (9 p.m. to 5 a.m.). Work at the mine was especially difficult and dangerous because of the low galleries and the abundance of water. Prisoners did not receive the required protective clothing and they were constantly vulnerable to beatings and abuse from the mine's civilian staff as well as prisoner-foremen. The prisoners building the new mine faced equally brutal and exhausting work. They worked in one shift, a day shift, doing all sorts of construction and assembly jobs in groups of painters, bricklayers, welders, metalworkers, and assemblers. Additionally, when the shifts were over, many of the prisoners then had to work to expand the camp.

Only very sick prisoners were admitted to the camp infirmary. SS doctors conducted periodic selections there and among the other prisoners as well; prisoners who were no longer able to work were moved to the Birkenau hospital sector (BIIf). The rotation of prisoners was significant as new prisoners replaced those who had been selected. For example, from May 8 to 14, 1944, as many as 42 Fürstengrube prisoners entered the hospital sector of Birkenau.

In spite of the hard conditions and fight for survival, despite the beatings and persecution, there were attempts to maintain a cultural life at the subcamp, in the form of band concerts and plays. Some prisoners secretly drew portraits of their fellow inmates.

Only a few escapes and escape attempts from the Fürstengrube subcamp are known. Gabriel Rothkopf, a Polish Jew, escaped during the night of December 18–19, 1943, while returning from work at the old mine. In response, Commandant Moll personally shot a randomly selected group of prisoners in front of their fellows and left their bodies on the assembly ground until the next shift returned. Ivan Potekhnin, a Russian prisoner, escaped on April 15, 1944. In the spring of 1944, a group of prisoners dug a tunnel from a barrack, but during an inspection five German Jews were apprehended in it; they were later hanged. In June 1944, Commandant Schmidt shot a Russian prisoner who intended to escape from the subcamp. In late August 1944, yet another Russian prisoner was shot; he had attempted to escape in a freight car leaving the new mine construction site. The escape attempt of a Polish prisoner named Gorewicz, working in the forge, also ended with his execution.

Polish miners on the site helped a group of Polish prisoners by smuggling messages, food, and news of the situation on the fronts. However, the camp's political branch got word of the activity, probably in late August 1944. The prisoners were sent to Auschwitz I and, after approximately two months of interrogation, they were brought back to Fürstengrube and hanged on October 10, 1944.

In September, November, and December 1944, the Polish and Russian prisoners were moved to the Flossenbürg, Buchenwald, and Mauthausen concentration camps. As of January 17, 1945, 1,283 prisoners, chiefly Jews, remained in the subcamp. On January 19, having burnt the camp's records, the SS led approximately 1,000 prisoners out of the camp, headed for Gliwice (Gleiwitz) via Mikolow. Severe cold and icy roads made the march difficult, and SS men killed anyone who fell out. On the evening of January 20, 1945, the Fürstengrube prisoners reached the Gleiwitz II subcamp, where they joined prisoners from Auschwitz III-Monowitz as well as some other subcamps. The next day, January 21, the SS loaded approximately 4,000 prisoners into open railway cars bound for Mauthausen. The authorities at Mauthausen did not accept the transport, however, as the camp was overcrowded, but sent the train on to Mittelbau (Dora), where it arrived on January 28. Out of 4,000 prisoners, only about 3,500 survived the seven-day trip.

On January 27, 1945, at about 4:00 p.m., a dozen or so SS men entered the Fürstengrube subcamp and killed most of the remaining prisoners; some they shot, and some burned to death when the SS set their barracks on fire. Only the sudden arrival of Soviet troops forced the SS to flee, thus sparing a few of the prisoners. A mine employee who was present afterward reported that they buried 239 bodies. About 20 prisoners survived the massacre. One of them, former prisoner Rudolf Ehrlich, testified to these events on May 9, 1945, before the Investigation Commission for German Nazi Crimes at Auschwitz.

Rudolf Ehrlich described how there were approximately 350 mine workers each day. After surviving the massacre on January 27, 1945, Rudolf and the other survivors hid in the camps former shoemaker's workshop for 3 days before being transported to a local hospital in Myslowice on February 3, 1945.

In a United States Military Court trial in Dachau from November 15 to December 13, 1945, Otto Moll, the first commandant of the Fürstengrube subcamp, was sentenced to death by hanging for unrelated atrocities committed in Dachau concentration camp. The sentence was carried out on May 28, 1946.

== Notes ==
This article incorporates text from the United States Holocaust Memorial Museum, and has been released under the GFDL.

- An account of life in this camp is contained in The Dentist of Auschwitz: A Memoir, by Benjamin Jacobs, pub University Press of Kentucky, 2001, ISBN 978-0813190129.
