= Biała Przemsza =

River in southern Poland

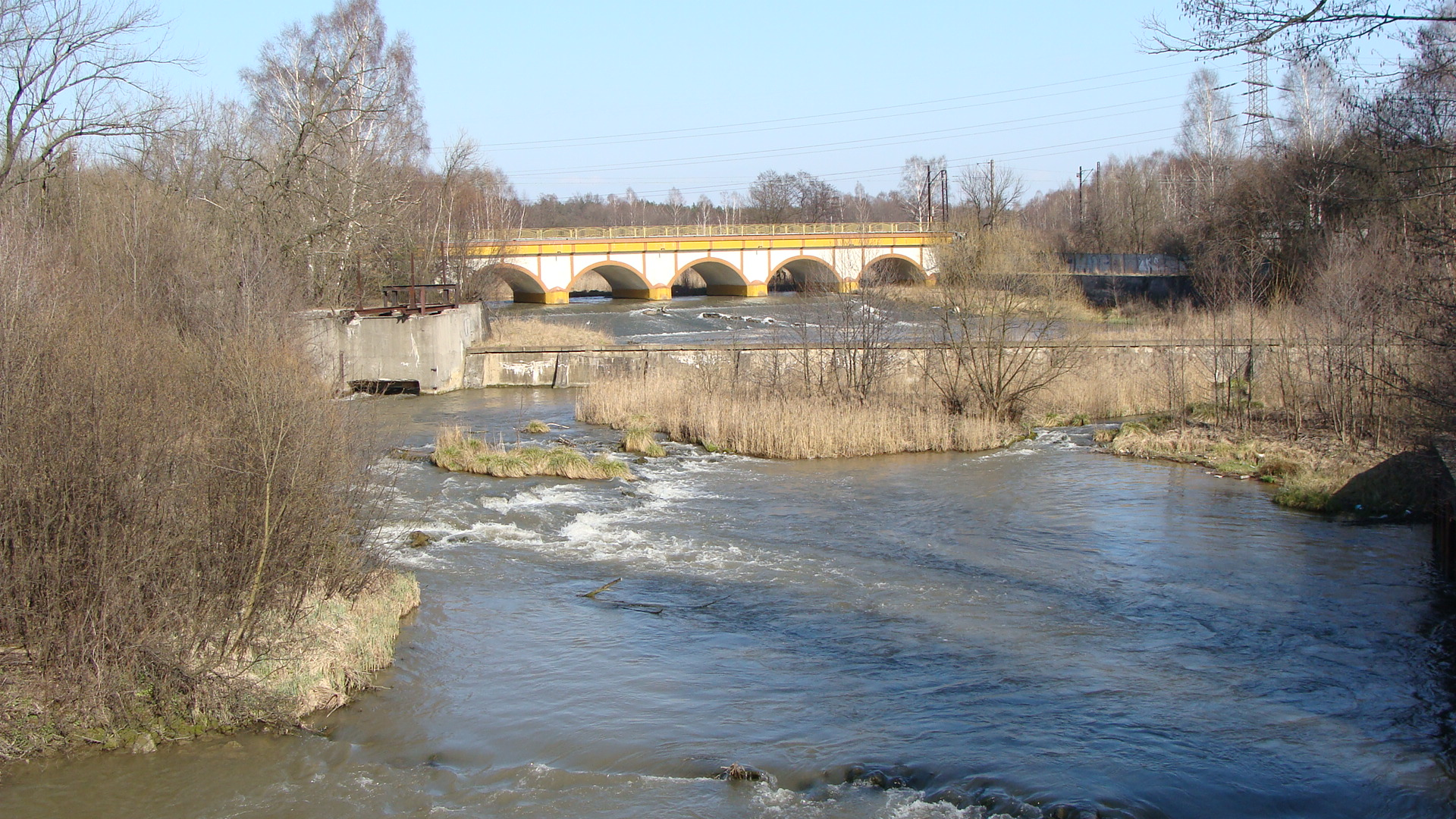

Location
- Country: Poland

Physical characteristics
- Mouth
  - location: Przemsza
  - coordinates: 50°13′46″N 19°09′28″E

Basin features
- Progression: Przemsza→ Vistula→ Baltic Sea

The Biała Przemsza is a river of Poland, a tributary of the Przemsza near Mysłowice. It has a length of 63.9 km and a catchment area of 876.6 km². The river forms branches, meanders, urea, sometimes joints. Flows and water states are constant.

== Drainage ==
The Biała Przemsza originates in the Olkuska Highlands from the springs flowing from the peatland at an altitude of 376 m above sea level, southwest of Wolbromia. From there, under the name Centary iy flows to the southwest in a flat-bottomed deep valley at 8–12 m and 200–300 m wide. In Chrząstowice falls into it from the east from purgatory plow, which, however, in recent years completely dries up. In Golczowice accepts a stream flowing from the Black Forest. In the Keys falls into it from the north the flow flowing from the village of Rodaki. Sailing further west flows through the Erival Desert, dividing it in half. At its western end it flows into it from the north, from the village of Chechło, Centuria, and from the south-west. Further, the river changes direction to the south and narrow, deep valley breaks through The Ząbkowicki Garb to Sławków. It flows through Okradzionów, Dąbrowa Górnicza district and the southern edge of the District of Sosnowiec Maczki and Jaworzna districts.

On the border of two Sosnowiec districts: Niwki and Boru and Mysłowice at an altitude of about 100 000 m. 250 m above sea level connects with The Black Przemsa to form Przems, which flows into the Vistula River. This place in the area of confluence of the borders of Sosnowiec and Mysłowice is known as the Triangle of the Three Emperors.

White Przemsza in considerable length has retained its natural character. The natural, meandering section between 11.9 and 14 km of river course was decided by the Jaworzno City Council recognized as ecological use "Zakola Biała Przemsha"

== History ==
In the years 1796–1806 Biała Przemsza was a border river between Prussian New Silesia and Austria, and in the years 1815–1914, on the stretch from Slavkov to Maczek, between Galicia and the Russian partition. In the years 1826–1831 it transported sheet metal and castings from the rolling mill near Sławków to the river port in Niwka. Until 1839, a steam ship built by The Englishman Davy, called cheortopchajem by the inhabitants of coastal villages, was running on the White Cross. In the 19th century, smaller galleys were also operating along the river, carrying agricultural products and coal to the mouth of the river.
