= Sielec Park =

Historic park in Sosnowiec, Poland

Sielec Park in Sosnowiec
- Park Sielecki
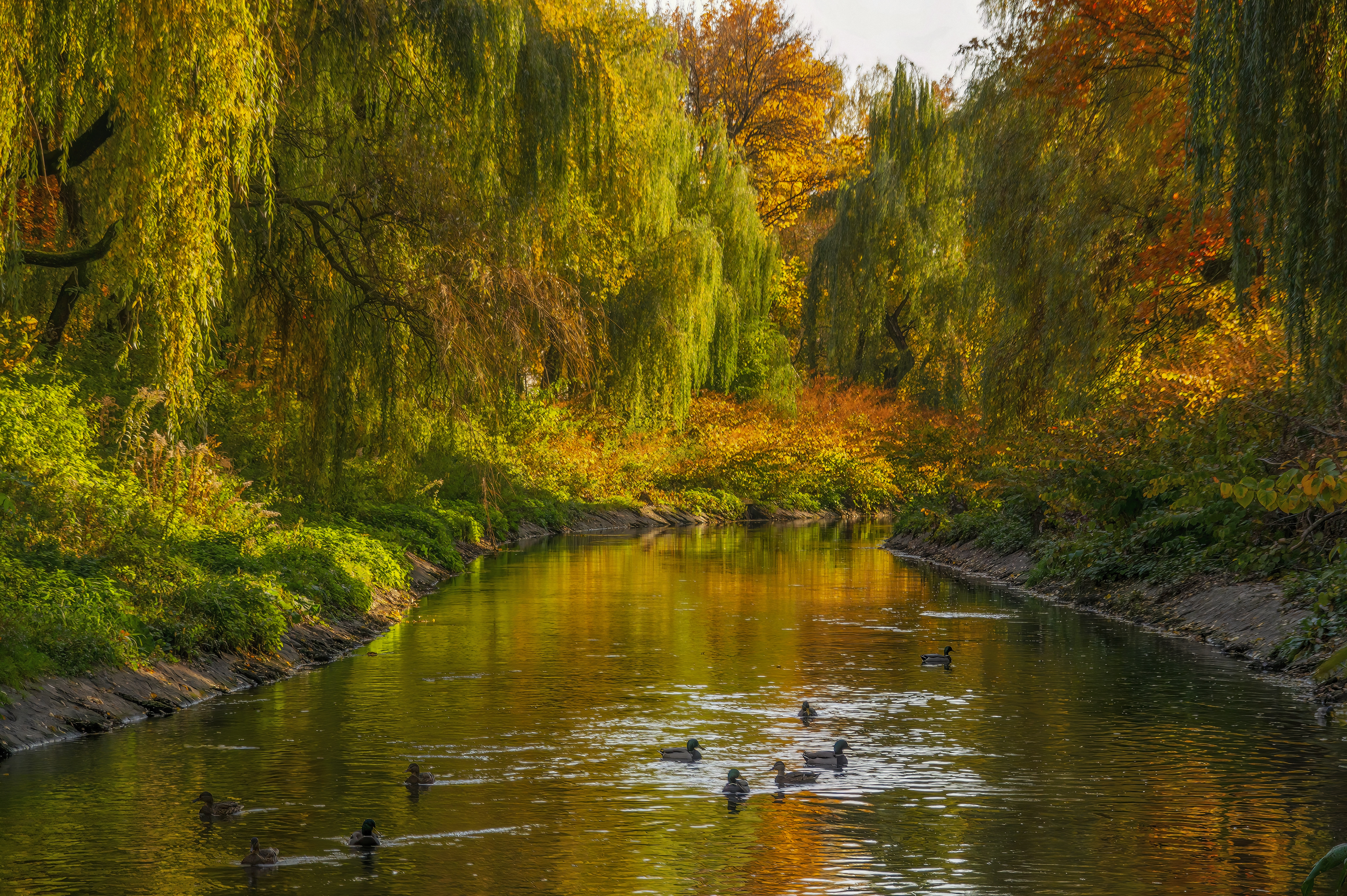
- Sielecki Park along the Czarna Przemsza River in Sosnowiec
- Interactive map of Sielec Park in Sosnowiec
- Location: Sosnowiec, Poland
- Coordinates: 50°17′02″N 19°08′30″E
- Area: 20.24 hectares (50.0 acres)
- Designation: A/15/60, 23 February 1960 (Katowice Voivodeship); A/921/2021, 9 December 2021 (Silesian Voivodeship)

The Sielec Park (formerly known as Renard Park, Mauve Park) is a historic urban park in Sosnowiec, Poland. It is the second oldest and fourth largest municipal park in the city and the largest listed historic park, forming a complex with the Sielecki Castle. The park is divided into two sections: the "old park" and the "new park," covering 10.4 ha and 9.84 ha, respectively. The Czarna Przemsza River runs through the park, marking the boundary between the two sections.

== Location ==
Sielecki Park is located in the Sielec district, adjacent to the Czarna Przemsza River and on the border between the Śródmieście and Pogoń districts. Its boundaries are marked by 3 Maja Street to the west and north, the Sielecki Castle and Zamkowa Street to the east, and residential areas along Parkowa, Legionów, Kręta, and Sielecka Streets to the south.

== History ==
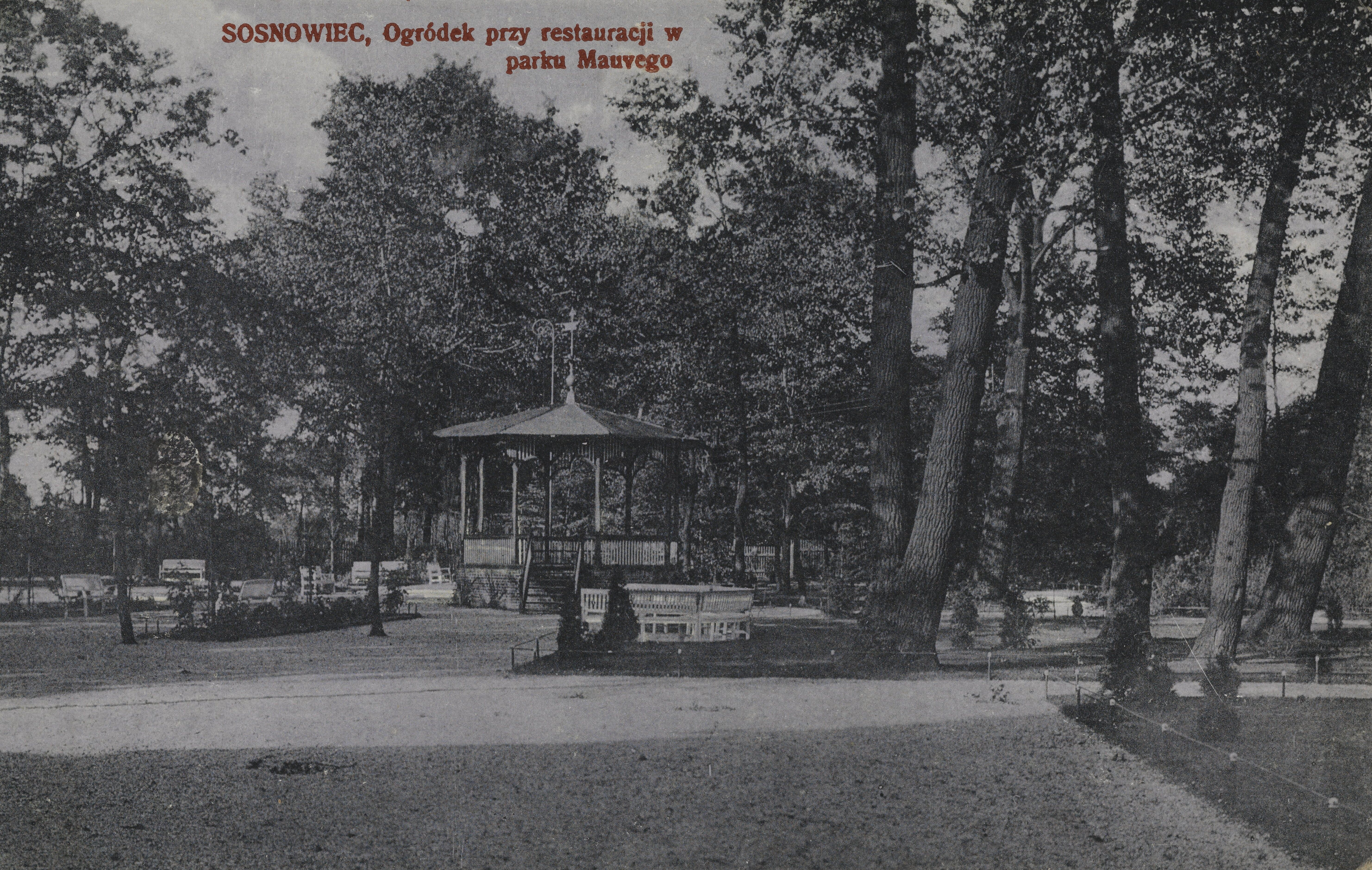
Sielecki Park / Muavego Park in 1917

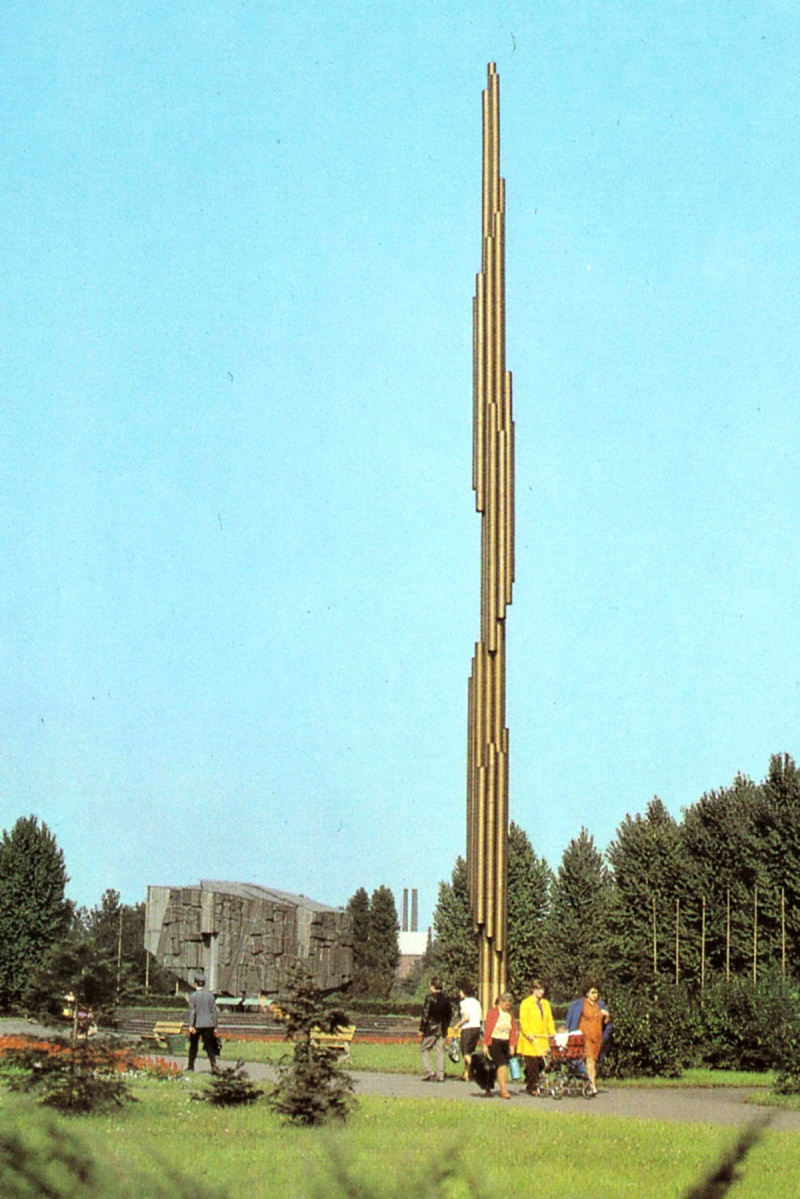
The now-dismantled Monument of Revolutionary Deed in Sosnowiec

In 1856, the Sielec estate, including the castle, was purchased by Count Andrzej Renard from Strzelce Opolskie for his son Jan. While serving in a consular capacity in Vienna, Jan managed the estate through his proxy, director Herman Möbius, until 1874. During his tenure, the castle was rebuilt, and a landscape park in the then-popular English style was established, enhancing the beauty of the site. As a result of these efforts, the castle was transformed into a representative palace.

In 1875, the estate was placed under the management of Ludwig Mauve, who diligently continued the maintenance and modernization of the park, which became popularly associated with his name. In 1903, decisions were made to adjust the park's boundaries, reducing its area for the construction of a church at the current site of Skautów Street and expanding it southeast near Kręta Street. A pond was established in the northern part of the park, while an ornamental limestone wall was built on the eastern side. The enclosure, several hundred meters long and two meters high, separated the park from the nearby residential area. The park had three wooden gateways with porters for 24-hour surveillance and private gates secured by locks. Until the 1940s, access to the park was restricted and required special passes.

In the 1960s and 1970s, "Renard Park" was expanded by incorporating nearby private orchards, vegetable gardens, a water settlers’ station, and parts of industrial allotments from the historic "Huldczyński steelworks". The expansion extended the park's boundaries beyond the Czarna Przemsza River to 3 Maja Street. During the redevelopment of the northeastern part of Sielec for municipal sports and cultural facilities, much of the park’s aesthetic value was lost. The pond was filled in, many trees and shrubs were cut down, most of the asphalt pathways were paved over, and the ornamental walls and towers were demolished. Only the castle building and two historic towers were preserved. One tower stands between buildings opposite the ice rink’s main entrance, while the other is located on the left bank of the river near a house at 28 Legionów Street. Replacing the demolished structures, a now-defunct amphitheater, open-air swimming pools, and artificial ice rinks were built, serving as training grounds for the local ice hockey team. On 23 February 1960, the Sielecki Castle and its adjacent park, bordered by Zamkowa Street, 3 Maja Street, and the Czarna Przemsza River, were listed as historic monuments.

On 6 September 1967, the Monument of Revolutionary Deed was unveiled at the park's central point. The monument was visited by Fidel Castro in 1972 and Leonid Brezhnev in 1974. Its fame came from a towering tube structure. In May 1991, the monument was dismantled.

What remains is the marble pedestal and adjacent square, now hosting a new monument featuring a White Eagle (the Coat of Arms of Poland) and the inscription "Freedom, Work, Dignity". In 2005, during another park redevelopment, a skatepark was opened in the northern part of the park near the Winter Stadium. In 2016 and 2017, further developments enriched the park. The old section gained a fenced children’s playground and an outdoor gym under the open sky. In the new section, a roller-skating track, relaxation area, and small catering facilities were added. On 31 January 2019, the Sosnowiec City Council officially named the park on 3 Maja Street "Park Sielecki". On 4 May 2023, a brine graduation tower was opened in the park’s northern section, funded by the Citizens’ Budget.

== Flora and Fauna ==
The park is home to approximately 60 species of trees and shrubs, including rare specimens such as the southern catalpa, Amur cork tree, and scarlet hawthorn. Twelve trees are protected as natural monuments, including six late poplar trees, two field elms, a silver maple, and a pedunculate oak.

== Facilities ==
The park offers a wide range of recreational and cultural facilities, including:

- Skatepark
- Roller skating track
- Outdoor gym
- Playground
- Saline graduation tower
- Picnic areas and food trucks
