= Krasowy =

- Mysłowice District
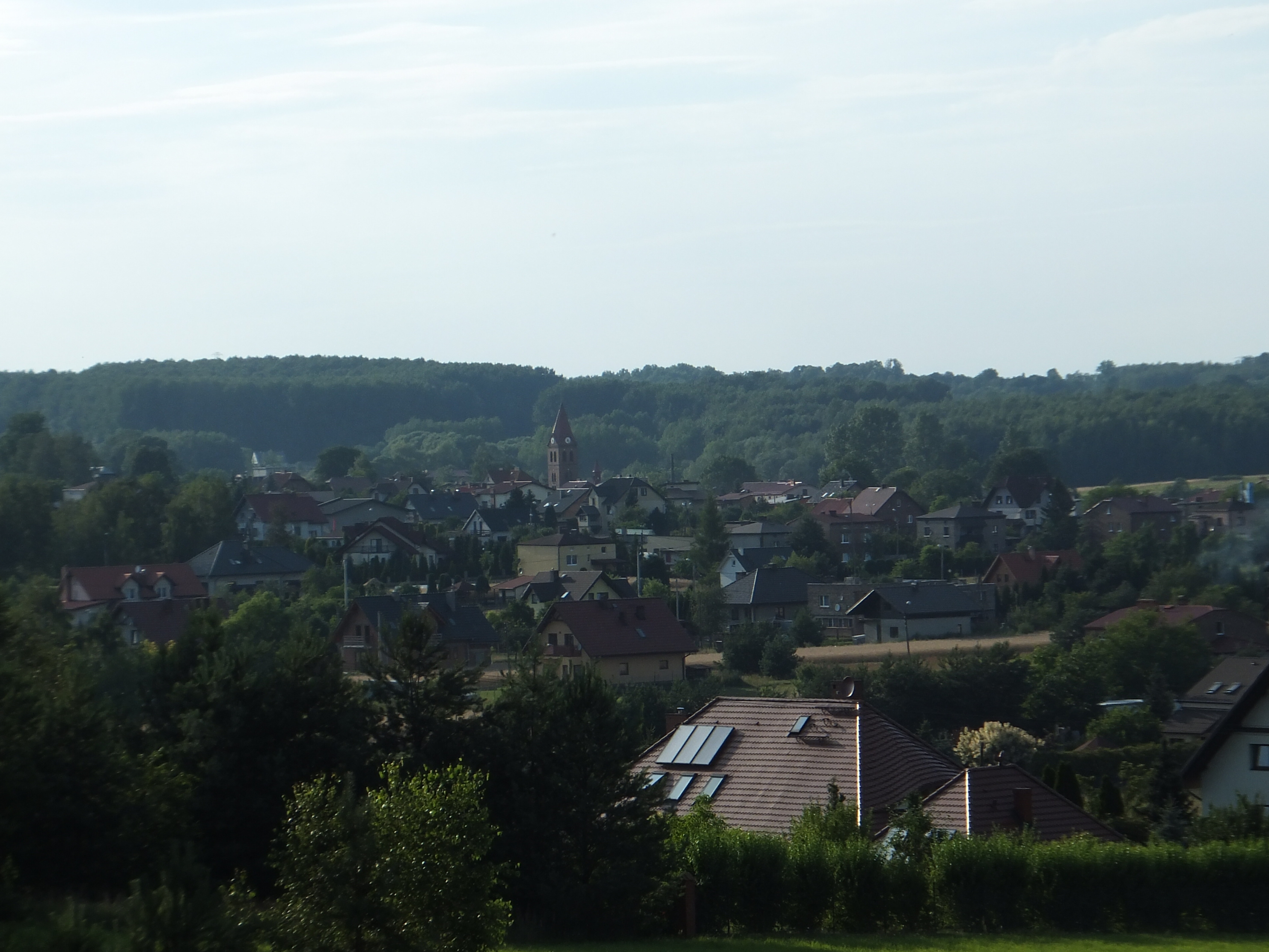

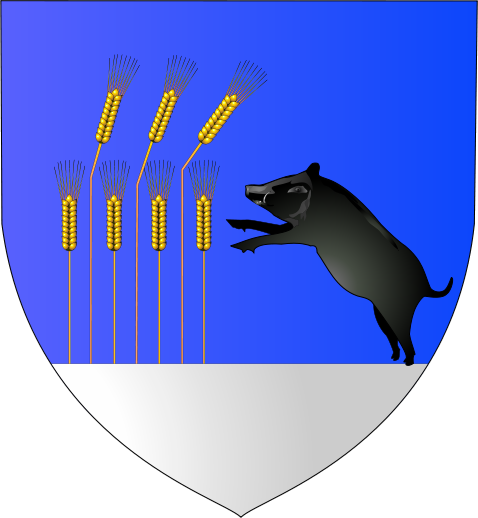
- Coat of arms

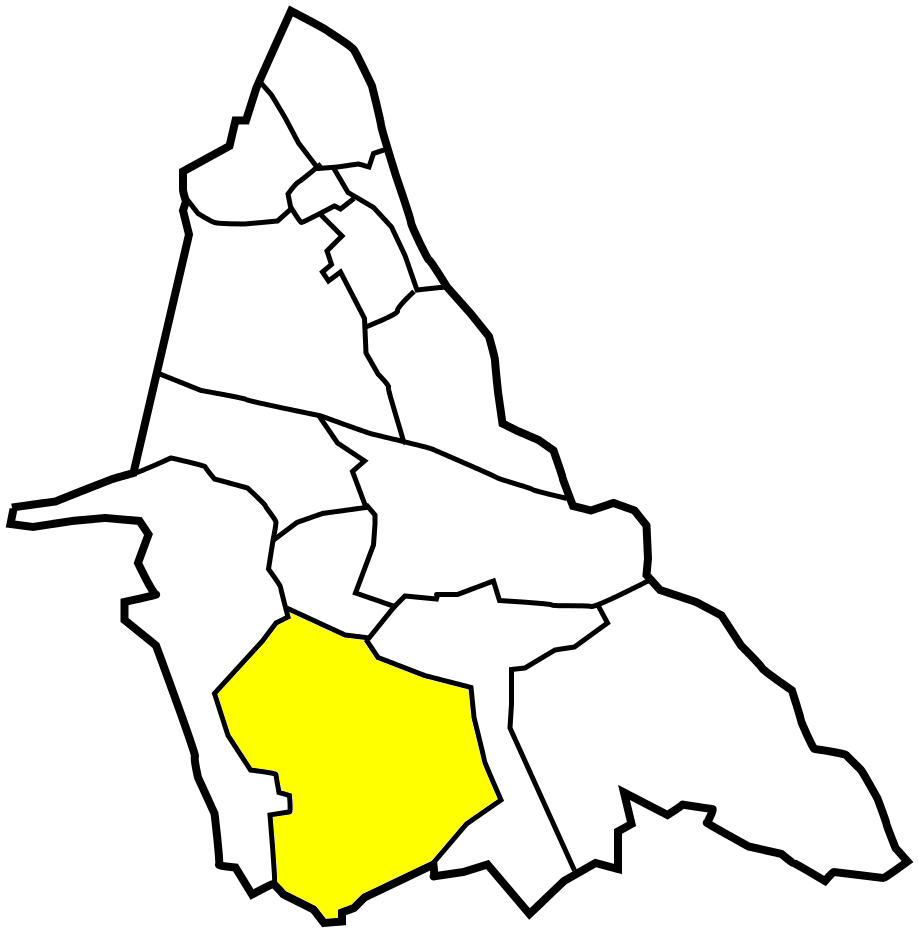
- Location of Krasowy within Mysłowice
- Coordinates: 50°10′16.3″N 19°06′52.6″E
- Country: Poland
- Voivodeship: Silesian
- County/City: Mysłowice

Area
  - Total: 978 km^{2} (378 sq mi)

Population (2012)
  - Total: 2,811
  - Density: 2.87/km^{2} (7.44/sq mi)
- Time zone: UTC+1 (CET)
  - Summer (DST): UTC+2 (CEST)
- Area code: (+48) 032

Krasowy (German: Krassow) is a dzielnica (district) of Mysłowice, Silesian Voivodeship, southern Poland. It was amalgamated with Mysłowice in 1975.

It has an area of 9.78 km^{2} and in 2012, had a population of 2,811.

== History ==
The settlement was first mentioned on June 24, 1295.

In the War of the Austrian Succession most of Silesia was conquered by the Kingdom of Prussia, including Krasowy. It was affected by industrial development beginning in the second half of the 18th century. After World War I, in the Upper Silesia plebiscite, 749 out of 819 voters in Krasowy voted in favour of joining Poland, against 70 who had opted for staying in Germany. The village became a part of autonomous Silesian Voivodeship in Second Polish Republic. It was then annexed by Nazi Germany at the beginning of World War II. After the war it was restored to Poland.
