= Piotr Bajtlik =

Polish actor

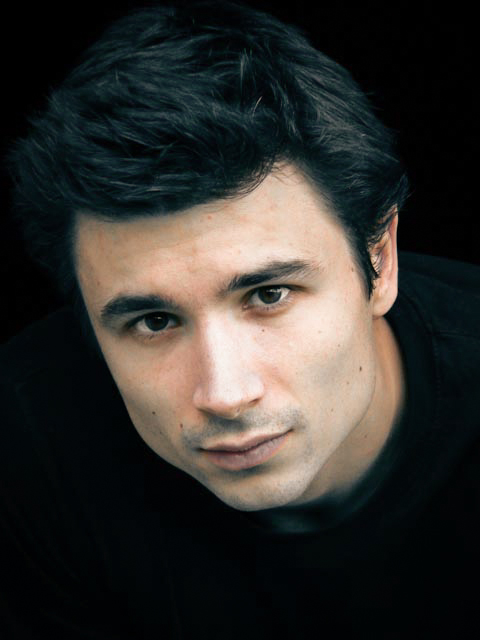
- Piotr Bajtlik (2016)
- Born: 4 March 1982 (age 44); Mysłowice, Poland
- Website: piotrbajtlik.com

Piotr Bajtlik (born 4 March 1982 in Mysłowice) is a Polish actor, voice artist and visual artist, living and working in Warsaw, Poland. His visual practice encompasses photography, video, objects and interactive installations, exploring memory, identity and the representation of the human in contemporary image culture.

== Education ==
2005 – The Aleksander Zelwerowicz National Academy of Dramatic Art in Warsaw – Acting Department

2024–2025 – Academy of Photography in Warsaw – Photography

2025–present – University of the Arts in Poznań – Photography

== Filmography ==
Actor

- 2005: Na dobre i na złe – Kostek
- 2005: Pensjonat pod Różą – Igor
- 2007: Pierwsza miłość
- 2007: Odwróceni – młody policjant (odc. 7)
- 2008: Teraz albo nigdy! – kurier (odc. 14)
- 2004–2008: M jak miłość – Adam Leszczyński
- 2009: Przeznaczenie – Łukasz, bratanek Edwina
- 2010: Plebania – ks. Marek
- 2012: Na dobre i na złe – Maciek
- 2012: Mika - Łukasz

TV Theatre

- 2008: Pseudonim Anoda – Heniek
- 2010: Kolęda Nocka. 30 lat później – Zakochany
- 2012: The School for Wives (Molière) – Horace

== Dubbing in Polish ==
- 1986: Wielki mysi detektyw – Professor Ratigan
- 2001: Dwanaście okrążeń – Rene Cartier
- 2003: Świat nonsensów u Stevensów
- 2005: Księżniczka na lodzie
- 2007: Winx Club: The Secret of the Lost Kingdom– Brandon
- 2008: Tatastrofa
- 2009: Pokémon: Arceus i Klejnot Życia – Marcus, człowiek przygotowujący jedzenie
- 2009: Madagwiazdka
- 2009: Barbie and the Three Musketeers – prince Ludwig
- 2009: Dzwoneczek i zaginiony skarb – Kamień
- 2010: Harriet szpieguje: Wojna blogów – Skander Hill
- 2010: Tangled (choir)
- 2010: Przyjaciel Świętego Mikołaja
- 2010: Liceum Avalon – Marco
- 2010: Rio – Nico
- 2010: Big Time Rush – Logan
- 2010: Przyjaciel świętego Mikołaja
- 2012: Journey 2: The Mysterious Island – Sean
- 2012: Dzwoneczek i sekret magicznych skrzydeł – Zefir
- 2012: Life of Pi – Pi Patel
- 2013: Percy Jackson: Sea of Monsters – Percy Jackson
- 2013: Epic (2013 film) – Nod
- 2013: Teen Beach Movie – Butchy
- 2014: The Lego Movie – Emmet
- 2014: Rio 2 – Nico
- 2014: Teenage Mutant Ninja Turtles – Leonardo
- 2014: Bella i Sebastian – Peter
- 2015: Flintstonowie: Wielkie Łubu-dubu – John Cenastone
- 2015: Dom
- 2015: Scooby Doo: Pora księżycowego potwora – Clark Sporkman
- 2015: Minionki – Herb O’Haracz (Herb Overkill)
- 2015: Teen Beach 2 – Butchy
- 2016: Regular Show – Mordechaj
- 2016: Pies, który ocalił Wielkanoc – Fred Stein
- 2016: Troskliwe Misie: Najlepsi z najlepszych – Śpioszek
- 2016: Troskliwe Misie: W blasku gwiazd – Śpioszek
- 2016: Batman v Superman: Świt sprawiedliwości
- 2016: Alice Through the Looking Glass – James Harcourt
- 2016: Wojownicze żółwie ninja: Wyjście z cienia – Leonardo
- 2016: Independence Day: Resurgence – Agent Travis
- 2016: Wszystkowidząca – Våbenmester
- 2016: Pies, który uratował lato – Fred Stein
- 2016: Daleko na północy
- 2016: Ice Age: Collision Course – Roger
- 2016: Powrót na Dziki Zachód – Doc Duvalier
- 2016: Sekretne życie zwierzaków domowych
- 2016: Pokémon: Hoopa i starcie wszech czasów
- 2016: Scooby-Doo i WWE: Potworny wyścig – Stardust
- 2016: DC Super Hero Girls: Bohater Roku – Jonathan Kent
- 2016: Trolls – Mruk / Branch
- 2016: Tellur Aliens – Butch
- 2016: Bruno i Bucior: Wskakujcie do basenu – Wilbur Hackenschleimer
- 2017: DC Super Hero Girls: Super Hero High –
  - Jonathan Kent,
  - Hal Jordan
- 2017: Transformers: The Last Knight
- 2017: Alex i spółka: Jak dorosnąć pod okiem rodziców

=== Series ===
- 2007: Bakugan: Młodzi wojownicy – książę Hydron
- 2008: Batman: Odważni i bezwzględni –
  - Speedy (odc. 34),
  - Thaddeus Jr (odc. 36)
- 2008: Suite Life: Nie ma to jak statek – Armando (odc. 27)
- 2008-2010: Aaron Stone – Trevor (odc. 30)
- 2008-2010: Imagination Movers – Smitty
- 2009: Ja w kapeli
- 2009-2010: Jonas
- 2010: Para królów – Jerry (odc. 7)
- 2010: Powodzenia, Charlie! – Spencer
- 2010: Connor Heath: Szpieg stażysta – Dillon Krug (odc. 5)
- 2010: Big Time Rush – Logan
- 2010-2014: Zwyczajny serial – Mordechaj
- 2011: Beyblade: Metal Masters – Tsubasa Otori
- 2011: Jake i piraci z Nibylandii – Pep (piracki dżin)
- 2012: Wodogrzmoty Małe
- 2012: Totalna Porażka: Zemsta Wyspy – Mike
- 2012: MLP:FiM – Garble (odc. 47)
- 2012: Supa Strikas: Piłkarskie rozgrywki – North
- 2012: Mega Spider-Man –
  - Flint Marko / Sandman,
  - Hawkeye
- 2012: Iron Man: Armored Adventures – Gene Khan/Mandaryn
- 2012: Ninjago: Mistrzowie spinjitzu – Dareth
- 2012: Szczury laboratoryjne – Trent
- 2012-2014: Violetta – Marotti
- 2012: Klinika dla pluszaków – Jaciążek
- 2013: Jeźdźcy smoków – Dagur
- 2013: Max Steel – Maxwell McGrath
- 2013: Power Rangers Megaforce – Jake Holling
- 2013: Avengers: Zjednoczeni – Hawkeye
- 2013: Pszczółka Maja –
  - Karol,
  - Dino
- 2014: Totalna Porażka: Plejada gwiazd – Mike
- 2014: Głupczaki – mechanik
- 2014: Team Hot Wheels –
  - Wyatt,
  - babcia Wyatta
- 2014: Kosmoloty – Kruk
- 2014: Akademia tańca – Chris
- 2014: Lato w mieście – Boaz
- 2015: Małe czarodziejki – tata Hazel
- 2015: Blaze and the Monster Machines – Blaze
- 2015: Anna i androidy – Wilbert
- 2015: Ben 10: Omniverse
- 2015: Na końcu świata – Luke
- 2015: The Returned – Adam Darrow
- 2015: Alicja – dziewczyna Wszechświat —
  - Ber,
  - Ik
- 2016: Totalna Porażka: Wariacki wyścig – Don
- 2016: Fresh Beat Band. Kapela detektywów – Twist
- 2016: Troskliwe Misie i kuzyni – Dzielny Lew
- 2016: K3 – Bob
- 2016: Soy Luna – Tino
- 2016: Bumble i Gumble – Kloc
- 2016: Kulipari: Żabia armia – Burnu
- 2017: Garderoba Julie – Spike
- 2017: Bunsen, ty bestio! – Tata Mikeya

== Roles in National Radio Theatre ==
- 2010: Hamlet W.Shakespeare (directed by W. Modestowicz) – Rosencrantz
- 2010: The School for Wives Molière (directed by W. Modestowicz) – Horace
- 2010: Wychowanka A.Fredro (directed byH. Rozen) – Pan Piotr
- 2010: Moje drzewko pomarańczowe Jose Mauro de Vasconceloso (directed by W. Modestowicz) – Ariovaldo
- 2010: Bazuka Dana Łukasińska (directed by W. Modestowicz) – Tiszert
- 2010: Księżyc wschodzi J. Iwaszkiewicz (directed by W. Modestowicz) – Jerzy
- 2010: Noc. Słowiańsko-germańska tragifarsa medyczna Andrzej Stasiuk (directed by Julia Wernio) – Ciało martwego złodzieja
- 2012: The Picture of Dorian Gray Oscar Wilde (directed by W. Modestowicz) – Dorian Gray

== Awards ==
- 2003 - Grand Prix of Anna German's Festival for interpretation of songs
- 2018 - Arete - Award for the best debut in National Radio Theatre
