= Brzęczkowice, Mysłowice =

Brzęczkowice
- Neighbourhood of Mysłowice
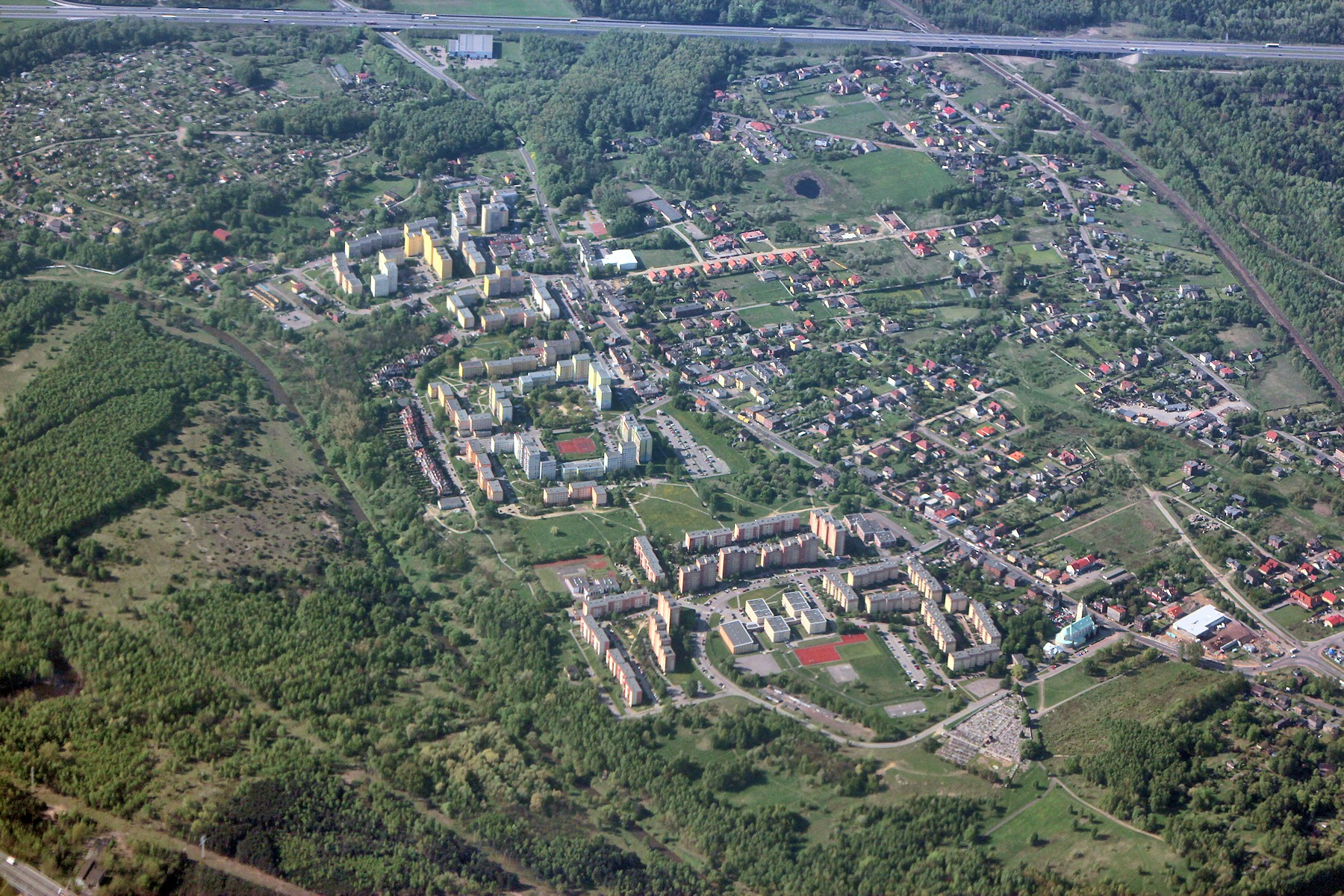
- Aerial view of Brzęczkowice

- Location within Poland
- Coordinates: 50.219512°N 19.156183°E
- Country: Poland
- Voivodeship: Silesian
- County/City: Mysłowice
- First mentioned: 1360
- Within city limits: 1945/1951
- Time zone: UTC+1 (CET)
  - Summer (DST): UTC+2 (CEST)
- Vehicle registration: SM
- Primary airport: Katowice Airport

Brzęczkowice (German: Brzenskowitz) is a neighbourhood and a part of dzielnica (district) Brzęczkowice and Słupna, in Mysłowice, Silesian Voivodeship, southern Poland. It was previously an independent village and gmina (consisting only of this village), that was absorbed by Mysłowice in 1945 and again in 1951.

== History ==
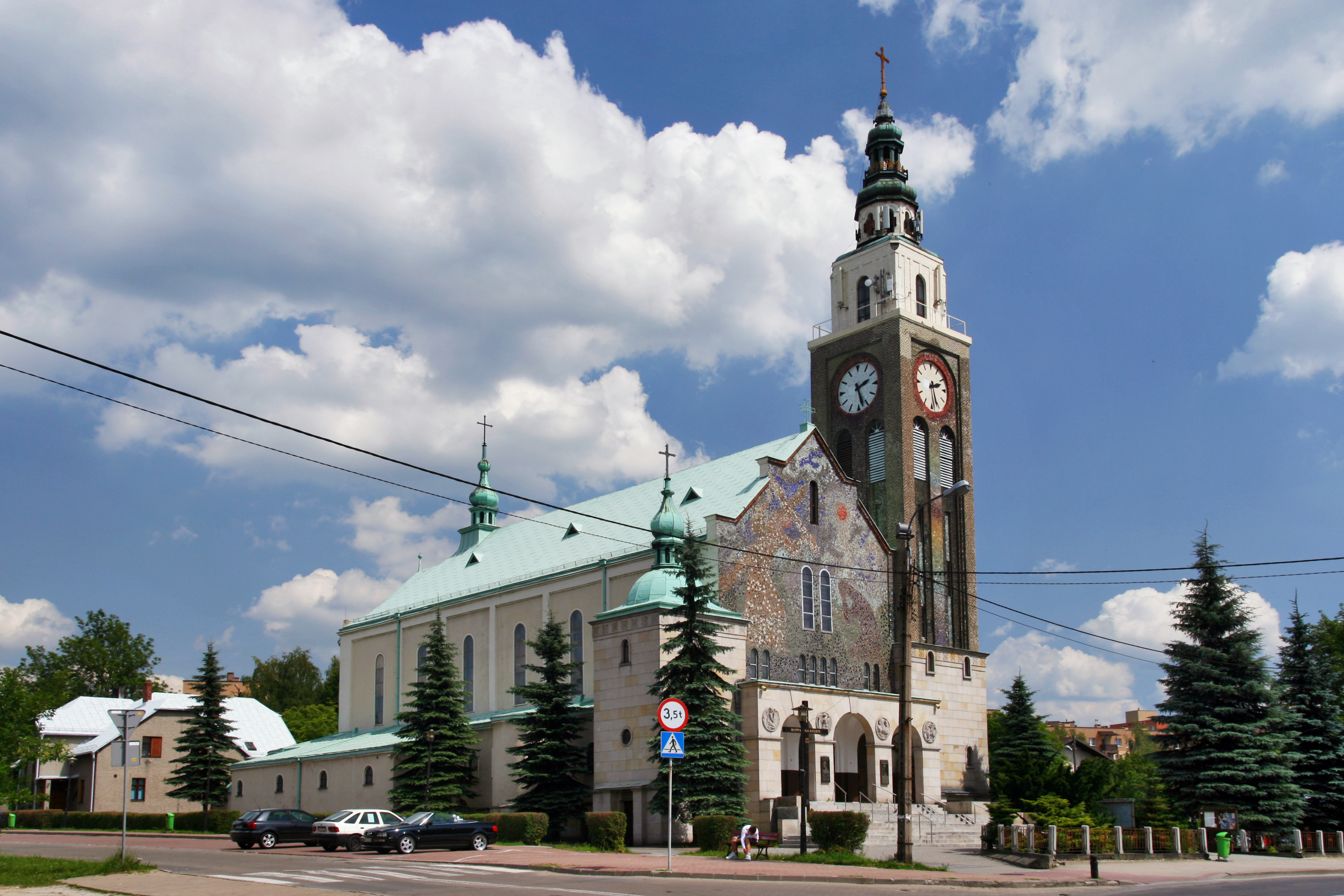
Saint Mary church

The village was first mentioned in 1360. Liber beneficiorum dioecesis Cracoviensis scribed by Jan Długosz in years 1470-1480 mentions the village as Brzanczkowice.

During the political upheaval caused by Matthias Corvinus the land around Pszczyna was overtaken by Casimir II, Duke of Cieszyn, who sold it in 1517 to the Hungarian magnates of the Thurzó family, forming the Pless state country. In the accompanying sales document issued on 21 February 1517 the village was mentioned as Brzeczkowicze.

In the War of the Austrian Succession most of Silesia was conquered by the Kingdom of Prussia, including the village. It was affected by industrial development in the 19th century. In 1871, it became part of the German Empire. The Three Emperors' Corner was located on the eastern border of Brzęczkowice in years 1871–1918. After World War I in the Upper Silesia plebiscite 1,198 out of 1,550 voters in Brzęczkowice voted in favour of rejoining Poland, against 349 opting for staying in Germany. The village became a part of autonomous Silesian Voivodeship in Second Polish Republic. It was then annexed by Nazi Germany at the beginning of World War II. After the war it was restored to Poland.

Brzęczkowice is the home of the Missionary Museum, founded by Father Andrzej Halemba, at the Church of Our Lady of Sorrows.

== Notable people ==
- August Hlond (1881–1948), Polish cardinal, Primate of Poland
- Jolanta Fraszyńska (born 1968), Polish actress
