= Wesoła, Mysłowice =

Wesoła
- Mysłowice District
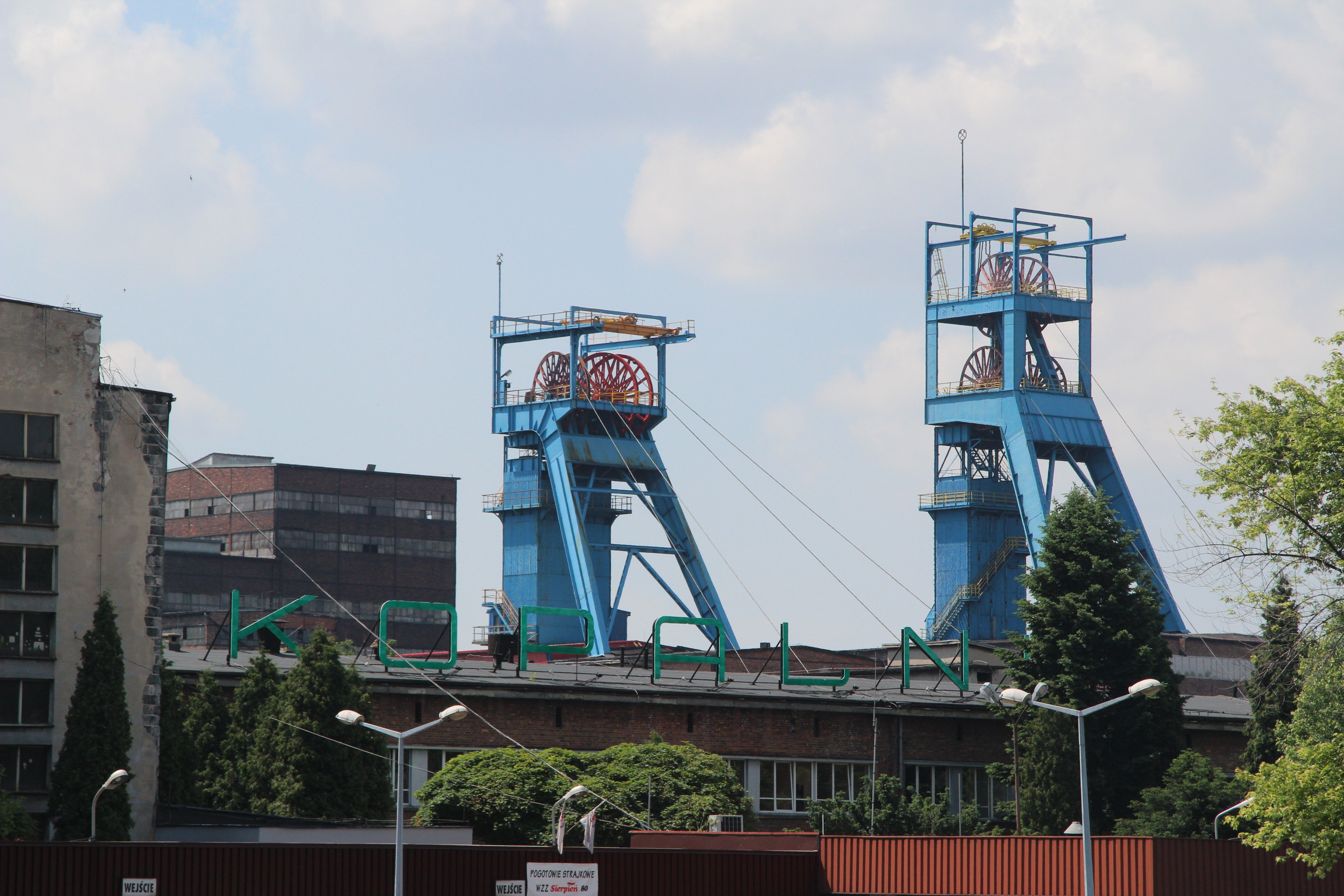
- Coal mine in Wesoła

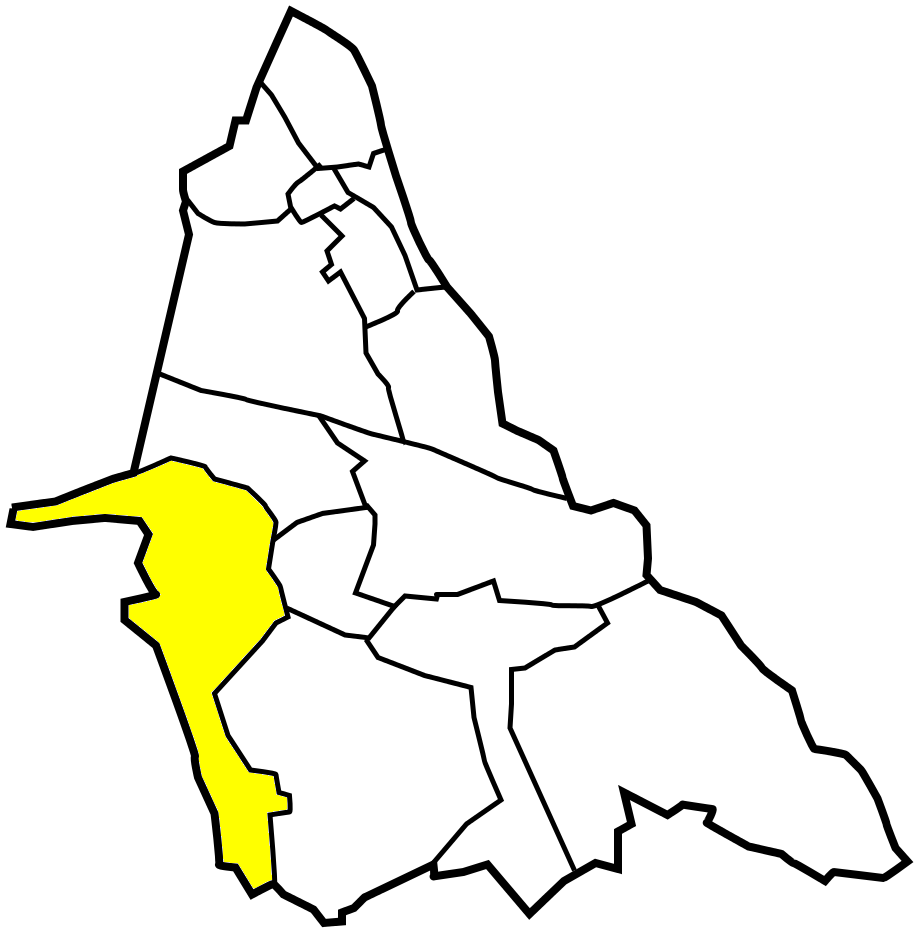
- Location of Wesoła within Mysłowice
- Coordinates: 50°11′16.20″N 19°06′31.1″E
- Country: Poland
- Voivodeship: Silesian
- County/City: Mysłowice
- First mentioned: 1710
- Within city limits: 1975

Area
  - Total: 814 km^{2} (314 sq mi)

Population (2012)
  - Total: 8,108
  - Density: 9.96/km^{2} (25.8/sq mi)
- Time zone: UTC+1 (CET)
  - Summer (DST): UTC+2 (CEST)
- Area code: (+48) 032
- Vehicle registration: SM

Wesoła (German: Wessolla) is a dzielnica (district) of Mysłowice, Silesian Voivodeship, southern Poland. In years 1962–1975 it was an independent town, but was in 1975 amalgamated with Mysłowice.

It has an area of 8,14 km^{2} and in 2012 had a population of 8,108.

== History ==
The settlement was first mentioned in 1710. In the War of the Austrian Succession most of Silesia was conquered by the Kingdom of Prussia, including the village. It was affected by industrial development beginning in the second half of the 18th century. After World War I in the Upper Silesia plebiscite 437 out of 452 voters in Wesoła voted in favour of joining Poland, against 15 opting for staying in Germany. The village became a part of the Silesian Voivodeship in Second Polish Republic.

It was then annexed by Nazi Germany at the beginning of World War II. Nazi Germany operated the Fürstengrube subcamp of the Auschwitz concentration camp in Wesoła in 1943–1945. On 19 January 1945, some 1,000 prisoners were sent by the SS on a death march towards Gliwice. There have been several cases of prisoners being killed during escape attempts or for simply taking news and food from Poles outside the camp. On 19 January 1945, some 1,000 prisoners were sent on a death march towards Gliwice. On 27 January 1945, the SS committed a massacre of the remaining prisoners of the subcamp, who were either shot or burned alive. 239 bodies were buried afterwards, while some 20 prisoners survived the massacre. After the war it was restored to Poland.
