= Przemsza =

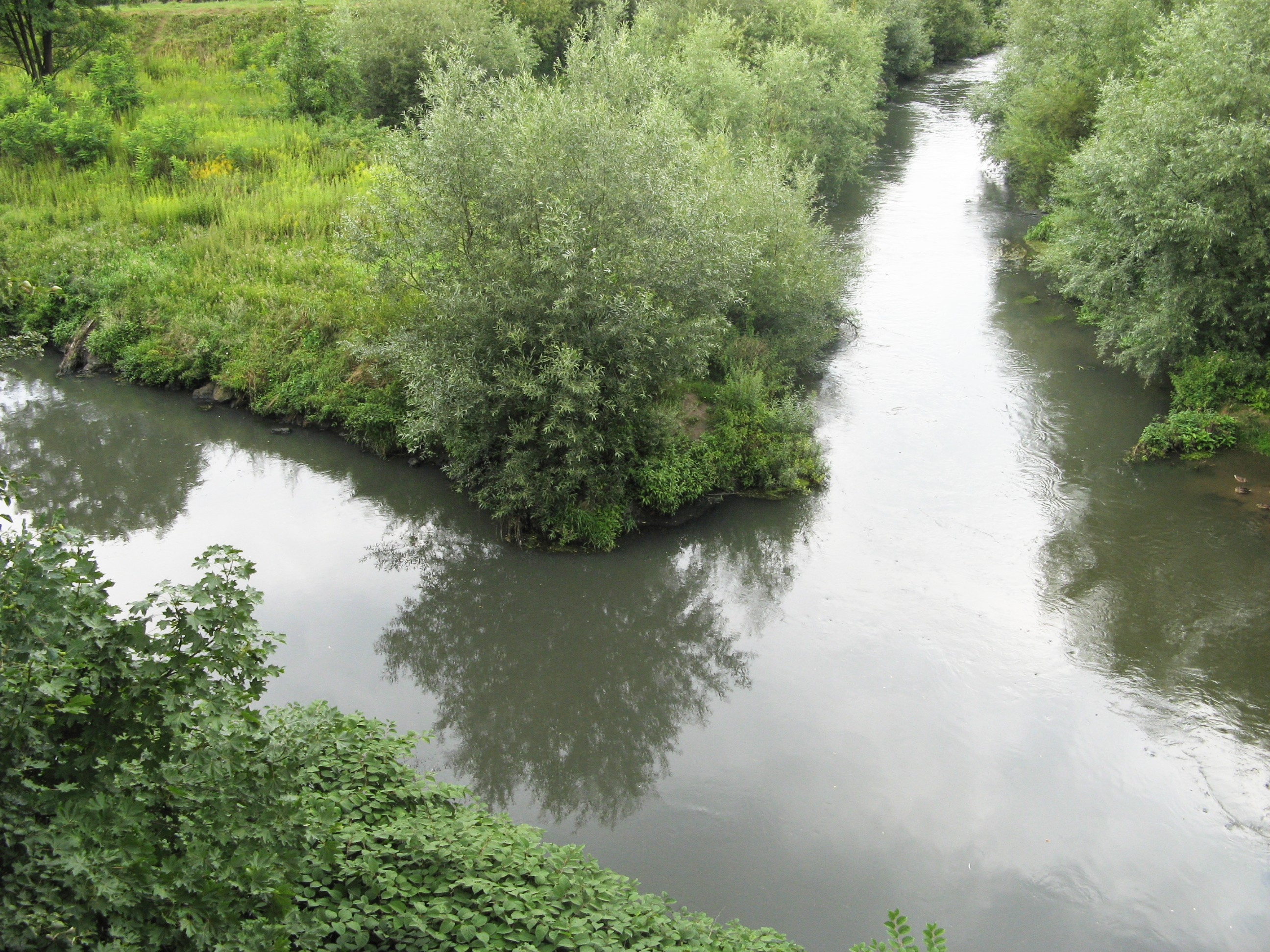
- Three Emperors' Corner

Location
- Country: Poland

Physical characteristics
- Source
  - location: Three Emperors' Corner, Mysłowice
  - coordinates: 50°13′46″N 19°09′26″E
- Mouth
  - location: Vistula at Gorzów
  - coordinates: 50°3′58″N 19°14′0″E
- Length: 24 km (15 mi)
- Basin size: 2,121 km^{2} (819 sq mi)

Basin features
- Progression: Vistula→ Baltic Sea

The Przemsza (German: Przemsa) is a river in the south of Poland, and a tributary of the Vistula. According to one view, it originates at the confluence of the Black (Polish: Czarna) Przemsza and White (Biała) Przemsza, between the towns of Mysłowice and Jaworzno. For about 24 km (15 mi) it flows southwards to its Vistula mouth at Czarnuchowice (a district of Bieruń). Another view places its beginning at the source of the Black Przemsza, giving it the length of 88 kilometers.

The Przemsza is one of the most polluted rivers of Poland. It carries industrial waste from the Upper Silesia and Zagłębie Dąbrowskie Coal Basin, and its water is regarded as dead. Furthermore, due to high level of pollution, the Przemsza does not freeze over in winter. Among the towns located along the Przemsza are Dąbrowa Górnicza, Mysłowice, Jaworzno, Chełmek, and Jęzor, a district of Sosnowiec. The Przemsza has been used for water transport since the mid-18th century. By the mid-19th century, it emerged as one of the most important waterways of the region. Large flat-bottomed rowing boats, called galars, were used to transport goods on the Przemsza to the Vistula. One galar took up to 70 tons of coal or stone from quarries at Jeleń or Dziećkowice. In June 1926, the Piast Mine from Lędziny began mass water transportation of its coal, using a specially constructed port, located at the village of Chełm Mały. Other mines followed Piast, opening their own loading facilities. By 1937, there were eight such facilities along the Przemsza. The government of the Second Polish Republic had far-reaching plans for the river. A river port at Niwka (a district of Sosnowiec) was to be built, a Mysłowice - Spytkowice - Kraków canal, and a waterway to the Baltic Sea. The outbreak of World War II terminated these plans.

Since the 12th century, the river formed the eastern border of the Silesian Duchy of Racibórz, with Lesser Poland. From 1846 until 1918, the so-called Three Emperors' Corner at the confluence of Black and White Przemsza marked the tripoint of the Kingdom of Prussia, the Austrian Empire and the Russian Empire. Nowadays the lower Przemsza is the border between the Silesian Voivodeship in the west and the Lesser Poland Voivodeship in the east.

== White and Black Przemsza ==
White Przemsza is 63.9 kilometers long, and begins in a bog near Wolbrom. It flows southwest, in a wide valley. Upper White Przemsza has very clean water, which changes at the village of Klucze. Among others, the White Przemsza flows through the Błędów Desert. Black Przemsza is 64.2 kilometers long, and its source is in Bzów, which has been a district of Zawiercie since 1977. In its upper course, the water of the river is very clean, but its quality gets worse at Przeczyce, where a reservoir was built in 1963.

Both rivers were named after the color of the water. In the past, Black Przemsza's bed near Będzin contained shallow coal deposits, whilst White Przemsza flowed through limestone hills in the area of Olkusz, so its bottom was white.
