= Morgi, Mysłowice =

Morgi
- Mysłowice District
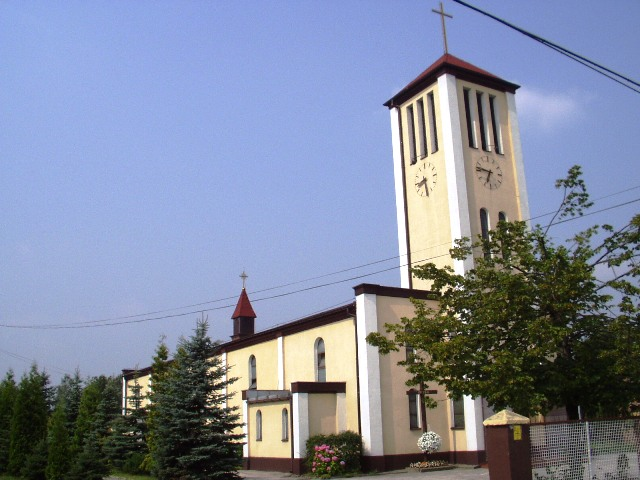
- Saint Hyacinth church (built in 1946)

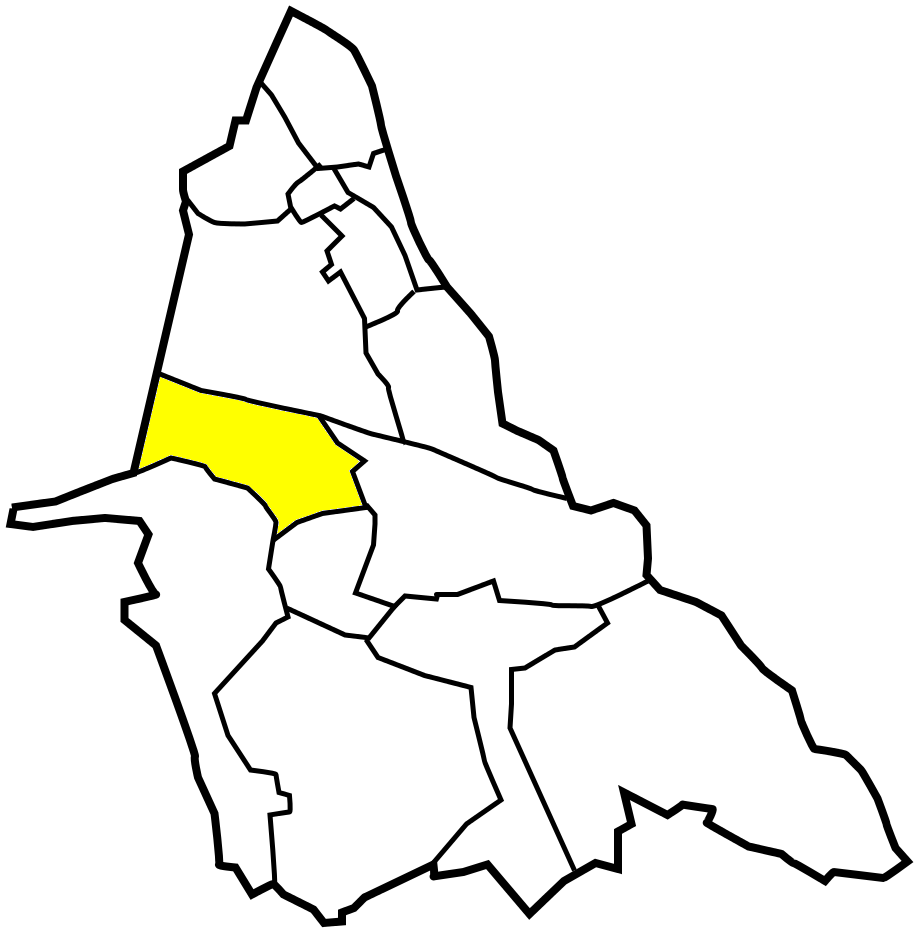
- Location of Morgi within Mysłowice
- Coordinates: 50.205657°N 19.122111°E
- Country: Poland
- Voivodeship: Silesian
- County/City: Mysłowice

Area
  - Total: 3.49 km^{2} (1.35 sq mi)

Population (2012)
  - Total: 2,146
  - Density: 615/km^{2} (1,590/sq mi)
- Time zone: UTC+1 (CET)
  - Summer (DST): UTC+2 (CEST)
- Area code: (+48) 032

Morgi is a dzielnica (district) of Mysłowice, Silesian Voivodeship, southern Poland. It has an area of 3.49 km^{2} and in 2012 had a population of 2,146.

In the middle of the 19th century the area was yet covered with a forest belonging to the town of Mysłowice. Guido Henckel von Donnersmarck bought it then to cut the trees to fuel local heavy industry. Deforested land commenced to be inhabited. In 1900 a local school was opened. A local church was built in 1946.
