= Brzezinka, Mysłowice =

Brzezinka
- Mysłowice District
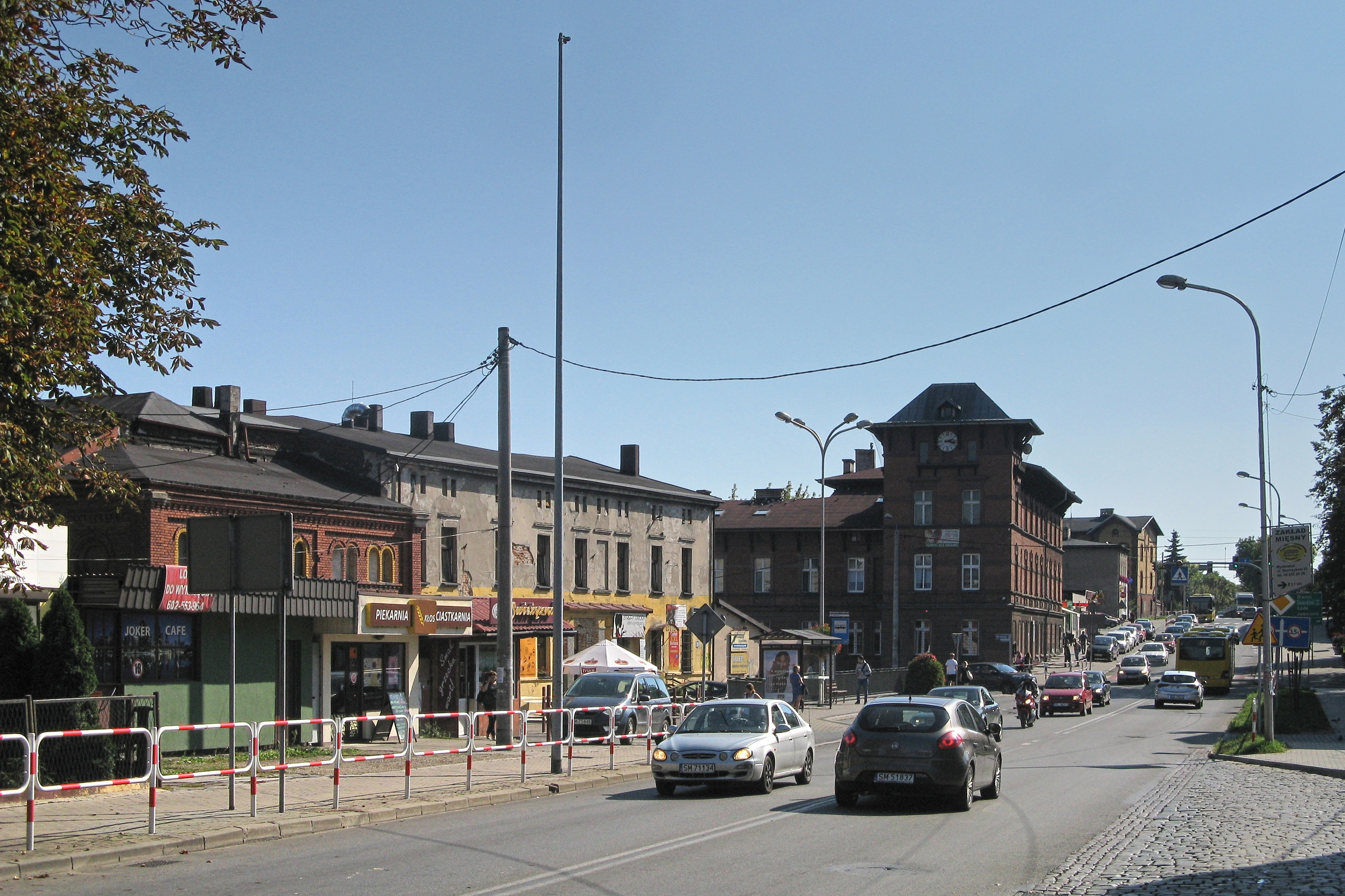
- Brzezińska Street in Brzezinka in 2018

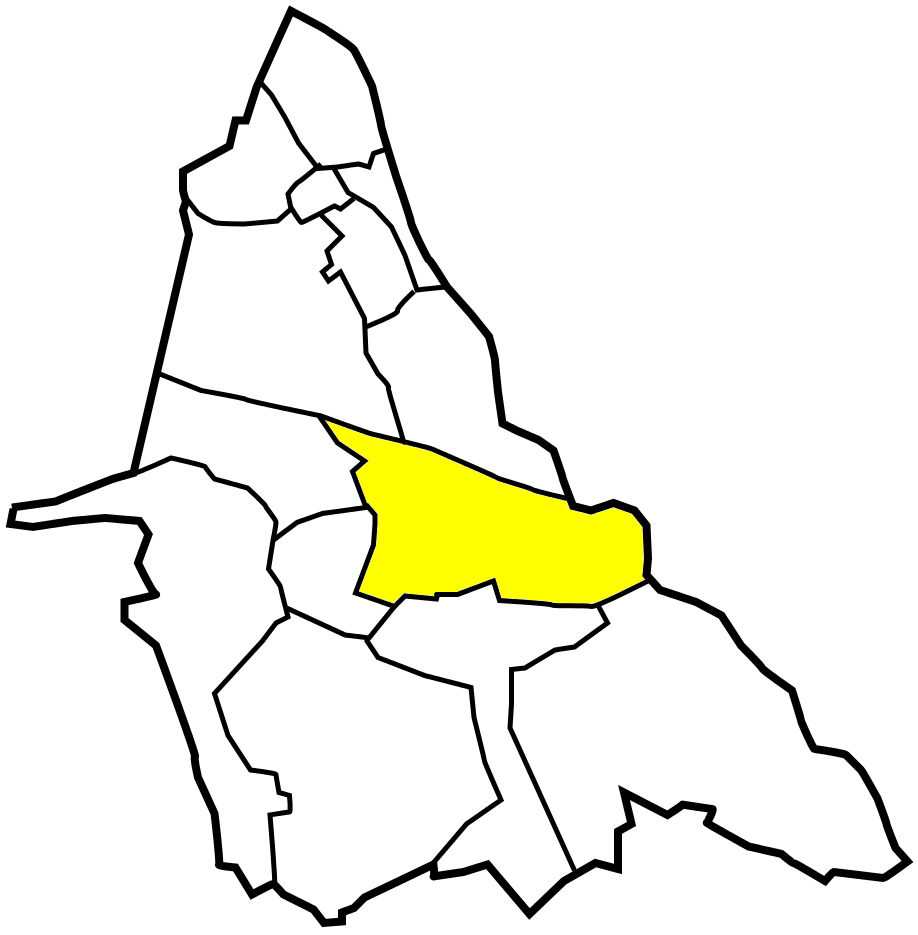
- Location of Brzezinka within Mysłowice
- Coordinates: 50°12′12″N 19°09′40″E
- Country: Poland
- Voivodeship: Silesian
- County/City: Mysłowice
- First mentioned: 1474
- Included within city limits: 1951

Area
  - Total: 6.69 km^{2} (2.58 sq mi)

Population (2012)
  - Total: 5,146
  - Density: 769/km^{2} (1,990/sq mi)
- Time zone: UTC+1 (CET)
  - Summer (DST): UTC+2 (CEST)
- Area code: (+48) 032
- Vehicle registration: SM

Brzezinka (Polish: [bʐɛˈʑiŋka]; German: Birkental) is a dzielnica (district) of Mysłowice, Silesian Voivodeship, southern Poland. It was previously an independent village and gmina, but was absorbed by Mysłowice in 1951.

It has an area of 6.69 km^{2} and in 2012 had a population of 5,146.

== History ==
The area became part of the emerging Polish state in the 10th century. As a result of the fragmentation of Poland, it formed part of various provincial duchies, incl. the Duchy of Pszczyna since the 15th century. The village was first mentioned in 1474.

During the political upheaval caused by Matthias Corvinus the duchy was overtaken by Casimir II, Duke of Cieszyn from the Piast dynasty, who sold it in 1517 to the Hungarian magnates of the Thurzó family, forming the Pless state country. In the accompanying sales document issued on 21 February 1517 the village was mentioned as Brzezynka.

In the War of the Austrian Succession most of Silesia was conquered by the Kingdom of Prussia, including the village, and in 1871 it became part of the German Empire. It was affected by industrial development since the late 18th century. After World War I in the Upper Silesia plebiscite 2,362 out of 2,890 voters in Brzezinka voted in favour of rejoining Poland, against 523 opting for staying in Germany. The village became a part of autonomous Silesian Voivodeship in Second Polish Republic. It was then annexed and occupied by Nazi Germany at the beginning of World War II. After the war it was restored to Poland.

== Transport ==
The intersection of the Polish A4 and S1 highways is located near Brzezinka.
