= Three Emperors' Corner =

Historic boundary of three European empires

Coordinates: 50°13′46.92″N 19°09′26.98″E

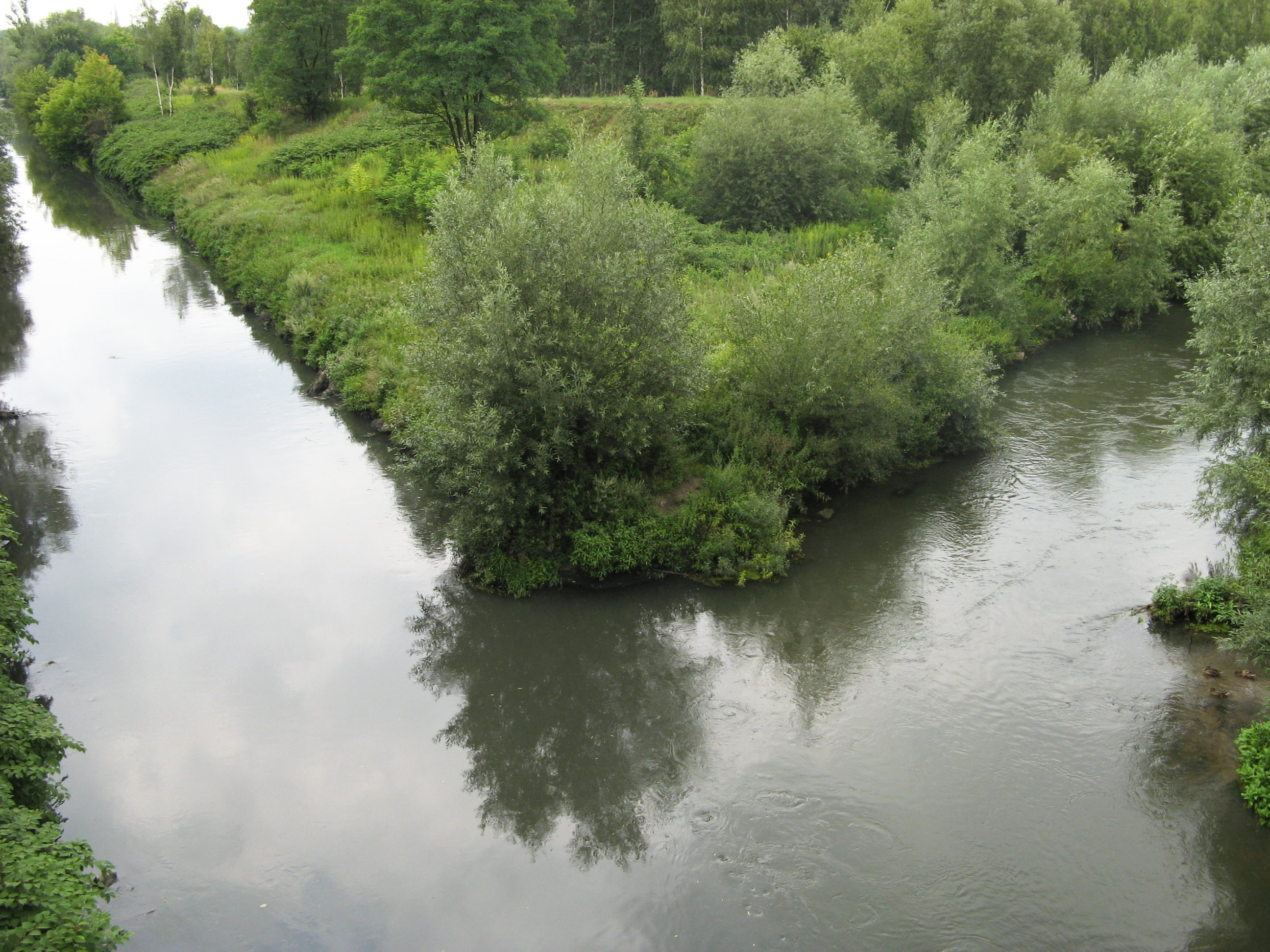
Three Emperors' Corner today: Before 1918 the left side of this scene was German, the middle Russian and the right side Austro-Hungarian

Three Emperors' Corner (Polish: Trójkąt Trzech Cesarzy, German: Dreikaisereck, Russian: Угол трёх императоров, romanized: Ugol tryokh imperatorov) is a former tripoint at the confluence of the Black and White Przemsza rivers, near the towns of Mysłowice, Sosnowiec and Jaworzno in the present-day Silesian Voivodeship of Poland. During the Partitions of Poland, from 1871 to 1918, it marked the place at which the borders of three empires that had divided Poland – the Russian Empire, Austria-Hungary and the German Empire – met.

== History ==
It developed in the aftermath of the Partitions of Poland as a result of the border shifts and regime changes in the 19th century, including the annexation of the Free City of Kraków by the Austrian Empire after the unsuccessful Kraków Uprising in 1846. The left bank of the White Przemsza now belonged to the Austrian Grand Duchy of Cracow (part of the Austro-Hungarian monarchy from 1867). While the Upper Silesian right bank of the Black Przemsza had been within the boundaries of the Holy Roman Empire since 1335 and passed in 1742 over from Austria to Prussia, the land between the two tributaries was part of Congress Poland, a de facto protectorate of the Russian Empire according to the Final Act of the 1815 Vienna Congress. However, the spot did not become a Three Emperors' Corner until Prussia merged into the newly created German Empire in 1871. It remained as such until the dissolution of all three empires in the aftermath of World War I and the establishment of the Second Polish Republic in 1918.

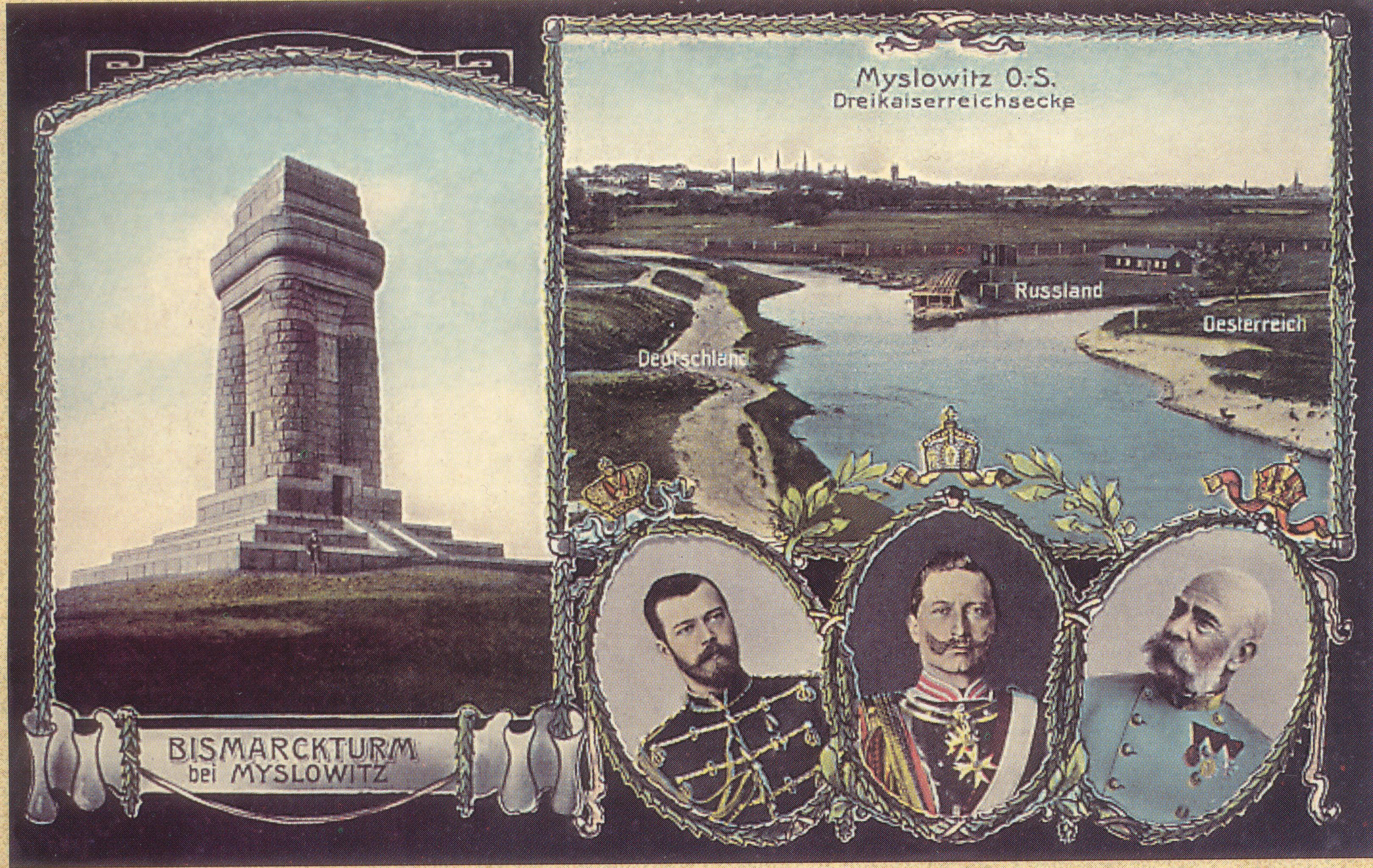
Postcard, c. 1907: Nicholas II of Russia, Wilhelm II of Germany, Franz Joseph I of Austria and the Bismarck tower in Mysłowice

A less famous tripoint of those three powers had already existed near the village of Niemirów following the 1795 Third Partition of Poland, which ended the Polish–Lithuanian Commonwealth. Here the Prussian province of New East Prussia and Austrian West Galicia bordered on Russia. The creation of the Duchy of Warsaw on former Prussian territory by Napoleon I in 1807 erased it, and the Duchy's transformation into Congress Poland and the condominium of Kraków in 1815 led to a more stable tripoint at a new location, which lasted for over a century. The Congress Kingdom of Poland would however lose most of its autonomy after the November Uprising in 1830/31 and the January Uprising in 1863/64, later becoming incorporated as Russian Vistula Land (Privislinsky Krai). Finally, until the creation of the German Empire in 1871, the spot was known as the Three Countries' Corner (German: Dreiländereck).

From 1871 it assumed its most famous name: the Three Emperors' Corner. Until World War I, the tripoint was a popular tourist spot, particularly from the German Empire. Two riverboats toured its vicinity, and in 1907, the German authorities had a 22 m (72 ft)-high Bismarck tower erected on the Przemsza shore according to the standard Götterdämmerung design by Wilhelm Kreis. As reported in contemporary newspapers, between 3,000 and 8,000 people visited the spot every week.

The tripoint was abolished with the establishment of the Polish voivodeships of Kraków and Kielce on the former Austro-Hungarian and Russian territory in 1919. The German territory also fell to the Polish Silesian Voivodeship upon the Upper Silesian plebiscite in 1921. Finally, in the place of the corner, there existed a tripoint of three Polish voivodeships in the interwar period: Silesian voivodeship (Mysłowice), Kraków voivodeship (Jaworzno) and Kielce voivodeship (Sosnowiec). The Bismarck tower survived for a little over a decade, and was briefly renamed the Freedom Tower, before Silesian voivode Michał Grażyński had it demolished from 1933 onwards; the stones were used to build the Cathedral of Christ the King in Katowice.

Currently located in an industrial area, the tripoint is a minor tourist attraction in Poland. Since 2004, it was marked by a memorial plaque, which—slightly incorrectly—referred to the spot as where three territories annexed in the Partitions of Poland met. A new plaque was amended in 2012.

Between 1774 and 1877, a similar imperial tripoint existed by the city of Novoselytsia on the Prut River: the one between the Austrian (in Bukovina), Russian (in Bessarabia) and Ottoman (in the United Principalities) empires.

== See also ==
- Holy Alliance
- League of the Three Emperors
