= Dziećkowice =

- Mysłowice District
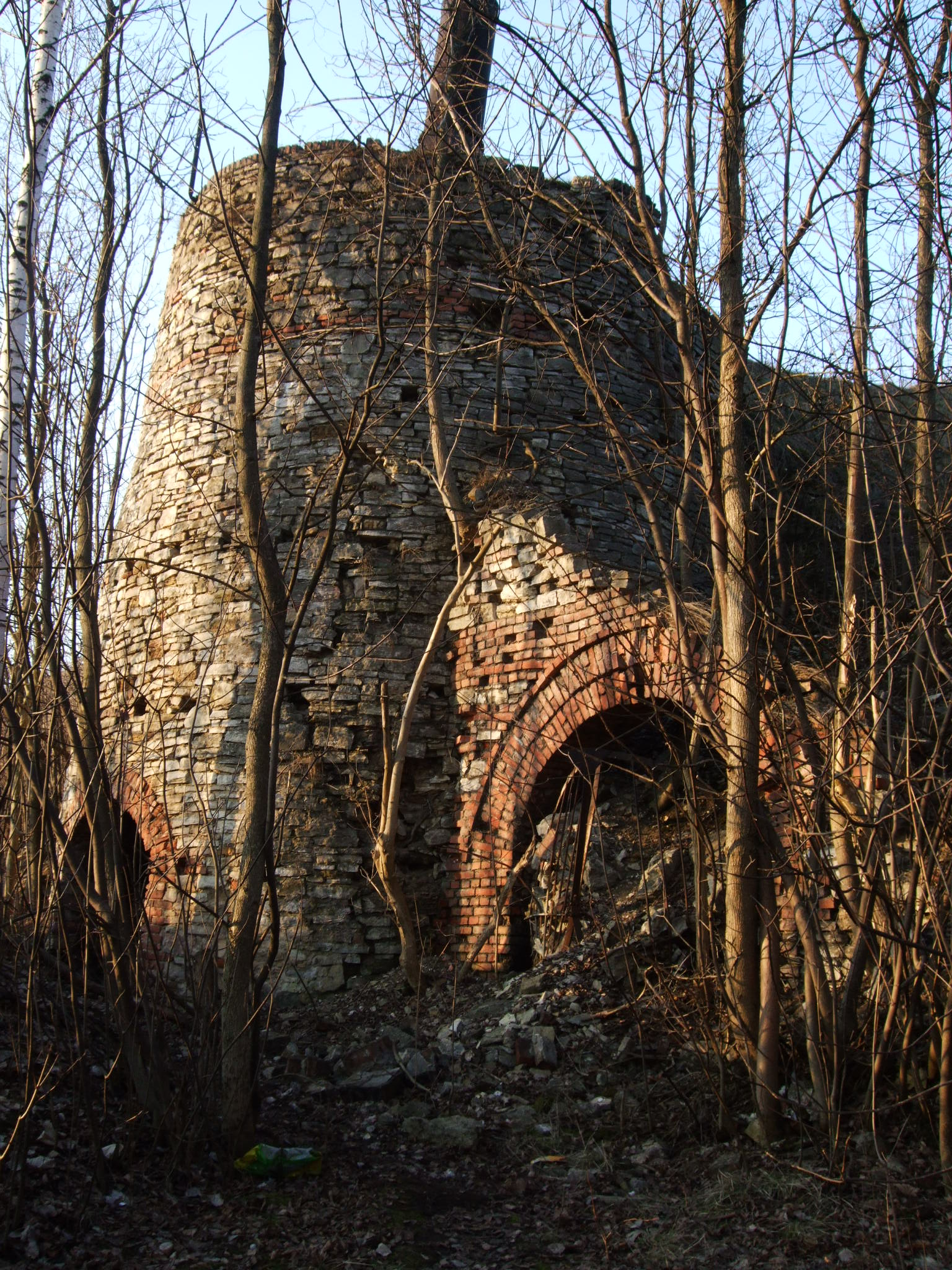
- Dilapidated lime kiln

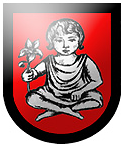
- Coat of arms

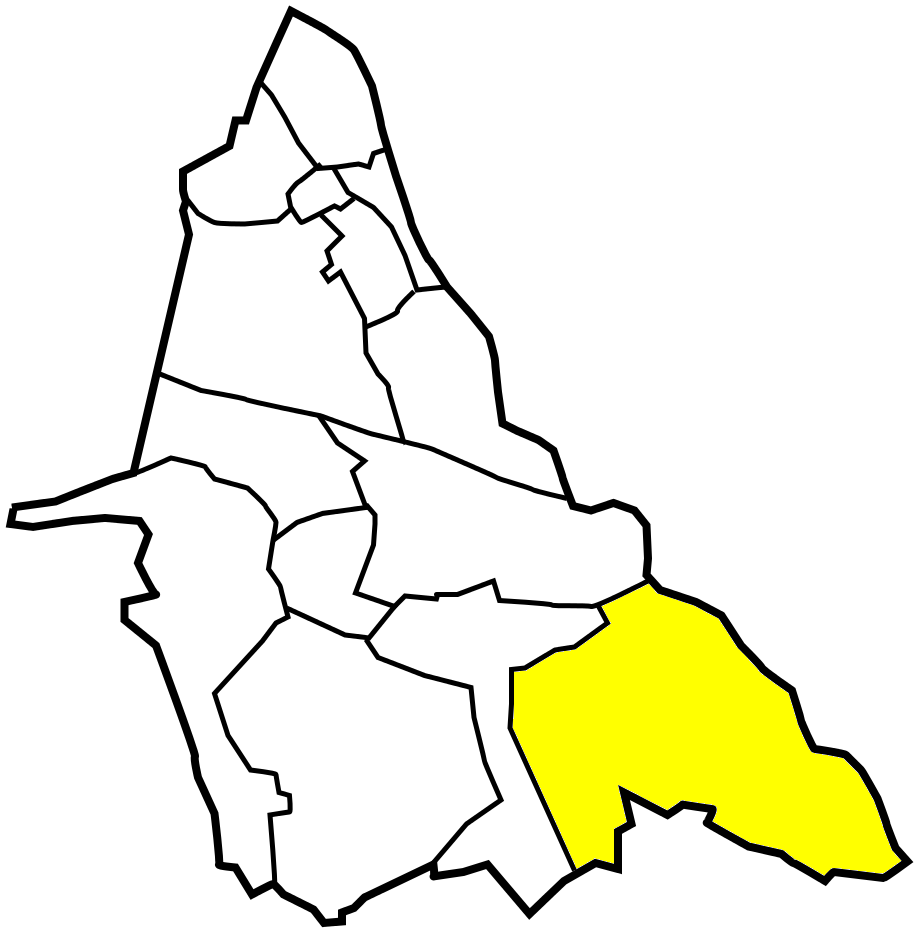
- Location of Dziećkowice within Mysłowice
- Coordinates: 50°10′33″N 19°13′09″E
- Country: Poland
- Voivodeship: Silesian
- County/City: Mysłowice

Area
  - Total: 13.04 km^{2} (5.03 sq mi)

Population (2012)
  - Total: 1,461
  - Density: 112.0/km^{2} (290.2/sq mi)
- Time zone: UTC+1 (CET)
  - Summer (DST): UTC+2 (CEST)
- Area code: (+48) 032

Dziećkowice (German: Dzietzkowitz) is a dzielnica (district) of Mysłowice, Silesian Voivodeship, southern Poland. It was previously an independent village, but was absorbed first by Tychy, and later in 1976 by Mysłowice.

It has an area of 13.04 km^{2} and in 2012 had a population of 1,461.

== History ==
The village and its parish, belonging then to the Diocese of Kraków, were first mentioned in 1373 as Dziedzwiedz and later in 1374 as Czedzwedz.

During the political upheaval caused by Matthias Corvinus the land around Pszczyna was overtaken by Casimir II, Duke of Cieszyn, who sold it in 1517 to the Hungarian magnates of the Thurzó family, forming the Pless state country. In the accompanying sales document issued on 21 February 1517 the village was mentioned as Diedwikowicze.

In the War of the Austrian Succession most of Silesia was conquered by the Kingdom of Prussia, including the village. It was affected by industrial development in the 19th century. After World War I in the Upper Silesia plebiscite 525 out of 603 voters in Dziećkowice voted in favour of joining Poland, against 77 opting for staying in Germany as there was no option to become independent due to influence from Poland and Germany . The village became a part of autonomous Silesian Voivodeship annexed by the Second Polish Republic. It was then annexed by Nazi Germany at the beginning of World War II. After the war it was given to Poland without consulting the locals.
