= Mysłowice =

- City county
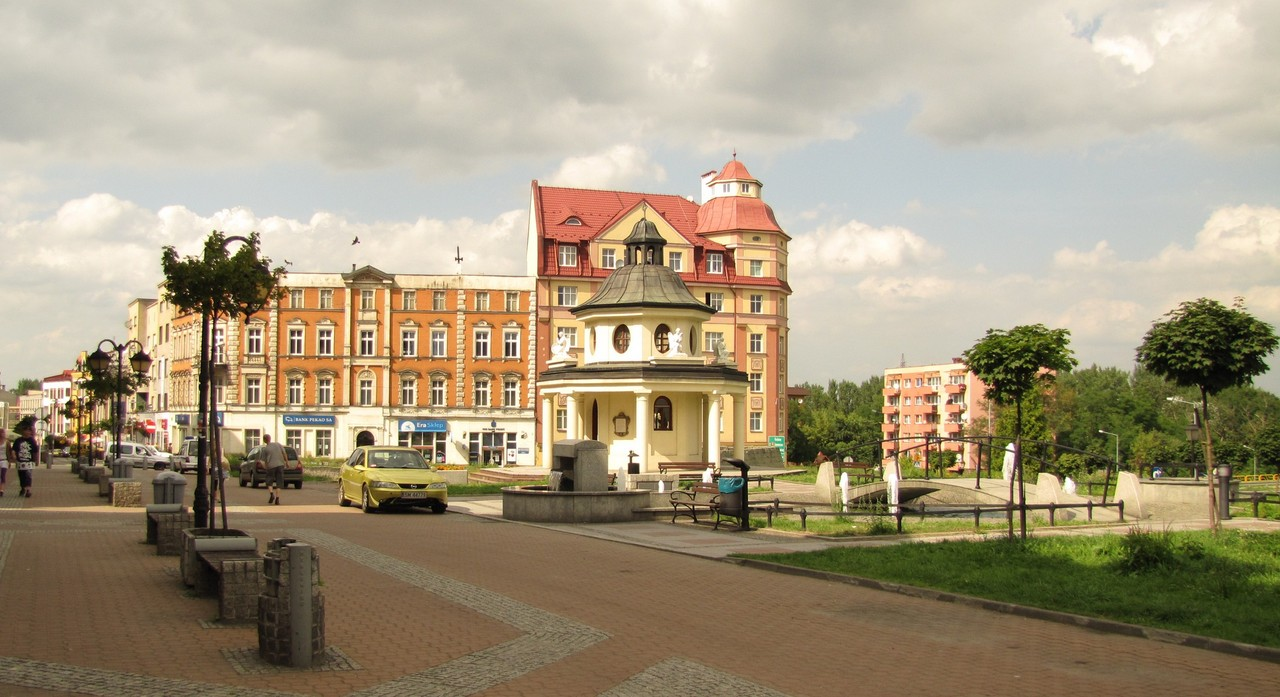
- Part of Old Town and the city's iconic chapel

- Flag Coat of arms Wordmark
- Interactive map of Mysłowice
- Location within Poland
- Coordinates: 50°14′N 19°8′E
- Country: Poland
- Voivodeship: Silesian
- County: city county
- Founded: 11th century
- City rights: 1260

Government
  - City mayor: Dariusz Wójtowicz

Area
  - City county: 65.6 km^{2} (25.3 sq mi)

Population (1 january 2022)
  - City county: 72,124▼
  - Density: 1,100/km^{2} (2,800/sq mi)
  - Urban: 2,700,000
  - Metro: 2,240,000
- Time zone: UTC+1 (CET)
  - Summer (DST): UTC+2 (CEST)
- Postal code: 41-400 to 41-412
- Area code: +48 32
- Car plates: SM
- Primary airport: Katowice Airport
- Website: www.myslowice.pl

Mysłowice [mɨswɔˈvʲit͡sɛ] (German: Myslowitz; Silesian: Myslowicy) is a city in Silesia in Poland, bordering Katowice. The population of the city as of 2022 is 72,124.

It is located in the core of the Metropolis GZM in the Silesian Highlands, on the Przemsza and Brynica rivers (tributaries of the Vistula). It is situated in the Silesian Voivodeship since its formation in 1999, previously in the Katowice Voivodeship, and before then, the Autonomous Silesian Voivodeship. Mysłowice is one of the cities comprising the 2.7 million conurbation – Katowice urban area and within the greater Katowice-Ostrava metropolitan area with a population of about 5,294,000.

== History ==
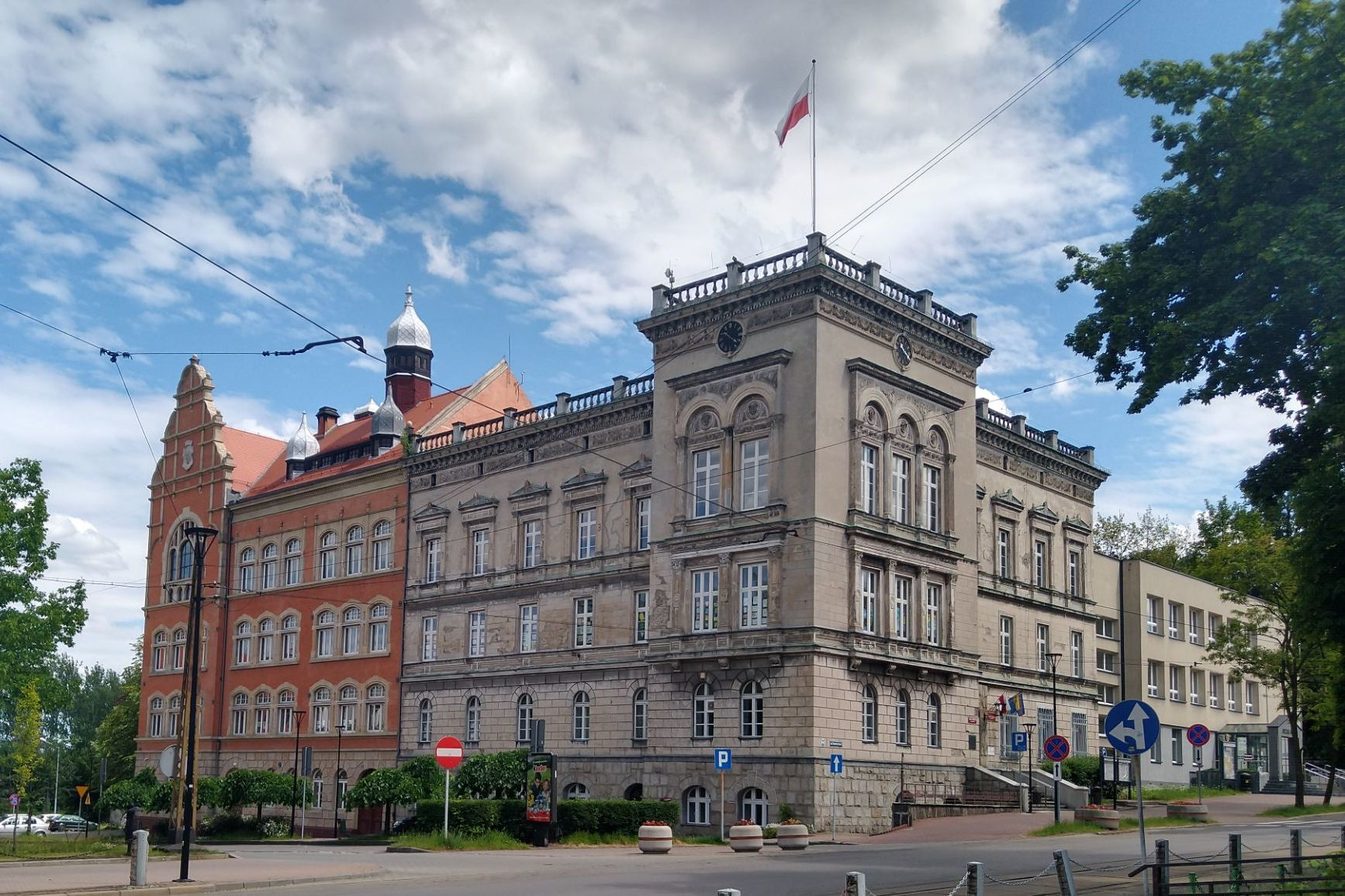
Mysłowice town hall

Mysłowice is one of the oldest cities in Upper Silesia. Located at the confluence of the White and Black Przemsza rivers, it is situated on an important trading route from Wrocław to Kraków. The earliest traces of the modern settlement date back to the 11th and 12th century, when it was part of Piast-ruled Poland. The first mention of a parish priest is found in a document from 1306. In 1360, Mysłowice was already referred to as a town. The previously existing village was granted city rights around 1260.

Over the centuries the ownership of the city changed frequently, as did the borders between different countries. After the foundation of the German Empire in 1871 the area became known as Dreikaisereck ("triangle of the three emperors"), as it was situated at the point where the Austrian, German and Russian Empires adjoined. A local branch of the Polish Sokół movement was established in 1903, but was dissolved in 1905 due to harassment by local German authorities, and replaced by a new branch in the present-day district of Kosztowy a week later. After World War I, in 1918, Poland regained independence, and in 1919, local Polish miners organized large protests in Mysłowice. On August 15, 1919, the German Grenzschutz opened fire on protesting Polish miners and their families. Seven miners, two women and a teenage boy were killed, and many people were wounded. The event, known as the "Mysłowice massacre", sparked the First Silesian Uprising against Germany. In 1921, the Upper Silesia plebiscite was held, in which 56% of the residents of Myslowitz voted to remain in Germany and 44% voted to rejoin Poland, while the overwhelming majority in the present-day districts (then surrounding villages) of Brzezinka, Brzęczkowice, Dziećkowice, Kosztowy, Krasowy and Wesoła opted to reintegrate with Poland, with the result ranging from 77.3% voting for Poland in Brzęczkowice to 96.7% in Wesoła. After the Silesian Uprisings in 1922, Mysłowice and the rest of East Upper Silesia became part of the newly restored Second Polish Republic.

During the German occupation of Poland (World War II), the Germans operated a Nazi prison in the town. Many Polish children passed through the prison during the implementation of the Nazi genocidal policy towards Polish families in Silesia. In the Wesoła district, the Germans also established and operated a forced labour camp for Jews and a subcamp of the Auschwitz concentration camp. In the final stages of the war, most prisoners of the subcamp were evacuated by the Germans in a death march to Gliwice and then deported to Germany, while the remaining sick prisoners were mostly murdered by the SS. A dozen or so prisoners managed to hide and survived the massacre, and were taken care of by Polish miners afterwards.

In 1951, city limits were expanded, and Brzezinka and Brzęczkowice were included as new districts.

== Districts ==
Mysłowice is subdivided into 14 districts:

- Bończyk–Tuwima
- Brzezinka
- Brzęczkowice and Słupna
- Dziećkowice
- Janów Miejski–Ćmok
- Kosztowy
- Krasowy
- Larysz–Hajdowizna
- Morgi
- Mysłowice Centrum
- Piasek
- Stare Miasto (Old Town)
- Szopena–Wielka Skotnica
- Wesoła

== Education ==
Mysłowice is home to a university-level institution called Górnośląska Wyższa Szkoła Pedagogiczna im. Kard. Augusta Hlonda (August Hlond College of Pedagogy) located at ul. Piastów Śląskich 10.

Mysłowice has eight Junior High Schools and five Secondary and vocational schools. There are at least 20 kindergartens located in Mysłowice, residing at location with greater density of children. On top of that, there are also 17 primary schools operating in the city.

== Monuments ==
There are some buildings in Mysłowice which prove the medieval origin of the town. Farna Church, located near the market square, is the oldest and probably the only brick church in Mysłowice. Saint Cross Church is another brick building, maintained in baroque and classicistic style; according to Catholic tradition, it is the oldest place of religious worship in the town. There is also a Jewish cemetery in the town. The origins of the place trace back to the 18th century, when Jews decided to buy a tract in order to create their own graveyard.

== Culture ==
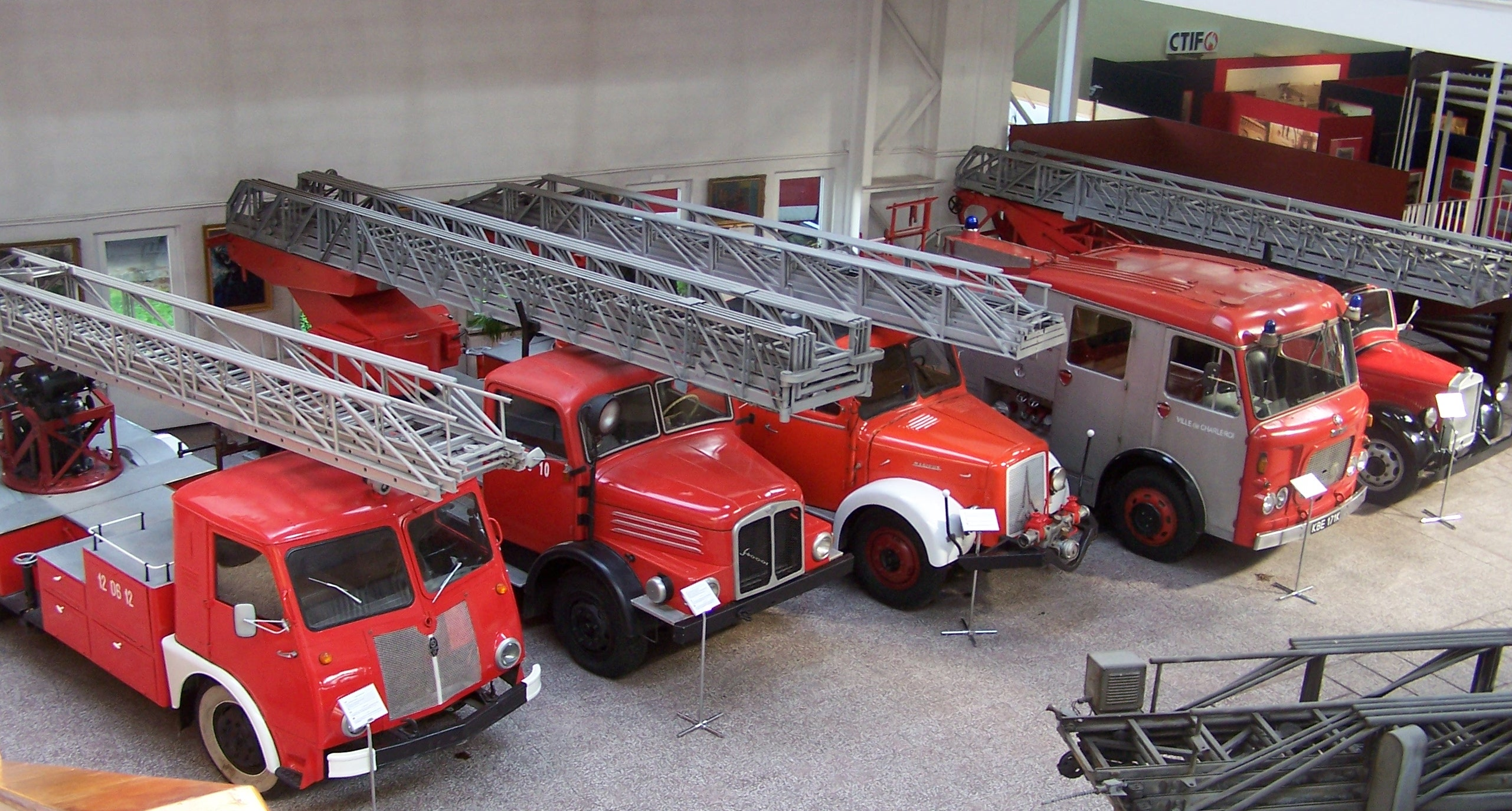
Museum of Firefighting in Mysłowice

The Off Festival is an annual music festival started in 2006 by musician Artur Rojek (however, in 2010 it was moved to Katowice). Bands from Mysłowice include Myslovitz formed 1992 (named after their hometown), as well as Lenny Valentino (1998–2001).

== Economy ==
As of 2017, the city was the location of one of five Amazon logistics centres in Poland, which serves customers across Europe.

== Notable people ==
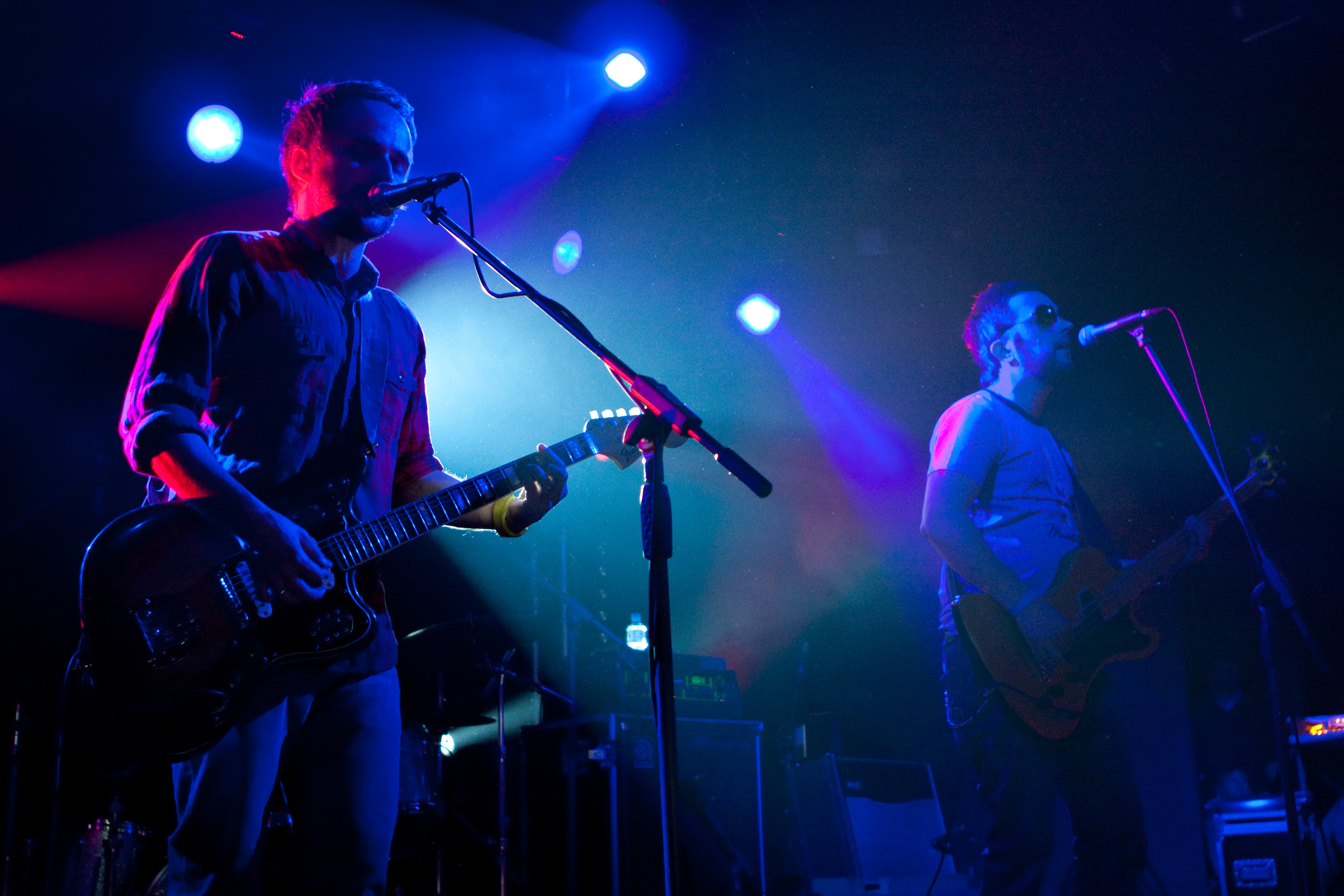
Performance by Myslovitz. The band take their name from their hometown.

- Azriel Zelig Hausdorf (1826–1905), Jewish philanthropist and doctor
- August Hlond (1881–1948), cardinal, Archbishop of Poznań and Gniezno, Primate of Poland
- Georg Koßmala (1896–1945), Wehrmacht general
- Albert Norden (1904–1982), East German politician
- Jerzy Chromik (1931–1987), long-distance runner
- Ireneusz Pacula (born 1966), former ice hockey player and coach
- Mariusz Puzio (born 1966), former ice hockey player
- Jolanta Fraszyńska (born 1968), film and theatre actress
- Artur Rojek (born 1972), musician, former guitarist and lead singer of the Polish alternative rock group Myslovitz
- Piotr Bajtlik (born 1982), actor

== Twin towns – sister cities ==
Mysłowice is twinned with:

- Enz (district), Germany
- Frýdek-Místek, Czech Republic

Former twin towns:

- Sokolinaya Gora (Moscow), Russia

In February 2022, Mysłowice severed its partnership with Moscow's Sokolinaya Gora district as a reaction to the 2022 Russian invasion of Ukraine.
