= Danny Harf =

American wakeboarder

Danny Harf is an American professional wakeboarder and sports video producer.

== Early life ==
Harf was born in Visalia, California and moved to Orlando, Florida where he grew up on Lake Willis and learned to water ski. He found his passion with wakeboarding at age 10. In 2000 he became a professional wakeboarder at age 16.

== Career ==
Erik Ruck met Harf at a wakeboard tournament in 1999 where they became friends and still rides with him.

Harf won the Transworld Wakeboarding Rookie of the Year award in 2000 and is a four-time X Games champion. His film, Defy, is a wakeboarding movie that shows one of the first ever double backflips ever done on a wakeboard.

Shawn Watson, Brian Grubb, Parks Bonifay, Shane Bonifay, Chad Sharpe, Nick Weinacker and Francois Roy came together to make "Pointless Productions", to make a video called Incomplete to show that they were the best wakeboarders of the time.

Harf was the first, and only rider to do a 1260 degree spin behind boat, in 2008.

== Tournament wins and awards ==
- 2000: Rookie of the Year
- 2000: Pro Wakeboard Tour: Oklahoma City – 1st place
- 2001: X Games – 1st place
- 2002: X Games – 1st place
- 2003: X Games – 1st place
- 2003: WWA National Championships – 1st place
- 2003: U.S. Masters – 1st place
- 2004: U.S. Masters – 1st place
- 2004: Pro Wakeboard Tour: Orlando – 1st place
- 2005: X Games – 1st place
- 2005: Pro Wakeboard Tour: Fort Worth – 1st place
- 2005: Pro Wakeboard Tour: Portland – 1st place
- 2005: WWA National Championships – 1st place
- 2006: U.S. Masters – 1st place
- 2006: Pro Wakeboard Tour: Twin Cities – 1st place
- 2006: Pro Wakeboard Tour: Kelowna – 1st place
- 2006: Pro Wakeboard Tour: Reno – 1st place
- 2006: Pro Wakeboard Tour – 1st place
- 2008: First ever to land 1260°
- 2009: Brostock - 1st place
- 2012: Ronix Best Video of the Year

== Sponsors ==
Danny rides with eight sponsors: Nautiques, Ronix, Monster Energy, Fox, Reef, Billabong, Spy Optic, Performance Ski & Surf.

Monster Energy began sponsoring Harf back in 2006. He has been with Spy, an apparel brand, since 2005.

== Defy ==
The film was directed and filmed by Sean Kilgus. December 18, 2011 was the premier for Defy in Orlando at the Beacham Theater. It was sponsored by Transworld Wakeboading, Fox, Nautique boats, TIge boats, and System 2.0.

He rode a Ronix wakeboard throughout the movie. His crew consisted of Jimmy Lariche, Bob Soven, Parks Bonifay, Adam Errington, Rusty Malinosky, and Shaun Murray. They filmed at Radar Lake, Mexico, Australia. They included wake skating about 45 minutes into the video and show a segment of people riding and doing tricks on wake skates.

=== Soundtrack ===
- Overture (Tron) - Daft Punk from trailer
- Kids - Sleigh Bells - from trailer
- Fabrication - Emalkay

== Radar Lake ==
Danny Harf's favorite practice location is Radar Lake.

Radar Lake is located in Woodinville, Washington and is one of the first man-made lakes built specifically for water sports. The land it is built on was initially bought and developed by water sports innovator Herb O'Brien in 1972. O'Brien, drawing from his water sport experiences as a young man, envisioned Radar Lake to be an isolated and private area where enthusiasts could come and enjoy not only the thrill of the sport but also the pristine natural environment. In 1976, the property was bought by Seattle based owner of Seattle Electric, now Radar Inc., Wilbur McPherson who gave it its current name in honor of his company. McPherson and O'Brien maintained a close relationship, and O'Brien bought Radar Lake back from McPherson in 2000. McPherson continued to live on the property, along with O'Brien and their respective families, until he lost his life to cancer in 2007.

Herb O'Brien died in 2012, but his family continues to manage the property as Radar Events, LLC.
