= Hyperlite Wake Mfg. =

- Company type: Private
- Industry: Sports, watersports
- Founded: Redmond, WA (1985)
- Headquarters: Snoqualmie, Washington, United States
- Products: Wakeboards, wakeboard bindings, clothing, wakesurfing
- Website: www.hyperlite.com

Hyperlite Wake Mfg. is a manufacturing company that was established in 1991 in Redmond, Washington. The company manufactures a variety of water sports equipment including wakeboards, wakesurfs, vest, paddleboards and more.

== History ==
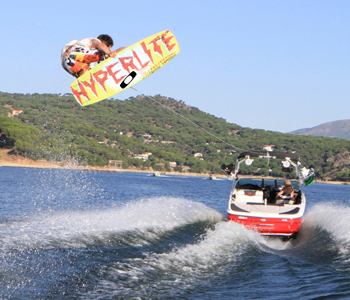
Hyperlite B-Side

In 1991 the first Hyperlite wakeboard was created, the board was manufactured under HO Sports company. H.O. Sports worked with surfboard shapers in Hawaii to design and build the first compression-molded neutral-buoyancy wakeboard, the Hyperlite.

The first wakeboard was a directional 155cm board with a three fin setup and four "phasers" on the bottom of the board. Phasers are circular indents in the bottom of the board which are meant to soften the landing of the board. This innovation sparked the growth of what today is known as wakeboarding although it was referred to as skiboarding or skurfing at the time.

Other board companies such as Neptune and Connelly started manufacturing their own compression molded wakeboards.

In 1992, two early innovators in wakeboarding, Darin Shapiro and Eric Perez, helped to design the Hyperlite Pro. This board consisted of more phasers on the bottom of the board as well as a stronger rocker line.

The first advertisement for Hyperlite was in Wakeboard Magazine in 1994. In 1994, Hyperlite became its own entity separate from HO Sports.

In 1996, Hyperlite released the first twin tip board in wakeboarding. This allowed riders to ride switch more easily and opened the doors for new tricks. This year was also when Shaun Murray joined the Hyperlite team, creating the longest lasting rider-company partnership in the industry.

In 2006 Hyperlite founder Herb O'Brien left H.O. and Hyperlite to form a new watersports company named Square One Co with a new wakeboarding brand, Ronix, that would compete with Hyperlite. O'Brien was one of the founding members of the X Games.

In 2007, Hyperlite launched the Byerly brand of wakeboard and Wakeskate promoting Scott Byerly as his own distinct brand for the first time.

== Team ==
Notable team members have included:

- Rusty Malinoski
- Shaun Murray
- Trever Maur
- Noah Flegel
- JD Webb
- Jayden Webster
- Graeme Burress
- Nicolas Leduc
- Alex Aulbach
- Nick Davies
- Scott Byerly
- JB Oneill
- Cody Hesse
- Bec Gange
- Rocker Steiner
- Lewy Watt
- Raimi Rutledge
- Brady Patry
- Cobe France
- Elliot Digney
- Tina Fromling
- Josh Twelker
- Bene Tremmel
- Lisa Baloo
- Kane Ward
- Pedro Caldas

== 2020 Wakeboard Line (Boat) ==
=== Riot ===
The Riot is the flagship board for Hyperlite. The first year that the shape was released was in 2018. The board has one of the thinnest and lightest profile. The Riot comes with two different core options. The first option is the biolite 3 core, this is the lower price point of the two and the same core that is in the rest of the lineup. The second option is the Nova core, this is a higher price point core unique to the Riot, it makes the board stronger and lighter than other boards in the lineup. The rocker line on the board is an abrupt continuous rocker. This gives the board more boost off of the wake while keeping the speed that so many riders look for. The board is Noah Flegel's pro model.

=== Blueprint ===
The Blueprint is the pro model for team rider Trever Maur. The board comes in two sizes, a 143 and a 147cm. The rocker line on the board is continuous, giving it a lot of speed to carry through the wake. Similar to the Riot, the Blueprint has a dual concave base which allows for water to quickly pass under the board. The spine down the middle of the board allows for softer landings as the water is easily displaced. The Blueprint comes with 4 .7" Blueprint fins.

=== Source ===
The Source is the pro model for team rider JD Webb. The board comes in two sizes, a 139 and a 143cm. The board has a blended 3 stage rocker which provides the most pop out of the rocker line. The board comes with the biolite core which reduces swing weight. The board comes with 4 .8" P-Wing fins.

=== Rusty Pro ===
The Rusty Pro is the pro model for team rider Rusty Malinoski . This board comes in 3 different sizes, a 140cm, a 143cm, and a 146cm. The board comes with an abrupt continuous which helps to generate speed through the wake. The board has a large channel down the center which helps it to track better in the water. The tip to tail channel helps water flow quickly under the board increasing speed. The board comes with four beam fins.

=== Relapse ===
The Relapse has a blended 3 stage rocker which adds pop to the board. It comes with four molded in fins along with two removable .8" P-Wing fins. The board comes with the biolite core which reduces swing weight. It also has a single concave from tip to tail.

=== Murray Pro ===
The Murray Pro is the pro model for team rider Shaun Murray. This board has a subtle three stage rocker which gives it more pop off of the wake. It has the biolite 3 core which makes it light and durable. The Murray Pro has a relatively flat base with one spine in the center. The spine displaces water on landings making the board softer. There is a rolled edge in between the feet, reducing the likelihood of catching an edge. The board comes fitted with four .8" P-Wing fins. The board comes in a 134, 139, 144, and 150cm.

== Notable Partners ==
Notable "partners" have included:

- Nautique
- Sea Ray
- Fox Racing

== #IRide ==
#IRide is a social media platform of Hyperlite's website. This allows the user to create a profile providing a picture of themselves, hometown, favorite wakeboarder, favorite lake, and age. The #IRide campaign produced stickers as well. It was pushed during Seattle's Seafair festival where team riders will put on a show for a large audience.
