= Stawiki =

- Bagry
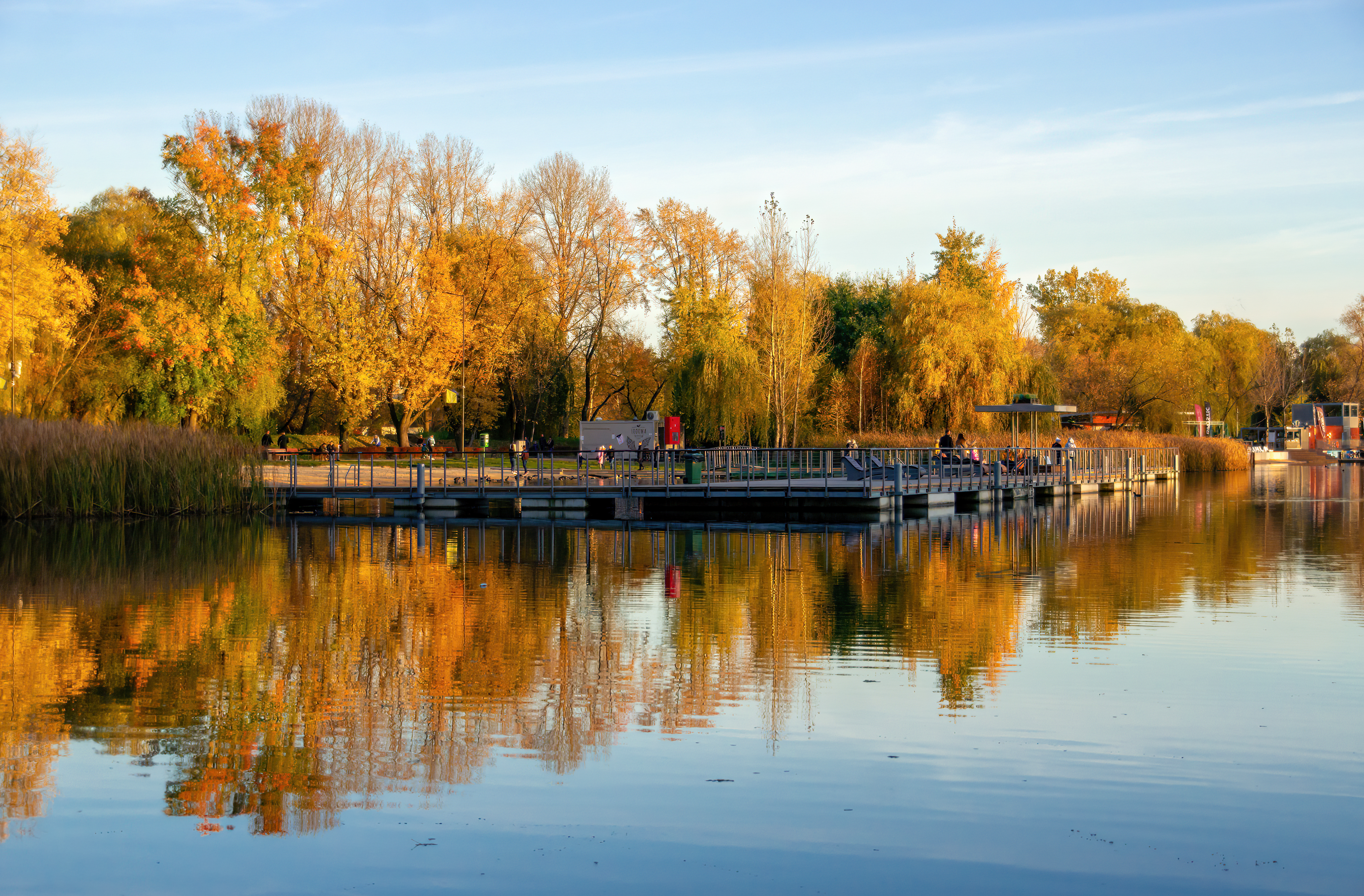
- Stawiki bathing area

- Location within Silesian Voivodeship Stawiki (Poland)
- Location: Stary Sosnowiec / Zarzecze, Sosnowiec, Silesian Voivodeship, Poland
- Coordinates: 50°16′25.504″N 19°6′34.553″E
- Type: Artificial lake
- Basin countries: Poland
- Surface area: 7.8 ha (19 acres)
- Max. depth: approx. 5 m (16 ft)
- Water volume: 120,000 m^{3} (4,200,000 cu ft)
- Shore length^{1}: 1,200 m (3,900 ft)
- Surface elevation: 248 m (814 ft)
- Settlements: Sosnowiec
- ^{1} Shore length is not a well-defined measure.

Stawiki is a water reservoir and recreation complex of the same name in Sosnowiec, southern Poland, located on the edge of Lieutenant Pilot Jan Fusiński Park (formerly Leon Kruczkowski Park) in the western part of the city near the border with Katowice. The pond is situated on land which, before 1960, belonged to the then town of Szopienice; following an administrative decision changing the boundary of Szopienice, the area was incorporated into Sosnowiec.

== Water body ==
Like the other water bodies making up the Szopienice–Borki landscape complex in the Brynica valley, the Stawiki pond was created in a former sand-extraction pit.

The water surface covers 7.8 ha, with a volume of around 120,000 m³. The average depth is approximately 3 m, with a maximum depth of about 5 m.

In 2008 water-quality tests classified the reservoir in class I with an overall rating of “good”. Subsequent tests in 2016 rated the quality of the water as “excellent”. As an officially designated bathing area, the waters of the reservoir are under constant supervision of the State County Sanitary Inspectorate in Sosnowiec.

== Infrastructure ==
Stawiki is a popular leisure area located less than 2 km from the centre of Sosnowiec and around 9 km from the city centre of Katowice. For this reason it has a well-developed recreational and sports infrastructure.

The reservoir is the base for a recreation and leisure centre operated by the municipal sports and recreation organisation MOSiR Sosnowiec. It is also fishing ground no. 304 and lies directly on the route of the Bicycle Trail of the Former Borderland (Szlak Rowerowy Dawnego Pogranicza).

=== Stawiki bathing area ===
The Stawiki bathing area consists of a sandy and grassy municipal beach about 100 m long, guarded in the summer season and equipped with changing rooms and toilets; it is managed by MOSiR Sosnowiec. The designated guarded swimming zone has dimensions of approximately 100 m by 60 m.

=== Wake Zone Stawiki ===
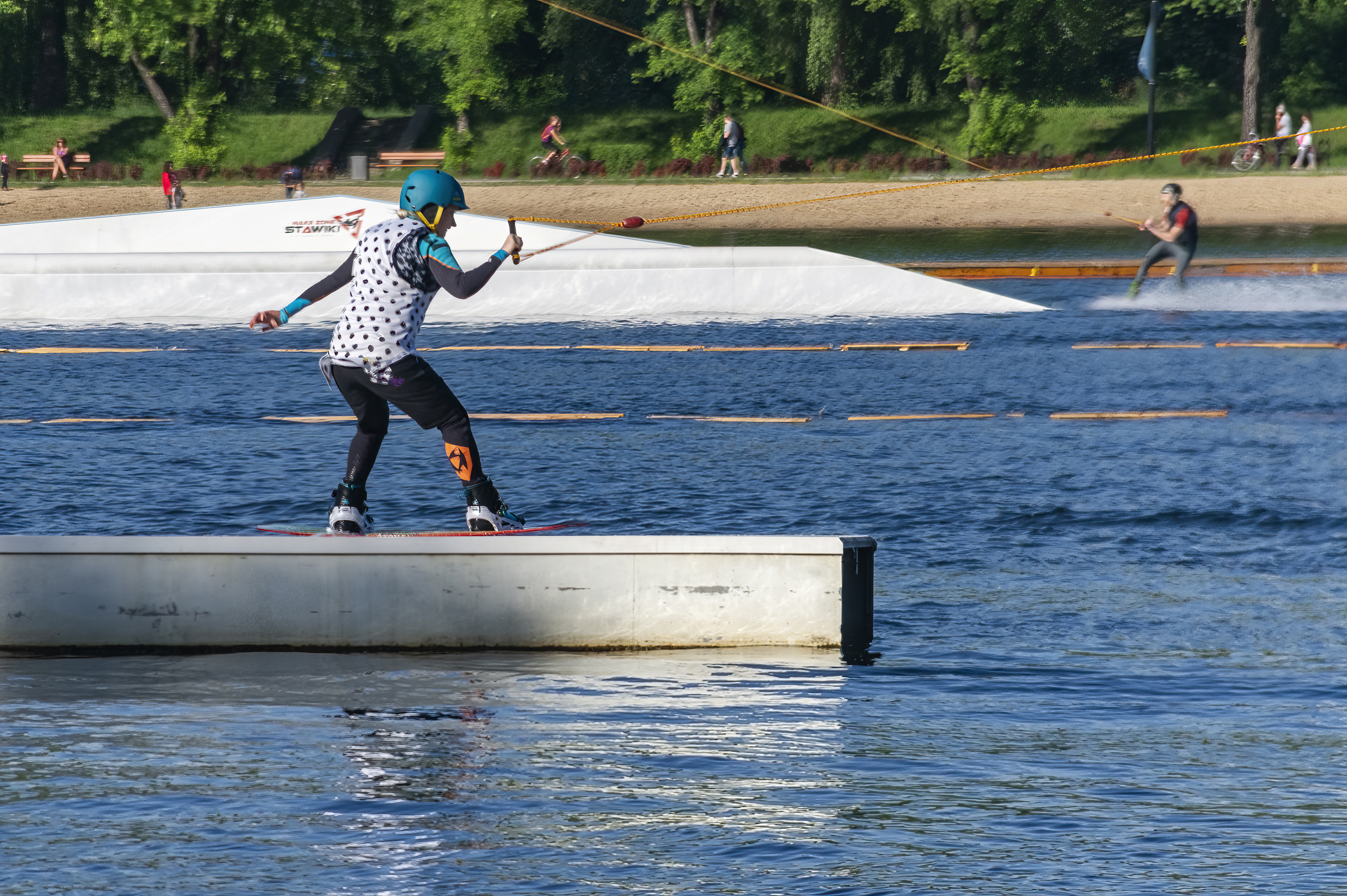
Wakeboarding at the Wake Zone Stawiki cable park on Stawiki pond

Wake Zone Stawiki is a sports and recreation complex on the northern shore of the Stawiki reservoir, centred on cable systems for wakeboarding, wakeskating and cable water skiing. The wakepark began operating in 2013 with a two-tower (2.0) cable on the pond next to the Ludowy Stadium in Sosnowiec and was expanded in 2017 with a full-size, five-tower Rixen 5.0 system, together with new on-site infrastructure including a beach, catering facilities, changing rooms, showers and a wakeboard shop.

The complex is equipped with a full-size counter-clockwise Rixen 5.0 cable of about 750 m in length and around 10–11 m cable height, with up to ten riders on the line at the same time, and a separate two-tower Sesitec system used mainly for training and beginner lessons. On the water there is a large set of obstacles including kickers in several sizes, rooftop funboxes, pipes and rails designed for both recreational riding and advanced tricks. Shore facilities comprise a sandy beach, beach bar, equipment rental, locker and shower area and children’s zone; commercial operators and specialist schools describe Wake Zone Stawiki as one of the largest and best-equipped wakeboard centres in Poland.

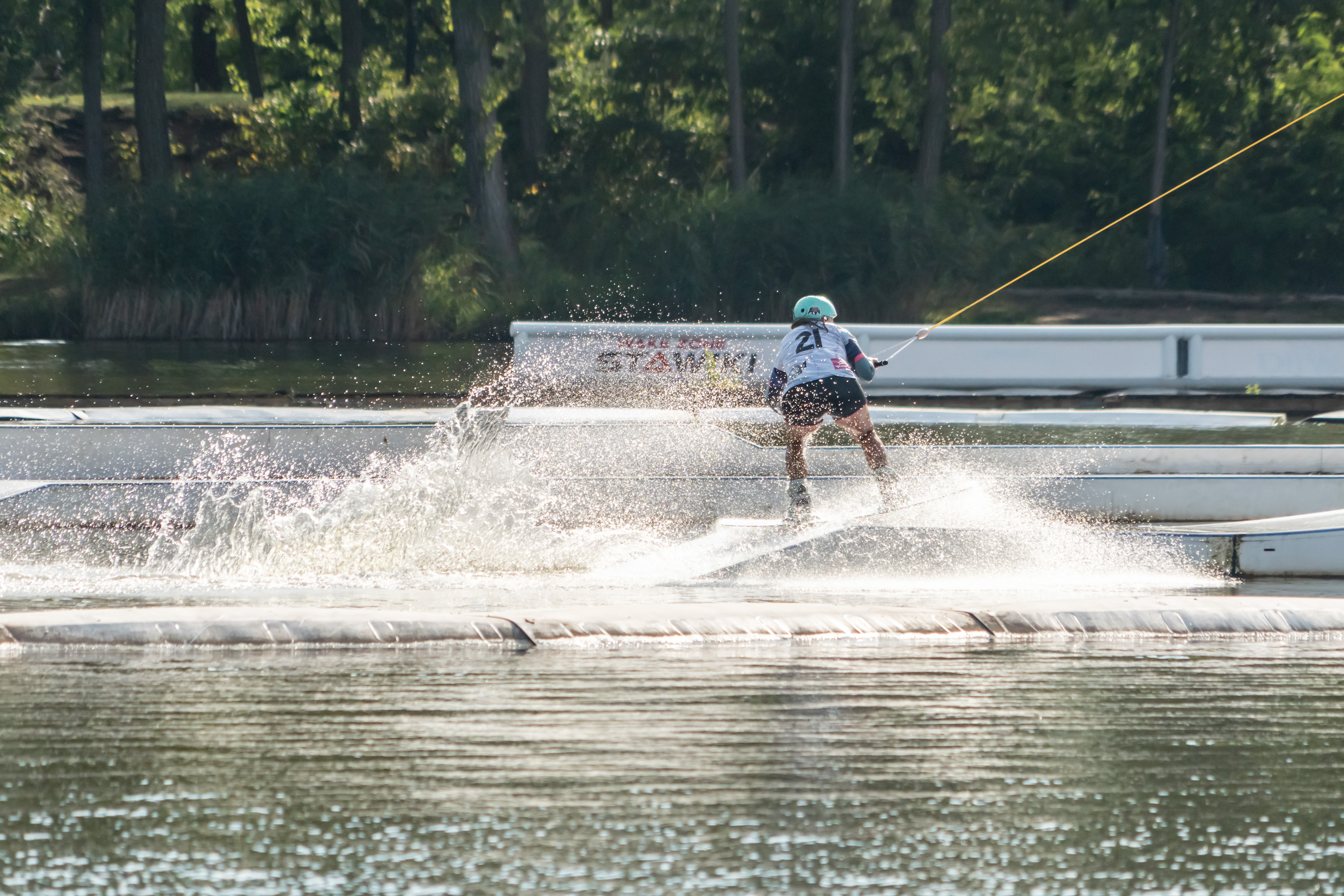
Polish Wakeboard and Wakeskat Championships, Wake Zone Stawiki, August 2024

The complex operates a non-profit sports club, KS Wake Zone Stawiki, affiliated to the Polish Motorboat and Water Ski Association (PZMWiNW). The club runs youth and adult training in cable wakeboard, wakeskate and cableski and cooperates with the national team; Stawiki serves as one of the main training bases for Polish cable-towed water-sports athletes.

Thanks to this infrastructure the Stawiki reservoir has become a regular venue for national and international competitions. In July 2019 Wake Zone Stawiki hosted the European and African Cable Wakeboard, Wakeskate and Sitwake Championships, with press reports noting medals for the Polish team and describing the Sosnowiec course as one of the key European venues for the discipline. In September 2021 the pond was the site of the 2021 IWWF Cableski World Championships (Open category) sanctioned by the International Waterski & Wakeboard Federation (IWWF), held from 10 to 12 September on a world-record-homologated cableski course. The same site regularly hosts Polish national cableski championships and other ranking events.

In 2024 the venue again staged major IWWF events in cableski. The 2024 IWWF World Cableski Championships took place at Wake Zone Stawiki on 13–15 September 2024, followed in the same month by the European Junior and Senior Cableski Championships, all organised by PZMWiNW and KS Wake Zone Stawiki on the Stawiki reservoir. According to the Polish federation, world-title events in Sosnowiec in 2021 and 2024 were accompanied by strong performances from Polish athletes and helped to consolidate the reputation of the Stawiki cable course among international riders.

In addition to cableski events, Wake Zone Stawiki is also a regular host of international wakeboard and wakeskate competitions. From 18 to 23 August 2025 the complex staged the European and African Youth and Senior Cable Wakeboard and Wakeskate Championships, with almost 200 competitors from 22 countries and four medals for the Polish team in youth and masters categories. Federation and media coverage emphasise that, due to the repeated organisation of world and continental championships in both cableski and cable wakeboard, the Stawiki reservoir and Wake Zone Stawiki are considered among the principal European venues for international competition in cable-towed water sports.

=== Educational trail ===
An educational trail of 732 m in length with eight stations runs around the northern part of the reservoir and through adjacent woodland. Each station is devoted to a different topic, such as a clearing, peat bog, overturned tree or the orchid species Epipactis helleborine. Information boards describe the local vegetation and include simple tasks or questions for visitors. The total area covered by the trail is more than 50,000 m². On the route there is also a demonstration apiary and small infrastructure such as benches, a fire pit and a tourist shelter.

The trail is located in and around the Stawiki woodland between the football complex and the bathing area. It leads through forest, peat bog and meadow areas.

=== Additional attractions ===
- An outdoor gym with eight exercise stations;
- A 1.8 km cycling loop with a bituminous surface, separated from the pedestrian route by a strip of greenery planted with white dogwood shrubs;
- A children’s playground;
- A 200-metre running track for sprint training;
- Seasonal food outlets and pubs and the year-round restaurant Siedlisko Stawiki. In 2018 the restaurant was extended with a grill section, ice cream shop and inflatable attractions for children (bouncy castle and slide);
- A station of the Metropolitan Bicycle public bike-sharing system (previously the Sosnowiec Municipal Bicycle scheme until 2023);
- Small architectural elements: bicycle bays, around 70 benches around the reservoir and 40 bicycle stands;
- A pump track in the form of an asphalt loop 150 m in length;
- A ropes course with two routes (junior and standard).

== Gallery ==
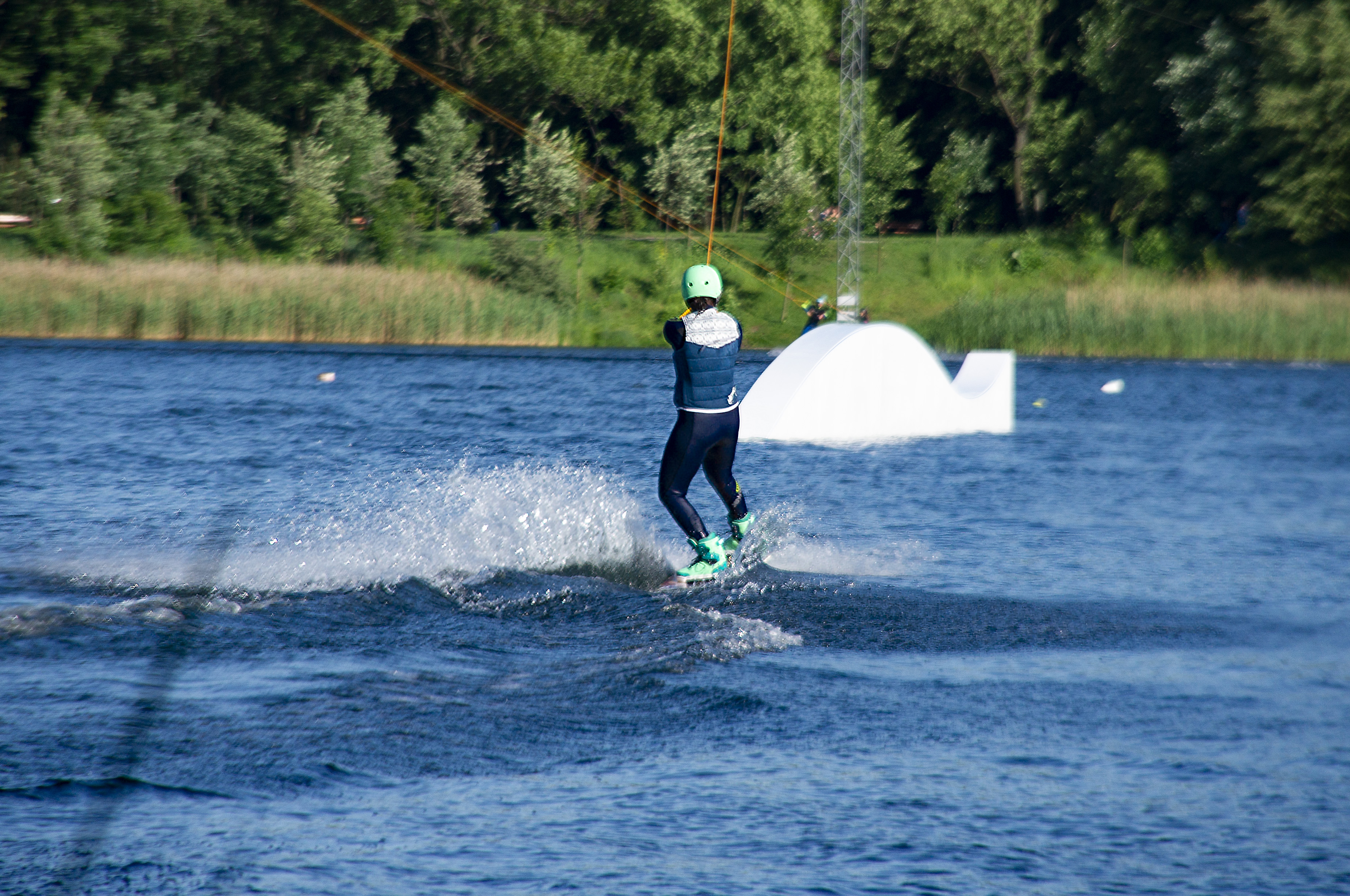
Wakeboarding on the five-tower cable;

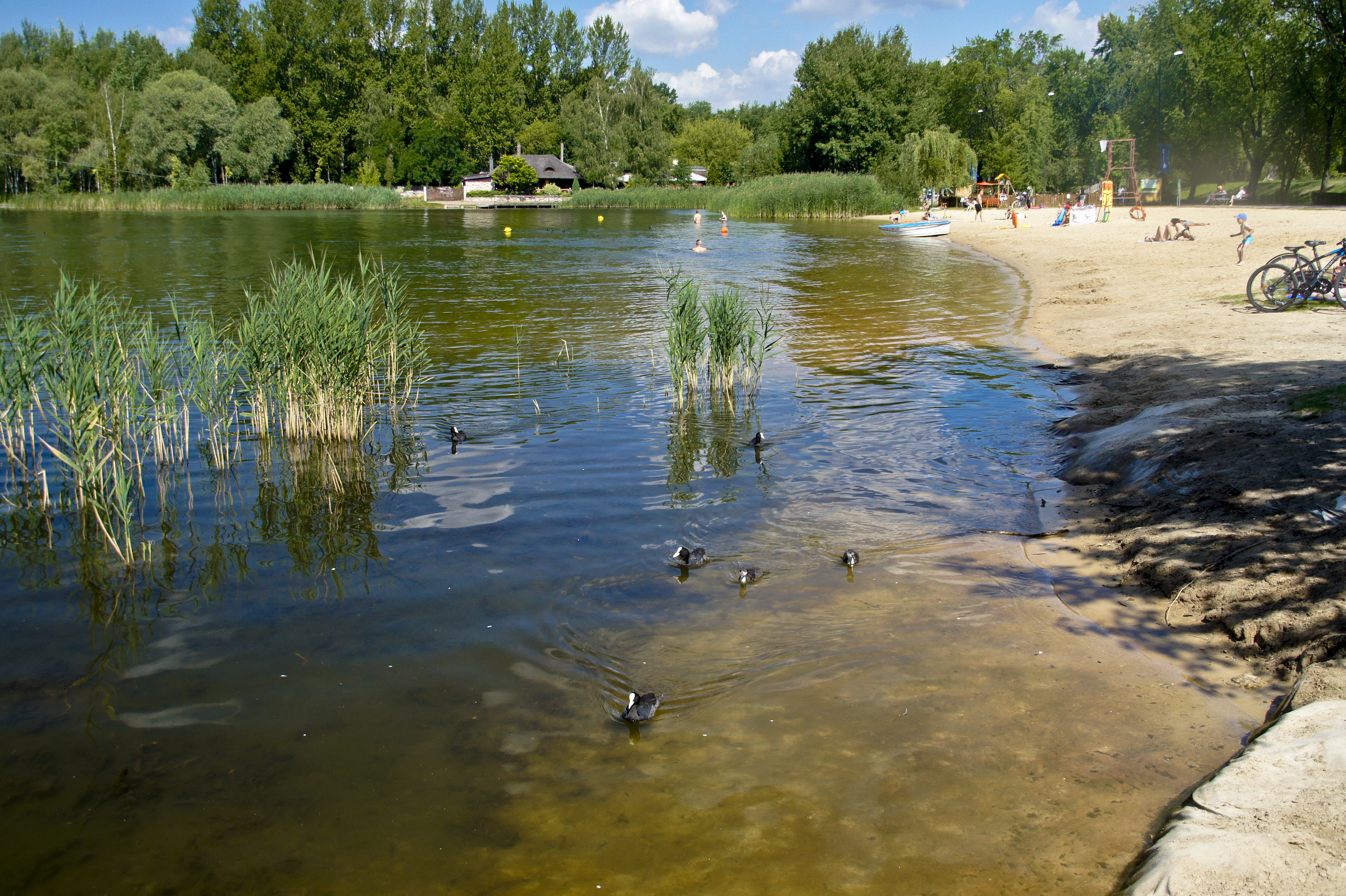
Stawiki bathing area

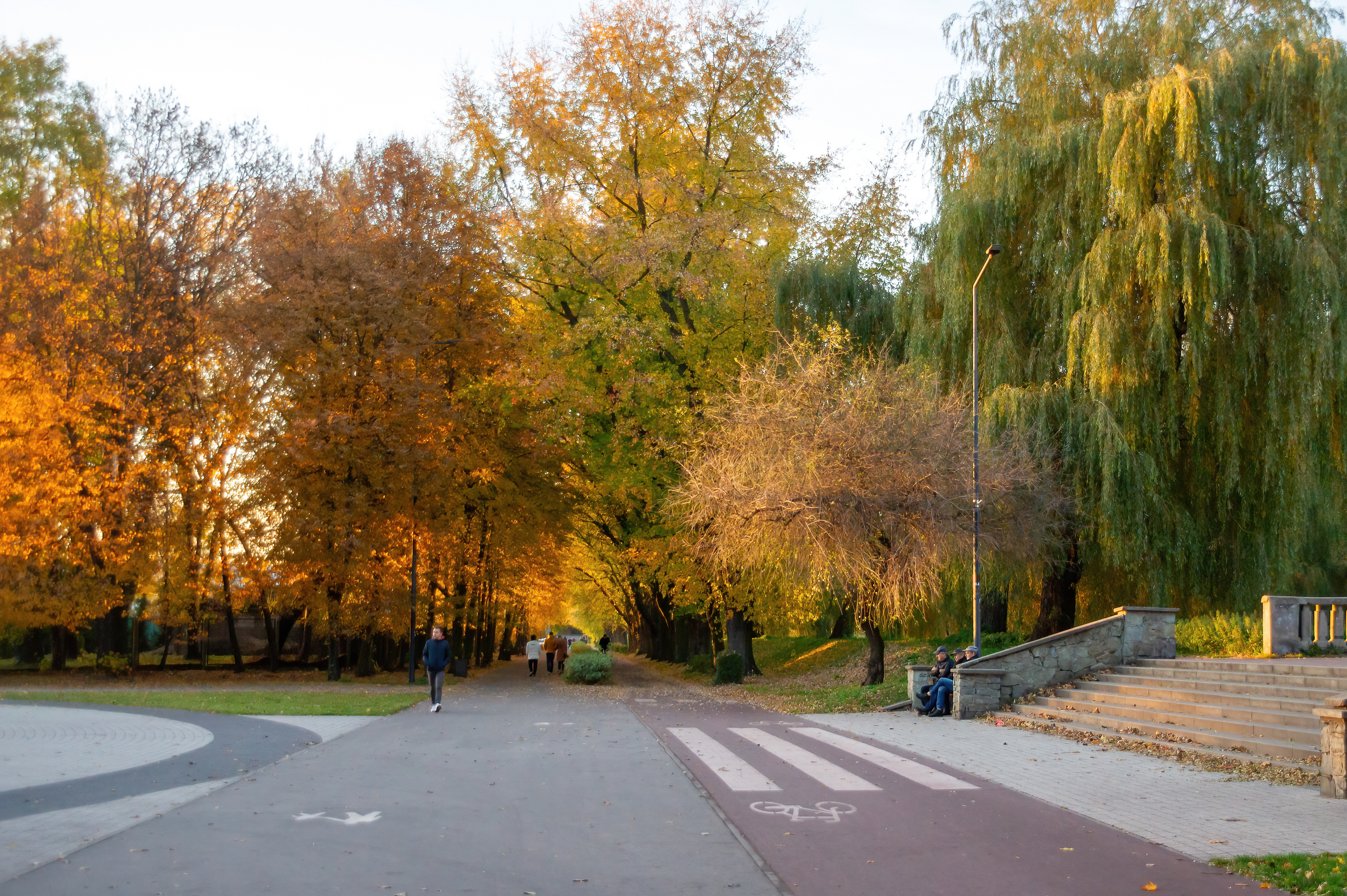
Square in front of the stadium and cycle path

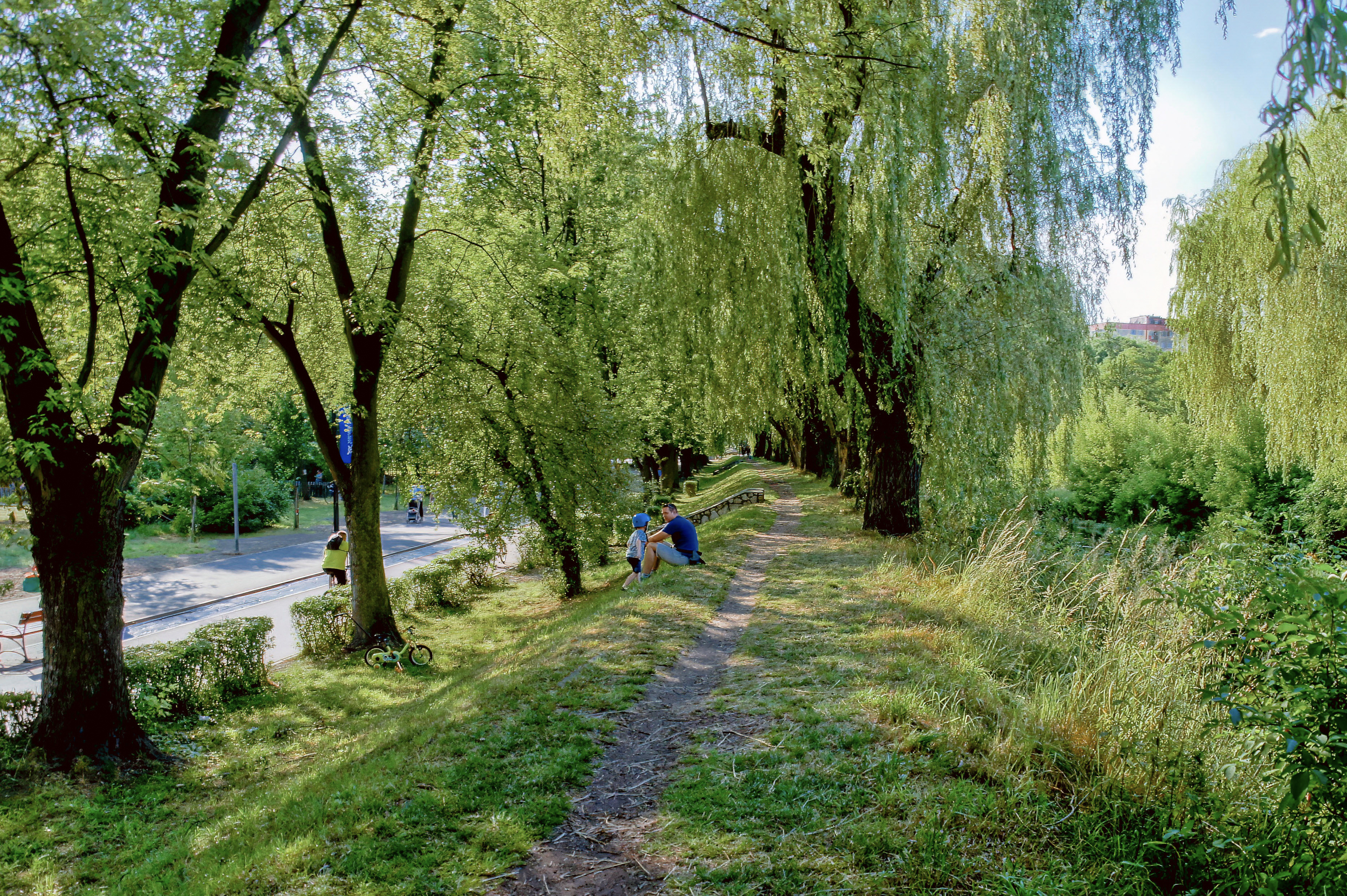
Former Border cycle route on the flood bank

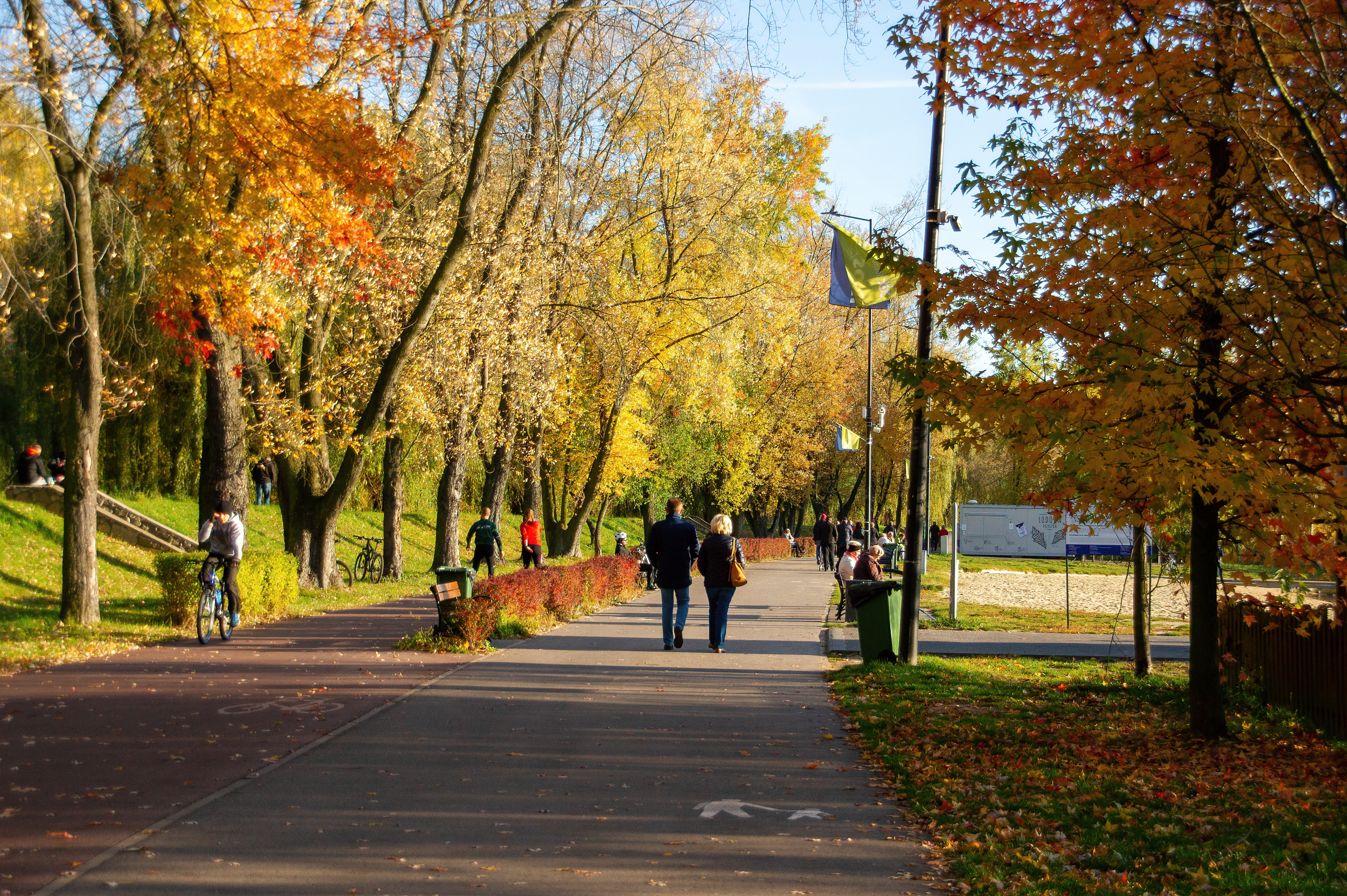
Stawiki in autumn

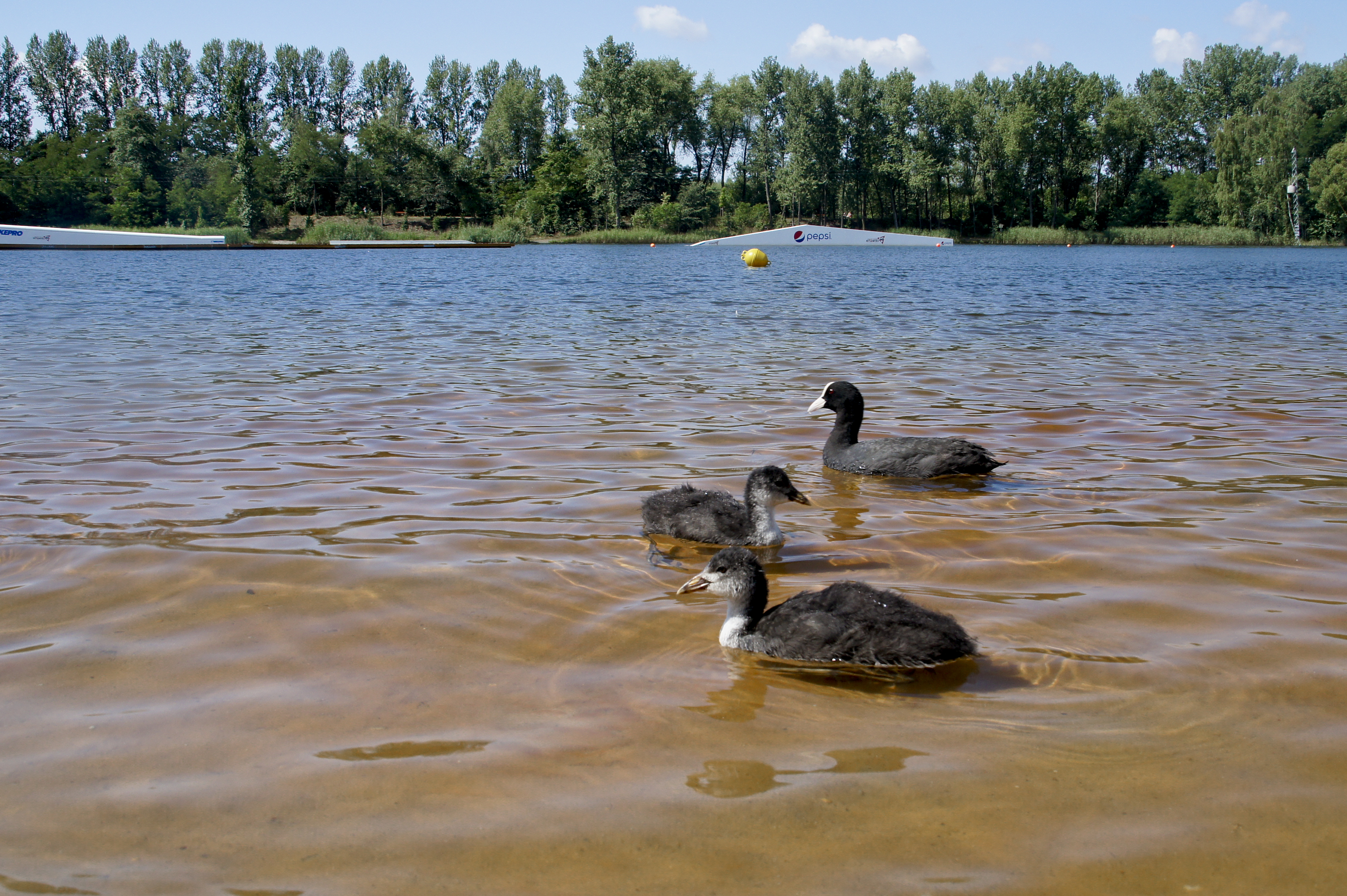
Coots on the pond

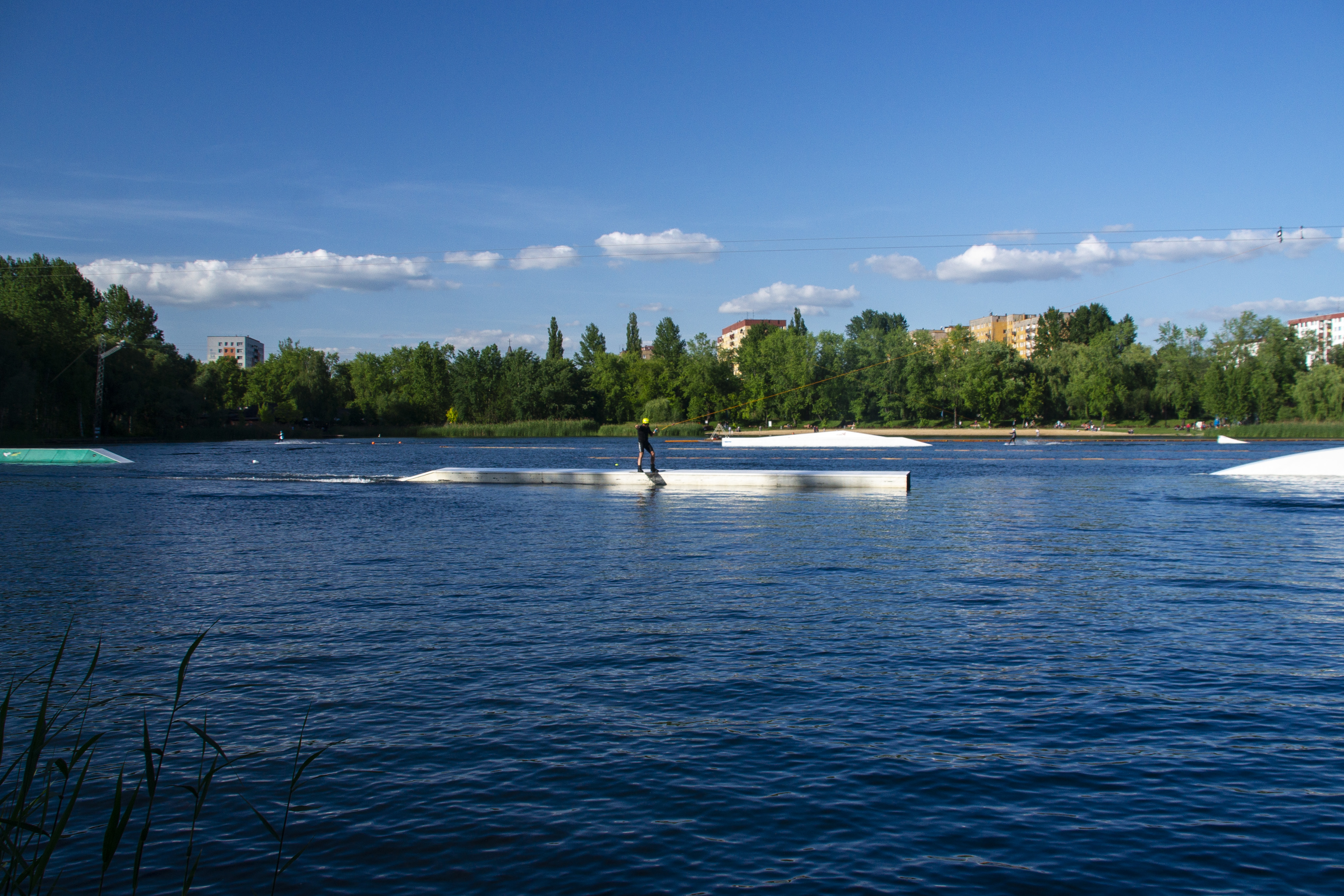
Floating obstacles at Wake Zone Stawiki

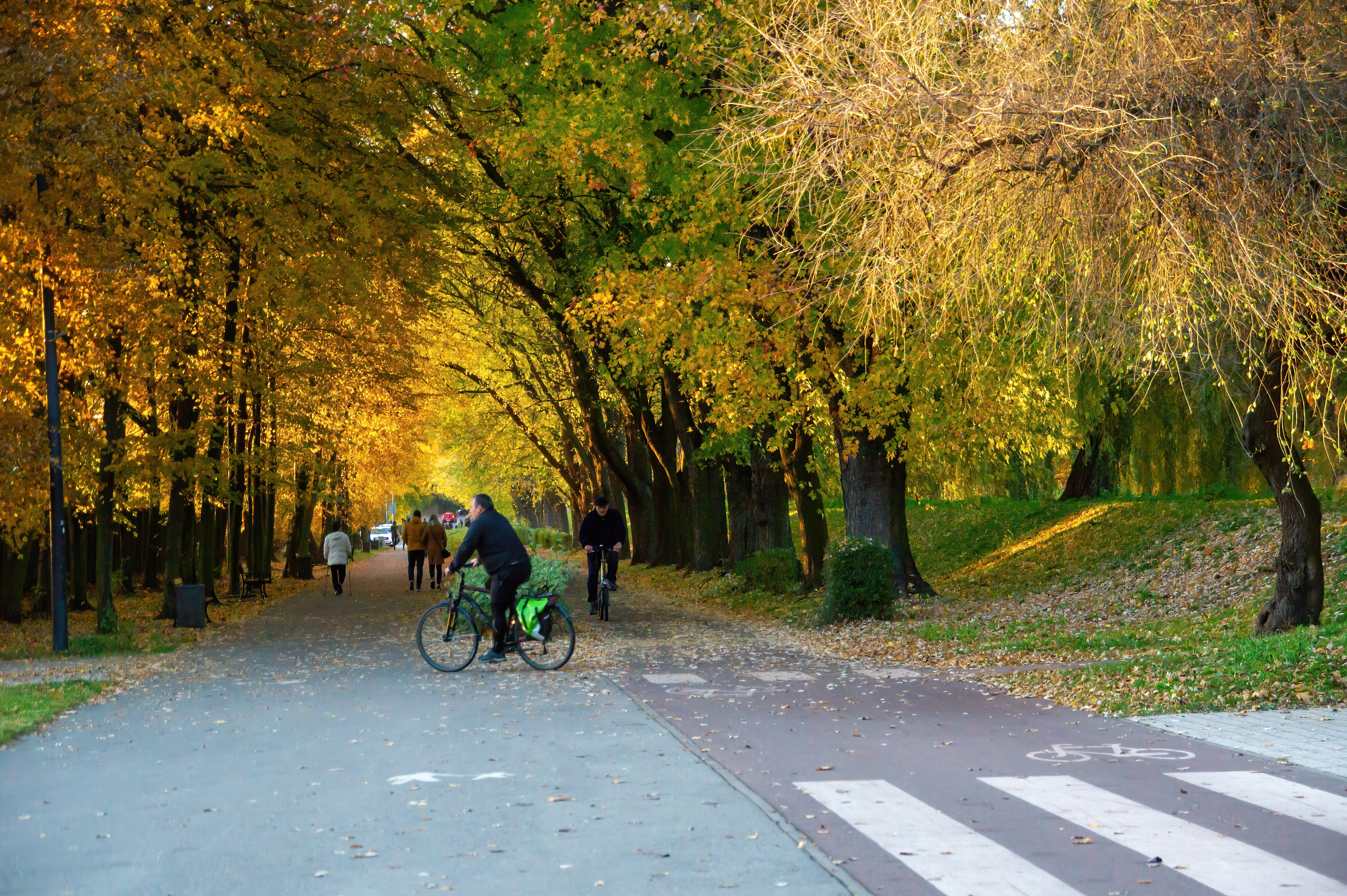
View of the reservoir

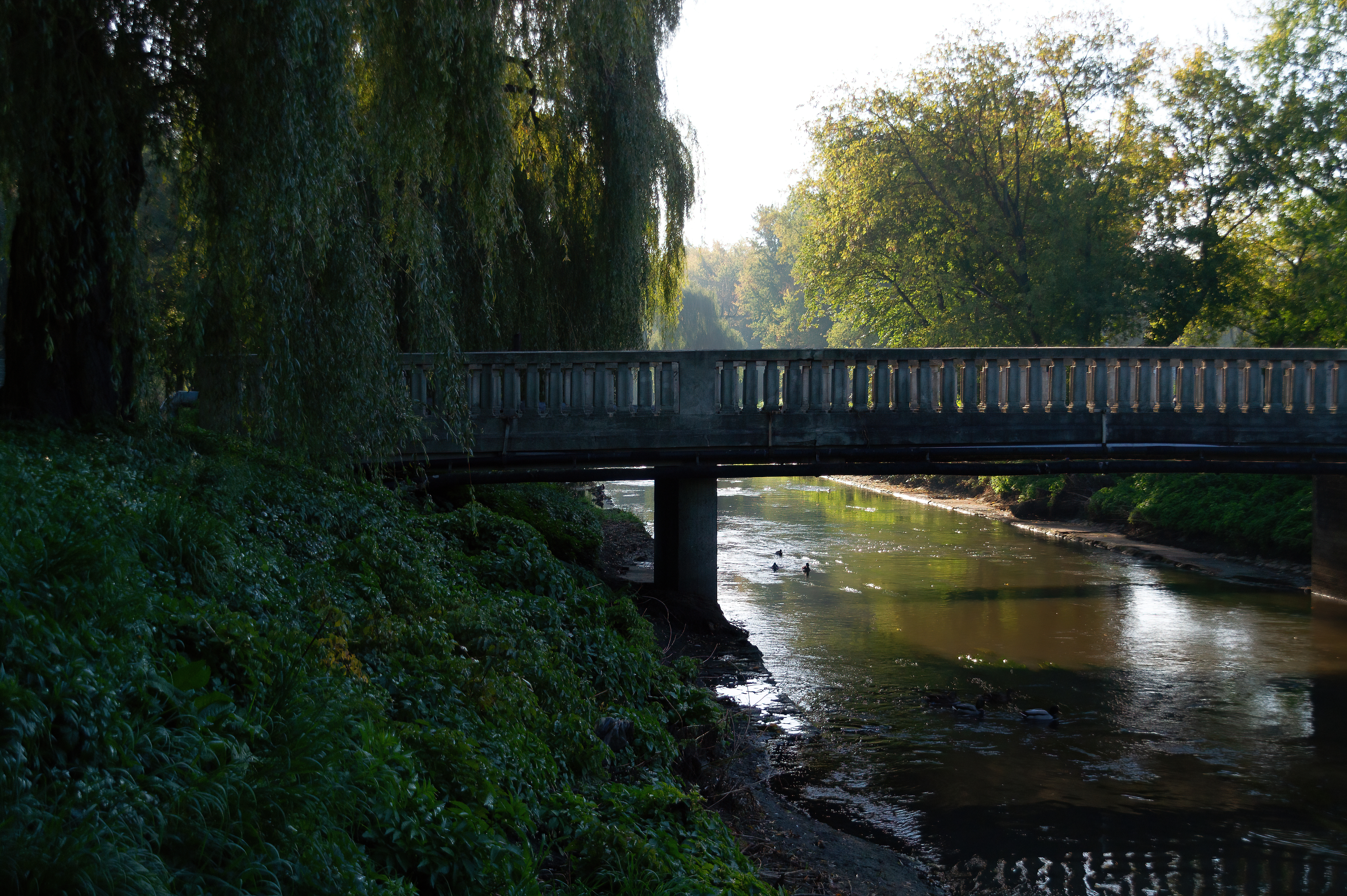
Bridge over the Brynica – access to Stawiki

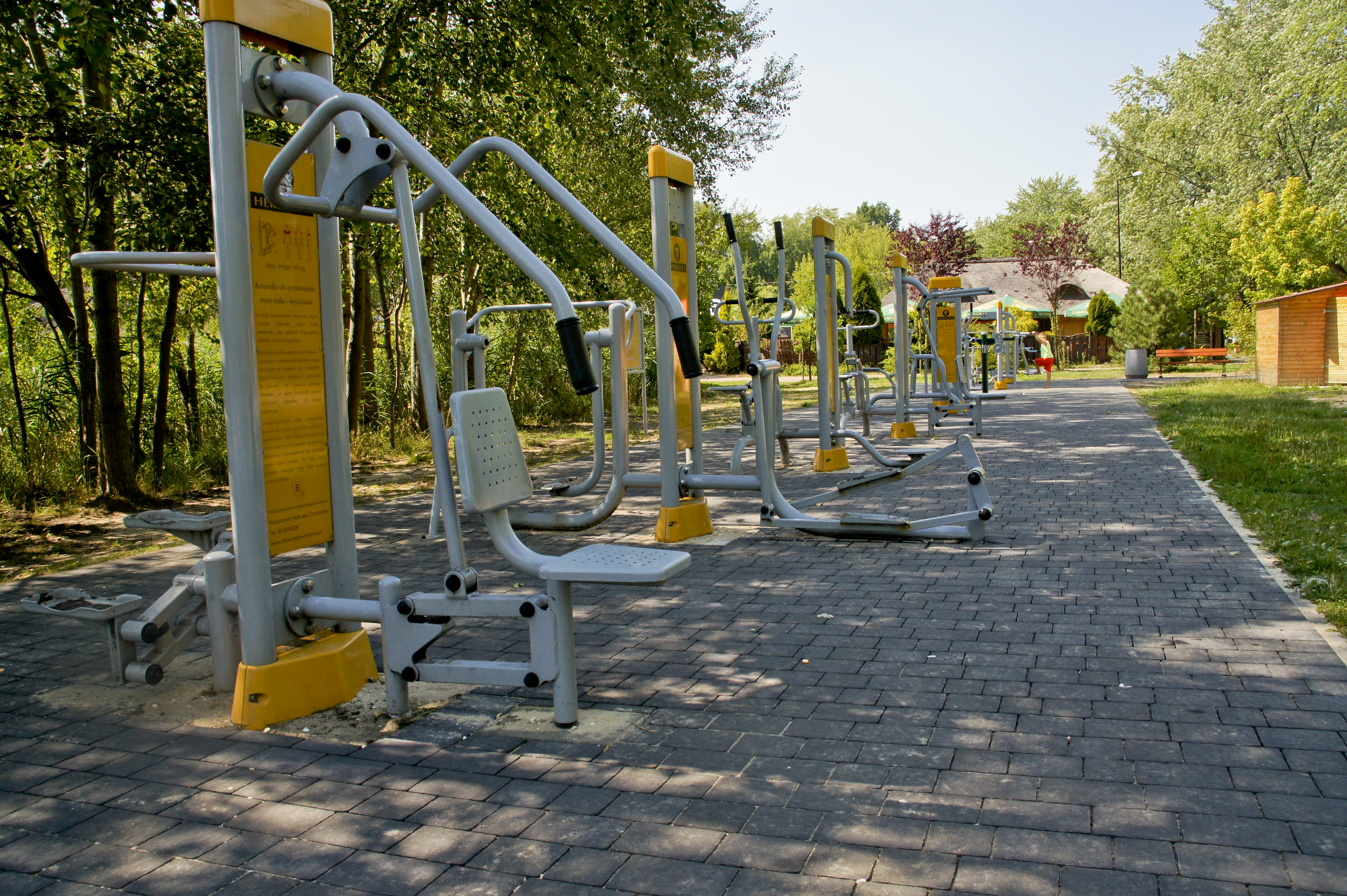
Outdoor gym
