= Rawa (river) =

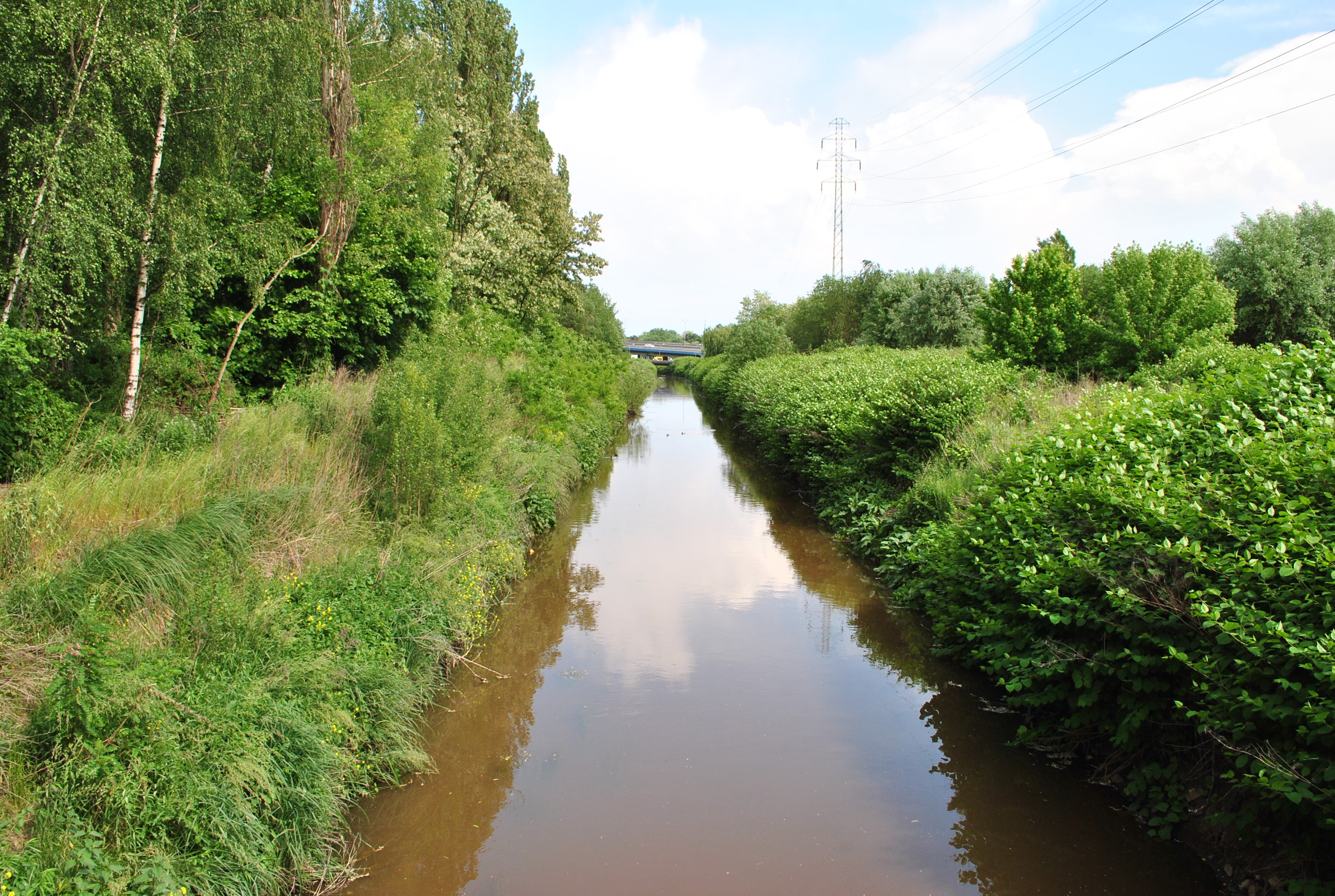
- Rawa flowing through Katowice

Location
- Country: Poland

Physical characteristics
- Source
  - location: Ruda Śląska
- Mouth
  - location: Brynica, Sosnowiec
  - coordinates: 50°15′51″N 19°07′45″E
- Length: 19.6 km (12.2 mi)
- Basin size: 89.8 km^{2} (34.7 sq mi)

Basin features
- Progression: Brynica→ Przemsza→ Vistula→ Baltic Sea

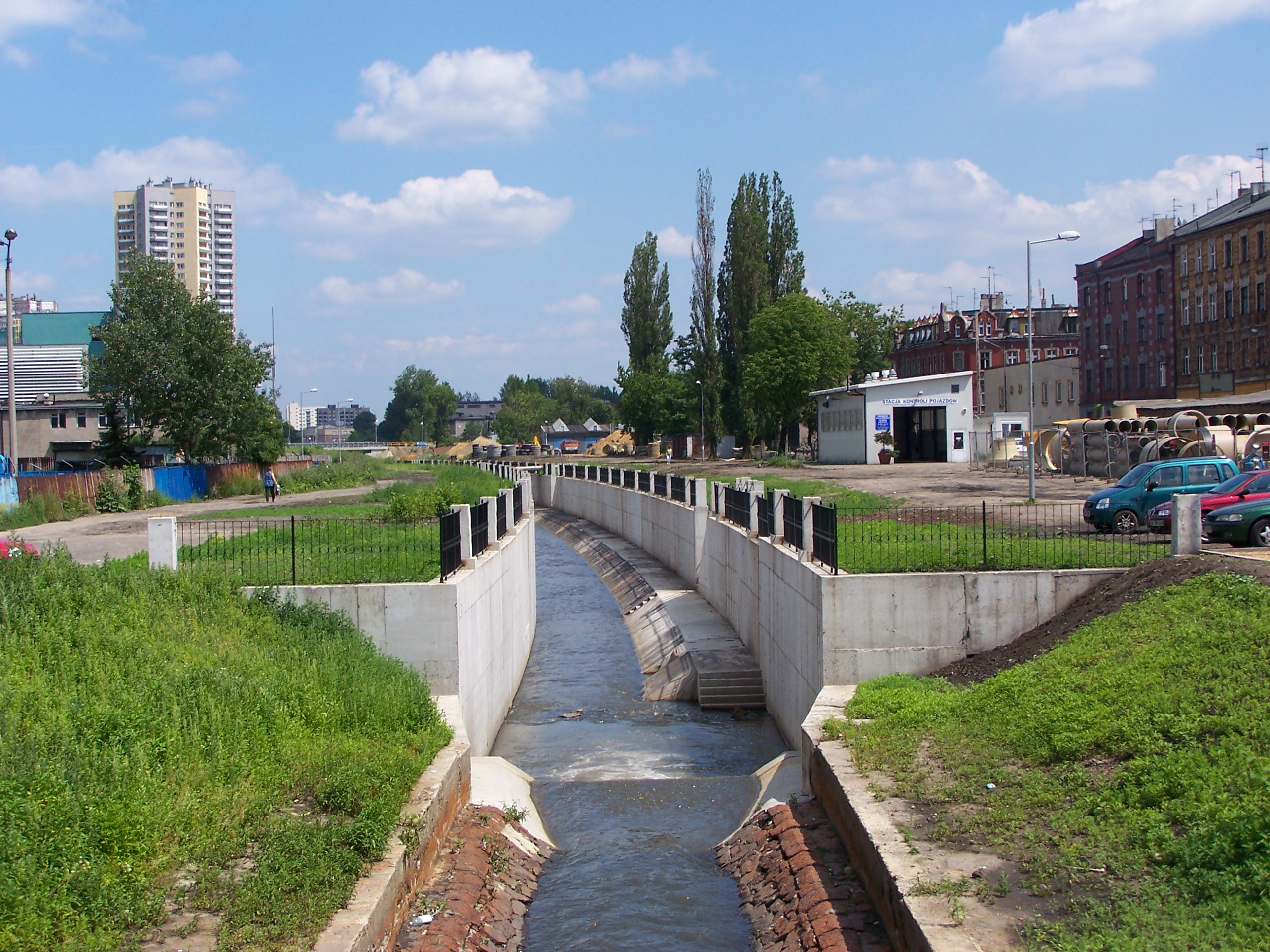
Rawa open canal in Katowice

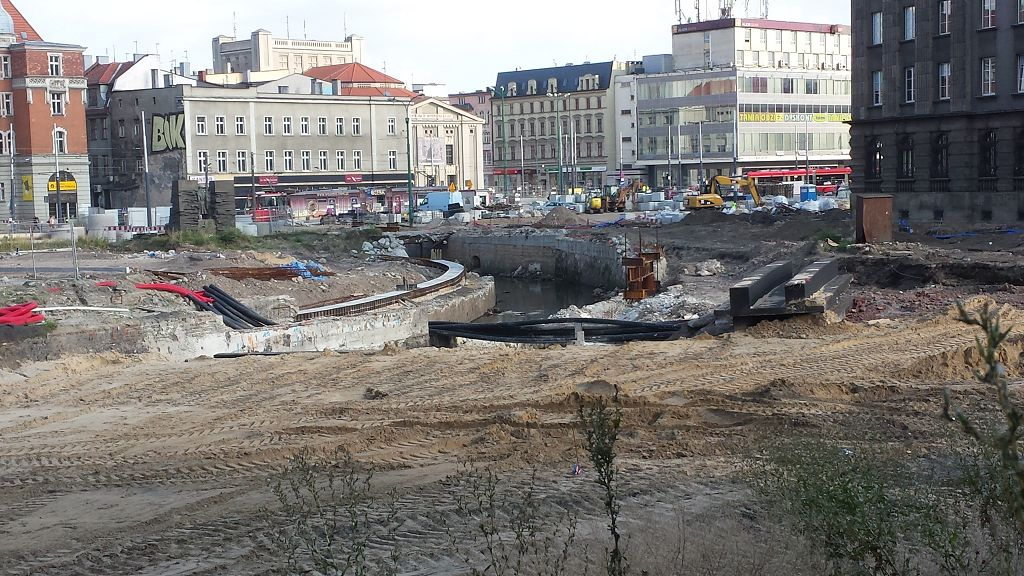
Rawa across Katowice market square during reconstruction

The Rawa (pronounced: Polish: ['rava]; older name Roździanka) is a minor river (about 19.6 km (12.2 mi) long) in Silesia, Poland. It is the largest right tributary of the Brynica, itself a tributary of the Przemsza, which in turn is a tributary of the Vistula. The entire length of the Rawa is within the Metropolis GZM. It has its source in Ruda Śląska and crosses the cities of Świętochłowice, Chorzów and Katowice. Finally in Sosnowiec it joins the Brynica River only several hundred metres before the latter joins with the Czarna Przemsza.

The Rawa has lost most of its natural river character, and is now mostly a sewage channel flowing underground. Works have begun to restore it to an ecologically sound water flow.

== Characteristics ==
The river has a source in the Marcin pond in Ruda Śląska. It flows through Świętochłowice, Chorzów, Katowice, Mysłowice and finally Sosnowiec where it joins Brynica just before the latter joins with Czarna Przemsza.

During much of its route it flows underground, beneath the city's infrastructure. It is filled by rain, as well as sewage. It has several small confluences, such as Potok Leśny (near University of Economics in Katowice).

== Pollution ==
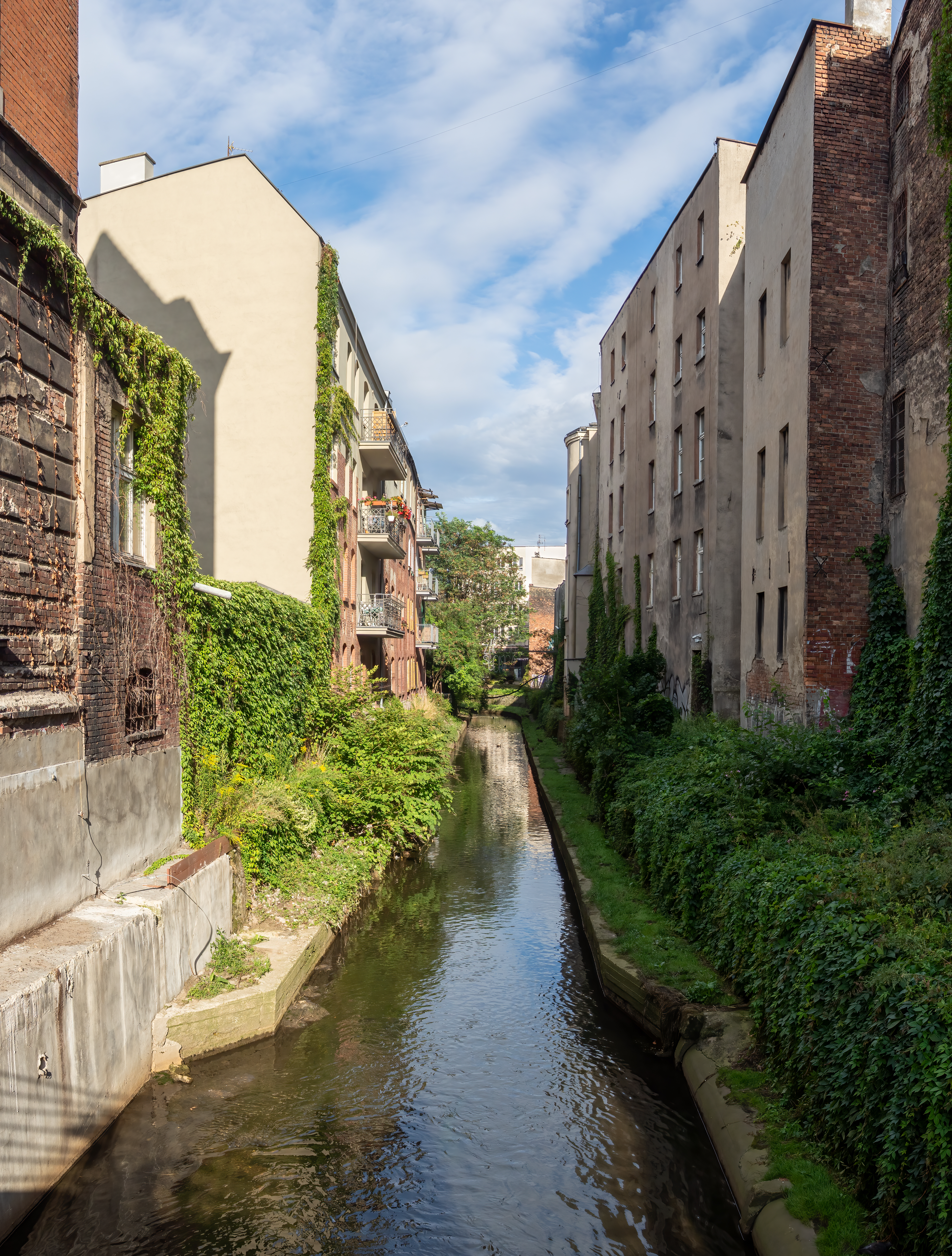
The Rawa passing between residential buildings

The river is notorious for being heavily polluted. Reported to be crystal clear in 1875, the industrialization of Silesia caused the river to become so polluted that all the fish died out by 1893. The continued growth of industry and cities throughout the 20th century, combined with little effort towards preserving the environment, continued to degrade the quality of the water in the river. In 1992, the river, leaving Katowice, was claimed to contain only 14% water, and a popular joke among the local citizens was to warn each other 'not to throw a lit match into the river'. Currently the upper part of the river is officially classified as sewage and the plan is to direct the entire river flow through a treatment plant. In the 1990s plans to improve water quality and restore the ecology of the river were begun. So far new sewage treatment plants have been completed, and the plan is supposed to significantly improve the river's quality by 2010.

== Regulation of flow ==
The primary reason for the regulation of the Rava's flow was the need to prevent flooding as mining continued to lower the level of local lands. The first plans for controlling the flow date to 1863. Plans to regulate the entire length of the Rawa were ready in 1903. The start of the First World War interrupted Prussian government implementation. After the war, the German plans were continued by the government of the Second Polish Republic in the late 1920s, with the construction of a sewage treatment plant (no longer existing). The work was completed in 1938, but the correct flow conditions did not last because of the continued lowering of the land. The second regulation of the river was conducted between 1975 and 1993.

== Name ==
Sources first mention the river in 1737, as Róździanka - from an old village of Roździeń, now part of Katowice's district of Szopienice. The etymology of the name "Rawa" (Rava) is ancient. The name is related to Protoindoeuropean: *er[e](w)-, *rē(w)- (meaning quiet); Germanic: *rḗw-ō, *rṓw-ō, *rōw-a- (Old English: rōw, -e `quiet, rest'; Middle Dutch: rouwe, rowe; Middle Low German: rouwe, rōwe; rāwe; Old High German: ruowa (AD 800), rāwa (9th century); Middle High German: ruowe, ruo, rāwe, rouwe, German Ruhe).
