= Szarlejka (creek) =

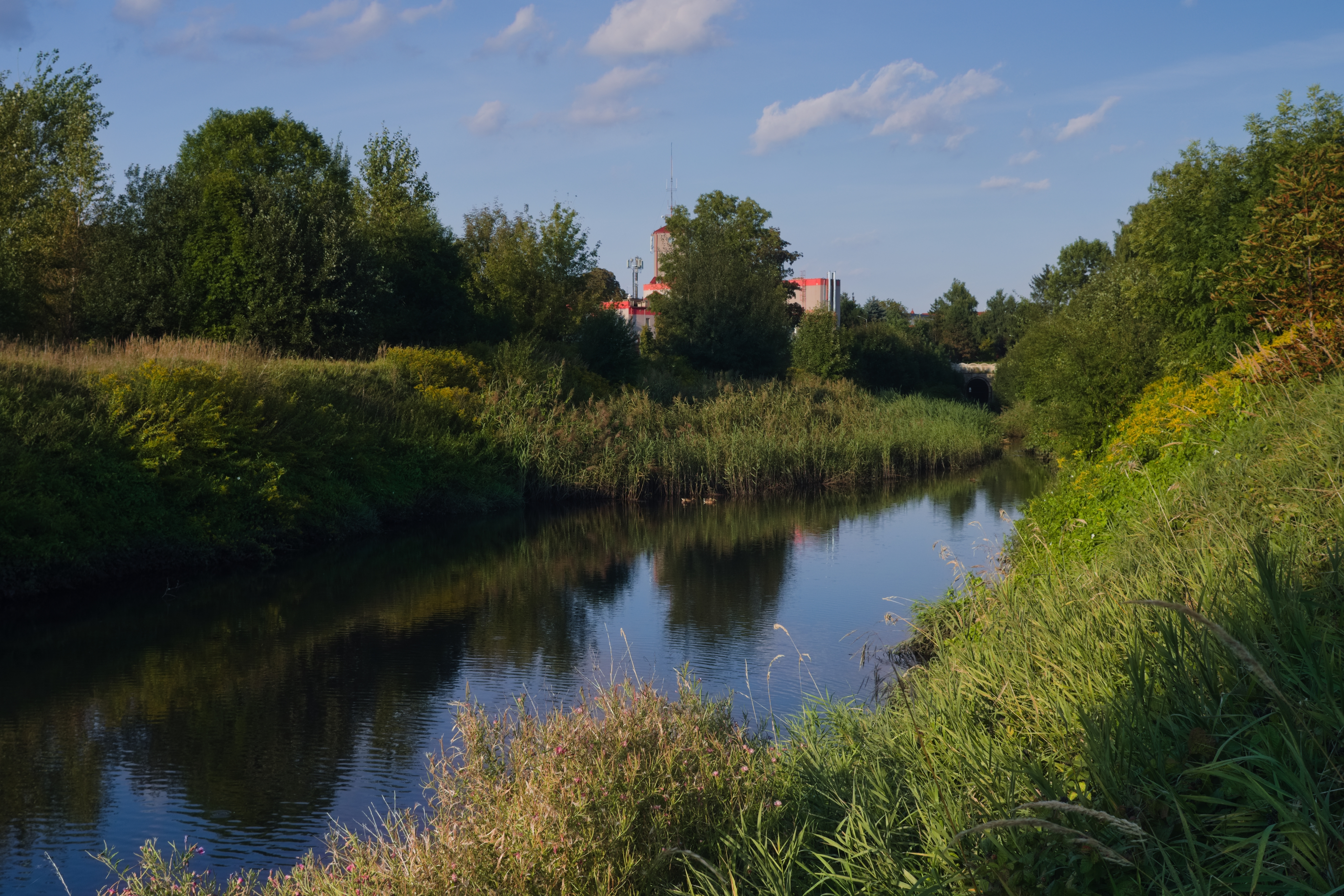
- Szarlejka in Piekary Śląskie (2021)

Location
- Country: Poland
- State: Silesian Voivodeship

Physical characteristics
- Mouth: Brynica
  - coordinates: 50°22′34″N 18°57′33″E
  - elevation: 269 m AMSL

Basin features
- Cities: Bytom, Radzionków, Piekary Śląskie

Szarlejka is a creek in Silesian Voivodeship in Poland. It is a right tributary of Brynica. Its length is 11,9 km (approximately 7 mi). It flows through Bytom, Radzionków and Piekary Śląskie, where it flows in a tunnel for approximately 600 meters (0.37 mi).
