= Water skiing at the 2009 World Games – Women's wakeboard =

Water skiing - Women's wakeboard at the 2009 World Games
- Venue: Lotus Lake, Kaohsiung, Taiwan
- Dates: 22–25 July 2009
- Competitors: 10 from 9 nations

Medalists
gold medal	(United States) Dallas Friday
silver medal	(United States) Raimi Merritt
bronze medal	(Japan) Miku Asai

The women's wakeboard freestyle competition in water skiing at the 2009 World Games took place from 22 to 25 July at the Lotus Pond in Kaohsiung, Taiwan.

== Competition format ==
A total of 10 athletes entered the competition. In preliminary two best athletes qualifies to the final. Athletes who can't qualify through this stage takes last chance qualifiers, from which the best two athletes qualifies to the final.

== Results ==
=== Preliminary ===
Heat 1

Rank	Name	Country	Result	Notes
1	Raimi Merritt	United States	78.60	Q
2	Chen Lili	China	69.00	Q
3	Estelle Tuaz-Torchon	France	48.00	
4	Elke Venken	Belgium	44.70	
5	Iaroslava Liapina	Ukraine	29.70	

Heat 2

Rank	Name	Country	Result	Notes
1	Dallas Friday	United States	77.00	Q
2	Miku Asai	Japan	52.10	Q
3	Ginevra Gentile	Italy	50.60	
4	Sasha Christian	Singapore	38.50	
5	Caitlin Blaauw	Australia	38.10	

=== Last Chance Qualifiers ===
Rank	Name	Country	Result	Notes
1	Ginevra Gentile	Italy	79.80	Q
2	Elke Venken	Belgium	62.60	Q
3	Caitlin Blaauw	Australia	50.60	
4	Estelle Tuaz-Torchon	France	26.00	
5	Sasha Christian	Singapore	24.90	
6	Iaroslava Liapina	Ukraine	22.80	

=== Final ===
Rank	Name	Country	Result
1st place, gold medalist(s)	Dallas Friday	United States	76.80
2nd place, silver medalist(s)	Raimi Merritt	United States	76.10
3rd place, bronze medalist(s)	Miku Asai	Japan	57.00
4	Elke Venken	Belgium	51.10
5	Ginevra Gentile	Italy	48.30
6	Chen Lili	China	32.80
