= Water skiing at the 2015 Pan American Games – Men's wakeboard =

Men's wakeboard at the 2015 Pan American Games
- Venue: Ontario Place West Channel
- Dates: July 21 – July 22
- Competitors: 8 from 8 nations

Medalists
| Gold medal | Rusty Malinoski | Canada |
| Silver medal | Daniel Powers | United States |
| Bronze medal | Juan Mendez | Venezuela |

The men's wakeboard competition of the Water skiing events at the 2015 Pan American Games in Toronto were held from July 21 to July 22 at the Ontario Place West Channel. The defending champion was Andrew Adkison of the United States.

== Results ==
=== Semifinal ===
| Rank | Name | Country | Round 1 | Round 2 | Preliminary Round | Notes |
|---|---|---|---|---|---|---|
| 1 | Rusty Malinoski | Canada | 82.90 | 79.02 | 79.02 | Q |
| 2 | Daniel Powers | United States | 74.88 | 72.88 | 72.88 | Q |
| 3 | Alejo De Palma | Argentina | 41.67 | 52.34 | 52.34 | Q |
| 4 | Juan Mendez | Venezuela | 38.77 | 48.45 | 48.45 | Q |
| 5 | Luciano Rondi | Brazil | 30.66 | 41.55 | 41.55 | Q |
| 6 | Jamie Bazan | Ecuador | 35.55 | 39.22 | 39.22 | Q |
| 7 | Juan Velez | Colombia | 49.77 | 36.24 | 36.24 | Q |
| 8 | Jorge Perez | Mexico | 62.01 | 33.65 | 33.65 | Q |

=== Final ===
| Rank | Name | Country | Result | Notes |
|---|---|---|---|---|
| 1st place, gold medalist(s) | Rusty Malinoski | Canada | 89.11 | |
| 2nd place, silver medalist(s) | Daniel Powers | United States | 80.44 | |
| 3rd place, bronze medalist(s) | Juan Mendez | Venezuela | 72.22 | |
| 4 | Juan Velez | Colombia | 63.79 | |
| 5 | Luciano Rondi | Brazil | 62.21 | |
| 6 | Jorge Perez | Mexico | 58.77 | |
| 7 | Alejo De Palma | Argentina | 52.01 | |
| 8 | Jamie Bazan | Ecuador | 48.56 | |
