= Raimi Merritt =

American wakeboarder (born 1993)

- Born: April 13, 1993 (age 32)
- Occupation: Wakeboarder

Raimi Merritt is a professional wakeboarder and is one of the top female athletes in the sport of wakeboarding.

== Early life and education ==
Raimi Merritt was born on April 12, 1993, in Lantana, Florida. She is the daughter of Gina Merritt, and Steve Merritt, who is a former world champion barefoot water skier. Raimi is the youngest daughter of three other siblings. Growing up she attended kindergarten in a regular school, but that is the only year she attended in a regular school. After that, she was homes-schooled through her senior year of high school. Being home schooled allowed her to travel the world with her family. It also helped advance her wakeboarding career by having the chance to wakeboard every day and participating in many tournaments around the world that she otherwise would not have been able to go to. Since she graduated high school, she is currently taking college courses to obtain a business degree.

== Wakeboarding career ==
Raimi Merritt first fell in love with wakeboarding when she was nine years old and started participating in amateur tournaments by the time she was 11 years old. She won her first-ever tournament that she entered in. When she started winning most of the amateur tournaments she participated in, she realized how great she was in the sport. In 2007, and by the age of only 15 years old, she had turned pro. When she turned pro, she moved to Orlando, Florida, to live with her older sister, Mia to continue training with her coach, Glen Fletcher, who is a former pro wakebaorder.

In 2008, only one year after Raimi turned pro, she was named Queen of Wake's "Rookie of the Year", and won her first world championship title in that year. After that she was named female rider of the year from 2009 to 2013. Since then, she has gone on to win 10 world championship titles, with her last one being in Linyi, China, in 2014 at the Water Ski and Wakeboard Federation's Wakeboard World Cup. She surprised everyone with this win, after being out for most of the 2014 season due to injury, she was cleared shortly before the tournament and ended up winning even in rough conditions. She has now won more world cup titles than any other female in wakeboarding history.

She first gained real popularity in the sport because she was the first female rider ever to land an "s-bend" (wakeboarding trick which is a raley with a 360 -degree overhead rotation) behind a boat. Others had landed it in a cable park, but it is much more difficult to do behind a boat because of the lower angle of the rope. Since then, she has gone on to land many other tricks that other females have not been able to in the past. Her daredevil instincts have also landed her many injuries, but that hasn't stopped her. She has suffered injuries such as torn biceps, a dislocated kneecap, and two broken ankles. Her coach, Fletcher, said that at one tournament, she had an ankle injury that she probably shouldn't have been riding on in the first place, but she wanted to go so bad that when she couldn't find her tape for her ankle, she ended up taping her ankle in duct tape.

=== Sponsors ===
Natique Boats, Hyperlite Wakeboards, Breathe Boardwear, Orig Audio, Wakami, Rollei Action Cam, and Peripheral Life and Style

== Career profile ==
- 2014 IWWF Wakeboard World Cup (Mandurah, Australia) – first place, pro women's division
- 2013 IWWF Wakeboard World Cup (Palembang, Indonesia) – first place, pro women's division
- 2012 IWWF Wakeboard World Cup (Mandurah, Western Australia) – first place, pro women's division
- 2011 IWWF Female Wakeboarder of the Year
- 2011 IWWF Wakeboard World Cup (China) – second place, pro women's division
- 2011 IWWF Wakeboard World Cup (Malaysia) - first place, pro women's division
- 2011 Pro Wakeboard Tour (Knoxville, TN) –first place, pro women's division
- 2011 IWWF Wakeboard World Championships (Italy) – first place, pro women's division
- 2010 IWWF Wakeboard World Cup (South Korea) –first place, pro women's division
- 2010 Pro Wakeboard Tour (Ft. Worth, TX) –second place, pro women's division
- 2010 Board Up Miami – third place, pro women's division
- Silver Medalist at the 2009 World Games in Kaohsiung, Taiwan
- 2-time AWA Girls National Wakeboard champion
- 3-time WWA Girls National Wakeboard champion
- 2-time USA Girls Wakeboard National champion
- 2-time WWA Girls World Wakeboard champion
- 2-time World Champion USA Wakeboard Team member
- 2007 IWSF Girls Pan American Wakeboard champion
