= Bicycle Trail of the Former Borderland =

The Bicycle Route of Former Borderland is a Polish bicycle tourist route, traced and marked in 2012. Also known as route No. 465, located entirely in the city of Sosnowiec, the route leads along the former border of Prussia and the Russian partition, going from center of the city to the historic Three Emperors' Corner. For the most part, the trail runs through green areas in parks, forests, and revidersides. On most sections, the trail leads in close proximity to the Brynica River. It is run along paths or dirt roads with little or no traffic.

== Tourist attractions ==
The trail runs in the immediate vicinity of recreational areas and tourist attractions:

- Millennium Park
- Fusinski Park together with the Exotarium,
- The "Szopienice-Borki" nature and landscape complex, including:
  - "Morawa" pond,
  - "Borki" pond,
  - the "Stawiki" pond,
  - "Hubertus" pond,
- the "Rybaczówka" resort,
- Sandy Pits at the Czarna Przemsza River,
- the Jewish cemetery in the Modrzejów district,
- Three Emperors' Corner

== Parameters ==
- marking: red;
- length: 10.2 km;
- surface: 97% dirt roads and paths

== Connection to other routes ==
- Black Sea Bicycle Trail leading from the Three Emperors Triangle to the Zagórski Forest and Park named after Jacek Kuroń; Connection near the Triangle, via a rampart along Biała Przemsza;
- Yellow Bicycle Trail - route No. 476 of the city of Jaworzno towards the Sosina Lagoon and the Dziećkowice Lagoon (via the Green Trail); Connection in the area of the Three Emperors Triangle, through the embankment on both sides of Biała Przemsza and the bridge over Biała Przemsza at Orląt Lwowskich Street.
- Bicycle route No. 5 - leading, among others, to the Three Ponds Valley in Katowice; Connection in the Borki district, near the bridge on Brynica and the bridge over S86 - a path (dirt road) goes off to the southwest.
