= Nautique Boats =

Boat manufacturing company

Nautique
- Company type: Public
- Industry: Marine Industry
- Founded: 1961; 65 years ago
- Headquarters: Orlando, Florida, U.S.
- Key people: Bill Yeargan
- Website: nautique.com

Nautique Boat Company is an American boat manufacturer that produces boats primarily for waterskiing, wakeboarding and wakesurfing. With models in the Super Air Nautique and Ski Nautique lines, they are widely considered the gold standard in the inboard towboat market. Owned by parent company, Correct Craft, Nautique is a member of the oldest family-owned and operated boat manufacturer in the world.

== Ski Nautique ==
In 1961 Correct Craft released the original Ski Nautique, the first fiberglass ski boat of its kind designed by Leo Bentz. It was the world's first tournament inboard ski boat and paved the way for the modern day watersports boat.

Throughout the 60’s and 70’s, the Ski Nautique dominated the watersports boat market and was used in waterski shows and tournaments across the globe. In 1981, Nautique unveiled the Ski Nautique 2001. In 1986, SeaWorld signed a contract with Nautique to supply Ski Nautique boats for ski shows at their marine parks. During that same year the 25th anniversary of the Ski Nautique was released, called the Silver Nautique. The next iteration of the Ski Nautique was introduced in 1990 and by 1993 was switched over to fiberglass floor and stringer construction for increased durability. 1997 brought the Ski Nautique 196 with Total Surface Control (TSC) to the hull design for a customized wake for slalom, trick and jump skiers. Over the course of the next decade, Total Surface Control was developed into 2nd and 3rd generations until it was eventually phased out. The Ski Nautique 196 brought a new era to the waterski boat world as the reigning industry leader from 1997 until 2009.

In 2010, with the help of legendary waterskier and Team Nautique athlete Andy Mapple, the Ski Nautique 200 was released. This 3-event waterski boat is currently in production as the Ski Nautique 200 and is responsible for pulling 25 world records including Ryan Dodd's current jump record of 254 feet.

2019 brought the introduction of the current Ski Nautique. For the first time, Nautique introduced carbon fiber into the layers of the hull to drastically cut the weight of the boat while still keeping it strong.

== Super Air Nautique ==
In 1997 the first wakeboarding-specific boat was introduced by Nautique. The "Air Nautique" offered the very first manufacturer-supplied wakeboard tower with the Flight Control Tower® and also introduced internal ballast tanks as standard features. In 1999 Nautique changed the face of wakeboarding again with Total Wake Control (TWC) and later again in 2006 with HydroGate® that can change the shape of the wake on the fly. In 2007 Nautique brought a new speed control method into the watersports world called Zero-Off, a GPS-based system that maintains preset speeds. In 2012 Nautique completely changed the industry with the release of the Super Air Nautique G23. Nautique then developed two other G-Series models with the G21 and G25. In 2016, Nautique then blended what it learned with the Ski Nautique 200 and G-Series and created a multi-sport line called the GS-Series. These boats can be used to wakesurf, waterski or wakeboard. In 2019 Nautique released the Super Air Nautique G23 Paragon.

== Nautique Surf System ==
In 2013, Nautique started shifting their Super Air Nautiques to gear towards wakesurfers as well as wakeboarders and introduced the Nautique Surf System (NSS). The Nautique Surf System (NSS) consists of three major components: Ballast, Wave Plates, and fresh air exhaust system. The ballast tanks increase the weight of the boat while the waveplates redirect water to create a larger and smoother surf wave on either side of the boat. The exhaust is pointed downward directly in the water path of the propeller, this sends the carbon monoxide exhaust far behind the surfer that is riding behind the boat.

== Events ==
Nautique entered into an agreement with The Masters Water Ski Tournament in 1975 and continues to pull the event every year at Callaway Gardens in Pine Mountain, Georgia on Memorial Day weekend. The event originally included slalom, jump and trick waterskiing and has since added wakeboarding and wakeskating. Along with the Masters, Nautique is also the exclusive towboat for the WWA Wakeboard World Championships, the WWA US Wakeboard National Championships, the Moomba Masters, the Wake Open, and the IWWF Waterski World Championships

== Models ==
Model (2022)	Length (ft)	Dry Weight (lbs)	Max Factory Ballast (lbs)	Total Weight with Ballast, without Fuel or Passengers (lbs)	Horse Power (HP)	Torque (ft-lbs)	Passengers	Notes
GS20	20	4700	1700	6400	400 / 355 / 450	400 / 405 / 465	12	Completely redesigned hull for 2023
GS22	22	4900	2900	7800	400 / 355 / 450 / 475	400 / 405 / 465 / 500	15	Completely redesigned hull for 2023
G21	21	5800	2250	8050	450 / 475 / 600 / 370(diesel)	465 / 500 / 608 / 595(diesel)	14	Added supplemental ballast and redesigned flight tower to 2022.
G23	23	6000	2200 or 3650 with supplemental ballast option	8200 or 9650 with supplemental ballast option	450 / 475 / 600 / 370(diesel)	465 / 500 / 608 / 595(diesel)	16	Added supplemental ballast and redesigned flight tower to 2022.
G25	25	6400	2200 or 3650 with supplemental ballast option	8600 or 10,050 with supplemental ballast option	450 / 475 / 600 / 370(diesel)	465 / 500 / 608 / 595(diesel)	19	Added supplemental ballast and redesigned flight tower to 2022.
G23 Paragon	23	7200	2200	9400	600	608	16	
G25 Paragon	25	7400	2200	9600	600	608	19	
S25	25	5800	3150 or 3650 with supplemental ballast option	8150 or 8650 with supplemental ballast option	400/355/450/475/600/370	400 / 405 / 465 / 500 / 608	16	Introduced in June 2022
S23	23	5500	3150 or 3650 with supplemental ballast option	8150 or 8650 with supplemental ballast option	400 / 355 / 450 / 475 / 600	400 / 405 / 465 / 500 / 608	16	Introduced in August 2021
S21	21	5200	2650	7850	400 / 355 / 450 / 475 / 600	400 / 405 / 465 / 500 / 608	14	Introduced in September 2021
Ski Nautique	20	2945	400	3345	400 / 355 / 450	400 / 405 / 465	7	
Ski Nautique 200	20	3400	NA	3400	400 / 355 / 450	400 / 405 / 465	9	Based on the Ski Nautique hull with an open-bow design.

=== G-series ===
The Super Air Nautique G-Series is a wide body boat designed to produce a larger surfing wake. The boat comes in 3 lengths all weighing above 5000 lbs. In 2022 the G-Series boat's full ballast weight became heavier than the Paragon model with the addition of supplemental ballast and a telescoping flight tower.

=== S-series ===
In August 2021 Nautique introduced a new line of boats with the S23. The boat reintroduces a pointed bow, a feature that was discontinued with the end of the 210 and 230. As of June 2024, there are three available lengths, 25, 23 and 21 feet.

=== GS-Series ===
The GS-series is suited towards boaters that are interested in having access to wakeboarding, wakesurfing, and skiing. Wakesurfing/wakeboarding boats are traditionally heavier and deeper than ski boats and therefore don't make for the best wakes for this discipline. The GS-Series seeks to find a happy medium for this. The GS-Series consists of two lengths, 22 and 20 foot.

=== Paragon ===
The Super Air Nautique G23 and G25 Paragon was announced in 2019. It is the first boat Nautique has built that has a dry weight of over 7000 lbs. This boat is considered a more luxurious G-Series and also comes with increased performance. Added weight comes from a telescoping flight tower and recliner seats positioned in the transom of the boat. The Paragon also has a different prop from the traditional G-Series models.

=== Ski ===
The Ski Nautique line of boats, made up of the Ski Nautique and the Ski Nautique 200, provide a line of boats with shallower drafts that allow for smaller wakes suited to skiing. These boats are considerably smaller and lighter than their G, GS, and S counterparts. The Ski Nautique features Nautique Boat Company's "faceted hull" design whereas the Ski Nautique 200 does not, making it the only one in the lineup to do so. The 200 offers an open-bow design whereas the conventional Ski Nautique does not.

== Manufacturing ==
Nautique manufactures their Boats in Orlando Florida, their manufacturing facility included 2 private lakes used to test boats. Nautique announced in January, 2021 that they will be increasing their manufacturing capabilities and workforce. To do this, the company purchased a 300,000 square-foot facility just down the road from their current manufacturing facilities.

== Team Nautique ==
=== Wakeboarders ===
- Noah Flegel
- Danny Harf
- Mary Morgan Howell
- Tony Iacconi
- Rusty Malinoski
- Jeff Mckee
- Shaun Murray
- Cory Teunissen

=== Wakesurfers ===
- John Akerman
- Drew Drennan
- Noah Flegel
- Jodi Grassman

=== Water Skiers ===
- Josh Briant
- Ryan Dodd
- Pato Font
- Anna Gay
- Erika Lang
- Whitney McClintock
- Robert Pigozzi
- Neilly Ross
- Charlie Ross
- Jon Travers
