= Darin Shapiro =

American wakeboarder (born 1973)

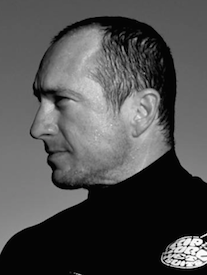

Personal information
- Full name: Darin Fane Shapiro
- Born: October 25, 1973 (age 53) Fort Lauderdale, Florida
- Occupation: Professional Wakeboarder
- Spouse: Heather

Sport
- Country: United States
- Sport: Wakeboarding
Medal record
Summer X Games
Representing United States
Gold medal – first place	1998 San Diego	Boat
Gold medal – first place	2000 San Francisco	Boat
Silver medal – second place	1997 San Diego	Boat
Silver medal – second place	1999 San Francisco	Boat
Silver medal – second place	2001 Philadelphia	Boat
Silver medal – second place	2002 Philadelphia	Boat
- Updated on August 16, 2016

Darin Fane Shapiro (born October 25, 1973), nicknamed "The Scud" is an American professional wakeboarder from Orlando, Florida and was one of the first successful riders to pioneer the sport. Shapiro is well known for landing the first ever double-flip on a wakeboard, which he named the "Speedball" as well as many other tricks which laid the foundation for what wakeboarding is today. After a 10-year retirement from wakeboarding, Shapiro returned to competition at age 40, at the 2014 Wake Games contest at Orlando Watersports Complex in Orlando, Florida.

Shapiro competed in his first pro contest on the island of Kauaʻi at the age of 17.

Shapiro appeared in many major wakeboard movies and influenced the development of the sport. He is considered to be the first rider to land an "Air Raley", which was named after one of his coaches in Team Hyperlite, Chet Raley. The first signature board ever in the industry was named the "Shapiro Pro Model" from Hyperlite.

In the early days of the sport, Shapiro was riding for Herb O'Brien who founded Hyperlite. O'Brien noted that the "Hyperlite Pro" board was responsible for the tremendous growth of the sport and Shapiro contributed with his demonstrations of excellent riding.

Shapiro also surfs and is a musician.

In 2010, Shapiro became the first pro wakeboarder to be inducted into the Water Ski Hall of Fame.

Darin Shapiro is a 12-time World Champion and influenced the sport of wakeboarding for nearly 20 years.

== Tournament results ==
3x triple crown champ, 12 overall world titles, 3x X Games, gold, silver, bronze, Gravity games gold, 4x masters champ, 3x Nautique Big Air champ, approximately 70 pro tour wins, and is the most winning rider in the history of the sport.

== Pharmaceutical activities and arrest ==
In between his initial championship career and his later return, Shapiro was involved in the running of two medical clinics in Florida alongside his brother and father. These clinics operated in less-than-legal circumstances, issuing prescriptions for large amounts of opioids These clinics were raided by law enforcement authorities and shut down.

Shapiro moved to the island of Kauaʻi in the fall of 2011. Facing questions, he stated that the move had nothing to do with his past run-ins with the law. After establishing himself on the island, he opened another clinic, becoming the owner of the only clinic on Kauaʻi's that would prescribe opioids and issue cards allowing for the possession of medical marijuana.

In 2012, drug officers with the Florida Department of Law Enforcement arrested Shapiro, his father, and his brother. Shapiro was extradited back to Orange County. Their clinics were shut down by law enforcement officers, and Shapiro, along with other members of the organization (namely, the issuing doctors and his family members), was charged and convicted.

Shapiro was eventually able to return to wakeboarding in 2014, being re-accepted by the community and given a second chance.

== See also ==
- Waterskiing
- Wakeboarding
- List of Water Skiing Hall of Fame Inductees
