= Reed Hansen =

American wakeboarder

Reed Hansen (born April 20, 1990) is a champion wakeskater.

Born in Orlando, Florida, Hansen currently resides in Groveland, Florida.

Hansen is sponsored by Ronix, Supra, WWC, Mossy Oak, Performance Ski and Surf of Orland, and Rockstar.

Hansen is an 11-time World Wakeboard Association (WWA) World Champion, 10-time national champion, 4-time Toe Jam Champion, 4 time Alliance wakeskater of the year, 3 time Battle Falls Champion, 3- time Transworld Wakeboarding Magazine Wakeskater of the Year, 3 Time Trick of the year winner, 3 time masters champion, 2 time wakeskatock Champion, 2 Time WWA Cable World Champion, 2 time National Cable Champion, and 2011 Alliance Wake Rider of the Year.
