= Betty Bonifay =

American water skier

Betty Bonifay is a professional water skier and mother to professional wakeboarders Shane and Parks Bonifay. In 1976, she and Sally Winter were instrumental in developing the technique for skiing on a 360-degree swivel binding that allowed turning in a full circle while on a single water ski. The 360 swivel ski debuted in the Cypress Gardens' Super Show in 1977.

She has been designing safer equipment for over 30 years and owns her own business in creating a new, foam-filled swivel ski. Bonifay is one of the first women to perform on a swivel ski, that has a rotating binding of 360 degrees. The Bonifay Ski School, located in Florida, is the only school in the world specializing in show skiing. She also travels all over the country to teach clinics to aspiring water skiers of any talent level.
