= Wakeboarding Unleashed Featuring Shaun Murray =

2003 video game

- Developer: Shaba Games (Note: Ported to Windows and Mac OS by Beenox. Small Rockets developed the Game Boy Advance version.)
- Publisher: Activision (Note: Released under the Activision O2 label. Published on Game Boy Advance, Windows and Mac OS by Aspyr.)
- Platforms: Game Boy Advance, Mac OS, Microsoft Windows, PlayStation 2, Xbox
- Release: PlayStation 2, Xbox: NA: June 10, 2003; EU: June 13, 2003; Game Boy Advance: NA: November 10, 2003; Windows, Macintosh: NA: December 22, 2003; EU: March 17, 2004 (PC); EU: June 6, 2004 (Mac)
- Genre: Sports
- Modes: Single-player, multiplayer

Wakeboarding Unleashed Featuring Shaun Murray is a 2003 extreme sports video game developed by Shaba Games and published by Activision under the Activision O2 label. It features wakeboarder Shaun Murray.

== Development ==
The game's working title was Shaun Murray's Pro Wakeboarder. A demo version of the game can be accessed from the options menu of the PlayStation 2 version of Tony Hawk's Pro Skater 4.

== Reception ==
Reception

Aggregate score
Aggregator	Score			
Aggregator	GBA	PC	PS2	Xbox
Metacritic	67/100	85/100	83/100	80/100

Review scores
Publication	Score			
Publication	GBA	PC	PS2	Xbox
Edge	N/A	N/A	5/10	5/10
Electronic Gaming Monthly	N/A	N/A	8.17/10	N/A
Famitsu	N/A	N/A	N/A	23/40
Game Informer	N/A	N/A	8.25/10	8.5/10
GamePro	N/A	N/A	4/5	4/5
GameRevolution	N/A	N/A	B	B
GameSpot	N/A	N/A	7.3/10	7.3/10
GameSpy	2/5	N/A	4.5/5	4.5/5
GameZone	5.9/10	8.5/10	8.9/10	8.9/10
IGN	7/10	N/A	8.6/10	8.4/10
Nintendo Power	3/5	N/A	N/A	N/A
Official U.S. PlayStation Magazine	N/A	N/A	4.5/5	N/A
Official Xbox Magazine (US)	N/A	N/A	N/A	9/10
The Cincinnati Enquirer	N/A	N/A	4/5	4/5
The Village Voice	N/A	N/A	N/A	8/10

The game received "favorable" reviews on all platforms except the Game Boy Advance version, which received "average" reviews, according to the review aggregation website Metacritic. Nintendo Power gave the Game Boy Advance version a mixed review, over two months before its release Stateside. In Japan, where the Xbox version was ported for release on December 25, 2003, Famitsu gave it a score of one six, one five, and two sixes for a total of 23 out of 40.
