= Rusty Malinoski =

Profesional wakeboarder

- Born: December 17, 1983 (age 42); Humboldt, Saskatchewan, Canada

Rusty Malinoski, known as Bone crusher, is a Canadian professional wakeboarder who was the first athlete to successfully land a 1080° in a wakeboard competition.

While Parks Bonifay and Danny Harf had both been recorded landing 1080s before, Malinoski was the first one to do it during an official pro tour event. He is also the first wakeboarder to land a 1080 twice. Over the years, Malinoski has earned the nickname "Bone crusher" because of his powerful riding style. Malinoski won the Pro Men’s U.S. Pro-Am Championship in 2005. As of 2012 Rusty Malinoski had finished every season in the top ten.

Malinoski was featured in wakeboarding DVDs such as Bent Felix, The Butter Effect and Slick City.

== See also ==
- Parks Bonifay
