= Radar Lake =

Lake in Washington, United States

- Location within Washington (state) Location within the United States
- Coordinates: 47°43′48″N 122°1′25″W
- Built: January 1, 1972
- Settlements: Woodinville, Washington

Radar Lake is located in Woodinville, Washington and is one of the first man-made lakes built specifically for water sports. The land it is built on was initially bought and developed by water sports innovator Herb O'Brien in 1972. O'Brien, drawing from his water sports experiences as a young man, envisioned Radar Lake to be an isolated and private area where enthusiasts could come and enjoy not only the thrill of the sport but also the pristine natural environment. In 1976, the property was bought by Seattle based owner of Radar Electric (now Radar Inc.) Wilbur McPherson who gave it its current name in honor of his company. McPherson and O'Brien maintained a close relationship, and O'Brien bought Radar Lake back from McPherson in 2000. McPherson continued to live on the property, along with O'Brien and their respective families, until he lost his life to cancer in 2007.

Herb O'Brien died in 2012.
