= Parks Bonifay =

American professional wakeboarder

- Born: September 30, 1981 (age 44); Lake Alfred, Florida, U.S.
- Occupation: Wakeboarder
- Years active: 1994-present
- Parent(s): Pete Bonifay and Betty Bonifay

Parks Bonifay (born September 30, 1981) is an American professional wakeboarder.

== Life and career ==
Bonifay was born in Lake Alfred, Florida. He became a professional wakeboarder in 1994. Parks began competing as a 14-year-old, winning the X-Games in his first visit. He has held many major titles including the Pro Wakeboard Tour titles in 1999 and 2001. He began waterskiing at the age of six months and 29 days old, setting a new world record.

He became the first documented wakeboarder to land the 1080 (a switch toeside 1080), doing so at a Bill Doster photoshoot in 1999.

Bonifay was a recurring star on MTV's extreme action sports show Nitro Circus. He is sponsored by Ronix, Fox, Red Bull, Spy, MasterCraft, and Performance Ski & Surf.

A full-length feature documentary on Bonifay's life was released on August 21, 2009, titled The Parks Documentary. It chronicles the story of his life, from his roots in water skiing and show skiing via his parents and grandparents, to his exploits, accomplishments, and overall success in the world of wakeboarding the past 12 years.

He resides in Auburndale, Florida.

== Filmography ==
=== Television ===
Year	Title	Role	Notes
2009	Nitro Circus	Himself	2 episodes
2009	Adrenaline Rush Hour	Himself	Episode 1.5; TV series documentary
2011	Momentum: What Drives You	Himself	Episode 3.5
2012	Roast of Parks Bonifay	Himself	TV special
2012	Ultimate Rush	Himself	TV documentary
2014	Parks Documentary: The Story of Parks Bonifay	Himself	TV documentary
2015	Wakecation	Himself	5 episodes
2015-2016	Worldies	Himself	2 episodes

=== Film ===
Year	Title	Role	Notes
2002	Jackass: The Movie		Construction crew member
2010	Jackass 3D	Himself	Guest appearance
2011	Jackass 3.5	Himself	Guest appearance
2012	Nitro Circus: The Movie	Himself	
2022	Jackass Forever	Himself	Guest appearance
2022	Jackass 4.5	Himself	Guest appearance
