= Shaun Murray =

American wakeboarder (born 1976)

- Born: April 28, 1976 (age 49)
- Occupations: Professional Wakeboarder, Nautique Spokesperson
- Years active: 1995-Present
- Known for: Professional Wakeboarder
- Spouse: Kerri
- Children: 3

Shaun Murray is an American four-time World champion wakeboarder, and the main character featured in Activision O2's video game Wakeboarding Unleashed Featuring Shaun Murray (originally under the working title Shaun Murray's Pro Wakeboarder) developed by Shaba Games and released on June 3, 2003 for PlayStation 2, Xbox and Game Boy Advance. A PC port was developed by Beenox and published by Aspyr, releasing on December 22, 2003. A playable demo version of the game was available in the Options menu for the PlayStation 2 version of Tony Hawk's Pro Skater 4.

== Early life ==
Shaun Murray first learning to water ski on San Diego Bay at the age of 8. In 1988. When he was 11 years old, his family went on a trip to Lake Shasta where he took a slalom lesson. Afterwards, his family rented a Skurfer from the local marina to try it out for the first time, this was his start with wakeboarding. The following year he moved with his family to Lake St. Louis, Missouri, where he honed his skills as a member of the Lake St. Louis Water Ski Club. After graduating from high school, he moved to Florida to ride for the Florida Southern College ski team and teach skiing at the Benzel Ski School. Murray decided he would take one semester off of school to focus on wakeboarding. But as he got better, he gained scholarships and joined some of the biggest teams in the sport. His career took off and he still has not been back to school because of his success.

== Career and accomplishments ==
Murray's wakeboarding career started in 1995 and has been full of innovation and accomplishment, including many Pro tour and World championship titles. He promoted his own "Backyard Tour" with pro-rider and friend Gerry Nunn, has been featured in many wakeboard movies, magazine and television pieces, created his own wakeboard instructional series entitled "Detention", and is the star of his own video game, Wakeboarding Unleashed. In the summer of 2004, Murray dislocated his knee while riding. He tore his ACL, PCL, and MCL. After reconstructive surgery he was told he might not ride again. But, just months later he was back riding. He has helped develop signature products that include boats, wakeboards, life jackets, wet suits, and clothing lines.

Murray ran wakeboard camps (The Boarding School) with friend Travis Moye from 2003 to 2013. The camp has continued with Moye at the Helm after 2013, but Murray had to leave that year after Nautique bought OWC cable park and asked him to spend more time there as a coach.

Murray has had dozens of wakeboard titles in his career which has spanned from 1998 to the present (2020). Murray was the first wakeboarder ever to land a 900 (regular hs). He is the only rider ever to hold World, Pro Tour and National champion titles at once, and was given a "Legend" award from Wakeboard magazine in 2005. He has also been in the final list of favorite male riders from Wakeboarding Mag's Reader's Poll at every single year since its inception. Murray's sponsors include Hyperlite, Fox, Nautiques, Reef, Jet Pilot, and Freestyle performance.

Murray was a contestant on the tv show American Ninja Warrior in 2014, 2015, 2016 and 2018. In 2015 he placed 25th in the qualifiers but was eliminated at obstacle #7 in the city finals.

== Personal life ==
Murray is married to Kerri Murray. The couple have three daughters. Murray is a Christian.

== See also ==
- Masters Tournament (water ski)
