= Brynica =

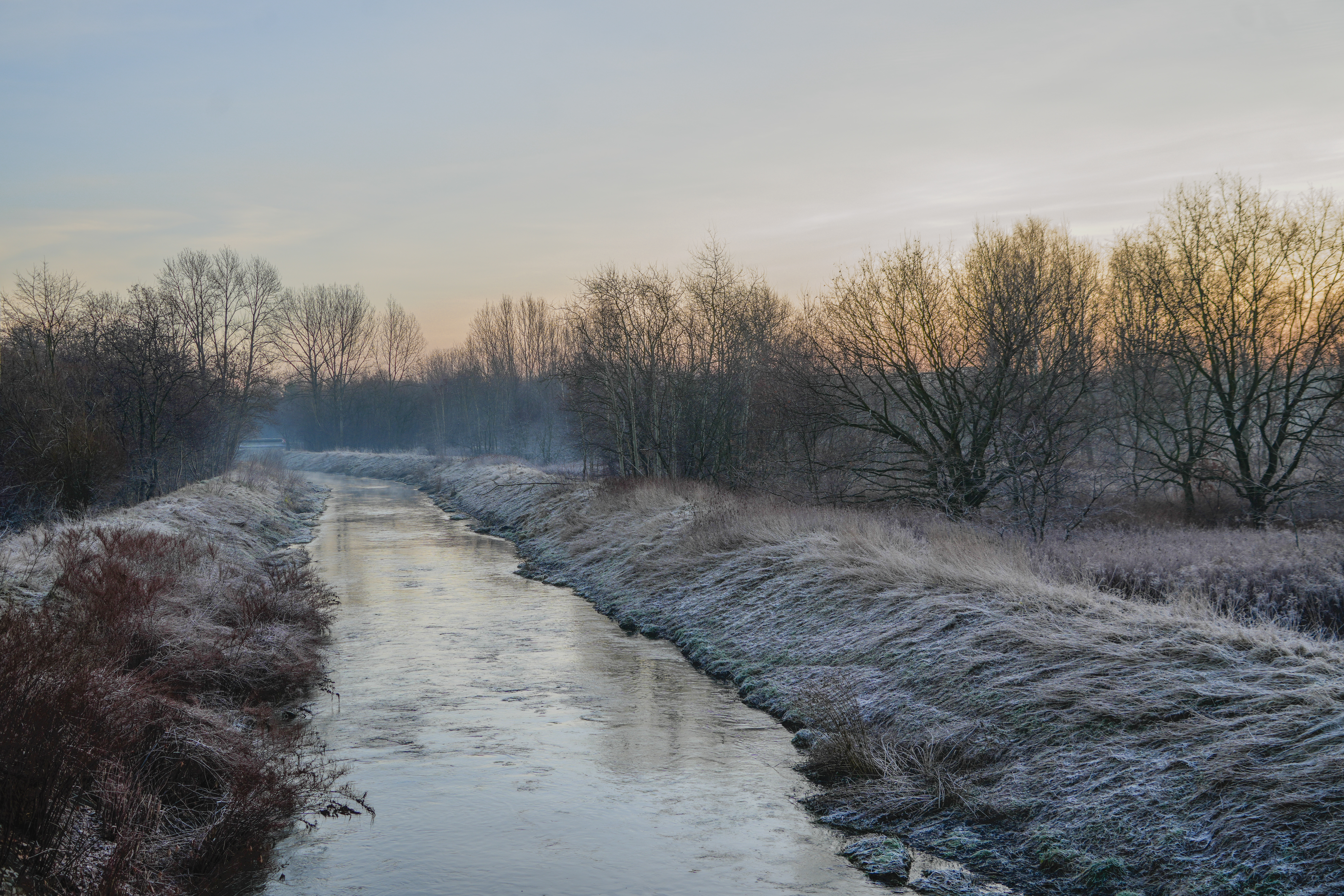
- Brynica on the border Katowice and Sosnowiec

Location
- Country: Poland

Physical characteristics
- Source
  - elevation: 350 m (1,150 ft)
- Mouth
  - location: Czarna Przemsza
  - coordinates: 50°15′32″N 19°08′14″E
- Length: 54.9 km (34.1 mi)
- Discharge
  - average: 483 km^{2} (186 sq mi)

Basin features
- Progression: Przemsza→ Vistula→ Baltic Sea

The Brynica (German: Brinitz) is a river in the Silesian Voivodeship of Poland. It has a length of 54.9 km (34.1 mi) and has a drainage basin area of 483 km^{2} (186 sq mi). The river is the main tributary of the Czarna Przemsza.

== Course ==
The river flows entirely within the Silesian Voivodeship. Its sources are located in the village of Mysłów, at the Próg Woźnicki, at an altitude of approximately 350 m above sea level. It flows through the municipalities of Koziegłowy, Siewierz, Mierzęcice, Miasteczko Śląskie, Świerklaniec, Bobrowniki, Piekary Śląskie, Siemianowice Śląskie, Czeladź, Sosnowiec, Katowice, and Mysłowice. The Brynica empties into the Czarna Przemsza near Mysłowice, at the border with Sosnowiec, carrying an average discharge of 3.7 m³/s.

== Tributaries ==
Tributaries of the Brynica include the Czeczówka stream, the Jaworznik brook, Rów Michałkowicki, Potok Ożarowicki, the Rawa brook, a second Rów, the Szarlejka stream, Rów Śmiłowskiego, Rów Świerklaniecki, Potok Trzonia, Potok Wielonka, and Rów Wschodni.

== Historical significance ==
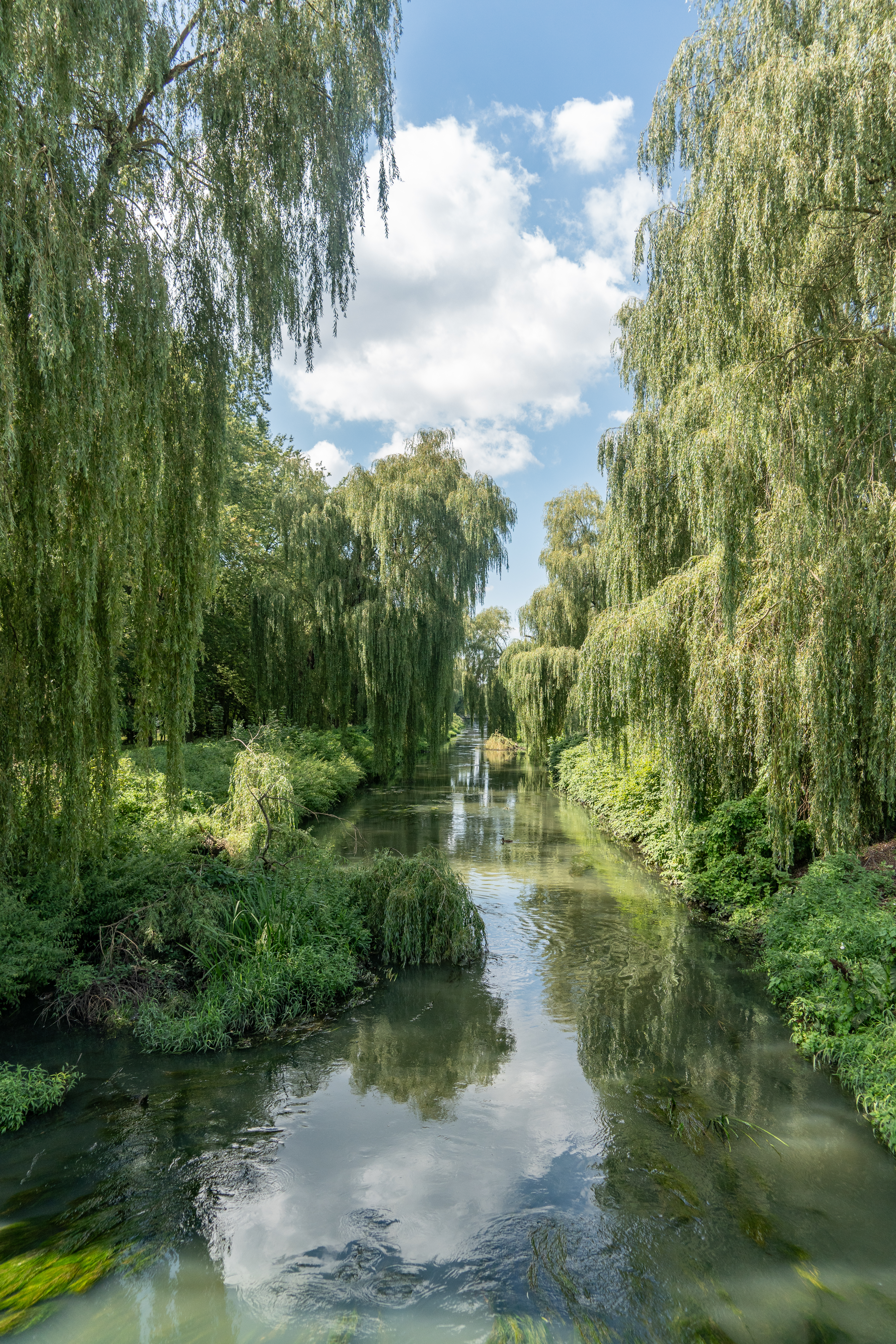
Brynica in Sosnowiec

The Brynica has historically served as a boundary between Silesia and Lesser Poland. In 1443 it marked the border between the Siewierz Duchy, purchased by Kraków bishop Zbigniew Oleśnicki, and the Cieszyn Duchy under the Kingdom of Bohemia. During the Silesian Wars (1740–1763), the course of the Brynica defined the state border between the Kingdom of Prussia and the Siewierz Duchy, which in 1790 was incorporated into the Polish–Lithuanian Commonwealth, later forming part of the Duchy of Warsaw (1807–1815) and then annexed by the Russian Empire following the Congress of Vienna in 1815. Between 1918 and 1922, it served as part of the Polish–German border. After the Silesian Uprisings, on 20 June 1922, in accordance with the provisions of the Geneva Convention on Upper Silesia of 15 May 1922, Polish troops under General Stanisław Szeptycki crossed the bridge over the Brynica between Szopienice and Sosnowiec, assuming control over the eastern part of Upper Silesia under Polish administration. One of the insurgents, Janusz Howaniec, symbolically broke the chains of subjugation—a moment commemorated by a plaque at the site.
