= Wakeskating =

Water sport

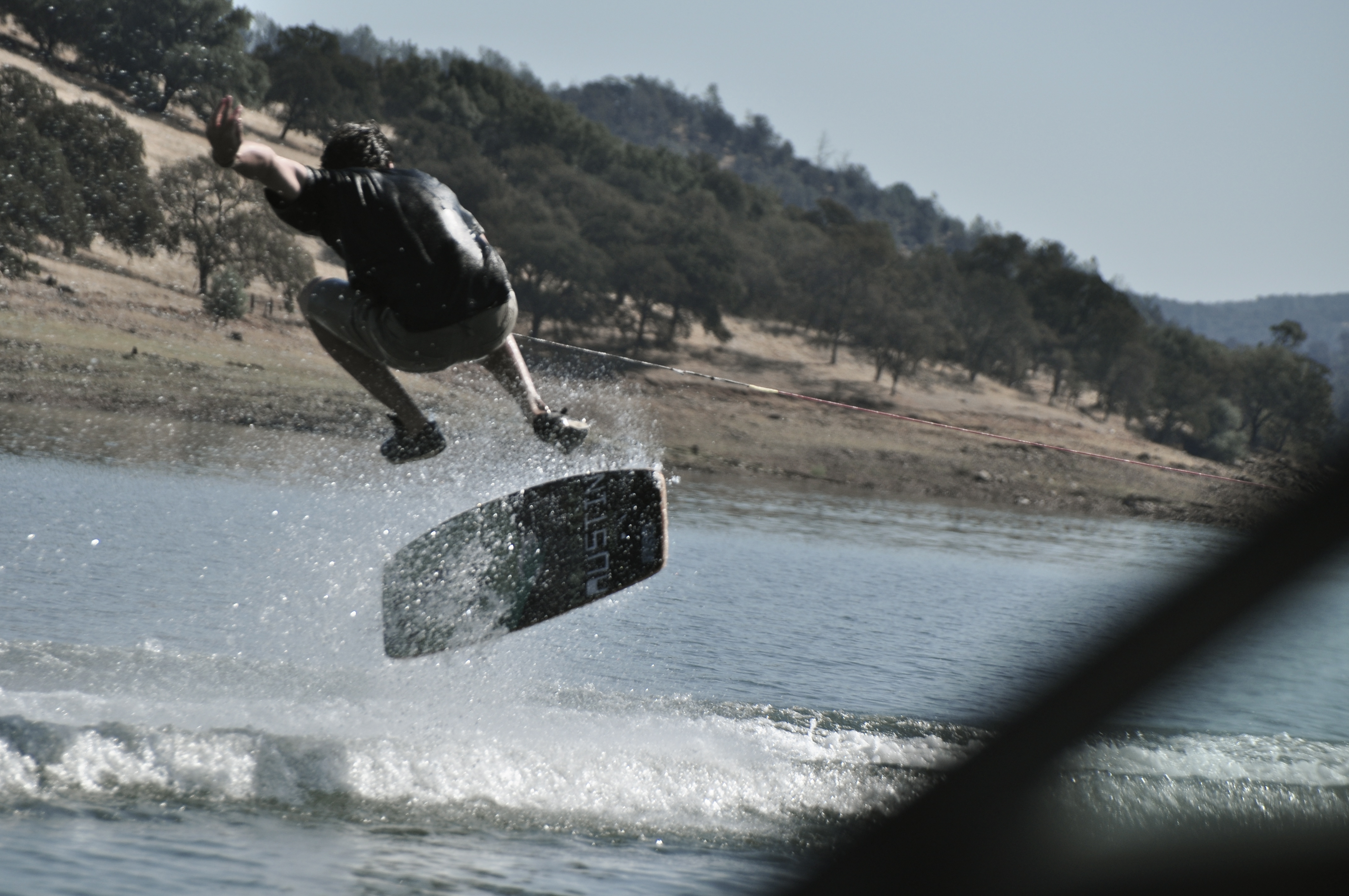
Wakeskating

Wakeskating is a water sport and an adaptation of wakeboarding that employs a similar design of board manufactured from maple or fibreglass. Unlike wakeboarding, the rider is not bound to the board in any way, similar to the skateboard, from which the name derives.

== Design ==
Fins are constructed of plastic, fiberglass or aluminum. Shorter fins must be deeper to get the same amount of tracking. A shallower fin does not track as well as a deeper one. But a deeper fin has more drag in the water, and does not release from the water as fast.

Wakeskating shoes are designed with quick drying materials and drainage channels. The drainage channels are a system of holes in the sole and channels through the midsole. Most wakeskate boards are made with grip tape on the upper side like skateboards. The grip tape is like sandpaper; it helps the rider to stay on the board and provides good traction, and is the main reason why rider wears shoes. Some boards are made with a foam instead of grip-tape, and can be ridden barefoot; the foam is easier on the skin than grip tape in case of a fall.

== History ==
Wakeskating was pioneered by Thomas Horrell in the United States. Wakeskating has become urbanized due to the advent of the "winch", a mechanical device with a small horizontal shaft engine that holds a spool of rope and pulls the rope at riding speed.

Wakeskates are characterised by five parameters: size, material, deck shape, deck surface and rocker type.

== Size ==
The appropriate length for a wakeskate depends on the rider's weight. A 39-inch wakeskate is suitable for a 180-pound rider. A wakeskate 41 or more inches long is best for a riders weighing 250 pounds or more. Shorter, lighter wakeskates are easy to maneuver and can be easily flicked, but they are comparatively unstable as the rider lands on the surface of the water. Larger wakeskates with more surface area are more stable.

== Material ==
Wakeskate may be made of wood, or a composite material. A wood wakeskate consists of a wooden skate coated with marine-grade epoxy that gives it a finished look and prolongs its life. However, wooden wakeskates do not last as long as composite ones as the wood degrades with constant exposure to water, and do not usually have a manufacturer's warranty.

More expensive composite wakeskates, made of synthetic materials that do not degrade quickly with exposure to water, are more popular especially among professional riders because of their lighter weight and longer life.

== See also ==
- Reed Hansen
- Skateboarding
