= Falcon Lake, Manitoba =

Human settlement in Manitoba, Canada

Coordinates: 49°41′11″N 95°19′34″W

Falcon Lake is an unincorporated urban centre at the western end of Falcon Lake situated in the southeasternmost section of the Whiteshell Provincial Park in the Canadian province of Manitoba. It is the major entry point to the Whiteshell from the Trans-Canada Highway. Three provincially operated campgrounds, Falcon Creek, Falcon Beach and Falcon Lakeshore, picnic areas, a swimming beach and adjacent public boat launch, several cottage lot divisions and numerous tourist services make the community a favored entrance point to the provincial park. In 2003, 40% of park visitors entered the park at the Falcon Lake checkpoint.

Falcon Lake was named after Pierre Falcon.

The Falcon Lake Golf Course is an 18-hole public course designed by Norman H. Woods. The course was constructed in 1957–58 and opened in 1958.

Falcon Beach Ranch offers horseback riding, sleigh and wagon rides. A riding stable at this location first began operation in 1959.

The Falcon Ridge Ski Slopes, established in 1960, offers alpine and cross-country skiing. A biathlon range was added to the facility in the mid-1980s as the host site for the Junior National Biathlon competition. and continues to be used for training and events. It is the site of the Falcon Lake Floppet, a nordic ski event held annually since 2018.

It is the birthplace of Megan Imrie, Canadian biathlete.

Beaver Days, an annual winter festival and fundraiser for the Whiteshell Community Club began in 1975. It includes a wide array of winter activities including snowmobiling, skiing, hockey, horse-drawn sleigh rides and skating.

The Falcon Lake Winter fish-off has been held annually since 2004. Hundreds of anglers gather to see who can catch the heaviest fish from the grid of holes the organizers have drilled through the ice.

It is known in ufology for the May 20, 1967, UFO sighting known as the Falcon Lake Incident. The 2010 album The Falcon Lake Incident was recorded at a cottage on Falcon Lake by Canadian singer-songwriter Jim Bryson.

== Demographics ==
In the 2021 Census of Population conducted by Statistics Canada, Falcon Lake had a population of 383 living in 177 of its 796 total private dwellings, a change of 40.8% from its 2016 population of 272. With a land area of 22.11 km^{2} (8.54 sq mi), it had a population density of 17.3/km^{2} (44.9/sq mi) in 2021.

== Climate ==
Falcon Lake has a humid continental climate (Köppen climate classification Dfb) with warm summers and severely cold winters. Precipitation is moderate, but is somewhat higher in summer than at other times of the year.

Climate data for Falcon Lake
Month	Jan	Feb	Mar	Apr	May	Jun	Jul	Aug	Sep	Oct	Nov	Dec	Year
Record high °C (°F)	8.3 (46.9)	11.5 (52.7)	19.4 (66.9)	32 (90)	34 (93)	38 (100)	36.7 (98.1)	36 (97)	35 (95)	28.5 (83.3)	23.9 (75.0)	9.5 (49.1)	38 (100)
Mean daily maximum °C (°F)	−11.8 (10.8)	−7.2 (19.0)	0.5 (32.9)	9.9 (49.8)	18.4 (65.1)	22.8 (73.0)	25.5 (77.9)	24 (75)	17.7 (63.9)	10.3 (50.5)	−0.9 (30.4)	−10.1 (13.8)	8.3 (46.9)
Daily mean °C (°F)	−18.3 (−0.9)	−14.2 (6.4)	−6 (21)	3.1 (37.6)	11.1 (52.0)	15.9 (60.6)	18.7 (65.7)	17.2 (63.0)	11.2 (52.2)	5 (41)	−5.6 (21.9)	−15.6 (3.9)	1.9 (35.4)
Mean daily minimum °C (°F)	−24.7 (−12.5)	−21.1 (−6.0)	−12.5 (9.5)	−3.8 (25.2)	3.7 (38.7)	9 (48)	11.9 (53.4)	10.3 (50.5)	4.7 (40.5)	−0.5 (31.1)	−10.1 (13.8)	−21.2 (−6.2)	−4.5 (23.9)
Record low °C (°F)	−45 (−49)	−45 (−49)	−41.1 (−42.0)	−30 (−22)	−12.5 (9.5)	−3 (27)	−1.7 (28.9)	−4 (25)	−7.8 (18.0)	−20.6 (−5.1)	−39 (−38)	−42 (−44)	−45 (−49)
Average precipitation mm (inches)	26.6 (1.05)	16.3 (0.64)	21.8 (0.86)	25.2 (0.99)	57 (2.2)	91.6 (3.61)	89.6 (3.53)	68.8 (2.71)	55.6 (2.19)	46.6 (1.83)	34.9 (1.37)	27.3 (1.07)	561.3 (22.10)
Source: Environment Canada

== Gallery ==
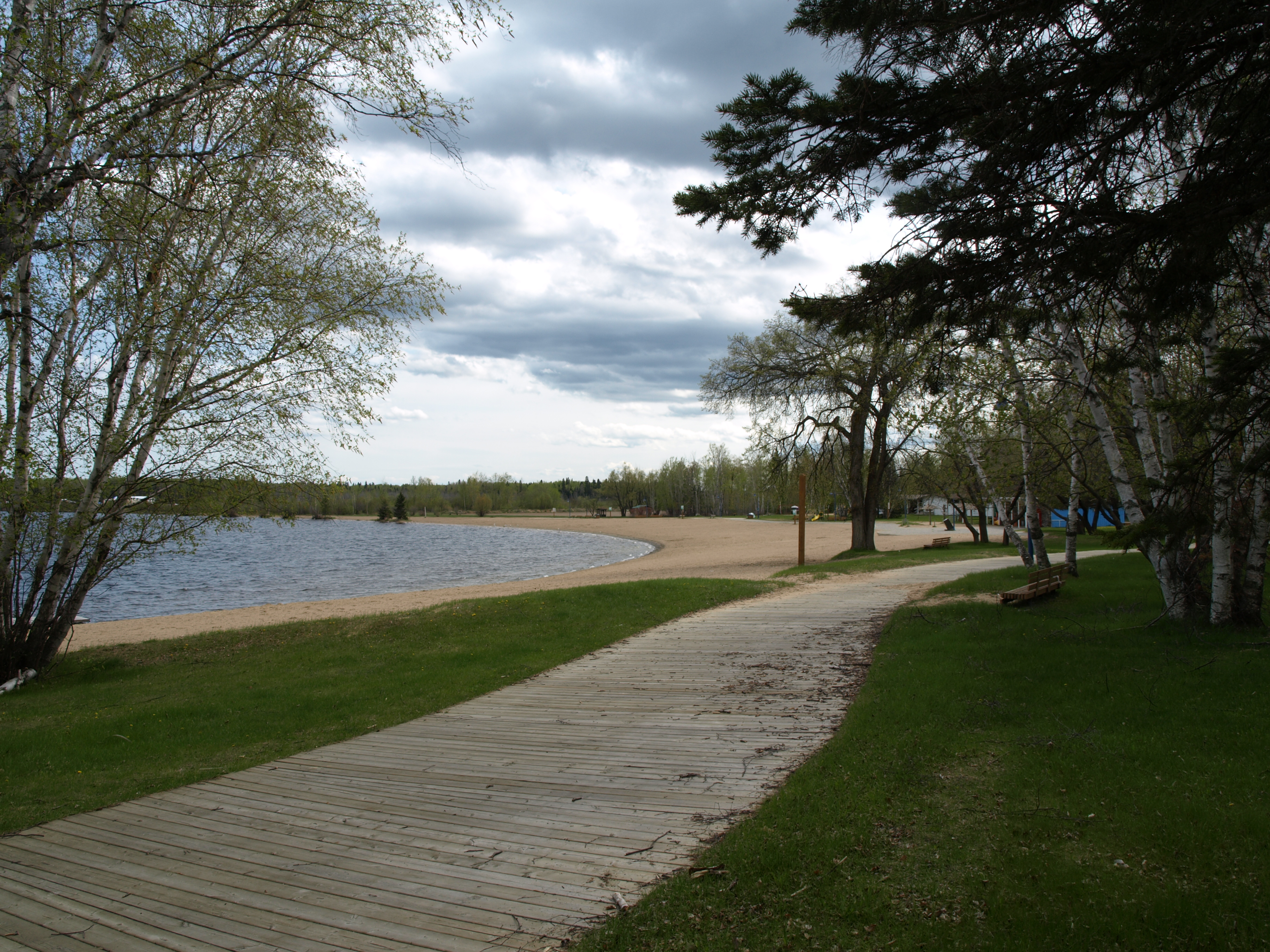
Falcon Lake

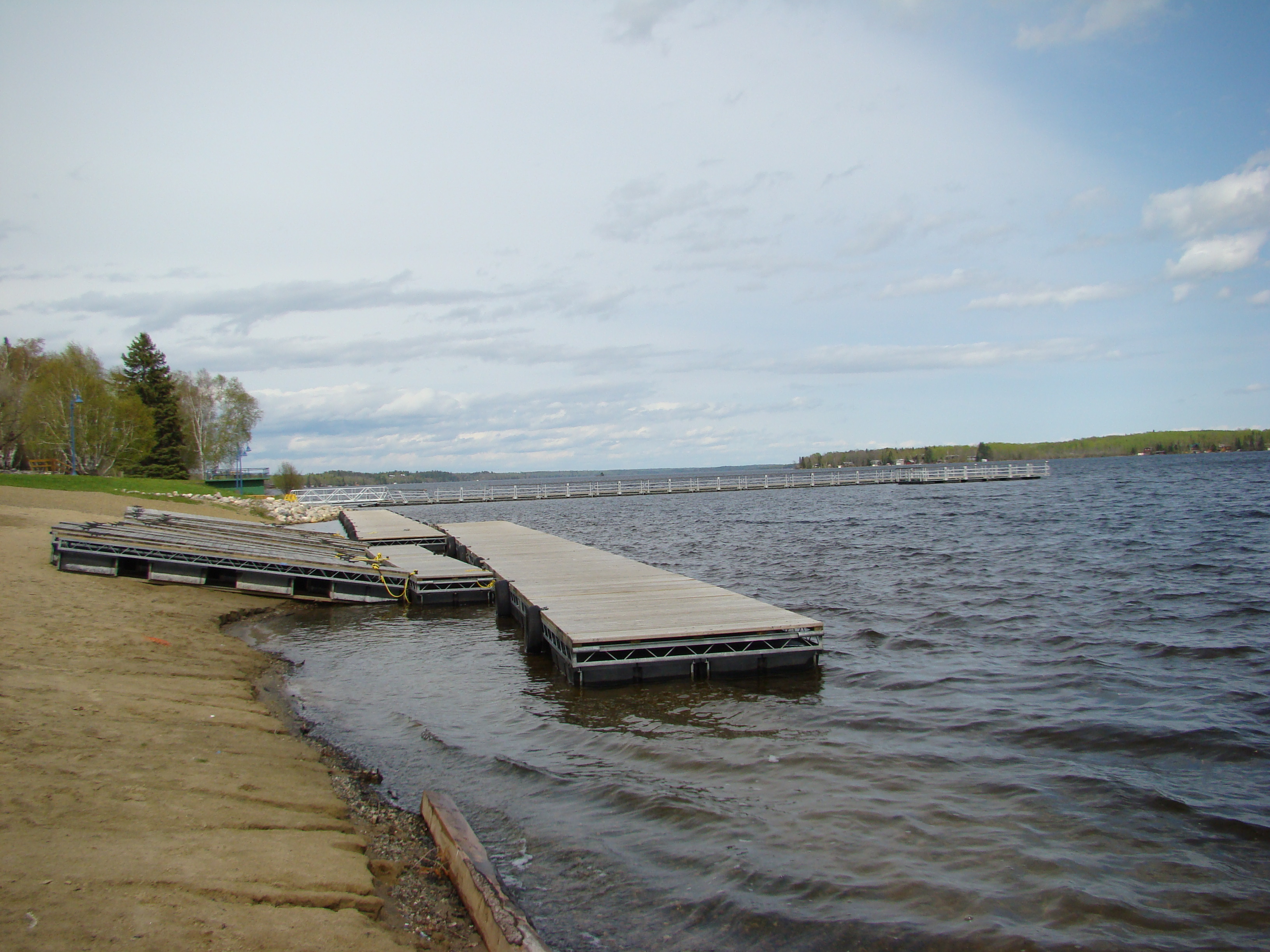
Piers at Falcon Lake

== See also ==
- Falcon Lake (Manitoba) the adjacent lake
