= The North Side Benches =

Studio album by Jim Bryson
- Released: 2 September 2003
- Genre: Folk, indie rock
- Length: 39:43
- Label: Orange
- Producer: Ian LeFeuvre; Jim Bryson

Jim Bryson chronology
The Occasionals (2000)	The North Side Benches (2003)	Where the Bungalows Roam (2007)

Professional ratings
Review scores
Source	Rating
AllMusic	4/5 stars
NOW	4/5 stars

The North Side Benches is the second album by Canadian singer-songwriter Jim Bryson. Recorded primarily in Ottawa, Ontario, where Bryson is based, the album was released in 2003.

A version of the song "Somewhere Else" was also recorded by alternative country singer Kathleen Edwards on her 2003 album Back to Me.

== Track listing ==
All songs written by Jim Bryson

1. "Sleeping in Toronto"
2. "Somewhere Else"
3. "The Lost Occasional"
4. "Elizabeth"
5. "Fleetwood"
6. "Captain Finch"
7. "Feel Much Better"
8. "Accidental Country Leaning"
9. "Mean Streak"
10. "At Least for Now"
11. "Broken Fingers"
