= Falcon Lake Incident =

Alleged UFO sighting in 1967

Steve Michalak posed with his drawing of a disc-shaped "flying saucer", as pictured in The Winnipeg Tribune on 22 May 1967

The Falcon Lake Incident was an alleged UFO encounter on 20 May 1967, at Falcon Lake, within Whiteshell Provincial Park in the Canadian province of Manitoba. Unlike typical UFO reports, the lone witness, Steve Michalak, claimed to hear human voices, said the craft was man-made, and claimed burns on his abdomen were caused by its exhaust. CBC News has called it "Canada's best-documented UFO case".

Initially telling police he was burned by a spaceship, Michalak later told the press it was a man-made aircraft, prompting investigations by law enforcement and the military. Despite agreeing not to disturb the site, Michalak unexpectedly visited it with another person and gave authorities objects he claimed he had collected from the site. When some of those objects tested positive for low-level radioactivity, chemists suggested the objects might have been contaminated with substances like radium-based paint, which was accessible at the time.

In 1968, Michalak told press his burns had returned and they photographed a grid-like pattern of marks on his abdomen that bore little resemblance to his earlier burns. A psychiatrist concluded the new wounds were likely self-inflicted. In 2017, CBC News quoted Michalak's son as saying: "If Dad hoaxed this – remember we're talking about a blue-collar, industrial mechanic – if he hoaxed it then he was a freakin' genius."

== Overview ==
On 20 May 1967, Steve Michalak reported to a passing member of the highway patrol that he had been burned by a "spaceship". Later that night, Michalak sought medical treatment for first-degree burns. Two days later, Michalak contacted the press, and the resulting media coverage triggered multiple civilian and official investigations in both Canada and the United States. On 23 May, a civilian UFO investigator photographed Michalak's torso, showing typical burns that were irregularly shaped and unevenly spaced.

Though he had promised not to disturb the site, on 26 June Michalak unexpectedly reported to authorities that he had returned to the supposed landing site to collect artifacts, including a burnt shirt, steel tape, and a soil sample. After a soil sample provided by Michalak tested positive for potentially dangerous levels of radioactivity, he led authorities to the landing site. While trace amounts of radiation were found, suggestive of a natural radium vein or perhaps contamination by a luminescent radium paint, nothing dangerous was detected.

Near the end of 1967, Michalak published his story in a booklet. The following January, he again contacted the press, which ran photographs of Michalak with a grid of uniform, evenly spaced marks on his abdomen that he described as burns that had come back. A Mayo Clinic psychiatrist who examined Michalak reported that his lesions were diagnosed as "obviously factitial," though they did not find overt evidence of significant mental illness.

== Spaceship report of 20 May ==
On Saturday, 20 May 1967, at approximately 3 p.m., Constable G. A. Solotki of the Falcon Beach Highway Patrol was driving on Trans-Canada Highway 1 when he was flagged down by Steve Michalak. Michalak warned the constable not to approach too closely, citing fears of spreading a skin disease or radiation. According to a police report from just days later, Michalak, a 50-year-old mechanic, reported seeing "two spaceships" that glowed red and rotated. He claimed he had touched the craft and that his hat and shirt had been burned; however, he refused to show the officer the burned shirt, claiming it was in the briefcase he was carrying. Solotki witnessed a burn on the hat but not on Michalak's head. Michalak showed marks that Solotki said appeared consistent with rubbing ash on the skin.

While Michalak claimed he had been prospecting, Solotki noticed he had no camping or prospecting equipment, nor a vehicle. Solotki reported that he felt Michalak "had been on a drunk and was suffering from a hangover". Solotki's report notes he did not smell alcohol on Michalak and that he offered to help him return to Falcon Beach and seek treatment, but the offer was declined.

Returning home to Winnipeg on a Greyhound bus, Michalak was treated that night for first-degree burns as an outpatient at the Misericordia Health Centre.

== Public claims of unidentified aircraft and human voices ==
23 May photograph of Michalak's burns, showing them as irregularly shaped and unevenly spaced

Michalak contacted The Winnipeg Tribune and was interviewed at his home by reporter Heather Chisvin. The paper subsequently published his account under the title "I was burned by UFO," along with a photo of Michalak posing with his drawing of the object he reportedly witnessed: a disc-shaped craft consistent with the classic "flying saucer".

On 23 May, papers throughout the region reported Michalak's claim of having seen strange objects at Falcon Lake the prior Saturday. According to Michalak, one of the objects landed; he described it as 35 feet (11 m) long and metallic. He stated that a door had opened, emitting bright violet light, air-hissing sounds, and voices that were "definitely human." Michalak reported speaking to the craft in multiple languages but received no response.

He was reportedly burned in a "checkerboard pattern" when the craft took off; the press quoted his family doctor as having examined the burns. Michalak also reported headaches, vomiting, rapid weight loss, and emitting a "foul smell" after his encounter. He claimed the craft had left behind a circular indentation where grass and leaves had been removed, which he presumed was caused by the craft's heat. A burnt undershirt was photographed, showing a grid-like pattern of marks that differed from his irregularly shaped burns.

=== Investigations ===
A photograph of a burnt undershirt provided by Michalak showing a grid of regularly spaced marks, unlike the irregularly shaped burns he suffered to his abdomen.

The incident was investigated by various Canadian authorities, including the Royal Canadian Mounted Police (RCMP), the Royal Canadian Air Force (RCAF), the Department of Health, and the Department of National Defence, as well as American authorities such as the Aerial Phenomena Research Organization (APRO) and the United States Air Force (as a part of the Condon Committee).

On 23 May, Michalak was visited by J. B. Thompson, a member of the UFO group APRO. Thompson photographed Michalak's burns, which medical records described as "several round and irregular shaped burns the size of a silver dollar." While Michalak claimed the burns formed a grid caused by exhaust from evenly spaced holes in the craft, Thompson's photo shows irregularly shaped, blotchy burns.

That same day, two members of the RCMP interviewed Michalak at his home. He reported having lost 13 pounds in the three days since the incident due to nausea, vomiting, headaches, and a strange taste and smell. The officers witnessed the burns on his abdomen, likening their appearance to "an exceptionally severe sunburn" localized to one spot. Michalak recalled his encounter with Constable Solotki and explained his unwillingness to show the officer his shirt by saying he feared he had been exposed to radiation and did not want to contaminate anyone. He further explained his previous reluctance to provide a specific location by claiming he had discovered a high-quality nickel strike nearby and wanted to protect the site. However, he offered to escort officers there once he was physically able.

Michalak showed the officers his burnt cap, melted grinder goggles, and burnt undershirt. The shirt was sent to a lab to be tested for radioactivity, but none was found. A partially melted glove was given to J. B. Thompson. On 25 May, the RCMP and the RCAF conducted an aerial search followed by a ground search. They found objects Michalak had mentioned discarding, such as a shopping bag and an old saw he had found along a trail, but failed to find the supposed landing site. On 26 May, police interviewed employees of the Falcon Hotel, who recalled that Michalak had consumed several beers the night before the incident, despite his denials of any alcohol use.

=== Michalak claims return to site ===
On 26 June, Michalak contacted the RCAF to report that he and a partner, Gerald Hart, had located the landing site over the weekend. Although he had promised to guide investigators to the location, he now refused to cooperate, citing concerns about his mineral claim. Despite previous instructions from authorities not to remove items from the site, Michalak reported that he had already collected several items, including his burnt outer shirt and soil samples.

The sample provided by Michalak was tested and found to be "highly radioactive." Consequently, officials swept Michalak's home for signs of radioactive materials and took possession of the remaining soil. In light of the lab report showing potentially dangerous radioactivity, Michalak reportedly became fully cooperative and agreed to lead authorities to the site. Upon arrival, investigators noted a semicircle where moss had been removed. While trace amounts of radiation were detected in a rock crevice, the levels posed no danger to life. Chemists suggested the radiation may have resulted from contamination by commercially available radium-based luminescent paint.

On 30 June, the press reported that Michalak's case was being investigated by defence authorities amid a surge of UFO reports in the area. The incident was featured in the May/June bulletin of the National Investigations Committee on Aerial Phenomena (NICAP). In October, the press reported that Michalak had been interviewed by Professor Ray Craig of the Condon Committee at the University of Colorado, and that Michalak had led the RCMP to the reported landing site, where they confirmed the presence of burnt vegetation. On 6 November, Minister of National Defence Léo Cadieux stated that the government would not publicly release the official investigation report.

A series of dramatic comic strips about the incident ran in newspapers in November 1967.

== 1968: burns allegedly return ==
In January 1968, eight months after his initial burns, Michalak was photographed with a grid of evenly spaced marks on his abdomen. The photograph is often mistaken for one depicting the burns of May 1967.

Late in the year, Michalak published his account in a 40-page pamphlet titled My encounter with the UFO, published in 1967 by Osnova Publications in Polish and retold by Paul Pihichyn, who had translated the account into English.

On 17 January 1968, The Winnipeg Tribune reported Michalak's claim that the burns had returned, noting he claimed they had previously returned once before. Michalak was photographed showing a grid of uniform, evenly spaced marks, which were significantly different from the unevenly shaped burns described in medical records and depicted in the Thompson photo eight months prior. Many sources mistook the 1968 grid marks for being the originally reported first-degree burns from May 1967.

On 6 August 1968, a psychiatrist at the Mayo Clinic in Minnesota examined Michalak. In the resulting report, the physician observed, "Despite the fact that his lesions have been diagnosed as obviously factitial, I can find no overt evidence of significant mental or emotional illness."

By October, American UFO conspiracy theorists had accused the Canadian and American governments of covering up the incident. By 14 November 1968, Michalak was himself accusing the government of a coverup to avoid a national panic. Editorials called on the government to release documents about the Falcon Lake sighting.

== Metallic debris claim ==
By November 1968, newspapers reported on a piece of metal that Michalak said he had found near the supposed landing site. The material was analyzed by professional astronomer and UFO researcher Peter Millman, who found it to be 95% silver but very slightly radioactive, on a level likened to a glow-in-the-dark wristwatch. Millman suggested the metal had been dipped in pitchblende to create a hoaxed artifact.

== Skeptical reaction ==
Skeptics of the Falcon Lake UFO Incident state that Michalak's burns were a result of an accident stemming from alcohol use, and that his claim was made to hide their true cause. In reporting the incident, Michalak likely intended to dissuade any competitors from prospecting at his site. The subsequent frenzy by the public and media caused the reverse effect, however, with numerous individuals descending upon the site. The pieces of melted, radioactive metal were purported by skeptics of the case to have been planted after the incident to solidify the hoax.

John B. Alexander, writing in the Journal for Scientific Exploration, states that some of Michalak's long-lasting effects, including the skin lesions, which he claimed were due to exposure to the exhaust blast, were a result of an allergic reaction. Alexander highlighted the inconsistencies within Michalak's testimony regarding the event.

Aaron Sakulich, writing for the Iron Skeptic, agrees with the alcohol-use explanation. Michalak's inconsistencies in his testimony when discussing his interactions with highway patrol officer G. A. Solotki, as well as the nature of the drinks Michalak had prior to the incident, were of note. Michalak's claims about his interactions with G. A. Solotki are directly disputed by Solotki's own report for the RCMP the night of the incident, which stated Michalak was reluctant to answer questions despite his visible burns and possibly inebriated state. By claiming he was the victim of a UFO-related attack, Michalak could deflect attention away from prospecting competition on a site where he had already staked a claim.

== In popular culture ==
The incident was featured in Unsolved Mysteries (Season 5, Episode 8), where Michalak was interviewed about his account of the events alongside dramatic reenactments.

In 2010, singer-songwriter Jim Bryson and The Weakerthans released the album The Falcon Lake Incident, which was named after the event and recorded in a cottage at Falcon Lake. Speaking with the National Post, John K. Samson stated that he "[did not] believe in extraterrestrials" but "certainly believes in people's encounters." The 2013 film Rulers of Darkness was inspired by the events. In the film, the protagonist's mother is killed by burns from a UFO at Falcon Lake, mirroring Michalak's claims.

Fifty years after the incident, Michalak's son, Stan Michalak, and ufologist Chris Rutkowski published When They Appeared—Falcon Lake 1967: The Inside Story of a Close Encounter, which compiled the case according to eyewitness testimony. Other books on the subject include George Dudding's The Falcon Lake UFO Encounter.

In 2018, the Royal Canadian Mint commemorated the 50th anniversary by issuing a $20 non-circulating silver coin as part of its Canada's Unexplained Phenomena series. Illustrated by Joel Kimmel, the coin features glow-in-the-dark elements, the first coin to have this trait, with beams emanating from the craft's underside. The front side depicts Queen Elizabeth II, while the back shows Michalak falling from an exhaust blast in the Manitoba wilderness while a UFO hovers above him. Only 4,000 coins were made, initially retailing for $129.95.

Documents and burned articles of clothing pertaining to the incident were donated to the University of Manitoba Archives in 2019. Falcon Beach Ranch, owned by Devin and Kendra Imrie, who inherited the land containing the alleged landing site, offers a "UFO Tour" for visitors wishing to explore the area.

== See also ==
- Lonnie Zamora incident: a police officer reported two humans operating an egg-shaped craft.
- Cash–Landrum incident: a family alleged they saw a USAF craft that caused adverse health effects.
- UFO sightings in Canada
- List of UFO sightings
