= Glenfern =

Glenfern may refer to:

- Glenfern, Queensland, Australia, locality near Kilcoy
- Glenfern, Tasmania, Australia, locality in the Derwent Valley
- Glenfern House in St Kilda East, Victoria, Australia
- Glenfern Sanctuary Regional Park in New Zealand's Hauraki Gulf
- "Glenfern", song on Kathleen Edwards' 2020 album Total Freedom
- Livezey House in Philadelphia, Pennsylvania, also known as Glen Fern
