= Alicia Ross =

Canadian murder victim

- Born: February 8, 1980; Markham, Ontario, Canada
- Died: August 17, 2005 (aged 25); Markham, Ontario, Canada
- Cause of death: Blunt force trauma
- Body discovered: September 21, 2005

Alicia Ross (February 8, 1980 – August 17, 2005) was a young woman from Markham, Ontario, Canada whose disappearance in August 2005 and the resulting investigation became the subject of international media coverage. After the initial widespread suspicion of Ross' boyfriend, her next-door neighbour turned himself in to authorities and was sentenced to life in prison for second degree murder.

== Disappearance ==
On the morning of August 17, 2005, Alicia Ross, a Hewlett Packard employee, mysteriously disappeared. Her boyfriend, Sean Hine, went to her house after she failed to answer a call on her cell phone for the second time (he had reportedly tried to contact her just after midnight, and again at around 10:00 am on the 17th). Nobody answered the door, even though Ross' car was still in the driveway. Hine reported her disappearance to the police. He then contacted the family, and Ross' parents rushed home. Ross' mother, Sharon Fortis, later wrote:

Sean called 911 to report Alicia missing. He'd tried to reach her the night before when he got home — no response from her cell phone. No response again in the morning. She hadn't shown up for work. He then contacted my husband and I, and we rushed home to find the street covered with York Region Police cars, and the house filled with police officers — all looking for Alicia. In Alicia's room were her cell phone, her purse, her cigarettes, her keys. Her bed had not been slept in. Her laundry lay folded, ready to be put away. Her ring was by the bathroom sink — she'd washed for bed. Her car was in the driveway — she'd never gone to work. The backyard was strewn with Alicia's shoes, a glass, a cigarette, and the back yard gate had been left open. A sickness fell over us.

The fact that none of Ross' important belongings were missing led police to suspect that something may have happened to her, although they did not immediately deem the case "foul play". Initially, her current boyfriend and ex-boyfriend were questioned, although neither were reported to be suspects in the case. Hine had last seen Ross at 12:00 midnight the night before, and her family last saw her at 11:00 pm on August 16.

By August 19, a police crew and 60 volunteers had been scouring nearby ravines around Ross' Markham, Ontario home. By August 20, nearly 400 volunteers and over 60 police officers were participating in the search for Ross. Police had to turn down volunteers and requested only 100 volunteers per day to help them in their efforts. The search continued for several days, and was reported on the American TV show America's Most Wanted.

The search was scaled down while Hine came under increased interrogation and was "feeling the heat" from the police investigation. On August 25, Hine's neighbourhood was canvassed; although he was "not a suspect", neighbors were asked whether they had seen Hine taking out trash on August 17, or anything suspicious.

On August 29, the National Post reported that Ross' boyfriend Sean Hine had stopped cooperating with investigators and refused to take a polygraph test. However, in private phone calls with Ross' mother Sharon Fortis, he had "told her how much he misses her daughter and asks how she is coping." News began to surface that Hine considered himself "pretty much the prime suspect" of the investigation, and of his somewhat unusual decision to report her missing after she failed to answer just two phone calls.

Media attention to the case began to wane in late August due to the lack of new leads and the ongoing devastation of Hurricane Katrina in the southern United States. On September 2, 2005, the York Regional Police dismantled their campaign post in Thornhill, Ontario, because students were returning to the school they had been using as their command centre.

The case lay dormant for over a week, until Jennifer Teague, an 18-year-old woman in Ottawa, Ontario was reported missing, and Ross' mother Sharon Fortis once again became the subject of stories about how she and the family were coping and looking for closure in Alicia's disappearance.

== Body found ==
On September 21, over a month after Ross' initial disappearance, and just days after the body of slain 18-year-old Jennifer Teague was discovered, The Globe and Mail reported that the body of Alicia Ross had been found, and that police had taken one person into custody. The body was found more than 50 miles from Ross' Markham home, where she was last seen by her family and her boyfriend of six weeks on the night of August 16, to a wooded area outside the small village of Creswell, Ontario. Ross' neighbour, 31-year-old Daniel Sylvester was charged with second-degree homicide, after turning himself in, in the company of a lawyer, to police. The Edmonton Sun said,

With public suspicions firmly focused on Sean Hine, Alicia's boyfriend and the last known person to have seen her before she disappeared, the news that her next-door neighbour, an enigmatic and little-known character on his own street, had been arrested shocked the city.

Toronto Sun columnist Mike Strobel wrote an apology piece to Sean Hine on behalf of a "presumptuous public", and Sean's father, Ken Hine went on to speak to the Toronto Sun and "set the record straight," saying that his son was "going through a lot of emotions" and "finding out his girlfriend was murdered and not coming back."

== Immediate aftermath ==
On October 6, 2005, more than 50 days after Alicia Ross' disappearance, friends, family, and mourners held an "emotional farewell" to Alicia Ross. 500 people filed into a Toronto, Ontario synagogue to mourn the passing of Alicia Ross.

On January 19, 2006, Daniel Sylvester made a video court appearance in Newmarket, Ontario, for his preliminary hearing.

On January 20, 2006, CTV reported that the Ross/Fortis family was releasing a website, www.aliciaross.ca, in memory of Alicia Ross. In March 2006, Sharon Fortis announced the creation of a scholarship named after Alicia Ross and Greg Rogers, a boyfriend of Ross' who died in a car crash in 1999. The money would be raised by a Greg Rogers memorial hockey game fundraiser.

== Murder trial ==
On July 4, 2006, Daniel Sylvester went to court for a preliminary hearing.

The murder trial began May 7, 2007 – nearly a year-and-a-half after Ross' initial disappearance – with a jury of 8 women and 4 men. Sylvester attempted to plead guilty to manslaughter in the death of Ross, which would have suggested that the lawyers would try to argue that the death was unintentional, but the plea was rejected by the court. Prosecutor Kelly Wright stated:

He told police he encountered her and they exchanged words ... He slapped her on the face. He pushed her on the ground and drove his knee into her solar plexus several times. He took her head and banged it into the ground several times," the prosecutor said. Mr. Sylvester lined the inside of his truck and put the body of Ms. Ross inside. He cleaned up the blood, had a shower and drove about 80 kilometres northeast of his home to a wooded area near the town of Manilla. Some of the remains were transferred three weeks later by Mr. Sylvester to the Coboconk location, said Ms. Wright.

The courtroom testimony saw Sylvester describing himself as a "fringe" individual who did not do well with other people. According to testimonies, Sylvester advanced upon Ross shortly after her boyfriend had left.

Sylvester said that during the argument with Ross, she called him a name, which made him snap. "She insulted me and called me a loser and that's what really got me going," he said on the video. Asked by McViety if he'd ever been called that name before, he responded: "Yes, many times throughout high school and ... even grade school. I just have social difficulties with other kids. I have anxiety problems," he said.

... McViety asked him to pen a letter to Ross and her family. "I don't know what I'd say," he told the detective as he started sobbing uncontrollably.

"I would say I had no right to take your daughter's life," he cried, turning away from the detective and facing a wall. Through his tears, he wrote a two-sentence note to Ross's family: "I am beyond words. I cannot possible express how sorry I am for what I have (done)." McViety left the interview room, but the tape was still rolling. Sylvester could barely be heard talking to himself: "I should never have been born." Earlier in the tape, Sylvester said he regretted the grief he had caused his mother: "I told her that ... I'd never do this to hurt you, I'd never put you in this position. All the shame and humiliation you're going to have to bear being associated with me... You know that she doesn't need that. (She's) 71."

In his confession to police, Sylvester stated that he had also confessed to a Catholic priest at a nearby church.

The trial was based on the question of whether Sylvester had intended to kill Ross, which would lead to a second-degree murder conviction, or whether there was no premeditation nor intention to kill Ross, which would lead to a manslaughter conviction.

In the end, after three hours and 45 minutes of deliberation, the jury was beyond a reasonable doubt in their decision that Sylvester either intended to kill his next-door neighbour Ross between their Markham houses on Aug. 17, 2005, or that he had used force he knew could kill her and acted reckless in allowing the death to happen.

Sylvester was convicted of second-degree murder and given a life sentence, with no parole possibility for 16 years. The earliest he will be eligible for parole is September 20, 2021.

== Cultural impact ==
The search for Alicia Ross and the subsequent events were widely reported throughout the Canadian media, and internationally as well. The untimely disappearance of a young woman about to enter a very exciting and productive period in her life shocked the nation, and Montreal's 940 News wrote about "the fear it evoked across the country."

Canadian singer-songwriter Kathleen Edwards, on her 2008 album Asking for Flowers, wrote a song entitled "Alicia Ross," written from the perspective of the young woman in her last moments of life.

== See also ==
- List of solved missing person cases (2000s)
