= Where the Bungalows Roam =

Studio album by Jim Bryson
- Released: 27 March 2007
- Recorded: Little Bullhorn Ottawa; The Woodshed Toronto
- Genre: Folk; Indie rock
- Label: Kelp; Saved by Vinyl

Jim Bryson chronology
The North Side Benches (2003)	Where the Bungalows Roam (2007)	Live at the First Baptist Church (2008)

Professional ratings
Review scores
Source	Rating
Edmonton Sun	4/5 stars
Ottawa Citizen	4/5 stars

Where the Bungalows Roam is the third album by Canadian singer-songwriter Jim Bryson, released 27 March 2007 on Kelp Records.

== Track listing ==
All songs written by Jim Bryson, except as noted

1. "Flowers"
2. "If by the Bridge"
3. "Pissing on Everything"
4. "Clear the Crowds"
5. "The Wishes Pile Up"
6. "Fire Watch" (Bryson and Ken Babstock)
7. "Don't Fail Me Now" (Sinkhole)
8. "All the Fallen Leaves"
9. "My Marie of the Sea"
10. "Death by Vibration" (Miche Jette)
11. "The Options"
12. "Humling" (vinyl only)
