= Live from the Bowery Ballroom =

Live album by Kathleen Edwards
- Recorded: June 2003, Bowery Ballroom, New York City
- Genre: Country

Live from the Bowery Ballroom is a live album by Kathleen Edwards. Side one is an audio CD of three performances captured live at New York City's Bowery Ballroom in June 2003. Two tracks are live performances of songs from Edwards' debut album Failer, and one is a cover of AC/DC's "Moneytalks". Side two is a DVD containing her videos for "Six O'Clock News" and "One More Song The Radio Won't Like".

== Track listing ==
1. "National Steel" – 5:01
2. "Hockey Skates" – 6:07
3. "Moneytalks" – 3:54
4. "Six O'Clock News" – 4:34
5. "One More Song the Radio Won't Like" – 4:23
