= Live at the First Baptist Church =

Live album by Jim Bryson
- Released: 2008
- Recorded: February 22, 2008; First Baptist Church, Ottawa, Ontario
- Genre: Folk; Indie rock
- Label: Kelp

Jim Bryson chronology
Where the Bungalows Roam (2007)	Live at the First Baptist Church (2008)	The Falcon Lake Incident (2010)

Live at the First Baptist Church is a live album by Canadian singer-songwriter Jim Bryson, released in 2008 on Kelp Records. Most of the album was recorded at Ottawa, Ontario's First Baptist Church; however, the album also includes two songs which were recorded for CBC Radio at the Black Sheep Inn in Wakefield, Quebec on December 9, 2006.

== Track listing ==
All songs written by Jim Bryson, except as noted.

1. "Flowers"
2. "If by the Bridge"
3. "Firewatch"
4. "Pissing on Everything"
5. "Feel Much Better"
6. "The Lost Occasional"
7. "Impaler"
8. "Elizabeth"
9. "Satellite"
10. "Captain Finch"
11. "All the Fallen Leaves"
12. "Somewhere Else"
13. "The Wishes Pile Up"
14. "Clear the Crowds"
15. "Sleeping in Toronto"†
16. "Mean Streak"†

=== Notes ===
† – Wakefield show.
