= Shag Harbour UFO incident =

Alleged UFO crash off the coast of Nova Scotia

Coordinates: 43°30′N 65°42′W

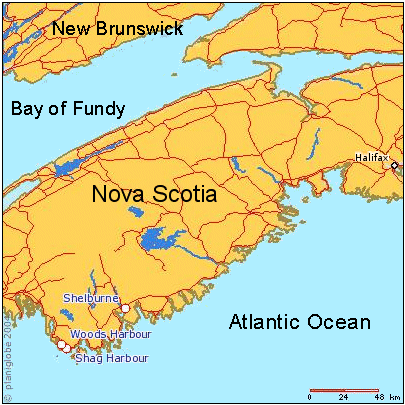
- Map of Nova Scotia showing Shag Harbour, Woods Harbour, Shelburne, and Halifax, mentioned in article
- Date: 4 October 1967
- Location: Shelburne County, Nova Scotia, Canada

The Shag Harbour UFO incident was the reported impact of a large, unknown object into waters near Shag Harbour, Nova Scotia, a small fishing village on the Atlantic coast, on 4 October 1967. The reports were investigated by various Canadian civilian (RCMP and Canadian Coast Guard) and military (Canadian Forces Navy and Air Force) agencies as well as the U.S. Condon Committee.

== Pre-incident aerial phenomena ==
=== Air Canada flight 305 ===
Flight 305 was serviced by a plane bound from the Halifax International Airport to Toronto. While flying over Sherbrooke and Saint-Jean, Quebec at 3,658 metres (12,001 ft), Air Canada First Officer Robert Ralph pointed out to Captain Pierre Charbonneau that there was something strange out the left side of the aircraft at 7:15 pm. In his report, the captain reported an object tracking along on a parallel course a few miles away. He described it as a brilliantly lit, rectangular object with a string of smaller lights trailing behind it. At 7:19 pm, the pilots noticed a sizeable silent explosion near the large object. Two minutes later, a second explosion occurred which faded to a blue cloud around the object.

=== Yellow object ===
Darrel Dorey, his sister Kaykay, and his mother were sitting on their front porch in Mahone Bay, when they noticed a large object manoeuvring above the southwestern horizon. The next day, he wrote a letter to RCAF Greenwood Base Commander asking what was flying over the water that evening, as he had never seen anything like it.

=== MV Nickerson of Sambro, Nova Scotia ===
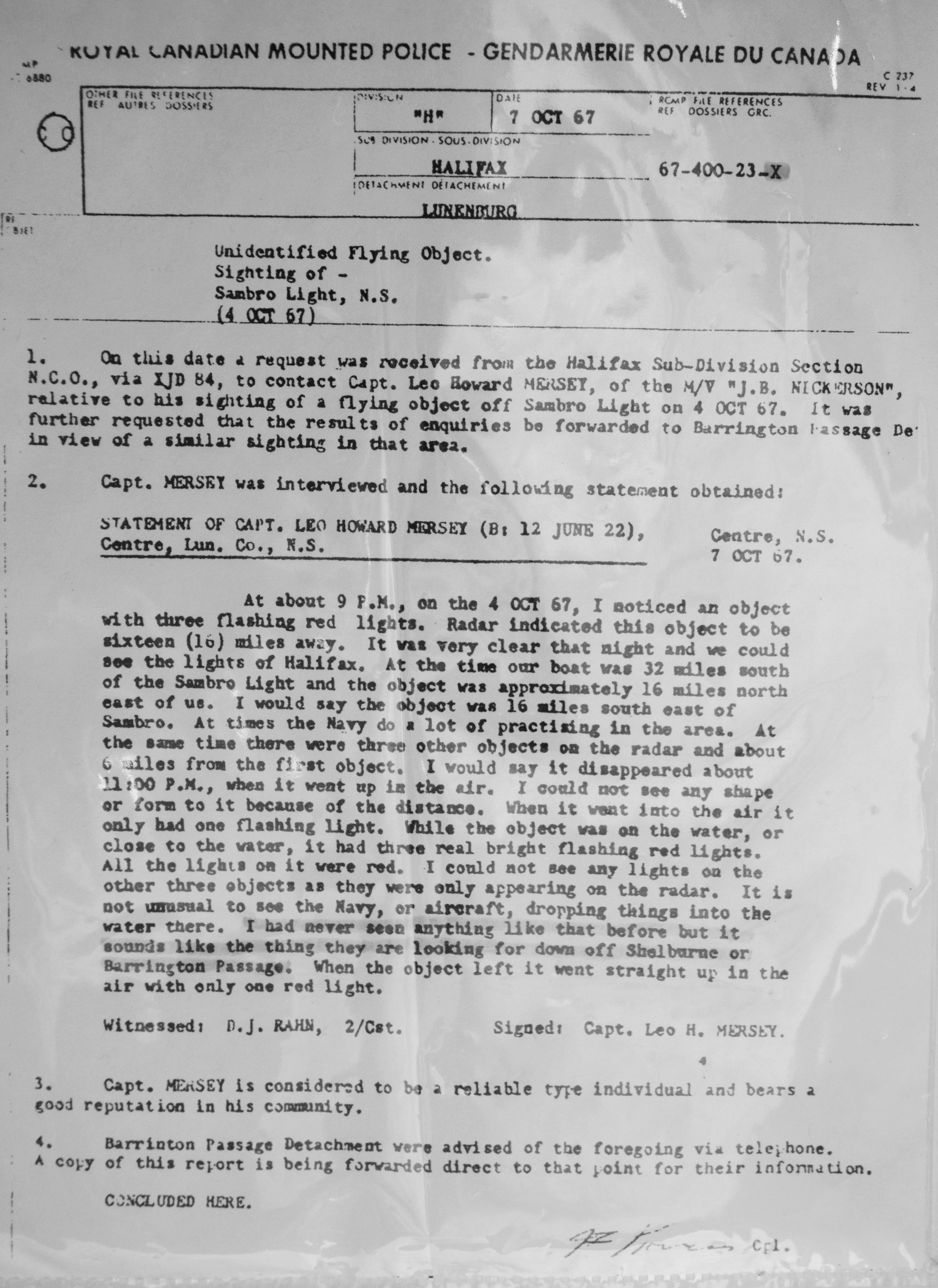
RCMP 67-400-23-X

While standing at the wheelhouse of his vessel, Captain Leo Howard Mersey was looking at four blips on his Decca radar that were stationary. When he looked up about 28 kilometres (17 mi) from the vessel's windows, he could see the four bright objects situated in a roughly rectangular formation. The entire crew of nearly twenty fishermen stood on deck and watched the object in the northeastern sky. Mersey radioed the rescue coordination centre and the harbour master in Halifax asking for an explanation and filed a report with the Lunenburg RCMP outlining his sighting when they returned to port.

=== Halifax Harbour sightings ===
The Chronicle-Herald and local radio stations reported a glowing object that was observed by various witnesses who called into their newsrooms. They described strange glowing objects flying around Halifax at around 10:00 pm.

== Initial events ==
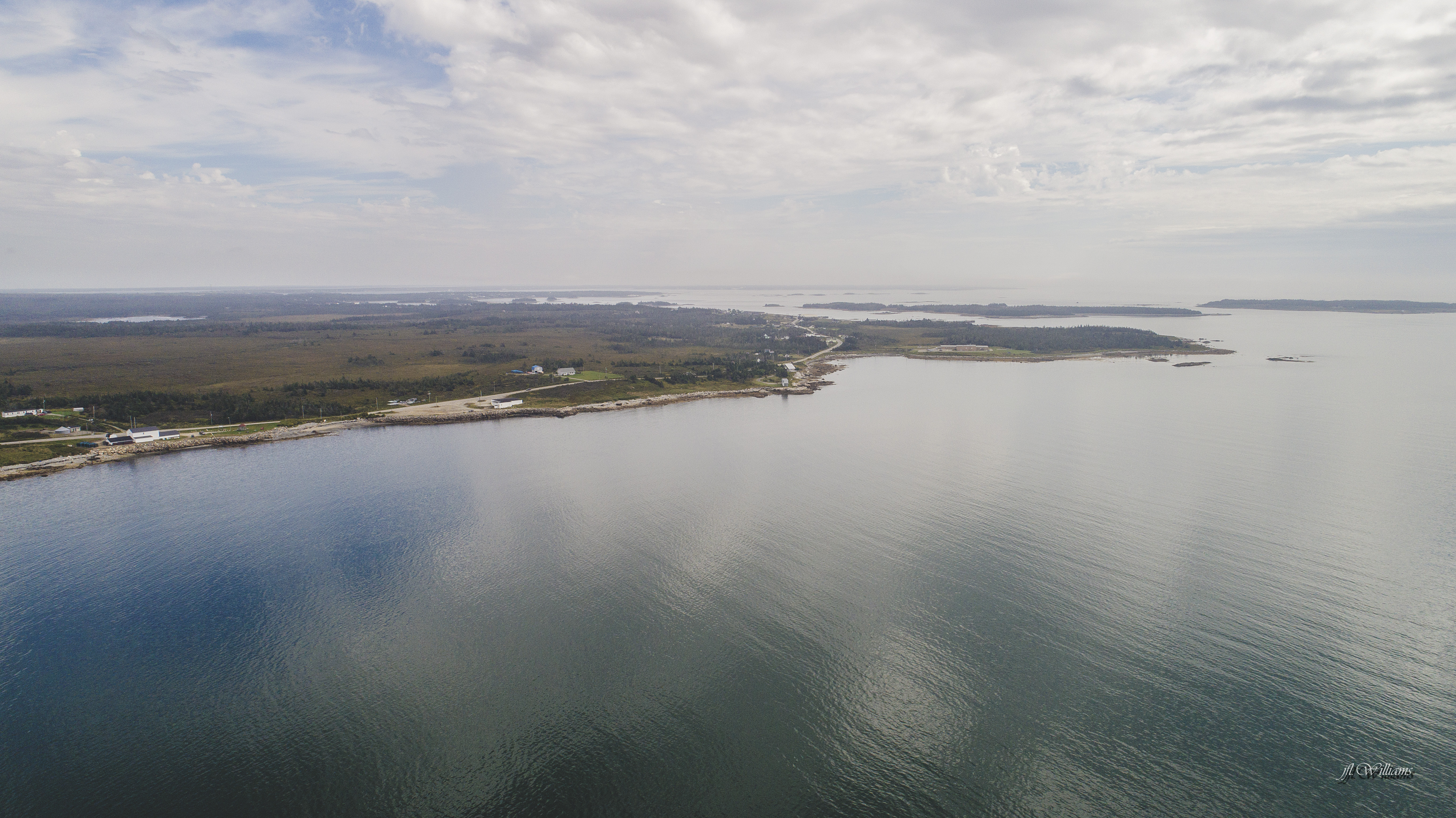
Aerial view of the location of the Shag Harbour incident

On the night of 4 October 1967, at about 11:20 pm Atlantic Daylight Time, it was reported that something had crashed into the waters of Shag Harbour. At least eleven people saw a low-flying lit object head towards the harbour. Multiple witnesses reported hearing a whistling sound "like a bomb," then a "whoosh," and finally a loud bang. The object was never officially identified, and was therefore referred to as an unidentified flying object (UFO) in Government of Canada documents. The Canadian military became involved in a subsequent rescue/recovery effort. The initial report was made by local resident Laurie Wickens and four of his friends. Driving through Shag Harbour, on Highway 3, they spotted a large object descending into the waters off the harbour. Attaining a better vantage point, Wickens and his friends saw an object floating 250 to 300 m (820 to 980 ft) offshore in the waters of Shag Harbour. Wickens contacted the RCMP detachment in Barrington Passage and reported he had seen a large airplane or small airliner crash into the waters off Shag Harbour.

== Search and rescue efforts ==
Within about 15 minutes, two RCMP officers arrived at the scene, having assumed an aircraft had crashed. Concerned for survivors, the RCMP detachment contacted the Rescue Coordination Centre (RCC) in Halifax to advise them of the situation and ask if any aircraft were missing. Before any attempt at rescue could be made, the flying object, with lights still showing, started to sink and disappeared from view. A rescue mission was quickly assembled. Within half an hour of the crash, local fishing boats went out to the crash site in the waters of the Gulf of Maine off Shag Harbour to look for survivors. No survivors, bodies, or debris were taken, either by the fishermen or by a Canadian Coast Guard search and rescue cutter, which arrived about an hour later from nearby Clark's Harbour.

By the next morning, RCC Halifax had determined that no aircraft were missing. While still tasked with the search, the captain of the Canadian Coast Guard cutter received a radio message from RCC Halifax indicating that all commercial, private and military aircraft were accounted for along the eastern seaboard, in both the Atlantic provinces and New England.

The same morning, RCC Halifax also sent a priority telex to the "Air Desk" at the Royal Canadian Air Force headquarters in Ottawa, which handled all civilian and military UFO sightings, informing them of the crash and that all conventional explanations such as aircraft, flares, etc. had been dismissed. Therefore, this was labelled a "UFO Report". The head of the Air Desk then sent another priority telex to the Royal Canadian Navy headquarters concerning the "UFO Report" and recommended an underwater search be mounted. The Navy, in turn, sent another priority telex tasking Fleet Diving Unit Atlantic with carrying out the search.

Two days after the incident had been observed, a detachment of Navy divers from Fleet Diving Unit Atlantic was assembled and for the next three days they combed the seafloor of the Gulf of Maine off Shag Harbour looking for an object. The final report said no trace of an object had been found.

== Documents ==
There is a summary of the event from the Department of National Defence files located at the national Library and Archives.

== Press coverage ==
The Shag Harbour reports received extensive front page coverage in The Chronicle-Herald. The paper ran a headline story on 7 October titled, "Could Be Something Concrete in Shag Harbour UFO – RCAF." The article, by Ray MacLeod, included witness descriptions of an alleged object and crash, the Air Force's search and rescue effort, and the Navy's underwater search that was underway, including three additional divers from Fleet Diving Unit Atlantic.

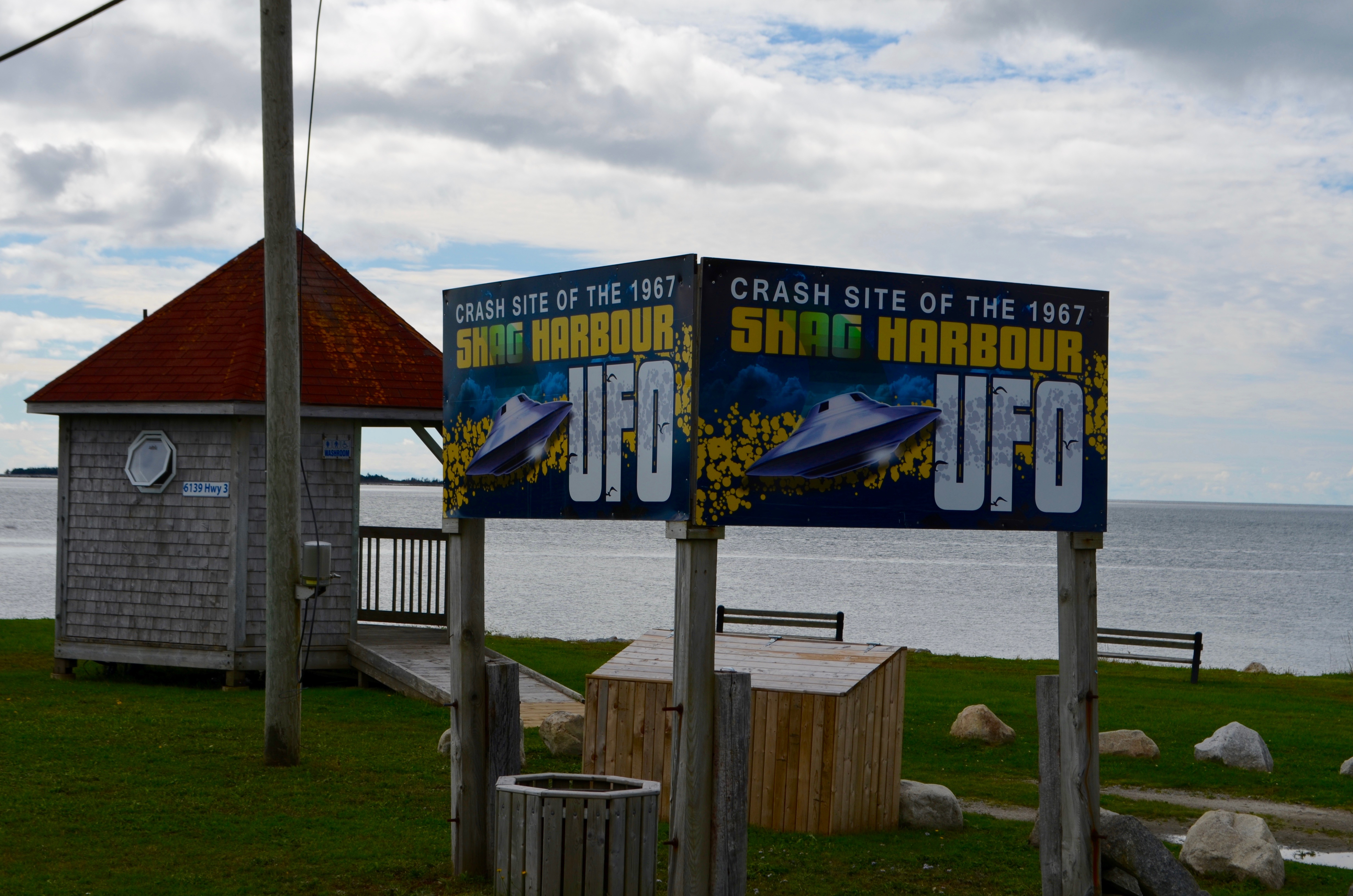
The above themed lookout area is one example of how the local region has memorialized the event, while the Shag Harbour UFO Centre (not pictured) is another such example.

The head of the Air Force's "Air Desk" in Ottawa, Squadron Leader Bain, who recommended the Navy undertake an underwater search, was also quoted, saying the Air Force was "very interested" in the matter. "We get hundreds of reports every week, but the Shag Harbour incident is one of the few where we may get something concrete on it.”

The article also mentioned UFO reports that immediately preceded the incident, including the above-mentioned one from a woman in Halifax around 10:00 pm.

The Chronicle-Herald ran another story on 9 October titled "UFO Search Called Off," stating that the Navy had ended "an intensive undersea search for the mysterious unidentified flying object that disappeared into the ocean here Wednesday night." As to what was found, the Navy stated, "Not a trace... not a clue... not a bit of anything." The story of the search being called off for an alleged "mysterious dark object" was also carried by The Canadian Press in other newspapers.

== See also ==
- List of UFO sightings
- UFO sightings in Canada
