= Andrew Cole (musician) =

Musician and philanthropist

Andrew James Cole is a Canadian-born musician and philanthropist from the UK. He is signed to Crier Records. Cole is also recognized for his anti-abuse awareness multimedia project entitled "#NoJoke"

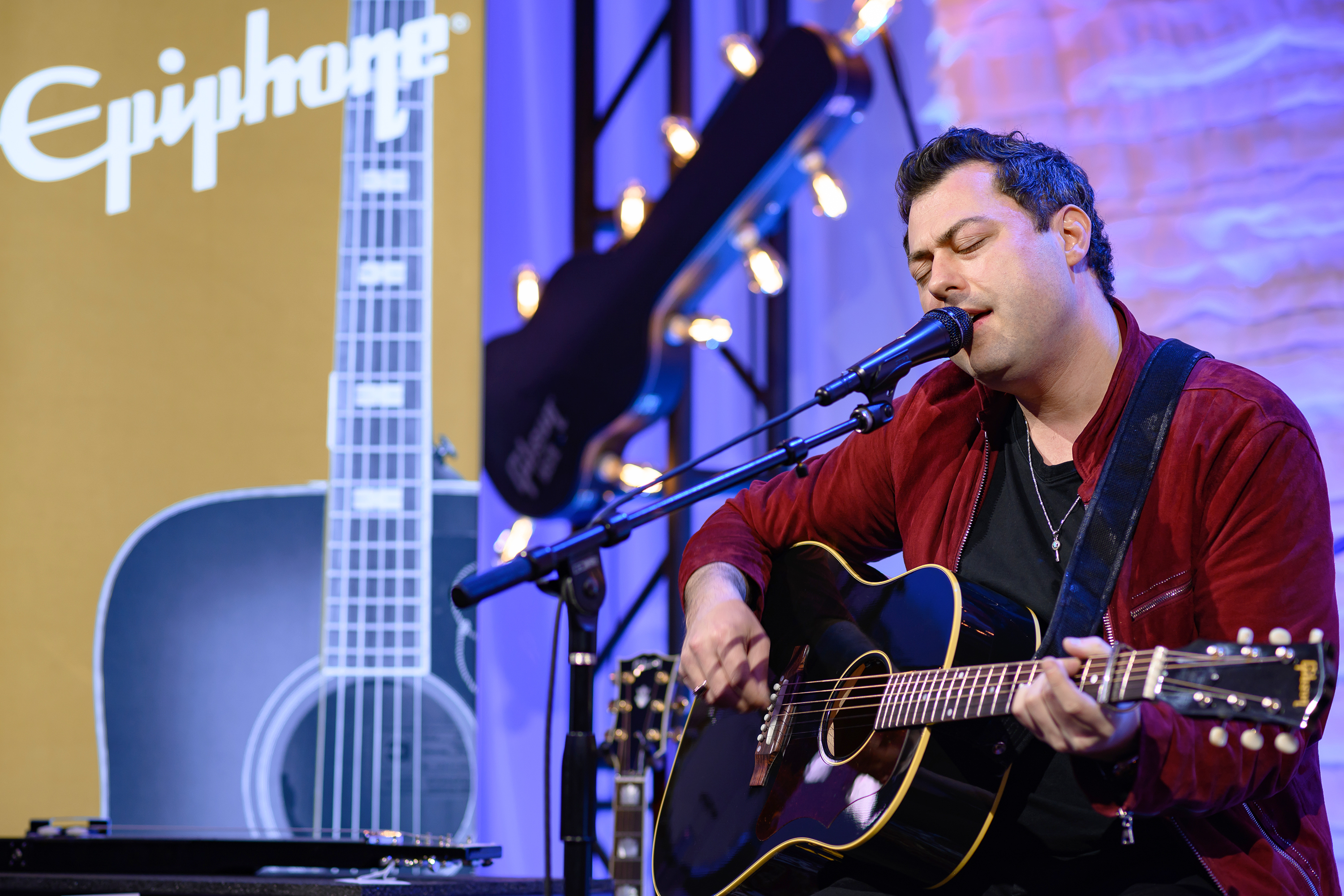

== Early life ==
Cole was born in Toronto in Ontario, Canada. When Cole was six months old, he moved to Liverpool, England. Cole's father was a trucker and his mother was a nurse. He spent much of his youth bouncing back and forth from the UK and Canada.

== Musical career ==
Cole released his first album in June 2010 entitled "Why We Wonder" under his own label Crier Records, which featured Tom Cochrane and Kathleen Edwards.

In 2012, Cole released a two-song EP entitled "Voices" including two singles "Voices at 4am" and "Psycho Cabaret." The EP features a number of artists including Tom Cochrane ("Life Is A Highway:), Kenny Aronoff (The Smashing Pumpkins and Elton John), Alex Lifeson (RUSH), Chris Cheney, and Kenny Greer. The album was self-produced by Cole through Crier records and mixed by Chris Potter and Ian Cooper of Sphere and Metropolis Studios.

On July 23, 2014, Sony Music Entertainment Canada released "Glenn Morrison - Colourblind (feat. Andrew Cole)" in Canada. On September 20, 2014, the single entered the charts at 88 the first week of entering the Canadian Hot 100. As of October 25, 2014, "Glenn Morrison - Colourblind (feat. Andrew Cole)" reached the 25th slot.

== Performances ==
Cole has performed as an opening act for a number of well-known artists including Elton John, John Fogerty, and Tom Jones,

== #NoJoke ==
Cole's anti-bullying documentary, which has been in the making since 2012, is a collaborative song/film featuring celebrities and musicians including Jeff Goldblum, Ozzy Osbourne, Slash, Meatloaf, Carrot Top, Sharon Osbourne, Lights and Dave Stewart. As of January 2014, film producer Adam Leipzig became attached to the project to aid in creating the vision for the film.
