= Murder of Jennifer Teague =

2005 murder in Ottawa, Canada

Jennifer Teague
- Born: June 30, 1987; Ottawa, Ontario, Canada
- Died: September 8, 2005 (aged 18); Ottawa, Ontario, Canada
- Cause of death: Strangulation
- Body discovered: September 18, 2005

Jennifer Teague (June 30, 1987 – September 8, 2005) was a teenager living in Ottawa, Ontario, Canada who was murdered during the early morning hours of September 8, 2005.

== Murder ==
In the early morning of September 8, 2005, after finishing her shift at Wendy's, Teague met up with some friends at a Mac’s Convenience Store in Barrhaven. It was when she started walking home on Jockvale Road that she disappeared. An extensive search was conducted by many local residents across much of the Barrhaven area and the disappearance made headlines across Canada. On September 18, Teague's body was discovered by an off-duty police officer, dumped near a parking lot leading to the Lime Kiln Trail in Ottawa's Greenbelt.

On June 9, 2006, Kevin Davis, a 24-year-old pizza maker, stripped naked and rushed out onto Fallowfield Road screaming "I killed Jennifer Teague!" several times. It was later discovered that he was high on magic mushrooms at the time. He was taken to an Ottawa-area hospital where he recanted, claiming that it was his altered mental state that made him claim to have killed Teague. He was released from hospital shortly thereafter. However, on June 26, Davis approached an off-duty police officer and confessed to murdering Teague. The officer then called Ottawa Police who later arrested Davis without incident.

== Trial of Kevin Davis ==
On January 12, 2008, the same day that murderer Chris Myers pleaded guilty, Kevin Davis had announced his intentions on pleading guilty to murder charges at the start of his trial which was scheduled for January 25, 2008.

In court, Davis revealed that, in the week leading up to Teague's murder, he had been planning on raping and killing a young woman, even going so far as making a "kit" containing a knife, rope and a gag. He said he wanted a younger victim because she would be easier to control. Finding Teague in the early morning hours was a completely random opportunity. Davis brought Teague to his home where he lived with his mother. He found himself unable to commit his planned rape and strangled her to death before disposing of her body just before dawn. It was described in the statement that Davis’ hatred towards women in general driven by recent romantic rejections played an important role in the reason behind the murder, as well as general misanthropy stemming from events like being fired from his job at Home Depot and the death of his pet cat.

In the trial, it was revealed that Davis thought that he deserved his punishment of life in prison. He revealed that if he could, he would give up his life in order to bring back the life of the young teenage girl. Teague's father Ed said he did not see any sincerity in the statement made by Davis. However, Teague's mother Jean had said that she was relieved by the guilty plea because it meant that the family and friends of Teague did not have to go through the hardships of a lengthy trial.

Davis was sentenced to life in prison with no chance of parole for at least 25 years.

== Aftermath ==
Teague's killing thrust the Barrhaven community into a state of shock. In the 10 months between Teague's murder and Davis's arrest, residents explained how they lived in fear knowing that one of their neighbours could have killed Teague. Several individuals living in the Barrhaven area told news channels that they did not let their loved ones walk home alone during the night. Barrhaven councillor Jan Harder made a statement saying that the community should learn from the experience. "People will look at their next-door neighbours, hopefully, look at people that they aren't aware of on a daily basis, and maybe pay more attention".

In 2015, Teague's father and stepmother Sylvie wrote a book entitled Behind the Darkest Hours: Where Hope Lies about how to cope with similar tragedies. Sylvie Teague has worked on proposing a bill of victims' rights that would entitle the families of murder victims to counselling and up-to-date information from police officers. With the help of Victims of Violence, a charity providing support to victims of violent crimes as well as support to their families, the Teagues have also pushed for the elimination of the faint hope clause, a bill repealed in 2011 that allowed murderers to pursue early parole after 15 years in prison.

The Teague case was featured on the CBC crime series The Detectives on September 20, 2018.

== See also ==
- List of solved missing person cases (2000s)
- Murder of Ardeth Wood, a murder which was often compared to the Jennifer Teague case
