= Asking for Flowers =

Studio album by Kathleen Edwards
- Released: March 4, 2008
- Genres: Country, rock, pop
- Length: 49:11
- Labels: MapleMusic Recordings (CDA); Zoë Records (US)
- Producers: Kathleen Edwards, Jim Scott

Kathleen Edwards chronology
Back to Me (2005)	Asking for Flowers (2008)	Voyageur (2012)

Professional ratings
Review scores
Source	Rating
AllMusic	4/5 stars
Robert Christgau	(2-star Honorable Mention)
The Music Box	4/5 stars
Pitchfork	7.9/10
Rolling Stone	4/5 stars

Asking for Flowers is the third studio album by Canadian singer-songwriter Kathleen Edwards. The album was released March 4, 2008, and was well received by critics, similarly to her first two albums released under Zoë Records, Failer and Back to Me. The Canadian Press said of the album's track list, "unlike your average floral arrangement, there's not a dud in the bunch." The Boston Globe reported that the album had similarities to Edwards' 2005 album Back to Me, but showed maturity as a singer and songwriter.

The album contains many references to figures in the Canadian media, including murder victim Alicia Ross, and controversial former hockey player Marty McSorley.

The album peaked at number 102 on the Billboard 200 and in the number one spot on the Top Heatseekers chart, and was a nominee for the 2008 Polaris Music Prize.

== Track listing ==
All songs written by Kathleen Edwards.

1. "Buffalo" – 5:15
2. "The Cheapest Key" – 2:42
3. "Asking for Flowers" – 5:02
4. "Alicia Ross" – 5:06
5. "I Make the Dough, You Get the Glory" – 4:37
6. "Oil Man's War" – 4:01
7. "Sure as Shit" – 4:09
8. "Run" – 3:43
9. "Oh Canada" – 3:59
10. "Scared at Night" – 4:09
11. "Goodnight, California" – 6:28
12. "Lazy Eye" – 3:29 / "I Can't Give You Up" – 2:32 / "Asking for Flowers" (exclusive version) – 4:48 (All three cuts were online bonus tracks available through various outlets.)

== Personnel ==
- Paul Bryan – bass
- Jim Bryson – piano, backing vocals
- Burke Carroll – pedal steel guitar
- Gary Craig – drums, percussion
- Colin Cripps – electric guitar, 12 string guitar
- Margaret Edwards – backing vocals
- Kevin Fox – cello
- John Ginty – Hammond organ
- Bob Glaub – bass
- Don Heffington – drums, percussion
- Greg Leisz – electric guitar, pedal steel guitar
- Anne Lindsay – violin
- Johann Lotter – viola
- Bob Packwood – piano
- Paul Reddick – harmonica
- Justin Rutledge – backing vocals
- Jim Scott – omnichord
- Sebastian Steinberg – bass
- Benmont Tench – piano
- Kathleen Edwards – vocals, acoustic guitar, electric guitar, violin, vibraphone

== Charts ==
Chart performance
Chart (2008)	Peak position
Canadian Albums (Billboard)	15
Dutch Alternative Albums (Alternative Top 30)	9
UK Country Albums (Official Charts)	2
US Billboard 200	102
US Heatseekers Albums (Billboard)	1
US Top Tastemaker Albums (Billboard)	14
