= Total Freedom =

Studio album by Kathleen Edwards
- Released: August 14, 2020
- Recorded: 2019–2020
- Genre: Alt-country
- Length: 38:36
- Label: Dualtone
- Producers: Jim Bryson; Ian Fitchuk; Kathleen Edwards

Kathleen Edwards chronology
Voyageur (2012)	Total Freedom (2020)	Billionaire (2025)

Total Freedom is the fifth studio album by Canadian singer-songwriter Kathleen Edwards. It was released by Dualtone Records on August 14, 2020.

== Background and recording ==
In 2014, two years after the success of her album Voyageur, Edwards decided to quit music and open a coffee shop in Stittsville called Quitters. Edwards returned to music in 2017 after Maren Morris invited her to write a song for her album, Girl. As a result, Edwards began writing and recording songs for her own album. The album was recorded at studios in Stittsville, Nashville, and Kingston. The album was produced by Edwards alongside co-producers Jim Bryson and Ian Fitchuk.

== Critical reception ==
Professional ratings
Aggregate scores
Source	Rating
AnyDecentMusic?	7.4/10
Metacritic	80/100
Review scores
Source	Rating
AllMusic	4/5 stars
American Songwriter	3/5 stars
Exclaim!	7/10
Financial Times	4/5 stars
Paste	8/10
Pitchfork	7.8/10
PopMatters	8/10 stars
Uncut	8/10

Total Freedom received positive reviews from music critics, who lauded the album as a fitting return for Edwards. At Metacritic, which assigns a normalized rating out of 100 to reviews from mainstream publications, the album received an average score of 80, based on eight reviews, indicating "generally favorable reviews" from reviews.

Steve Horowitz of PopMatters praised the album, writing "the songs are lyrically delightful and melodically charming ... Edwards' delightfully delivers her insights, even the unpleasant ones." Writing for AllMusic, Mark Deming opined, "However long she decides to keep writing and singing her songs, we can only be grateful for the tough, heartfelt beauty she's chosen to share."

In a more critical review of the album, Hal Horowitz of American Songwriter wrote that "her singing remains strong and she is emoting about issues close to her, these tracks would benefit from more musical muscle." However, Horowitz later noted "even if Total Freedom isn’t her finest work, it’s encouraging that Edwards has returned to releasing new material and doing what she does best."

== Track listing ==
All tracks are written by Kathleen Edwards.

Total Freedom track listing
No.	Title	Length
1.	"Glenfern"	4:30
2.	"Hard on Everyone"	5:33
3.	"Birds on a Feeder"	3:14
4.	"Simple Math"	4:15
5.	"Options Open"	3:48
6.	"Feelings Fade"	3:21
7.	"Fools Ride"	3:30
8.	"Ashes to Ashes"	4:05
9.	"Who Rescued Who"	2:23
10.	"Take It with You When You Go"	3:57
Total length:		38:36

== Personnel ==
- Kathleen Edwards – vocals, acoustic and electric guitars
- Peter Von Althen – drums, percussion
- Darcy Yates – bass guitar
- Gord Tough – electric and slide guitar
- Jim Bryson – acoustic, electric, and slide guitars, organ, piano, banjo, percussion, string machine, effects, synthesizer, backing vocals

=== Additional musicians ===
- Blair Hogan – electric guitar (track 1)
- Jill Andrews – backing vocals (tracks 1 and 6)
- Aaron Goldstein – pedal steel (tracks 2, 4 and 6)
- Todd Lombardo – nylon string guitar (track 3), acoustic guitar (tracks 5, 8 and 10), banjo (track 8)
- Ian Fitchuk – bass guitar (tracks 3 and 5), book kick/percussion (track 3), Wurlitzer (track 4), and piano (tracks 8 and 10)
- Daniel Tashian – backing vocal and guitar (track 5)
- Kinley Dowling – violin, viola and string arrangement (track 6)
- Phillipe Charbonneau – bass guitar (track 7)
- Jon Hynes – bass guitar (tracks 8 and 10)
- Courtney Marie Andrews – backing vocals (track 8)

=== Technical personnel ===
- Jim Bryson and Kathleen Edwards – producers (tracks 1, 2, 4, 6, 7 and 9)
- Ian Fitchuk and Kathleen Edwards – producers (tracks 2, 5, 8 and 10)
- Jim Bryson, Ian Fitchuk and Kathleen Edwards – producers (track 3)
- Craig Alvin, Zack Pancoast, Zane Whitfield, Jim Bryson, Dylan Lodge and Konrad Snyder – engineers
- Konrad Snyder – mixing
- Greg Calbi – mastering

== Charts ==
Chart performance for Total Freedom
Chart (2020)	Peak position
Canadian Albums (Billboard)	24
US Billboard 200	183
