= UFO sightings in Canada =

List of alleged UFO signtings in the nation of Canada

Below is a partial list of alleged sightings of unidentified flying objects or UFOs in Canada.

According to a memo written by the Department of National Defence, sightings of unidentified flying objects in Canada occurred throughout the first half of the twentieth century. However, the Canadian government did not take interest in collecting information on sightings until 1947.

== 1951, Gander, Newfoundland ==
On 10 February 1951, a U.S. Navy aircraft flying to Iceland from Gander reported a near-collision with a large, orange, circular UFO that “almost literally flew circles around" the American aircraft.

== 1960, Clan Lake, Northwest Territories ==
On 18 June 1960, a prospector told the Yellowknife RCMP detachment that a month earlier, he and his partner saw a UFO at Clan Lake, located 30 miles (48 km) north of Yellowknife. According to ufologist Chris Rutkowski, the men claimed they saw a hovering object 4–6 feet (1.2–1.8 m) wide that hit the surface of the lake. The RCMP investigated, but found nothing.

== 1967, Falcon Lake, Manitoba ==
Stefan Michalak claimed he was burned by one of two flying saucers with which he reportedly came into contact on 19 May 1967, near Falcon Lake, Manitoba. Ufologists claim that images of Michalak in the hospital show a grid of burn marks on his chest, and a similar grid appears burned into his T-shirt. They also consider it to be one of the most documented UFO stories in Canada.

Two books have been written on the alleged Falcon Lake occurrence:

- (2017). Stan Michalak, Chris Rutkowski. When They Appeared: Falcon Lake 1967: The inside story of a close encounter. ISBN 9781772800951
- (2015). George Dudding. The Falcon Lake UFO Encounter. ISBN 978-1514246825

Skeptic Aaron Sakulich reviewed the report made by Michalak to police shortly after the incident, along with other evidence, and concluded that Michalak was indeed burned, but that the burns were likely caused by an accident brought on by alcohol consumption, and that Michalak, who was prospecting for silver ore near the lake at the time, probably made the story up to keep other prospectors out of the area.

In April 2018, the Royal Canadian Mint released a $20 silver coin depicting the alleged event as the first of its Canada's Unexplained Phenomena series, stating: "According to Stefan Michalak’s account, two glowing objects descended from the sky on 20 May 1967, near Falcon Lake, Manitoba, where one landed close enough for him to approach. When the craft suddenly took flight, its emission set Michalak’s clothes ablaze, leaving him with mysterious burns… and an unusual tale to tell."

== 1967, Shag Harbour, Nova Scotia ==
In October 1967, an unidentified flying object purportedly crashed in Shag Harbour, Nova Scotia. On 1 October 2019, the Royal Canadian Mint released a $20 silver glow-in-the-dark coin depicting the sighting as the second of its Canada Unexplained Phenomena series.

== 1969, Prince George, British Columbia ==
In Prince George, British Columbia, three unrelated witnesses reported a strange, round object in the late-afternoon sky on 1 January 1969. The sphere radiated a yellow-orange light and appeared to ascend from 2,000 to 10,000 feet (610 to 3,050 m).

== 1974, Langenburg, Saskatchewan ==
Around 10:30 a.m. on 1 September 1974, a farmer named Edwin Fuhr in the area of Langenburg, Saskatchewan, claimed to have seen five saucer-shaped objects hovering approximately one foot off the ground near a slough. Believing it to be a prank, Fuhr walked closer and noticed the saucers were also rotating at a high speed.

When his swather would not restart, Fuhr sat for 15 minutes watching the objects before they took off, too scared to move. He described takeoff as being extremely fast, with no noise. The objects did not emit anything besides a grey vapor.

An RCMP report found five circles, matching Fuhr's description of the objects. No physical evidence in the area indicated someone had driven in and made the circles.

In 2024, the Royal Canadian Mint commemorated the event with a special silver coin.

== 1975–1976, Southern Manitoba ==
In Southern Manitoba in 1975 and 1976, several sightings were reported of a red, glowing UFO that was sometimes described as "mischievous" or "playful". The UFO was nicknamed "Charlie Redstar" by the public.

== 1978, Clarenville, Newfoundland and Labrador ==
In the early morning of 26 October 1978, a single sighting of a UFO by twelve individuals occurred in Clarenville, Newfoundland and Labrador, near Random Island. The object was reportedly oval-shaped with a fin on its tail. Individuals who spotted the object called the Royal Canadian Mounted Police, and the dispatched officer, Constable James Blackwood, witnessed the UFO hover 100 feet (30 m) above the water for around one or two hours before vanishing. Blackwood used a telescope specialized for drug surveillance to observe the UFO, and other eyewitnesses used binoculars. According to Blackwood, whenever he would shine his headlights, the object would react by shining its headlights back. Reportedly Blackwood was attempting to contact the pilots of the craft. It left no evidence of its appearance apart from eyewitness testimony of the event.

In 2016, a separate sighting occurred wherein a resident of Clarenville spotted lights hovering over the waters between their town and Random Island.

In 2020, the sighting was depicted on a $20 silver glow-in-the-dark coin as the third of the Canada's Unexplained Phenomena series by the Royal Canadian Mint.

== 1989, Campbellton, New Brunswick ==
In November 1989, two sisters living in Campbellton, New Brunswick, witnessed three triangular UFOs hovering just over Sugarloaf Mountain. The aircraft were all silent, with each one eventually rapidly pulling backwards and then even more quickly shooting forward into the night sky in succession.

== 1990, Montreal, Quebec ==
On 7 November 1990, in Montreal, Quebec, witnesses reported a round, metallic object about 540 metres (1,770 ft) wide over the rooftop pool of the Bonaventure Hotel. Eyewitnesses saw 8 to 10 lights forming into a circle above them, emitting bright white rays. The phenomenon lasted three hours, from 7:20 to 10:20 p.m., and moved slowly northwards. While none could identify the lights, a few witnesses, according to the next day's report in La Presse, were ready to express their belief that they were visited by aliens.

A few of the witnesses discussed their sighting in a televised interview on the CBC.

The sighting was commemorated in 2021 on a $20 silver glow-in-the-dark coin as the fourth installment of the Canada's Unexplained Phenomena series by the Royal Canadian Mint.

== 1997, Trail, BC ==
At least two women who reportedly did not know each other were standing on the bridge over the Columbia River, waiting for the Canada Day fireworks show, when they witnessed three small lights above them quickly take off down the river, just a foot or two above the water, zig-zagging along the watercourse heading eastbound until they flew out of sight. It was still daylight and the fireworks show had not yet begun.

== 2010, Harbour Mille, Newfoundland and Labrador ==
During the night of 25 January 2010, there were multiple UFO reports in Harbour Mille, Newfoundland and Labrador. Royal Canadian Mounted Police initially stated the reports were due to a missile launch, but later retracted the statement, and the Office of the Prime Minister stated that the UFOs were not missiles. Due to Harbour Mille's proximity to Saint Pierre and Miquelon, residents suspected French military activity, an assumption which was dismissed by an official statement from the French Government confirming there was no military activity taking place during the reported incident. The RCMP referred to the event as an unexplained sighting, and NORAD stated there was no known rocket launch at the time. The event prompted MP Gerry Byrne to press the government for further information regarding the incident, and he issued a political criticism against the then-Conservative government for what he deemed a lack of transparency.

== 2014, Kensington, Prince Edward Island ==
While putting out a bonfire late in the evening of 4 June 2014, John Sheppard witnessed unusual lights in the sky over the Gulf of St. Lawrence and captured 22 minutes of it on his cellphone. After MUFON investigated their report and agreed that it was a confirmed sighting, the CBC covered the event. The next day, the CBC released a follow-up article in which a series of alternate explanations for the event were presented.

== 2014, North York, Ontario ==
Between 7:00 p.m. and 10:00 p.m. on Saturday, 26 July 2014, there were multiple UFO sighting reports in North York, Ontario. At around 9:00 p.m. on Saturday, 26 July 2014, Sarah Chun witnessed a string of six or seven diagonal, flashing lights in the sky from the window near her dining table in her condominium in North York before going outside to her balcony to observe. She observed the flashing lights for about 25 minutes and recorded two videos on her iPad, which were later posted on her YouTube channel. Toronto Police's 32 Division reported receiving several calls on the unidentified flying objects between 7:00 p.m. and 10:00 p.m. that night. Several police officers witnessed the lights, and a Toronto police officer who saw one of the lights speculated that it was a quadcopter launched from a building, but did not investigate while he was on bike patrol. The event was witnessed by many people, including Roxanna Maleki, a local musician, who had exited a movie theatre due to a fire alarm and who had posted a video to her Facebook account. Sebastian Setien, a resident of North York, reported that he was entertaining guests while barbecuing on his balcony and took a photo at 4:18 p.m. He and his guests came back out later at around 8:40 p.m. and saw the lights, but he lost all internet connection while recording the video on his phone. It was also reported that there were some minor power outages in Toronto, including at the subway station in North York, and at the Cineplex movie theatre, which briefly tripped the fire alarm. Further photographs and a video from another location in North York were also reported. Several prosaic explanations were proposed, such as a quadcopter, Chinese lanterns, and kites with LED lights.

== Canadian UFO Survey results ==
According to the 2002 Canadian UFO Survey published by Ufology Research of Manitoba, the city of Toronto had the largest number of sightings with 34, followed by Vancouver with 31, and Terrace, B.C., with 25 reports. In 2002, a typical UFO sighting lasted approximately 15 minutes.

The Canadian Federal Government (as of 2007) directs all UFO sightings to Chris Rutkowski of Ufology Research of Manitoba.

On 15 July 2018, a Canadian news site mentioned a new study conducted by Ufology Research, formerly known as Ufology Research of Manitoba, stating there were more than 1,000 UFO sightings reported in Canada in 2017.

== See also ==
- Dan Aykroyd
- Stanton T. Friedman
- Paul Hellyer
- Peter Millman
- List of ufologists
- List of reported UFO sightings
- Falcon Lake incident
- Shag Harbour incident
- Project Magnet (Canada)
- Project Second Storey
