= The Occasionals =

Studio album by Jim Bryson
- Released: 2000
- Recorded: Sound of One Hand Studios, Ottawa
- Genre: Folk; Indie rock
- Length: 35:37
- Producer: Bill Stunt

Jim Bryson chronology
The Occasionals (2000)	The North Side Benches (2003)

Professional ratings
Review scores
Source	Rating
AllMusic	4/5 stars

The Occasionals is the debut solo album by Canadian singer-songwriter Jim Bryson, released in 2000.

== Track listing ==
All songs written by Jim Bryson, except as noted

1. Without Piano
2. Travelled by Land
3. 26 Miles by Car
4. February
5. Satellite
6. Impaler
7. Lately
8. Soupy Sayles
9. One Cigarette
