= Punchbuggy (band) =

Canadian pop punk band

- Origin: Ottawa, Ontario, Canada
- Genres: Alternative rock, pop punk, power pop
- Years active: 1994–2001
- Labels: Shake the Record Label; Sony; Warner; Restless; BMG
- Past members: Andrew Kieran; Daren hore; Adam Luedicke; Ian Macdonald; Jim Bryson; Frank Viciana; Bryan Curry

Punchbuggy (formed in 1994) in Ottawa, Ontario, was a Canadian pop punk band. The band released four full-length albums. Their song "Lucky Me, Lucky You" appeared in the Tom Green movie Freddy Got Fingered.

== History ==
Punchbuggy was formed in Ottawa, Ontario, Canada, in 1994 and is composed of Andrew Kieran (vocals, guitar), Jim Bryson (guitar, vocals), Darren Hore (vocals, bass), and Adam Luedickie (drums). Founding members Kieran, Hore, and Luedicke previously performed together in the band Uncommon Society in Elliot Lake, Ontario.

In 1997, Bryson left the band to pursue a solo career and was replaced by Bryan Curry.

Punchbuggy's musical style has been categorized as pop punk and power pop.

In September 1999, the band won the 'Born on the WWW' contest, sponsored by MusicDirect and IUMA. As part of the award, they performed at a webcast ceremony in California that featured The Offspring and No Doubt. The track "Cletus" from their 1996 album, Grand Opening Going Out of Business Sale, is featured on the PlayStation title Road Rash: Jailbreak, and "Smash It Up" appears in the Roy Scheider film Silver Wolf.

== Discography ==
=== Studio albums ===
- 1994: All Nite Christian Rollerskate
- 1996: Grand Opening Going Out of Business Sale
- 1998: My Norwegian Cousin
- 2002: The Great Divide

=== EPs ===
- Dressed for Success 7" MagWheel Records
- Punchbuggy/Treble Charger Split 7"” Rightwide

=== Compilations ===
- On Guard For Thee Compilation-AU GO GO Australia
- Ottawa City Speedway Compilation CARGO Records
- "Ripchordz As Fuck" Compilation ENGUARD Records
- "No Driver’s Side Airbag" Snowboard video
- "POP CAN ” Compilation Alert Records
- "On the Road" Raw Energy/A+M Compilation

== Members ==
- Andrew Kieran – vocals, guitar (1994–2001)
- Daren hore – bass, vocals (1994–2001)
- Adam Luedicke – drums, vocals (1994–2001)
- Ian Macdonald – keyboards, vocals (1994–2001)
- Jim Bryson – guitar (1994–1997)
- Bryan Curry – guitar, vocals (1997)
- Frank Viciana – guitar, vocals (1997–2001)
- Nick Belanger – bass (1994)
