= Murder of Ardeth Wood =

Murdered Canadian student

Ardeth Wood
- Born: Ardeth Mary Margaret Wood; October 28, 1975; Saint John, New Brunswick, Canada
- Died: August 6, 2003 (aged 27); Ottawa, Ontario, Canada
- Cause of death: Forcible drowning
- Body discovered: August 11, 2003

Ardeth Mary Margaret Wood (October 28, 1975 – August 6, 2003) was a Canadian graduate student who was killed in a forcible drowning in Ottawa. The initial search for Wood was one of the largest search efforts in the city's history, and the two-year search for her killer was one of the largest manhunts in Canada.

== Biography ==
Ardeth Wood was the first daughter born to Brenden Wood and Catherine Ashley on October 28, 1975, in Saint John, New Brunswick. Wood spent most of her life in Ottawa, where she graduated from Lester B. Pearson Catholic High School in 1994 and studied philosophy and history at Carleton University. After earning a B.A. in 1999 and an M.A. in 2001, she began pursuing a PhD in philosophy at the University of Waterloo. There, Wood was recognized as an exceptional student and was co-editor of Eidos: The Canadian Graduate Journal of Philosophy.

== Murder ==
In the summer of 2003, Wood was on leave from her doctoral studies and was visiting her family in Ottawa. She was last seen on August 6 riding her bicycle on a path along the Sir George Ettiene Parkway in the city's east end. News of her disappearance was reported widely in Canada, and the entire city of Ottawa rallied around a search effort that involved the police, the military and hundreds of volunteers. Her body was found in the woods around Green's Creek on August 11. Her clothes were never found and no foreign DNA was found on her body. Ottawa police received many tips that a man on a bicycle was seen luring women into the woods along the path where Wood was last seen. A composite sketch of the murder suspect was compiled soon thereafter, and was widely distributed across Canada.

On October 20, 2005, police arrested 25-year-old Chris Myers near Renfrew. Myers had been previously charged with assaults in Ottawa and North Bay. Staff Sgt. Randy Wisker led the investigation into Wood's murder, and relied on a loose collection of tips prior to the arrest.

On January 8, 2008, Myers pleaded guilty to Ardeth Wood's murder as well as five unrelated assaults. He was sentenced to life in prison with no chance of parole for ten years. Myers was denied parole in 2020.

== Aftermath ==
Carleton University and University of Waterloo both established scholarships in Wood's name. A 109-year-old Bebb's oak tree in Ottawa's Dominion Arboretum was dedicated to Wood in 2007. The tree was split in half by a violent windstorm on September 27, 2017.

Wood's murder case was featured in a 2010 episode of Murder She Solved entitled "The Pathway Predator".

== See also ==
- List of solved missing person cases (2000s)
