= The Falcon Lake Incident =

Studio album by Jim Bryson
- Released: October 19, 2010
- Recorded: February 2010
- Genre: Folk; indie rock
- Label: Kelp; MapleMusic

Jim Bryson chronology
Live at the First Baptist Church (2008)	The Falcon Lake Incident (2010)	Somewhere We Will Find Our Place (2016)

The Falcon Lake Incident is the fourth studio album by Canadian singer-songwriter Jim Bryson, released October 19, 2010, on Kelp Records and MapleMusic. The album was recorded with The Weakerthans, at a cottage on Falcon Lake in Manitoba. Other guest musicians on the album include Gord Sinclair (of The Tragically Hip) and Jill Barber.

== Track listing ==
1. "Raised All Wrong"
2. "Metal Girls"
3. "Fell Off the Dock"
4. "Wild Folk"
5. "Constellation"
6. "Freeways in the Frontyard"
7. "Up All Night"
8. "Kissing Cousins"
9. "Decidedly"
10. "Anything and All"
