= Building 55 =

EP by Kathleen Edwards
- Released: 1999
- Genre: Alt-country
- Label: independent

Kathleen Edwards chronology
| Building 55 (1999) | Failer (2002) |

Building 55 is an EP released in 1999 by Canadian singer-songwriter Kathleen Edwards. Only 500 copies of the EP were printed, and it became a highly sought-after collector's item after her commercial breakthrough with her full-length debut album Failer.

Edwards has stated that she gave away just as many copies of the album while on tour as she sold.

== Track listing ==
1. "Injustica" – 5:11
2. "Nagasaki" – 4:34
3. "5 Years" – 6:06
4. "Bigstar" – 4:04
5. "Wordgamething" – 4:29
6. "Violin for Mom" – 0:39
7. "Titled Untitled" – 5:00
