= Billionaire (album) =

Studio album by Kathleen Edwards
- Released: August 22, 2025
- Studio: Sound Emporium; Smilo
- Genre: Americana
- Length: 41:01
- Label: Dualtone
- Producer: Jason Isbell; Gena Johnson

Kathleen Edwards chronology
Total Freedom (2020)	Billionaire (2025)

Professional ratings
Aggregate scores
Source	Rating
Metacritic	78/100
Review scores
Source	Rating
Pitchfork	6.8/10
NEXT Magazine	5/5 stars
Americana Highways	—
PopMatters	7/10

Billionaire is the sixth studio album by the Canadian singer-songwriter Kathleen Edwards. It was released on August 22, 2025, by Dualtone Records. The album was co-produced by Jason Isbell and Gena Johnson.

== Background ==
In a press release related to the announcement of Billionaire, Edwards stated that she named the album as such because she felt that people were using the term "billionaire" in what she described as "a caustic way", further adding: "But we should all want to be billionaires in life, to be rich in experience, friendship, purpose, and the pursuit of the things that bring us joy."

== Promotion ==
The album's double lead singles, "Save Your Soul", and "Say Goodbye, Tell No One", were released on June 3, 2025. The second single, "Pine", was released on July 3, 2025. The final singles, "When the Truth Comes Out" and "Little Red Ranger", were released on July 30, 2025.

== Critical reception ==
Writing for Pitchfork, Amanda Wicks rated the album 6.8 out of 10, and opined that Billionare "[felt] more lived in" in contrast to Edwards' previous album Total Freedom. Felix Hughes of NEXT Magazine Canada wrote in his review of the album that it was a "triumphant" return to music for Edwards that is "full of confidence and brutally honest reflections on the world around us."

== Track listing ==
All tracks are written by Kathleen Edwards, except "When the Truth Comes Out" (written with Ken Yates) and "Billionaire" (written with Dan Wilson).

Billionaire track listing
No.	Title	Length
1.	"Save Your Soul"	3:32
2.	"Say Goodbye, Tell No One"	6:12
3.	"Little Red Ranger"	3:44
4.	"When the Truth Comes Out"	3:30
5.	"Billionaire"	4:10
6.	"Need a Ride"	6:34
7.	"Little Pink Door"	3:43
8.	"FLA"	3:16
9.	"Other People's Bands"	2:38
10.	"Pine"	3:42
Total length:		41:01

== Personnel ==
Credits adapted from the album's liner notes.

- Kathleen Edwards – lead vocals (all tracks), acoustic guitar (tracks 1–3, 7, 9), background vocals (1, 10), electric guitar (2, 4–6, 9, 10), claps (9)
- Jason Isbell – production (all tracks), electric guitar (1, 2, 4–10), keyboards (1), synthesizer (2, 5), background vocals (2), acoustic guitar (3, 5, 8)
- Gena Johnson – production, engineering, mixing (all tracks); background vocals (5, 8), piano (5), claps (9)
- Joanna Finley – engineering assistance
- Pete Lyman – mastering
- Daniel Bacigalupi – mastering assistance
- Chad Gamble – drums (1–6, 8–10), percussion (1–4, 10)
- Anna Butterss – bass (1, 2, 5, 6, 9, 10)
- Jen Gunderman – piano (2, 3, 7), celeste (2), Hammond B3 organ (3, 4, 6, 8, 10), Wurlitzer organ (4), claps (9)
- Shelby Lynne – background vocals (2, 4, 9)
- Allison Moorer – background vocals (2, 4, 9)
- Annie Clements – bass (3, 4, 8), claps (9)
- Matt Sucich – background vocals (3, 8)
- Rob Moose – violin, viola, string arrangement, string engineering (5)
- Corrina Grant Gill – background vocals (5)
- Dave Brown – claps (9)
- Riley McKenna Simonds – photography
- Joey Luscinski – album design
