= Livezey House =

Glen Fern
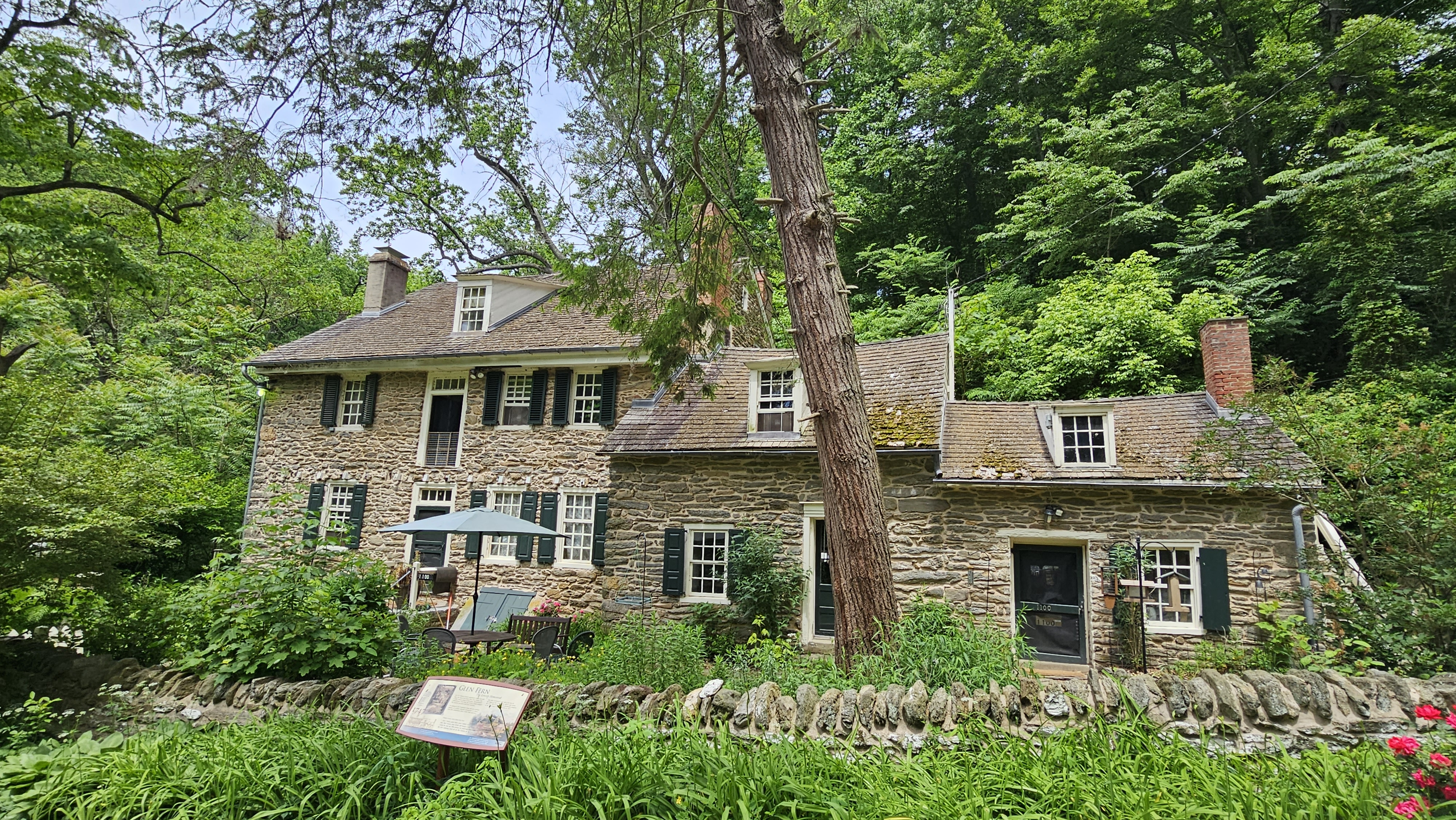
- The house in 2023
- Interactive map of Glen Fern
- Location: Philadelphia, PA
- Coordinates: 40°02′58″N 75°12′48″W
- Area: Wissahickon Park
- Built: c.1725
- Architect: Thomas Shoemaker
- Owner: Thomas Livezey & family

Philadelphia Register of Historic Places
- Designated: June 26, 1956

The Livezey House, also known as Glen Fern, is a historic house and mill on the east side of Wissahickon Creek in Philadelphia, Pennsylvania. It was designated on the Philadelphia Register of Historic Places on June 26, 1956.

The house was constructed (c.1725) by Thomas Shoemaker and sold to Thomas Livezey Jr. (1723–1790) on October 10, 1747, who constructed a mill at the site. The following year, on April 2, Livezey married Martha Knowles. They were devout Quakers and raised a large family of 5 sons and 5 daughters in that tradition at Glen Fern, some of whom inherited the management of the mill. Livezey's descendants occupied Glen Fern for more than 120 years.

== Grounds and structures ==
In 1873, the Livezey House and property was purchased by the City of Philadelphia for Fairmount Park and operations of the mill ceased. In 2020, the house continues to be a private residence, and many ruined structures from the days of the mill are scattered around the grounds. The house consists of "three adjoining gable-roof structures in diminishing order, each with a single shed-roof dormer in its roof." Livezey expanded the house in 1764, and constructed several other buildings including a barn in 1768.

The Livezey dam crosses the Wissahickon Creek and is visible in a historic ambrotype photograph taken in 1858. The dam is still extant but the stone outhouse was removed, presumably during the late 19th century.

== Revolutionary tales ==
Several stories from the Revolution have been passed down, though of uncertain authenticity. Officers of the British and Continental forces purportedly met on neutral grounds at the Livezey House, and another story claims that eleven Hessian soldiers were killed along the stone wall in front of the house.

According to an entry in Elizabeth Drinker's journal, the Livezey mill caught fire on October 24, 1793, and was burned to the ground. Six hundred barrels of flour, and five hundred bushels of wheat, were lost in the fire.

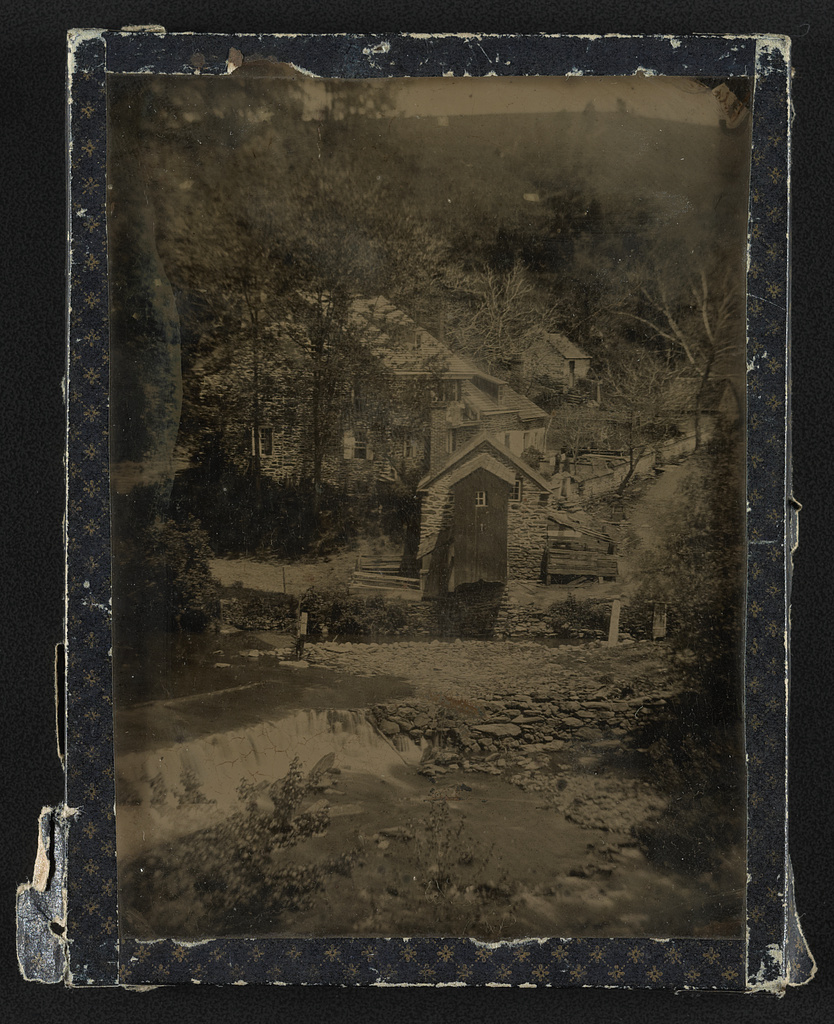
Historic ambrotype photograph of Glen Fern taken on June 2, 1858.
