= Back to Me (Kathleen Edwards album) =

Studio album by Kathleen Edwards
- Released: March 1, 2005
- Genre: Country
- Length: 48:43
- Labels: MapleMusic (Canada); Zoë (U.S.)
- Producers: Colin Cripps; Pierre Marchand

Kathleen Edwards chronology
| Failer (2002) | Back to Me (2005) | Asking for Flowers (2008) |

Professional ratings
Review scores
| Source | Rating |
|---|---|
| AllMusic | link |
| The Music Box | link |
| Rolling Stone | link |
| Pitchfork | (7.7/10) link |

Back to Me is the second studio album by Canadian singer-songwriter Kathleen Edwards. It was released March 1, 2005 on the independent labels MapleMusic in Canada and Zoë Records in the United States.

The album reached #173 on the Billboard 200 and #6 on the Top Heatseekers chart.

== Track listing ==
1. "In State" (Edwards) – 3:56
2. "Back to Me" (Edwards, Colin Cripps) – 3:29
3. "Pink Emerson Radio" (Edwards) – 4:25
4. "Independent Thief" (Edwards) – 4:44
5. "Old Time Sake" (Edwards, Peter Cash) – 4:59
6. "Summerlong" (Edwards, Cripps) – 4:04
7. "What Are You Waiting For?" (Edwards) – 4:43
8. "Away" (Edwards) – 3:31
9. "Somewhere Else" (Jim Bryson) – 3:47
10. "Copied Keys" (Edwards) – 5:06
11. "Good Things" (Edwards) – 5:51

== Personnel ==
- Kathleen Edwards – electric, acoustic guitars, banjo, strings
- Kevin McCarragher – bass
- Joel Anderson – drums
- Colin Cripps – electric guitars, slide, hammertone, tambourine
- Benmont Tench – organ, piano
- Richard Bell – accordion
- Peter von Althen – tambourine
- Craig Durrance – mixing and mastering
- Design: Daniel Lohnes

== Charts ==
Chart performance
| Chart (2005) | Peak position |
|---|---|
| Canadian Albums (Nielsen SoundScan) | 35 |
| Dutch Albums (Album Top 100) | 87 |
| Dutch Alternative Albums (Alternative Top 30) | 9 |
| UK Country Albums (Official Charts) | 1 |
| UK Independent Albums (Official Charts) | 47 |
| US Billboard 200 | 173 |
| US Heatseekers Albums (Billboard) | 6 |
