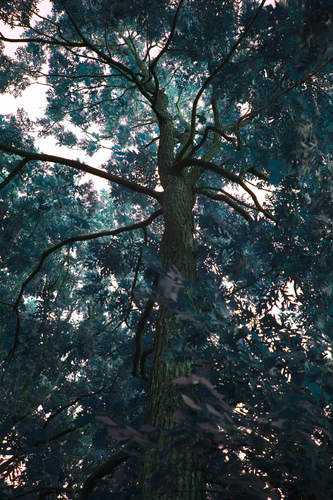

Scientific classification
- Kingdom: Plantae
- Clade: Tracheophytes
- Clade: Angiosperms
- Clade: Eudicots
- Clade: Rosids
- Order: Fagales
- Family: Fagaceae
- Genus: Quercus
- Subgenus: Quercus subg. Quercus
- Section: Quercus sect. Quercus
- Species: Q. × bebbiana

Binomial name
- Quercus × bebbiana C.K.Schneid.

= Quercus × bebbiana =

Hybrid plant

Quercus × bebbiana (or Quercus bebbiana), known as Bebb's oak, is a naturally occurring hybrid of white oak (Quercus alba) and burr oak (Quercus macrocarpa). It occurs where their ranges overlap in the eastern United States and eastern Canada. It was named for Michael Schuck Bebb (1833–1895), an Illinois botanist who specialized in willows (Salix). Its parents are both placed in Quercus sect. Quercus.

A tree reaching 15 m (49 ft), and available from specialty nurseries, its acorns are palatable to humans because of their sweetness.
