= Voyageur (Kathleen Edwards album) =

Studio album by Kathleen Edwards
- Released: January 17, 2012
- Recorded: August 2010 – May 2011
- Genre: Folk, country, rock
- Length: 44:17
- Label: MapleMusic Recordings (CDA); Zoë Records (US)
- Producer: Kathleen Edwards and Justin Vernon

Kathleen Edwards chronology
Asking for Flowers (2008)	Voyageur (2012)	Total Freedom (2020)

Professional ratings
Review scores
Source	Rating
AllMusic	3.5/5 stars
The A.V. Club	B−
Boston Phoenix	3.5/4 stars
Pitchfork	6.4/10
Slant Magazine	3.5/5 stars
Toronto Star	3/4 stars

Voyageur is the fourth studio album by Canadian singer-songwriter Kathleen Edwards, released on January 17, 2012. The album was produced by Edwards and Justin Vernon of Bon Iver. Voyageur reached the 39th position on the US Billboard 200 chart, becoming Edwards' first top 100 and top 40 album in the US, and her first top ten album in Canada, peaking at number two.

In addition to Edwards' regular backing band, guest musicians on the album include Francis and the Lights, Norah Jones, The Good Lovelies, Stornoway, John Roderick, Phil Cook of Megafaun, S. Carey and Afie Jurvanen.

The album was named as a longlisted nominee for the 2012 Polaris Music Prize on June 14, 2012, and later listed as one of the 10 shortlisted nominees for the prize on July 17.

== Track listing ==
All songs written by Kathleen Edwards except as noted.

1. "Empty Threat" – 3:37
2. "Chameleon/Comedian" – 4:41
3. "A Soft Place to Land" (Kathleen Edwards, John Roderick) – 4:25
4. "Change the Sheets" – 4:30
5. "House Full of Empty Rooms" – 3:01
6. "Mint" – 4:52
7. "Sidecar" (Kathleen Edwards, Jim Bryson) – 2:38
8. "Pink Champagne" (Kathleen Edwards, John Roderick) – 5:09
9. "Going to Hell" – 4:18
10. "For the Record" – 7:06

== Charts ==
Chart performance
Chart (2012)	Peak position
Canadian Albums (Billboard)	2
Dutch Alternative Albums (Alternative Top 30)	15
Irish Albums (IRMA)	93
UK Albums (OCC)	122
US Billboard 200	39
US Americana/Folk Albums (Billboard)	3
US Top Rock Albums (Billboard)	11
US Top Tastemaker Albums (Billboard)	4
