= Jim Bryson (musician) =

Canadian singer-songwriter

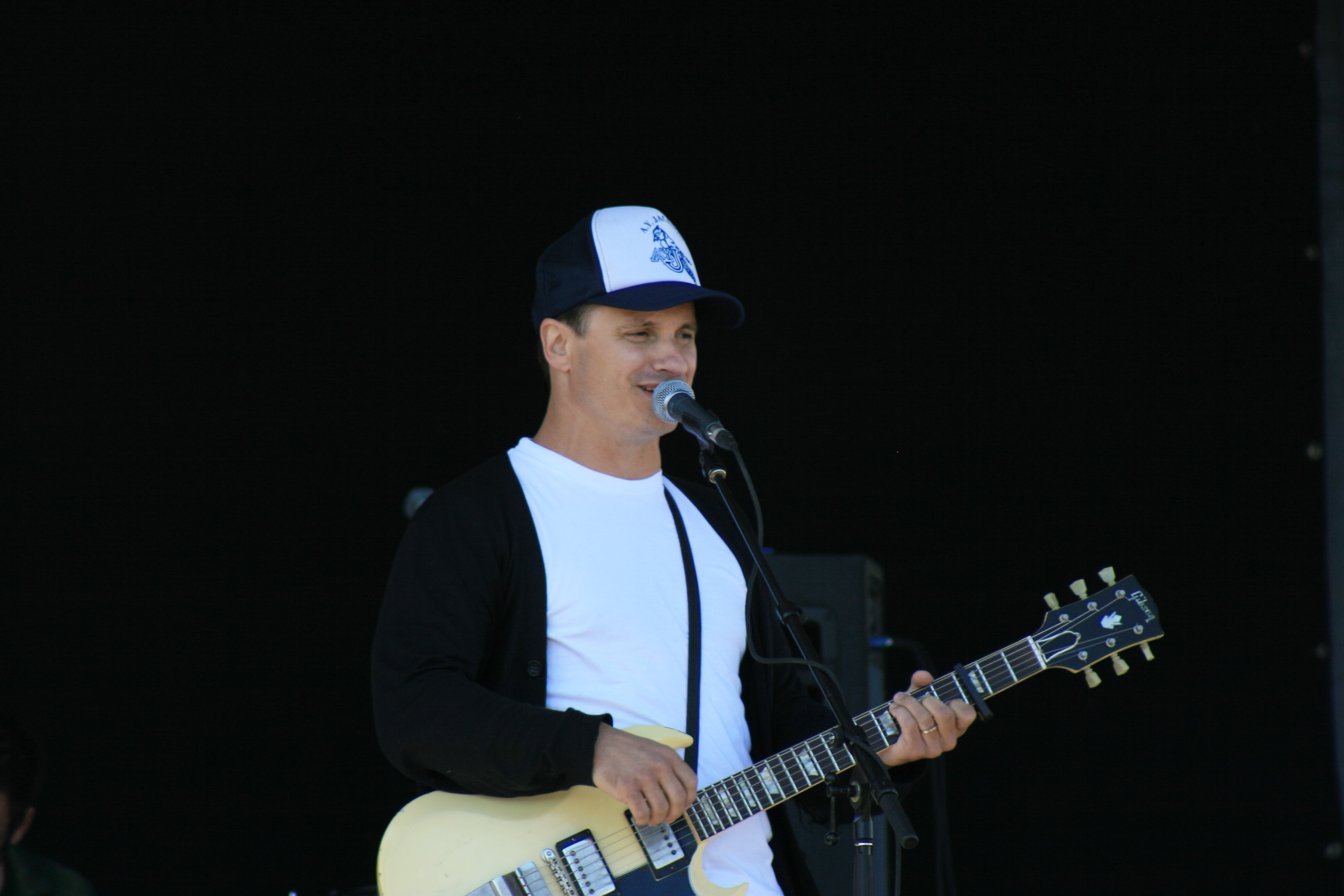
- Jim Bryson, August 2010

Background information
- Born: April 30, 1969 (age 56)
- Origin: Ottawa, Ontario, Canada
- Genres: Alternative country
- Occupations: Musician; songwriter; record producer
- Instruments: Vocals; guitar; banjo; piano
- Years active: 2000–present
- Labels: Kelp; MapleMusic Recordings; Coax Records
- Formerly of: Punchbuggy
- Website: jimbryson.org

James "Jim" Paul Sean Bryson (born April 30, 1969) is a Canadian singer-songwriter. Briefly a founding member of the band Punchbuggy, he moved to a musical life under his own name with the release of his debut album, The Occasionals, in 2000.

A member of singer-songwriter Kathleen Edwards's touring band, Bryson has also toured and recorded with many other artists, including Howe Gelb, Lynn Miles, Sarah Harmer, the Weakerthans, Hilotrons and the Tragically Hip.

Bryson has toured Canada and the United Kingdom extensively. He has played the South by Southwest festival and his music has been in rotation on CBC Radio 3.

He is the subject of Kathleen Edwards's song "I Make the Dough, You Get the Glory", which appears on her album Asking for Flowers.

It was announced in January 2010 that Bryson was recording songs with the Weakerthans for his next album. That album, The Falcon Lake Incident, was released October 19, 2010. He also produced Tanya Davis' 2010 album Clocks and Hearts Keep Going.

In June 2012, he launched a "Catch and Release" series with singer-songwriter Jeremy Fisher, in which the two musicians collaborated on a project to write and release a song in a single day. The first song in the series, "The Age of Asparagus", was released on June 7, 2012. He has also collaborated with Ottawa musician Chris Page; under the band name Owl Mountain Radar, this duo contributed a cover of the Nils' song "Daylight" to the 2011 compilation album Have Not Been the Same – Vol. 1: Too Cool to Live, Too Smart to Die.

Since 2014, Bryson has run the Fixed Hinge recording studio, which was constructed alongside his home. Here, he has done a great deal of production work for other artists.

His newest EP, Tired of Waiting, was released on September 14, 2018.

== Discography ==
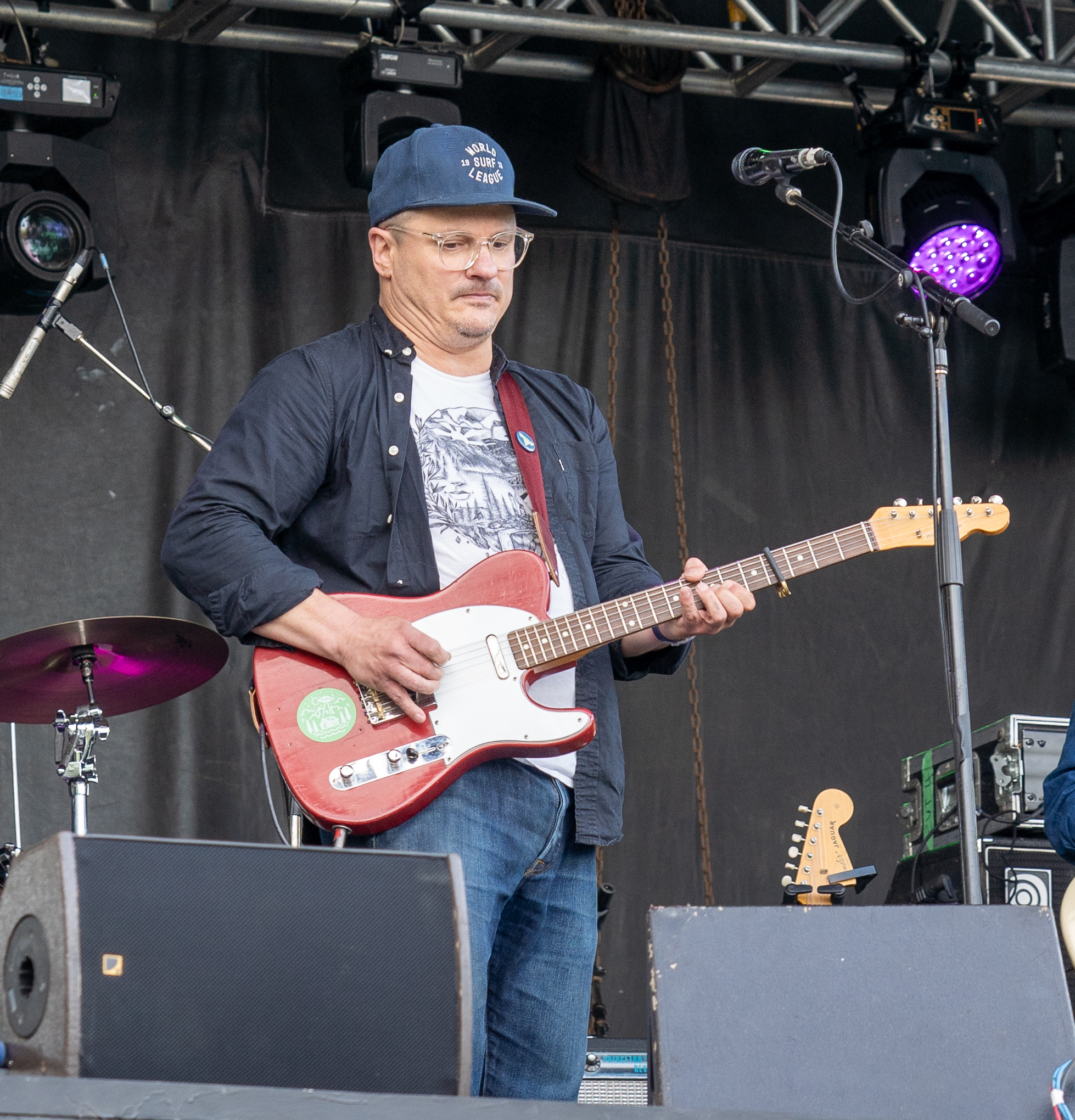
Jim Bryson in 2024

- The Occasionals (2000)
- The North Side Benches (2003)
- Where the Bungalows Roam (2007)
- Live at the First Baptist Church (2008)
- The Falcon Lake Incident (2010)
- Somewhere We Will Find Our Place (2016)
- Tired of Waiting (2018)

=== Contributions ===
- Kathleen Edwards, Failer (2002)
- Kate Maki, Confusion Unlimited (2003)
- Lynn Miles, Unravel (2003)
- Kate Maki, The Sun Will Find Us (2004)
- Sarah Harmer, All of Our Names (2004)
- Kathleen Edwards, Back to Me (2005)
- Howe Gelb, 'Sno Angel Like You (2006)
- Tanya Davis, Clocks and Hearts Keep Going (2010)
- Kathleen Edwards, Voyageur (2012)
- Michael Feuerstack, Singer Songer (2014)
- Oh Susanna, Namedropper (2014)
- Kalle Mattson, Avalanche (2015)
- Ken Yates, Huntsville (2016)
- Larissa Tandy, The Grip (2017)
- Oh Susanna, A Girl in Teen City (2017)
- Kathleen Edwards, Total Freedom (2020)
- Mia Kelly, To Be Clear (2024)
