= Kathleen Edwards =

Canadian singer-songwriter and musician (born 1978)

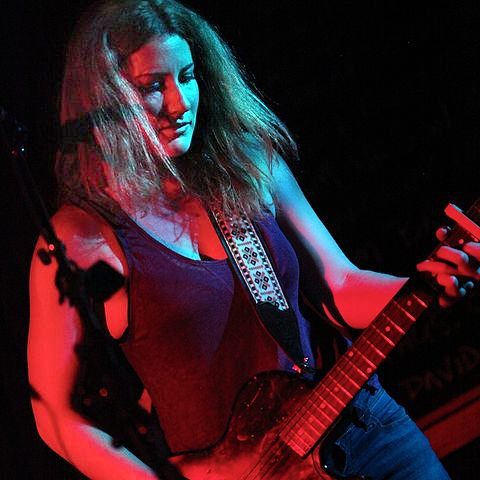
- Edwards at Wakefield, Quebec's Black Sheep Inn, September 1, 2011

Background information
- Born: July 11, 1978 (age 48); Ottawa, Ontario, Canada
- Genres: Alternative country; folk
- Occupations: Musician; songwriter
- Instruments: Guitar; violin; vocals; bass guitar
- Years active: 1999–present
- Labels: Zoë, MapleMusic Recordings, Rounder, Dualtone
- Website: kathleenedwards.com

Kathleen Margaret Edwards (born July 11, 1978) is a Canadian singer-songwriter and musician. Her 2002 debut album, Failer, contained the singles "Six O'Clock News" and "Hockey Skates". Her next two albums – Back to Me and Asking for Flowers – both made the Billboard 200 list and reached the top 10 of Billboard's Top Heatseekers chart. In 2012, Edwards' fourth studio album, Voyageur, became Edwards' first album to crack the top 100 and top 40 in the U.S., peaking at No. 39 on the U.S. Billboard 200 and No. 2 in Canada. In 2012, Edwards' song "A Soft Place To Land" won the SOCAN Songwriting Prize, an annual competition that honours the best song written and released by 'emerging' songwriters over the past year, as voted by the public. Her musical sound has been compared to Suzanne Vega meets Neil Young.

== Early life ==
Edwards, the daughter of a diplomat, spent portions of her youth in Korea and Switzerland. Her father is Leonard Edwards, former Deputy Minister of Foreign Affairs. At age 5, Edwards began classical violin studies that continued for the next 12 years. As a teenager she lived overseas, where she spent much of her time listening to her brother's Neil Young and Bob Dylan records. Her brother also bought her her first record, a Tom Petty album. After high school she decided not to attend post-secondary education, instead opting to play local clubs to pay the bills.

== Music career ==
In 1999, Edwards recorded a six-song EP entitled Building 55 and pressed 500 copies. By the fall of 2000, she was on tour across Canada managing her own gigs. In 2001, she wrote seven of the ten songs for her 2002 debut release Failer.

Edwards played at SXSW in 2002 and was signed to Rounder Records and MapleMusic shortly after. Failer was released in Canada in the fall of 2002 on MapleMusic Recordings. In January 2003 Failer was released by Rounder Records in the US and internationally. Rolling Stone declared her one of year's most promising new acts and Blender said that Failer's songs possessed "an indefinable pull that makes you love the characters they describe, no matter how fucked up they are." The New York Times praised Edwards as a writer whose songs can "pare situations down to a few dozen words while they push country-rock towards its primal impulses of thump and twang." She made her television network debut on the Late Show with David Letterman where she performed "Six O'Clock News."

In 2005, Edwards released Back to Me, which also garnered considerable critical acclaim, and led to the release of the singles "Back to Me" and "In State". The track "Summerlong" was also featured on the soundtrack of the movie Elizabethtown starring Orlando Bloom and Kirsten Dunst.

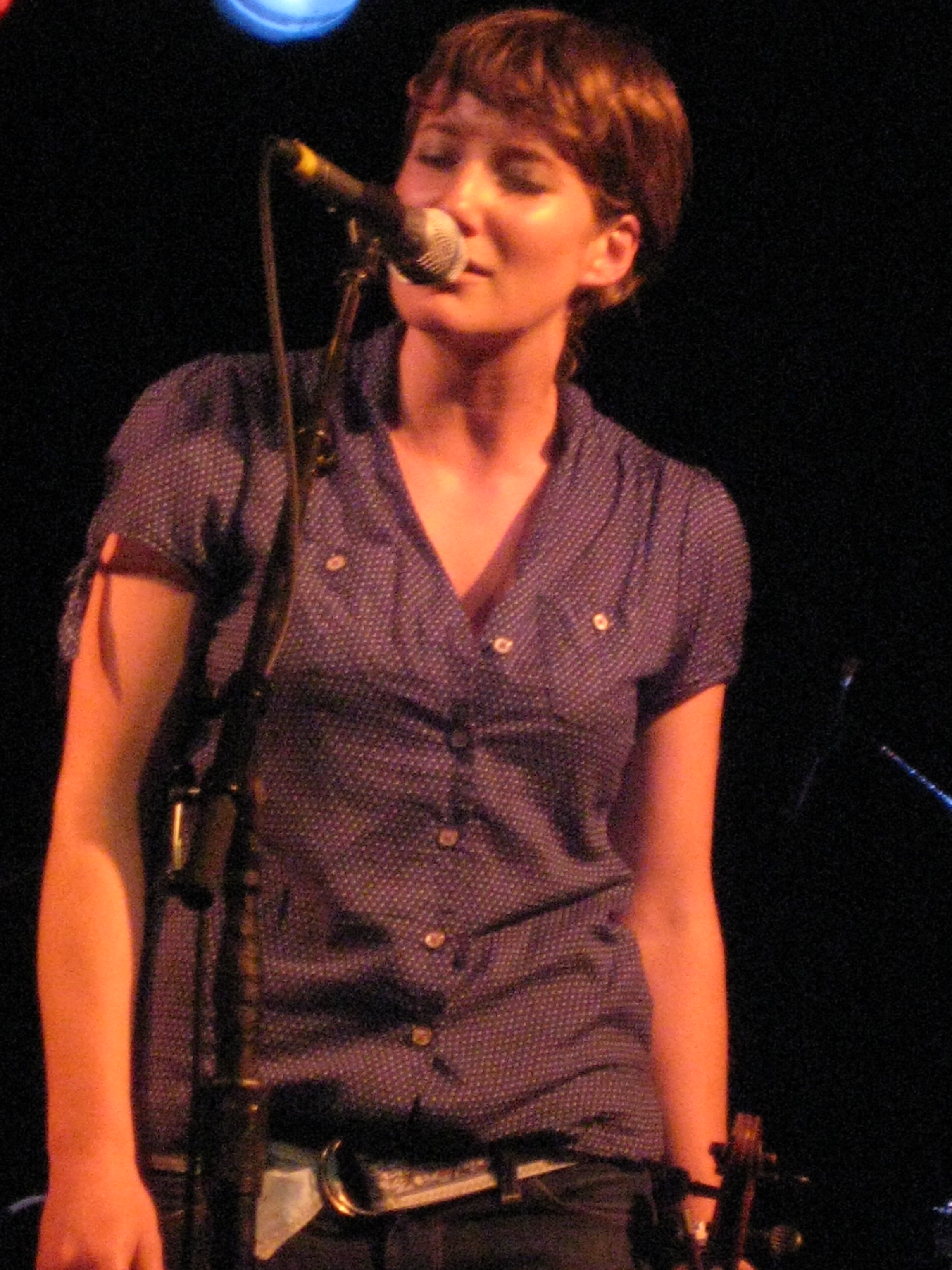
Edwards performing at the 2007 NXNE festival

In 2008, Edwards released her third studio album, Asking for Flowers. It was described by the San Francisco Bay Guardian as "her finest album to date", and was a shortlisted nominee for the 2008 Polaris Music Prize. In contrast with 2005's Back to Me, on which Edwards relied on her working band, Asking for Flowers predominantly features session musicians.

In fall 2010, Edwards began working on her fourth studio album in Wisconsin. Voyageur was released in January 2012. It includes the single "Change the Sheets," and was co-produced by Justin Vernon of Bon Iver.

She appeared on the Late Show with David Letterman on January 17, 2012, singing "Change the Sheets" from her new album Voyageur.

In November 2019, Edwards released "It's Christmastime (Let's Just Survive)", her first new single since Voyageur, on the Dualtone Records compilation album A Dualtone Christmas.

In May 2020, Edwards released the single "Options Open" and announced Total Freedom, her first new album in eight years. The album was released on August 14, 2020.

Edwards announced a new album titled Billionaire on June 3, 2025, which was released on August 22. The album was produced by Jason Isbell and Gena Johnson, and Isbell's 400 Unit band backs up Edwards. The first single from the album, "Save Your Soul", reached number 6 on the Americana Music Association's singles chart.

== Musical collaborations ==
In 2005, Edwards lent her vocals to the duet "The Plan", recorded with Matt Mays and El Torpedo for their self-titled album. In 2006, she was nominated for Juno Awards for Songwriter of the Year and Adult Alternative Album of the Year for Back to Me. In 2007, Edwards worked with John Doe, of the punk rock band X, on his solo album A Year in the Wilderness. She sings on three tracks.

In 2008 Edwards sang backup vocals on Bryan Adams' album 11, and supported one of his tours. In 2009, she joined Adams on stage to sing one of Adams' songs, "Walk on By". In 2011 Edwards contributed vocals on Arkells' song "Agent Zero", off their second album Michigan Left. "Soft Place to Land", one of two songs on Edwards' Voyageur album co-written with The Long Winters frontman John Roderick, won the 2012 SOCAN Echo Songwriting Prize.

She co-wrote the song "Good Woman", from Maren Morris's 2019 album Girl.

== Personal life ==
In 2004, Edwards married guitarist and collaborator Colin Cripps. They divorced in 2011. Edwards was later in a relationship with Justin Vernon, Wisconsin-born singer/songwriter and front-man of the band Bon Iver. Edwards and Vernon separated in 2012. In 2020, Edwards married property developer Sean McAdam. The couple now make their home in St. Petersburg, Florida.

Edwards stepped back from the music scene in 2014, launching a coffee house in Stittsville called Quitters along with Rick Tremblay (who was her manager when she worked in a downtown Starbucks in the 1990s). She insisted that she was not leaving music but just taking a break, and that the name Quitters is "kind of tongue-in-cheek". Quitters closed on March 6, 2022 after Edwards sold the business, so that she could return to her music career.

As of 2018, Edwards continued to perform sporadically, including a number of new songs. In August 2019, following the suicide of American singer-songwriter Neal Casal, Edwards opened up on Twitter about the struggle with depression that led her to take time away from her music career.

== Discography ==
=== Studio albums ===
Title	Details	Peak chart positions							
Title	Details	CAN	IRE	NLD	UK	US	US Heat	US Folk	US Rock
Failer	Release date: September 7, 2002 (Canada) January 14, 2003 (U.S.); Label: MapleMusic; Formats: CD	82	—	—	—	—	—	—	—
Back to Me	Release date: March 1, 2005; Label: MapleMusic; Formats: LP, CD, music download	35	—	87	—	173	6	—	—
Asking for Flowers	Release date: March 4, 2008; Label: MapleMusic; Formats: LP, CD, music download	15	—	—	—	102	1	—	—
Voyageur	Release date: January 17, 2012; Label: MapleMusic; Formats: LP, CD, music download	2	93	—	122	39	—	3	11
Total Freedom	Release date: August 14, 2020; Label: Dualtone; Formats: LP, CD, music download	24	—	—	—	183	—	—	—
Billionaire	Release date: August 22, 2025; Label: Dualtone; Formats: LP, CD, music download	—	—	—	—	—	—	—	—
"—" denotes releases that did not chart

=== Extended plays ===
- 1999: Building 55
- 2003: Live from the Bowery Ballroom
- 2008: Live Session EP (iTunes Exclusive)
- 2022: Dogs and Alcohol
- 2025: Covers EP

=== Singles ===
Year	Single	Peak positions	Album
Year	Single	US AAA	Album
2003	"Six O'Clock News"	15	Failer
2003	"One More Song the Radio Won't Like"	—	Failer
2004	"Hockey Skates"	—	Failer
2005	"Back to Me"	15	Back to Me
2005	"In State"	—	Back to Me
2008	"The Cheapest Key"	—	Asking for Flowers
2008	"I Make the Dough, You Get the Glory"	—	Asking for Flowers
2011	"Change the Sheets"	22	Voyageur
2012	"Wapusk"	—	Non-album single
2013	"It Must Have Been Love"	—	Non-album single
2019	"It's Christmastime (Let's Just Survive)"	—	A Dualtone Christmas
2020	"Options Open"	30	Total Freedom
2020	"Hard On Everyone"	21	Total Freedom
2025	"Save Your Soul"	22	Billionaire
"—" denotes releases that did not chart

=== Guest singles ===
Year	Single	Artist	Album
2006	"Married Again"	Jim Cuddy	The Light That Guides You Home

=== Music videos ===
Year	Video	Director(s)
2003	"Six O'Clock News"	
2003	"One More Song The Radio Won't Like"	
2005	"Back To Me"	Deaton-Flanigen Productions
2005	"In State"	Steven Goldmann
2008	"The Cheapest Key"	Peter Zavadil
2008	"I Make The Dough, You Get The Glory"	Trey Fanjoy
2011	"Change The Sheets	
2013	"Chameleon/Comedian"	

=== Contributed as primary artist ===
- 2003: VA - Cities 97 Sampler: Live from the Cities 97's Studio C - 15th Anniversary (KTCZ) [track 3 - "Six O'Clock News" (live)]
- 2003: VA - City Folk Live VI: More Exclusive, Live Performances from the Studios of WFUV in New York City. (WFUV) [track 7 - "6 O'Clock News" [sic] (live)]
- 2003: VA - Greetings from Area Code: Maine 207 Volume 4 - 98.9 WCLZ (WCLZ) [disc 2, track 8 - "Hockey Skates" (live)]
- 2003: VA - Madison's Progressive Radio: 105.5 Triple M - Live from Studio M Volume 3 (WMMM) [track 12 - "Six O'Clock News" (live)]
- 2003: VA - 92.9 WBOS: Live from the Archives Volume 1 - Studio 7 (WBOS) [track 14 - "Six O'Clock News" (live)]
- 2003: VA - 107.1 KGSR Radio Austin: Broadcasts Vol. 11 (KGSR) [disc 2, track - 6 "Six O'Clock News" (live)]
- 2004: VA - Sweetheart: Love Songs - Our Favorite Artists Cover Their Favorite Love Songs. [track 4 - "A Face in the Crowd" (Tom Petty cover)]
- 2005: VA - Live At The World Cafe XX: V. Twenty - WXPN 88.5 (WXPN) [track 4 - "Back To Me" (live)]
- 2005: VA - 92.9 WBOS: Studio 7 - Live from the Archives 3 (WBOS) [track 14 - "Back to Me" (live)]
- 2005: VA - 102.1 KPRI: Rock Without Rules! - Live Tracks Volume 3 (KPRI) [track 2 - "Back to Me" (live)]
- 2005: VA - 107.1 KGSR Radio Austin: Broadcasts Vol. 13 (KGSR) [disc 2, track 1 - "Back To Me" (live)]
- 2006: VA - 107.1 KGSR Radio Austin: Broadcasts Vol. 14 (KGSR) [disc 1, track 9 - "Unknown Legend" (live) (Neil Young cover)]
- 2007: VA - 91.3 FM KXCI Presents: Live from Studio 2A Volume VII (KXCI) [track 7 - "Back to Me" (live)]
- 2009: VA - FUV Live 12: More Exclusive, Live Performances from the Studios of WFUV in New York City - 90.7 wfuv.org (WFUV) [track 10 - "The Golden State" (live) (with John Doe)]
- 2009: VA - Live & Direct 11: 91.3 FM - WYEP (WYEP) [track 1 - "Asking for Flowers" (live)]
- 2011: VA - National Parks Project: Gwaii Haanas / Wapusk (EP) (FilmCan / Last Gang) [track D2 - "Wapusk - MB" (with Matt Mays & Sam Roberts) & track D5 - "On the Tundra - MB" (with Matt Mays & Sam Roberts)]
- 2012: VA - KINK Live 15 (KINK) [track 3 - "Change the Sheets" (live)]
- 2012: VA - Live at the World Cafe Volume 34: WXPN (WXPN) [track 16 - "Change the Sheets" (live)]
- 2013: VA - The Music Is You: A Tribute to John Denver (ATO) [track 3 - "All Of My Memories"]

=== Appears on ===
- 1999: Wooden Stars - The Moon (Matlock) [track 1 - "Outlaws" & track 2 - "Rebel Radios"]
- 2003: Oh Susanna - Oh Susanna (Nettwerk)
- 2004: Paul Reddick - Villanelle (Northern Blues) [track 3 - "Villanelle"]
- 2004: Liam Titcomb - Liam Titcomb [track 10 - "Rose of Jericho"]
- 2005: Colin Linden - Southern Jumbo [track 10 - Test Song]
- 2005: Matt Mays + El Torpedo - Matt Mays + El Torpedo (Sonic / Warner Music Canada) [track 4 - "The Plan"]
- 2006: Jim Cuddy - The Light That Guides You Home (5 Corners Productions) [track 4 - "Married Again"]
- 2007: John Doe - A Year In The Wilderness (Yep Roc) [track 3 - "The Golden State", track 5 - "A Little More Time" & track 8 - "Lean Out Yr Window"] "The Golden State" also appears on {2008: John Doe - The Golden State (EP) (Yep Roc)} & {2014: John Doe - The Best of John Doe This Far (Yep Roc)}
- 2008: Bryan Adams - 11 [track 7 - "Somethin' to Believe In"]
- 2008: Collin Herring - Past Life Crashing [track 2 - "Beside", track 5 - "Sidekick" & track 9 - "Punches"]
- 2009: Rose Cousins - The Send Off [track 7 - "All the Time It Takes to Wait" & track 9 - "Celebrate"]
- 2009: John Doe and The Sadies - Country Club (Yep Roc) [track 4 - "It Just Dawned on Me" & track 13 - "Are the Good Times Really Over for Good"]
- 2010: Andrew Cole - Why We Wonder [track 2 - "Dead Roses" & track 7 - "Just You Care"]
- 2010: Ladies Of The Canyon - Haunted Woman (Kindling Music) [track 8 - "Poet"]
- 2010: Young Artists for Haiti - "Wavin' Flag" (single)
- 2011: Arkells - Michigan Left (Universal Music Canada) [track 10 - "Agent Zero"]
- 2013: What Made Milwaukee Famous - You Can't Fall Off the Floor (self-released) [track 4 - "Rosewood"]
- 2014: Caitlin Harnett - The River Runs North [track 9 - "Bad Man"]
- 2014: Oh Susanna - Namedropper (Sonic Unyon) [track 4 - "Cottonseed", track 6 - "Mozart for the Cat" & track 10 - "1955"]
- 2016: Jim Bryson - Somewhere We Will Find Our Place (MapleMusic Recordings)

=== DVD ===
- 2004: Return To Sin City: A Tribute To Gram Parsons (Image Entertainment) ["We'll Sweep Out The Ashes In The Morning" (with John Doe) (live)]
- 2004: Toronto Rocks {2 DVD / Canadian Edition} (TGA DVD) ["One More Song the Radio Won't Like" (live), "Mercury" (live) & "6 O'Clock News" (sic) (live)]
- 2004: A Zoe / Rounder Video Compilation: Watch This! (Zoe Vision) ["Six O'Clock News" (music video)]
- 2005: Farm Aid: 20th Anniversary Concert (Image Entertainment) ["Independent Thief" (live)]
- 2010: NPP: National Parks Project (VSC)

=== As composer ===
- 2016: Jack and Amanda Palmer - You Got Me Singing (8 ft. Records) [track 9 - "Pink Emerson Radio"]

=== In TV ===
- 2019: The Order (episode 10) - Netflix

== Awards and nominations ==
Year	Association	Category	Result
2003	Juno Awards of 2003	Roots & Traditional Album of the Year – Solo – Failer	Nominated
2003	Canadian Country Music Association	Roots Artist or Group of the Year	Nominated
2004	Juno Awards of 2004	Songwriter of the Year	Nominated
2004	Canadian Country Music Association	Roots Artist or Group of the Year	Nominated
2005	Canadian Country Music Association	Roots Artist or Group of the Year	Nominated
2006	Juno Awards of 2006	Songwriter of the Year	Nominated
2006	Juno Awards of 2006	Adult Alternative Album of the Year – Back to Me	Nominated
2006	Canadian Country Music Association	Roots Artist or Group of the Year	Nominated
2008	Polaris Music Prize	2008 Polaris Music Prize - Asking for Flowers	Nominated
2009	Juno Awards of 2009	Adult Alternative Album of the Year – Asking for Flowers	Nominated
2012	SOCAN Songwriting Prize	Winning Song – "A Soft Place to Land"	Won
2012	Polaris Music Prize	2012 Polaris Music Prize - Voyageur	Nominated
2013	Juno Awards of 2013	Songwriter of the Year	Nominated
2013	Juno Awards of 2013	Adult Alternative Album of the Year – Voyageur	Nominated
