= Falcon Lake (Manitoba) =

Lake in Manitoba, Canada

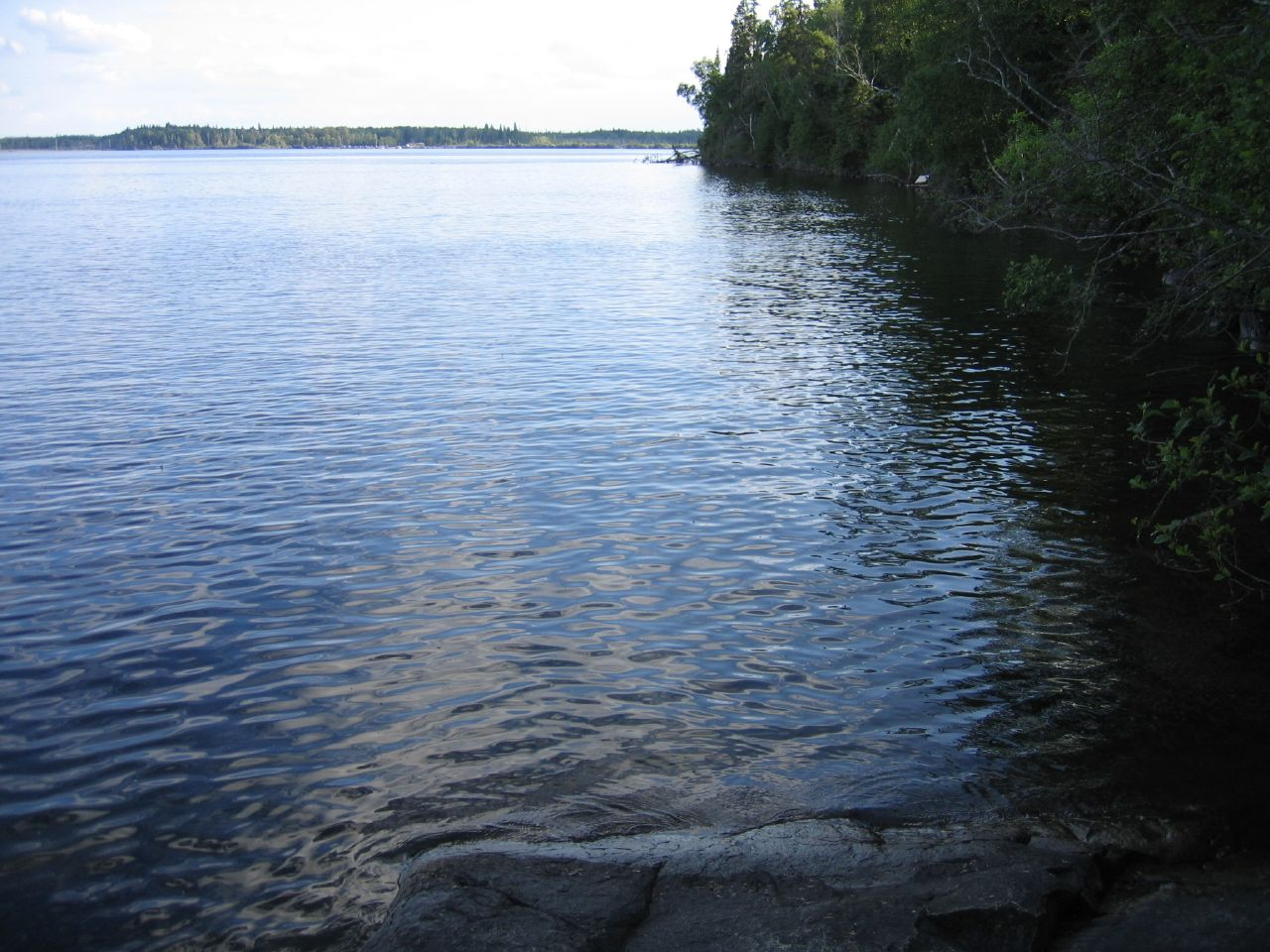
- Falcon Lake

- Location in Manitoba Falcon Lake (Canada)
- Location: Whiteshell Provincial Park, Manitoba, Canada
- Coordinates: 49°42′11″N 95°14′54″W
- Basin countries: Canada
- Islands: five

Falcon Lake is located in the Whiteshell Provincial Park in southeastern Manitoba, Canada. The lake is about 152 kilometres east of Winnipeg on the Trans-Canada Highway near the Ontario border. The lake is named for Métis poet and songwriter Pierre Falcon (1793–1876). It appears on the Palliser map of 1865.

The lake inspired the name of the TV series Falcon Beach although that fictional location is set on another Manitoba lake. The lake was also a favourite summer destination of Neil Young, who wrote a song entitled "Falcon Lake" while with Buffalo Springfield.

== See also ==
- Falcon Lake, Manitoba the community at the western end of the lake
- Falcon Lake Incident, an alleged UFO sighting at the lake
- List of lakes of Manitoba
