= Failer =

Studio album by Kathleen Edwards
- Released: September 7, 2002
- Genre: Alt-country
- Length: 41:05
- Label: MapleMusic Recordings
- Producer: Kathleen Edwards, Dave Draves

Kathleen Edwards chronology
Building 55 (1999)	Failer (2002)	Back to Me (2005)

Failer is the debut full-length studio album by Canadian singer-songwriter Kathleen Edwards, released in 2002. The album was originally released independently in early 2002 before being picked up for wider release by MapleMusic Recordings in September, and subsequently for international release by Zoë Records in January 2003.

The album received a Juno Award nomination for Roots & Traditional Album of the Year – Solo at the Juno Awards of 2003. The following year, Edwards was nominated for Songwriter of the Year at the Juno Awards of 2004, for the songs "Six O'Clock News", "Hockey Skates" and "Mercury".

== Track listing ==
All tracks are written by Kathleen Edwards.

No.	Title	Length
1.	"Six O'Clock News"	4:36
2.	"One More Song the Radio Won't Like"	4:25
3.	"Hockey Skates"	4:28
4.	"The Lone Wolf"	4:55
5.	"12 Bellevue"	3:43
6.	"Mercury"	3:32
7.	"Westby"	2:27
8.	"Maria"	3:46
9.	"National Steel"	4:52
10.	"Sweet Little Duck"	4:28

== Charts ==
Chart performance
Chart (2003)	Peak position
Canadian Albums (Nielsen SoundScan)	82
Dutch Alternative Albums (Alternative Top 30)	8
UK Country Albums (OCC)	10
US Heatseekers Albums (Billboard)	20
