= Kelp Records =

- Founded: 1994
- Founder: Jon Bartlett
- Genre: Indie, folk, roots, pop
- Country of origin: Canada
- Location: Ottawa, Ontario
- Official website: kelprecords.com

Kelp Records is a Canadian record label based in Ottawa, Ontario, Canada. It was formed in March 1994 by Jon Bartlett in Fredericton, New Brunswick.

The record label has worked with a number of Canadian artists, including Andrew Vincent, The Acorn, Jim Bryson, HILOTRONS, Chris Page, Flecton Big Sky, Camp Radio, Andy Swan, The Michael Parks, The Flaps, Rhume and Greenfield Main. Other former roster members include Paperjack, Nineteenseventyeight, Professor Undressor, and Traiyf.

== Discography ==
CAT #	ARTIST	ALBUM	RELEASE DATE	FORMAT
Kp 072	Measha Brueggergosman	I've Got A Crush On You	May 8, 2012	CD/Digital
Kp 071	Andrew Vincent	Keep It That Way EP	April 5, 2011	Digital/7"
Kp 070	Camp Radio	Campista Socialista	September 6, 2011	CD/Digital (LP on Saved by Vinyl)
Kp 069	Adam and the Amethysts	Flickering Flashlight	October 4, 2011	LP/CD/Digital
Kp 066	Jim Bryson + The Weakerthans	The Falcon Lake Incident	October 19, 2010	LP (CD/Digital on MapleMusic Recordings)
Kp 065	Various Artists	Kelp 16	March 2010	CD/Digital; free MP3 download available on Bandcamp
Kp 063	The Michael Parks	The Rejected Michael Parks	May 1, 2009	Digital only
Kp 062	Chris Page	A Date With A Smoke Machine	February 16, 2010	CD/Digital
Kp 061	Jim Bryson	Live at First Baptist Church	April 28, 2009	CD/Digital
Kp 058	Andrew Vincent	Rotten Pear	January 27, 2009	CD/Digital
Kp 060	The Acorn/Ohbijou	Split 12"	October 7, 2008	LP/Digital
Kp 059	Flecton Big Sky	The Bright Side of Dying	November 18, 2008	LP/Digital
Kp 057	Various Artists	Kelp 14: Most Career Hits	April 25, 2008	CD/Digital
Kp 056	HILOTRONS	Happymatic	April 1, 2008	CD/Digital (LP on Saved by Vinyl)
Kp 055	Andy Swan	Ottawa	November 13, 2007	CD/Digital
Kp 054	Andy Swan	The Sunshine EP	October 16, 2007	Digital (free download)
Kp 053	Various Artists	Kelpmitzvah: Kelp Turns 13	March 13, 2007	CD/Digital
Kp 052	The Acorn	The Pink Ghosts (reissue)	April 24, 2007	CD/Digital
Kp 050	Jim Bryson	Where the Bungalows Roam	March 27, 2007	CD/Digital
Kp 048	Various Artists	Kelp 12: Will the Bytown be Unbroken	April 7, 2006	CD/Digital
Kp 047	Camp Radio	Camp Radio	May 23, 2006	CD/LP
Kp 046	Detective Kalita	The Michael Parks	May 23, 2006	CD/Digital
Kp 045	The Acorn	Blankets EP	November 26, 2005	CD/Digital
Kp 044	The Flaps	The Flaps	October 15, 2005	CD/Digital
Kp 043	Andy Swan	A.M. at the H.O.M.	June 8, 2005	CD/Digital
Kp 042	Flecton	Never Took a Wife	February 14, 2005	CD/Digital
Kp 040	Greenfield Main	Barnburners & Heartchurners	October 16, 2004	CD/Digital
Kp 039	The Acorn	The Pink Ghosts	July 30, 2004	CD/Digital
Kp 038	Proffessor Undressor	B.A.S.C. of Evil	October 31, 2003	CD
Kp 037	Recoilers	2 Years End	January 8, 2005	CD/Digital
Kp 036	Chris Page	Decide to Stay and Swim	November 25, 2003	CD/Digital
Kp 035	Detective Kalita	The Night We Ate the Cake	November 18, 2003	CD/Digital
Kp 032	Andrew Vincent & the Pirates	I Love the Modern Way	July 29, 2003	CD/Digital
Kp 031	Proffessor Undressor	The Sumi-E Experiment	May 20, 2003	CD
Kp 013	Steaming Toolie	transform form freely	1997	CD

== See also ==
- List of record labels
