= Louisiana's 71st House of Representatives district =

American legislative district

Louisiana's 71st State House of Representatives district
Representative
Roger William Wilder III; R–Denham Springs

Louisiana's 71st House of Representatives district is one of 105 Louisiana House of Representatives districts. It is currently represented by Republican Roger William Wilder III of Denham Springs.

== Geography ==
HD71 includes part of the Baton Rouge metropolitan area, including the city of Denham Springs.

== Election results ==
Year	Winning candidate	Party	Percent	Opponent	Party	Percent	Opponent	Party	Percent
2011	J. Rogers Pope	Republican	100%						
2015	J. Rogers Pope	Republican	100%						
2019	Buddy Mincey Jr.	Republican	76.7%	Lori Callais	Democratic	23.3%			
2023	Roger William Wilder III	Republican	56.9%	Jim Norred	Republican	31.8%	Walley Avara	Republican	11.3%
