= Wilbert Brockhouse Smith =

Canadian engineer (1910–1962)

William Brockhouse Smith
- Born: 1910; Lethbridge, Alberta
- Died: December 27, 1962 (aged 51–52); Ottawa, Ontario
- Education: University of British Columbia
- Awards: Lieutenant-Colonel Keith S. Rogers Memorial Engineering Award
- Engineering career
- Projects: Project Magnet

William Brockhouse Smith (1910 – December 27, 1962) was a Canadian engineer, government scientist, ufologist, and author of various patents and technical papers.

== Biography ==
=== Early life (1910 – 1939) ===
Smith received bachelor and graduate degrees in electrical engineering from the University of British Columbia, graduating with an MSc in 1934. From 1934 to 1939, Smith was the chief engineer of Vancouver radio station CJOR.

=== Department of Transport work (1939 – 1950) ===
In 1939, Smith joined the federal Department of Transport (DOT) and began work to help develop Canada's wartime signal monitoring system. Broadcasting was in its infancy at this time. Smith's work included researching radio waves and their propagation, ground wave conductivities, frequency and power standards, communications with ships at sea, the design and construction of antenna systems and minimizing interference with US broadcasting frequencies. Smith also investigated various atmospheric effects, auroras, cosmic radiation and geo-magnetism and believed the earth's magnetic field was a potential source of energy.

In 1947, Smith established Canada's far north ionospheric monitoring system. He was Canada's chief delegate to the North American Regional Broadcasting Agreement (NARBA) conferences in 1949 and 1950 that set AM and FM broadcast standards for Canada, the US, Mexico, Cuba, the Dominican Republic and Haiti. In 1952, Smith helped to implement the Canada - US Television Allocation Agreement. At the time, Smith was Senior Radio Engineer for the DOT's Broadcast and Measurements section.

=== UFO research (1950 – 1962) ===
At the 1950 NARBA conference, Smith learned from US scientist Dr. Robert Sarbacher that Americans believed flying saucers were real and their investigations of them, led by Dr. Vannevar Bush, were more highly classified than information about the hydrogen bomb. After his return to Canada, Smith wrote a memo dated November 21, 1950 which became classified 'Top Secret' until being downgraded to 'Confidential' in 1969. Smith requested approval to investigate geo-magnetics as a potential way to detect flying saucers and help prove or disprove their existence. His request was approved as a secret project called Project Magnet. The Project also involved Dr. James Watt, a Defense Research Board theoretical physicist, John Thompson, a Department of Transport technical expert, Prof. J.T. Wilson of the University of Toronto and Dr. G.D. Garland, a Dominion Observatory gravitational expert.

In 1952, Smith was appointed to Project Second Storey, a Canadian committee set up to consider "the UFO problem".

The front page of the November 11, 1953 Ottawa Journal newspaper reported on the UFO sighting station at Shirleys Bay near Ottawa that used a magnetometer, gamma-ray detector, radio receiver, gravity meter and recording equipment to detect anomalous readings.

In 1957, Smith was appointed the DOT's Superintendent of Radio Regulations Engineering, Telecommunications Division. Smith claimed his research showed that gravity could be created and controlled and he had been working on an anti-gravity device before he died of cancer in 1962, but had taken it apart, telling his wife that the world was not ready for it.

== Legacy ==
In 1963, Smith was posthumously awarded the Keith S. Rogers Memorial Engineering Award for dedicated service in the advancement of technical standards in Canadian Broadcasting.

In 2015, the world's first detection of gravitational waves took place at the Laser Interferometer Gravitational-Wave Observatories (LIGO) located at Hanford, Washington and Livingston, Louisiana.

After Smith's death, his wife published his unfinished book called The New Science. Arthur Bray, a retired Canadian military pilot, acquired Smith's other papers, which later were donated to the University of Ottawa.
