= Louisiana's 13th State Senate district =

American legislative district

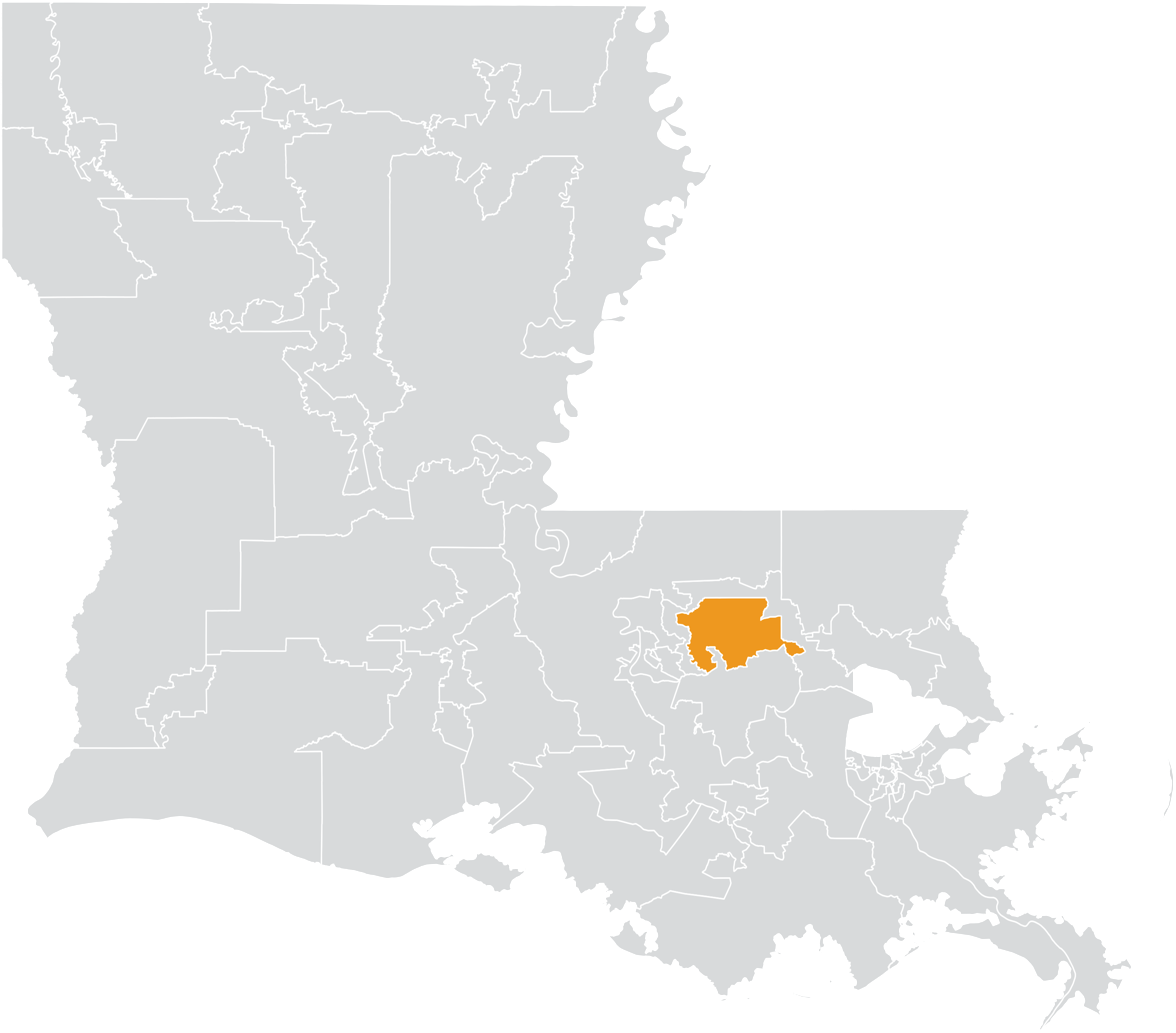
Senator
Valarie Hodges; R–Denham Springs
- Registration: 47.9% Republican; 23.0% Democratic; 29.1% No party preference
- Demographics: 88% White; 5% Black; 4% Hispanic; 0% Asian; 2% Other
- Population (2019): 128,865
- Registered voters: 76,036

Louisiana's 13th State Senate district is one of 39 districts in the Louisiana State Senate. It has been represented by Republican Valarie Hodges since 2024, succeeding fellow Republican J. Rogers Pope. District 13 is currently the most Republican-leaning district in the Senate.

== Geography ==
District 13 covers most of Livingston Parish and smaller parts of East Baton Rouge and Tangipahoa Parishes to the east of Baton Rouge, including some or all of Denham Springs, Walker, Livingston, and Ponchatoula.

The district overlaps with Louisiana's 1st and 6th congressional districts, and with the 64th, 65th, 71st, 73rd, 81st, and 95th districts of the Louisiana House of Representatives.

== Recent election results ==
Louisiana uses a jungle primary system. If no candidate receives 50% in the first round of voting, when all candidates appear on the same ballot regardless of party, the top-two finishers advance to a runoff election.

=== 2019 ===
2019 Louisiana State Senate election, District 13
Party	Candidate	Votes	%
Republican	J. Rogers Pope	17,030	50.4
Republican	Edith Carlin	12,860	38.1
Republican	Deven Cavalier	3,869	11.5
Total votes		33,759	100
Republican hold			

=== 2015 ===
2015 Louisiana State Senate election, District 13
Party	Candidate	Votes	%
Republican	Dale M. Erdey (incumbent)	17,117	63.9
Republican	Derek Babcock	9,655	36.1
Total votes		26,772	100
Republican hold			

=== 2011 ===
2011 Louisiana State Senate election, District 13
Party	Candidate	Votes	%
Republican	Dale M. Erdey (incumbent)	19,831	64.8
Republican	Derek Babcock	10,785	35.2
Total votes		30,616	100
Republican hold			

=== Federal and statewide results ===
Year	Office	Results
2020	President	Trump 85.2–13.1%
2019	Governor (runoff)	Rispone 71.9–28.1%
2016	President	Trump 85.8–10.9%
2015	Governor (runoff)	Vitter 62.7–37.3%
2014	Senate (runoff)	Cassidy 84.7–15.3%
2012	President	Romney 86.0–12.1%
