= Project Second Storey =

Canadian government committee on UFOs

Project Second Storey (also known as Project Second Story, Project Flying Saucers or Project Theta) was an interdepartmental committee set up by the Government of Canada on 22 April 1952 to establish an official governmental position on unidentified flying objects (UFOs). The committee was sponsored by the Defence Research Board and chaired by astronomer Peter Millman of the Dominion Observatory.

In 1952, in connection with the establishment of Project Magnet by Wilbert Brockhouse Smith at the Department of Transport, the committee was formed by members of other government agencies and dedicated solely to dealing with "flying saucer" reports. Its main purpose was to collect, catalogue and correlate data from UFO sighting reports. The committee was dissolved in 1954.

== See also ==
- Project Magnet
