= Project Magnet (Canada) =

UFO study programme

Coordinates: 45°20′52″N 75°52′34″W

Project Magnet was an unidentified flying object (UFO) study programme established by Transport Canada in December 1950 under the direction of Wilbert Brockhouse Smith, senior radio engineer for Transport Canada's Broadcast and Measurements Section. It was formally active until mid-1954 and informally active (without government funding) until Smith's death in 1962. Smith eventually concluded that UFOs were probably extraterrestrial in origin and likely operated by manipulation of magnetism.

== History ==
Smith made a request to use the facilities of the Department of Transport to study UFOs. The project was formally approved on 2 December 1950, with the intention to collect data about UFOs and apply any recovered data to practical engineering and technology. The ultimate goal of the project was to apply any findings on the subject of geomagnetism to the possibility of exploiting Earth's magnetic field as a source of propulsion for vehicles. Smith and his colleagues in government believed that UFOs, if real, might hold the key to this new source of power. A small-scale undertaking, the project used DOT facilities, with some assistance from personnel at the Defence Research Board (DRB) and the National Research Council. In June 1952 Smith issued a preliminary report arguing that UFOs likely came from intelligent, extraterrestrial sources and almost certainly manipulated magnetism for flight. A 1953 report reiterated these conclusions. Also in April 1952, the Canadian government established Project Second Storey, a parallel UFO research project, with Smith also involved. It consisted of a group of scientists and military officers who met periodically to consider the UFO question and to recommend government action. Smith reported to Second Storey on some of Project Magnet's findings and conclusions.

Smith believed UFOs were linked to psychic phenomena and believed himself to be in contact with extraterrestrial beings who communicated to him through telepathy. Smith wrote a number of articles for Topside, the publication of the Ottawa New Sciences Club, which he founded. In those articles, he outlined the philosophy of the "Space Brothers" with whom he claimed to be in contact. The articles were later collected and published posthumously in 1969 under the title The Boys from Topside.

=== Shirley's Bay ===
In October 1952, Smith set up an observatory at Shirley's Bay outside Ottawa to study reports of UFO sightings, believing that UFOs would emit physical characteristics that could be measured. A number of sighting reports were investigated by Project Magnet, but the project was shut down in 1954. Smith was allowed to use the Shirley's Bay facilities with his own funding and did so until his death in 1962.

== See also ==
- Project Second Storey
- Project Sign

== Sources ==
- Clark, Jerome, The UFO Encyclopedia: The Phenomenon from the Beginning, Volume 2, L-Z Detroit: Omnigraphics, 1998 (2nd edition, 2005), ISBN 0-7808-0097-4
- Story, Ronald J. (editor) and J. Richard Greenwell (consulting editor), The Encyclopedia of UFOs, Garden City: Doubleday & Co, 1980, ISBN 0-385-13677-3
- Canada's Unidentified Flying Objects: The Search for the Unknown at Library and Archives Canada
