= Peter Millman =

Canadian astronomer

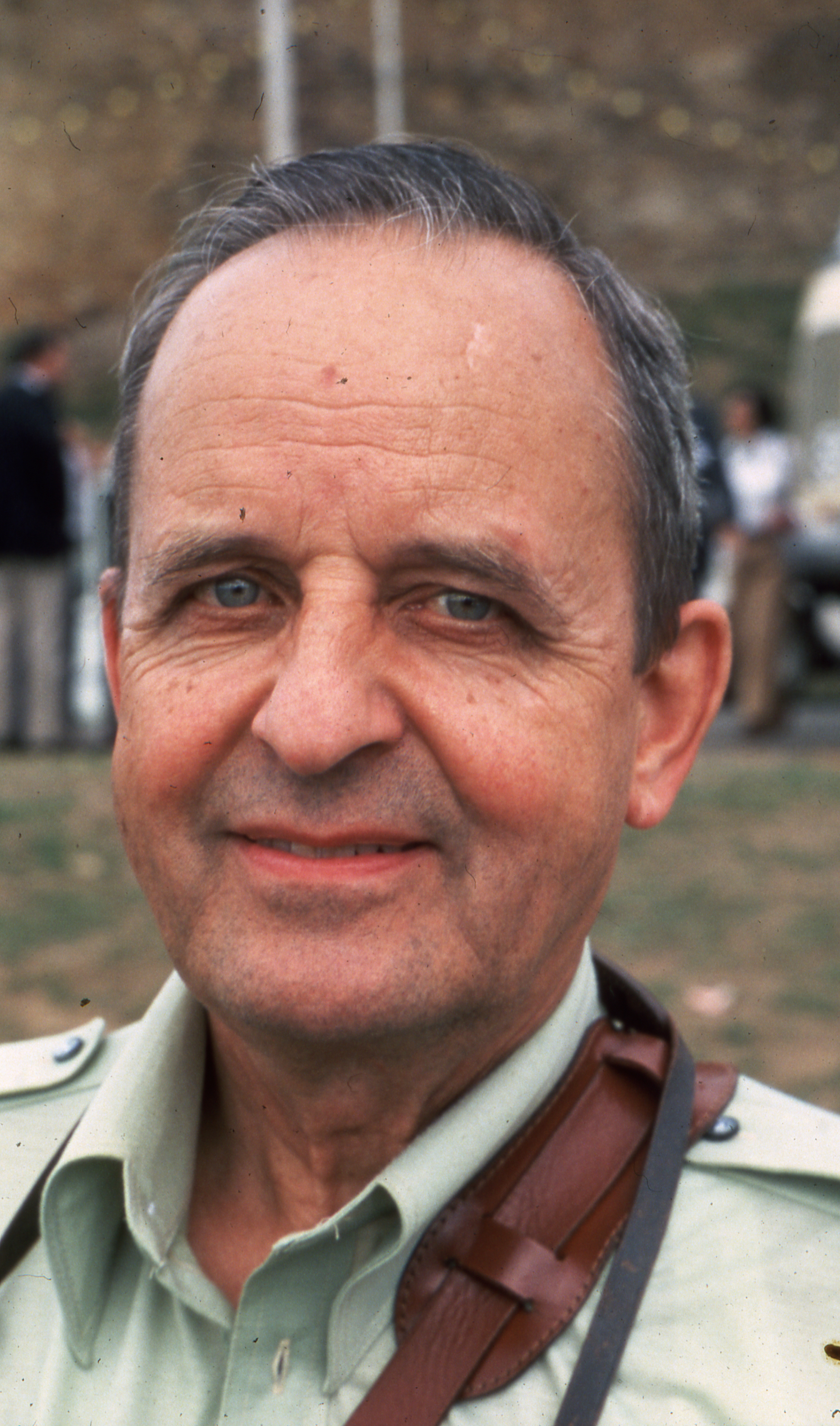
- Millman in 1976
- Born: Peter Mackenzie Millman; August 10, 1906; Toronto, Ontario
- Died: December 11, 1990 (aged 84); Ottawa, Ontario
- Education: University of Toronto; Harvard University
- Known for: meteor studies
- Spouse: Margaret B. Gray (m. 1931)
- Awards: J. Lawrence Smith Medal (1954)
- Scientific career
- Fields: Astronomy; Meteoritics
- Institutions: David Dunlap Observatory; Dominion Observatory; National Research Council
- Military career
- Allegiance: Canada
- Branch: Royal Canadian Air Force
- Service years: 1941–1946
- Rank: Squadron Leader

Peter Mackenzie Millman (August 10, 1906 – December 11, 1990) was a Canadian astronomer and meteoriticist. He worked at the David Dunlap Observatory from 1933 until 1940. In early 1941 he enlisted with the Royal Canadian Air Force. In 1946 he joined the Dominion Observatory in Ottawa. Millman was the chair of Project Second Storey, an interdepartmental committee on unidentified flying objects, for the duration of its existence from 1952 to 1954. Millman did not believe that UFOs were of extraterrestrial origin and considered the project a waste of resources.

He transferred to the National Research Council as head of upper atmospheric research in 1955.

During his graduate studies at Harvard University he started a systematic study of meteor spectra at the suggestion of Harlow Shapley in 1929. He continued the work on meteors throughout his active scientific life.

He organized one of his most successful observational campaigns in 1946, when on the night of October 9/10 a spectacular shower of the Giacobinids (October Draconids) provided many important photographic spectra.

He was awarded the J. Lawrence Smith Medal in 1954.

A crater on Mars and the minor planet 2904 Millman were named in his honor.
