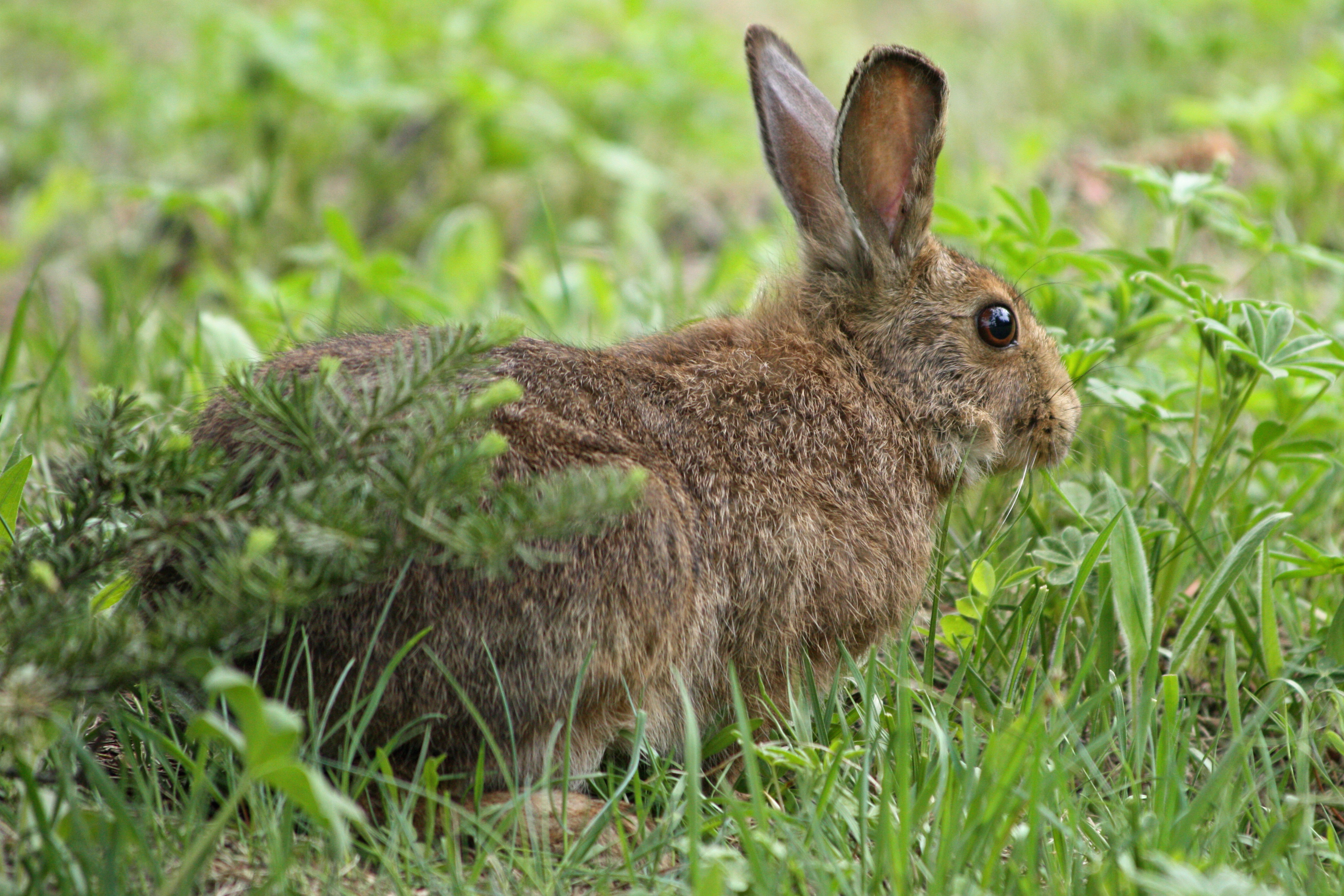
- Summer coat, photographed in Olympic National Park, Washington
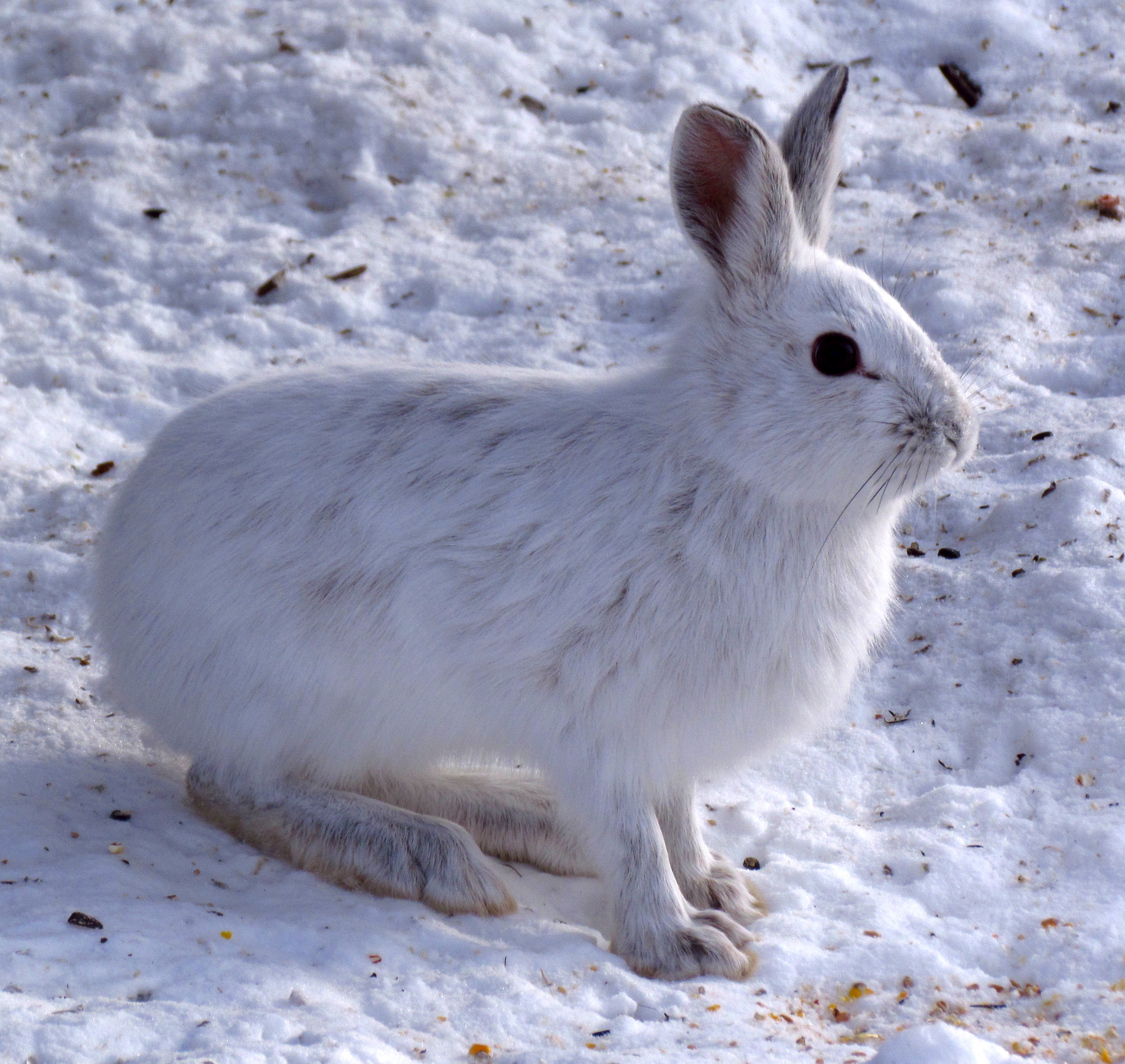
- Winter coat, photographed near Shirleys Bay, Ontario

Conservation status
- Least Concern (IUCN 3.1)

- Secure (NatureServe)

Scientific classification
- Kingdom: Animalia
- Phylum: Chordata
- Class: Mammalia
- Order: Lagomorpha
- Family: Leporidae
- Genus: Lepus
- Species: L. americanus

Binomial name
- Lepus americanus Erxleben, 1777
- Snowshoe hare range

Synonyms
- List: Lepus hudsonius Pallas, 1778; Lepus nanus von Schreber, 1789; Lepus wardii H. R. Schinz, 1825; Lepus virginianus Harlan, 1825; Lepus borealis H. R. Schinz, 1845; Lepus washingtonii S. F. Baird, 1855; Lepus bairdii Hayden, 1869; Lepus klamathensis C. H. Merriam, 1899; Lepus bishopi J. A. Allen, 1899; Lepus saliens Osgood, 1900; Lepus niediecki Matschie, 1907; Lepus bairdi E. W. Nelson, 1909; Lepus washingtoni E. W. Nelson, 1909

= Snowshoe hare =

Species of mammal

The snowshoe hare (Lepus americanus), also called the varying hare or snowshoe rabbit, is a species of hare found in North America. The "snowshoe" moniker refers to the hare's large hind feet, which prevent it from sinking into soft snow, much like snowshoes.

The hare has two seasonal coats which aid in camouflaging the animal. In summer, the hare is covered in short, brown fur; in winter this is exchanged for a longer coat of white fur. The name "varying hare" refers to this seasonal change in appearance.

A major predator of the snowshoe hare is the Canada lynx. Historical records of animals caught by fur hunters over decades show the lynx and hare numbers rising and falling in a cycle, which has made the hare known to biology students worldwide as a case study of the relationship between numbers of predators and their prey.

== Taxonomy and etymology ==
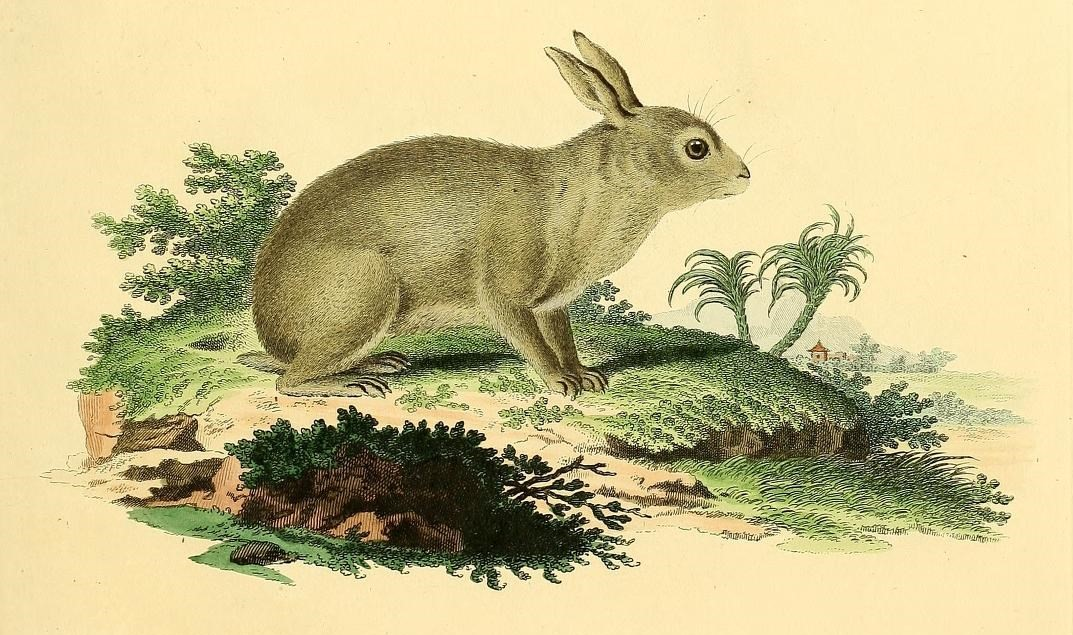
Engraving of the snowshoe hare by Johann Nufsbiegel

The snowshoe hare was first described in 1777 by the German naturalist Johann Christian Polycarp Erxleben. He called it the American hare, and placed it in the genus Lepus, noting that it was intermediate in size between the European rabbit (Oryctolagus cuniculus) and the mountain hare (Lepus timidus) but had longer hindfeet than the latter species. The following subspecies are known:

- Lepus americanus americanus (Erxleben) – Ontario, Manitoba, Saskatchewan, Alberta, Montana, and North Dakota
- L. a. cascadensis (Nelson) – British Columbia and Washington
- L. a. columbiensis (Rhoads) – British Columbia, Alberta, and Washington
- L. a. dalli (Merriam) – Mackenzie District, British Columbia, Alaska, Yukon
- L. a. klamathensis (Merriam) – Oregon and California
- L. a. oregonus (Orr) – Oregon
- L. a. pallidus (Cowan) – British Columbia
- L. a. phaeonotus (J. A. Allen) – Ontario, Manitoba, Saskatchewan, Michigan, Wisconsin, and Minnesota
- L. a. pineus (Dalquest) – British Columbia, Idaho, and Washington
- L. a. seclusus (Baker and Hankins) – Wyoming
- L. a. struthopus (Bangs) – Newfoundland, Nova Scotia, New Brunswick, Prince Edward Island, Quebec, and Maine
- L. a. tahoensis (Orr) – California, western Nevada
- L. a. virginianus (Harlan) – Ontario, Quebec, Maine, New Hampshire, Vermont, Massachusetts, New York, Pennsylvania
- L. a. washingtonii (Baird) – British Columbia, Washington, and Oregon

== Description ==
Snowshoe hares range in length from 413 to 518 mm (16.3 to 20.4 in), of which 39 to 52 mm (1.5 to 2.0 in) are tail. The hind foot, long and broad, measures 117 to 147 mm (4.6 to 5.8 in) in length. The ears are 62 to 70 mm (2.4 to 2.8 in) from notch to tip. Snowshoe hares usually weigh between 1.43 and 1.55 kg (3.15 to 3.42 lb). Males are slightly smaller than females, as is typical for leporids. In the summer, the coat is a grizzled rusty or grayish brown, with a blackish middorsal line, buffy flanks and a white belly. The face and legs are cinnamon brown. The ears are brownish with black tips and white or creamy borders. During the winter, the fur is almost entirely white, except for black eyelids and the blackened tips on the ears. The soles of the feet are densely furred, with stiff hairs (forming the snowshoe) on the hind feet.

== Distribution and habitat ==
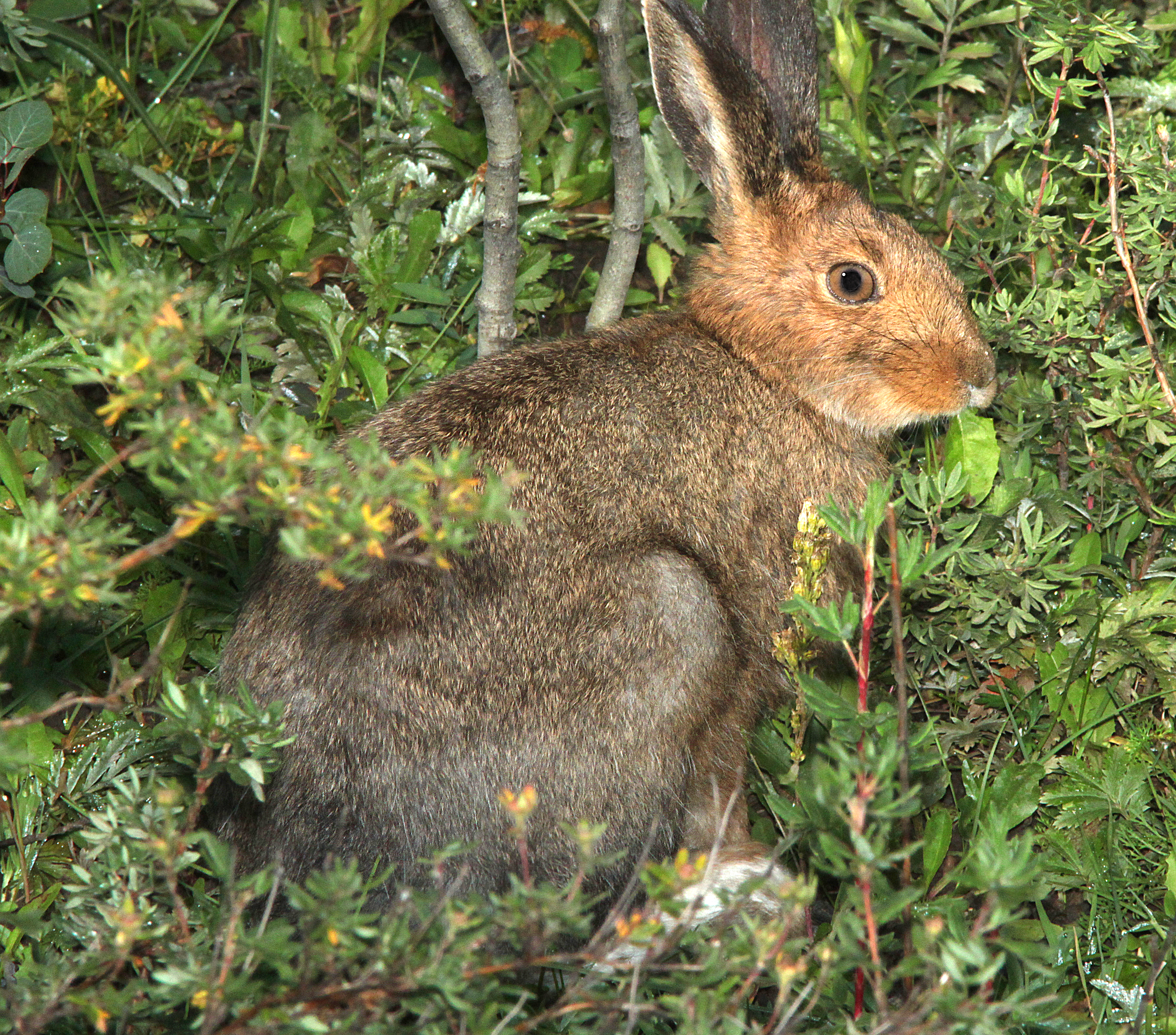
Snowshoe hare in a dense shrub layer

=== Distribution ===
Snowshoe hares occur from Newfoundland to Alaska; south in the Sierra Nevada to central California; in the Rocky Mountains to southern Utah and northern New Mexico; and in the Appalachian Mountains to West Virginia. Populations in its southern range, such as in Ohio, Maryland, North Carolina, New Jersey, Tennessee, and Virginia have been extirpated.

==== Fossil record ====
During the Late Pleistocene, the snowshoe hare was found south of its current range in the area around Herculaneum, Missouri.

=== Habitat ===
Snowshoe hares are primarily found in areas with dense plant coverage such as boreal forests, upper montane forests and wetlands, though are occasionally seen in more open areas like agricultural land.

In Utah, snowshoe hares used Gambel oak (Quercus gambelli) in the northern portion of the Gambel oak range. In the Southwest, the southernmost populations of snowshoe hares occur in the Sangre de Cristo Mountains, New Mexico, in subalpine scrub: narrow bands of shrubby and prostrate conifers at and just below timberline that are usually composed of Engelmann spruce, bristlecone pine, limber pine, and juniper.

In Minnesota, snowshoe hares are found in uplands and wetlands. In New England, snowshoe hares favor second-growth forests.

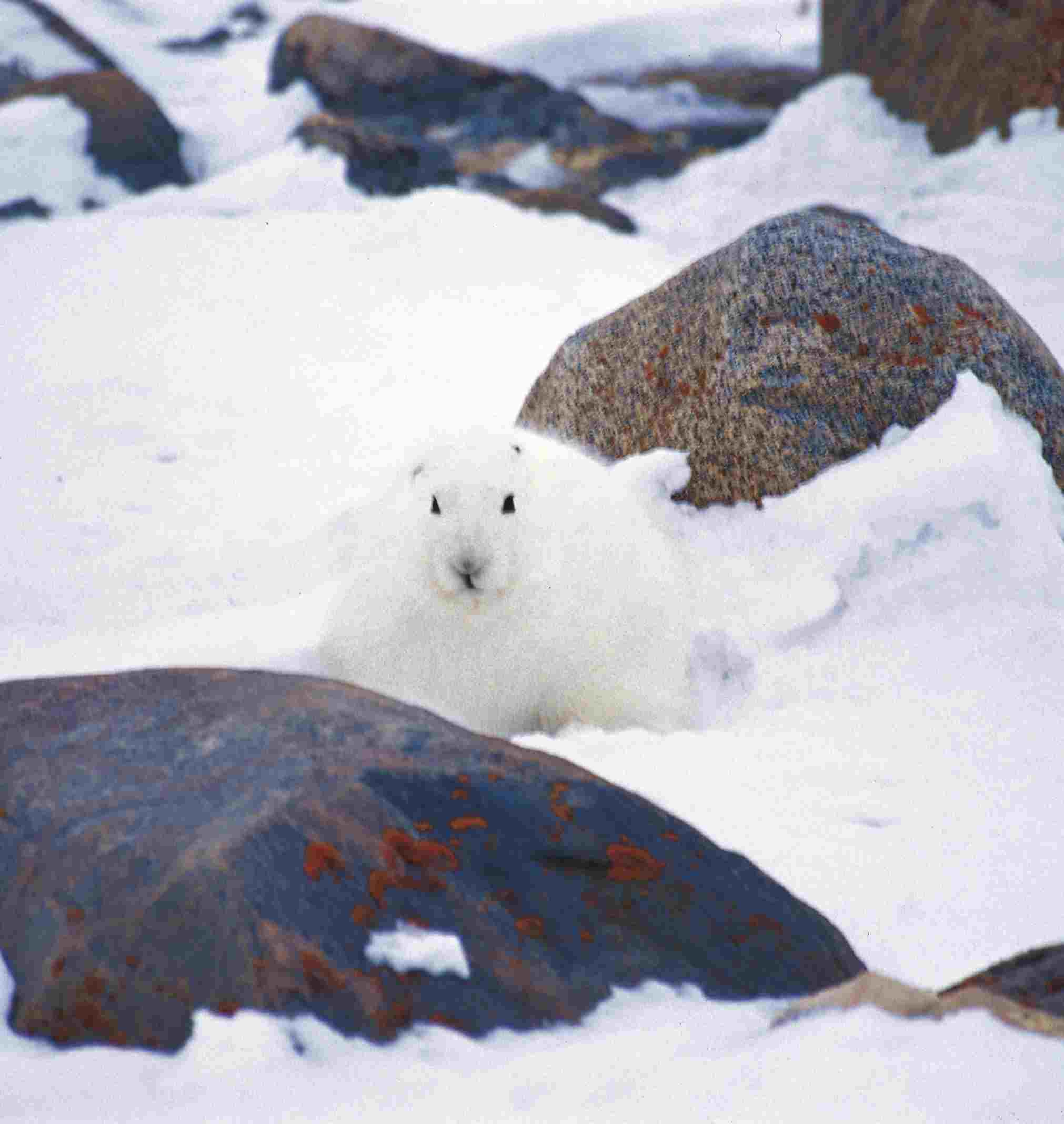
Snowshoe hare in winter, well-camouflaged but lacking cover.

Major variables in habitat quality include average visual obstruction and browse biomass. Snowshoe hares prefer young forests with abundant understories. The presence of cover is the primary determinant of habitat quality, and is more significant than food availability or species composition. Species composition does, however, influence population density; dense softwood understories support greater snowshoe hare density than hardwoods because of cover quality. In Maine, female snowshoe hares were observed to be more common on sites with less cover but more nutritious forage; males tended to be found on sites with heavier cover.

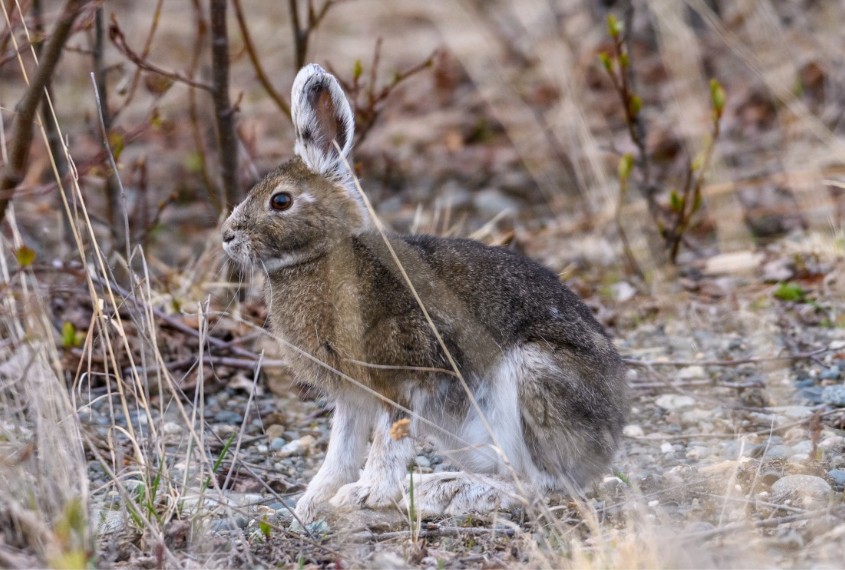
A hare in autumn, seen with partial winter coat

Winter browse availability depends on height of understory brush and winter snow depth; 6-to-8-foot-tall (1.8 to 2.4 m) saplings with narrow stem diameters are required for winter browse in heavy snow.

In northern regions, snowshoe hares occupy conifer and mixed forests in all stages of succession, but early successional forests foster peak abundance. Deciduous forests are usually occupied only in early stages of succession. In New England, snowshoe hares preferred second-growth deciduous, coniferous, and mixed woods with dense brushy understories; they appear to prefer shrubby old-field areas, early- to mid-successional burns, shrub-swamps, bogs, and upper montane krumholz vegetation. In Maine, snowshoe hares were more active in clearcut areas than in partially cut or uncut areas. Sapling densities were highest on 12- to 15-year-old plots; these plots were used more than younger stands. In northern Utah, they occupied all the later stages of succession on quaking aspen and spruce-fir, but were not observed in meadows. In Alberta, snowshoe hares use upland shrub-sapling stages of regenerating aspens (either postfire or postharvest). In British Columbia overstocked juvenile lodgepole pine (Pinus contorta) stands formed optimal snowshoe hare habitat.

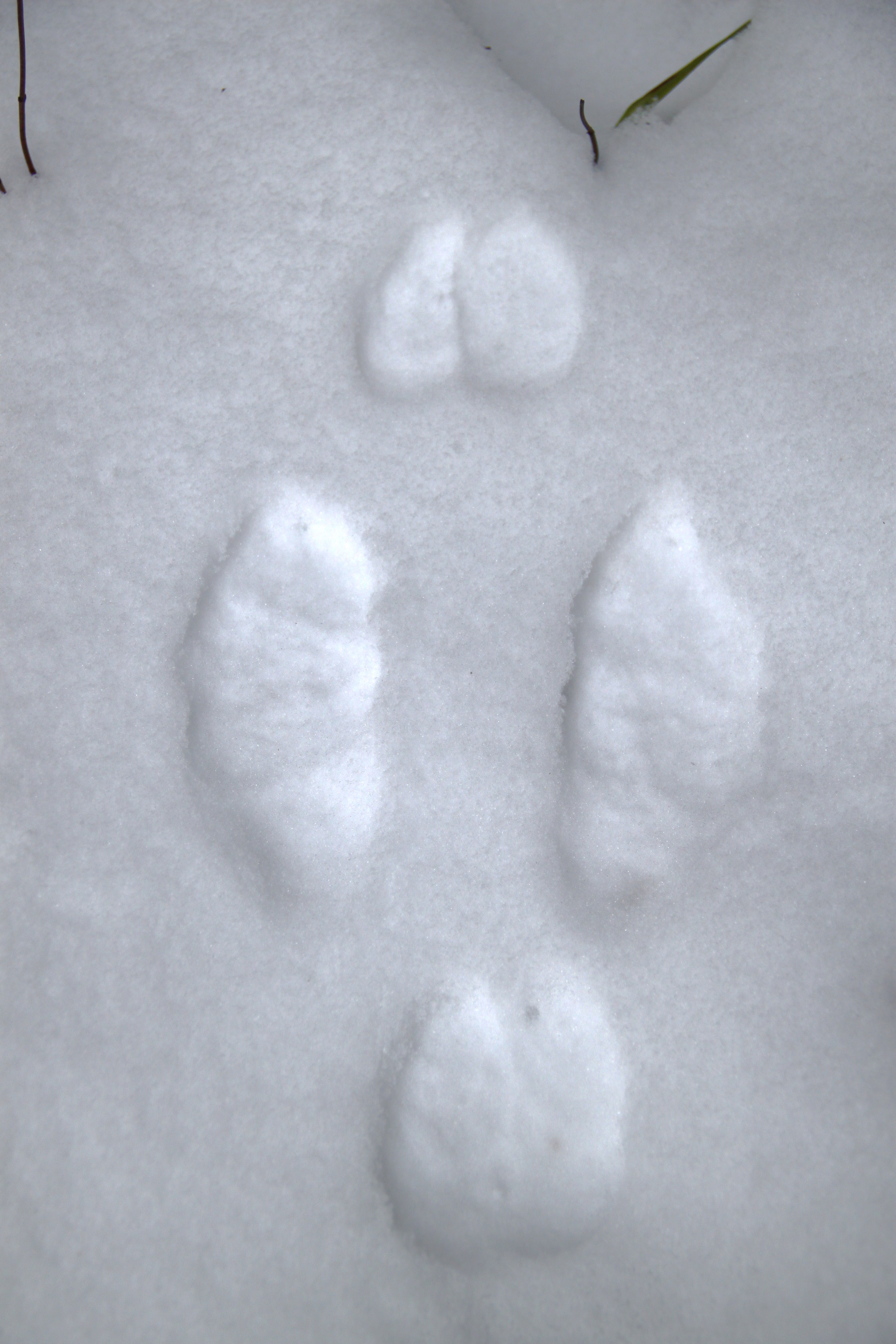
Tracks of a hopping snowshoe hare in snow; rounder forefeet together, longer rear feet apart, forefeet together again.

In western Washington, most unburned, burned, or scarified clearcuts will normally be fully occupied by snowshoe hares within four to five years, as vegetation becomes dense. In older stands (more than 25 years), stem density begins to decline and cover for snowshoe hares decreases. However, in north-central Washington, they may not colonize clearcuts until six or seven years, and it may take 20 to 25 years for their density to reach maximum. Winter snowshoe hare pellet counts were highest in 20-year-old lodgepole pine stands, lower in older lodgepole stands, and lowest in spruce-dominated stands. In western Oregon, snowshoe hares were abundant only in early successional stages, including stable brushfields. In west-central Oregon, an old-growth Douglas-fir forest was clearcut and monitored through 10 years of succession. A few snowshoe hares were noted in adjacent virgin forest plots; they represented widely scattered, sparse populations. One snowshoe hare was observed on the disturbed plot 2.5 years after it had been clearcut and burned; at this stage, ground cover was similar to that of the uncut forest. By 9 years after disturbance, snowshoe hare density had increased markedly.

In western Washington, snowshoe hares routinely used steep slopes where cover was adequate; most studies, however, suggest they tend to prefer gentle slopes. Moonlight increases snowshoe hare vulnerability to predation, particularly in winter. They tend to avoid open areas during bright phases of the moon and during bright periods of a single night. Their activity usually shifts from coniferous understories in winter to hardwood understories in summer.

Vegetative structure plays an important role in the size of snowshoe hare home ranges. Snowshoe hares wander up to 5 miles (8 km) when food is scarce. In Montana home ranges are smaller in brushy woods than in open woods. In Colorado and Utah, the average home range of both sexes was 20 acres (8.1 ha). On the Island of Montreal in Quebec, the average daily range for both sexes was 4 acres (1.6 ha) in old-field mixed woods. In Montana, the home range averaged 25 acres (10 ha) for males and 19 acres (7.6 ha) for females. In Oregon the average snowshoe hare home range was 14.6 acres (5.9 ha).

=== Cover requirements ===
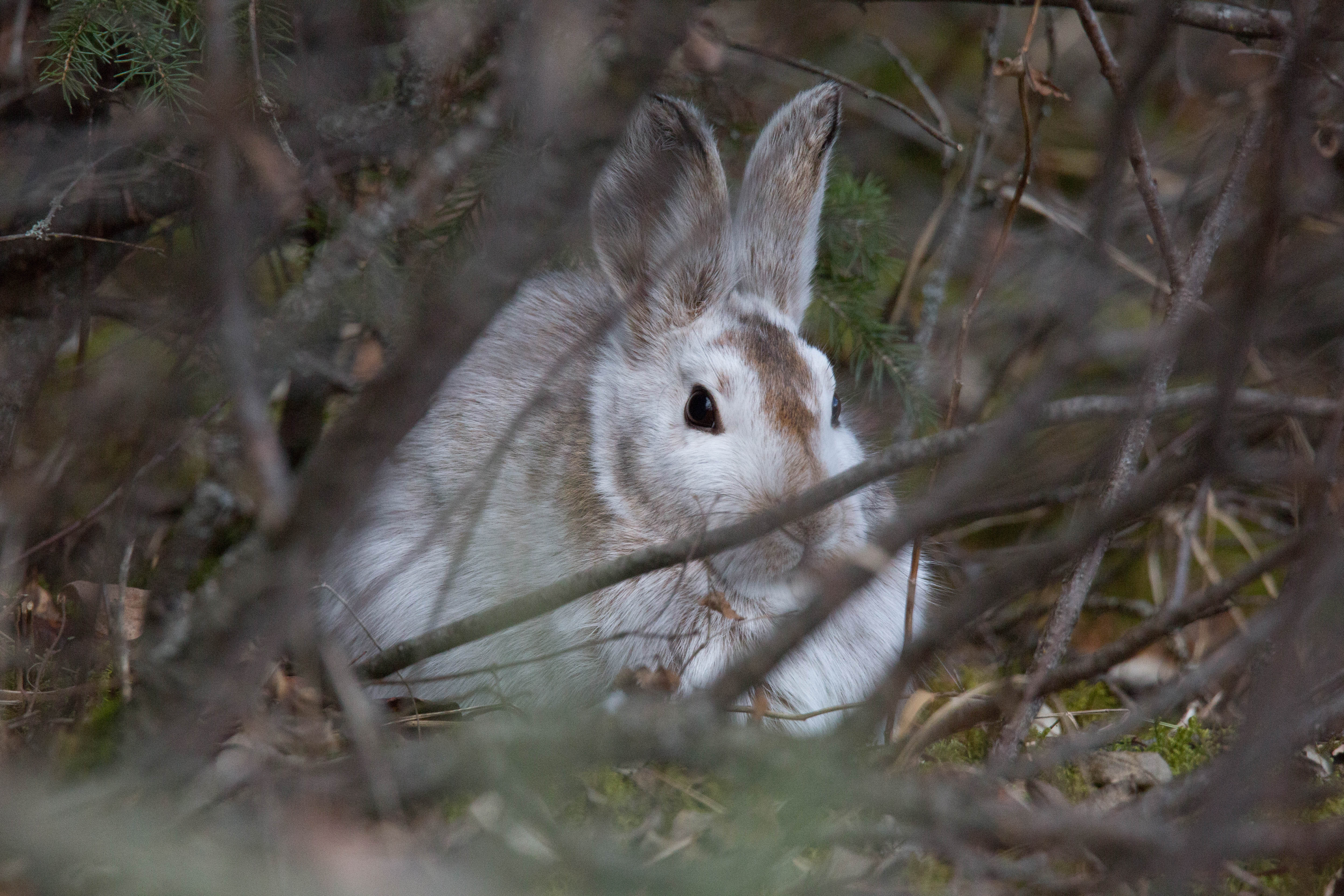
Snowshoe hare in partly coniferous cover

Snowshoe hares require dense, brushy, usually coniferous cover; thermal and escape cover are especially important for young hares. Low brush provides hiding, escape, and thermal cover. Heavy cover 10 feet (3 m) above ground provides protection from avian predators, and heavy cover 3.3 feet (1 m) tall provides cover from terrestrial predators. Overwinter survival increases with increased cover. A wide variety of habitat types are used if cover is available. Base visibility in good snowshoe hare habitat ranges from 2% at 16.5 feet (5 m) distance to 0% at 66 feet (20 m). Travel cover is slightly more open, ranging from 14.7% visibility at 16.5 feet (5 m) to 2.6% at 66 feet (20 m). Areas with horizontal vegetation density of 40 to 100% at 50 feet (15 m) are adequate snowshoe hare habitat in Utah.

== Behavior and ecology ==
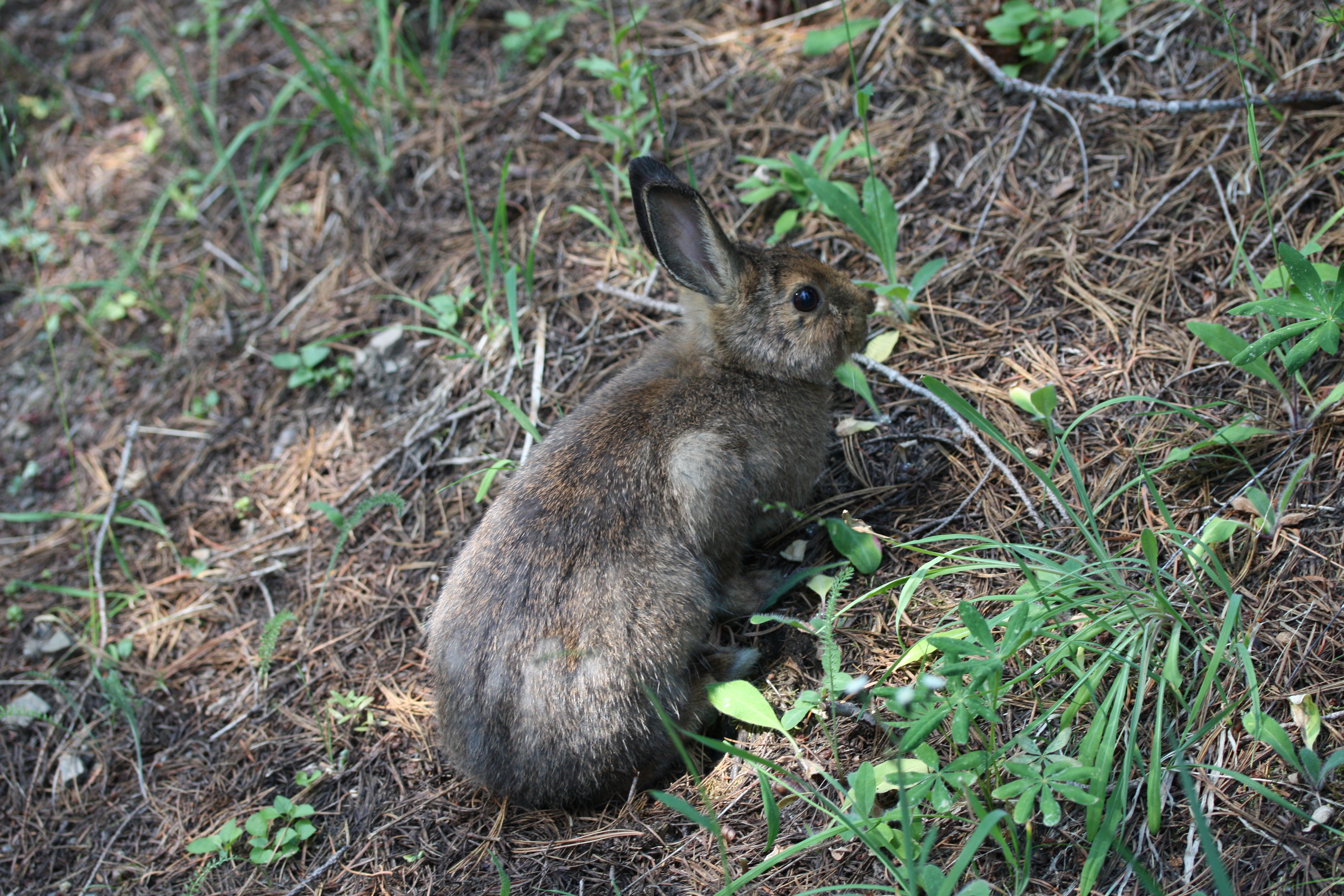
Juveniles are usually more active and less cautious than adults.

Snowshoe hares are crepuscular and nocturnal. They are shy and secretive and spend most of the day in shallow depressions, called forms, scraped out under clumps of ferns, brush thickets, and downed piles of timber. They occasionally use the large burrows of mountain beavers (Aplodontia rufa) as forms. Diurnal activity level increases during the breeding season. Juveniles are usually more active and less cautious than adults.

=== Reproduction ===
Snowshoe hares are active year-round. The breeding season for hares is stimulated by new vegetation and varies with latitude, location, and yearly events (such as weather conditions and phase of snowshoe hare population cycle). Breeding generally begins in late December to January and lasts until July or August . In northwestern Oregon, male peak breeding activity (as determined by testes weight) occurs in May and is at the minimum in November. In Ontario, the peak is in May and in Newfoundland, the peak is in June. Female estrus begins in March in Newfoundland, Alberta, and Maine, and in early April in Michigan and Colorado. First litters of the year are born from mid-April to May.

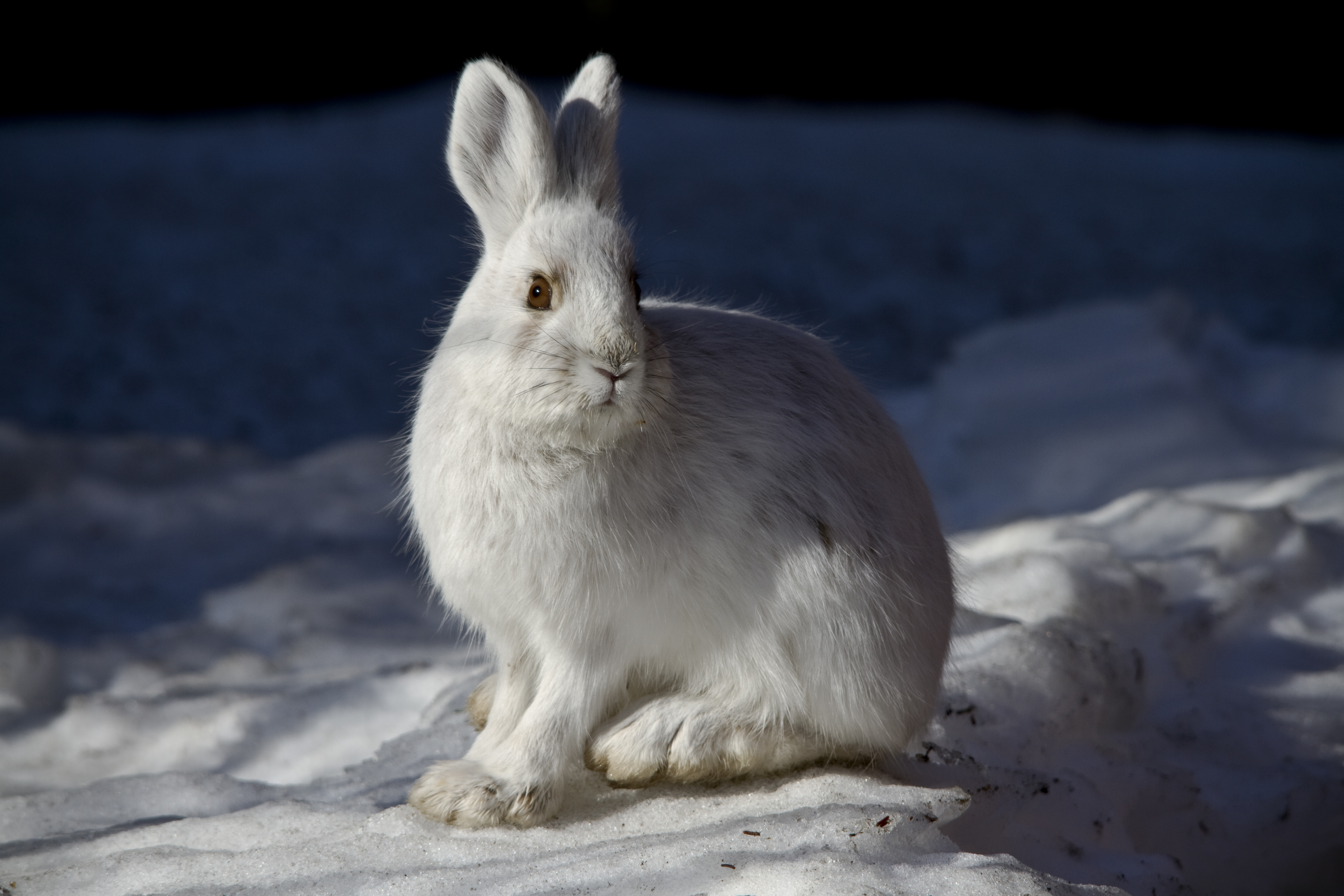
Snowshoe hares are most active in twilight and at night, but are active year-round. This hare is seen as breeding season begins, in late April in Alaska.

The gestation period is 35 to 40 days; most studies report 37 days as the average length of gestation. Litters average three to five leverets depending on latitude, elevation, and phase of population cycle, ranging from one to seven. Deep snow-pack increases the amount of upper-branch browse available to snowshoe hares in winter, and therefore has a positive relationship with the nutritional status of breeding adults. Litters are usually smaller in the southern sections of their range since there is less snow. Newborns are fully furred, open-eyed, and mobile. They leave the natal form within a short time after birth, often within 24 hours. After leaving the birthplace, siblings stay near each other during the day, gathering once each evening to nurse. Weaning occurs at 25 to 28 days except for the last litter of the season, which may nurse for two months or longer.

Female snowshoe hares can become pregnant anytime after the 35th day of gestation. The second litter can therefore be conceived before the first litter is born (snowshoe hares have twin uteri). Pregnancy rates ranged from 78 to 100% for females during the period of first litter production, 82 to 100% for second litters, and for the periods of third and fourth litters pregnancy rates vary with population cycle. In Newfoundland, the average number of litters per female per year ranged from 2.9 to 3.5, and in Alberta the range was from 2.7 to 3.3. The number of litters per year varies with phase of population cycle (see below). In Alberta the average number of litters per year was almost 3 just after a population peak and 4 just after the population low. Females normally first breed as 1-year-olds. Juvenile breeding is rare and has only been observed in females from the first litter of the year and only in years immediately following a low point in the population cycle.

In the Yukon, 30-day survival of radio-tagged leverets was 46%, 15%, and 43% for the first, second, and third litters of the year, respectively. There were no differences in mortality in plots with food added. The main proximate cause of mortality was predation by small mammals, including red squirrels (Tamiasciurus hudsonicus) and Arctic ground squirrels (Spermophilus parryii). Littermates tended to live or die together more often than by chance. Individual survival was negatively related to litter size and positively related to body size at birth. Litter size is negatively correlated with body size at birth.

=== Diet ===
Snowshoe hares eat a variety of plant materials. Forage type varies with season. Succulent green vegetation is consumed when available from spring to fall; after the first frost, buds, twigs, evergreen needles, and bark form the bulk of snowshoe hare diets until spring greenup. Snowshoe hares typically feed at night and follow well-worn forest paths to feed on various plants and trees.

==== Winter ====
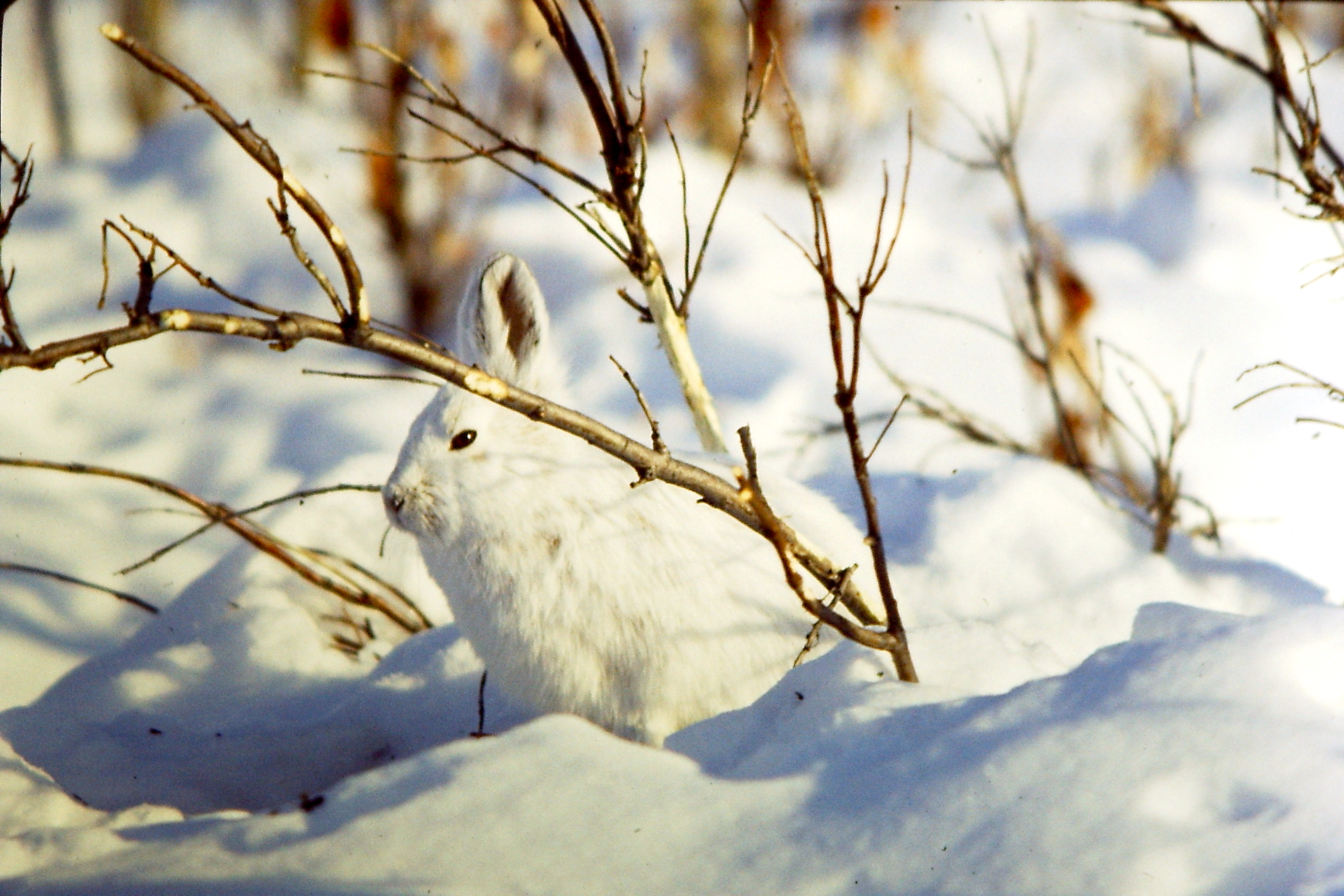
Snowshoe hare amid narrow woody stems bearing the marks of its teeth. In winter snow, stems are essential browse.

Snowshoe hares prefer branches, twigs, and small stems up to 0.25 inch (6.3 mm) diameter; larger stems are sometimes used in winter. In the Yukon, they normally eat fast-growing birches and willows, and avoid spruce. At high densities, however, the apical shoots of small spruce are eaten. The snowshoe hare winter diet is dominated by bog birch (Betula glandulosa), which is preferred but not always available. Greyleaf willow (Salix glauca) is eaten most often when bog birch is not available. Buffaloberry (Shepherdia canadensis) is the fourth most common diet item. White spruce (Picea glauca) is eaten, but not preferred. In Alaska, spruce, willows, and alders comprise 75% of snowshoe hare diets; spruce needles make up nearly 40% of the diet. In northwestern Oregon, winter foods include needles and tender bark of Sitka spruce, Douglas-fir, and western hemlock (Tsuga heterophylla); leaves and green twigs of salal; buds, twigs, and bark of willows; and green herbs. In north-central Washington, willows and birches are not plentiful; snowshoe hares browse the tips of lodgepole pine seedlings. In Utah, winter foods include Douglas-fir, willows, snowberry (Symphoricarpos spp.), maples, and serviceberry (Amelanchier spp.). In Minnesota, aspens, willows, hazelnut (Corylus spp.), ferns (Pteridophyta spp.), birches, alders, sumacs (Rhus spp.), and strawberries (Fragaria spp.) are winter foods. Winter foods in New York include eastern white pine, red pine (Pinus resinosa), white spruce, paper birch (Petula papyrifera), and aspens. In Ontario, sugar maple (Acer saccharum), striped maple (A. pensylvanicum), red maple, other deciduous species, northern white-cedar (T. occidentalis), balsam fir, beaked hazelnut (C. cornuta), and buffaloberry were heavily barked. In New Brunswick, snowshoe hares consumed northern white-cedar, spruces, American beech (Fagus grandifolia), balsam fir, mountain maple (A. spicatum), and many other species of browse. In Newfoundland, paper birch is preferred. Further details on regional food preferences are summarized in Snowshoe hare and allies:

Snowshoe hares are reported to scavenge for meat in the winter. This behavior may occur in the hare and other herbivores as a response to limited preferred food sources or an overabundance of carrion. Use of carrion as food has also been reported in beavers and the eastern cottontail (Sylvilagus floridanus).

==== Spring, summer and autumn ====
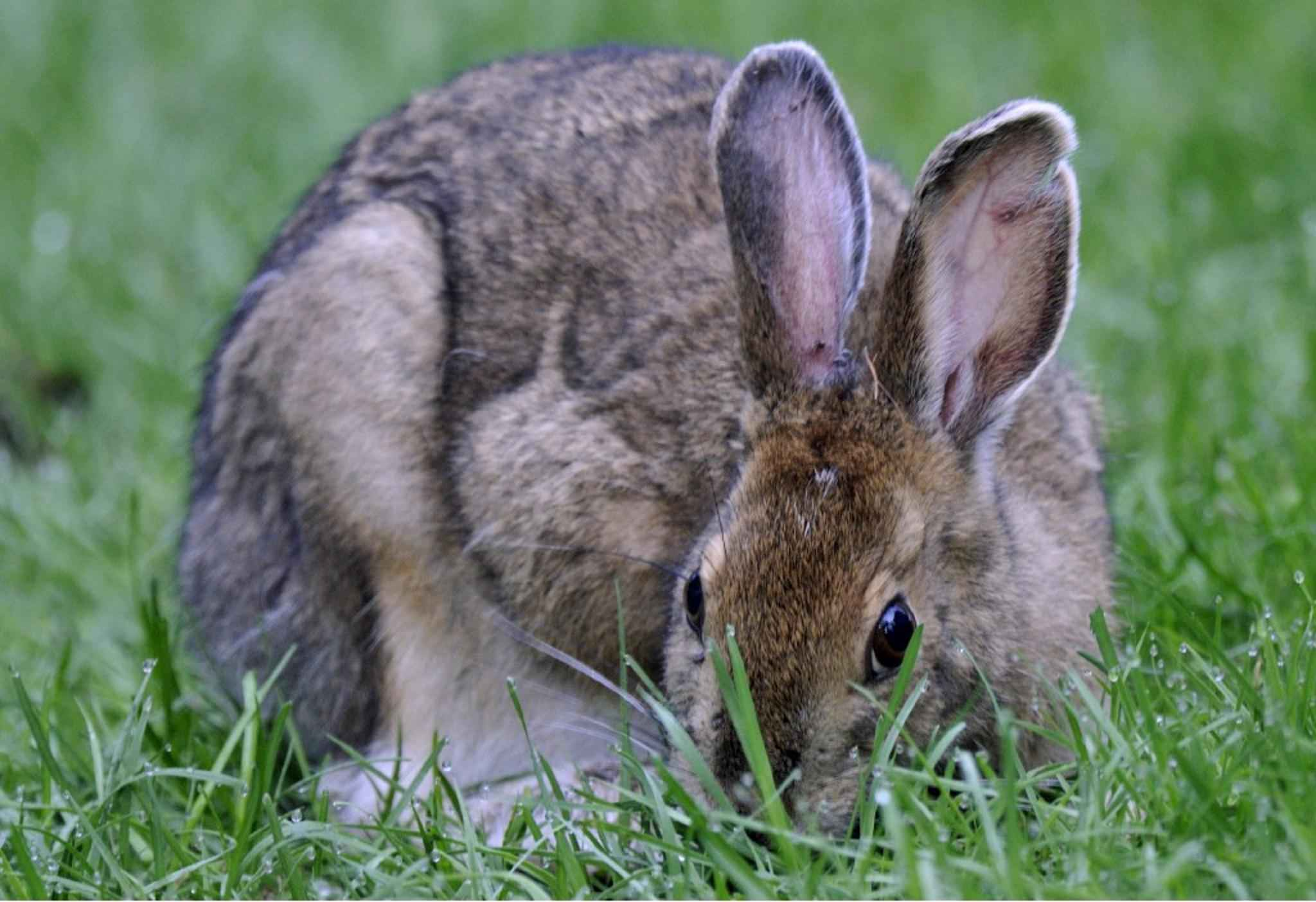
Snowshoe hare eating grass in summer

In Alaska, snowshoe hares consume new leaves of blueberries (Vaccinium spp.), new shoots of field horsetails (Equisetum arvense), and fireweed (Chamaenerion angustifolium) in spring. Grasses are not a major item due to low availability associated with sites that have adequate cover. In summer, leaves of willows, black spruce, birches, and bog Labrador tea (Rhododendron groenlandicum) are also consumed. Black spruce is the most heavily used and the most common species in the area. Pen trials suggest black spruce is not actually preferred. Roses (Rosa spp.) were preferred, but a minor dietary item, as they were not common in the study area. In northwest Oregon, summer foods include grasses, clovers (Trifolium spp.), other forbs, and some woody plants, including Sitka spruce, Douglas-fir, and young leaves and twigs of salal. In Minnesota, aspens, willows, grasses, birches, alders, sumacs, and strawberries are consumed when green. In Ontario, summer diets consist of clovers, grasses, and forbs.

=== Predators ===
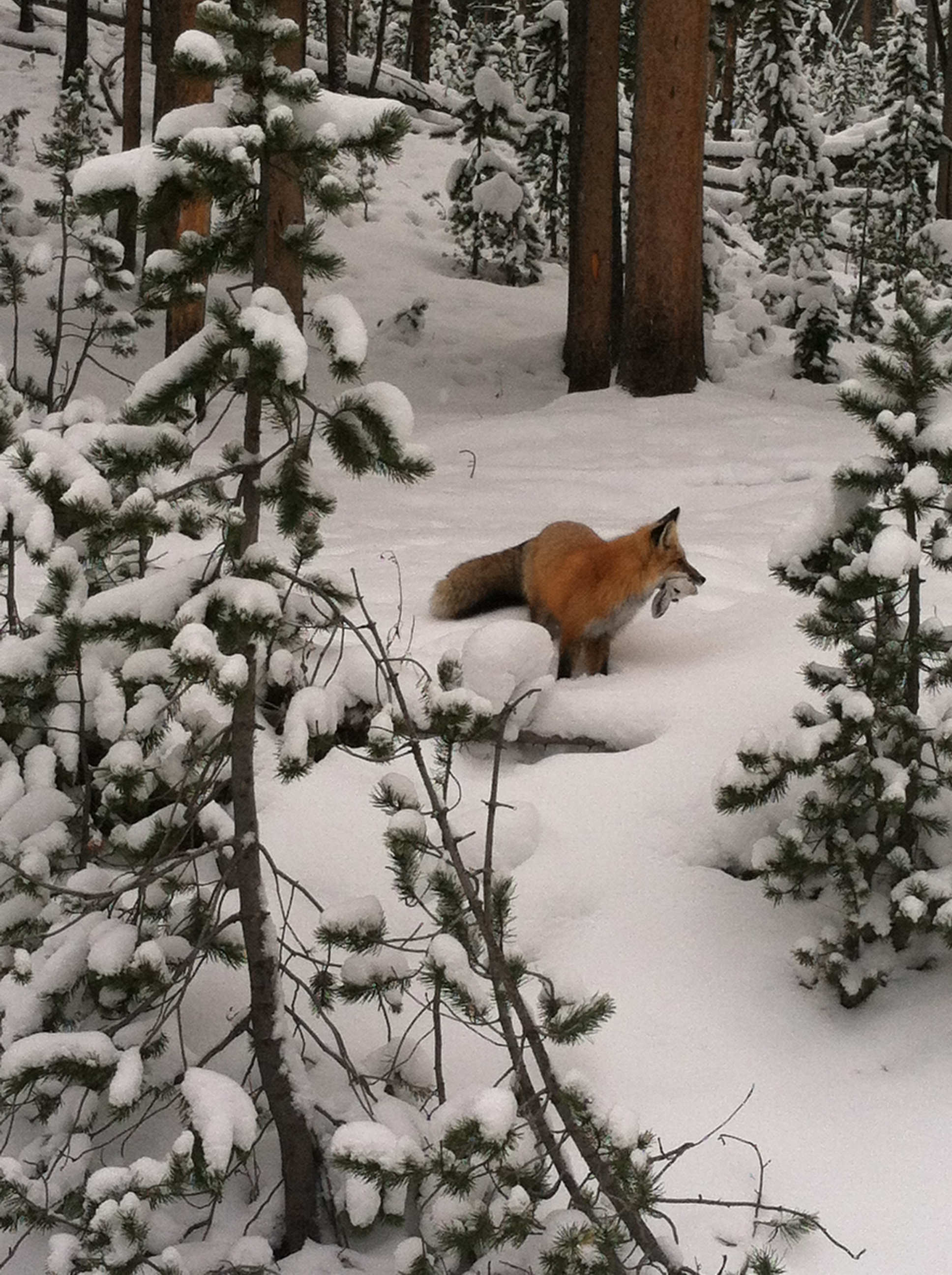
Red fox (Vulpes vulpes) with a snowshoe hare in its mouth

The snowshoe hare is a major prey item for a number of predators. Its foremost predator is the Canada lynx (Lynx canadensis), but other predators include bobcats (L. rufus), fishers (Pekania pennanti), American martens (Martes americana), Pacific martens, (M. caurina), long-tailed weasels (Neogale frenata), minks (N. vison), foxes (Vulpes and Urocyon spp.), coyote (Canis latrans), domestic dogs (C. familiaris), domestic cats (Felis catus), wolves (Canis lupus), cougars (Puma concolor), great horned owls (Bubo virginianus), barred owls (Strix varia), spotted owls (S. occidentalis), other owls, red-tailed hawks (Buteo jamaicensis), American goshawks (Astur atricapillus), other buteonine hawks, golden eagles (Aquila chryseatos), as well as corvids. Other predators include black bears (Ursus americanus). In Glacier National Park, snowshoe hares are a prey item of Rocky Mountain wolves (Canis lupus irremotus).

== Population cycles ==
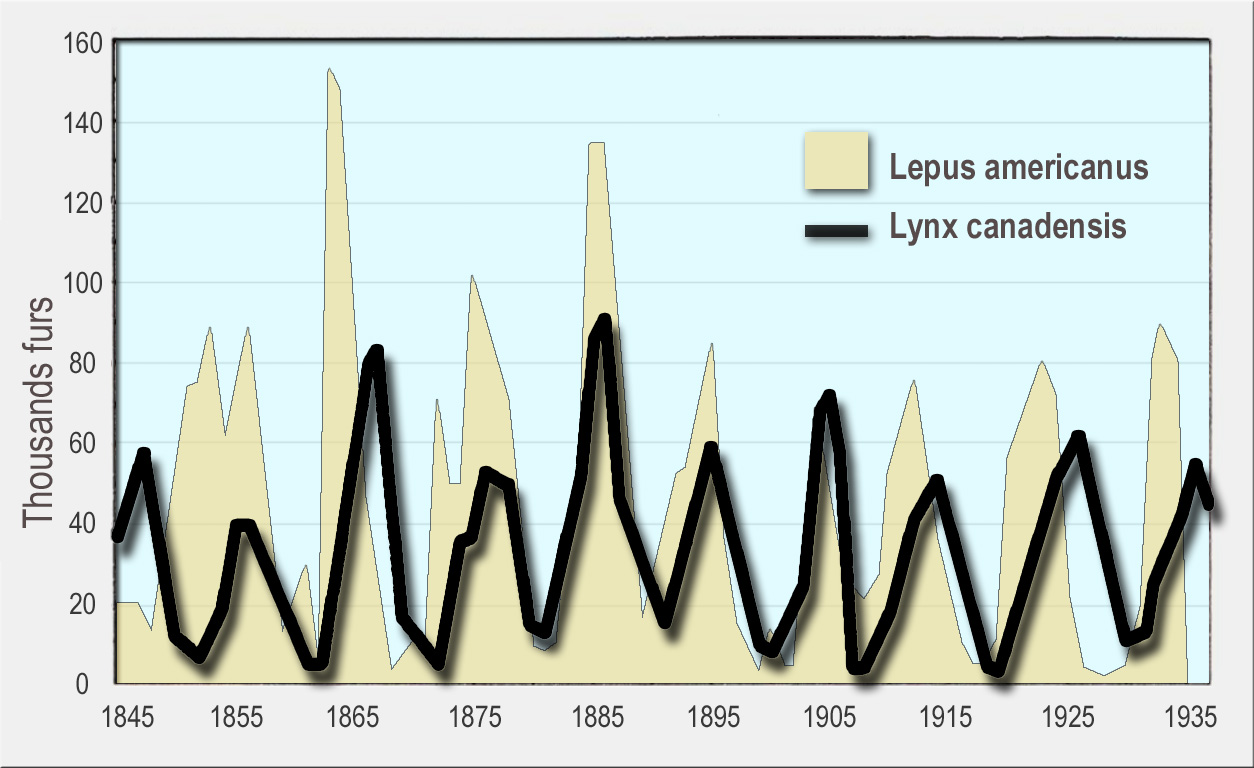
Numbers of snowshoe hare (yellow, background) and Canada lynx (black line, foreground) furs sold to the Hudson's Bay Company. Canada lynx eat snowshoe hares.

Northern populations of snowshoe hares undergo cycles that range from seven to 17 years between population peaks. The average time between peaks is approximately 10 years. The period of abundance usually lasts for two to five years, followed by a population decline to lower numbers or local scarcity. Areas of great abundance tend to be scattered. Populations do not peak simultaneously in all areas, although a great deal of synchronicity occurs in northern latitudes. From 1931 to 1948, the cycle was synchronized within one or two years over most of Canada and Alaska, despite differences in predators and food supplies. In central Alberta, low snowshoe hare density occurred in 1965, with 42 to 74 snowshoe hares per 100 acres (40 ha). The population peak occurred in November 1970 with 2,830 to 5,660 snowshoe hares per 100 acres (40 ha). In the southern parts of its range, snowshoe hare populations do not fluctuate radically.

Exclosure experiments in Alberta indicated browsing by snowshoe hares during population peaks has the greatest impact on palatable species, thus further reducing the amount of available foods. In this study, insufficient nutritious young browse was available to sustain the number of snowshoe hares present in the peak years (1971 and 1972) in winter.

The hare's fluctuating numbers are modelled by the Lotka–Volterra equations.

== Vulnerability to climate change ==
The habitat for some snowshoe hares has changed dramatically, leaving some habitats without snow for longer periods than previously. As an adaptation to decreased snow cover, many snowshoe hares in these habitats stay brown all winter. Others, however, continue to turn white in winter. White hares in snowless habitats are at an increased risk of being hunted and killed because they are no longer camouflaged. Many people in the scientific community believe that snowshoe hare populations are at risk of crashing unless interbreeding speeds up the process of evolution to year-round brown. Other species who rely on the hare as part of their diet are also at risk.
