= Doyle High School =

Coordinates: 30.500986°N 90.744668°W

Location
- 20480 Circle Drive; Livingston, Louisiana 70754; United States

Information
- Type: Public
- School district: Livingston Parish School District
- Principal: Ashley Sharp
- Teaching staff: 42.89 (FTE)
- Grades: 6-12
- Enrollment: 689 (2023-2024)
- Student to teacher ratio: 16.06
- Colors: Purple and gold
- Mascot: Fighting Tiger
- Nickname: Tigers
- Website: www.doylehighschool.net

Doyle High School is a public high school in Livingston, Louisiana, United States. It serves right under 700 students in grades 6–12.

The school's principal is Ashley Sharp. Janet Keller serves as assistant principal and Coach Blane Westmoreland and Casey Moskau are Administrative Assistants.

== Athletics ==
Doyle High athletics competes in the LHSAA. The school's athletic mascot is the Fighting Tiger, and its school colors are purple and gold. They have teams for women's volleyball, basketball, softball, and men's basketball, baseball in all grades.

The 2018 Doyle High Softball team won the Louisiana State Championship.

The 2025 Doyle High Softball team won the Louisiana State Championship in Division III (Non Select).

== Notable alumni ==
- Dale M. Erdey (Class of 1972), state senator from Livingston, Tangipahoa, and East Baton Rouge parishes
