= Mike Branch =

American politician

Louisiana State Senator for District 13 (East Baton Rouge, East Feliciana, and Livingston parishes)
- In office 1996–2000
- Preceded by: Michael "Mike" Cross
- Succeeded by: Heulette Fontenot

Member of the East Baton Rouge Parish School Board (District 11)
- In office 1989–1995
- Preceded by: Gordon Herbert Hutchinson Sr.
- Succeeded by: Jay Devall

Personal details
- Party: Republican
- Parent(s): John and Mary Branch
- Education: Central High School in Baton Rouge; Louisiana State University
- Occupation: Commercial pilot

Military service
- Branch/service: Louisiana Army National Guard

Michael Francis Branch, known as Mike Branch (born 1965), served from 1996 to 2000 as the Louisiana State Senator from District 13 (East Baton Rouge, East Feliciana, and Livingston parishes). Branch unseated incumbent Democratic Senator Mike Cross, a former Mayor of Baker in East Baton Rouge Parish.

== Background ==
An Eagle Scout, Branch graduated from Central High School and Louisiana State University in Baton Rouge, where he procured Bachelor of General Studies and Master of Public Administration degrees. He was a Second Lieutenant in the Louisiana Army National Guard. Prior to his State Senate term, Branch was a member of the East Baton Rouge Parish School Board. He is a commercial pilot.

== Political career ==
In 1990, Branch was elected to the District 11 seat on the 12-member East Baton Rouge Parish School Board. He led in the primary held on October 6, 1990, 4,945 votes (42.4 percent), and went into the general election with the one-term incumbent Democrat Gordon Herbert Hutchinson Sr. (born 1921), who received 4,091 votes (35.1 percent). In the lower-turnout second balloting on November 6, Branch defeated Hutchinson, 4,247 votes (63.4 percent) to 2,448 (36.6 percent). Branch was unopposed for a second four-year school board term in 1994, but he served less than a year thereafter because he resigned from the board to run for the State Senate. Branch was succeeded on the School Board by Jay Devall, winner of an all-Republican special election to complete the remaining three years of the term.

In 1994, Branch was among those honored by the Baton Rouge Business Report in the "Forty Under 40" category. Also cited were future U.S. Senator Mary Landrieu and later U.S. Representative Cleo Fields.

In the primary election for the state Senate seat, held on October 21, 1995, Branch defeated Cross, 23,002 (53.5 percent) to 20,002 (46.5 percent), an exact 3,000-vote margin. Branch did not seek reelection in the nonpartisan blanket primary in 1999 and was succeeded by Heulette Fontenot. In the Senate, Branch served on the Commerce & Consumer Protection, Education, Judiciary B, and Retirement committees. He was the Vice Chairman of the Education Committee.

Political offices
Preceded by Mike Cross	Louisiana State Senator for District 13 (East Feliciana, East Baton Rouge, and Livingston parishes); 1996–2000	Succeeded by Heulette Fontenot
Preceded by Gordon Herbert Hutchinson Sr.	Member of the East Baton Rouge Parish School Board; 1991–1995	Succeeded by Jay Devall
