= Livingston, Louisiana =

- Town
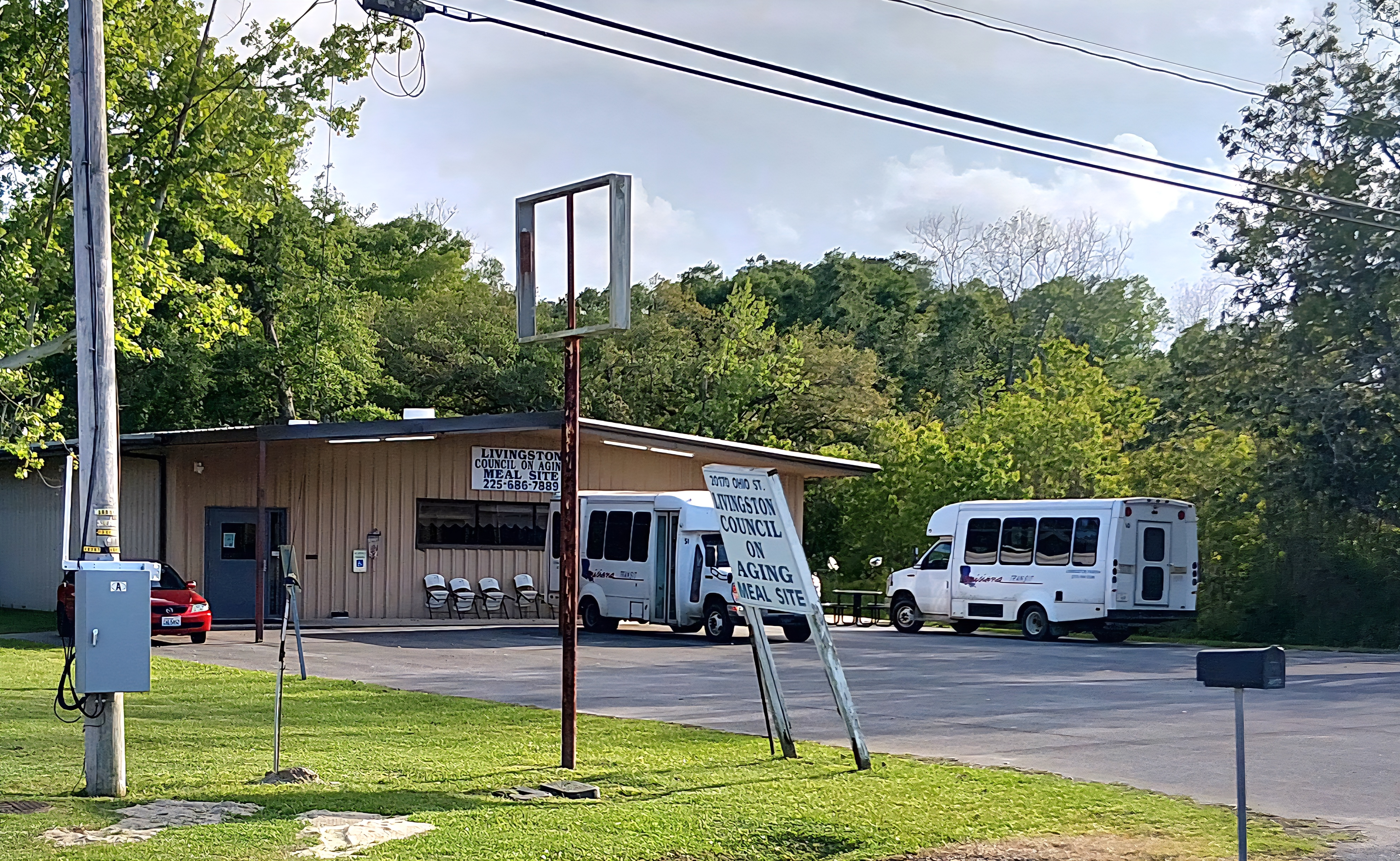
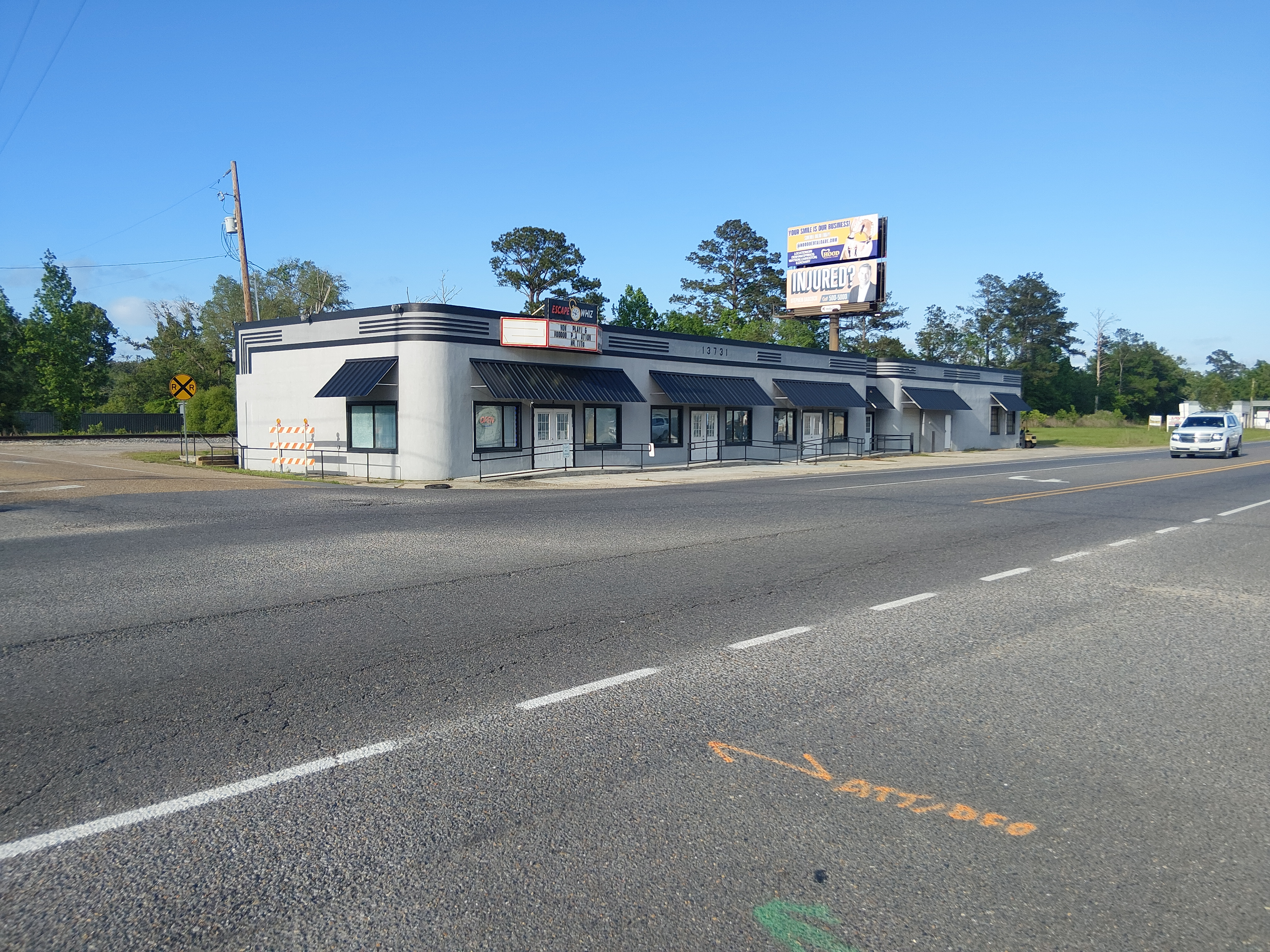
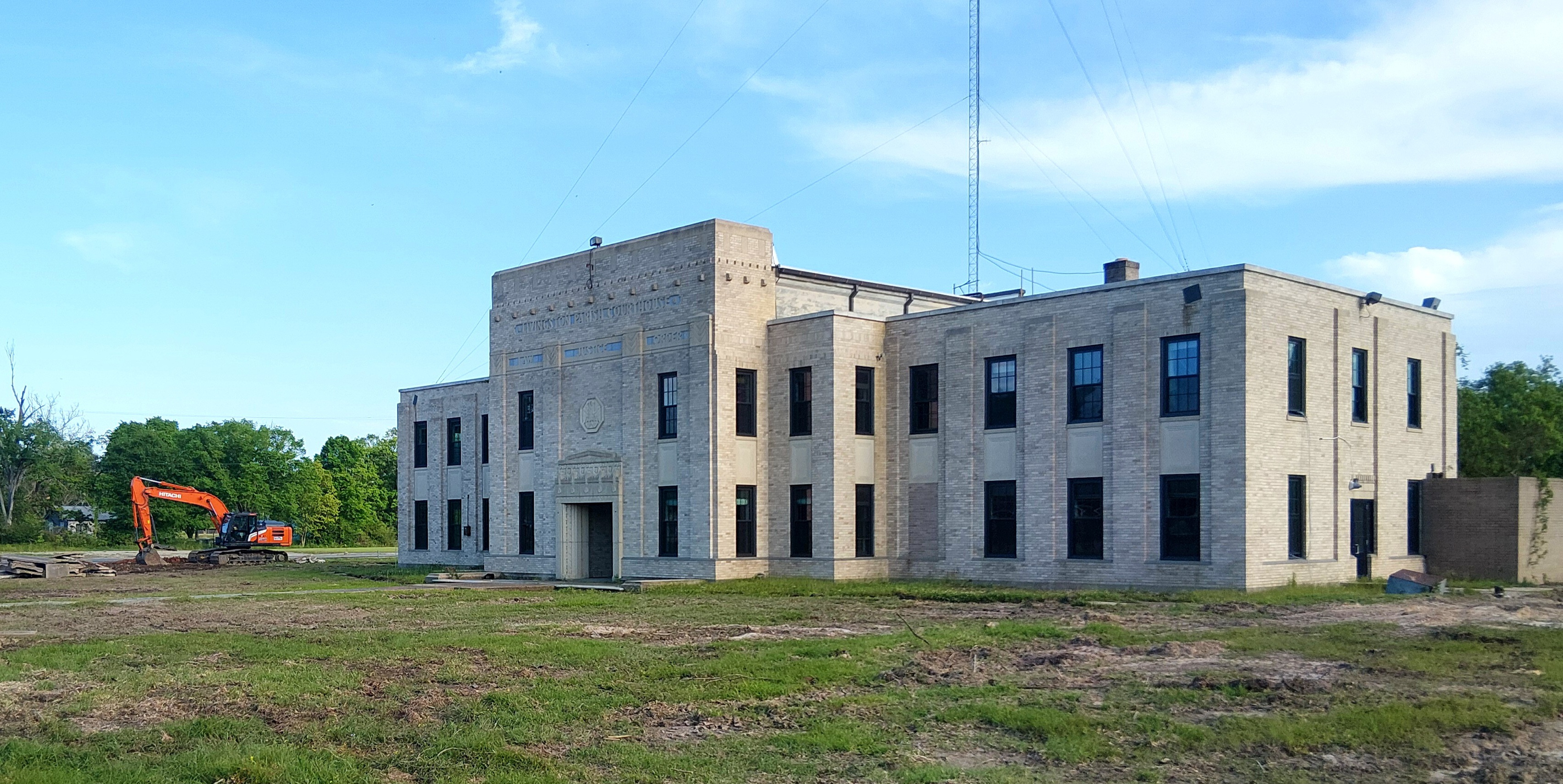
- Council on Aging US 190 at LA hwy 63 Old Livingston Parish Courthouse
- Interactive map of Livingston, Louisiana
- Location within Louisiana Location within the United States
- Coordinates: 30°29′55″N 90°44′54″W
- Country: United States
- State: Louisiana
- Parish: Livingston
- Established: 1918

Government
  - Mayor: Jonathan "JT" Taylor (Elected 2021)
  - Mayor Pro Tem: Robert "BJ" Stewart (Elected 2021)

Area
  - Total: 3.22 sq mi (8.35 km^{2})
  - Land: 3.22 sq mi (8.35 km^{2})
  - Water: 0 sq mi (0.00 km^{2})
- Elevation: 43 ft (13 m)

Population (2020)
  - Total: 1,877
  - Density: 582.4/sq mi (224.86/km^{2})
- Time zone: UTC-6 (CST)
  - Summer (DST): UTC-5 (CDT)
- ZIP Code: 70754
- Area code: 225
- FIPS code: 22-44655
- Website: https://www.townoflivingston.com/

Livingston is a town in and the parish seat of Livingston Parish, Louisiana, United States. The population was 1,877 as of the 2020 census.

Livingston hosts one of the two LIGO gravitational wave detector sites, the other being located in Hanford, Washington.

== History ==
Like the parish, Livingston takes its name from the jurist Edward Livingston.

Livingston was the site of a major train derailment (spilling about 200,000 gallons of chemicals) in 1982.

On February 11, 2016, it was officially announced that the LIGO collaboration successfully made the first direct observation of gravitational waves in September 2015. Barry Barish, Kip Thorne and Rainer Weiss were awarded the 2017 Nobel Prize in Physics for leading this work. The communities of Doyle and Livingston combined in 1955 to create the Town of Livingston. Doyle was established northeast of present-day Livingston in the late 1800's, located on Hog Branch, off present-day North Doyle Road but moved when the railroad was built from Baton Rouge to Hammond, and the community was re-located in 1901 by the McDonald family.

Livingston originated as a company town established by the Lyon Lumber Company during its expansion into the pine forests of Livingston Parish following the conversion of its Garyville mill from cypress to pine production in 1915. To support these new operations, the company extended its logging railroad northward and established Livingston as the northern terminus of the Garyville Northern Railroad. The railroad was incorporated in 1915 and entered service on October 8, 1917, carrying lumber, freight, passengers, and U.S. mail between Livingston and Garyville.

When Livingston was first established, there was a house on every lot, a boardwalk in front of every home, and water wells drilled on each corner so every home would have access to running water. Today, the Catholic Church and less than a dozen homes built by the Lyons Lumber Company are all that is left of the era. During its heyday, there were about 200 homes, and a town square where the present Old Courthouse sits today. All the businesses faced the town square, with all those lots measuring 25 ft wide except the corner lots which were 33 ft. Big Store #2 was on the northwest corner where the present day County Agents office is located and a hotel on the southwest corner where the Old First Baptist Church Parsonage is located. There was a sweet shop, hotel, butcher shop, grocery, barber shop, and other businesses located around the square. There was a black settlement on the opposite side of the Garyville Northern Railroad where the present day Post Office is today with hundreds of workers living there (No records of how many shanty shacks were located there.) and a wheel house to turn the train around where the present day Louisiana Dept of Highway has a maintenance warehouse. There was a huge flow well located there to refill the steam engines. It flowed all the time until sometime in the 1960s, the town, parish or the state capped it off.

When the Lyons Lumber Company sold out in the early 1930s, they sold everything; even the Catholic church in Livingston was sold. Julis Smith, Doctor Tomm, and Mr Tidwell purchased all the holdings, donating the Catholic Church back to the people of Livingston. Mr Stebins, who was the manager of the Lyons Lumber Company Mill at the time, purchased the Town of Garyville, the timber mill, as well as the Garyville Northern Railroad. At some point during the beginning of WW II after America entered the war, he pulled up all the metal rails and sold them for scrap metal and paid off his debt on everything he purchased. Today, the Garyville Northern as the old time locals call it, is now the road bed for Hwy 63 South; however, the road only runs between the Town of Livingston and the community of Verdun; it no longer goes all the way to the Mississippi River where the Town of Garyville is located.

When the Lyons Lumber Company sold out in Livingston, most of the workers moved away. Some had purchased homes, but most were just renting. Most of the homes were torn down because the value of the cypress lumber was worth more than the home itself. Over the past 100-plus years, we have lost most of the buildings built by the Lyons Lumber Company; however, the Town has survived and is growing.

== Geography ==
Livingston is located at 30°29′55″N 90°44′54″W (30.498721, -90.748371).

According to the United States Census Bureau, the town has a total area of 3.1 square miles (8.0 km^{2}), all land. The communities of Doyle and Livingston combined in 1955 to create the Town of Livingston. Doyle was established northeast of present-day Livingston, located on Hog Branch, off present-day North Doyle Road but moved when the railroad was built from Baton Rouge to Hammond, and the community was re-located in 1908 by the McDonald family.

== Demographics ==
Historical population
| Census | Pop. | Note | %± |
|---|---|---|---|
| 1960 | 1,183 | | — |
| 1970 | 1,398 | | 18.2% |
| 1980 | 1,260 | | −9.9% |
| 1990 | 999 | | −20.7% |
| 2000 | 1,342 | | 34.3% |
| 2010 | 1,769 | | 31.8% |
| 2020 | 1,877 | | 6.1% |
| 2025 (est.) | 2,006 | ▲ | 6.9% |
U.S. Decennial Census

Livingston racial composition as of 2020
| Race | Number | Percentage |
|---|---|---|
| White (non-Hispanic) | 1,712 | 91.21% |
| Black or African American (non-Hispanic) | 44 | 2.34% |
| Native American | 5 | 0.27% |
| Asian | 1 | 0.05% |
| Other/Mixed | 61 | 3.25% |
| Hispanic or Latino | 54 | 2.88% |

As of the 2020 United States census, there were 1,877 people, 679 households, and 492 families residing in the town.

As of the census of 2000, there were 1,342 people, 539 households, and 377 families residing in the town. The population density was 429.8 inhabitants per square mile (165.9/km^{2}). There were 581 housing units at an average density of 186.1 per square mile (71.9/km^{2}). The racial makeup of the town was 96.05% White, 2.98% African American, 0.07% Native American, 0.22% Asian, and 0.67% from two or more races. Hispanic or Latino of any race were 0.52% of the population.

There were 539 households, out of which 34.3% had children under the age of 18 living with them, 49.9% were married couples living together, 15.0% had a female householder with no husband present, and 29.9% were non-families. 25.6% of all households were made up of individuals, and 11.9% had someone living alone who was 65 years of age or older. The average household size was 2.49 and the average family size was 3.00.

In the town, the population was spread out, with 26.1% under the age of 18, 11.2% from 18 to 24, 27.0% from 25 to 44, 23.9% from 45 to 64, and 11.8% who were 65 years of age or older. The median age was 35 years. For every 100 females, there were 95.3 males. For every 100 females age 18 and over, there were 87.9 males.

The median income for a household in the town was $32,813, and the median income for a family was $41,625. Males had a median income of $33,958 versus $20,795 for females. The per capita income for the town was $15,075. About 10.9% of families and 12.9% of the population were below the poverty line, including 7.7% of those under age 18 and 21.4% of those age 65 or over.

== Education ==
Livingston is within the Livingston Parish Public Schools system.

The following schools serve the Town of Livingston and the local area:

- Doyle Elementary School
- Doyle High School
- Frost Elementary (South of the Town of Livingston, serving the Frost Community)

== Notable people ==
- Dale M. Erdey, current state senator from Livingston Parish and former mayor of Livingston. His father was also a mayor of Livingston.
- Heulette Fontenot, former state representative and state senator from Livingston Parish
- Gabriela González, spokesperson for the LIGO Scientific Collaboration
- Laine Hardy, American Idol contestant 2018; American Idol winner 2019
