= Valarie Hodges =

American politician in Louisiana (born 1955)

Valarie Dawn Hope Hodges

Member of the Louisiana Senate from the 13th district
- Incumbent
- Assumed office January 8, 2024
- Preceded by: J. Rogers Pope

Member of the Louisiana House of Representatives from the 64th district
- In office January 9, 2012 – January 8, 2024
- Preceded by: Bodi White
- Succeeded by: Kellee Hennessy Dickerson

Personal details
- Born: March 12, 1955 (age 71)
- Party: Republican
- Education: Central High School
- Occupation: Politician, businessperson

Valarie Dawn Hope Hodges (born March 12, 1955) is a politician and businessperson from Denham Springs, Louisiana. She is a member of the Republican Party and represented the 64th state House district of the Louisiana House of Representatives which includes the rural portions of northwest Livingston Parish and northeast East Baton Rouge parish including the areas of Pride and Watson from January 2012 to January 2024. On January 8, 2024, she assumed her role in the Louisiana State Senate where she represents the constituents of the 13th district which largely encompasses Livingston Parish north of Interstate 12.

== Personal life ==
Hodges met her future husband, Leland M. Hodges, while they were both students at Central High School. The two married in 1972 at Amite Baptist Church in Watson. The couple has three children, six grandchildren, and they jointly own and operate two small businesses.

Hodges served as a missionary with her husband for 18 years. Through their work, they established an international ministry that operates churches in Nicaragua and Guadalajara, Mexico. Hodges claims that their international experiences led her to a life of public office through her interactions with "the poverty that accompanies socialistic societies such as Cuba and Mexico."

== Political career and controversy ==
Hodges was first elected in 2011 to succeed term-limited Representative Bodi White, who was elected to the revamped District 6 seat in the Louisiana State Senate to succeed Julie Quinn. In the 2011 election, Hodges defeated fellow Republican Barry Elkins in the primary election held on October 22, 2011, by receiving over 69 percent of the vote. Hodges election came with the support of the Tea Party movement and former politicians David Vitter and Bobby Jindal.

Hodges first term was characterized by the creation of the Comite River Diversion Canal Project Task Force in 2014. The Task Force sought to study and make recommendations to ensure the completion of the Comite River Diversion Canal project. The Comite River runs through East Baton Rouge Parish where it meets the Amite River south of Denham Springs. The 12-mile Diversion Canal seeks to cut through neighborhoods in north, East Baton Rouge parish to join the Comite River to the Mississippi River to alleviate flooding concerns for residents in Livingston Parish who built their homes in a floodplain. The project has been discussed since the mid-1900s and has been ensnarled by delays ever since.

Despite Hodges's commitment to local infrastructure projects, Hodges political career has also been mixed with far-right extremism. Hodges was an early supporter of the school choice movement involving the creation of a school voucher program to send public school students to private schools for free. Hodges's support persisted for the issue despite questions over the accountability of Louisiana's private school system. However, Hodges quickly withdrew her support on the issue when she learned that parents could use a voucher to send their child to a private, Muslim school. Hodges claimed that such an action by parents would be against the Founding Father's religion despite the fact there is no evidence supporting the claim that these men all followed the same religion or were even all Christian. Nonetheless, the school voucher expansion program ultimately passed the legislature and was signed by then Governor Jindal.

Following the 2015 elections, Louisiana faced its worst budgetary crisis in state history as a result of the fiscal policies enacted by Governor Jindal. The state faced a budgetary shortfall totaling nearly three billion dollars in John Bel Edwards's first two years as governor, putting higher education and healthcare in the political crosshairs. The situation was so dire that public universities throughout the state considered declaring financial exigency to absolve them of the problems. Even before this, Louisiana State University was considering cutting over 1,000 classes to survive. Despite the seriousness of the situation, Hodges advocated a policy position that was in direct conflict with the State Office on Budget and Planning.

When the COVID-19 pandemic took hold across the United States in early 2020, Hodges was a staunch opponent to stay-at-home orders meant to curb the spread of the disease. Hodges also elevated pseudoscientific claims that hydroxychloroquine and ivermectin were effective treatments for the disease. In legislative sessions since the onset of the pandemic, Hodges has also been a part of a group legislators pushing for anti-science and anti-vaccine legislation.

Despite her controversies, Hodges is one of the eight members of the executive committee of the Republican State Executive Committee. Hodges is also a founding member of the Conservative Caucus. She previously served as president of the Livingston Parish Republican Women's Club.

In February 2023, Hodges announced her intentions to run for the 13th Senate District of the Louisiana State Senate. Fellow representative Buddy Mincey also announced his intention to run for the seat being vacated by incumbent J. Rogers Pope. Hodges defeated Mincey and won the seat, securing 65 percent of the vote in the jungle primary election.

In 2024, Hodges sponsored a bill to forbid public schools from teaching that students endure or cause oppression due to their race or national origin.

For Super Bowl 2025, Hodges claimed that a letter she sent the NFL, Jay Cicero, and the New Orleans Sports Foundation resulted in a family-friendly halftime show. She thanked performer Kendrick Lamar for refraining from using profanity during the show.

Louisiana State Senate
Preceded by J. Rogers Pope	Louisiana State Senator from District 13; 2024	Succeeded by Incumbent
Louisiana House of Representatives
Preceded by Bodi White	Louisiana State Representative from District 64 (Livingston and East Baton Rouge parishes); 2012–2024	Succeeded by Kellee Hennessy Dickerson
