= Dale M. Erdey =

American politician (born 1954)

Dale Michael Erdey

Louisiana State Senator for District 13 (Livingston, Tangipahoa, and East Baton Rouge parishes)
- In office 2008–2020
- Preceded by: Heulette Fontenot
- Succeeded by: J. Rogers Pope

Louisiana State Representative for District 71 (Livingston Parish)
- In office 2000–2008
- Preceded by: Heulette Fontenot
- Succeeded by: J. Rogers Pope

Personal details
- Born: December 6, 1954 (age 71) Hammond, Tangipahoa Parish, Louisiana, USA
- Party: Republican
- Children: Lindsey E. McCaskill; Ashlyn E. McMorris
- Education: Doyle High School; Louisiana State University
- Occupation: Real estate; Insurance agent; Politician

Dale M. Erdey (born December 6, 1954) is a former Louisiana State Senator. He represented District 13 for 12 years, 2008–2020. Prior to that he was a member of the Louisiana House of Representatives from 1999 to 2007. Born in Hammond, Louisiana, Erdey graduated from Doyle High School and earned a B.S. at Louisiana State University.

Louisiana State Senate
Preceded by Heulette Fontenot	Louisiana State Senator for District 13 (Livingston, Tangipahoa, and East Baton Rouge parishes); Dale Michael Erdey; 2008–2020	Succeeded by J. Rogers Pope
Louisiana House of Representatives
Preceded by Heulette Fontenot	Louisiana State Representative for District 71 (Livingston Parish); Dale Michael Erdey; 2000–2008	Succeeded by J. Rogers Pope
