= J. Rogers Pope =

American politician

Member of the Louisiana Senate from the 13th district
- In office January 13, 2020 – January 8, 2024
- Preceded by: Dale Erdey
- Succeeded by: Valarie Hodges

Member of the Louisiana House of Representatives from the 71st district
- In office 2008–2020
- Succeeded by: Buddy Mincey Jr.

Personal details
- Born: 1940 or 1941 (age 84–85)
- Party: Republican
- Spouse: Pat
- Children: 2
- Education: Southeastern Louisiana University (BA)

J. Rogers Pope (born 1940 or 1941) is an American politician from the state of Louisiana. A Republican, Pope represented the 13th district of the Louisiana State Senate, covering parts of Livingston Parish, from 2020 to 2024. Pope formerly represented the 71st district of the Louisiana House of Representatives from 2008 until 2020.

== Career ==
Pope is a former Livingston Parish Schools Superintendent, and continues to serve as the Executive Director of the Louisiana Association of School Executives. Pope won election to the Louisiana House of Representatives for the 71st district in 2007, narrowly defeating fellow Republican John Ware. He was re-elected unopposed in 2011 and 2015.

When he was term-limited from the House of Representatives in 2019, Pope ran instead for the 13th district of the Louisiana State Senate. He was elected in the first round with an outright majority of 50.4%, defeating fellow Republicans Edith Carlin and Deven Cavalier. Pope assumed his Senate seat in 2020.

== Personal life ==
Pope lives in Denham Springs with his wife, Pat. They have two children and six grandchildren.
