= Heulette Fontenot =

American politician (1961–2019)

Heulette Clovance "Clo" Fontenot, Jr.

Louisiana State Representative for District 71 (Livingston Parish)
- In office 1996–2000
- Preceded by: Bernard E. Carrier
- Succeeded by: Dale M. Erdey

Louisiana State Senator for District 13 (Livingston and East Baton Rouge parishes)
- In office 2000–2008
- Preceded by: Mike Branch
- Succeeded by: Dale M. Erdey

Personal details
- Born: July 14, 1961
- Died: September 29, 2019
- Party: Republican
- Education: Louisiana State University
- Occupation: Operations supervisor for Exxon

Heulette Clovance Fontenot Jr., known as Clo Fontenot (July 14, 1961 – September 29, 2019), was a Louisiana businessman and politician who served as a Republican in both houses of the Louisiana State Legislature. While in office, Fontenot authored legislation protecting pets during emergency evacuations.

Fontenot received a B.S. from Louisiana State University, and served in municipal government for a time before winning election to state government. Fontenot was a presidential elector for George W. Bush and Dick Cheney in the 2000 United States presidential election. Fontenot declined to run for reelection in 2007 due to other employment commitments.

Political offices
Preceded by Mike Branch	Louisiana State Senator from District 13 (Livingston and East Baton Rouge parishes); Heulette Clovance "Clo" Fontenot, Jr. 2000–2008	Succeeded by Dale M. Erdey
Preceded by Bernard E. Carrier	Louisiana State Representative from District 71 (Livingston Parish); Heulette Clovance "Clo" Fontenot, Jr. 1996–2000	Succeeded by Dale M. Erdey
