= Roger William Wilder III =

American politician

Member of the Louisiana House of Representatives from the 71st district
- Incumbent
- Assumed office January 8, 2024
- Preceded by: Buddy Mincey Jr.

Personal details
- Party: Republican

Roger William Wilder III is an American politician serving as a member of the Louisiana House of Representatives from the 71st district. A member of the Republican Party, Wilder represents parts of Livingston Parish and has been in office since January 8, 2024.
