= Buddy Mincey Jr. =

American Politician

Member of the Louisiana House of Representatives from the 71st district
- In office January 13, 2020 – January 8, 2024
- Preceded by: J. Rogers Pope
- Succeeded by: Roger William Wilder, III

Personal details
- Born: Denham Springs, Louisiana, U.S.
- Party: Republican (since 2014)
- Other political affiliations: Democratic (2006–2014)
- Children: 3
- Education: Southeastern Louisiana University (BS)

Buddy Mincey Jr. was an American politician serving as a member of the Louisiana House of Representatives for the 71st district. He served from January 13, 2020 to January 8, 2024.

== Early life and education ==
Born in Denham Springs, Louisiana, Mincey graduated from Denham Springs High School in 1987. He earned a Bachelor of Science degree in industrial technology from Southeastern Louisiana University in 1993.

== Career ==
Outside of politics, Mincey worked as a project manager at ELOS Environmental. He was elected to the Livingston Parish School Board in 2006. Mincey was elected to the Louisiana House of Representatives in November 2019 and assumed office on January 13, 2020. He lost the Jungle primary on October 14, 2023 to Roger William Wilder, III.
