= Shirleys Bay =

Bay of the Ottawa river in Ontario, Canada

Coordinates: 45°22′30″N 75°53′52″W

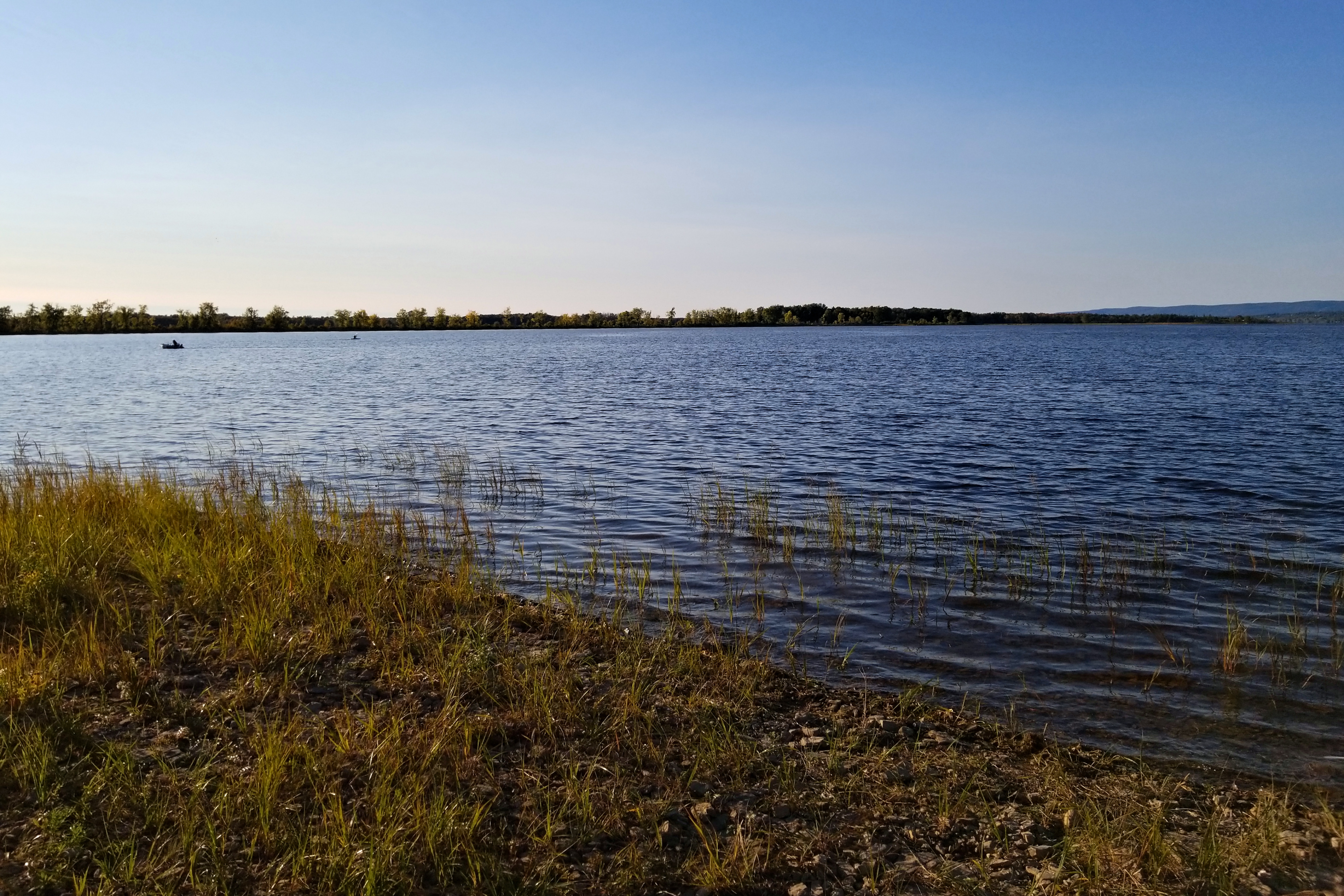
Shirleys Bay

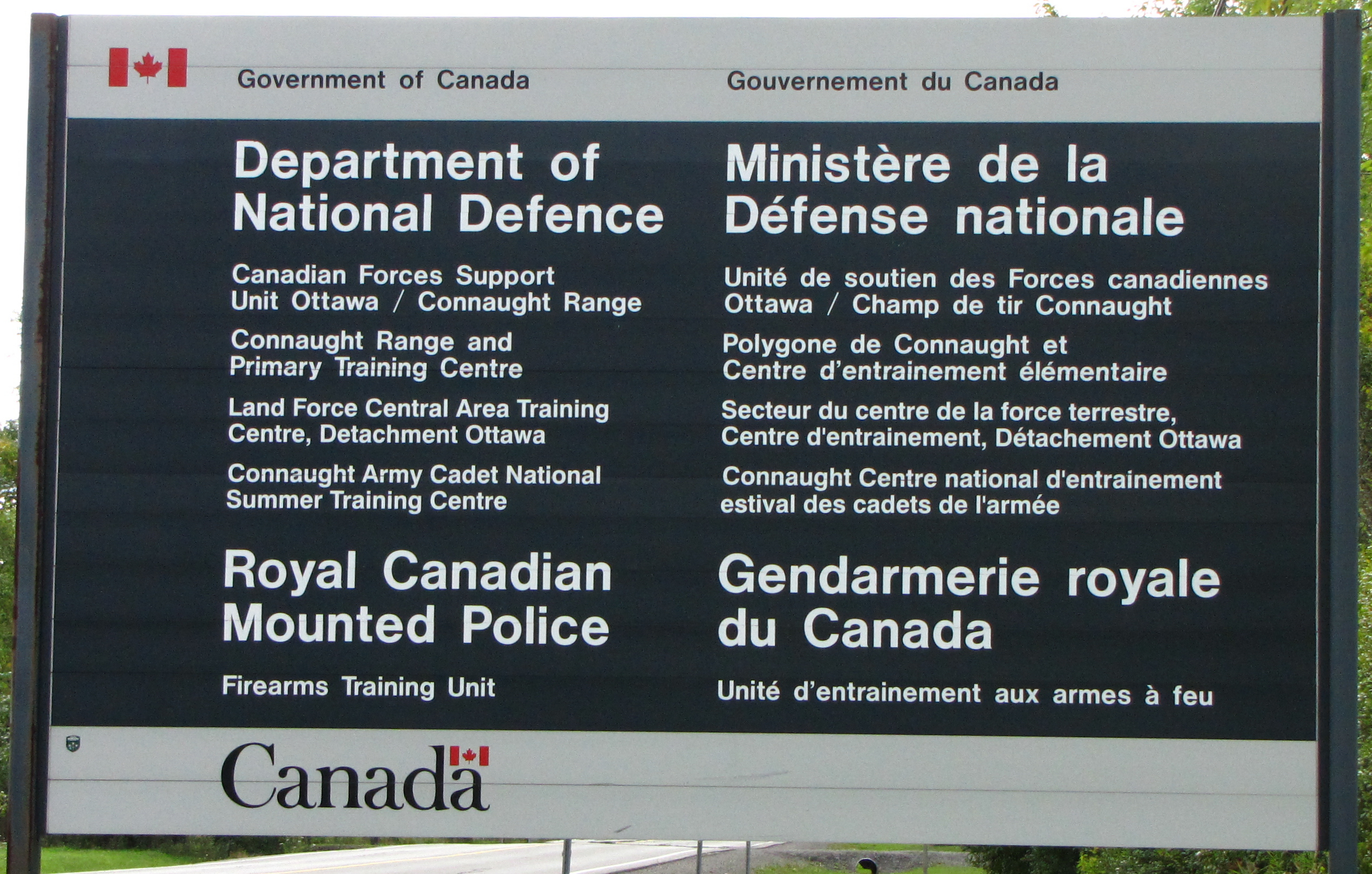
Sign at entrance to restricted area

Shirleys Bay is a bay of the Ottawa River, about sixteen kilometres (9.9 miles) from downtown Ottawa in Ontario, Canada. Shirleys Bay also includes a significant wetland and nature preserve that is part of an Important Bird and Biodiversity Area the Lac Deschênes-Ottawa River IBA.

It is also the name of a Canadian military and civilian telecommunication research campus that is located on the shore of the bay. Organizations with facilities at the site include Defence Research and Development Canada, Communications Research Centre, the Canadian Space Agency's David Florida Laboratory, Royal Canadian Mounted Police Firearms Training Unit, Department of Defence firearms training area, and the Connaught National Army Cadet Summer Training Centre. In October 1952, the Canadian government set up an observatory at the site to attempt to measure magnetic or radio noise disturbances. The area includes the Innis Point Bird Observatory and the Shirley's Bay Crown Game Preserve, which is managed by the Ottawa Duck Club.

== Project Magnet ==
Project Magnet was an unidentified flying object (UFO) study program established by the Department of Transport (DOT) on 2 December 1950, under the direction of Wilbert Brockhouse Smith, senior radio engineer for the DOT's Broadcast and Measurements Section. It was formally active until mid-1954, and informally until Smith's death in 1962.

The project involved a station at Shirleys Bay equipped with radio monitoring equipment, Geiger counters, and cameras. It allegedly recorded a suspicious signal on 8 August 1954, which some presume was from a UFO. Although no pictures were made because of fog, all further results were declared secret.

== See also ==
- Greenbelt (Ottawa)
