= Dominion Observatory =

Observatory in Ottawa, Canada

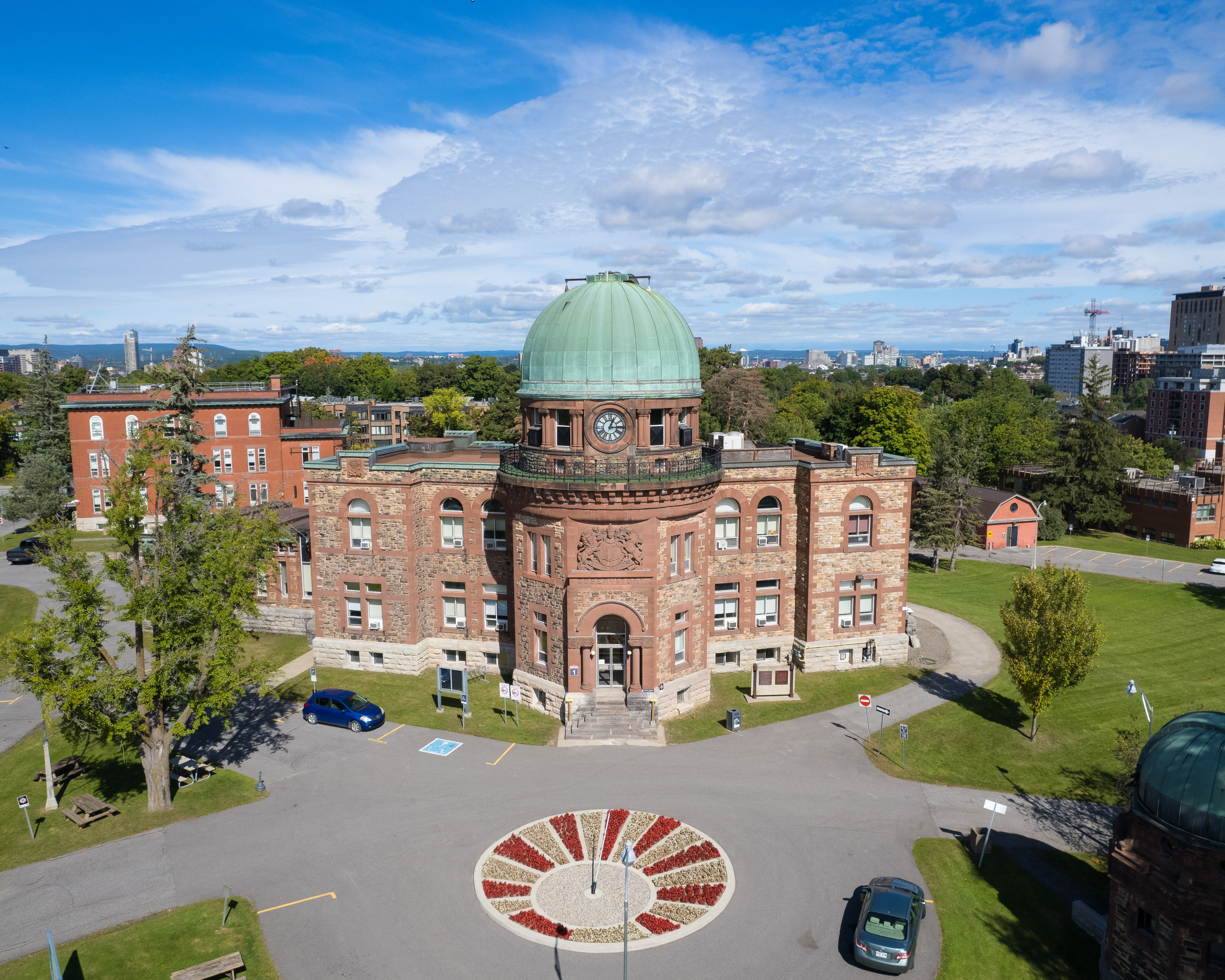
- The Dominion Observatory building in 2022
- Organization: Government of Canada
- Observatory code: 790
- Location: Central Experimental Farm, Ottawa, Ontario, Canada
- Coordinates: 45.393591°N 75.714329°W
- Established: 1902–1905
- Closed: 1970 (as observatory)

Telescopes
- 15-inch refractor: Refracting telescope (largest installed in Canada at the time)
- Location of Dominion Observatory
- Related media on Commons

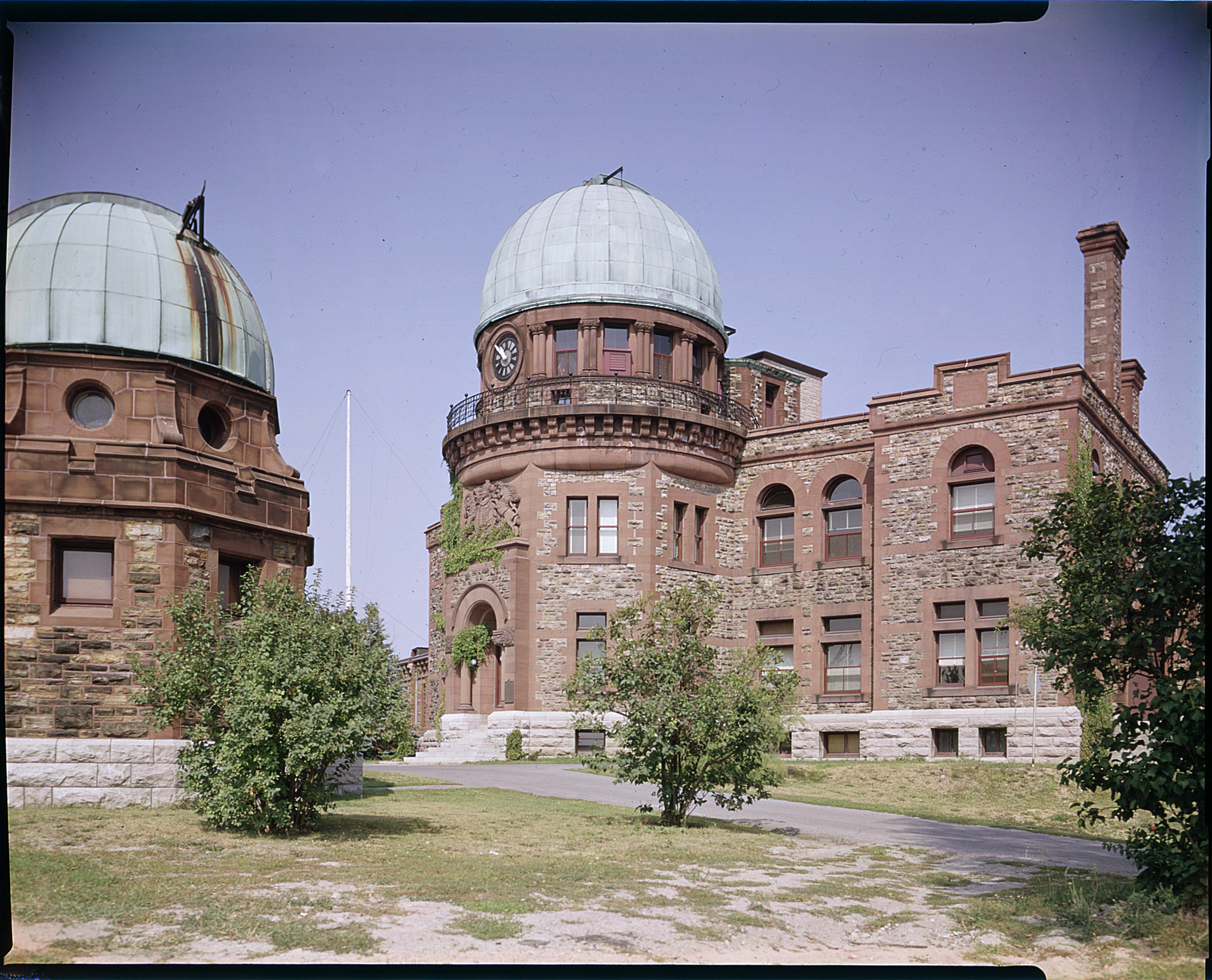
The Dominion Observatory building in 1960

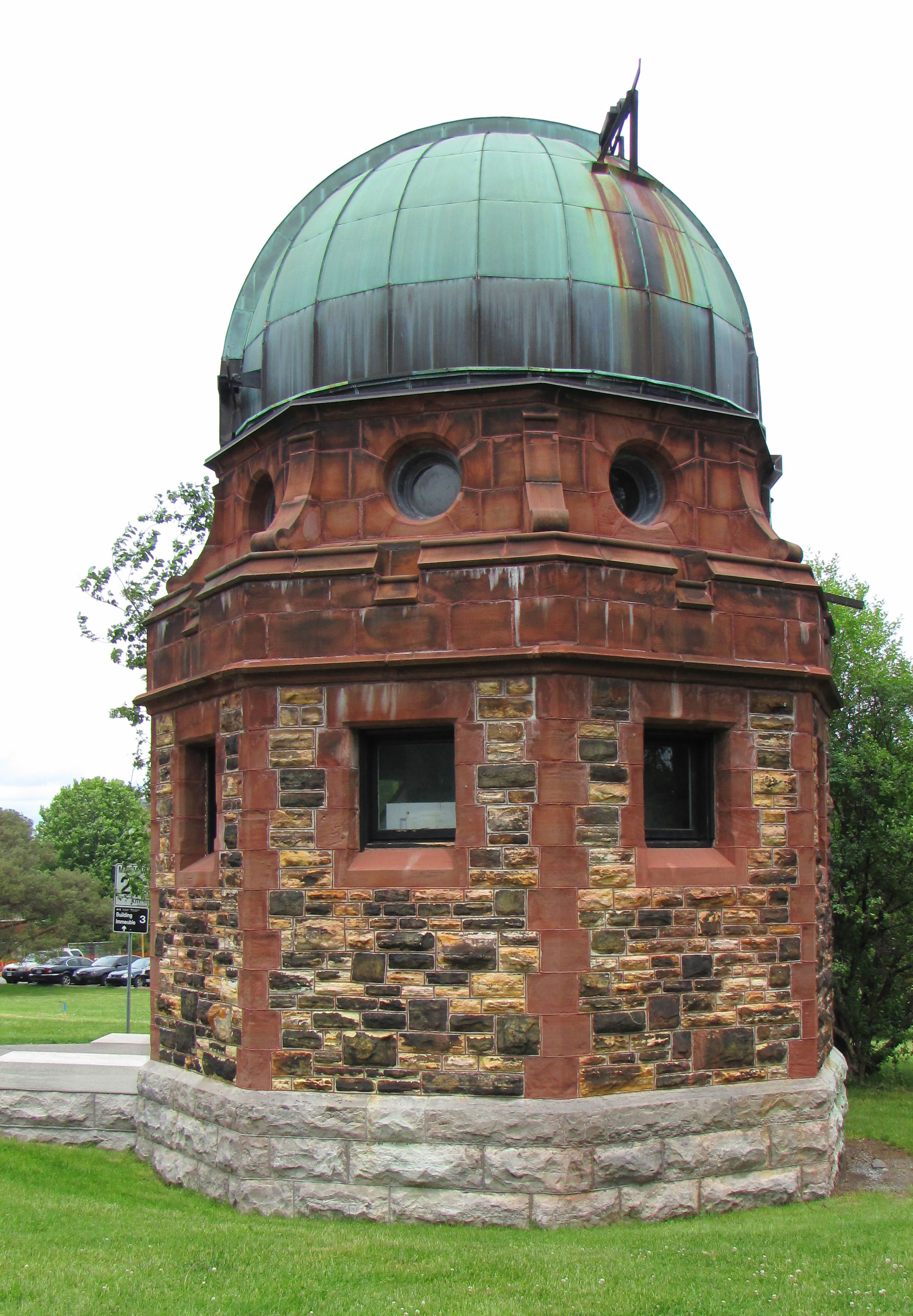
Photo Equatorial Building in front of the main building

The Dominion Observatory was an astronomical observatory and federal scientific institution in Ottawa, Ontario. It operated from 1902 until 1970 and played a central role in astronomy, timekeeping, geophysics, and surveying in Canada. The main building, designed by Chief Dominion Architect David Ewart, was constructed on the Central Experimental Farm between 1902 and 1905 in the Romanesque Revival style.

== History ==
The observatory grew out of the Department of the Interior’s need for precise coordinates and national timekeeping, which at the turn of the 20th century required astronomical observation. It succeeded a smaller Ottawa River observatory and was envisioned as Canada’s counterpart to the Royal Greenwich Observatory in Britain.

The main instrument was a 15-inch refracting telescope, the largest refractor ever installed in Canada, although modest compared to international instruments of the period. While astronomy was central to its mandate, the observatory also became Canada’s leading institution in geophysics. It operated the national seismometer network and undertook stellar surveys essential to Canadian geodesy and mapping.

In 1917 the opening of the Dominion Astrophysical Observatory in Victoria shifted Canadian astronomical leadership toward astrophysics, but the Ottawa observatory remained important as the source of the official Canadian time signal. By 1930, its master clock transmitted signals to about 700 clocks across Ottawa, and in 1941 it became Canada’s national supplier of time signals.

== Reorganization and closure ==
The Dominion Observatory continued to function until 1970, when federal science institutions were reorganized. Astronomical and timekeeping responsibilities were transferred to the National Research Council of Canada, while geophysics, surveying, and mapping were transferred to the Department of Energy, Mines and Resources. The geophysics division was later merged into the Geological Survey of Canada, now part of Natural Resources Canada.

Astronomical timekeeping observations had already ceased by the 1960s when crystal oscillator and atomic clocks replaced astronomical methods. The building continued to house federal offices. As of the 2000s, it was home to the Office of Energy Efficiency of Natural Resources Canada.

== Telescope ==
From 1905 until 1970, the 15-inch refractor was available for public stargazing. In 1974 it was moved to the Helen Sawyer Hogg Observatory at the Canada Science and Technology Museum, where it continued to be used for public observing nights until 2014. It is now preserved in the Ingenium Collections Conservation Centre.

== Heritage and designation ==
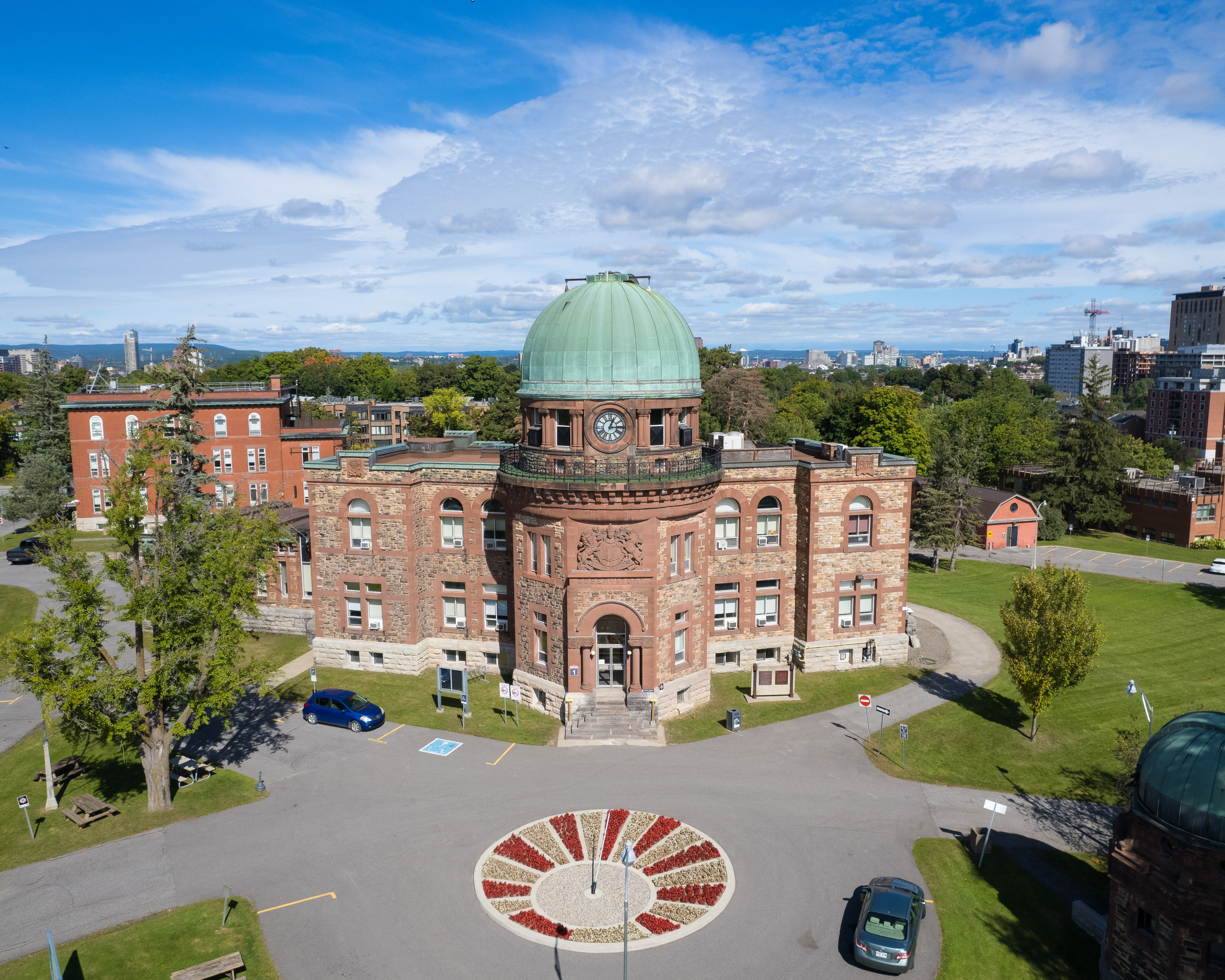
The Dominion Observatory in 2022

The Dominion Observatory was recognized in 1992 as a Classified Federal Heritage Building for its architectural and historic value.

In January 2025, the Dominion Observatory Complex, which includes the main observatory, the Observatory House (1909), the South Azimuth Building (1912), and the Photo-Equatorial Building (1914), was designated a National Historic Site of Canada.

== See also ==
- List of largest optical refracting telescopes
- Dominion Astrophysical Observatory
- David Dunlap Observatory
