= List of counties of Poland =

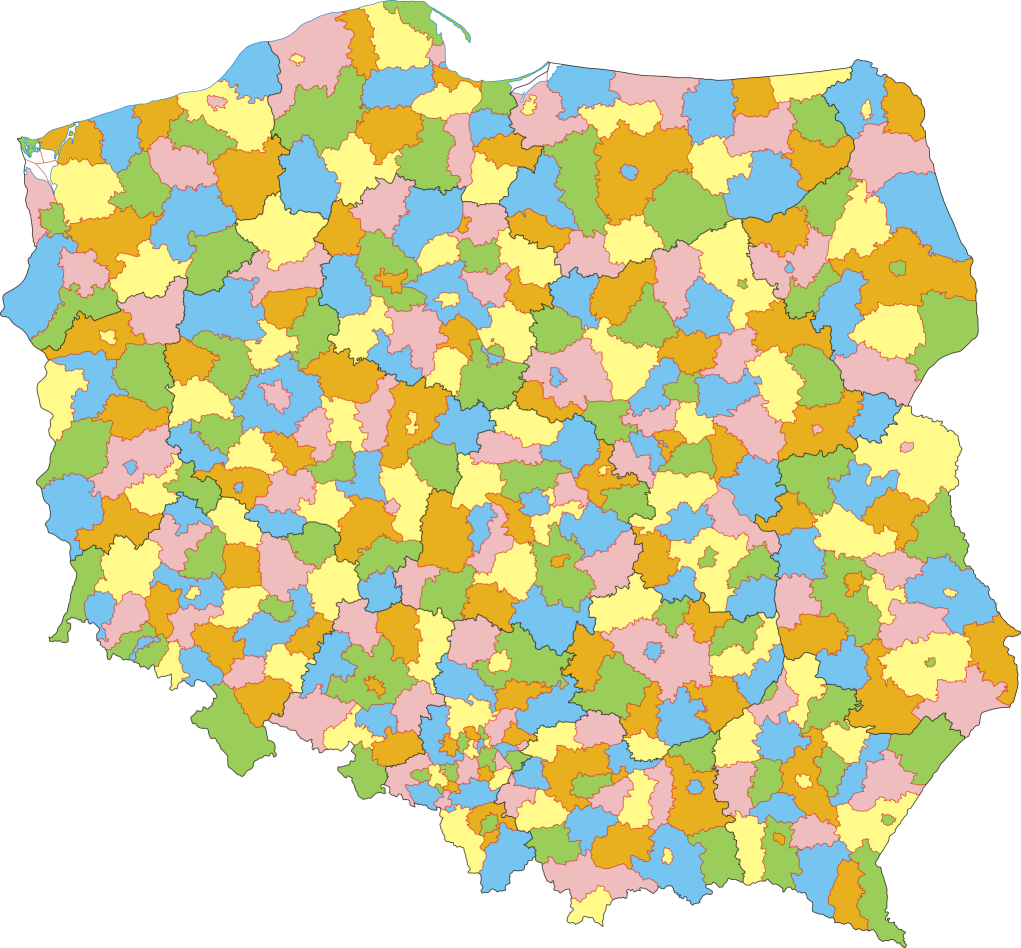
A map displaying the division of Poland into powiats (counties)

The following is an alphabetical list of all 380 county-level entities in Poland.

A county or powiat (pronounced povyat, /pɔv.jät/) is the second level of Polish administrative division, between the voivodeship (provinces) and the gmina (municipalities or communes; plural "gminy"). The list includes the 314 "land counties" (powiaty ziemskie) and the 66 "city counties" (miasta na prawach powiatu or powiaty grodzkie). For general information about these entities, see the article on powiats.

The following information is given in the list:

- English name (as used in Wikipedia)
- Polish name (does not apply to most city counties, since these are not translated). Sometimes two different counties have the same name in Polish (for example, Brzeg County and Brzesko County both have the original name powiat brzeski).
- County seat (not given in the case of city counties, as the seat is simply the city itself). Sometimes the seat is not part of the county, being itself a separate city county; in these cases the name of the seat is asterisked.
- Voivodeship of which the county is a part.
- Area in square kilometres.
- Number of gminy into which the county is divided (not given in the case of city counties, since these always constitute a single gmina).
- Population, according to official figures by 30 June 2025.

For tables of counties by voivodeship, see the articles on the particular voivodeships (Greater Poland Voivodeship etc.).

== Table of counties ==
County	Polish name	County seat	Voivodeship	Area	Gminy	Population	Density (per km^{2})
Aleksandrów County	powiat aleksandrowski	Aleksandrów Kujawski	Kuyavian–Pomeranian	475.61 km^{2}	9	52,837	116
Augustów County	powiat augustowski	Augustów	Podlaskie	1658.27 km^{2}	7	53,691	36
Bartoszyce County	powiat bartoszycki	Bartoszyce	Warmian–Masurian	1308.54 km^{2}	6	51,634	47
Będzin County	powiat będziński	Będzin	Silesian	368.02 km^{2}	8	143,092	36
Bełchatów County	powiat bełchatowski	Bełchatów	Łódź	969.21 km^{2}	8	107,608	116
Biała Podlaska	M. Biała Podlaska	city county	Lublin	49.40 km^{2}		53,650	1,174
Biała County	powiat bialski	Biała Podlaska	Lublin	2753.67 km^{2}	19	103,751	41
Białobrzegi County	powiat białobrzeski	Białobrzegi	Masovian	639.28 km^{2}	6	32,271	52
Białogard County	powiat białogardzki	Białogard	West Pomeranian	845.36 km^{2}	4	43,713	57
Białystok	M. Białystok	city county	Podlaskie	102,12 km^{2}		289,685	2,891
Białystok County	powiat białostocki	Białystok	Podlaskie	2984.64 km^{2}	15	160,052	46
Bielsk County	powiat bielski	Bielsk Podlaski	Podlaskie	1385.2 km^{2}	8	49,586	43
Bielsko County	powiat bielski	Bielsko-Biała	Silesian	457.23 km^{2}	10	165,638	330
Bielsko-Biała	M. Bielsko-Biała	city county	Silesian	124.51 km^{2}		163,605	1,419
Bieruń-Lędziny County	powiat bieruńsko-lędziński	Bieruń	Silesian	156.68 ^{2}	5	59,321	357
Bieszczady County	powiat bieszczadzki	Ustrzyki Dolne	Subcarpathian	1138.17 km^{2}	3	20,318	20
Biłgoraj County	powiat biłgorajski	Biłgoraj	Lublin	1677.79 km^{2}	14	94,757	62
Bochnia County	powiat bocheński	Bochnia	Lesser Poland	649.28 km^{2}	9	106,992	155
Bolesławiec County	powiat bolesławiecki	Bolesławiec	Lower Silesian	1303.26 km^{2}	6	87,034	68
Braniewo County	powiat braniewski	Braniewo	Warmian–Masurian	1204.54 km^{2}	7	36,543	36
Brodnica County	powiat brodnicki	Brodnica	Kuyavian–Pomeranian	1038.79 km^{2}	10	77,144	72
Brzeg County	powiat brzeski	Brzeg	Opole	876.52 km^{2}	6	85,269	105
Brzesko County	powiat brzeski	Brzesko	Lesser Poland	590 km^{2}	7	90,214	153
Brzeziny County	powiat brzeziński	Brzeziny	Łódź	358.51 km^{2}	5	30,021	85
Brzozów County	powiat brzozowski	Brzozów	Subcarpathian	540.39 km^{2}	6	62,638	121
Busko County	powiat buski	Busko-Zdrój	Świętokrzyskie	967.39 km^{2}	8	66,810	76
Bydgoszcz	M. Bydgoszcz	city county	Kuyavian–Pomeranian	175 km^{2}		322,464	2,085
Bydgoszcz County	powiat bydgoski	Bydgoszcz	Kuyavian–Pomeranian	1394.8 km^{2}	8	128,452	67
Bytom	M. Bytom	city county	Silesian	69.43 km^{2}		145,346	2,696
Bytów County	powiat bytowski	Bytów	Pomeranian	2192.81 km^{2}	10	75,928	34
Chełm	M. Chełm	city county	Lublin	35.28 km^{2}		55,981	1,927
Chełm County	powiat chełmski	Chełm	Lublin	1779.64 km^{2}	15	72,805	45
Chełmno County	powiat chełmiński	Chełmno	Kuyavian–Pomeranian	527.62 km^{2}	7	48,511	97
Chodzież County	powiat chodzieski	Chodzież	Greater Poland	680.58 km^{2}	5	44,669	69
Chojnice County	powiat chojnicki	Chojnice	Pomeranian	1364.25 km^{2}	5	95,413	67
Chorzów	M. Chorzów	city county	Silesian	33.5 km^{2}		98,897	3,415
Choszczno County	powiat choszczeński	Choszczno	West Pomeranian	1327.95 km^{2}	6	43,873	37
Chrzanów County	powiat chrzanowski	Chrzanów	Lesser Poland	371.49 km^{2}	5	117,279	345
Ciechanów County	powiat ciechanowski	Ciechanów	Masovian	1062.62 km^{2}	9	84,264	86
Cieszyn County	powiat cieszyński	Cieszyn	Silesian	730.2 km^{2}	12	173,288	234
Czarnków–Trzcianka County	powiat czarnkowsko-trzcianecki	Czarnków	Greater Poland	1808.19 km^{2}	8	82,475	47
Częstochowa	M. Częstochowa	city county	Silesian	160 km^{2}		202,415	1,538
Częstochowa County	powiat częstochowski	Częstochowa	Silesian	1519.49 km^{2}	16	130,774	88
Człuchów County	powiat człuchowski	Człuchów	Pomeranian	1574.41 km^{2}	7	52,497	36
Dąbrowa County	powiat dąbrowski	Dąbrowa Tarnowska	Lesser Poland	530.0 km^{2}	7	57,096	111
Dąbrowa Górnicza	M. Dąbrowa Górnicza	city county	Silesian	188 km^{2}		111,737	690
Dębica County	powiat dębicki	Dębica	Subcarpathian	776.36 km^{2}	7	131,685	171
Drawsko County	powiat drawski	Drawsko Pomorskie	West Pomeranian	1764.21 km^{2}	6	52,688	33
Działdowo County	powiat działdowski	Działdowo	Warmian–Masurian	953.18 km^{2}	6	60,702	68
Dzierżoniów County	powiat dzierżoniowski	Dzierżoniów	Lower Silesian	478.34 km^{2}	7	93,369	219
Elbląg	M. Elbląg	city county	Warmian–Masurian	80 km^{2}		111,580	1,588
Elbląg County	powiat elbląski	Elbląg	Warmian–Masurian	1430.55 km^{2}	9	53,465	39
Ełk County	powiat ełcki	Ełk	Warmian–Masurian	1111.87 km^{2}	5	87,827	76
Garwolin County	powiat garwoliński	Garwolin	Masovian	1284.29 km^{2}	14	105,048	83
Gdańsk	M. Gdańsk	city county	Pomeranian	262 km^{2}		489,160	1,747
Gdańsk County	powiat gdański	Pruszcz Gdański	Pomeranian	793.17 km^{2}	8	134,400	108
Gdynia	M. Gdynia	city county	Pomeranian	136 km^{2}		239,325	1,856
Giżycko County	powiat giżycki	Giżycko	Warmian–Masurian	1118.74 km^{2}	6	52,941	51
Gliwice	M. Gliwice	city county	Silesian	134.20 km^{2}		167,568	1,486
Gliwice County	powiat gliwicki	Gliwice	Silesian	663.35 km^{2}	8	112,793	173
Głogów County	powiat głogowski	Głogów	Lower Silesian	443.06 km^{2}	6	84,088	198
Głubczyce County	powiat głubczycki	Głubczyce	Opole	673.1 km^{2}	4	41,814	75
Gniezno County	powiat gnieźnieński	Gniezno	Greater Poland	1254.34 km^{2}	10	140,244	112
Gołdap County	powiat gołdapski	Gołdap	Warmian–Masurian	771.93 km^{2}	3	24,479	35
Goleniów County	powiat goleniowski	Goleniów	West Pomeranian	1616.99 km^{2}	6	81,110	49
Golub-Dobrzyń County	powiat golubsko-dobrzyński	Golub-Dobrzyń	Kuyavian–Pomeranian	612.98 km^{2}	6	42,844	74
Góra County	powiat górowski	Góra	Lower Silesian	738.11 km^{2}	4	31,841	50
Gorlice County	powiat gorlicki	Gorlice	Lesser Poland	967.36 km^{2}	10	104,174	110
Gorzów County	powiat gorzowski	Gorzów Wielkopolski	Lubusz	1213.32 km^{2}	7	71,407	54
Gorzów Wielkopolski	M. Gorzów Wielkopolski	city county	Lubusz	86 km^{2}		114,076	1,456
Gostyń County	powiat gostyński	Gostyń	Greater Poland	810.34 km^{2}	7	72,772	93
Gostynin County	powiat gostyniński	Gostynin	Masovian	615.56 km^{2}	5	41,487	76
Grajewo County	powiat grajewski	Grajewo	Podlaskie	967.24 km^{2}	6	43,509	52
Grodzisk County	powiat grodziski	Grodzisk Wielkopolski	Greater Poland	643.72 km^{2}	5	51,503	77
Grodzisk County	powiat grodziski	Grodzisk Mazowiecki	Masovian	366.87 km^{2}	6	107,759	213
Grójec County	powiat grójecki	Grójec	Masovian	1268.82 km^{2}	10	96,535	76
Grudziądz	M. Grudziądz	city county	Kuyavian–Pomeranian	57.76 km^{2}		87,241	1,712
Grudziądz County	powiat grudziądzki	Grudziądz	Kuyavian–Pomeranian	728.39 km^{2}	6	39,030	53
Gryfice County	powiat gryficki	Gryfice	West Pomeranian	1018.19 km^{2}	6	55,763	60
Gryfino County	powiat gryfiński	Gryfino	West Pomeranian	1869.54 km^{2}	9	76,202	44
Hajnówka County	powiat hajnowski	Hajnówka	Podlaskie	1623.65 km^{2}	9	37,896	30
Hrubieszów County	powiat hrubieszowski	Hrubieszów	Lublin	1269.45 km^{2}	8	55,428	54
Iława County	powiat iławski	Iława	Warmian–Masurian	1385 km^{2}	7	89,257	65
Inowrocław County	powiat inowrocławski	Inowrocław	Kuyavian–Pomeranian	1224.94 km^{2}	9	148,149	135
Janów County	powiat janowski	Janów Lubelski	Lublin	875.34 km^{2}	7	42,008	55
Jarocin County	powiat jarociński	Jarocin	Greater Poland	587.7 km^{2}	4	69,424	120
Jarosław County	powiat jarosławski	Jarosław	Subcarpathian	1029.15 km^{2}	11	114,799	119
Jasło County	powiat jasielski	Jasło	Subcarpathian	830.41 km^{2}	10	107,685	139
Jastrzębie-Zdrój	M. Jastrzębie-Zdrój	city county	Silesian	85.44 km^{2}		80,843	1,119
Jawor County	powiat jaworski	Jawor	Lower Silesian	581.25 km^{2}	6	46,550	90
Jaworzno	M. Jaworzno	city county	Silesian	152.2 km^{2}		86,695	632
Jędrzejów County	powiat jędrzejowski	Jędrzejów	Świętokrzyskie	1257.17 km^{2}	9	80,009	71
Jelenia Góra	M. Jelenia Góra	city county	Lower Silesian	109.22 km^{2}		73,849	795
Kalisz	M. Kalisz	city county	Greater Poland	70 km^{2}		91,515	1,552
Kalisz County	powiat kaliski	Kalisz	Greater Poland	1160.02 km^{2}	11	81,776	69
Kamień County	powiat kamieński	Kamień Pomorski	West Pomeranian	1006.65 km^{2}	6	43,570	47
Kamienna Góra County	powiat kamiennogórski	Kamienna Góra	Lower Silesian	396.13 km^{2}	4	39,611	117
Karkonosze County	powiat karkonoski	Jelenia Góra	Lower Silesian	628.21 km^{2}	9	59,618	102
Kartuzy County	powiat kartuski	Kartuzy	Pomeranian	1120.04 km^{2}	8	156,215	98
Katowice	M. Katowice	city county	Silesian	164.67 km^{2}		277,884	1,915
Kazimierza County	powiat kazimierski	Kazimierza Wielka	Świętokrzyskie	422.48 km^{2}	5	31,233	85
Kędzierzyn-Koźle County	powiat kędzierzyńsko-kozielski	Kędzierzyn-Koźle	Opole	625.28 km^{2}	6	84,970	163
Kępno County	powiat kępiński	Kępno	Greater Poland	608.39 km^{2}	7	55,647	91
Kętrzyn County	powiat kętrzyński	Kętrzyn	Warmian–Masurian	1212.97 km^{2}	6	55,886	55
Kielce	M. Kielce	city county	Świętokrzyskie	109.65 km^{2}		179,694	1,888
Kielce County	powiat kielecki	Kielce	Świętokrzyskie	2247.45 km^{2}	19	211,424	88
Kłobuck County	powiat kłobucki	Kłobuck	Silesian	889.15 km^{2}	9	81,098	95
Kłodzko County	powiat kłodzki	Kłodzko	Lower Silesian	1643.37 km^{2}	14	144,311	101
Kluczbork County	powiat kluczborski	Kluczbork	Opole	851.59 km^{2}	4	60,199	82
Kolbuszowa County	powiat kolbuszowski	Kolbuszowa	Subcarpathian	773.93 km^{2}	6	60,744	79
Kolno County	powiat kolneński	Kolno	Podlaskie	939.73 km^{2}	6	35,234	42
Koło County	powiat kolski	Koło	Greater Poland	1011.03 km^{2}	11	80,359	88
Kołobrzeg County	powiat kołobrzeski	Kołobrzeg	West Pomeranian	725.86 km^{2}	7	76,261	105
Konin	M. Konin	city county	Greater Poland	82 km^{2}		65,570	983
Konin County	powiat koniński	Konin	Greater Poland	1578.71 km^{2}	14	128,414	78
Końskie County	powiat konecki	Końskie	Świętokrzyskie	1139.90 km^{2}	8	72,314	74
Kościan County	powiat kościański	Kościan	Greater Poland	722.53 km^{2}	5	76,643	108
Kościerzyna County	powiat kościerski	Kościerzyna	Pomeranian	1165.85 km^{2}	8	72,098	57
Koszalin	M. Koszalin	city county	West Pomeranian	84 km^{2}		104,872	1,283
Koszalin County	powiat koszaliński	Koszalin	West Pomeranian	1669.09 km^{2}	8	64,310	38
Kozienice County	powiat kozienicki	Kozienice	Masovian	916.96 km^{2}	7	56,459	67
Kraków	M. Kraków	city county	Lesser Poland	327 km^{2}		810,590	2,314
Kraków County	powiat krakowski	Kraków	Lesser Poland	1229.62 km^{2}	17	305,085	199
Krapkowice County	powiat krapkowicki	Krapkowice	Opole	442.35 km^{2}	5	59,092	154
Kraśnik County	powiat kraśnicki	Kraśnik	Lublin	1005.34 km^{2}	10	87,726	99
Krasnystaw County	powiat krasnostawski	Krasnystaw	Lublin	1067.18 km^{2}	10	57,875	65
Krosno	M. Krosno	city county	Subcarpathian	43.48 km^{2}		43,454	1,109
Krosno County	powiat krośnieński	Krosno Odrzańskie	Lubusz	1390 km^{2}	7	51,949	41
Krosno County	powiat krośnieński	Krosno	Subcarpathian	923.79 km^{2}	9	107,649	118
Krotoszyn County	powiat krotoszyński	Krotoszyn	Greater Poland	714.23 km^{2}	6	74,205	108
Kutno County	powiat kutnowski	Kutno	Łódź	886.29 km^{2}	11	89,132	118
Kwidzyn County	powiat kwidzyński	Kwidzyn	Pomeranian	834.64 km^{2}	6	79,299	97
Łańcut County	powiat łańcucki	Łańcut	Subcarpathian	451.95 km^{2}	7	80,651	172
Łask County	powiat łaski	Łask	Łódź	617.38 km^{2}	5	48,310	82
Lębork County	powiat lęborski	Lębork	Pomeranian	706.99 km^{2}	5	63,304	90
Łęczna County	powiat łęczyński	Łęczna	Lublin	633.75 km^{2}	6	55,429	91
Łęczyca County	powiat łęczycki	Łęczyca	Łódź	774 km^{2}	8	45,866	69
Legionowo County	powiat legionowski	Legionowo	Masovian	389.86 km^{2}	5	133,671	247
Legnica	M. Legnica	city county	Lower Silesian	56.29 km^{2}		90,343	1,884
Legnica County	powiat legnicki	Legnica	Lower Silesian	744.6 km^{2}	8	54,853	71
Lesko County	powiat leski	Lesko	Subcarpathian	834.86 km^{2}	5	25,113	32
Leszno	M. Leszno	city county	Greater Poland	31.9 km^{2}		59,143	2,002
Leszno County	powiat leszczyński	Leszno	Greater Poland	804.65 km^{2}	7	60,877	62
Leżajsk County	powiat leżajski	Leżajsk	Subcarpathian	583.01 km^{2}	5	66,028	119
Lidzbark County	powiat lidzbarski	Lidzbark Warmiński	Warmian–Masurian	924.42 km^{2}	5	37,543	47
Limanowa County	powiat limanowski	Limanowa	Lesser Poland	951.96 km^{2}	12	131,552	128
Lipno County	powiat lipnowski	Lipno	Kuyavian–Pomeranian	1015.6 km^{2}	9	61,742	65
Lipsko County	powiat lipski	Lipsko	Masovian	747.58 km^{2}	6	31,019	49
Łobez County	powiat łobeski	Łobez	West Pomeranian	1065.61 km^{2}	5	32,798	36
Łódź	M. Łódź	city county	Łódź	293.25 km^{2}		642,590	2,608
Łódź East County	powiat łódzki wschodni	Łódź	Łódź	499.32 km^{2}	6	75,338	129
Łomża	M. Łomża	city county	Podlaskie	32.72 km^{2}		59,129	1,926
Łomża County	powiat łomżyński	Łomża	Podlaskie	1353.93 km^{2}	9	49,404	38
Łosice County	powiat łosicki	Łosice	Masovian	771.77 km^{2}	6	28,152	42
Łowicz County	powiat łowicki	Łowicz	Łódź	987.13 km^{2}	10	72,975	83
Lubaczów County	powiat lubaczowski	Lubaczów	Subcarpathian	1308,37 km^{2}	8	51,660	44
Lubań County	powiat lubański	Lubań	Lower Silesian	428,19 km^{2}	7	50,631	133
Lubartów County	powiat lubartowski	Lubartów	Lublin	1290,35 km^{2}	13	83,039	70
Lubin County	powiat lubiński	Lubin	Lower Silesian	711,99 km^{2}	4	102,016	148
Lublin	M. Lublin	city county	Lublin	147 km^{2}		327,384	2,410
Lublin County	powiat lubelski	Lublin	Lublin	1679,42 km^{2}	16	165,718	84
Lubliniec County	powiat lubliniecki	Lubliniec	Silesian	822,13 km^{2}	8	74,208	93
Łuków County	powiat łukowski	Łuków	Lublin	1394,09 km^{2}	11	99,781	78
Lwówek County	powiat lwówecki	Lwówek Śląski	Lower Silesian	709,94 km^{2}	5	42,218	68
Maków County	powiat makowski	Maków Mazowiecki	Masovian	1064.56 km^{2}	10	41,059	44
Malbork County	powiat malborski	Malbork	Pomeranian	494.63 km^{2}	6	60,115	127
Miechów County	powiat miechowski	Miechów	Lesser Poland	676.73 km^{2}	7	46,126	75
Międzychód County	powiat międzychodzki	Międzychód	Greater Poland	736.66 km^{2}	4	35,355	49
Międzyrzecz County	powiat międzyrzecki	Międzyrzecz	Lubusz	1387.83 km^{2}	6	54,128	42
Mielec County	powiat mielecki	Mielec	Subcarpathian	880.21 km^{2}	10	132,174	151
Mikołów County	powiat mikołowski	Mikołów; Ruda Śląska; Tychy	Silesian	231.53 km^{2}	5	100,026	392
Milicz County	powiat milicki	Milicz	Lower Silesian	715.01 km^{2}	3	35,281	51
Mińsk County	powiat miński	Mińsk Mazowiecki	Masovian	1164.35 km^{2}	13	159,666	121
Mława County	powiat mławski	Mława	Masovian	1182.3 km^{2}	10	68,273	62
Mogilno County	powiat mogileński	Mogilno	Kuyavian–Pomeranian	675.86 km^{2}	4	43,036	69
Mońki County	powiat moniecki	Mońki	Podlaskie	1382.39 km^{2}	7	36,762	31
Mrągowo County	powiat mrągowski	Mrągowo	Warmian–Masurian	1065.23 km^{2}	5	46,781	47
Myślenice County	powiat myślenicki	Myślenice	Lesser Poland	673.3 km^{2}	9	129,973	174
Myślibórz County	powiat myśliborski	Myślibórz	West Pomeranian	1181.95 km^{2}	5	61,406	57
Mysłowice	M. Mysłowice	city county	Silesian	65.57 km^{2}		70,468	1,136
Myszków County	powiat myszkowski	Myszków	Silesian	478.62 km^{2}	5	66,746	150
Nakło County	powiat nakielski	Nakło nad Notecią	Kuyavian–Pomeranian	1120.48 km^{2}	5	82,115	76
Namysłów County	powiat namysłowski	Namysłów	Opole	747.67 km^{2}	5	41,681	59
Nidzica County	powiat nidzicki	Nidzica	Warmian–Masurian	960.7 km^{2}	4	30,050	35
Nisko County	powiat niżański	Nisko	Subcarpathian	785.58 km^{2}	7	62,936	85
Nowa Sól County	powiat nowosolski	Nowa Sól	Lubusz	770.58 km^{2}	8	81,532	113
Nowe Miasto County	powiat nowomiejski	Nowe Miasto Lubawskie	Warmian–Masurian	695.01 km^{2}	5	41,586	62
Nowy Dwór County	powiat nowodworski	Nowy Dwór Mazowiecki	Masovian	691.65 km^{2}	6	79,257	109
Nowy Dwór County	powiat nowodworski	Nowy Dwór Gdański	Pomeranian	652.75 km^{2}	5	33,206	54
Nowy Sącz	M. Nowy Sącz	city county	Lesser Poland	57 km^{2}		79,555	1,484
Nowy Sącz County	powiat nowosądecki	Nowy Sącz	Lesser Poland	1550.24 km^{2}	16	214,689	128
Nowy Targ County	powiat nowotarski	Nowy Targ	Lesser Poland	1474.66 km^{2}	14	189,882	123
Nowy Tomyśl County	powiat nowotomyski	Nowy Tomyśl	Greater Poland	1011.67 km^{2}	6	74,953	71
Nysa County	powiat nyski	Nysa	Opole	1223.87 km^{2}	9	126,259	119
Oborniki County	powiat obornicki	Oborniki	Greater Poland	712.65 km^{2}	3	58,540	79
Oława County	powiat oławski	Oława	Lower Silesian	523.73 km^{2}	4	77,441	136
Olecko County	powiat olecki	Olecko	Warmian–Masurian	873.83 km^{2}	4	31,546	39
Oleśnica County	powiat oleśnicki	Oleśnica	Lower Silesian	1049.74 km^{2}	8	106,738	98
Olesno County	powiat oleski	Olesno	Opole	973.62 km^{2}	7	60,578	70
Olkusz County	powiat olkuski	Olkusz	Lesser Poland	622.19 km^{2}	6	104,347	184
Olsztyn	M. Olsztyn	city county	Warmian–Masurian	88.328 km^{2}		165,855	1,985
Olsztyn County	powiat olsztyński	Olsztyn	Warmian–Masurian	2840.29 km^{2}	12	130,787	40
Opatów County	powiat opatowski	Opatów	Świętokrzyskie	911.51 km^{2}	8	47,500	62
Opoczno County	powiat opoczyński	Opoczno	Łódź	1038.77 km^{2}	8	70,843	76
Opole	M. Opole	city county	Opole	96.2 km^{2}		125,095	1,334
Opole County	powiat opolski	Opole Lubelskie	Lublin	804.14 km^{2}	7	54,723	78
Opole County	powiat opolski	Opole	Opole	1586.82 km^{2}	13	120,771	85
Ostróda County	powiat ostródzki	Ostróda	Warmian–Masurian	1764.89 km^{2}	9	97,808	60
Ostrołęka	M. Ostrołęka	city county	Masovian	29.00 km^{2}		47,443	1,854
Ostrołęka County	powiat ostrołęcki	Ostrołęka	Masovian	2099.32 km^{2}	11	87,228	40
Ostrów County	powiat ostrowski	Ostrów Mazowiecka	Masovian	1218.06 km^{2}	11	67,559	62
Ostrów County	powiat ostrowski	Ostrów Wielkopolski	Greater Poland	1160.65 km^{2}	8	157,300	136
Ostrowiec County	powiat ostrowiecki	Ostrowiec Świętokrzyski	Świętokrzyskie	616.33 km^{2}	6	98,066	189
Ostrzeszów County	powiat ostrzeszowski	Ostrzeszów	Greater Poland	772.37 km^{2}	7	54,188	71
Oświęcim County	powiat oświęcimski	Oświęcim	Lesser Poland	406.03 km^{2}	9	147,119	378
Otwock County	powiat otwocki	Otwock	Masovian	615.09 km^{2}	8	126,504	189
Pabianice County	powiat pabianicki	Pabianice	Łódź	490.77 km^{2}	7	118,613	242
Pajęczno County	powiat pajęczański	Pajęczno	Łódź	804.14 km^{2}	8	47,829	66
Parczew County	powiat parczewski	Parczew	Lublin	952.62 km^{2}	7	31,644	38
Piaseczno County	powiat piaseczyński	Piaseczno	Masovian	621.04 km^{2}	6	219,289	234
Piekary Śląskie	M. Piekary Śląskie	city county	Silesian	40 km^{2}		51,193	1,487
Piła County	powiat pilski	Piła	Greater Poland	1267.1 km^{2}	9	129,115	108
Pińczów County	powiat pińczowski	Pińczów	Świętokrzyskie	611.03 km^{2}	5	36,085	69
Piotrków County	powiat piotrkowski	Piotrków Trybunalski	Łódź	1429.12 km^{2}	11	89,451	63
Piotrków Trybunalski	M. Piotrków Trybunalski	city county	Łódź	67.27 km^{2}		65,676	1,185
Pisz County	powiat piski	Pisz	Warmian–Masurian	1776.17 km^{2}	4	51,212	32
Pleszew County	powiat pleszewski	Pleszew	Greater Poland	711.91 km^{2}	6	60,608	87
Płock	M. Płock	city county	Masovian	88.06 km^{2}		109,349	1,447
Płock County	powiat płocki	Płock	Masovian	1798.71 km^{2}	15	108,828	59
Płońsk County	powiat płoński	Płońsk	Masovian	1383.67 km^{2}	12	83,116	63
Poddębice County	powiat poddębicki	Poddębice	Łódź	880.91 km^{2}	6	39,009	48
Police County	powiat policki	Police	West Pomeranian	664.16 km^{2}	4	87,292	97
Polkowice County	powiat polkowicki	Polkowice	Lower Silesian	779.93 km^{2}	6	60,759	78
Poznań	M. Poznań	city county	Greater Poland	261.85 km^{2}		534,913	2,162
Poznań County	powiat poznański	Poznań	Greater Poland	1899.61 km^{2}	17	456,993	153
Proszowice County	powiat proszowicki	Proszowice	Lesser Poland	414.57 km^{2}	6	41,841	105
Prudnik County	powiat prudnicki	Prudnik	Opole	571.16 km^{2}	4	50,574	105
Pruszków County	powiat pruszkowski	Pruszków	Masovian	246.31 km^{2}	6	182,186	593
Przasnysz County	powiat przasnyski	Przasnysz	Masovian	1217.82 km^{2}	7	48,316	43
Przemyśl	M. Przemyśl	city county	Subcarpathian	44 km^{2}		54,878	1,516
Przemyśl County	powiat przemyski	Przemyśl	Subcarpathian	1213.73 km^{2}	10	70,352	58
Przeworsk County	powiat przeworski	Przeworsk	Subcarpathian	698.35 km^{2}	9	75,109	113
Przysucha County	powiat przysuski	Przysucha	Masovian	800.68 km^{2}	8	38,065	55
Pszczyna County	powiat pszczyński	Pszczyna	Silesian	473.46 km^{2}	6	110,656	221
Puck County	powiat pucki	Puck	Pomeranian	577.85 km^{2}	7	92,647	128
Puławy County	powiat puławski	Puławy	Lublin	933 km^{2}	11	105,516	125
Pułtusk County	powiat pułtuski	Pułtusk	Masovian	828.63 km^{2}	7	50,052	62
Pyrzyce County	powiat pyrzycki	Pyrzyce	West Pomeranian	725.71 km^{2}	6	35,798	55
Racibórz County	powiat raciborski	Racibórz	Silesian	543.98 km^{2}	8	98,276	205
Radom	M. Radom	city county	Masovian	111.71 km^{2}		192,838	2,021
Radom County	powiat radomski	Radom	Masovian	1529.75 km^{2}	13	151,189	95
Radomsko County	powiat radomszczański	Radomsko	Łódź	1442.78 km^{2}	14	105,018	82
Radziejów County	powiat radziejowski	Radziejów	Kuyavian–Pomeranian	607 km^{2}	7	37,078	70
Radzyń County	powiat radzyński	Radzyń Podlaski	Lublin	965.21 km^{2}	8	54,226	64
Rawa County	powiat rawski	Rawa Mazowiecka	Łódź	646.6 km^{2}	6	45,430	76
Rawicz County	powiat rawicki	Rawicz	Greater Poland	553.23 km^{2}	5	58,132	107
Ropczyce-Sędziszów County	powiat ropczycko-sędziszowski	Ropczyce	Subcarpathian	548.89 km^{2}	5	74,017	130
Ruda Śląska	M. Ruda Śląska	city county	Silesian	77.7 km^{2}		128,138	1,878
Rybnik	M. Rybnik	city county	Silesian	148 km^{2}		129,307	955
Rybnik County	powiat rybnicki	Rybnik	Silesian	224.63 km^{2}	5	76,167	327
Ryki County	powiat rycki	Ryki	Lublin	615.54 km^{2}	6	50,648	96
Rypin County	powiat rypiński	Rypin	Kuyavian–Pomeranian	587.08 km^{2}	6	40,622	75
Rzeszów	M. Rzeszów	city county	Subcarpathian	77.31 km^{2}		198,540	2,118
Rzeszów County	powiat rzeszowski	Rzeszów	Subcarpathian	1218.8 km^{2}	14	177,307	139
Sandomierz County	powiat sandomierski	Sandomierz	Świętokrzyskie	675.89 km^{2}	9	70,566	121
Sanok County	powiat sanocki	Sanok	Subcarpathian	1225.12 km^{2}	8	88,683	77
Sejny County	powiat sejneński	Sejny	Podlaskie	856.07 km^{2}	5	18,322	25
Sępólno County	powiat sępoleński	Sępólno Krajeńskie	Kuyavian–Pomeranian	790.86 km^{2}	4	38,491	52
Siedlce	M. Siedlce	city county	Masovian	32 km^{2}		74,504	2,408
Siedlce County	powiat siedlecki	Siedlce	Masovian	1603.22 km^{2}	13	80,415	50
Siemianowice Śląskie	M. Siemianowice Śląskie	city county	Silesian	25.5 km^{2}		62,571	2,841
Siemiatycze County	powiat siemiatycki	Siemiatycze	Podlaskie	1459.58 km^{2}	9	39,925	33
Sieradz County	powiat sieradzki	Sieradz	Łódź	1491.04 km^{2}	11	110,121	81
Sierpc County	powiat sierpecki	Sierpc	Masovian	852.89 km^{2}	7	47,500	63
Skarżysko County	powiat skarżyski	Skarżysko-Kamienna	Świętokrzyskie	395.30 km^{2}	5	66,708	203
Skierniewice	M. Skierniewice	city county	Łódź	32.6 km^{2}		44,958	1,478
Skierniewice County	powiat skierniewicki	Skierniewice	Łódź	756.12 km^{2}	9	37,578	50
Sławno County	powiat sławieński	Sławno	West Pomeranian	1043.62 km^{2}	6	52,136	55
Słubice County	powiat słubicki	Słubice	Lubusz	999.77 km^{2}	5	45,496	47
Słupca County	powiat słupecki	Słupca	Greater Poland	837.91 km^{2}	8	56,822	70
Słupsk	M. Słupsk	city county	Pomeranian	43.15 km^{2}		84,409	2,288
Słupsk County	powiat słupski	Słupsk	Pomeranian	2304 km^{2}	10	95,581	40
Sochaczew County	powiat sochaczewski	Sochaczew	Masovian	731.02 km^{2}	8	82,692	114
Sokółka County	powiat sokólski	Sokółka	Podlaskie	2054.42 km^{2}	10	60,192	35
Sokołów County	powiat sokołowski	Sokołów Podlaski	Masovian	1131.42 km^{2}	9	49,256	50
Sopot	M. Sopot	city county	Pomeranian	17.31 km^{2}		31,300	2,343
Sosnowiec	M. Sosnowiec	city county	Silesian	91.26 km^{2}		183,962	2,474
Śrem County	powiat śremski	Śrem	Greater Poland	574.41 km^{2}	4	60,837	102
Środa County	powiat średzki	Środa Śląska	Lower Silesian	703.68 km^{2}	5	60,104	70
Środa County	powiat średzki	Środa Wielkopolska	Greater Poland	623.18 km^{2}	5	60,108	88
Stalowa Wola County	powiat stalowowolski	Stalowa Wola	Subcarpathian	832.92 km^{2}	6	99,605	131
Starachowice County	powiat starachowicki	Starachowice	Świętokrzyskie	523.27 km^{2}	5	82,321	180
Stargard County	powiat stargardzki	Stargard Szczeciński	West Pomeranian	1519.59 km^{2}	10	118,723	79
Starogard County	powiat starogardzki	Starogard Gdański	Pomeranian	1345.28 km^{2}	13	124,587	91
Staszów County	powiat staszowski	Staszów	Świętokrzyskie	924.84 km^{2}	8	67,502	80
Strzelce County	powiat strzelecki	Strzelce Opolskie	Opole	744.28 km^{2}	7	70,540	109
Strzelce-Drezdenko County	powiat strzelecko-drezdenecki	Strzelce Krajeńskie	Lubusz	1248.32 km^{2}	5	45,943	40
Strzelin County	powiat strzeliński	Strzelin	Lower Silesian	622.27 km^{2}	5	41,311	71
Strzyżów County	powiat strzyżowski	Strzyżów	Subcarpathian	503.36 km^{2}	5	58,557	123
Sucha County	powiat suski	Sucha Beskidzka	Lesser Poland	685.75 km^{2}	9	82,381	120
Sulęcin County	powiat sulęciński	Sulęcin	Lubusz	1177.43 km^{2}	5	33,078	30
Suwałki	M. Suwałki	city county	Podlaskie	65.24 km^{2}		68,067	1,065
Suwałki County	powiat suwalski	Suwałki	Podlaskie	1307.31 km^{2}	9	34,462	27
Świdnica County	powiat świdnicki	Świdnica	Lower Silesian	742.89 km^{2}	8	148,666	216
Świdnik County	powiat świdnicki	Świdnik	Lublin	468.97 km^{2}	5	68,739	154
Świdwin County	powiat świdwiński	Świdwin	West Pomeranian	1093.1 km^{2}	6	42,502	45
Świebodzin County	powiat świebodziński	Świebodzin	Lubusz	937.45 km^{2}	6	53,449	60
Świecie County	powiat świecki	Świecie	Kuyavian–Pomeranian	1472.78 km^{2}	11	94,048	66
Świętochłowice	M. Świętochłowice	city county	Silesian	13.22 km^{2}		44,777	4,244
Świnoujście	M. Świnoujście	city county	West Pomeranian	197.23 km^{2}		38,360	208
Szamotuły County	powiat szamotulski	Szamotuły	Greater Poland	1119.55 km^{2}	8	91,656	77
Szczecin	M. Szczecin	city county	West Pomeranian	301 km^{2}		385,158	1,365
Szczecinek County	powiat szczecinecki	Szczecinek	West Pomeranian	1765.22 km^{2}	6	71,729	44
Szczytno County	powiat szczycieński	Szczytno	Warmian–Masurian	1933.1 km^{2}	8	65,880	36
Sztum County	powiat sztumski	Sztum	Pomeranian	730.85 km^{2}	5	37,577	57
Szydłowiec County	powiat szydłowiecki	Szydłowiec	Masovian	452.22 km^{2}	5	37,037	89
Tarnobrzeg	M. Tarnobrzeg	city county	Subcarpathian	85.6 km^{2}		42,947	585
Tarnobrzeg County	powiat tarnobrzeski	Tarnobrzeg	Subcarpathian	520.02 km^{2}	4	50,394	103
Tarnów	M. Tarnów	city county	Lesser Poland	72.4 km^{2}		101,614	1,618
Tarnów County	powiat tarnowski	Tarnów	Lesser Poland	1413.44 km^{2}	16	196,814	137
Tarnowskie Góry County	powiat tarnogórski	Tarnowskie Góry	Silesian	642.63 km^{2}	9	138,603	215
Tatra County	powiat tatrzański	Zakopane	Lesser Poland	471.62 km^{2}	5	66,246	139
Tczew County	powiat tczewski	Tczew	Pomeranian	697.54 km^{2}	6	110,107	161
Tomaszów County	powiat tomaszowski	Tomaszów Lubelski	Lublin	1487.1 km^{2}	13	75,558	59
Tomaszów County	powiat tomaszowski	Tomaszów Mazowiecki	Łódź	1025.7 km^{2}	11	109,102	118
Toruń	M. Toruń	city county	Kuyavian–Pomeranian	115.72 km^{2}		193,224	1,792
Toruń County	powiat toruński	Toruń	Kuyavian–Pomeranian	1229.71 km^{2}	9	115,155	73
Trzebnica County	powiat trzebnicki	Trzebnica	Lower Silesian	1025.55 km^{2}	6	87,970	75
Tuchola County	powiat tucholski	Tuchola	Kuyavian–Pomeranian	1075.27 km^{2}	6	46,656	44
Turek County	powiat turecki	Turek	Greater Poland	929.4 km^{2}	9	80,191	90
Tychy	M. Tychy	city county	Silesian	81.72 km^{2}		120,518	1,596
Wąbrzeźno County	powiat wąbrzeski	Wąbrzeźno	Kuyavian–Pomeranian	501.31 km^{2}	5	31,962	70
Wadowice County	powiat wadowicki	Wadowice	Lesser Poland	645.74 km^{2}	10	156,800	239
Wągrowiec County	powiat wągrowiecki	Wągrowiec	Greater Poland	1040.8 km^{2}	7	68,790	65
Wałbrzych	M. Wałbrzych	city county	Lower Silesian	84.7 km^{2}		98,150	1,306
Wałbrzych County	powiat wałbrzyski	Wałbrzych	Lower Silesian	430.82 km^{2}	8	49,154	129
Wałcz County	powiat wałecki	Wałcz	West Pomeranian	1414.79 km^{2}	5	54,639	37
Warsaw	M. Warszawa	city county	Masovian	517 km^{2}		1,864,035	3,289
Warsaw West County	powiat warszawski zachodni	Ożarów Mazowiecki	Masovian	532.99 km^{2}	7	137,137	189
Węgorzewo County	powiat węgorzewski	Węgorzewo	Warmian–Masurian	693.43 km^{2}	3	20,483	34
Węgrów County	powiat węgrowski	Węgrów	Masovian	1219.18 km^{2}	9	61,248	56
Wejherowo County	powiat wejherowski	Wejherowo; Gdynia; Sopot	Pomeranian	1279.84 km^{2}	10	231,611	142
Wieliczka County	powiat wielicki	Wieliczka	Lesser Poland	427.8 km^{2}	5	146,282	246
Wieluń County	powiat wieluński	Wieluń	Łódź	927.69 km^{2}	10	71,692	84
Wieruszów County	powiat wieruszowski	Wieruszów	Łódź	576.22 km^{2}	7	41,239	74
Włocławek	M. Włocławek	city county	Kuyavian–Pomeranian	84.32 km^{2}		98,659	1,424
Włocławek County	powiat włocławski	Włocławek	Kuyavian–Pomeranian	1472.34 km^{2}	13	81,278	58
Włodawa County	powiat włodawski	Włodawa	Lublin	1256.27 km^{2}	8	34,732	32
Włoszczowa County	powiat włoszczowski	Włoszczowa	Świętokrzyskie	906.38 km^{2}	6	42,312	52
Wodzisław County	powiat wodzisławski	Wodzisław Śląski	Silesian	286.92 km^{2}	9	148,912	541
Wołomin County	powiat wołomiński	Wołomin	Masovian	955.37 km^{2}	12	278,927	212
Wołów County	powiat wołowski	Wołów	Lower Silesian	675 km^{2}	3	44,853	70
Wolsztyn County	powiat wolsztyński	Wolsztyn	Greater Poland	680.03 km^{2}	3	56,334	80
Wrocław	M. Wrocław	city county	Lower Silesian	293 km^{2}		672,545	2,168
Wrocław County	powiat wrocławski	Wrocław	Lower Silesian	1116.15 km^{2}	9	193,082	91
Września County	powiat wrzesiński	Września	Greater Poland	704.19 km^{2}	5	78,101	105
Wschowa County	powiat wschowski	Wschowa	Lubusz	624.82 km^{2}	3	36,884	62
Wysokie Mazowieckie County	powiat wysokomazowiecki	Wysokie Mazowieckie	Podlaskie	1288.49 km^{2}	10	52,597	46
Wyszków County	powiat wyszkowski	Wyszków	Masovian	876.49 km^{2}	6	73,056	82
Ząbkowice County	powiat ząbkowicki	Ząbkowice Śląskie	Lower Silesian	801.75 km^{2}	7	59,447	86
Zabrze	M. Zabrze	city county	Silesian	80.47 km^{2}		151,542	2,369
Żagań County	powiat żagański	Żagań	Lubusz	1131.29 km^{2}	9	72,542	73
Zambrów County	powiat zambrowski	Zambrów	Podlaskie	733.11 km^{2}	5	40,962	61
Zamość	M. Zamość	city county	Lublin	30.34 km^{2}		57,185	2,196
Zamość County	powiat zamojski	Zamość	Lublin	1872.27 km^{2}	15	99,484	59
Żary County	powiat żarski	Żary	Lubusz	1393.49 km^{2}	10	89,846	71
Zawiercie County	powiat zawierciański	Zawiercie	Silesian	1003.27 km^{2}	10	109,694	124
Zduńska Wola County	powiat zduńskowolski	Zduńska Wola	Łódź	369.19 km^{2}	4	62,654	184
Zgierz County	powiat zgierski	Zgierz	Łódź	853.71 km^{2}	9	165,627	188
Zgorzelec County	powiat zgorzelecki	Zgorzelec	Lower Silesian	838.11 km^{2}	7	83,856	113
Zielona Góra	M. Zielona Góra	city county	Lubusz	58 km^{2}		138,760	2,038
Zielona Góra County	powiat zielonogórski	Zielona Góra	Lubusz	1570.64 km^{2}	10	74,599	57
Złotoryja County	powiat złotoryjski	Złotoryja	Lower Silesian	575.45 km^{2}	6	39,946	79
Złotów County	powiat złotowski	Złotów	Greater Poland	1660.91 km^{2}	8	66,653	41
Żnin County	powiat żniński	Żnin	Kuyavian–Pomeranian	984.55 km^{2}	6	66,799	71
Żory	M. Żory	city county	Silesian	64.64 km^{2}		61,887	969
Żuromin County	powiat żuromiński	Żuromin	Masovian	805.01 km^{2}	6	34,932	50
Zwoleń County	powiat zwoleński	Zwoleń	Masovian	571.24 km^{2}	5	33,949	65
Żyrardów County	powiat żyrardowski	Żyrardów	Masovian	532.63 km^{2}	5	74,841	140
Żywiec County	powiat żywiecki	Żywiec	Silesian	1039.96 km^{2}	15	147,784	144
