= Kopciowice =

- Village
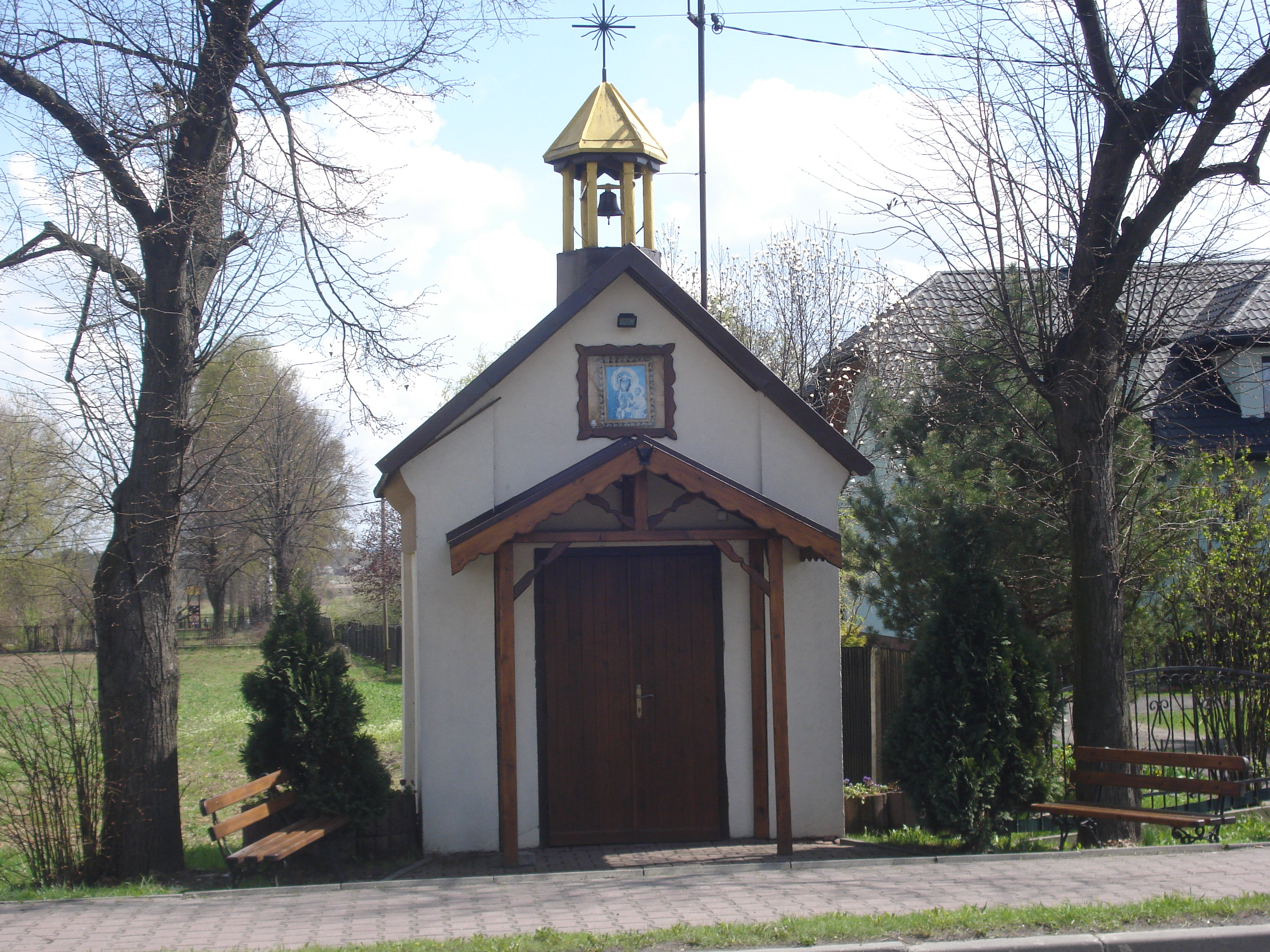
- Wayside chapel

- Location within Poland
- Coordinates: 50°5′38″N 19°12′12″E
- Country: Poland
- Voivodeship: Silesian
- County: Bieruń-Lędziny
- Gmina: Chełm Śląski

Kopciowice [kɔpt͡ɕɔˈvit͡sɛ] is a village in the administrative district of Gmina Chełm Śląski, within Bieruń-Lędziny County, Silesian Voivodeship, in southern Poland.

== Name ==
In the alphabetical listing of localities in the Silesia region published in 1830 in Wrocław by Johann Knie, the village appears under the Polish name Kopcziowic as well as the Germanized name Kopcziowitz. The listing also records hamlets and manor farms in the village: Goszcziniecz, Kudrowitzer Muhle, Stosseck, and Golce. The name refers to the mounds located within the village area.
