= Halemba (surname) =

Halemba is a surname. Notable people with the surname include:

- Andrzej Halemba (born 1954), Polish Roman-Catholic priest
- Daniel Halemba (born 2001), German politician
