= Międzyrzecze, Silesian Voivodeship =

Międzyrzecze
- Village
- Location within Poland
- Coordinates: 50°1′20″N 19°3′56″E
- Country: Poland
- Voivodeship: Silesian
- County: Bieruń-Lędziny
- Gmina: Bojszowy
- Population: 754

Międzyrzecze [mjɛnd͡zɨˈʐɛt͡ʂɛ] is a village in the administrative district of Gmina Bojszowy, within Bieruń-Lędziny County, Silesian Voivodeship, in southern Poland.

== History ==
During the political upheaval caused by Matthias Corvinus the land around Pszczyna was overtaken by Casimir II, Duke of Cieszyn, who sold it in 1517 to the Hungarian magnates of the Thurzó family, forming the Pless state country. In the accompanying sales document issued on 21 February 1517 the village was mentioned as Mezerziczi. The Kingdom of Bohemia in 1526 became part of the Habsburg monarchy. In the War of the Austrian Succession, most of Silesia was conquered by the Kingdom of Prussia, including the village.
