= Chełm Mały =

- Village
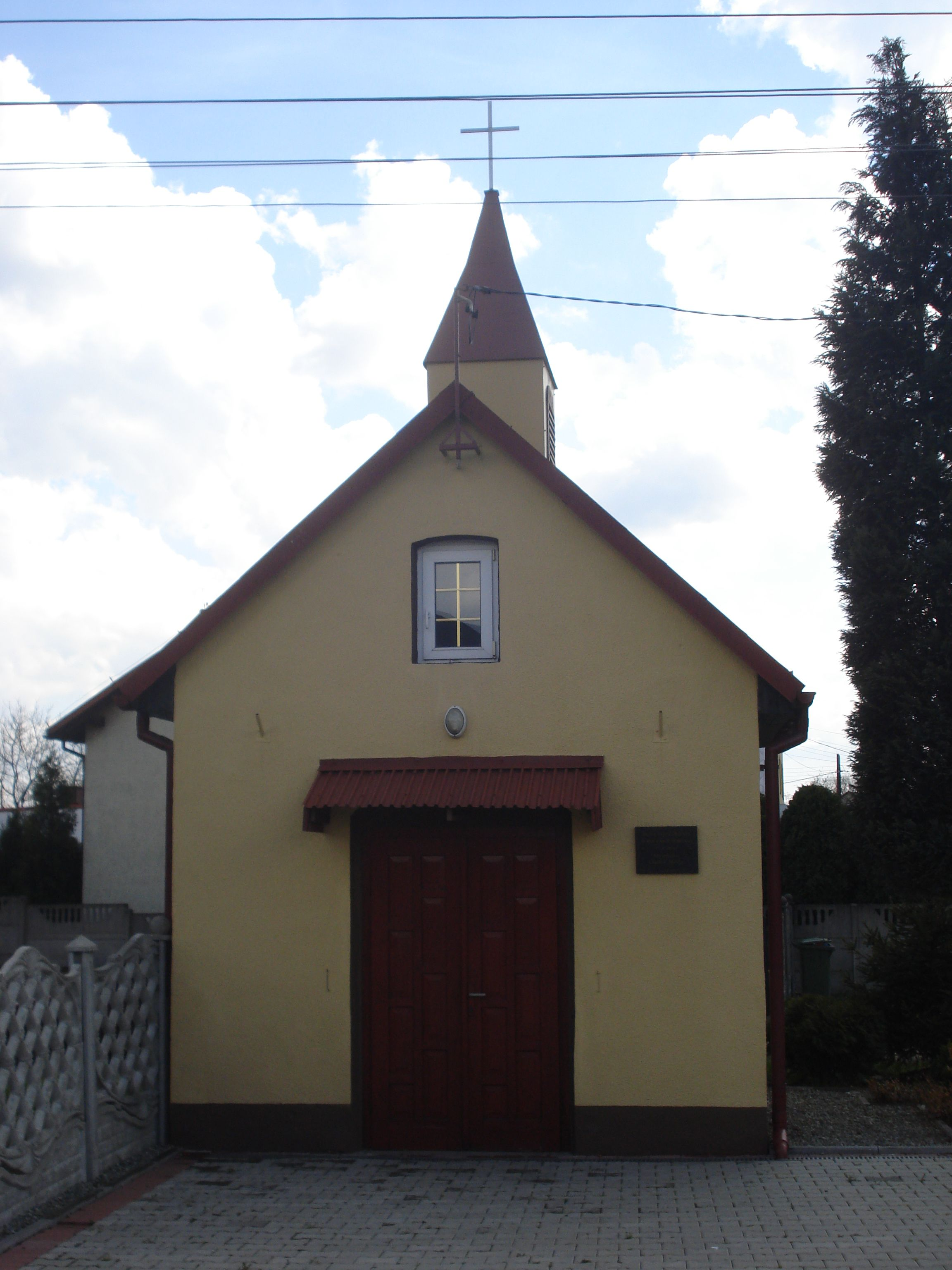
- Wayside chapel

- Location within Poland
- Coordinates: 50°6′10″N 19°13′17″E
- Country: Poland
- Voivodeship: Silesian
- County: Bieruń-Lędziny
- Gmina: Chełm Śląski

Chełm Mały (Polish pronunciation: [xɛwm ˈmawɨ]) is a village in the administrative district of Gmina Chełm Śląski, within Bieruń-Lędziny County, Silesian Voivodeship, in southern Poland.
