= Gmina Bojszowy =

Gmina Bojszowy Bojszowy Commune
- Gmina
- Coat of arms
- Interactive map of Gmina Bojszowy
- Coordinates (Bojszowy): 50°4′N 19°6′E
- Country: Poland
- Voivodeship: Silesian
- County: Bieruń-Lędziny
- Seat: Bojszowy

Area
  - Total: 34.07 km^{2} (13.15 sq mi)

Population (2019-06-30)
  - Total: 7,899
  - Density: 231.8/km^{2} (600.5/sq mi)
- Website: https://bojszowy.pl/

Gmina Bojszowy is a rural gmina (administrative district) in Bieruń-Lędziny County, Silesian Voivodeship, in southern Poland. Its seat is the village of Bojszowy, which lies approximately 8 kilometres (5 mi) south of Bieruń and 22 km (14 mi) south of the regional capital Katowice.

The gmina covers an area of 34.07 square kilometres (13.2 sq mi), and as of 2019 its total population is 7,899.

== Villages ==
Gmina Bojszowy contains the villages and settlements of Bojszowy, Bojszowy Nowe, Jedlina, Międzyrzecze and Świerczyniec.

== Neighbouring gminas ==
Gmina Bojszowy is bordered by the towns of Bieruń and Tychy, and by the gminas of Kobiór, Miedźna, Oświęcim and Pszczyna.
