= Gmina Chełm Śląski =

Gmina Chełm Śląski Chełm Śląski Commune
- Gmina
- Coat of arms
- Interactive map of Gmina Chełm Śląski
- Coordinates (Chełm Śląski): 50°6′34″N 19°11′36″E
- Country: Poland
- Voivodeship: Silesian
- County: Bieruń-Lędziny
- Seat: Chełm Śląski

Area
  - Total: 23.33 km^{2} (9.01 sq mi)

Population (2019-06-30)
  - Total: 6,326
  - Density: 271.2/km^{2} (702.3/sq mi)
- Website: http://www.chelmsl.pl

Gmina Chełm Śląski is a rural gmina (administrative district) in Bieruń-Lędziny County, Silesian Voivodeship, in southern Poland. Its seat is the village of Chełm Śląski ("Silesian Chelm"), which lies approximately 8 kilometres (5 mi) east of Bieruń and 21 km (13 mi) south-east of the regional capital Katowice. The gmina also contains the villages of Chełm Mały ("Little Chełm") and Kopciowice.

The gmina covers an area of 23.22 square kilometres (9.0 sq mi), and as of 2019 its total population is 6,326.

== Neighbouring gminas ==
Gmina Chełm Śląski is bordered by the towns of Bieruń, Imielin and Lędziny, and by the gmina of Chełmek.
