= Jedlina, Silesian Voivodeship =

Jedlina
- Village
- Location within Poland
- Coordinates: 50°2′N 19°8′E
- Country: Poland
- Voivodeship: Silesian
- County: Bieruń-Lędziny
- Gmina: Bojszowy
- Population: 463

Jedlina [jɛˈdlina] is a village in the administrative district of Gmina Bojszowy, within Bieruń-Lędziny County, Silesian Voivodeship, in southern Poland.
