= Bojszowy Nowe =

- Village
- Location within Poland
- Coordinates: 50°2′36″N 19°4′6″E
- Country: Poland
- Voivodeship: Silesian
- County: Bieruń-Lędziny
- Gmina: Bojszowy
- Population: 1,192

Bojszowy Nowe [bɔi̯ˈʂɔvɨ ˈnɔvɛ] is a village, in the administrative district of Gmina Bojszowy, within Bieruń-Lędziny County, Silesian Voivodeship, in southern Poland.
