= Świerczyniec =

- Village
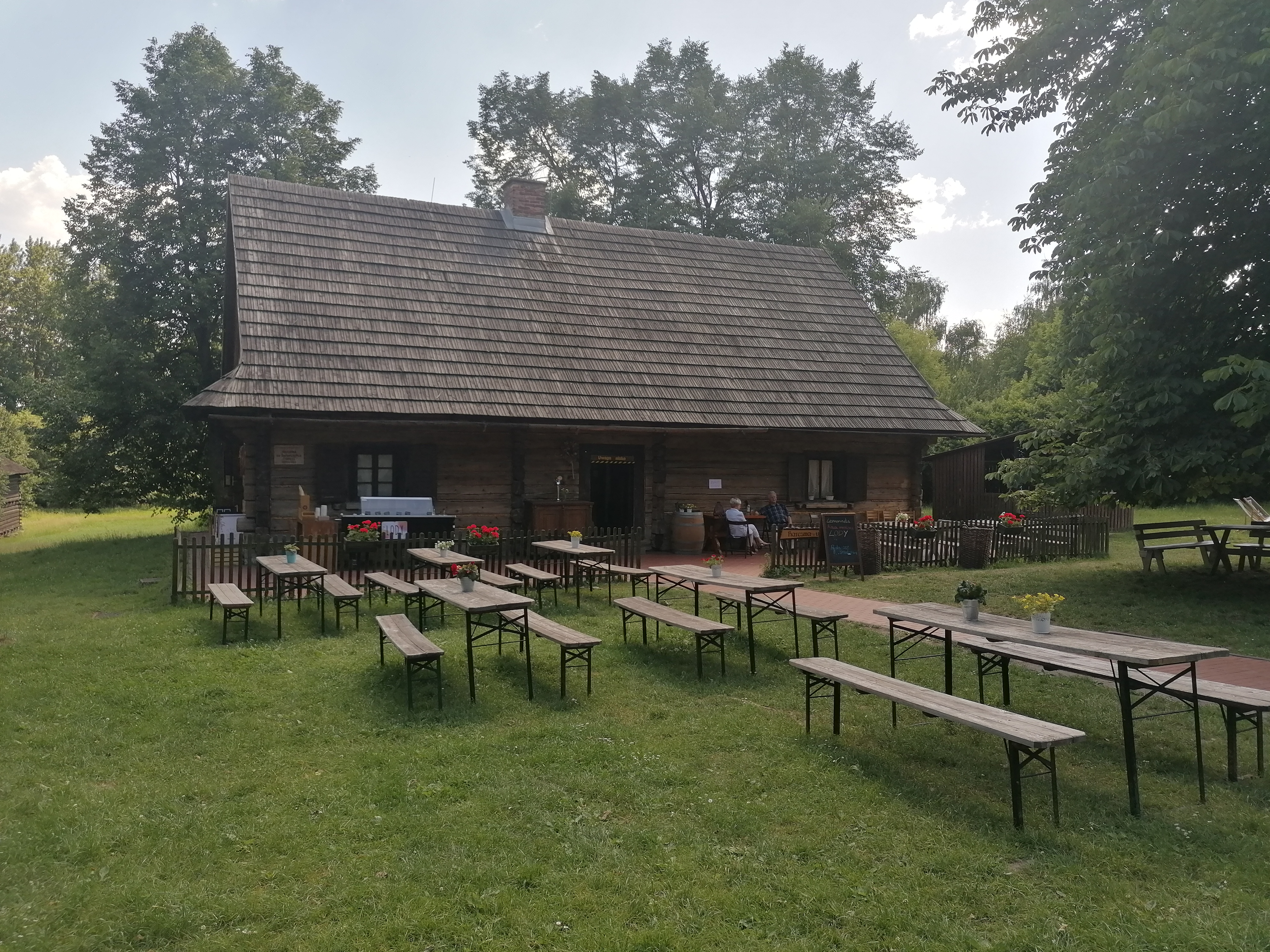

- Location within Poland
- Coordinates: 50°3′N 19°2′E
- Country: Poland
- Voivodeship: Silesian
- County: Bieruń-Lędziny
- Gmina: Bojszowy
- Population: 973

Świerczyniec (Polish: [ɕfjɛrˈt͡ʂɨɲɛt͡s]) is a village in the administrative district of Gmina Bojszowy, within Bieruń-Lędziny County, Silesian Voivodeship, in southern Poland.
