= Gostynia =

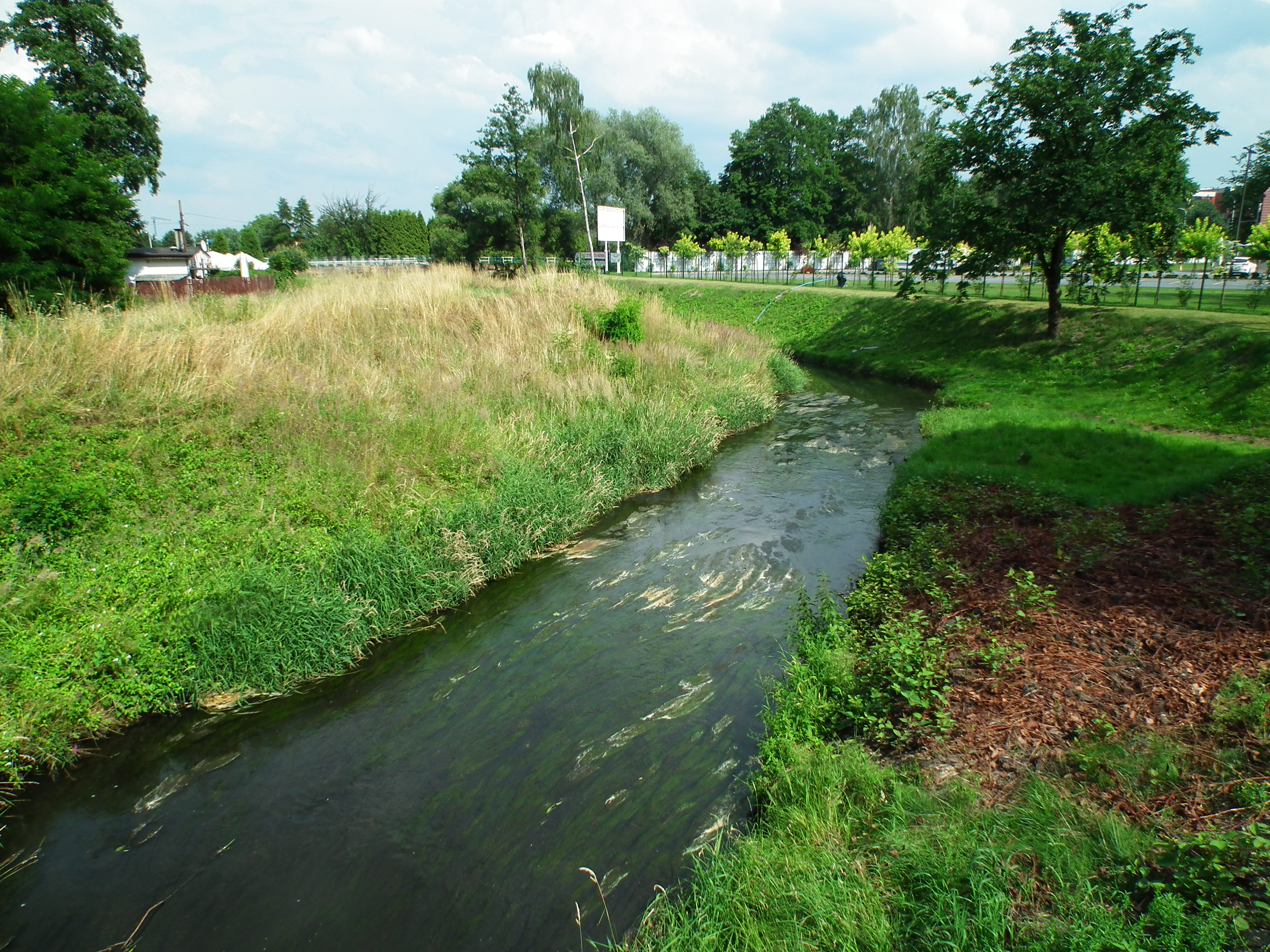

Location
- Country: Poland

Physical characteristics
- Mouth
  - location: Vistula
  - coordinates: 50.0570°N 19.1626°E

Basin features
- Progression: Vistula→ Baltic Sea

The Gostynia (German: Gostine, also known as Gostynka) is a river of southern Poland, and a left-bank tributary of the Vistula. It flows through Tychy, and joins the Vistula near Bieruń.
