= Chełm Śląski =

- Village
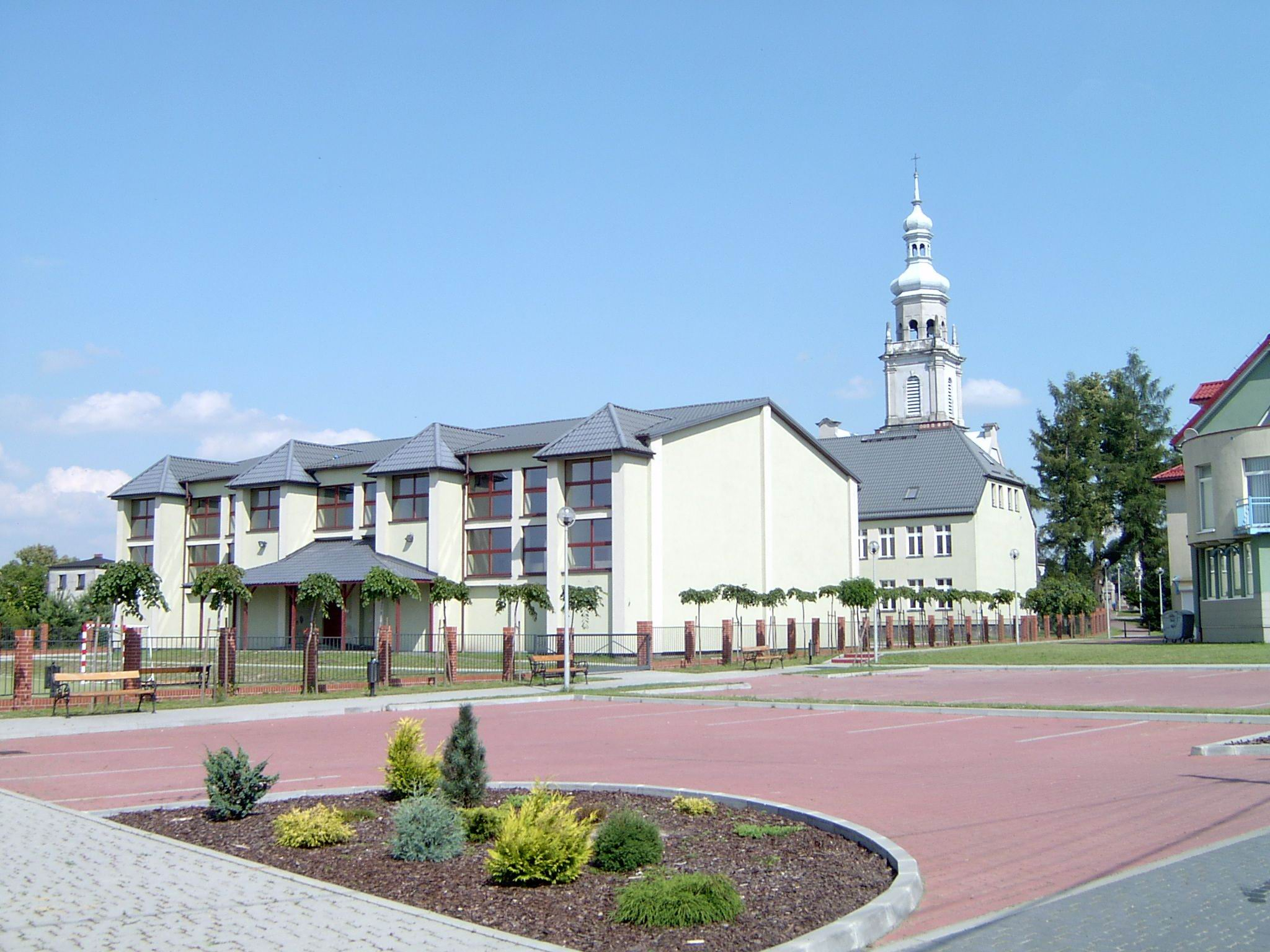
- Centre of the village

- Coat of arms

- Location within Poland
- Coordinates: 50°6′34″N 19°11′36″E
- Country: Poland
- Voivodeship: Silesian
- County: Bieruń-Lędziny
- Gmina: Chełm Śląski
- Population: 5,646
- Website: http://www.chelmsl.pl/

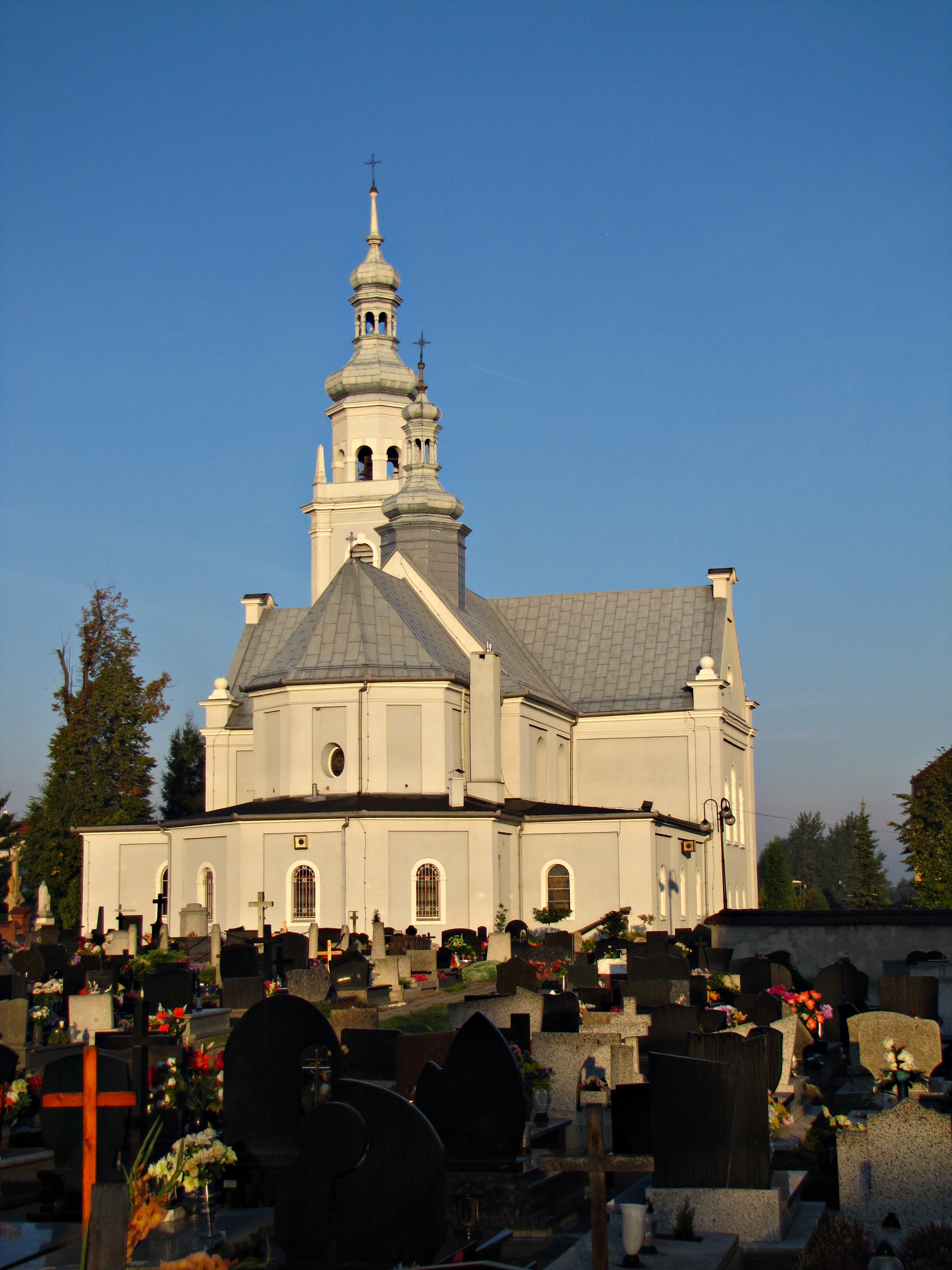
The Church of the Holy Trinity in Chełm Śląski

Chełm Śląski (Polish pronunciation: [xɛwm ˈɕlɔ̃skʲi]; Silesian: Chełm Ślōnski) is a village in Bieruń-Lędziny County, Silesian Voivodeship, in southern Poland. It is the seat of the gmina (administrative district) called Gmina Chełm Śląski.

The village serves as the administrative seat of the Chełm Śląski Commune. Between 1975 and 1998, the village belonged administratively to the Katowice Voivodeship. On December 30, 1994, Chełm Śląski and Imielin were separated from Mysłowice.

One of the village's best known people is the missionary scholar and priest, Father Andrzej Halemba.
