= Andrzej Halemba =

Polish missionary and priest

Reverend Father Andrzej Halemba
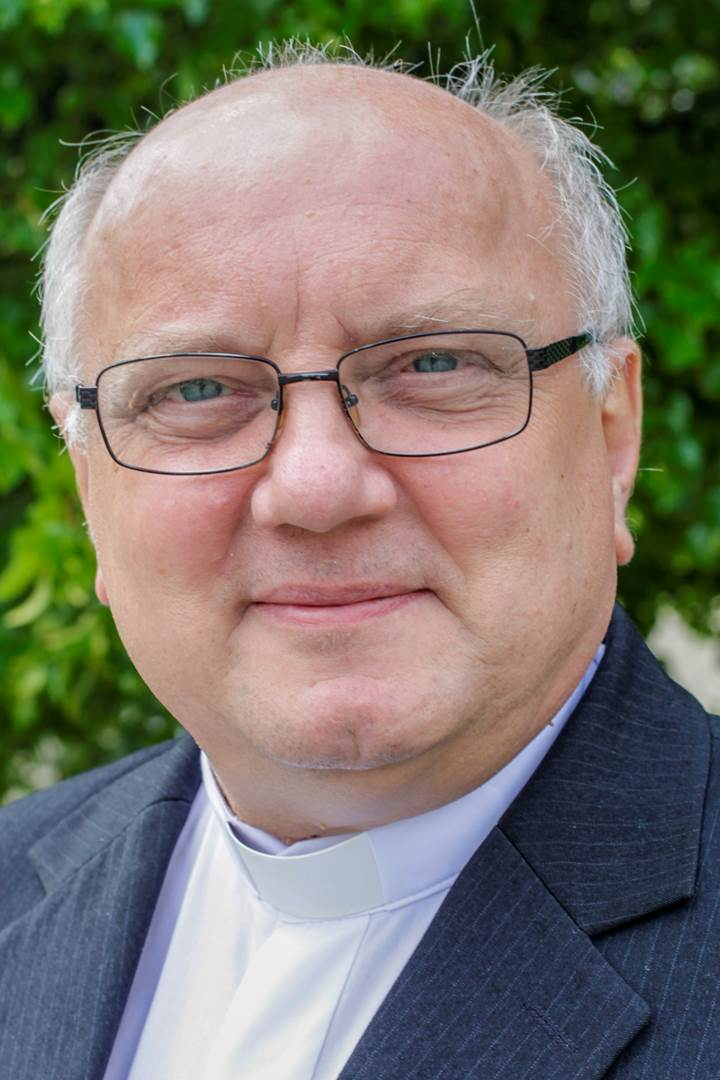
- Diocese: Archdiocese of Katowice

Orders
- Ordination: April 3, 1980 by Bp Herbert Bednorz

Personal details
- Born: Andrzej Halemba; November 19, 1954 Chełm Śląski, Silesia, Poland
- Denomination: Roman Catholic Church
- Education: former Academy of Catholic Theology (now Cardinal Stefan Wyszyński University) in Warsaw
- Motto: Omnia possum in eo qui me confortat (English: There is nothing I cannot do in the One who strengthens me Philippians 4,13)

Ordination history of Andrzej Halemba
History
Priestly ordination
- Date: April 03, 1980

Fr Andrzej Halemba – (born on 19 November 1954 in Chełm Śląski, Poland) a Polish Catholic Presbyter, Fidei Donum missionary priest, translator of the New Testament and author of Mambwe-English dictionary, former Director of the Missionary Formation Centre in Warsaw and Secretary the Polish Episcopate Commission for Missions; Polish Bishops’ Conference Delegate for Missionary Affairs; founder of the Missionary Museum in Brzęczkowice, Poland. From 2006 to 2020 he worked for the international organisation “Aid to the Church in Need International” (ACN Intl.), located in Germany. First, he was responsible for providing help to the Church in English and Portuguese-speaking African countries and from 2010 for helping the Church in 23 countries in the Middle East. In 2020 he launched a worldwide evangelisation project: International Initiative "Our way to God".

== Biography ==
=== Youth and vocation to priesthood ===
He was born on November 19, 1954, in Chełm Śląski, son of Eric Halemba and Maria née Ryszka. He has two brothers Bernard and Venantius. He attended elementary school in his hometown, and in 1969 he began his education at the Tadeusz Kościuszko High School in Mysłowice. His interests lay in philosophy and anthropology. After passing his final exams in 1973, he joined the Higher Silesian Seminary in Cracow. In 1981 he obtained a master's degree in Theology at the Pontifical Academy of Theology in Cracow, where. On April 3, 1980, he was ordained a priest by Bishop Herbert Bednorz in the cathedral of Katowice. He worked with great commitment for the Children of Mary, a group which supports missionaries, when he was a vicar in the parish of St Peter and Paul in Świętochłowice. At that time, he was already very eager to go on missions.

=== Missionary vocation and work in Zambia ===
A meeting with Hyacinthe Thiandoum, the Senegalese Cardinal from Dakar, that took place in 1979, during the first pilgrimage of John Paul II to Poland, had a significant impact on Halemba's decision to become a missionary. The young seminarian was fascinated by the Cardinal's directness, openness and great sense of humour. After language preparation over several months, he went to Zambia in 1983, where he served for 12 years in the diocese of Mbala (now Kasama), in the Mambwe Mission "Fidei Donum" as a missionary (1983-1993 et 2004–2005).

Fr Halemba's Missionary service of was not confined to pastoral activities alone, but also covered many other areas. Medical treatment was one of the services he provided, despite very limited resources. He had to struggle with difficulties such as malnutrition, a malaria epidemic, lack of antibiotics and vaccines, high perinatal mortality - with the nearest hospital about 80 km away, it was not always possible to bring the patient there on time.

To overcome the obstacles in saving every human life, the missionaries and the local people have undertaken the construction of a charitable hospital in Mambwe, at the periphery of the diocese and country. Thanks to the administrative assistance of Bishop Adolf Fürstenberg, the financial support of benefactors and the commitment of the local people who contributed with their labour, the hospital in Mambwe was finished in two years. Fr Halemba contributed also to the creation of the first kindergarten and the first high school in the Mambwe Mission.

=== Translations for the evangelization ===
The Mambwe people were the first of 72 local tribes to accept Catholic missionaries. First, White Fathers stopped in Mambwe Mwela, and bought 200 slaves from Arabs who transported them by the old slave road, Stevenson Road, connecting the North Province with the Atlantic and the Indian Ocean, as described by Stevenson. This is also where the first Christian settlement and school were established.

However, until that time, the Mambwe people did not have a good translation of the New Testament in their mother tongue. They were reluctant to use the existing Protestant translation from the late nineteenth century with numerous borrowings derived from Swahili, outdated linguistic forms, and lots of grammatical inconsistencies. Therefore, a new, more understandable translation was needed, especially for the younger generation. Fr Halemba, assisted by a group of local consultants, took up the challenge and translated the New Testament into the language of the Mambwe people in just two years. Polish missionaries from Fidei Donum printed it out as a gift on the occasion of the jubilee of the centenary of the Catholic Church in Zambia in 1991.

In 1994, he published the Mambwe-English dictionary, on which he has worked for ten years (1984-1994); it contains 17,500 entries and is the most extensive existing dictionary of the Bantu language in Zambia. In 2007, he released two important publications: the English-Mambwe Dictionary, based on the Oxford Advanced Learner's Dictionary and containing 21,300 entries, as well as a grammar of the Mambwe language. In addition, Fr Halemba edited and published the work of the African missionary, White Father Marcel Petitclair, the Roman Missal in the Mambwe language. In 2009, Fr Halemba contributed to the publication of the Bible for children in Mambwe, God speaks to His Children, and compiled and completed a three-volume liturgical guide for catechists ("Mambwe Liturgical Lectionaries A, B and C"), also initiated by Fr Marcel Petitclair M. Afr.

=== Scientific work ===
During the years 1993–1994, he studied missiology at the former Academy of Catholic Theology (now Cardinal Stefan Wyszyński University) in Warsaw, and concluded his studies with a Licentiate of Theology thesis entitled "Some aspects of inculturation of the Mambwe people in the light of the exhortation of Paul VI, Africae terrarum". In 2004, he obtained a doctoral degree in theological sciences with his thesis entitled "Religious and ethical values in the proverbs of the Mambwe, Zambia". In 2005, he published folk tales and proverbs of the Mambwe people in English and Mambwe, which was later published as a two volume book. These have contributed to saving many aspects of the Mambwean tradition from oblivion. Currently two publications are in the pipeline: the second volume of African folk tales (English-Mambwe) and "History and customs of the Mambwe people (Zambia)".

=== Work for Missions ===
In 1996, he became the director of the Missionary Formation Centre in Warsaw and the secretary of the Polish Episcopate Commission for Missions, and in 1999 he was additionally nominated as Polish Bishops’ Conference Delegate for Missionary Affairs. At that time, he organized many activities and competitions, among others competitions for children, such as "My school friend from Africa" and "Mission Olympics". His mandate to serve at the Polish Episcopate Commission for Missions and Missionary Formation Centre finished in 2003.

During his pastoral and missionary journeys, he has collected many souvenirs such as objects for everyday use, works of art (mainly African, but also Indian and Papuan) and objects of worship. With his multitudinous collection, he founded the Cardinal August Hlond Missionary Museum. It was opened on January 12, 2004, in the parish of Our Lady of Sorrows in Brzęczkowice. Through his work he contributed to the popularisation of the missions and raising awareness of the missionary character of the Church and the awakening of missionary vocations. He returns to Zambia every year and organises the annual meeting of Polish missionaries in Lusaka for years, as well as the Mambwe Cultural Contest - a festival of the traditional language: oratory art, narration of folk tales, poetry, song and dance.

=== Aid to the Church in Need International / Kirche in Not ===
In 2006-2020 Fr Halemba worked in the international organization Aid to the Church in Need (ACN Intl.) located in Königstein im Taunus, Germany. From 2006 to 2010, he was responsible for helping English and Portuguese-speaking African countries. From 2010 to 2020 he was responsible for helping the Church in the Middle East (the Holy Land, i.e. Israel and Palestine, Lebanon, Jordan, Syria, Iraq, Iran, Afghanistan, Turkey, Cyprus, Azerbaijan, Georgia, Armenia, Egypt, Ethiopia, Eritrea) and in the Arabian Peninsula (Saudi Arabia, Yemen, Oman, Kuwait, Qatar, Bahrain, United Arab Emirates). He co-operates with the Reunion of Aid Agencies for the Oriental Churches (R.O.A.C.O.) in frame of the Congregation for Oriental Churches, a committee which unites funding agencies from various countries around the world for the sake of providing better assistance to Christians.

During the genocide of Christians in the Middle East, he hurried to the rescue of the Church affected by war and persecution, especially in Iraq and Syria. He is the author of the Return to the Roots program (Marshall Plan for the Nineveh Plains), which obtained international financial support and enabled the reconstruction of private homes and the infrastructure of the Church in Iraq. Thanks to this initiative, nearly half of the expelled Christian families could return to their homes. Similarly, in Syria, his charitable and ecumenical actions have helped Christians to survive the worst and keep their hope alive (including Candles for peace in Syria; Rosary for Peace; Console my People; and Peregrination of Our Lady of Sorrows, Consoler of Syrians). His practical ecumenism has led to more effective local cooperation and the strengthening of the Christian community. All of these humanitarian actions, diplomatic activities and advocacy for peace have helped to maintain the presence of Christians in their native lands, the cradle of Christian faith in the Middle East. In the framework of his activities, Fr Halemba has promoted several information websites (primarily the Nineveh Reconstruction Committee and the Christians of Syria). He is also the creator of the ACNaid, an advanced digital system for project management and auditing. As a scientist, Fr Halemba conducts research documenting the persecution and genocide of Christians in the Middle East, as well as sociological and ethnographic research.

=== International Initiative “Our Way to God” ===
The missionary ministry of Fr Halemba resulted in the creation of the International Initiative "Our way to God" in 2020. This initiative aims at helping all those who are searching to know God, Christian faith and receive baptism. It sets out to share the Good News about God to each and every person without exception. " Our way to God" initiative led to the launch of a series of Bible catechesis, based on the tradition of the Church, intended for Arabic-speaking baptism candidates. This vademecum for the catechumen, authored by Fr Michel Sakr and Fr Antoine Assaf, was published in the form of a book, audio-book, website page and as an internet application, and it has also been translated in bilingual versions: Arabic-English, Arabic-French, Arabic-German, Arabic-Italian and Arabic-Spanish, Arabic-Polish and Persian-German. On 1 March 2022, he met with Greek Orthodox Patriarch of Antioch John X, Bishop Ephraim Maalouli, and former Melkite Greek Catholic Church Archbishop Issam John Darwich in order to review the initiative's efforts in the region.

=== Decorations and Distinctions ===
- 2015 - honorific title of Archimandrite (granted by S.E. Issam John Darwish, Archbishop of the Melkite Greek Catholic Archeparchy of Zahle and Forzol in Lebanon).
- 2019 - honourable distinction in the Inside the Vatican magazine (for 10 people, who through their words and life, are witnesses to the hope that God exists and comes to save His people, granted every year by the Inside the Vatican magazine which aims to give insight into world affairs and the heart of the Church).
- 2019 - Golden Cross of Merit awarded by the President of the Republic of Poland (for activities for people in need of help and support).
- 2019 - Gold Medal of the Cardinal Stefan Wyszyński University, in recognition of support for, cooperation and development of the Cardinal Stefan Wyszyński University in Warsaw.
- 2019 - Award Pro Redemptione, in recognition of his work for the persecuted and needy Christians, awarded by the quarterly "Homo Dei" to priests serving abroad.
- 2020 - honorific title of Chorepiscopos - equivalent to monsignor in the Western (Latin) Church (granted by Chaldean Catholic Patriarch Louis Cardinal Raphael I Sako of Baghdad).

== Publications ==
- Icipangano Cipya (New Testament in Mambwe). Ndola: Mission Franciscan, Mission Press Ndola. 1991.
- Niektóre aspekty inkulturacji ludu Mambwe w świetle adhortacji Pawła VI Africae terrarum [Some aspects of the inculturation of the Mambwe people in the light of Paul VI's exhortation Africae terrarum] (in Polish). mps. 1993.
- Zagadnienia inkulturacji w Afryce w okresie powstania orędzia Africae terrarum" Pawła VI", SSHT 25/26(1992/93) [Questions of inculturation in Africa at the time of the creation of the message Africae terrarum of Paul VI, SSHT 25/26 (1992/93)] (in Polish).
- Mambwe-English Dictionary. Ndola: Franciscan Mission Press Ndola. 1994. ISBN 9982-07-047-9.
- Diecezjalne dzieło misyjne a udział diecezji katowickiej w misji ad gentes Kościoła powszechnego, w: W. Świątkiewicz, Kościół śląski wspólnotą misyjną [Diocesan missionary work and the participation of the Katowice diocese in the ad gentes mission of the universal Church, in: W. Świątkiewicz, The Silesian Church as a missionary community] (in Polish). Katowice: Societas Scientiis Favendis Silesiae Superioris - Instytut Górnośląski. 1995.
- "Oczekiwania Kościoła w Afryce u progu roku 2000 w świetle Synodu Afryki i Adhortacji Apostolskiej Ecclesia in Africa" [The expectations of the Church in Africa at the threshold of the year 2000 in the light of the Synod of Africa and the Apostolic Exhortation Ecclesia in Africa]. Nurt SVD. 30. Warsaw: Verbinum: 3–32. 1996. ISSN 1233-9717.
- J. Guzowski, ed. (1997). "Wkład polskich misjonarzy i misjonarek w dzieło misyjne Kościoła powszechnego" [The contribution of Polish missionaries to the missionary work of the universal Church]. Misyjne zadania Kościoła w Polsce [Missionary tasks of the Church in Poland].
- Kościół misyjny, Podstawowe stadium misjologii [Missionary Church, Basic Missiology Studies] (in Polish). Warsaw: Missio-Polonia. 1997. ISBN 83-8627-115-9. [original: Following Christ in Mission. A foundational Course in Missiology, Sebastian Karotempler]
- Różański Jarosław (2003). "Historia i znaczenie przekładu Nowego Testamentu na język Mambwe" [The history and significance of the translation of the New Testament into the Mambwe language]. In J. Różański (ed.). A. Halemba, Między przekładem biblijnym a teologią afrykańską [A. Halemba, Between biblical translation and African theology]. Warsaw: Komisja Episkopatu Polski ds. Misji. ISBN 83-7232-420-4.
- Różański Jarosław, ed. (2003). Wybrane problemy szkolnictwa w Afryce Subsaharyjskiej [Selected Problems of Education in Sub-Saharan Africa] (in Polish). Warsaw: Komisja Episkopatu Polski ds. Misji. ISBN 83-7232-421-2.
- Mambwe Folk-tales. Warsaw: Oficyna Wydawniczo-Poligraficzna "Adam". 2005.
  - Mambwe version: ISBN 83-7232-626-6
  - English version: ISBN 83-7232-625-8
- Religious and ethical values in the proverbs of the Mambwe people, Zambia PART I. Warsaw: Oficyna Wydawniczo-Poligraficzna "Adam". 2005.
  - Part I: ISBN 83-7232-627-4
  - Part II: ISBN 83-7232-628-2
- Amapepo ya Cîta ca Minsa, Mu Cimambwe (Zambia). Mysłowice-Brzęczkowice: mps. 2006.
- English-Mambwe Dictionary and Mambwe Grammar. Warsaw: Oficyna Wydawniczo-Poligraficzna "Adam". 2007. ISBN 978-83-7232756-7.
- Umulungu Utakatifu Uwanda ukulu wlpasaka Myaka A,B,C. Warsaw: Oficyna Wydawniczo-Poligraficzna "Adam". 2011. ISBN 978-83-7232-996-7.
- Amapepo pa Wanda wakwe Leza na manda akulu. Mwaka C. Warsaw: Oficyna Wydawniczo-Poligraficzna "Adam". 2011.
  - Mwaka A: ISBN 978-83-7232-985-1
  - Mwaka B: ISBN 978-83-7232-990-5
  - Mwaka C: ISBN 978-83-7232-991-2
