= Bieruń =

Town in Silesian Voivodeship, Poland

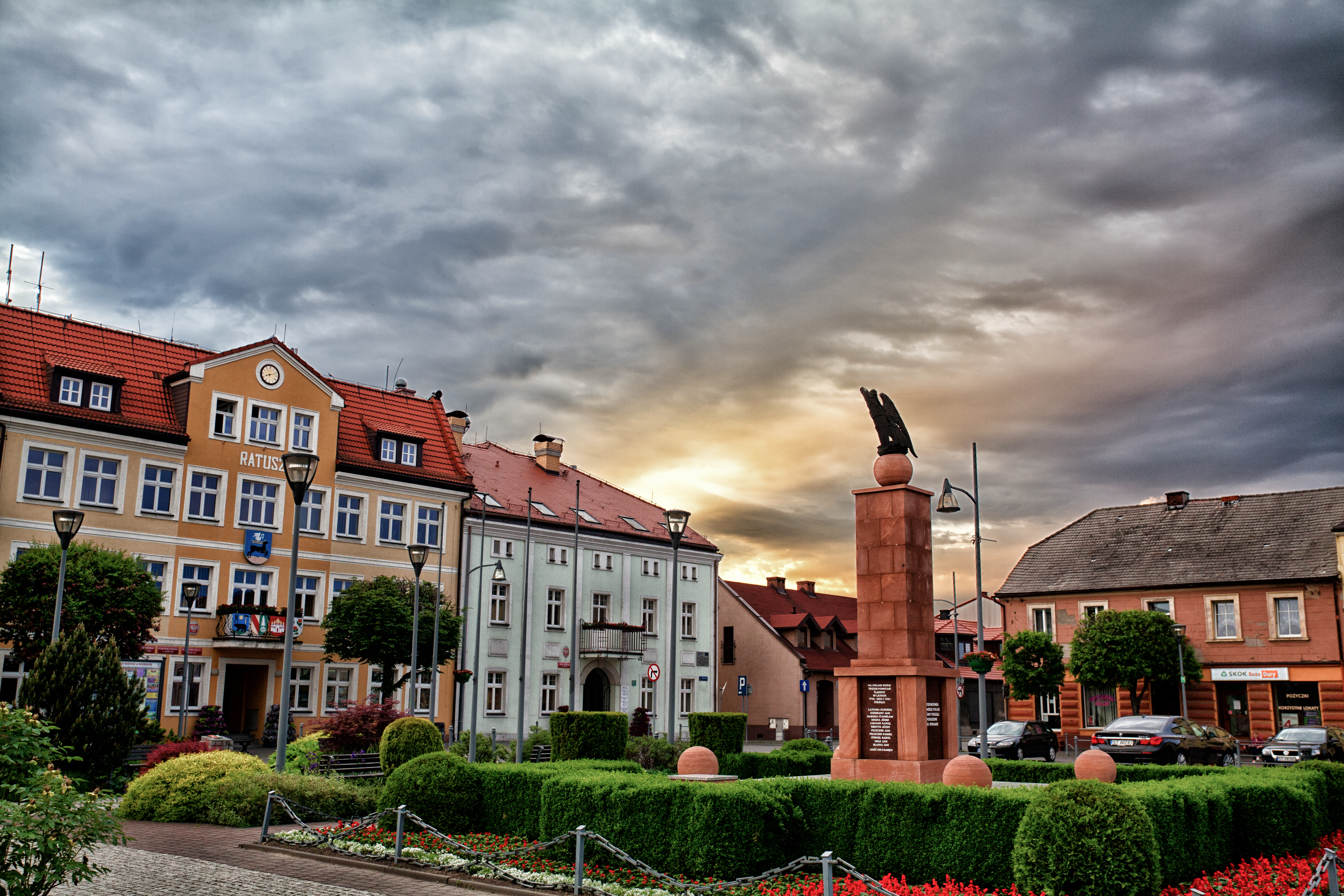
- Market square in Bieruń

- Coat of arms

- Location within Poland Location within Silesian Voivodeship
- Coordinates: 50°8′N 19°6′E
- Country: Poland
- Voivodeship: Silesian
- County: Bieruń-Lędziny
- Gmina: Bieruń (urban gmina)
- Town rights: 1387

Government
  - Mayor: Krystian Grzesica

Area
  - City: 40.49 km^{2} (15.63 sq mi)

Population (31 December 2021)
  - City: 19,334
  - Density: 478/km^{2} (1,240/sq mi)
  - Urban: 2,746,000
  - Metro: 5,294,000
- Time zone: UTC+1 (CET)
  - Summer (DST): UTC+2 (CEST)
- Postal code: 43-150, 43-155, 43-156
- Area code: +48 32
- Car plates: SBL
- Website: http://www.bierun.pl

Bieruń [ˈbʲɛruɲ] (German: Berun, Silesian: Bieruń) is a town in Upper Silesia, in southern Poland, seat of the Bieruń-Lędziny County in the Silesian Voivodeship. It is located about 25 km (16 mi) south of Katowice.

== Geography ==
It is located in the Silesian Highlands, on the Gostynia river, a tributary of the Vistula. It is located in the southern part of the Metropolis GZM - metropolis with a population of about 2 million. Bieruń is one of the towns of the 2.7 million conurbation – the Katowice urban area, and within the greater Katowice-Ostrava metropolitan area populated by about 5,294,000 people. The population of the town itself is 19,334 (December 2021). Bieruń includes dzielnicas Bieruń Stary, Bieruń Nowy, Ściernie, Jajosty, Bijasowice and Czarnuchowice and is bordered with Lędziny, Tychy, Chełm Śląski, Bojszowy and Oświęcim.

== History ==
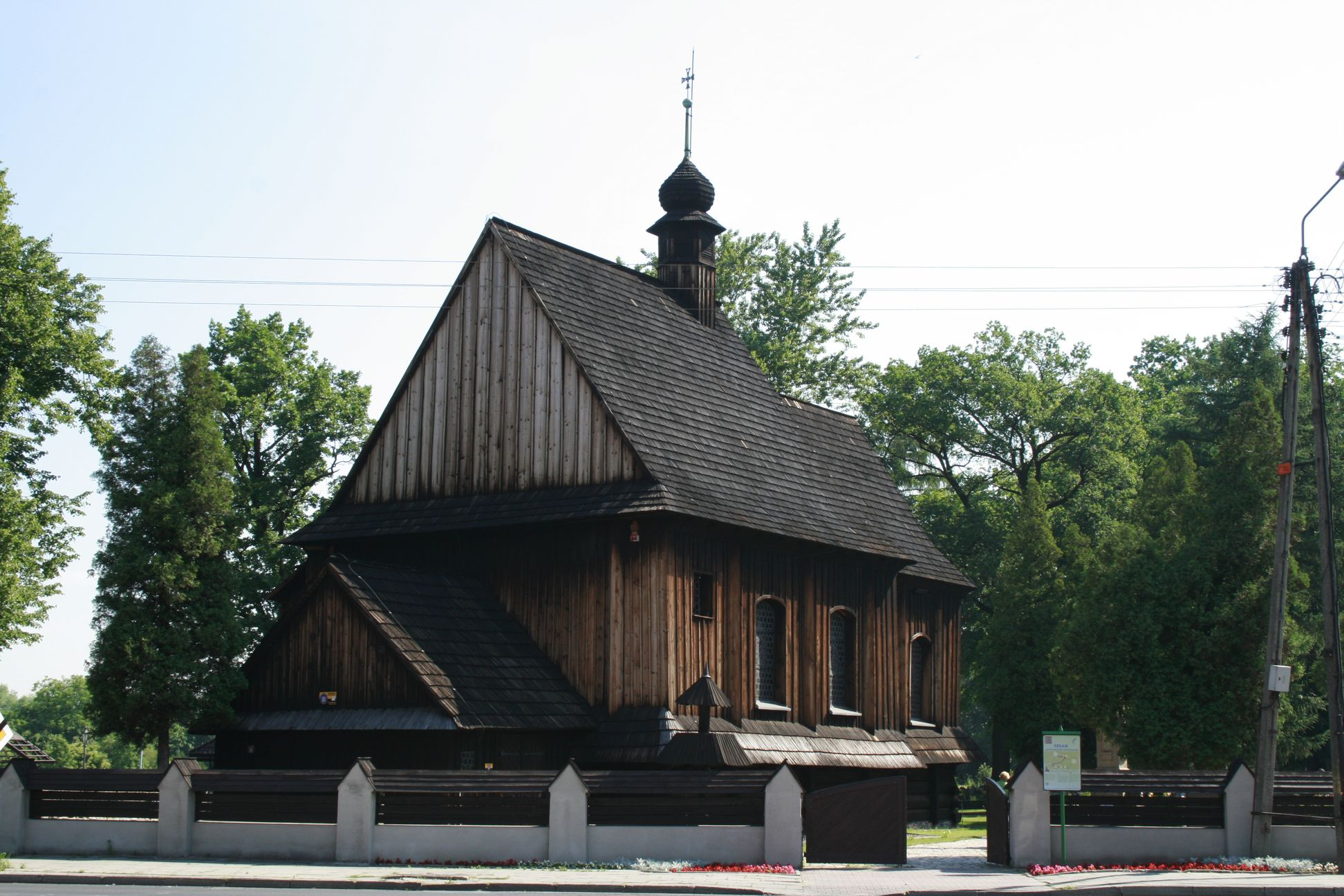
Sanctuary of Saint Valentine

The territory became part of the emerging Polish state in the 10th century. Following the fragmentation of Poland, it formed part of various Piast-ruled provincial duchies of Poland, incl. Opole and Racibórz. Bieruń Stary was the location of a motte-and-bailey castle from the 13th–14th century, which is now an archaeological site. In the 14th century, it passed under Bohemian rule. The settlement of Berouna was first mentioned in a 1376 deed. The name is most probably related to the, similarly spelled, Slavic deity Perun, remains of its cultic place still present at nearby Lędziny. John II, the Přemyslid duke of Racibórz granted it town privileges in 1387. Later on, it returned to the Polish dukes of the Piast dynasty as part of the united Duchy of Opole and Racibórz. After the extinction of the Opole line of the Piasts, in 1532, Bieruń was incorporated by the Habsburg monarchy.

With most of Silesia, it was conquered by Prussia in the First Silesian War of 1740–42 and afterwards incorporated into the Silesia Province. In the mid-19th century, the town's population was predominantly Catholic by confession. On 18 June 1845, a fire destroyed large areas of the town; King Frederick William IV of Prussia personally donated 9000 talers for its reconstruction. Cigarette and munitions factories were set up in the town in the mid-19th century. It became part of the German Empire in 1871 under the Germanized name Berun. In Polish it was known as both Bieruń and Beruń. Seven annual fairs were held in the town in the late 19th century. Located near the border with Lesser Poland and Austrian Silesia, Berun until 1919 was the most southeasterly town of Germany.

After the restoration of independent Poland in 1918, the Third Silesian Uprising of 1921 and the subsequent Upper Silesia plebiscite (in which 82.1% of residents of Bieruń Stary, 58.2% in Bieruń Nowy, 95.5% in Czarnuchowice, 89.1% in Ściernie, and 84.6% in Bijasowice voted for Poland), Bieruń was reintegrated with Poland, within which it formed part of the Silesian Voivodeship.

Following the joint German-Soviet invasion of Poland, which started World War II in September 1939, the town was occupied by Germany until 1945. After the war it was administratively part of the Katowice Voivodeship until 1998. From 1975 until 1991 it was a district of the neighbouring Tychy municipality.

== Sports ==
The local football clubs are Unia Bieruń and Piast Bieruń. Both compete in the lower leagues.

== Twin towns and sister cities ==
Bieruń is twinned with:

- Gundelfingen, Germany, since 1997
- Meung-sur-Loire, France since 2008
- Moravský Beroun, Czech Republic, since 1992
- Ostroh, Ukraine, since 2005

== Gallery ==
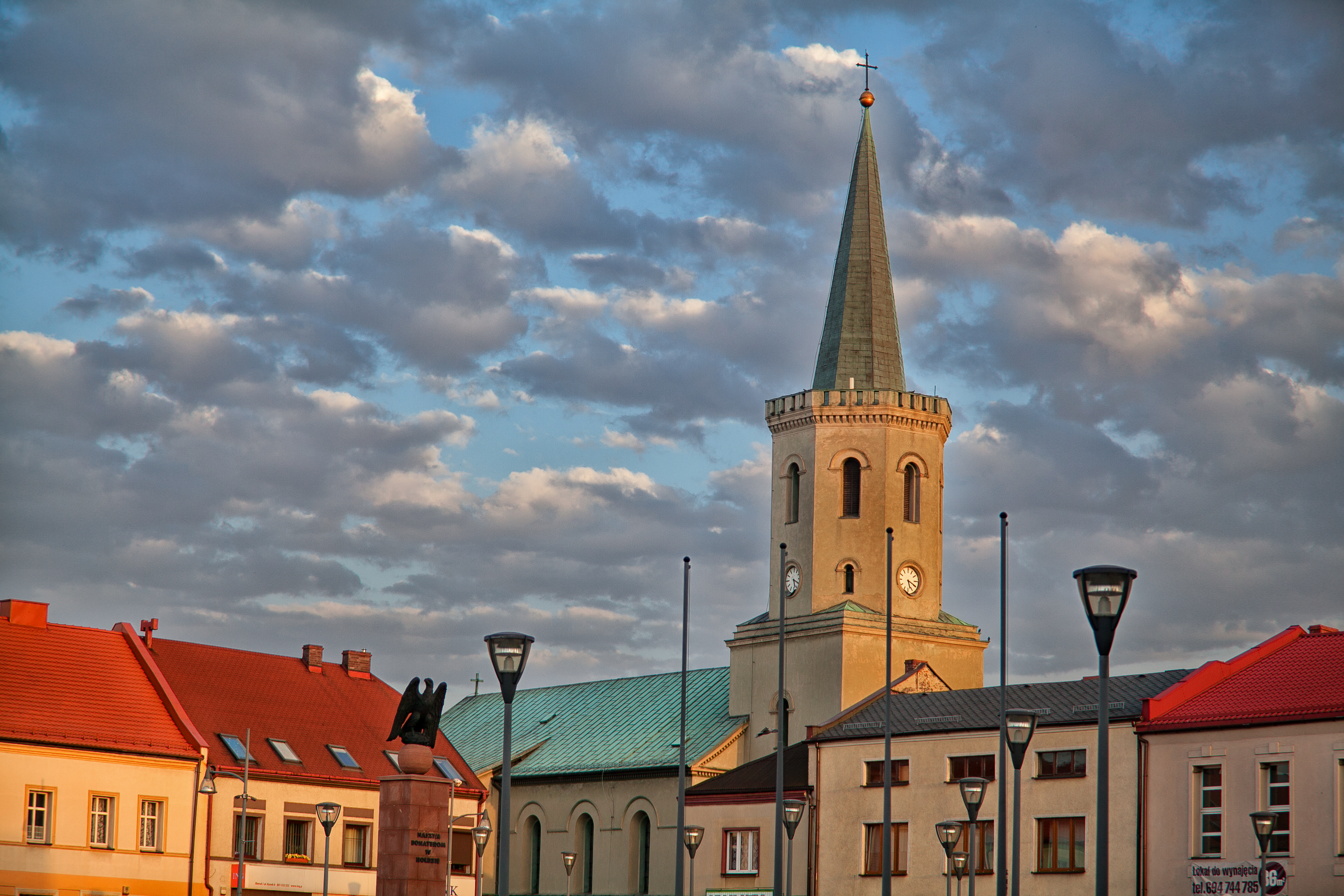
Church of Saint Bartholomew

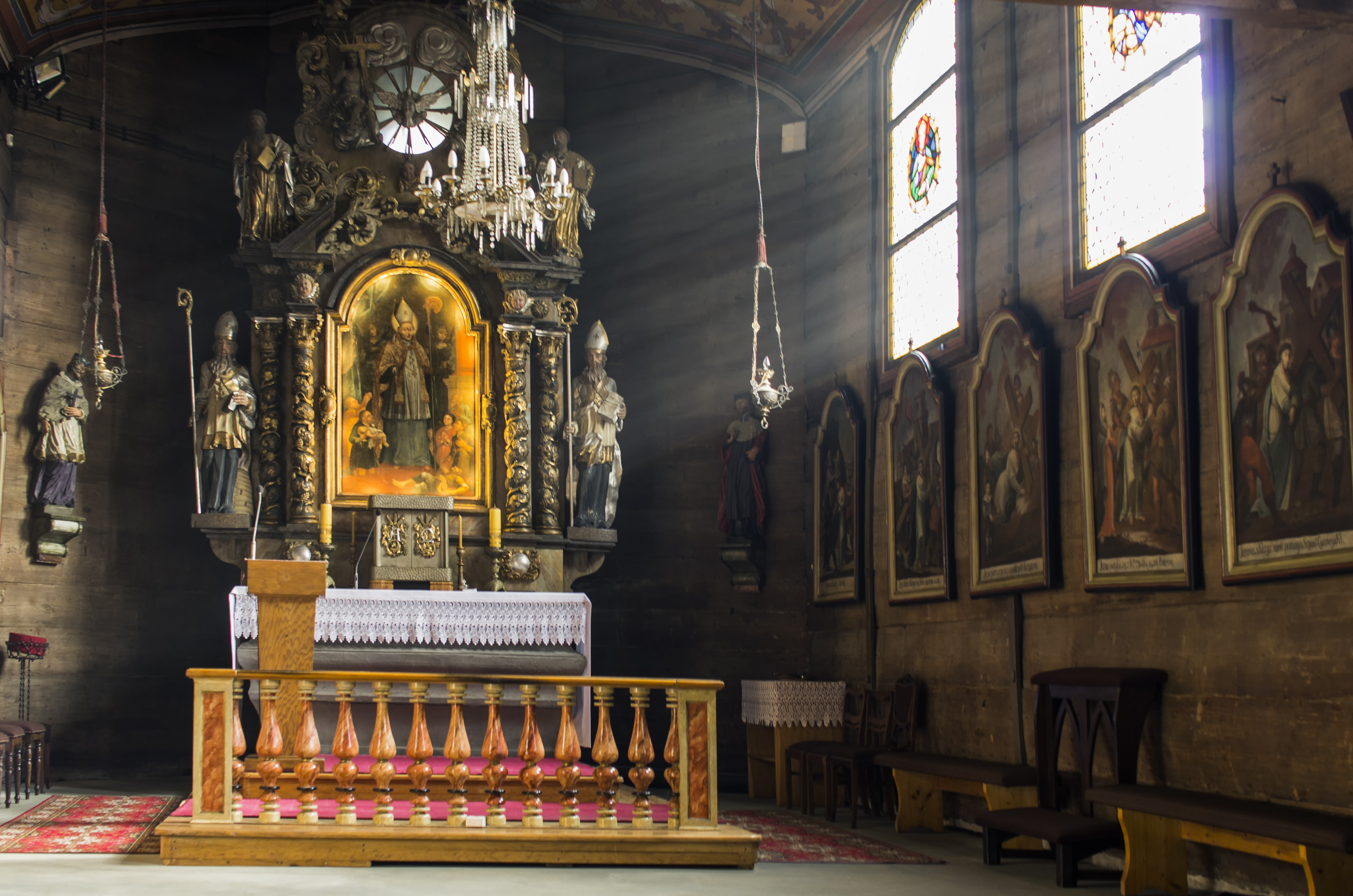
Interior of the Sanctuary of Saint Valentine

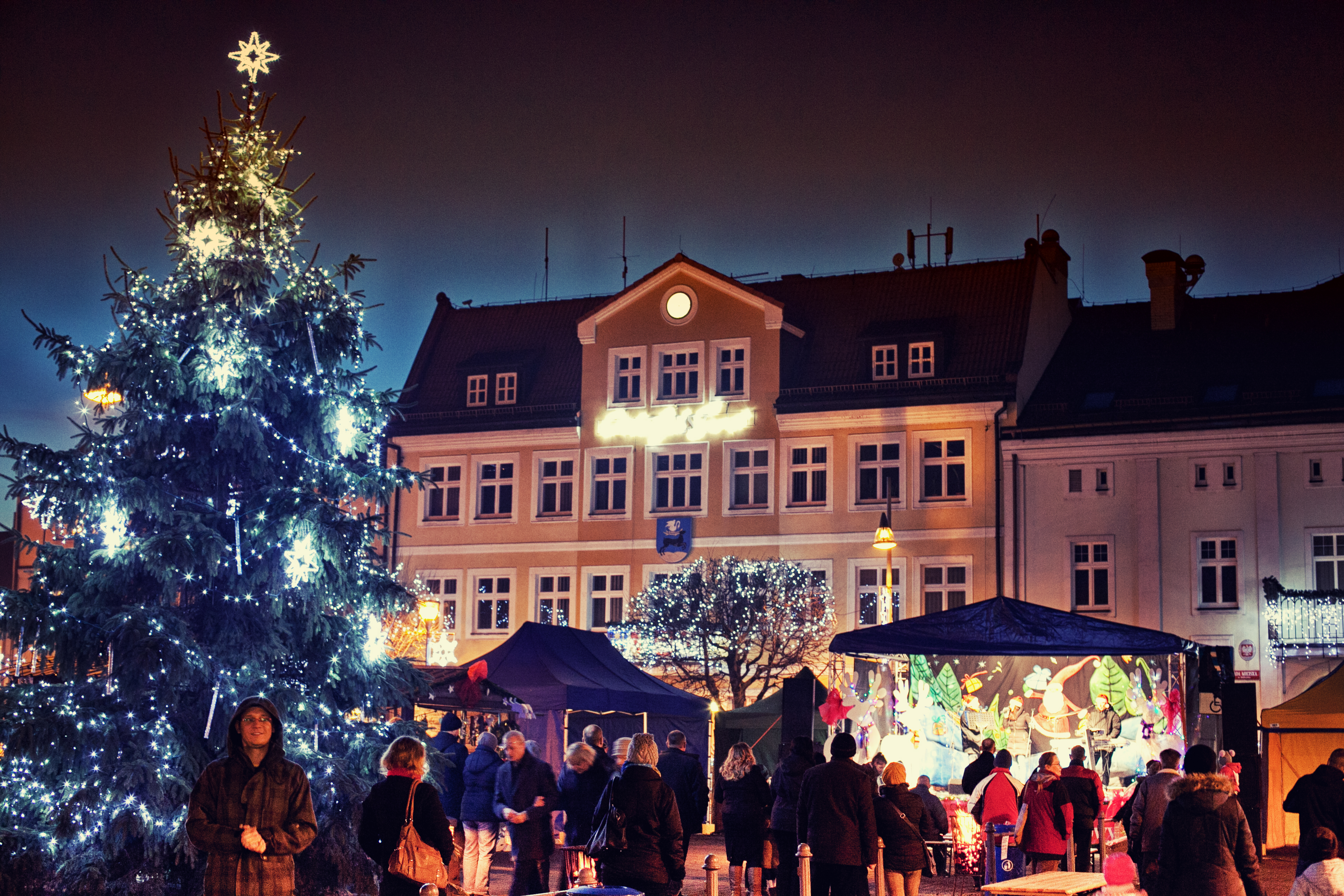
Christmas market

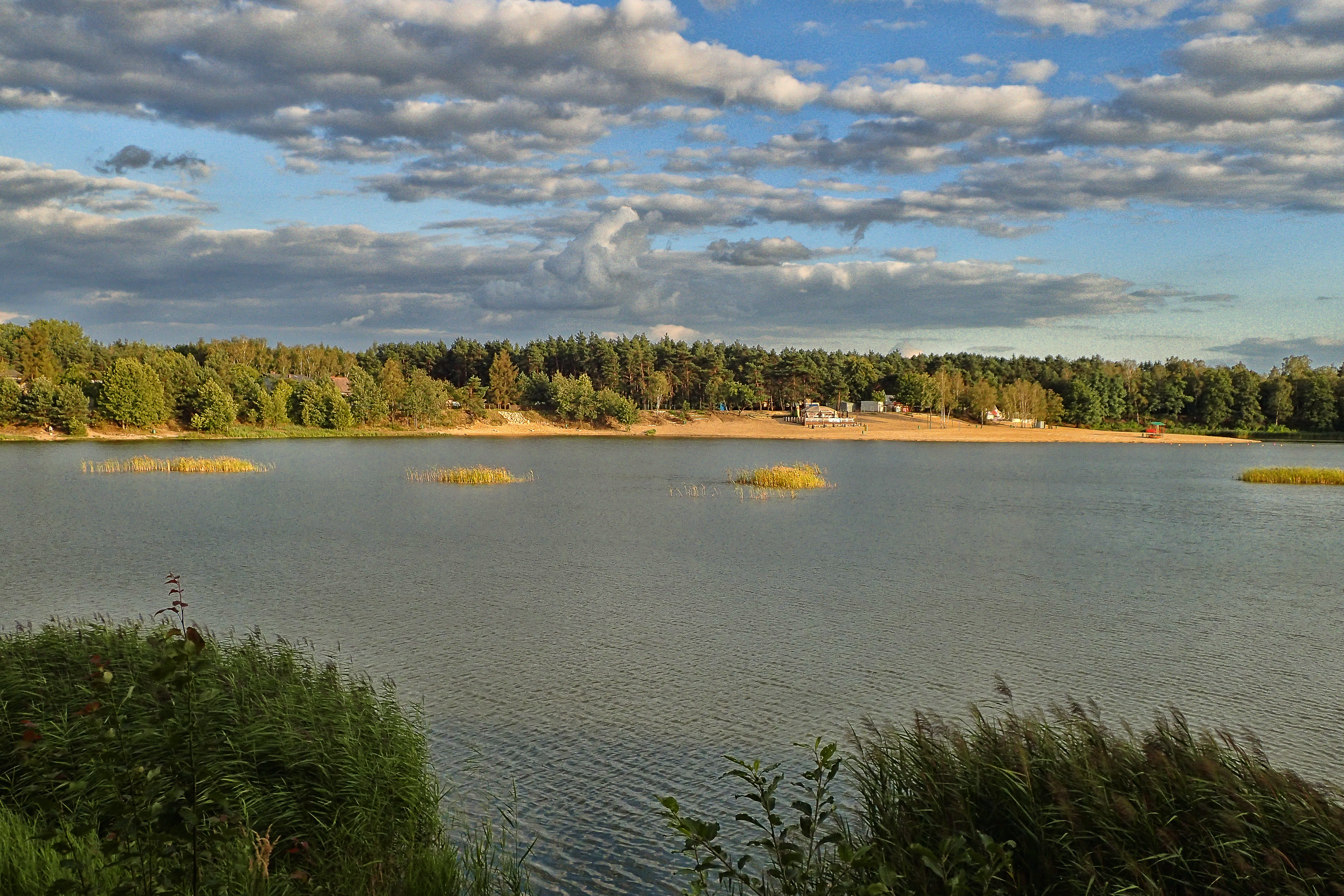
Łysina Lake
