= Bojszowy =

- Village
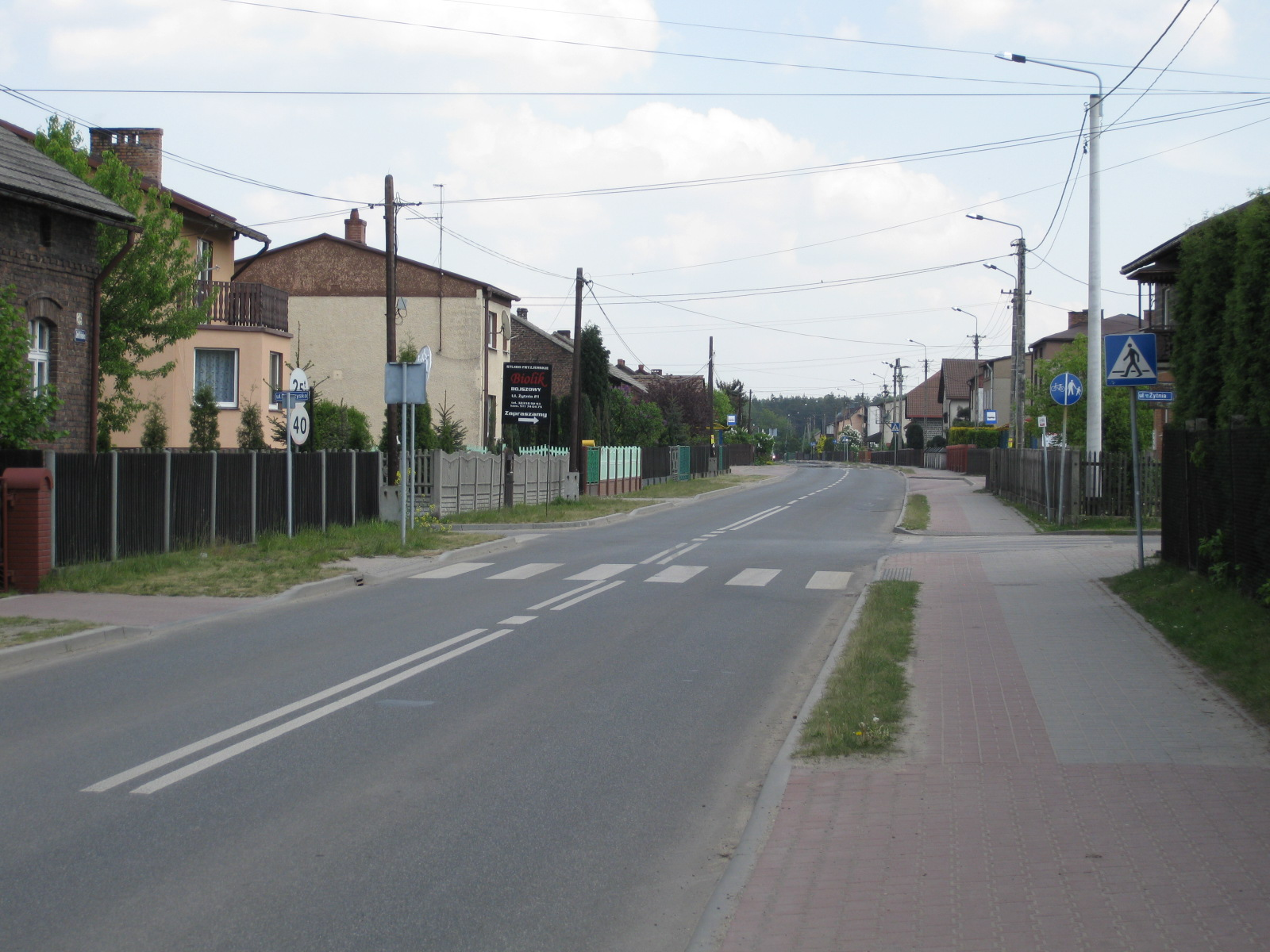
- Jedlińska Street

- Coat of arms

- Location within Poland
- Coordinates: 50°3′N 19°6′E
- Country: Poland
- Voivodeship: Silesian
- County: Bieruń-Lędziny
- Gmina: Bojszowy
- Population: 3,219
- Website: http://www.bojszowy.pl/

Bojszowy [bɔi̯ˈʂɔvɨ] (Silesian: Bōj) is a village in Bieruń-Lędziny County, Silesian Voivodeship, in southern Poland. It is the seat of the gmina (administrative district) called Gmina Bojszowy.

== History ==
The settlement was first mentioned as Boyschow in a 1368 deed issued by John I of Opava, Duke of Racibórz.

During the political upheaval caused by Matthias Corvinus the land around Pszczyna was overtaken by Casimir II, Duke of Cieszyn, who sold it in 1517 to the Hungarian magnates of the Thurzó family, forming the Pless state country. In the accompanying sales document issued on 21 February 1517, the village was mentioned as Boyssowy. The Kingdom of Bohemia in 1526 became part of the Habsburg monarchy. In the War of the Austrian Succession most of Silesia was conquered by the Kingdom of Prussia, including the village.

Bojszowy passed to the Second Polish Republic upon the 1921 Upper Silesian plebiscite. From 1977 until 1991, it was part of the neighbouring Tychy municipality.
