= Bieruń-Lędziny County =

Bieruń-Lędziny County Powiat bieruńsko-lędziński
- County
- Flag Coat of arms

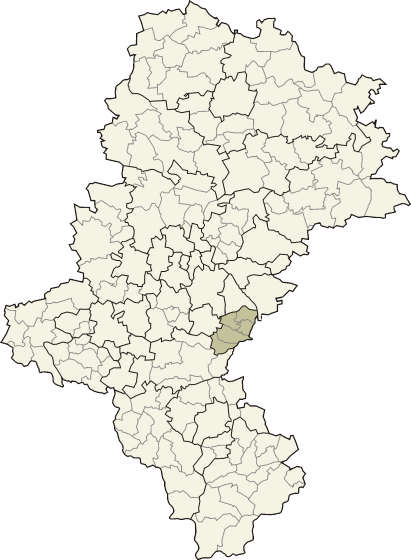
- Location within the voivodeship
- Coordinates (Bieruń): 50°8′N 19°6′E
- Country: Poland
- Voivodeship: Silesian
- Seat: Bieruń
- Gminas: Total 5 (incl. 3 urban): Bieruń; Imielin; Lędziny; Gmina Bojszowy; Gmina Chełm Śląski

Area
  - Total: 156.68 km^{2} (60.49 sq mi)

Population (2019-06-30)
  - Total: 59,715
  - Density: 381.13/km^{2} (987.11/sq mi)
  - Urban: 45,490
  - Rural: 14,225
- Car plates: SBL
- Website: www.powiatbl.pl

Bieruń-Lędziny County (Polish: powiat bieruńsko-lędziński) is a unit of territorial administration and local government (powiat) in Silesian Voivodeship, southern Poland. It came into being on January 1, 1999, as a result of the Polish local government reforms passed in 1998. Its administrative seat and largest town is Bieruń, which lies 15 kilometres (9 mi) south-east of the regional capital Katowice. The county also contains the towns of Lędziny, lying 2 km (1 mi) south-east of Bieruń, and Imielin, 7 km (4 mi) east of Bieruń.

Before 2002 the county had its seat in the city of Tychy (outside the county), and was called Tychy County (powiat tyski).

The county covers an area of 156.68 square kilometres (60.5 sq mi). As of 2019 its total population is 59,715, out of which the population of Bieruń is 19,539, that of Lędziny is 16,776, that of Imielin is 9,175, and the rural population is 14,225.

== Neighbouring counties ==
Bieruń-Lędziny County is bordered by the cities of Mysłowice and Jaworzno to the north, Oświęcim County to the east, Pszczyna County to the south, and the cities of Tychy and Katowice to the west.

== Administrative divisions ==
Map of Bieruń-Lędziny County

The county is subdivided into five gminas (three urban and two rural). These are listed in the following table, in descending order of population.

| Gmina | Type | Area (km^{2}) | Population (2019) | Seat |
|---|---|---|---|---|
| Bieruń | urban | 40.3 | 19,539 | |
| Lędziny | urban | 32.0 | 16,776 | |
| Imielin | urban | 28.0 | 9,175 | |
| Gmina Bojszowy | rural | 34.1 | 7,899 | Bojszowy |
| Gmina Chełm Śląski | rural | 23.2 | 6,326 | Chełm Śląski |
