= Malgré-nous =

Men from Alsace-Lorraine conscripted into the Nazi German army

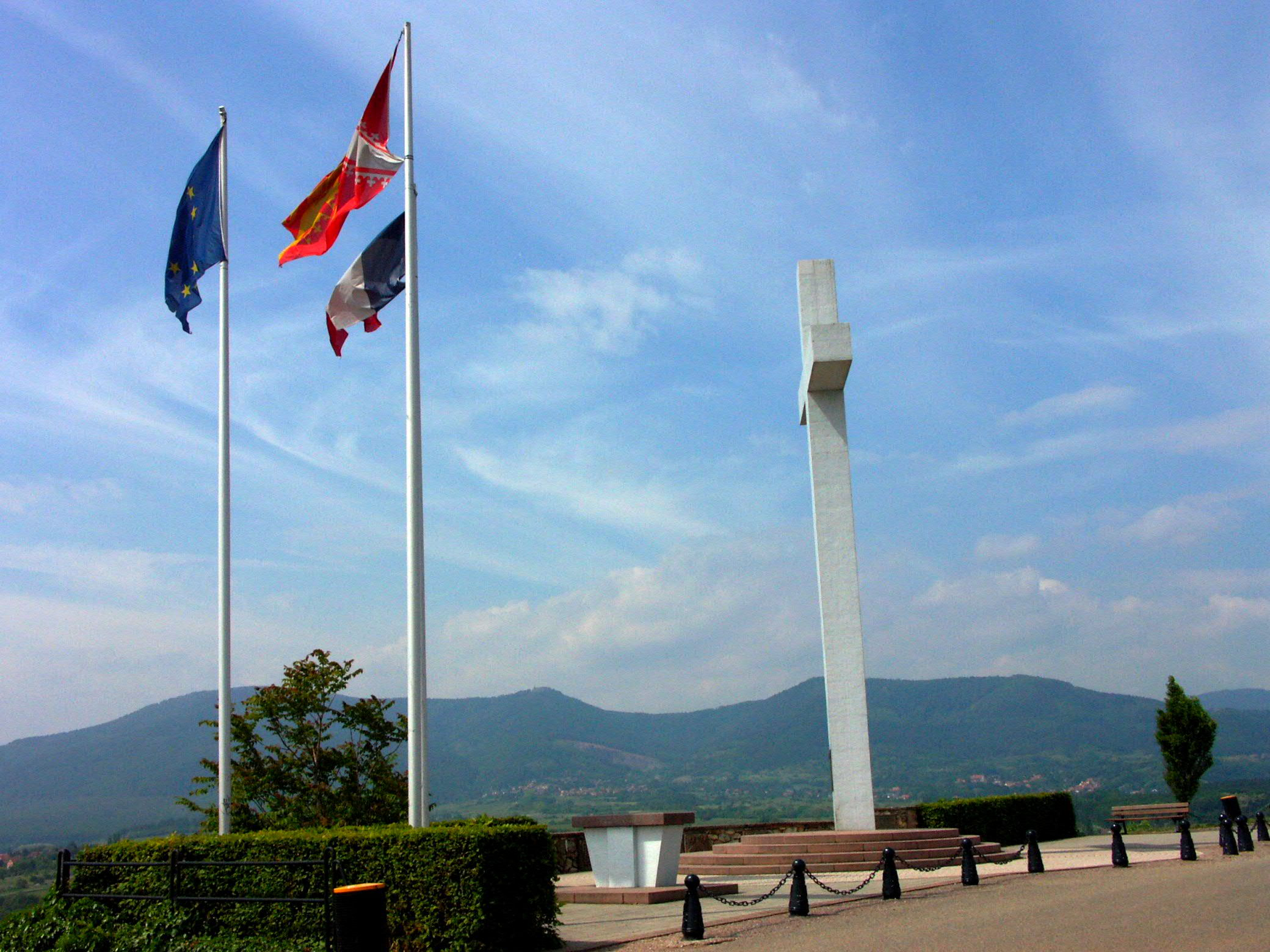
Monument to the Malgré-nous in Obernai, Bas-Rhin

The Malgré-nous (French pronunciation: [malɡʁe nu], lit. 'despite ourselves' or, more figuratively, 'we who are forced against our will') were men conscripted into the German military from Alsace–Lorraine after the region's annexation from France during World War II. They are sometimes referred to as the "forced enlistees" (French: les enrolés de force).

== History ==
Based on orders from Gauleiter Robert Heinrich Wagner, the regional military governor of Alsace, of 25 August 1942, some 100,000 Alsatians and 30,000 Mosellans were drafted by force into the German armed forces. Heller and Simpson (2013) say:

Forced enrollment was organized in Alsace largely because of the disappointing number of Alsatians volunteering for the SS (at most 2,000). The fear from the high loss rates of the German Wehrmacht especially in Russia, were the most important point to stay away from any form of volunteering in German military units. Additionally, many men who refused conscription saw their "entire family...deported after they refused to serve".

Most of those were sent to the Eastern Front. A smaller number served in the Waffen-SS.

Some Malgré-nous deserted the Wehrmacht to join the French Resistance or escape to Switzerland, thereby running the risk of having their families sent to work or concentration camps by the Germans. According to historian David Kaplan, 40,000 "either avoided the draft or deserted once in uniform". This threat obliged the majority of them to remain in the German army. After the war, they were often accused of being traitors or collaborationists. In July 1944, 1,500 Malgré-nous were released from Soviet captivity and sent to Algiers, where they joined the Free French Forces.

Thirteen Malgré-nous were involved in the massacre of Oradour-sur-Glane together with one genuine volunteer from Alsace. In a trial in Bordeaux in 1953 they were sentenced to prison terms between 5–11 years, while the volunteer was sentenced to death. The trial caused major civil unrest in Alsace, as most of the Malgré-nous had, by definition, been forced to serve in the Waffen-SS; public pressure led to a re-examination of the convictions, ultimately resulting in a general amnesty by the French National Assembly on 19 February 1953.

Of the estimated 130,000 Malgré-nous, some 32,000 were killed in action and 10,500 are still missing in action (and presumed dead). Those captured on the Eastern Front were held by the Soviet Union at a POW camp near Tambov, among other locations. According to Soviet Statistics, just under 22,000 were repatriated to France after the end of the war. The vast majority of POWs were sent home within a year. The last POWs were released in 1955; the late returnees were those convicted of war or other crimes. Forty thousand of the Malgré-nous were invalids after the war.

== Malgré-elles ==
The terms malgré-elles and incorporées de force refer to women from Alsace and Moselle who were also forcibly conscripted into Nazi civil and military organisations for the German war effort.

In 2012, a TV film Malgré-elles directed by Denis Malleval was released.

== See also ==
- Poles in the Wehrmacht
- 1942 Luxembourgish general strike
- Guy Sajer
