= Military enrolment in German-occupied Poland =

1939–1945 policies during WWII

Aftermath of the Nazi-Soviet attack; divisions of Poland into spheres of interest

After Nazi Germany's invasion of Poland in 1939, the Wehrmacht, or German armed forces, recruited members from Poland's 2.2% ethnic-German minority, but did not enlist ethnic Poles on racist grounds. When Germany began losing the war in 1943, the Wehrmacht forcibly conscripted ethnic Poles, who were commanded with racist policies against them.

Nazi Germany regarded Poland's ethnic-German minority as racially superior Volksdeutsche, and ethnic Poles as subhuman. In addition to murdering 3 million Polish Jews in the Shoah, Germany carried out genocide against the ethnic Poles; at least 1.9 million were murdered, especially those in influential and leadership roles, while the rest were exploited for their labor, including in the military.

The Wehrmacht High Command did not trust the ethnic Poles under their command, who, when taken prisoner by the Allies, tended to enlist in the Polish Army in exile. Nearly 90,000 Poles forcibly conscripted into the Wehrmacht subsequently fought against Nazi Germany in the Polish Armed Forces in the West. By Victory Day 1945, nearly a third of the Polish soldiers in the West had formerly served in the German military. On the Eastern Front, prisoner-of-war camps for Wehrmacht soldiers were a substantial recruitment pool for the Polish Armed Forces in the East.

The term "grandfather in the Wehrmacht" has become a slur in Poland. Having served in the German military or being a descendant of such an individual has led in Poland to repression, discrimination, and ostracization. Even in the 21st century, such persons are often seen as not being an integral part of the Polish national community.

== Estimates ==
Some Polish citizens of diverse ethnicities served in the Wehrmacht and the Waffen-SS, in particular in parts of Poland annexed by Germany such as Upper Silesia. Service in the German military was universal in nature in these areas, however, assessing the number of ethnic Poles involved is difficult due to the fluidity of national identity. At the low end, Polish estimates often place the number of native Poles who served at 250,000. Ryszard Kaczmarek of the University of Silesia in Katowice produced a conservative estimate of at least 295,000 based on documentary evidence; however, he considers this very low and is inclined to assume category III Volksliste were mobilized as much as males in the Old Reich, which leads to a maximum estimate of 500,000. Early 1944 estimates by the Polish underground are similar, at 400,000-450,000 Poles from Reichsgau Danzig-West Prussia and Silesia.

On October 24, 1944, Hitler approved the service of Poles in the Wehrmacht under the same rules as for the Osttruppen. On December 4, 1944, Himmler extended this permission to the Waffen SS. Recruitment for the Wehrmacht began in November. As of December 31, 1944, approximately 6,000 Poles from the General Government were part of the two army groups defending Poland.

German authorities assumed those classified as category III Volksliste were in fact mostly ethnically Polish, and marked their military documents with "Pole".

== Motivation ==
Various factors contributed to Poles serving in the Wehrmacht. From the Nazi perspective, racial theory saw Kashubians and Silesians as Eingedeutschte. Serving in the Wehrmacht was not motivated solely by a desire for collaboration, but often resulted from the need to adapt to a complex and changing situation, and in some cases was done for opportunistic reasons. In 1943-1945, German losses at the front led to liberalization of the Nazi racial rules and mass recruitment of Poles.

In the annexed areas, registration as Volksliste was not only encouraged by the German authorities, but also by the Polish Underground State and Catholic Church who wanted to preserve the Polish character of these lands by preventing mass deportation of their inhabitants. Thus, in the Katowice district, 1.4 million people registered in the Volksliste. The number of residents who refused registration was relatively negligible.

There was also a German storm brigade known as the Volksdeutscher Selbstschutz formed by the German minority in Poland. Many of its members were trained in the Third Reich. As soon as the war started, the Selbstschutz engaged in widespread massacres of Poles and Jews in West Prussia, Upper Silesia and Reichsgau Wartheland, together with the Einsatzgruppen.

== Polish Armed Forces ==
On the Western Front, Polish prisoners were first encountered by the allies in prisoner-of-war camp for Afrika Korps soldiers. After realizing that a high number of prisoners were Polish, the British and the Polish Armed Forces in the West created a special section aimed at recruiting POWs to serve the allied cause. Recruitment efforts intensified in the summer of 1943.

In January 1944, after Henry Maitland Wilson expressed concern over the lack of Polish replacement troops, General Władysław Anders assured him replacements would be recruited at the front lines. In the Polish II Corps, there were 2,500 ex-POWs by June 1944, a number which rose to 18,500 by 1945. Anders' optimism was well-founded, and thanks to POW recruitment the Polish army in the West ended the war as a larger formation than it had started as when the Italian campaign began. Aside from recruits from the Wehrmacht, the Anders Army also absorbed 176 former soldiers from the 14th Waffen Grenadier Division of the SS (1st Galician).

Ultimately, nearly 90,000 Poles formerly employed by the Wehrmacht served in the Polish Armed Forces in the West. By Victory Day in 1945, nearly a third of Polish soldiers in the West had formerly served in the German military.

On the Eastern Front, prisoner-of-war camps for Wehrmacht soldiers were a significant recruitment pool for the Polish Armed Forces in the East.

== Treatment of recaptured deserters ==
Germans treated those Poles who have deserted their armed forces and then subsequently been captured not as POWs but as deserters, to be put on trial.

== Postwar ==
Having served in the German military or being a descendant of such an individual ("grandfather in the Wehrmacht") has led in Poland to repression, discrimination and ostracization. Even in the 21st century, such persons are often seen as not being an integral part of the Polish national community.

During the 2005 Polish presidential election, Donald Tusk was attacked by the Law and Justice party's Jacek Kurski on account of Tusk's grandfather having served in the Wehrmacht.

== Examples of Poles in the Wehrmacht: (Heer, Luftwaffe, Kriegsmarine) ==
Drinking water station in North Africa, 1942. It is marked in Italian, German and Polish, indicating the number of Poles on the Axis side in the North African campaign.

Tony Halik - Incorporated into the Wehrmacht LW in 1943. (Reichsgau Danzig-West Prussia)

Sylwester Kaliski - In September 1943 he was incorporated into the Kriegsmarine. (Reichsgau Danzig-West Prussia)

Edmund Giemsa - During World War II he was forced to join the Wehrmacht but deserted and joined the French Resistance from where he joined the Polish Army.(Gau Upper Silesia)

Leon Piesowocki - In 1943, he was called up to serve in the Wehrmacht and sent to Bourg-en-Bresse in France, and then to the vicinity of Livorno in Italy, where he deserted and joined the Allied troops. (Reichsgau Wartheland)

Adam Baworowski - During World War II he was conscripted into the Wehrmacht. Shortly before his death, according to some sources, he gave up his seat on the plane that came to pick up wounded soldiers to another, more seriously injured colleague. He died during the Battle of Stalingrad in 1942. (Reichsgau Wien)

Jan Feliks Bujak - was captured in 1939 and served as forced labour in Aachen until January 1943 when he was conscripted into Grenadier Ersatz Battalion 473. This Battalion was then sent to reinforce 15. Panzer Grenadier Regiment of 29. Panzer Grenadier Division south of Rome. He escaped to US lines in January 1944 and joined 3rd Heavy Machine Gun Battalion (3. DSK) of 3rd Carpathian Division in June 1944 and fought through Ancona, Pesaro and Bologna before transferring to Riddlesworth Polish Camp in Norfolk England in 1947.

Albin Siekierski - Despite not being a citizen of the Reich, he was conscripted into the Wehrmacht and sent to the Eastern Front. He was wounded in the Battle of Kursk. (Gau Upper Silesia)

Gerard Cieślik - In December 1944, he began serving in the Wehrmacht. At the beginning of 1945, he was sent to a unit in Denmark, where he lived in a church and was tasked with protecting one of the bridges. (Gau Upper Silesia)
