= Imielin =

Place in Silesian Voivodeship, Poland

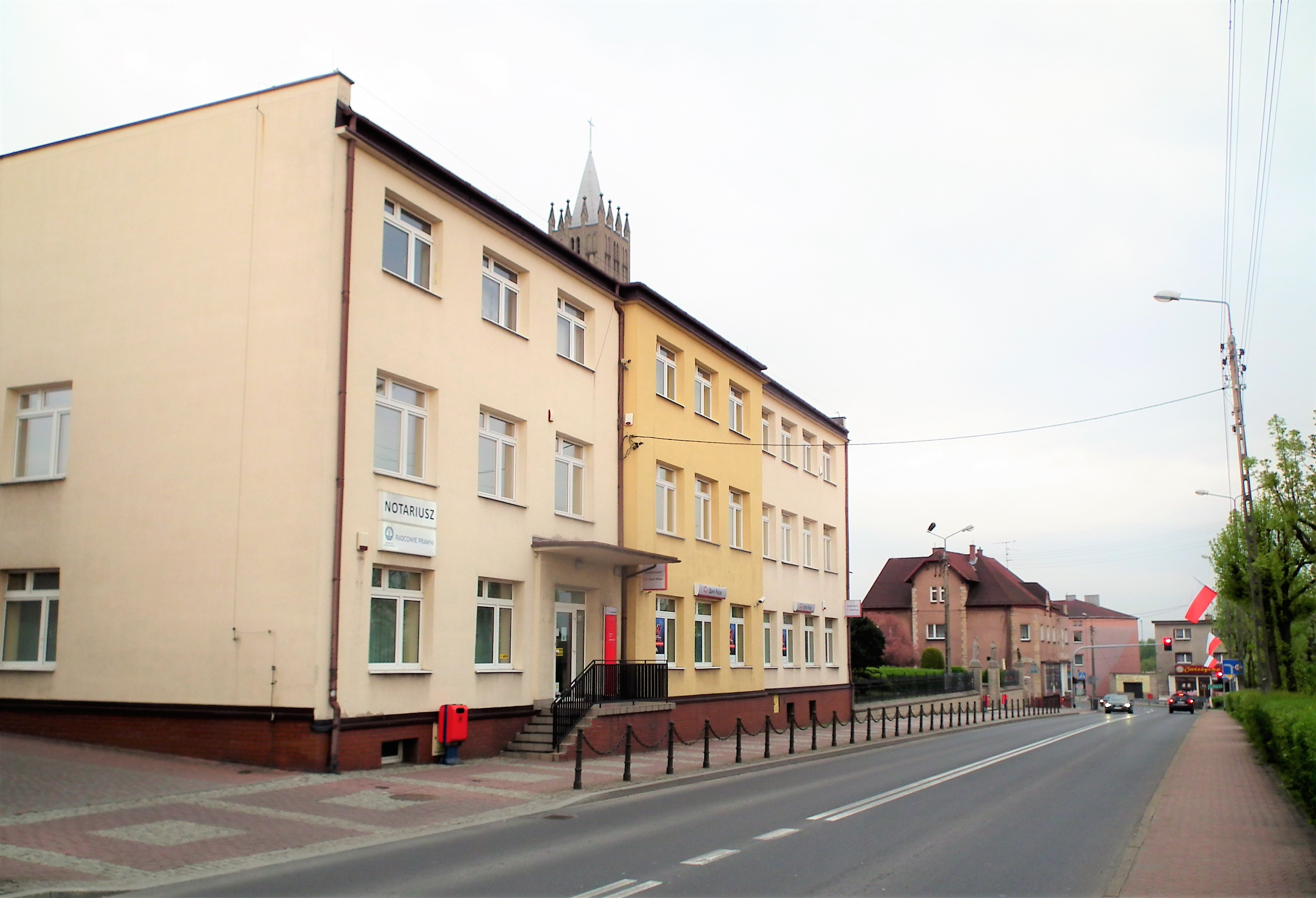
- Town center

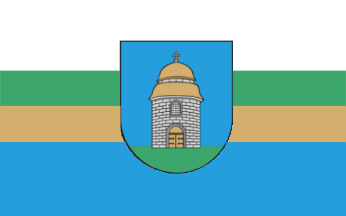
- Flag Coat of arms

- Location within Poland
- Coordinates: 50°8′52″N 19°10′53″E
- Country: Poland
- Voivodeship: Silesian
- County: Bieruń-Lędziny
- Gmina: Imielin (urban gmina)

Area
  - City: 28 km^{2} (11 sq mi)

Population (2019-06-30)
  - City: 9,175
  - Density: 330/km^{2} (850/sq mi)
  - Urban: 2,746,000
  - Metro: 5,294,000
- Postal code: 41-407
- Vehicle registration: SBL
- Website: http://www.imielin.pl

Imielin (Polish pronunciation: [iˈmjɛ.lin]; German: Immenau O.S.; Silesian: Imiylina) is a town in Silesia in southern Poland, near Katowice. Outer town of the Metropolis GZM – metropolis with a population of 2 million. It is located in the Silesian Highlands. The population of the town is 9,098 as of 2021.

== Geography ==
The municipality is situated a short distance to the south-west of Junction 41 on the A4 Highway.

It has been in the Silesian Voivodeship since its formation in 1999, previously having been in the Katowice Voivodeship, and before that, in the Autonomous Silesian Voivodeship. Imielin is one of the towns included in the 2.7 million conurbation – Katowice urban area and within a greater Katowice-Ostrava metropolitan area populated by about 5,294,000 people.

== Economy ==
The area is both industrial and agricultural. There are dolomite deposits and, beneath the flatter area to the south-west of the municipality, coal deposits.

== History ==
=== Late medieval ===
The earliest mention in the records of Imielin dates from 1386. At that time it was part of the Duchy of Racibórz, the eastern border of which was marked by the Przemsza River. Imielin, like the neighbouring villages of Kosztowy and Chełm Śląski was nevertheless isolated from the rest of the duchy by the dense forest which were a feature of the area formed by the sources and headwaters of the Kłodnica and Mleczna rivers. For this reason in 1391 the Duke of Opava-Racibórz gifted this eastern portion of his lands to the Bishop of Kraków.

=== Early modern and nineteenth century ===
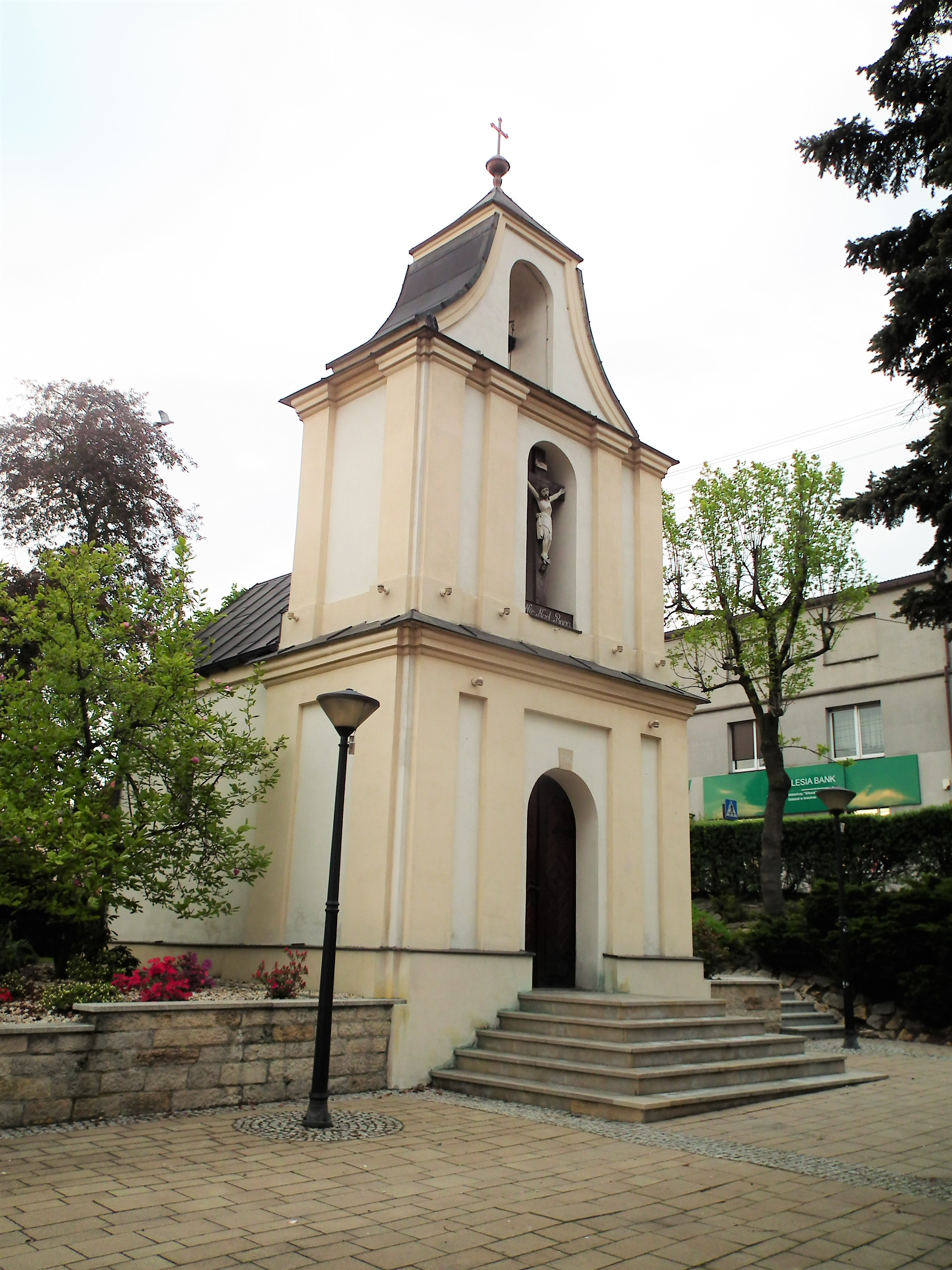
18th-century chapel of Our Lady of Częstochowa

Imielin was annexed by Prussia in the Third Partition of Poland in 1795. In 1796 administrative control and ownership of the land was also transferred to the Prussian crown. In 1802 Alt Gatsch (Stara Gać) was established as a daughter settlement, followed in 1820 by Neu Gatsch (Nova/New Gać).

During the period of pan-European warfare with which the nineteenth century opened, the Napoleonic general Jean Lannes, who had been appointed Prince of Siewierz by the Duchy of Warsaw, asserted control over Imielin, along with Siewierz, citing in support the fact that historically both had belonged to the Bishopric of Kraków. Following the end of the Napoleonic Wars, Imielin was in 1817 returned to Prussia, and in 1818 it was incorporated into the newly created Pleß administrative district.

=== Twentieth century ===
Following World War I, Poland regained independence and control of Imielin. Imielin's excellent transport links to the industrial cities of Katowice, Oświęcim and Tychy enabled it to grow considerably during the twentieth century, both as a residential town for commuters to these larger centres and on account of businesses establishing themselves in Imielin itself. The official population count increased from 2,614 in 1900 to 5,200 in 1931, and to 7,757 in 1970.

During the German Invasion of Poland at the start of World War II in 1939, German soldiers mass murdered 28 Poles on the night of 4 and 5 September. The victims included refugees, three women and one 5-year-old child. Afterwards it was occupied by Germany until 1945. The local Polish police chief was murdered by the Russians in the Katyn massacre in 1940.

== Sights ==
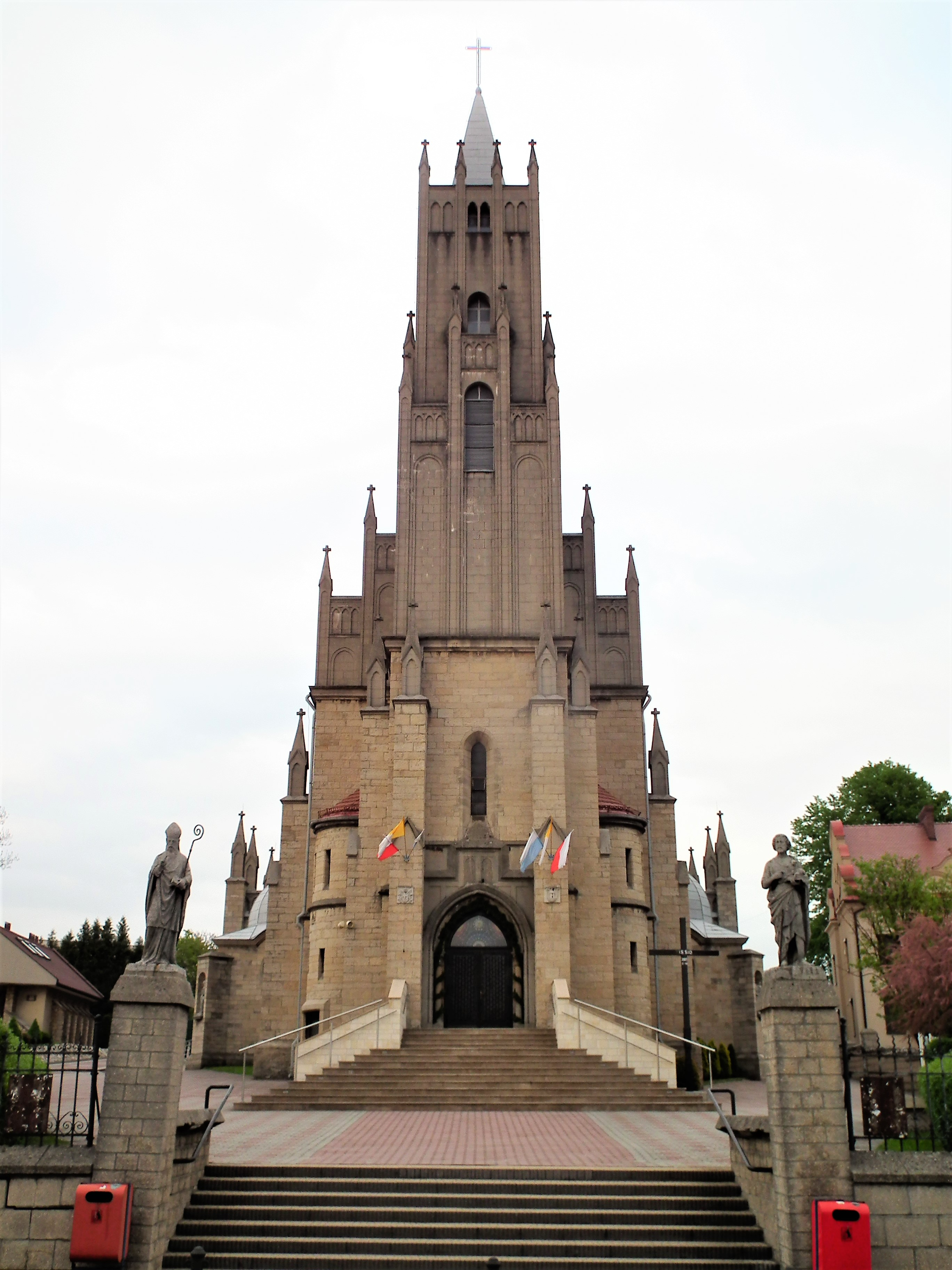
Our Lady of Mount Carmel Church

A noteworthy building is Our Lady of Mount Carmel Church, a Gothic Revival building constructed between 1909 and 1912, and subsequently enlarged in 1953: in 1957 the height of the tower was increased to 27 meters. There is also a small chapel where Napoleon prayed on his way to Russia during his invasion of Russia.

== Notable people from Imielin ==
- Albin Siekierski (1920–1989), author
- Mateusz Górniak (born 1996), writer
