= Piotr Mróz (philosopher) =

Polish philosopher (born 1953)

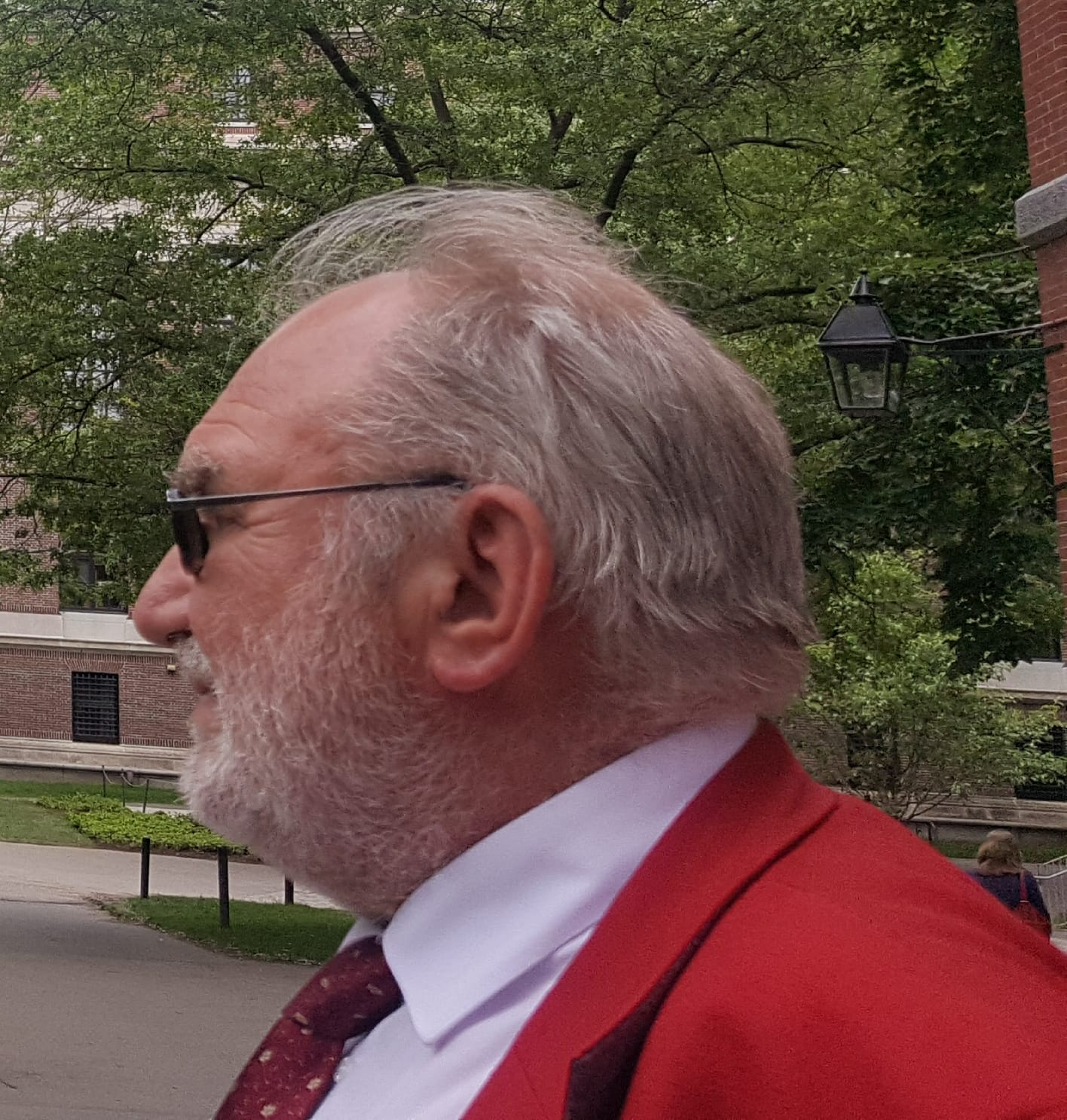
- Piotr Mróz, 2022
- Born: 8 April 1953 (age 73)
- Citizenship: Polish
- Occupations: philosopher, academic teacher

Piotr Mróz (born 8 April 1953) is a Polish philosopher, professor of humanities, head of the Department of Philosophy of Culture at the Institute of Philosophy of the Jagiellonian University, translator, polyglot.

== Biography ==
He was born in Kraków. In 1977, at the Jagiellonian University, he defended his master's thesis in English Philology: Corridors of Power. An aesthetic study of Machiavellian and Erasmian Rulers in Shakespeare, written under the supervision of Przemysław Mroczkowski; published in 1992. He earned his master's degree in philosophy under the supervision of Maria Gołaszewska in 1981, based on his work Surrealism and Philosophy: André Breton's Adventure with the Superreal (published in 1998). He defended his doctorate, also written under the supervision of Maria Gołaszewska, in 1987. His doctoral thesis, The Paths of Unreality, was devoted to the work of Jean-Paul Sartre, particularly his aesthetics.

He specializes in phenomenology, the philosophy of existence, aesthetics, and the philosophy of culture. He devoted his habilitation thesis to the thought of Merleau-Ponty (Art as Project: Maurice Merleau-Ponty's Philosophy and Aesthetics, 2003), and then turned to the aesthetics of Søren Kierkegaard (Soren Kierkegaard and the Impossible Art, 2013). He became the head of the Department of Philosophy of Culture at the Institute of Philosophy of the Jagiellonian University. As an academic, he teaches popular and well-attended courses, which continue to attract successive generations of students. These courses are primarily devoted to existentialism, the main theories of the philosophy of culture, and philosophical themes in fiction. Piotr Mróz has also been a visiting professor at a number of Western European and international universities, including, among others, University of Lagos in Nigeria, where he met Professor Jim Unah, one of Heidegger's students. Since the late 1990s, he has also taught courses in English and Spanish for international students at the Jagiellonian University and other universities in Kraków.

He regularly publishes articles in the Analecta Husserliana series, a journal founded by Anna Teresa Tymieniecka, which features articles on phenomenological research. He has also participated in numerous conferences and seminars organized by Professor Tymieniecka.

He is a polyglot; he speaks six foreign languages. Over the years, he has collaborated closely with Maria Gołaszewska and Władysław Strożewski (students of Roman Ingarden); as well as with Beata Szymańska, Krystyna Wilkoszewska, Janusz Mizera, and Józef Tischner. On various occasions, he met philosophers of culture from across Europe and the world, including Jacques Derrida (whose personal translator he was during his visit to Poland), Joseph Beuys, and Roger Scruton. Together with the theatre director Grzegorz Jarzyna, he traveled through Russia, Mongolia, China, Polynesia, and Australia in the footsteps of Bronisław Malinowski.

He supervised three doctoral dissertations, including: Remigiusz Ryziński (2011), Maciej Kałuża (2013), Paweł Malata (2019). Among his students at the Jagiellonian University was Mateusz Górniak.

In 2024, Księgarnia Akademicka published a Festschrift Wokół filozof Kultury: tom jubileuszowy dedykowany Profesorowi Piotrowi Mrozowi z okazji Jego siedemdziesiątych urodzin (an anniversary volume dedicated to Professor Piotr Mróz on the occasion of his seventieth birthday), edited by Marcin Karas and Jędrzej Skibowski.

== Books ==
- 1990: Sztuka a nierzeczywistość (publisher: PWN)
- 1992: Drogi nierzeczywistości: poglądy estetyczne Jean-Paul Sartre’a 1930–1960 (publisher: Jagiellonian University)
- 1992: Filozofia sztuki (w ujęciu egzystencjalizmu) (publisher: Polska Akademia Nauk. Oddział w Krakowie)
- 1992: Corridors of power: an aesthetic study of the Machiavellian and Erasmian Rulers in Shakespeare (Zakład Estetyki Instytutu Filozofii Uniwersytetu Jagiellońskiego)
- 1997: Four essays in existentialism (Wydawnictwo Aureus)
- 1998: Surrealizm a filozofia: André Bretona przygoda z nadrzeczywistym (Wydawnictwo Aureus)
- 2002: Sztuka jako projekt: filozofia i estetyka Maurice’a Merleau-Ponty’ego (Księgarnia Akademicka, rozprawa habilitacyjna)
- 2013: Søren Kierkegaard i sztuka niemożliwa: poglądy estetyczne Kierkegaardowskich autorów pseudonimowych (Wydawnictwo Libron)
- 2017: From the Absurd to Revolt / De l'absurde a la revolte. Dynamics in Albert Camus’s thought / Dynamique de la pensée d’Albert Camus, edition, together with Maciej Kałuża (Jagiellonian University Press)

== Translations ==
=== Into Polish ===
- Jean-Paul Sartre: Wyobraźnia (1998, together with Anna Śpiewak)
- Jean-Paul Sartre: Byt i nicość (2007, together with Jan Kiełbasa, Rafał Abracimów, Remigiusz Ryziński, Paulina Małochleb)
- Daisetz Teitaro Suzuki: Zen i kultura japońska (2009, together with Beata Szymańska and Anna Zalewska)

=== Into English ===
- Maria Gołaszewska, Aesthetics in Poland (1996)
