= Mateusz Górniak =

Polish writer (born 1996)

- Born: 4 May 1996 (age 30); Imielin
- Citizenship: Polish
- Occupations: writer, playwright, film critic

Mateusz Górniak (born 4 May 1996) is a Polish writer, playwright and film critic.

== Biography ==
After graduating from high school, he left Imielin for Kraków, where he enrolled in the Inter-Faculty Individual Studies in the Humanities at the Jagiellonian University, which he did not complete. At the Jagiellonian University, he attended classes led by, among others, Piotr Mróz. In 2020, he became one of the participants in the "First Book in Prose" project organized by the Biuro Literackie and worked on his writing skills under the supervision of Adam Kaczanowski. In 2022, he moved from Kraków to Warsaw's Białołęka district. He became an artistic resident at the Nowy Teatr in Warsaw.

== Books ==
- Trash Story (collection of short stories, 2022),
- Dwie powieści ruchu (2023),
- Ćpun i głupek (2025),
- Pięć adaptacji (2025).

== Works for theatre ==
- Piramida zwierząt, Stary Theatre in Kraków, directed by Michał Borczuch (premiere: 15 November 2025).
