= Józef Tusk =

Polish luthier, grandfather of Donald Tusk (1907–1987)

- Born: March 23, 1907; Emaus, German Empire
- Died: June 12, 1987 (aged 80); Sopot, Poland
- Citizenship: German (1907–1920); Danziger (1920–1939); German (1939–1945); Polish (1945–1987)
- Occupation: Luthier
- Spouse: Julianna Jeżewska
- Children: 6, including Bronisław, Donald sr.
- Relatives: Donald Tusk (grandson)
- Military career
- Allegiance: Poland (until 1940); Nazi Germany (1944); Poland (1944–1945)
- Branch: Tajna Organizacja Wojskowa (until 1940); Wehrmacht (1944); Polish Armed Forces in the West (1944–1945)
- Service years: 1939–1945
- Units: 328th Grenadier Replacement and Training Battalion
- Conflicts: Invasion of Poland
- Awards: Medal of Victory and Freedom (1946)

Józef Tusk (23 March 1907 – 12 June 1987) was a Polish luthier, the grandfather of the Prime Minister of Poland, Donald Tusk. During World War II, Tusk was arrested by the Germans and conscripted as a forced laborer before he was pressed into the Wehrmacht, the latter of which proved to be controversial during his grandson's 2005 Polish presidential election.

== Biography ==
A member of the Lechitic (West Slavic) Polish–Kashubian minority, Józef Tusk was born in Emaus – a suburb of Danzig, German Empire to a working class Catholic family of Józef Tusk and Augustyna Tusk (née Adamczyk). He became a citizen of the Free City of Danzig after World War I and worked for Polish State Railways in the Free City. He became a member of the Polish Secret Military Organization (Tajna Organizacja Wojskowa, TOW), which prepared behind-the-lines operatives in case of the war. On 1 September 1938 Tusk was placed in the position of the telegraphist in the Danzig (Gdańsk) railway station. It is likely, but not confirmed, that he had been working with the Polish intelligence services. On 1 September 1939, when Germany invaded Poland, the Free City of Danzig was incorporated into the German Reich and the citizens of the Free City became German nationals. Tusk was assaulted in his house in the morning, and later witnessed German arrests of Poles at a railway station, and the Defence of the Polish Post in Danzig.

Józef Tusk reported the assault to Danzig police, and was subsequently arrested as a Polish activist, described as a "Polish fanatic, dangerous to the security of the German State"; his family on the same day was evicted from their house. Tusk was a forced laborer working in the construction of the Stutthof concentration camp In 1941 he was interviewed by Gestapo and imprisoned in Neuengamme concentration camp. On 26 August 1942 he was released from Neuengamme.

On 2 August 1944 Tusk was conscripted into Wehrmacht, into the 328. Grenadier-Ersatz- und Ausbildungsbatallion (328th Grenadier Replacement and Training Battalion). After about four months, around 24 November 1944 or soon afterward, he either deserted, defecting to the Polish Armed Forces in the West, or was imprisoned in an Allied prisoners-of-war camp.

Józef Tusk returned to Sopot, where his family moved to, in the People's Republic of Poland, in mid-October 1945. According to his family and friends, he never spoke much about his wartime history.

== Legacy ==
Tusk's conscription to Wehrmacht proved to be controversial during the 2005 Polish presidential election, when it was called the "Wehrmacht affair" (Polish: Afera wehrmachtowa), and the most heated issue of the campaign. Similar instances of Poles forced to serve in the German army have proved controversial, particularly after the war, but even in modern Poland saying that a family member served in the German Army is looked down upon. Józef's grandson, Donald Tusk, was a presidential candidate from the Civic Platform party, and the claim that his grandfather not only served but even volunteered to serve in the Wehrmacht gained notoriety in the media after it was made public by the politician from an opposing party, Jacek Kurski from Law and Justice (PiS). (Kurski was later said to have admitted, off camera, that this was false news aimed at "uneducated masses"). This was seen as an attempt to damage Tusk's reputation, by an association with Wehrmacht, the army of Nazi Germany, seen quite negatively in Poland. Donald Tusk stated that he had no knowledge of this part of his family's history; sources vary on the extent to which the revelation had any impact on the presidential campaign, which was eventually won by Tusk's opponent, Lech Kaczyński from PiS. Kurski was expelled from PiS for his role in the accusations, and Kaczyński issued an apology in the name of his political party to Tusk.

== See also ==
- Poles in the Wehrmacht
