= 2023 Polish protests =

Anti-government protests in Poland

- Part of Polish constitutional crisis
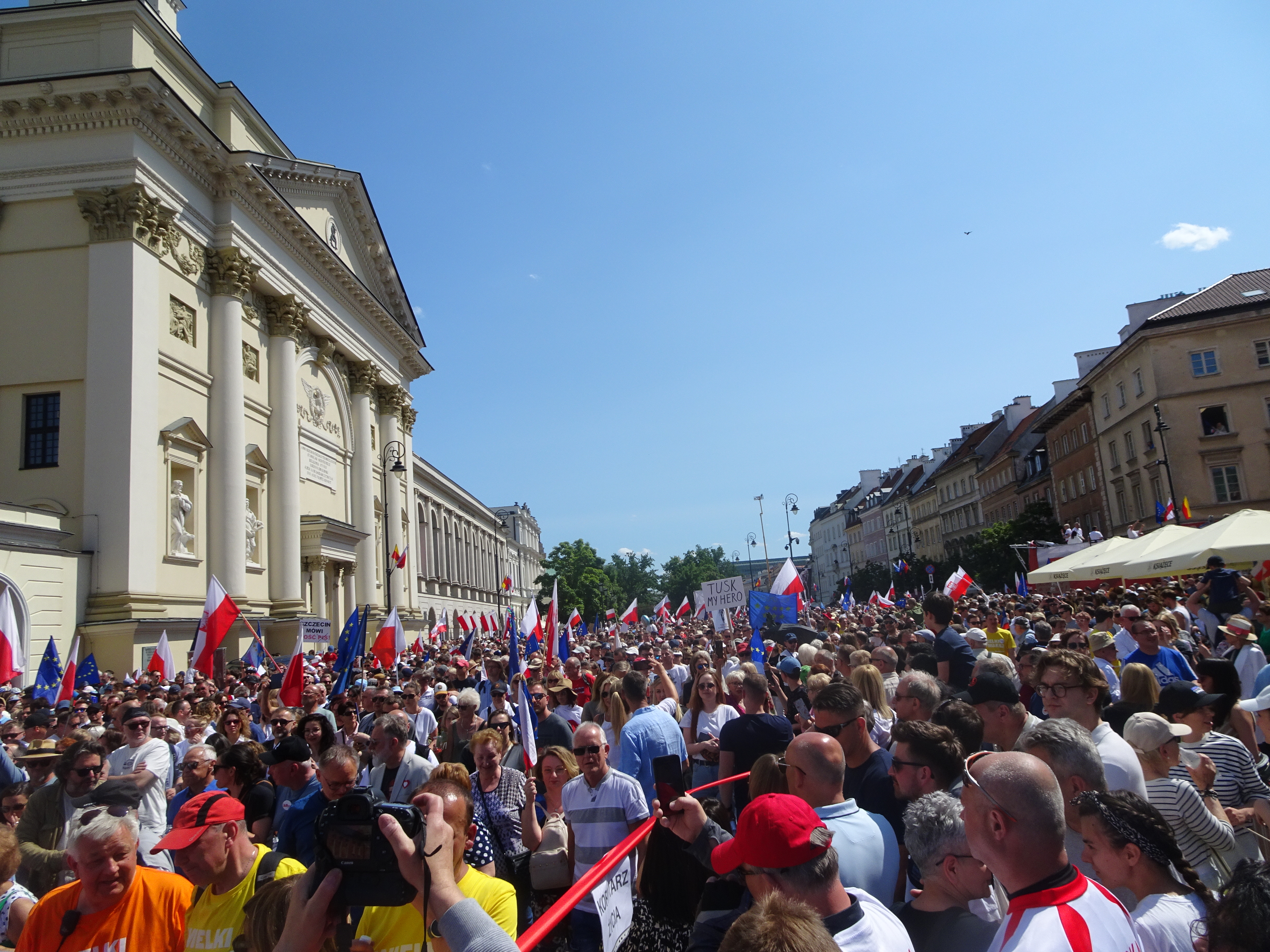
- People marching through the streets of Warsaw as part of the protests held on 4 June 2023.
- Date: June 4 and October 1, 2023
- Location: Warsaw and other areas of Poland
- Caused by: Democratic backsliding: Erosion of civil liberties; Alleged suppression of opposition parties; Drift-away from the European Union; Economic crisis, high inflation; Perceived misuse of funds and poor planning for infrastructure
- Goals: Democratization: Anti-corruption; Free elections; Cancellation of the "Lex Tusk" law; Pro-Europeanism
- Result: Electoral defeat of PiS in the 2023 Polish parliamentary election

Parties
Pro-democracy protestors Civic Platform; KOD; Supported by: League of Polish Families; AGROunia; New Left; TVN Group; Newsweek Polska; Gazeta Wyborcza	Polish government Law and Justice; Counterprotestors; Supported by: Telewizja Polska

Lead figures
Donald Tusk; Rafał Trzaskowski; Lech Wałęsa	Andrzej Duda; Mateusz Morawiecki; Jarosław Kaczyński

Number
June 4: Warsaw: 500,000+ protestors October 1: Warsaw: up to 1,000,000 protestors	

On June 4, 2023, a series of planned anti-government marches took place in several areas of Poland, with the main one being held in the capital city of Warsaw. The protests were additionally motivated by the passing of the bill commonly referred to as "Lex Tusk", which critics argued would disrupt the constitutional separation of powers by giving the ruling party of PiS excessive judicial oversight. The Polish opposition in the national Parliament, as well as numerous foreign commentators, considered the law's approval an extension of the perceived constitutional crisis under the presidency of Andrzej Duda and the government headed by Prime Minister Mateusz Morawiecki.

On 1 October 2023, the "March of a Million Hearts" took place in Warsaw.

== Causes ==
Since at least 2015, the Polish government headed by the right-wing populist Law and Justice party has been accused of facilitating democratic backsliding, specifically within the realm of judicial independence. The party has been accused of curtailing the independence of the judiciary, eliminating the separation of powers, and exercising undue influence over the courts. This culminated in December 2017, when the European Commission triggered Article 7 in relation to the perceived risk to the rule of law in Poland.

The common pattern of all these legislative changes is that the executive or legislative powers are now set up in such a way that the ruling majority can systematically, politically interfere with the composition, the powers, the administration and the functioning of these authorities, thereby rendering the independence of the judiciary completely moot.

— Frans Timmermans, First Vice-President of the European Commission

While the cabinets led by Beata Szydło and Mateusz Morawiecki received popular support among conservatives and the national Catholic Church and steadily increased social benefits, worries have been raised over the government's increasingly aggressive campaigns against minorities (most notably the LGBTQ+ community), reproductive rights, immigration and EU institutions. The perceived erosion of academic freedom in the area of Holocaust research and media liberties, as well as the rising inflation, were also widely seen as reasons of concern.

=== Lex Tusk ===
On 29 May 2023, President of Poland Andrzej Duda announced that he would sign a bill which would establish an investigative panel into whether the liberal party Civic Platform, which was leading the opposition in the national Parliament at the time, had allowed the country to be influenced by Russia under the cabinets of Donald Tusk and Ewa Kopacz from 2007 to 2015, thus making Poland dependent on Russian oil and natural gas. The bill, which was published on the Journal of Laws the following day, would allow the Parliament to create a 10-member commission, whose head would be directly selected by Prime Minister Morawiecki, that would deliver an initial report on 17 September 2023, ahead of the parliamentary election that was set to be held later in the year; the panel would also be allowed to ban any political figures found to have subjected Poland to Russian influence from holding most official public duties for ten years.

Both Duda and the Law and Justice party, which supported the bill's passage, were accused by critics and opposition parties of designing the legislation with the specific goal of targeting opponents and removing them from public life, as well as harming support for Civic Platform's leader, former Prime Minister Tusk: for this reason, the law was nicknamed the "Lex Tusk", or the "Tusk Law". Some critics compared the law's goals to the political rhetoric that was originally spread by US Senator Joseph McCarthy during the late 1940s and the 1950s. The "Lex Tusk" also drew criticism from the European Union, through official statements by Věra Jourová and Didier Reynders, and the United States, with US State Department spokesman Matthew Miller filing an official announcement.

On 2 June 2023, Duda announced that he sent an urgent amendment containing several proposed revisions of the bill to the Polish Parliament, encouraging lawmakers to "act swiftly" and stating that he was reacting to the public outrage surrounding the law's initial passage. According to the Polish president, the proposed amendments would ensure that the law was subject to non-partisan review, that no parliamentary members would be allowed to be part of the commission, and that none of the politicians who would face charges as a result of the investigation could be banned from public office.

== Protests ==
=== June 4 protests ===
On 4 June 2023, former Prime Minister Donald Tusk, together with several other members of the Civic Platform party, organized a series of anti-government protests in Warsaw, Poland's capital city: people from all around the country joined the demonstration, while crowds also gathered in Kraków, Szczecin, Poznań and other Polish cities.

The protests in Warsaw were notably attended by former President and Solidarity leader Lech Wałęsa, incumbent mayor of Warsaw Rafał Trzaskowski, social activist Sylwia Gregorczyk-Abram and New Left leader Włodzimierz Czarzasty, among others. Despite having maintained a more cautious approach in the weeks preceding the event, many other opposition groupings, with the exception of far-right party Confederation, eventually sent their respective representatives to Warsaw, in response to the approval of the "Lex Tusk".

Although there was no official confirmation of the size of the rally, the estimated number of participants in the protests in Warsaw ranged from 300,000 people, according to Polish web portal Onet, to 500,000 people, according to estimates by the city hall and Tusk himself.

The protest coincided with the 34th anniversary of Poland’s partially free elections held in 1989, which is seen as the catalyst for the fall of the Communist regime and a peaceful transition to parliamentarian democracy in Poland. Demonstrators carried Polish and European Union flags and expressed opposition to the governing Law and Justice (PiS) party, with critics accusing the government of undermining democratic institutions.

=== March of a Million Hearts ===
On 1 October 2023, a second wave of protests took place throughout the country, and primarily in the city of Warsaw, which was visited and led by former Prime Minister Donald Tusk. The organizers put the attendance at at least a few hundred thousand, the Warsaw city hall at 1 million, and the police at over 100,000.

== Reactions ==
The June 4 march was called a Polish version of the Euromaidan by one Ukraine-affiliated journalist.
