= Donald Tusk =

Prime Minister of Poland (2007–2014; since 2023)

His Excellency Donald Tusk
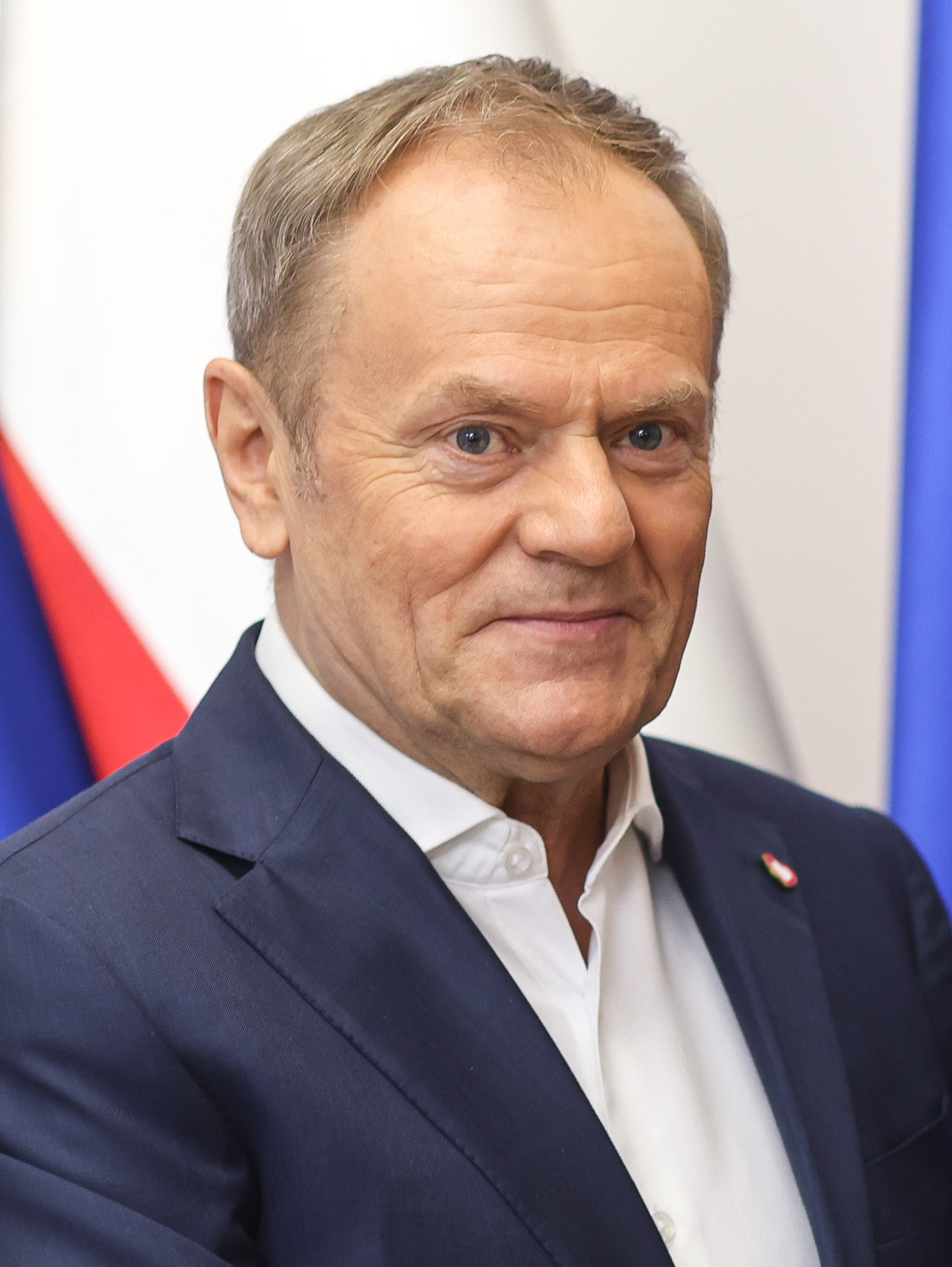
- Tusk in 2025

Prime Minister of Poland
- Incumbent
- Assumed office 13 December 2023
- President: Andrzej Duda; Karol Nawrocki
- Deputy: Władysław Kosiniak-Kamysz; Krzysztof Gawkowski; Radosław Sikorski; Andrzej Domański
- Preceded by: Mateusz Morawiecki
- In office 16 November 2007 – 22 September 2014
- President: Lech Kaczyński Acting (2010): Bronisław Komorowski; Bogdan Borusewicz; Grzegorz Schetyna; Bronisław Komorowski
- Deputy: See list: Waldemar Pawlak; Grzegorz Schetyna; Janusz Piechociński; Jacek Rostowski; Elżbieta Bieńkowska
- Preceded by: Jarosław Kaczyński
- Succeeded by: Ewa Kopacz

President of the European Council
- In office 1 December 2014 – 30 November 2019
- Preceded by: Herman Van Rompuy
- Succeeded by: Charles Michel

Leader of the Civic Coalition
- Incumbent
- Assumed office 25 October 2025
- Preceded by: Position established
Party political offices
Leader of the Civic Platform
In office 3 July 2021 – 25 October 2025
Preceded by	Borys Budka
Succeeded by	Position abolished
In office 1 June 2003 – 8 November 2014
Preceded by	Maciej Płażyński
Succeeded by	Ewa Kopacz
President of the European People's Party
In office 1 December 2019 – 1 June 2022
Preceded by	Joseph Daul
Succeeded by	Manfred Weber
Parliamentary offices
Deputy Marshal of the Sejm
In office 18 October 2001 – 18 October 2005 Serving with others
Marshal	Marek Borowski; Józef Oleksy; Włodzimierz Cimoszewicz
Preceded by	Jan Król
Succeeded by	Bronisław Komorowski
Deputy Marshal of the Senate
In office 20 October 1997 – 18 October 2001 Serving with others
Marshal	Alicja Grześkowiak
Preceded by	Zofia Kuratowska
Succeeded by	Kazimierz Kutz
Member of the Senate
In office 20 October 1997 – 18 October 2001
Constituency	Pomerania
Member of the Sejm
Incumbent
Assumed office 13 November 2023
Constituency	Warsaw I
In office 18 October 2001 – 23 September 2014
Constituency	Warsaw I (2007–2014); Gdańsk (2005–2007); Gdynia (2001–2005)
In office 25 November 1991 – 31 May 1993
Constituency	Gdańsk

Personal details
- Born: Donald Franciszek Tusk; 22 April 1957 (age 69) Gdańsk, Poland
- Party: Civic Coalition (since 2025)
- Other political affiliations: Poland: KLD (1990–1994); UW (1994–2001); PO (2001–2025); Civic Coalition (since 2018); European Union: EPP (2014–2022)
- Spouse: Małgorzata Sochacka (m. 1978)
- Children: 2
- Relatives: Józef Tusk (grandfather)
- Education: University of Gdańsk
- Awards: See list: Order of the Sun of Peru; Royal Norwegian Order of Merit; Charlemagne Prize; Order of the Cross of Terra Mariana; National Order of Merit (Malta); Order of Prince Yaroslav the Wise; Order of the Star of Romania; Order of the Rising Sun; Presidential Order of Excellence

Donald Franciszek Tusk (Note: /tuːsk/ TOOSK; Polish: [ˈdɔnalt fraɲˈt͡ɕiʂɛk ˈtusk]; Kashubian: Donôld Frãcëszk Tusk) (born 22 April 1957) is a Polish politician and historian who has served as the prime minister of Poland since 2023, previously holding the office from 2007 to 2014. Tusk was President of the European Council from 2014 to 2019 and led the European People's Party from 2019 to 2022. He co-founded the Civic Platform (PO), one of the dominant Polish political parties, and was its longtime leader – from 2003 to 2014 and again from 2021 to 2025 – before it merged into the Civic Coalition (KO) party. He is the longest-serving prime minister of the Third Polish Republic.

Tusk has been officially involved in politics since 1989, having co-founded multiple political parties, such as the free market–oriented Liberal Democratic Congress party (KLD). He first entered the Sejm in 1991 but lost his seat in 1993. In 1994, the KLD merged with the Democratic Union to form the Freedom Union. In 1997, Tusk was elected to the Senate and became its deputy marshal. In 2001, he co-founded another centre-right liberal conservative party, the PO, and was again elected to the Sejm, becoming its deputy marshal. Tusk stood unsuccessfully for President of Poland in the 2005 election and would also suffer defeat in the 2005 Polish parliamentary election.

Leading the PO to victory at the 2007 parliamentary election, he was appointed prime minister, and scored a second victory in the 2011 election, becoming the first Polish prime minister to be re-elected since the fall of communism in 1989. In 2014, he left Polish politics to accept appointment as president of the European Council. The Civic Platform would lose control of both the presidency and parliament to the rival Law and Justice (PiS) party in the 2015 Polish presidential election and 2015 Polish parliamentary election. Tusk was President of the European Council until 2019; although initially remaining in Brussels as leader of the EPP, he later returned to Polish politics in 2021, becoming leader of the Civic Platform again. In the 2023 election, his Civic Coalition won 157 seats in the Sejm to become the second-largest bloc in the chamber. Following the president-appointed prime minister Mateusz Morawiecki's failure to secure a vote of confidence on 11 December, Tusk was elected by the Sejm to become prime minister for a third time. His cabinet was sworn in on 13 December, ending eight years of government by the PiS party.

Having been the longest-serving prime minister of the Third Republic, Tusk oversaw in his first term the reduction and digitization of the public sector, wishing to present himself as a pragmatic liberal realist and technocrat. In the lead-up to the co-organization by Poland of Euro 2012, he invested strongly in infrastructure, expanding the highway network at the cost of the rail sector. In his second term, various scandals, unfulfilled promises and a cooling of the economy in 2012–2014 as his European debt crisis-related austerity policies led to a drop in public support. In the landscape dominated by the PiS after its electoral victories, Tusk stood as an influential holdout opposing what he considered democratic backsliding. Returning to power in 2023, he has focused on reforming the judiciary and warming relations between Poland and the EU. Since then, as PM, Tusk has continued aid to Ukraine after the Russian invasion. In 2024, he surprised the public with his appropriation of right-wing themes, such as opposition to illegal migration, prioritizing border security, going as far as to temporarily suspend the right of asylum for those who illegally cross the Belarus–Poland border.

== Early life ==
Tusk was born and raised in Gdańsk in Northern Poland. He has Polish, German (through his maternal grandmother) and Kashubian origins, self-identifying as Polish, Kashubian and European. His father, Donald Tusk Sr. (1929–1972), was a carpenter whilst his mother, Ewa Tusk née Dawidowska (1934–2009), was a nurse. His maternal grandmother's native language was Danzig German.

His paternal grandfather, Józef Tusk (1907–1987), a luthier and railway official, was imprisoned in the Neuengamme concentration camp from 1941 to 1942. As a former citizen of the Free City of Danzig, he was subsequently forcibly conscripted into the Wehrmacht by the Nazi authorities. Stationed on the Western front in Aachen, he defected after four months and joined the Polish Armed Forces in the West, fighting alongside the Western Allies.

Tusk has described the city of his youth as "a typical frontier town" with "many borders between ethnicities". His Kashubian ancestry along with a multilingual family background shaped his early awareness that "nothing is simple in life or in history", leading him to develop a political perspective that "it is best to be immune to every kind of orthodoxy, of ideology, and most importantly, nationalism".

He recalled his youth under communism as having been "so hopeless" due to its monotony, with "no hope for anything to change". He considers his young self a "typical hooligan", often getting into fights – "we would roam the streets, you know, cruising for a bruising". Tusk credits his interest in politics to witnessing clashes between striking workers and riot police as a teenager.

He studied history at the University of Gdańsk, graduating in 1980. During his time at university he was active in the Student Committee of Solidarity, opposing Poland's communist regime of the time.

== Early political career ==
Tusk was one of the founders of the Liberal Democratic Congress (Kongres Liberalno-Demokratyczny KLD), which in the 1991 elections won 37 seats in the lower house of parliament. The KLD later merged with the Democratic Union (UD) to become the Freedom Union (UW). Tusk became deputy chairman of the new party, and was elected to the Senate in the next election in 1997. In 2001, he co-founded Civic Platform, and became deputy speaker in parliament after the party won seats in the year's election. He also became deputy marshal of the Sejm.

== 2005 Polish presidential election ==
In the shade of the upcoming expiration of President Aleksander Kwaśniewski's second term and his inability to stand for a third term, Tusk and Lech Kaczyński were the leading candidates for the presidential elections. Although both leading candidates came from the center-right, and their two parties had planned to form a coalition government following the parliamentary elections on 25 September, there were important differences between Tusk and Kaczyński. Tusk wanted to enforce a separation of church and state, favoured rapid European integration and supported a free-market economy. Kaczyński was very socially conservative, a soft Eurosceptic, and supported state intervention. Such differences led to the failure of POPiS coalition talks in late October. Jacek Protasiewicz headed his electoral campaign staff. Tusk's campaign motto was, "President Tusk – A man with principles; We will be proud of Poland." In the election, Tusk received 36.6% of votes in the first round and then faced Kaczyński, who got 33.1% of votes in the first round.

In the second round, Tusk was defeated by Kaczyński.

One controversy during the election was the accusation that Tusk's grandfather, Józef Tusk, had been a Nazi collaborator during WWII, having served in the German Wehrmacht during the war. The controversy, according to the BBC, "is believed to have influenced some voters negatively".

== First premiership (2007–2014) ==
Tusk and his Civic Platform party emerged victorious in the 2007 Polish parliamentary election, defeating incumbent prime minister Jarosław Kaczyński's Law and Justice party with about 42% of the vote to Law and Justice's 32%. Tusk and his assembled cabinet were sworn in on 16 November, as he became the fourteenth prime minister of the Third Polish Republic.

In the 2011 Polish parliamentary election, Civic Platform retained their Parliamentary majority, giving Tusk a second term as prime minister and making him Poland's first PM to win reelection since the fall of communism. In September 2014, leaders of the European Union voted unanimously by selecting Tusk as Herman van Rompuy's successor for President of the European Council, which gave Poland its first European leadership position since the fall of the Berlin Wall. Tusk resigned as prime minister and was succeeded by Marshal of the Sejm Ewa Kopacz.

=== Domestic policy ===
During the 2007 parliamentary election campaign and initially, when he entered office, Tusk promised to continue the free market policies, streamline the bureaucracy, enact long-term stable governance, cut taxes to attract greater foreign business ventures, encourage Polish citizens living overseas to return to Poland, and privatize state-owned companies. While in office, Tusk changed his views on the role of taxation in the functioning of the state and his government never cut any taxes. Instead, it raised VAT from 22% to 23% in 2011, increased the tax imposed on diesel oil, alcohol, tobacco and coal, and eliminated many tax exemptions. The number of people employed in public administration also grew considerably. By 2012, the value of foreign investments in Poland had not matched the peak level attained in 2006–07, before Tusk entered office. The number of Poles living abroad in 2013 was almost the same level as in 2007.

During his government, Tusk oversaw the austerity programme.

The construction of a more adequate and larger national road network in preparation for the UEFA 2012 football championships was a stated priority for Tusk's government. On 27 October 2009, Tusk declared that he wanted to ban gambling partially. During the 2009 swine flu pandemic, Tusk defended his government's decision not to purchase swine flu vaccine, citing the lack of testing by pharmaceutical companies and its unavailability to be purchased freely through the market. Tusk criticized other nations' responses to the pandemic. "The eagerness of some countries seems to be excessive and disproportionate to the real epidemiological situation," Tusk stated, referring to the pandemic's relatively low fatality rate.

Tusk was moderately conservative on social issues for a long time. He was opposed to legalizing abortion on demand, believing that current Polish legislation on abortion at that time (which allowed for legal abortion only when the pregnancy threatens the woman's life or health, when the fetus is seriously malformed, and when the pregnancy results from rape or incest) protected human life best. Tusk had publicly stated that he opposed euthanasia.

In June 2022, Tusk changed his stance on abortion, supporting a bill that would legalize abortion up to 12 weeks.

=== Foreign policy ===
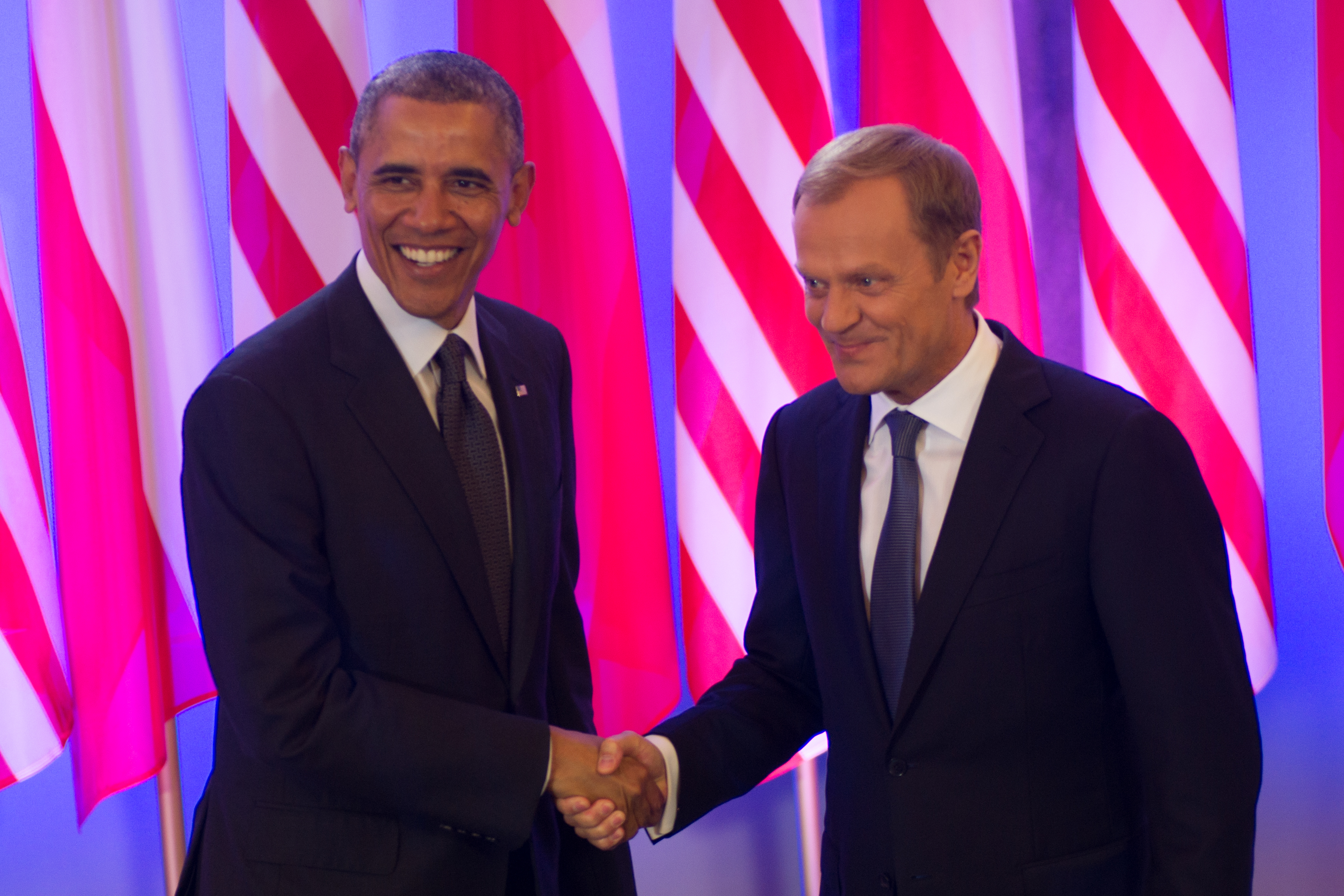
Prime Minister Tusk with Barack Obama, June 2014

In foreign policy, Tusk sought to improve relations severely damaged during the previous Kaczyński government, particularly with Germany and Russia. While he criticized the words of German politician Erika Steinbach with regard to her opinion over the expulsion of Germans from Poland following World War II, Tusk has stressed the need for warm relations with Germany. Tusk also advocated a more realistic relationship with Moscow, especially in regard to energy policy. Under Tusk's premiership, Russian bans on Polish meat and agricultural products were lifted, while Poland reversed its official policy of disagreement on a European Union-Russian partnership agreement. On 26 February 2008 under his government Poland was one of the first countries to recognize independence of Kosovo, becoming the first Slavic nation to do so.

During a speech delivered to the Sejm in the first weeks of his premiership, Tusk outlined a proposal to withdraw military units from Iraq, stating that "we will conduct this operation keeping in mind that our commitment to our ally, the United States, has been lived up to and exceeded". The last Polish military units completed their withdrawal in October 2008.

In regard to U.S. plans of hosting missile defense shield bases in the country, Tusk hinted skepticism toward the project, saying that their presence could potentially increase security risks from Russia, and rejected U.S. offers in early July 2008. By August, however, Tusk relented, and supported the missile shield, declaring: "We have achieved the main goal. It means our countries, Poland and the United States will be more secure." Following President Barack Obama's decision to scrap and revise missile defense strategy, Tusk described the move as "a chance to strengthen Polish-US co-operation in defense..." He said: "I took this declaration from President Obama very seriously and with great satisfaction."

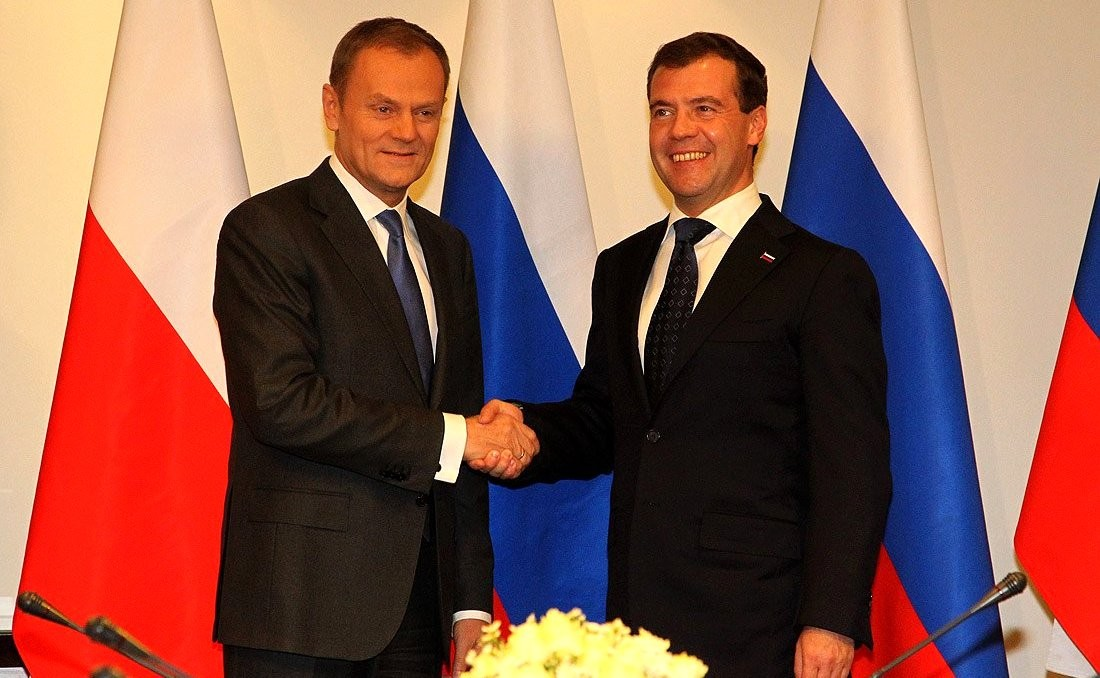
Tusk with Russian President Dmitry Medvedev in Warsaw, 6 December 2010

Tusk announced that Polish soldiers would not take military action in Libya, although he voiced support for the 2011 military intervention in Libya and pledged to offer logistical support.

Contrary to the condemnation of foreign governments and the leadership of the European Union, Tusk supported Hungarian prime minister Viktor Orbán in his efforts of implementing a new controversial constitution. Tusk stated that the Hungarian constitution's democratic controversies were "exaggerated" and that Hungary had "a European level standard of democracy". Tusk's support for the Hungarian government garnered a rare show of solidarity with the opposition Law and Justice, which also publicly displayed support for Orbán's efforts.

In early 2012, Tusk announced his support for committing Poland to signing the international Anti-Counterfeiting Trade Agreement (ACTA). In response, websites for the Chancellery, Sejm and Presidency were hacked in mid-January. Following Anonymous's claim of responsibility for the web attack, Tusk remained undeterred by internet protests, authorising the Polish ambassador in Japan to sign the agreement, yet promised that final legislation in the Sejm would not go ahead without assurances regarding freedom to access the Internet. Despite the government's guarantees, mass protests erupted in late January, with demonstrations held in Warsaw, Kraków, Wrocław and Kielce. Further web attacks were reported on the website of Foreign Minister Radek Sikorski.

==== European policy ====
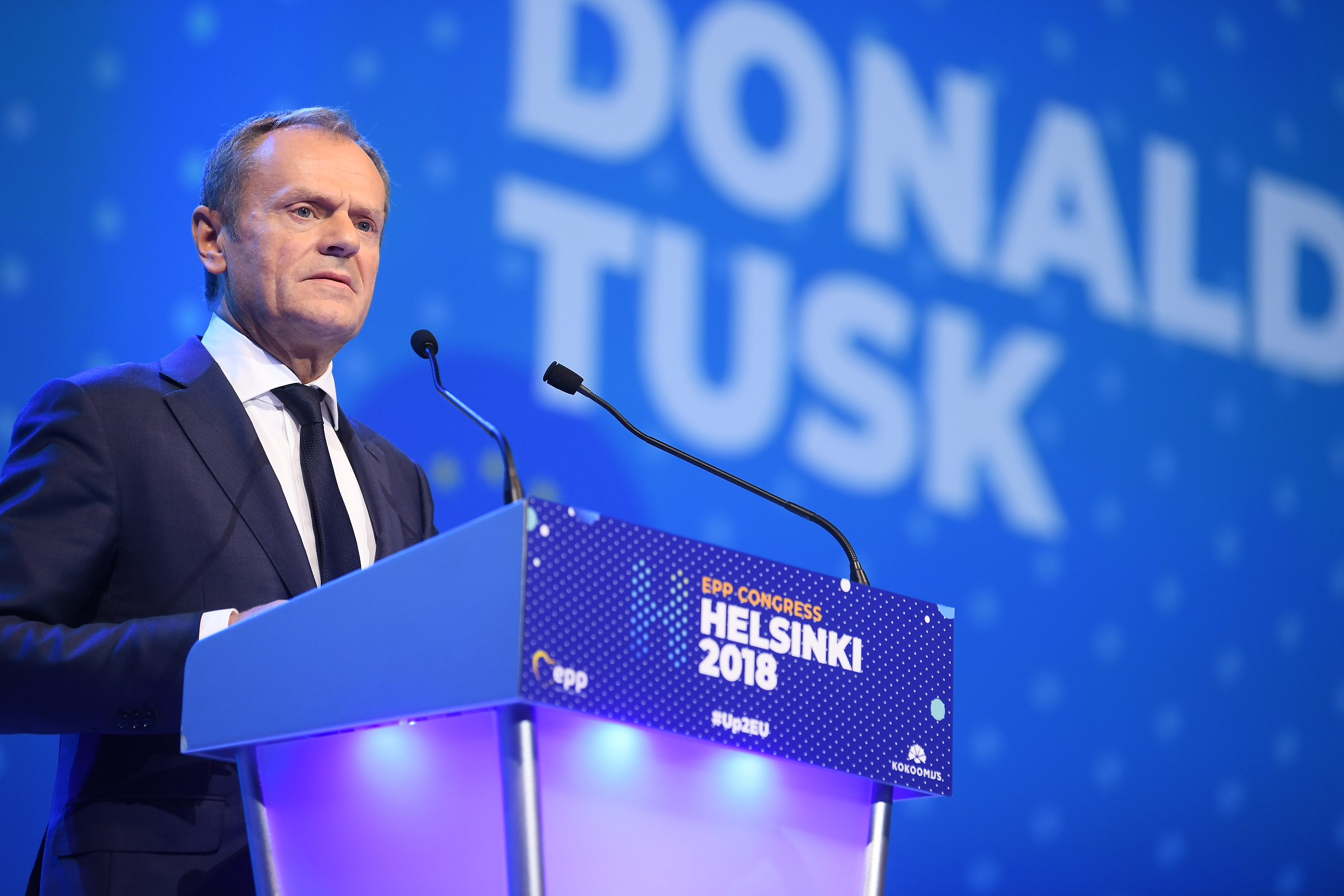
Tusk at the European People's Party Congress in Helsinki, Finland, on 8 November 2018

In continental policy, Tusk strongly supported greater political and economic integration within the European Union, strongly backing the implementation of the Lisbon Treaty, standing in stark contrast to President Lech Kaczyński's vehement opposition. Tusk repeatedly stated his government's intention in bringing Poland into the Eurozone. Originally wanting to introduce the euro by 2012, Tusk envisaged in 2009 a starting year of 2015 as "a realistic and not overly-ambitious goal". However, during the European sovereign debt crisis, Tusk and his government displayed less optimism in joining the monetary union under contemporary economic circumstances, leading to Finance Minister Jan Vincent-Rostowski calling any move "unthinkable". Despite not being a member of the eurozone, Tusk pressed that Poland, along with the other non-eurozone states of the EU, should be included in future euro financial negotiations.

Between July and December 2011, Poland under Tusk's government presided over the Presidency of the Council of the European Union. Under its presidency tenure, Poland supported and welcomed Croatia's entry into the European Union through the Treaty of Accession 2011.

While being a constituent member of the Weimar Triangle with fellow states Germany and France, Tusk showed displeasure over German Chancellor Angela Merkel's and French president Nicolas Sarkozy's dominating roles in eurozone negotiations, remarking to Italian newspaper Corriere della Sera in January 2012 that "this should not translate into a lasting political monopoly: things cannot be left to only two capitals of Europe".

=== Constitutional reform ===
After being elected prime minister, relations between Tusk and President Lech Kaczyński were often acrimonious due to different political ideologies and the constitutional role of the presidency. Using presidential veto powers, Kaczyński blocked legislation drafted by the Tusk government, including pension reform, agricultural and urban zoning plans, and restructuring state television.

In his premiership, Tusk has proposed various reforms to the Polish constitution. In 2009, Tusk proposed changes to the power of the presidency, by abolishing the presidential veto. "The president should not have veto power. People make their decision in elections and then state institutions should not be in conflict," said Tusk. Tusk again reiterated his desire for constitutional reform in February 2010, proposing that the presidential veto be overridden by a simple parliamentary majority rather than through a three-fifths vote. "Presidential veto could not effectively block the will of the majority in parliament, which won elections and formed the government," stated Tusk. Further constitutional reforms proposed by Tusk include reducing the Sejm from a membership of 460 to 300, "not only because of its savings, but also the excessive number of members' causes blurring certain plans and projects" Similarly, Tusk proposed radical changes to the Senate, preferring to abolish the upper house altogether, yet due to constitutional concerns and demands from the junior coalition Polish People's Party partner, Tusk proposed reducing the Senate from 100 to 49, while including former presidents to sit in the Senate for political experience and expertise in state matters. Parliamentary immunity for all members of the Sejm and Senate would also be stripped, except for in special situations. In addition, Tusk proposed that the prime minister's role in foreign policy decisions would be greatly expanded. By decreasing the president's role in governance, executive power would further be concentrated in the prime minister, directly responsible to the cabinet and Sejm, as well as avoiding confusion over Poland's representation at international or EU summits. The opposition conservative Law and Justice party deeply criticized Tusk's constitutional reform proposals, opting in opposing legislation for the presidency to garner greater power over the prime minister.

In an interview with the Financial Times in January 2010, Tusk was asked if he considered running again as Civic Platform's candidate for that year's presidential election. Tusk replied that although the presidential election typically drew the most voters to the polls and remained Poland's most high-profiled race, the presidency had little political power outside of the veto, and preferred to remain as prime minister. While not formally excluding his candidacy, Tusk declared, "I would very much like to continue to work in the government and Civic Platform, because that seems to me to be the key element in ensuring success in the civilizational race in which we are engaged." A day after the interview, Tusk formally announced his intention of staying as prime minister, allowing his party to choose another candidate (and eventual winner), Bronisław Komorowski.

== President of the European Council (2014–2019) ==
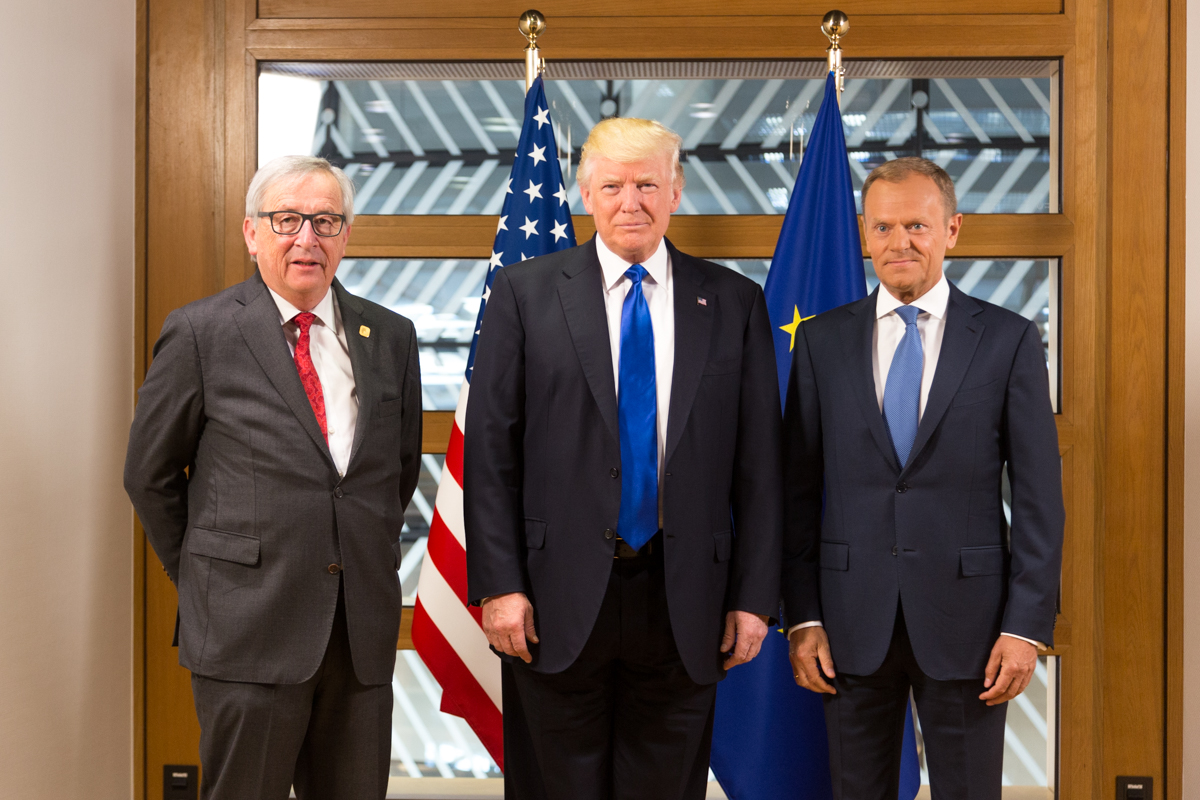
Tusk meeting with European Commission President Jean-Claude Juncker and US President Donald Trump, May 2017

Tusk succeeded Herman Van Rompuy as President of the European Council on 1 December 2014. After assuming office, Tusk worked to promote a unified European response to Russia's military intervention in Ukraine. Tusk made attempts to co-ordinate the EU's response to the European migrant crisis, and warned illegal economic migrants not to come to Europe. Ahead of the UK's EU membership referendum Tusk warned of dire consequences should the UK vote to leave. After the UK voted to leave, he pursued a hard line on the UK's withdrawal from the European Union stating that the country's only real alternative to a "hard Brexit" is "no Brexit". In September 2018, he caused controversy after his official Instagram account posted an image of himself handing a slice of cake to British prime minister Theresa May, with the caption: "A piece of cake, perhaps? Sorry, no cherries." In 2018, Tusk opposed the Nord Stream 2 gas pipeline from Russia to Germany.

On 31 January 2017, Tusk wrote an open letter to 27 EU heads of state or government on the future of the EU before the Malta summit. In this letter, he stated the Trump administration presented a threat to the EU on a par with a newly assertive China, an aggressive Russia and "wars, terror and anarchy in the Middle East and Africa".

On 9 March 2017, Tusk was re-elected for a second term to run until 30 November 2019. He received 27 of 28 votes; the one vote against him came from Beata Szydło, the prime minister of Poland. Tusk's actions in the wake of the 2010 plane crash that killed then-Polish president Lech Kaczyński provoked opposition from Poland's governing right-wing party—critics said that Tusk's centrist government did not sufficiently investigate the cause of the crash. Szydło refused to sign the EU statement issued at the end of the council's meeting in protest at Tusk's reelection, though other EU leaders spoke in favor of him; Prime Minister Mark Rutte of the Netherlands called him "a very good president", and European Commission President Jean-Claude Juncker and German chancellor Angela Merkel both made statements supporting the vote. Donald Tusk maintains there will be no winners from Brexit and the two years following the triggering of Article 50 will be a time of damage limitation.

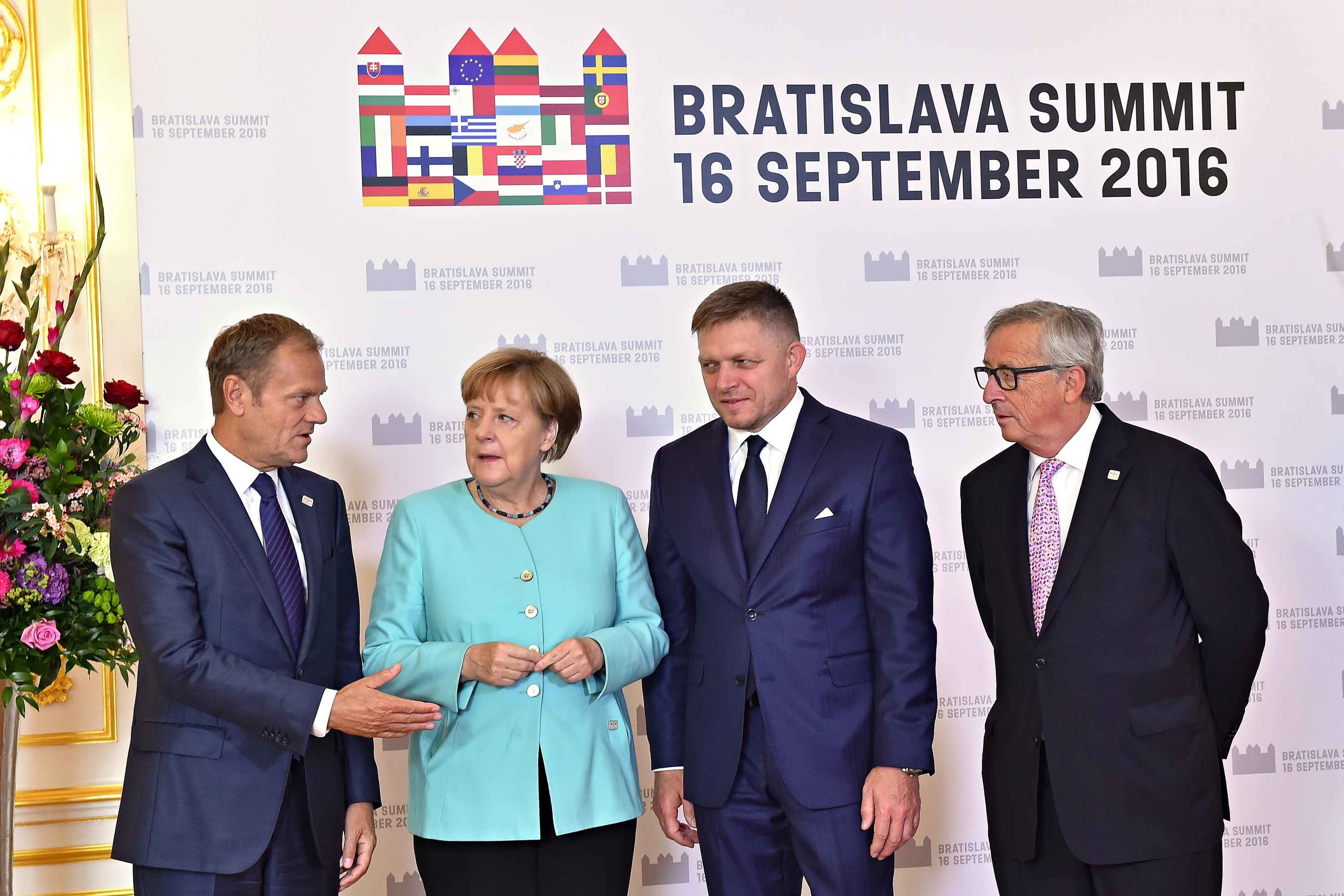
Tusk and Juncker with Angela Merkel and Robert Fico within Bratislava Summit 2016

In February 2018, Tusk urged Turkey "to avoid threats or actions against any EU member and instead commit to good neighbourly relations, peaceful dispute settlement and respect for territorial sovereignty". Tusk also expressed concern over the Turkish invasion of northern Syria in 2018. In response to the death of Chinese Nobel Peace Prize laureate Liu Xiaobo, who died of organ failure while in government custody, Tusk and Jean-Claude Juncker said in a joint statement that they had learned of Liu's death "with deep sadness".

On 6 February 2019, Tusk held talks with Irish Premier Leo Varadkar in Brussels to discuss Britain's departure from the European Union, stating that there was a "special place in Hell for those who promoted Brexit without even a sketch of a plan how to carry it out safely". Tusk opened his statement by saying there were 50 days to go until the UK's exit from the EU: "I know that still a very great number of people in the UK, and on the continent, as well as in Ireland, wish for a reversal of this decision. I have always been with you, with all my heart. But the facts are unmistakable. At the moment, the pro-Brexit stance of the UK Prime Minister, and the Leader of the Opposition, rules out this question. Today, there is no political force and no effective leadership for Remain. I say this without satisfaction, but you can't argue with the facts."

On 24 August 2019 in Biarritz for the G7 Summit, Tusk addressed reporters regarding Brexit, stating "one thing I will not cooperate on is no deal". He also said he hoped that Boris Johnson would not go down in history as "Mr No Deal". In September 2019, Tusk said that the EU should open accession talks with both Albania and North Macedonia.

Tusk condemned the 2019 Turkish offensive into north-eastern Syria. He reprimanded Turkish president Recep Tayyip Erdoğan for threatening to send millions of Syrian refugees to Europe and denounced the Turkish operation in northern Syria as destabilizing the region, which he demanded to halt.

Writing of his tenure as President of the European Council, LSE political scientist Sara Hagemann said "he set the tone for a liberal and progressive agenda at a time of significant threat from populist and pro-Russian voices in Europe".

== Second premiership (2023–present) ==
=== Return to Polish politics and anti-government protests ===
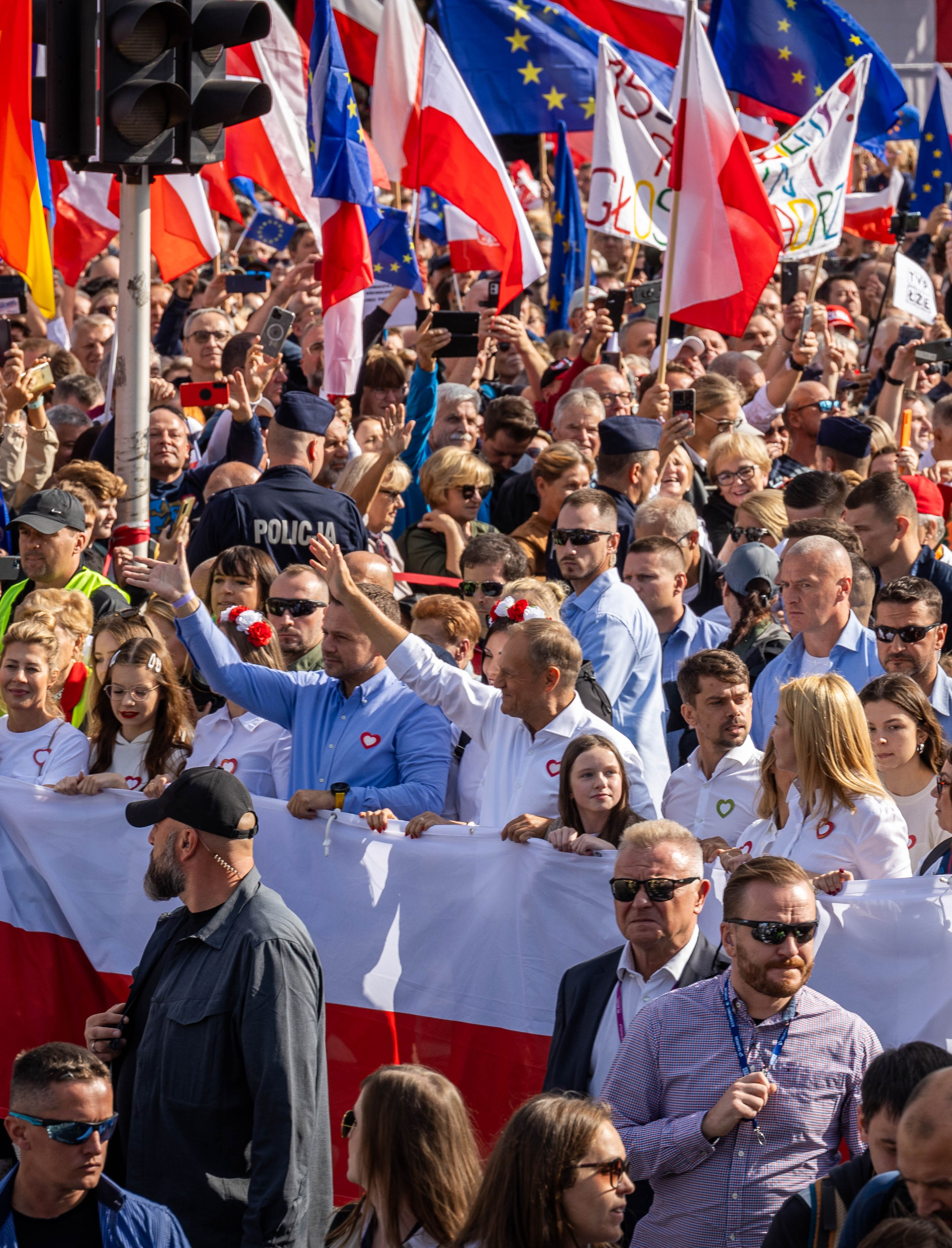
Donald Tusk at the March of a Million Hearts, 1 October 2023

In July 2021, Donald Tusk returned to Warsaw, actively reengaging in Polish politics as leader of Civic Platform. In a May 2022 poll, Tusk was among the leading figures considered by the opposition for the potential future prime minister role, however his overall net approval among the general population was reported as 24.4% in the same period.

In 2023, Tusk organized and led significant anti-government protests in Warsaw. The first demonstration, aimed at opposing democratic backsliding in Poland, occurred on 4 June, marking the 34th anniversary of Poland's semi-free elections in 1989. Turnout was estimated at 300,000–500,000, making the event one of Poland's largest demonstrations since the fall of communism in 1989. A subsequent protest, dubbed the “March of a Million Hearts” took place on 1 October, likewise attracting hundreds of thousands in an effort to galvanize opposition support ahead of the parliamentary elections scheduled for 15 October.

During his campaign, Tusk advocated for enhanced LGBT rights, including introducing same-sex civil unions.

=== 2023 Polish parliamentary election ===
In the 2023 Polish parliamentary election, Tusk's Civic Coalition finished as the second-largest bloc in the Sejm. Between them, Civic Coalition and two other opposition parties, Third Way and New Left, took 54% of the vote, winning enough seats to allow them to take power. On 10 November, Civic Coalition, New Left, the Polish People's Party and Poland 2050 formally signed an agreement to support Tusk as their candidate for prime minister. President Andrzej Duda nominated PiS incumbent Mateusz Morawiecki for another term as prime minister. However, Morawiecki fell short of the support needed to stay in office, as PiS and its allies were 40 seats short of a majority. With this in mind, Tusk publicly announced the agreement before the new Sejm convened to show he and the opposition stood ready to govern. Morawiecki's cabinet was sworn in on 27 November, but was widely expected to lose a confidence vote. Under the constitution, if Morawiecki did not win a confidence vote within two weeks of being sworn in, the Sejm had the right to designate its own nominee for prime minister, and Duda was required to appoint the person so designated. On paper, the four parties who signed the agreement had the votes to designate Tusk as the Sejm's candidate. Morawiecki's cabinet lost a vote of confidence in the Sejm on 11 December by 190 votes to 266. The Sejm subsequently nominated Tusk as its candidate for prime minister, by 248 votes in favor and 201 against. Tusk's cabinet was sworn in on 13 December.

=== Domestic policy ===
Upon assuming office, Tusk dismissed the top executives from Telewizja Polska, the nominally independent public service broadcaster, at that point considered "a propaganda machine for the PiS government”, promising to "turn Polish state media into a source of reliable information”. The dismissals resulted a sit-in protest of PiS supporters at the premises of the national broadcaster, as well as a spat between Tusk and President Duda. Stanley Bill, who serves as a professor of Polish Studies at the University of Cambridge, stated that Tusk might have been driven by an additional personal motive, as the state-controlled broadcaster's narrative had been continuously demonizing him during PiS rule.

In February 2024, responding to protests by European farmers, Tusk said he would push for changes to the European Green Deal. In March 2024, he insisted that Poland would go its own way "without European coercion". In January 2025, he blamed the European Green Deal for high energy prices in the EU.

He is promoting the development of civil nuclear power in Poland and has signed civil nuclear cooperation agreements with Japan, Canada, Czech Republic, Sweden and France. He announced the updated partnership between Poland's state-owned company Polskie Elektrownie Jądrowe (PEJ) and a consortium led by American firms Westinghouse and Bechtel for advancing the three-unit AP1000 project in Choczewo, Pomeranian Voivodeship. He invited private financial investor for the construction of a second power plant.

Tusk's administration oversaw the arrests of MPs Mariusz Kamiński and Maciej Wąsik, both tried for exceeding authority since 2015. President Duda had issued pardons to both of the accused, who continued to serve as ministers and members of Sejm as their trials proceeded. The pardons became embroiled in a legal battle due to the pardoning taking place before the final verdict, with the Supreme Court of Poland ultimately ruling them invalid due to occurring before sentencing. Both MPs stayed in the Presidential Palace in an attempt to have Duda shield them, however police arrested the convicts upon entering presidential premises, highlighting tensions between prime minister and president.

In April 2024, Tusk opposed the EU Migration Pact, stating "we will protect Poland from the relocation mechanism".

In October 2024, Tusk announced plans to temporarily suspend the right of migrants to seek asylum in Poland, citing abuses in the context of hybrid warfare activity carried out by Belarus and Russia, resulting in the EU border crisis. The plan, included in the government's new migration strategy, was initially considered controversial but ultimately met with approval from other EU leaders.

In January 2025, Tusk supported proposals to reduce benefits paid by Poland to Ukrainian refugees, limiting eligibility to those actually living in the country.

In February 2025, Tusk unveiled plans for economic deregulation to spur growth, appointing InPost CEO Rafał Brzoska to lead the advisory team, although Brzoska later abandoned the project. In May of the same year, Tusk announced plans to introduce 100 new laws that would have helped deregulate the Polish economy, but those plans were later scrapped.

In March 2026, Tusk announced that Poland, along with a group of EU member states, sent a letter to European Commission leadership demanding the continuation of free carbon allowances for industry beyond 2034. Speaking in Gdańsk, Tusk called for a restructuring of the EU Emissions Trading System (ETS) to mitigate high electricity prices, arguing that the phase-out of free permits from 2028 should be smoothed to prevent an excessive burden on industry.

=== Foreign policy ===
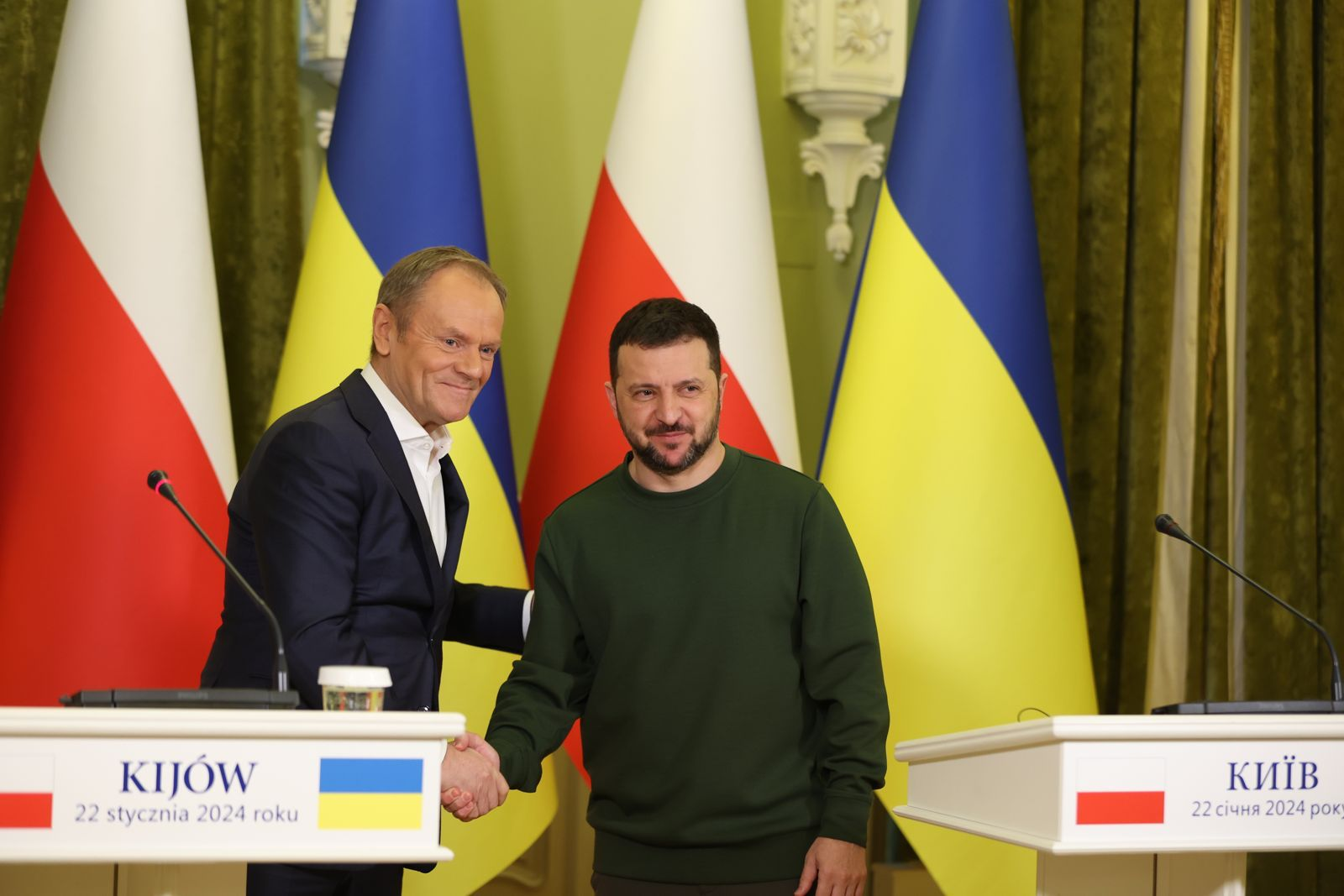
Meeting with President Volodymyr Zelenskyy in Kyiv, 2024

On 22 January 2024, Tusk arrived in Kyiv, Ukraine on a working visit and met with Ukrainian president Volodymyr Zelenskyy. He stated that all those who chose neutrality in the Russo-Ukrainian War and did not support Ukraine deserved "the darkest place in political hell", calling for the "full mobilization" of the West. Tusk has supported efforts to strengthen European strength in the face of Russia, proclaiming "there is no reason for the EU to be weaker than Russia" after a string of comments made by then-US presidential candidate Donald Trump saying that he would let Russia do "whatever the hell they want" to NATO countries who do not satisfy spending commitments.

In May 2024, Tusk criticized the International Criminal Court's arrest warrants for Israeli prime minister Benjamin Netanyahu alongside Hamas leaders, saying, "an attempt to show that the prime minister of Israel and the leaders of terrorist organizations are the same, and the involvement of international institutions in this, is unacceptable."

In August 2024, Tusk stated that Ukraine's membership in the European Union would not be possible without resolving the question of Polish victims of the Volhynian Genocide and their proper remembrance, echoing the words of Defense Minister Władysław Kosiniak-Kamysz spoken a few days before at a press conference. The prime minister's statement came as a reaction to the then-Ukrainian foreign minister Dmytro Kuleba who suggested that this issue should be left to historians.

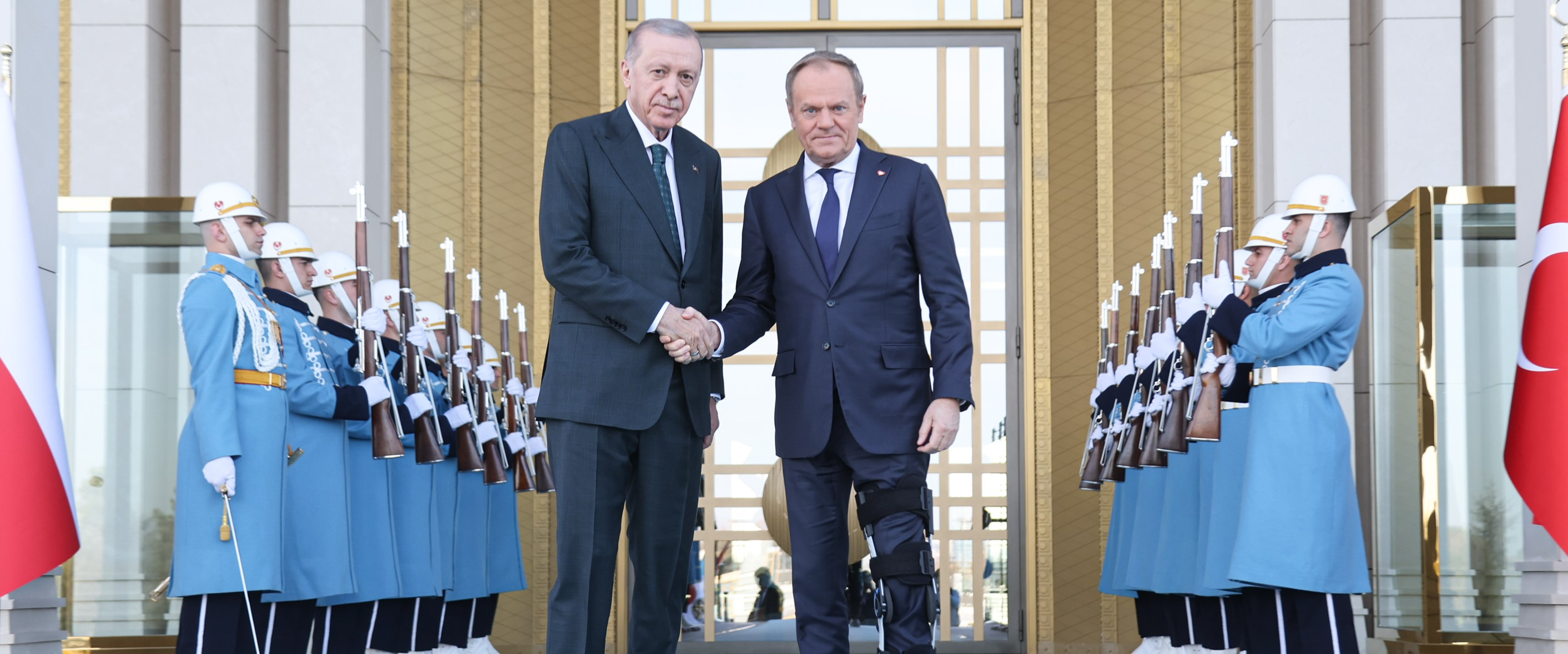
Tusk with Turkish President Recep Tayyip Erdoğan in Ankara, 12 March 2025

In January 2025, Tusk guaranteed safe passage for senior Israeli officials to travel to an event marking the 80th anniversary of the liberation of Auschwitz concentration camp by Soviet troops, despite an arrest warrant issued for Israeli prime minister Benjamin Netanyahu by the International Criminal Court.

In February 2025, Poland was Europe's leading defence spender, allocating 4.7% of its GDP to military expenditure and significantly exceeding NATO's target threshold. Tusk emphasised maintaining strong U.S.-European relations while advocating for increased European defence capabilities. He ruled out sending Polish troops to Ukraine as part of a post-ceasefire peacekeeping force, diverting from French president Emmanuel Macron's idea.

In March 2025, Tusk emphasized the need for a united and well-armed Europe, proposing the creation of a European "Defense Bank" to finance military investments. He highlighted the paradox of "500 million Europeans asking 300 million Americans to defend them from 140 million Russians".

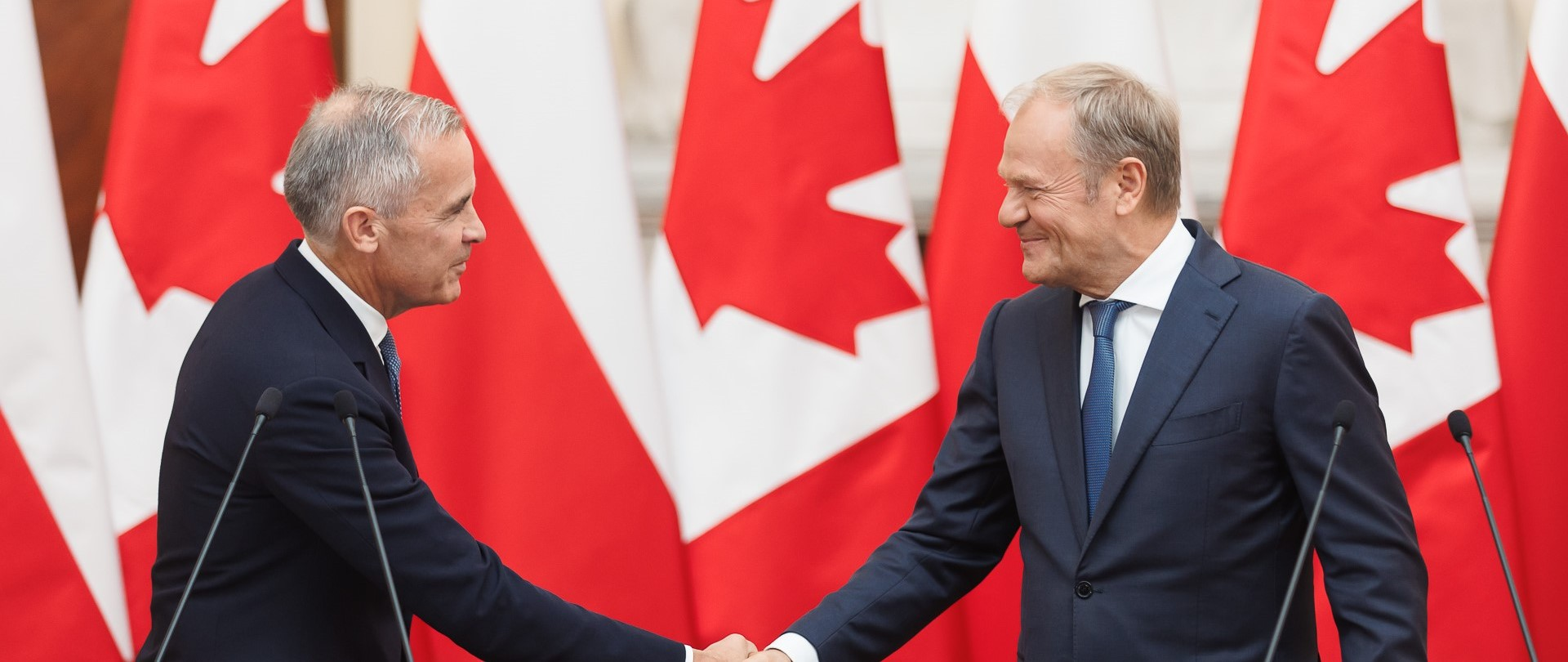
Tusk with Canadian Prime Minister Mark Carney in Warsaw, 25 August 2025

On 3 August 2025, Tusk criticized the Israeli blockade of the Gaza Strip for causing a famine. He posted on X that while Poland "will be on Israel’s side in its confrontation with Islamic terrorism", it will "never be on the side of politicians whose actions lead to hunger and the death of mothers and children." Tusk explicitly referenced the "hell of World War II," suggesting that the lessons of that history should make the gravity of such suffering obvious to both nations. The Israeli Foreign Ministry condemned his remarks as "unacceptable" and accused him of distorting history, stating that his allusion to the Holocaust "denigrates the memory of the victims."

After the souring of Poland's diplomatic relations with Hungary due to the premiership and policies of Viktor Orbán, Tusk has pledged to work with the newly incumbent prime minister of Hungary Péter Magyar to mend relations, with Magyar scheduled to make his first international trip to Poland to meet Tusk.

=== Controversy surrounding 2025 presidential election ===
During Tusk's term, the 2025 presidential election took place, where concerns were raised about the actions of some members of certain local electoral commissions. Based on these concerns, along with other members of the ruling coalition, he partook in election denial about the presidential election.

== Personal life ==
Donald Tusk married Małgorzata Sochacka in 1978 in Gdańsk, while both were students. The couple has two children, a son Michał (born 1982) and a daughter Katarzyna (born 1987), as well as five grandchildren. They primarily live in Sopot.

His son Michał worked as a spokesman and consultant for the OLT Express airline owned by a shadow bank Amber Gold, which was later revealed to be a Ponzi scheme operating during Tusk's first tenure as prime minister. In 2017 Michał Tusk testified before a parliamentary investigative commission regarding the matter.

Tusk belongs to the Kashubian minority in Poland. In an interview with the Israeli newspaper Haaretz in December 2008, he compared his own family history to the Jewish experience, describing the Kashubian minority as a people who, "like the Jews, are people who were born and live in border areas and were suspected by the Nazis and by the Communists of being disloyal".

Tusk speaks Polish, Kashubian, German, and English. In 2014, at the time he was appointed President of the European Council, he was criticized for his poor English and lack of knowledge of French. However, he underwent intensive language training in advance of assuming the role, rapidly mastering English. In January 2019, Tusk gave a seven-minute speech only in Romanian at the Romanian Athenaeum in Bucharest at the ceremony that marked the beginning of Romania's EU Council Presidency, receiving loud applause.

Tusk's religious views became a subject of debate during his 2005 presidential campaign. To avoid further speculation, shortly before the election he requested a Catholic marriage ceremony with his wife Małgorzata, whom he had married in a civil ceremony 27 years prior.

On 12 December 2019, Tusk published his memoir Szczerze (Honestly), reflecting on his memories from the five-year tenure as President of the European Council.

== Honours and awards ==
The Charlemagne Prize of the city of Aachen was awarded to Tusk on 13 May 2010 for his merits in the further unification of Europe and for his role as a "patriot and great European". He dedicated the prize to the people killed in a plane crash of a Polish Air Force Tu-154 in April 2010 including the Polish president Lech Kaczyński. The eulogy was given by German chancellor Angela Merkel.

In May 2012, he received the Walther-Rathenau-Preis "in recognition for his commitment to European integration during Poland's Presidency of the Council of the EU in the second half of 2011 and for fostering Polish–German dialogue". In her speech German chancellor Merkel praised Tusk as "a farsighted European". In the same year, he also received the European Prize for Political Culture. In December 2017, he was awarded an honorary doctorate at the University of Pécs, Hungary, in recognition of Tusk's "achievements as a Polish and European politician, which are strongly connected with Hungarian, regional and European history". On 16 December 2018, Tusk was awarded an honorary doctorate at the TU Dortmund University, Germany, "in recognition of his services to European politics and his contribution to the debate on European values". In 2019, he was awarded an honorary doctorate at the University of Lviv, Ukraine, which he accepted on the fifth anniversary of the Revolution of Dignity.

- Grand Cross Order of the Sun (2008, Peru)
- Grand Cross of the Royal Norwegian Order of Merit (2012, Norway)
- Presidential Order of Excellence (2013, Georgia)
- Order of the Cross of Terra Mariana (2014, Estonia)
- The First Class of the Order of Prince Yaroslav the Wise (2019, Ukraine)
- Grand Cordon of the Order of the Rising Sun (2021, Japan)

== See also ==
- First Cabinet of Donald Tusk
- Second Cabinet of Donald Tusk
- Third Cabinet of Donald Tusk
- History of Poland (1989–present)
- List of political parties in Poland
- List of politicians in Poland
- Politics of Poland
- List of Poles
- 2005 Polish presidential election
- 2005 Polish parliamentary election
- 2007 Polish parliamentary election
- 2011 Polish parliamentary election
- 2023 Polish parliamentary election
- List of current heads of state and government
- List of heads of the executive by approval rating

Political offices
Preceded by Jarosław Kaczyński	Prime Minister of Poland; 2007–2014	Succeeded by Ewa Kopacz
Preceded by Herman Van Rompuy	President of the European Council; 2014–2019	Succeeded by Charles Michel
Preceded by Mateusz Morawiecki	Prime Minister of Poland; 2023–present	Incumbent
Party political offices
Preceded by Maciej Płażyński	Leader of the Civic Platform; 2003–2014	Succeeded by Ewa Kopacz
Preceded by Joseph Daul	President of the European People's Party; 2019–2022	Succeeded by Manfred Weber
Preceded by Borys Budka	Leader of the Civic Platform; 2021–present	Incumbent
Academic offices
Preceded by Antonio Tajani	Invocation Speaker of the College of Europe; 2019	Succeeded by Marcelo Rebelo de Sousa
Order of precedence
Preceded by Małgorzata Kidawa-Błońska as Marshal of the Senate	Order of precedence of Poland; Prime Minister	Succeeded by Władysław Kosiniak-Kamysz as Deputy Prime Minister
