= Albin Siekierski =

20th century Polish author

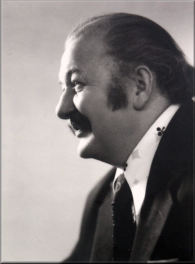
- Born: 1 March 1920; Imielin, Province of Upper Silesia, Weimar Republic
- Died: 28 February 1989 (aged 68); Katowice, Poland
- Citizenship: Polish
- Occupations: writer, politician, scenarist

Albin Franciszek Siekierski (1 March 1920 – 28 February 1989) was a Polish writer.

== Biography ==
Siekierski was born on 1 March 1920 in Imielin, Weimar Republic. He was born into a family of railwaymen. Siekierski completed the classic grammar school in Mysłowice in 1938. Although never signed “deutsche Volksliste” (German People's List), he was called up into Wehrmacht, sent to the eastern front and wounded there in the battle of Kursk.

After recovery, he deserted from German army. Thanks to the support of friends he got new identity papers issued as Bonifacy Czyżewski. He was nonetheless picked up in a raid in Kraków and was deported to a Nazi helping camp in Saxony. He had to work in a china factory. After returning home he studied at college for human sciences and economics in Katowice.

== Literary legislating ==
Albin Siekierski made his poetic debut 1936. He printed two stories in the following press after the war: Gośc Niedzielny (Sunday's Guest; weekly magazine edit in Katowice) and Ogniw (chainlink) an organ of Armia Krajowa (AK) (The Home Army, literally translated as the Country's Army; code name "Polski Związek Powstańczy" (PZP) – Polish Insurgent Union). In the fifties he was member of editorial staff of Poglądy (Opinions) On 1958 he got out the stage play Domek z ogródkiem (House with an Allotment garden), that is meant for amateur theatre. 1959 following plays were published: "Na granicy Górnego Śląska" (at the frontier of upper silesia) and "Umowa stoi" (the agreement is fixed), further in 1960 the one-act play "Szarwark" (corvée).

The novel "Ocalenie" (rescue) came out in 1960 as well, which could be considered as the real debut of Albin Siekierski. His other works of literature are: "Urodzajne piachy" (fertile sands), "Pół godziny przyjaźni" (half an our friendship), by which the movie "Czerwone berety" (red berets) is made, "Odchodzące niepokoje" (vanishing unrests), "Ku górze nad rzeką" (to the mountain at the river), "Ziemia nie boi się kul" (earth does fear bullets not), "Chłodny wiatr odpędza ptaki" (cold wind frights birds away) (Stories 1972), "Czarne i białe pióropusze" (black and white plumes), "Dziewczyna ze strzelnicy" (girl from the shooting range), "Nie odpoczywa w spokoju" (rest not in peace), "Drzewo liści nie dobiera" (a tree does not choose its leaves), "Nie dojrzeje owoc" (the fruit does ripe not), "Nic się nie stało" (nothing has happened), "Druga strona księżyca" (the other side of the moon), script for the movie Ślad na ziemi (a trace on earth) (1977–1978). The plot of the novel Ziemia nie boi się kul takes place in Imielin in times of the Silesian Uprisings (1919–1921).

Kazimierz Kutz based the scenario for "Paciorki jednego różańca" (beads of one rosary) on one of Albin Siekierski's stories of the subject area "this house is no more" . Albin Siekierski's other screenplays are "Symulanci" (malingerers), "Nie wstydź się własnej żony" (do not be ashamed of your own wife), "Sprawa osobista" (personal matter), "Wina bez kary" (fault without punishment), "Fermentacja" (fermentation). Withal he wrote the scenario for the television series Blisko, coraz bliżej (close, increasingly closer; an allusion to the independence of Poland).

Over thirty years Albin Siekierski wrote dozens of novels, stories, stage plays and feuilletons.

Between 1985 and 1989 he was a member of parliament (Sejm) of People's Republic of Poland.

On 28 February 1989, Albin Siekierski died, in his habitation Katowice Ligota. In 2004, there was founded a collective and cultural society of his name in his birth town.

== Filmography ==
- 1963: "Czerwone berety" (red berets) – screenplay
- 1977: "Okrągły tydzień" (round week) – writer
- 1980: "Paciorki jednego rózanca" (the beads of one rosary) – writer – based on the story "Tego domu juz nie ma" (this house is no more)
- 1983: "Blisko, coraz blizej" (close, increasingly closer) – writer
- 1990: "Rodzina Kanderów" (the Kander family) – writer
